= List of Canadian films of 2021 =

This is a list of Canadian films released in 2021:

Title	Director	Cast	Notes	Ref
The 108 Journey	Hugo Rozon, Mathieu Perrault Lapierre			
Affairs of the Art	Joanna Quinn			
Altar Boy	Serville Poblete	Mark Bacolcol, Shai Barcia		
Artificial Immortality	Ann Shin			
Ain't No Time for Women (Y'a pas d'heure pour les femmes)	Sarra El Abed			
Ajjigiingiluktaaqtaugut (We Are All Different)	Lindsay McIntyre			
Albedo	Stephen A. Smith			
Aline	Valérie Lemercier	Valérie Lemercier, Roc Lafortune, Danielle Fichaud, Sylvain Marcel		
All My Puny Sorrows	Michael McGowan	Alison Pill, Sarah Gadon, Amybeth McNulty	Adaptation of the novel by Miriam Toews	
Alone (Seuls)	Paul Tom			
Altar Boy	Serville Poblete	Mark Bacolcol, Shai Barcia, Pablo Quiogue, Emily Beattie, Denzel Brooks, Blake Canning		
Angakusajaujuq: The Shaman's Apprentice	Zacharias Kunuk	Madeline Ivalu, Jacky Qrunnut, Lucy Tulugarjuk		
Anne Murray: Full Circle	Morgan Elliott, Adrian Buitenhuis	Anne Murray		
Archipelago (Archipel)	Félix Dufour-Laperrière			
Babushka	Kristina Wagenbauer			
Bad Seeds (Mauvaises herbes)	Claude Cloutier			
Be Still	Elizabeth Lazebnik	Piercey Dalton		
Beneath the Surface (Le Lac des hommes)	Marie-Geneviève Chabot			
The Benevolents (Les Bienveillants)	Sarah Baril Gaudet			
Best Sellers	Lina Roessler	Michael Caine, Aubrey Plaza, Scott Speedman		
Between Them (Toutes les deux)	Noël Mitrani	Veronika Leclerc Strickland, Mélanie Elliott, Vitali Makarov		
Between Us	Cailleah Scott-Grimes			
Big Giant Wave (Comme une vague)	Marie-Julie Dallaire			
Big Things	Eric Peterson			
The Blactor	Rukiya Bernard			
The Boathouse	Hannah Cheesman	Michaela Kurimsky, Alan Van Sprang, Taylor Belle, Jack Fulton		
Boobs (Lolos)	Marie Valade			
Bootlegger	Caroline Monnet	Devery Jacobs, Pascale Bussières, Samian, Jacques Newashish, Dominique Pétin		
Brain Freeze	Julien Knafo	Roy Dupuis		
Brothers (Bhai)	Hamza Bangash			
Canucks Riot I	Lewis Bennett			
Captive	Mellissa Fung			
Carmen	Valerie Buhagiar	Natascha McElhone, Steven Love, Richard Clarkin		
Catching a Serial Killer: Bruce McArthur	James Buddy Day			
Chocolate	Charlene Moore			
Cinema of Sleep	Jeffrey St. Jules	Dayo Ade, Getenesh Berhe, Jonas Chernick, Oluniké Adeliyi		
Coextinction	Gloria Pancrazi, Elena Jean			
Confessions of a Hitman (Confessions)	Luc Picard	Luc Picard, David La Haye, Sandrine Bisson		
La Contemplation du mystère	Albéric Aurtenèche	Emmanuel Schwartz, Sarah-Jeanne Labrosse, Gilles Renaud, François Papineau, Martin Dubreuil		
Damascus Dreams	Émilie Serri			
Darkroom	Lukas Maier			
Dawn, Her Dad and the Tractor	Shelley Thompson	Maya Henry, Robb Wells, Amy Groening		
Dead Man's Switch: A Crypto Mystery	Sheona McDonald			
Dear Audrey	Jeremiah Hayes	Martin Duckworth, Audrey Schirmer		
Dear Jackie	Henri Pardo			
Defund	Khadijah Roberts-Abdullah, Araya Mengesha	Khadijah Roberts-Abdullah, Araya Mengesha		
Dehors Serge dehors	Martin Fournier, Pier-Luc Latulippe	Serge Thériault		
The Desperate Hour	Phillip Noyce	Naomi Watts		
The Displeasure (La Grogne)	Alisi Telengut			
Donkeyhead	Agam Darshi	Agam Darshi, Stephen Lobo, Sandy Sidhu, Husein Madhavji, Kim Coates		
Drifting Snow	Ryan Noth	Sonja Smits, Jonas Bonnetta, Colin Mochrie, Linda Goranson		
Drinkwater	Stephen Campanelli	Eric McCormack, Daniel Doheny		
Drunken Birds (Les oiseaux ivres)	Ivan Grbovic	Jorge Antonio Guerrero, Marine Johnson		
Dust Bath	Seth A. Smith			
Evan's Drum	Ossie Michelin			
Evelyne	Carl Bessai	Rumbie Muzofa		
The Exchange	Dan Mazer	Ed Oxenbould, Avan Jogia, Justin Hartley		
The Face of Anonymous	Gary Lang	Christopher Doyon		
Fanmi	Sandrine Brodeur-Desrosiers, Carmine Pierre-Dufour	Mireille Métellus, Marie-Evelyne Lessard		
Fanny: The Right to Rock	Bobbi Jo Hart	Fanny		
Far Beyond the Pasturelands (Au-delà des hautes vallées)	Maude Plante-Husaruk, Maxime Lacoste-Lebuis			
A Father's Diary	Golam Mustofa	Afroz Khan, Nidhi Dhara, Brittany Clough, Deepa Khandakar, Christy Eveleigh		
Felix and the Treasure of Morgäa (Félix et le trésor de Morgäa)	Nicola Lemay	Karine Vanasse, Guy Nadon, Marc Labrèche		
Flower Boy	Anya Chirkova			
Flowing Home (Như một dòng sông)	Sandra Desmazières			
Forest for the Trees	Rita Leistner			
Freebird	Michael Joseph McDonald, Joe Bluhm, Nicholas Herd			
Fresh Water	David Kalinauskas	Antonio Lennert		
Gabor	Joannie Lafrenière	Gabor Szilasi		
The Gig Is Up	Shannon Walsh			
The Good Woman of Sichuan	Sabrina Zhao			
Goodbye Happiness (Au revoir le bonheur)	Ken Scott	Francois Arnaud, Antoine Bertrand		
The Guide to the Perfect Family (Le guide de la famille parfaite)	Ricardo Trogi	Louis Morissette, Émilie Bierre, Catherine Chabot		
Handle With Care: The Legend of the Notic Streetball Crew	Jeremy Schaulin-Rioux, Kirk Thomas			
Hands That Bind	Kyle Armstrong	Paul Sparks, Landon Liboiron, Nicholas Campbell, Susan Kent, Bruce Dern		
The Hangman at Home	Michelle Kranot, Uri Kranot			
Hatha	Asia Youngman			
Heavy Petting	Brendan Prost			
Heirdoms (Soumissions)	Emmanuel Tardif	Martin Dubreuil, Charlotte Aubin, Lucette Chalifoux, Félix Grenier, Léa Roy		
Hell or Clean Water	Cody Westman	Shawn Bath		
His Name Is Ray	Michael Del Monte			
Honour to Senator Murray Sinclair	Alanis Obomsawin			
The Horses	Liz Cairns			
How to Fix Radios	Emily Russell, Casper Leonard	James Rudden, Dimitri Watson		
If from Every Tongue It Drips	Sharlene Bamboat			
In the Jam Jar	Colin Nixon	France Castel, Alain Goulem		
In the Rumbling Belly of Motherland	Brishkay Ahmed			
Indigenous Dads	Peter Brass			
Inès	Renée Beaulieu	Rosalie Bonenfant, Roy Dupuis, Noémie Godin-Vigneau, Martin Dubreuil		
The Inhuman (L'Inhumain)	Jason Brennan	Samian, Jeanne Roux-Côté, Véronique Beaudet		
International Dawn Chorus Day	John Greyson			
Islands	Martin Edralin	Rogelio Balagtas, Vangie Alcasid, Esteban Comilang, Sheila Lotuaco		
The Isobel Imprint	Ali Grant			
Jean Swanson: We Need a New Map	Teresa Alfield	Jean Swanson		
Joutel	Alexa-Jeanne Dubé	Pierre Curzi, Marie Tifo		
Kicking Blood	Blaine Thurier	Alanna Bale, Luke Bilyk		
Kímmapiiyipitssini: The Meaning of Empathy	Elle-Máijá Tailfeathers			
Kiri and the Girl	Grace Dove			
Lamya's Poem	Alexander Kronemer	Mena Massoud, Millie Davis		
The Last Tourist	Tyson Sadler			
Learn to Swim	Thyrone Tommy	Thomas Antony Olajide, Emma Ferreira		
Like a House on Fire	Jesse Noah Klein	Sarah Sutherland, Jared Abrahamson, Dominique Provost-Chalkley		
Like the Ones I Used to Know (Les Grandes claques)	Annie St-Pierre	Steve Laplante, Lilou Roy-Lanouette, Larissa Corriveau		
Little Bird	Tim Myles			
Livrés chez vous sans contact	Gaëlle d'Ynglemare	Jean-Marie Corbeil, François Maranda		
Lune	Arturo Pérez Torres, Aviva Armour-Ostroff	Aviva Armour-Ostroff, Chloe Van Landschoot, Vlad Alexis		
Maria	Alec Pronovost	Mariana Mazza		
Maria Chapdelaine	Sébastien Pilote	Sara Montpetit, Émile Schneider, Antoine Olivier Pilon, Robert Naylor, Hélène Florent, Sébastien Ricard		
Mary Two-Axe Earley: I Am Indian Again	Courtney Montour			
Medicine and Magic	Thirza Cuthand			
Memory Box	Joana Hadjithomas, Khalil Joreige	Rim Turki, Manal Issa, Paloma Vauthier	Canadian-Lebanese-French coproduction	
Meneath: The Hidden Island of Ethics	Terril Calder	Lake Delisle, Kent McQuaid, Gail Maurice		
The Middle Man	Bent Hamer	Pål Sverre Hagen, Tuva Novotny, Paul Gross, Don McKellar, Rossif Sutherland	Canadian-Danish-German-Norwegian coproduction	
Militant Mother	Carmen Pollard			
Mimine	Simon Laganière	Stéphane Breton, Laurent Lemaire, Émilie Lévesque		
The Mohel	Charles Wahl			
Motherly	Craig David Wallace	Lora Burke, Tessa Kozma, Kristen MacCulloch, Nick Smyth		
Mouth Congress	Paul Bellini, Scott Thompson	Paul Bellini, Scott Thompson, Kevin McDonald		
My Tree	Jason Sherman			
Nalujuk Night	Jennie Williams			
NBA Films for Fans	Kathleen Jayme, Shawn Gerrard, Romeo Candido, S.M. Turrell, Thyrone Tommy		Anthology of five short documentary films about basketball	
News from Home	Sara Wylie			
Night Blooms	Stephanie Joline	Jessica Clement, Nick Stahl		
Night Raiders	Danis Goulet	Amanda Plummer, Shaun Sipos, Eric Osborne, Elle-Máijá Tailfeathers, Gail Maurice		
No Title (Pas de titre)	Alexandra Myotte	Jean-Sébastien Hamel		
No Trace (Nulle trace)	Simon Lavoie	Monique Gosselin, Nathalie Doummar, Victor Andrés Trelles Turgeon		
The Noise of Engines (Le bruit des moteurs)	Philippe Grégoire	Robert Naylor, Arnmundur Ernst Björnsson, Marc Beaupré		
Nouveau Québec	Sarah Fortin	Christine Beaulieu, Jean-Sébastien Courchesne, Jean-Luc Kanapé		
Nuisance Bear	Jack Weisman, Gabriela Osio Vanden			
On Either Side	Elisa Julia Gilmour			
One of Ours	Yasmine Mathurin			
Operation Luchador	Alain Vézina			
Oscar Peterson: Black and White	Barry Avrich			
Ousmane	Jorge Camarotti			
Pat Rocco Dared	Morris Chapdelaine, Bob Christie	Pat Rocco		
Peace by Chocolate	Jonathan Keijser	Ayham Abou Ammar, Hatem Ali, Yara Sabri		
The Perfect Victim (La parfaite victime)	Monic Néron, Émilie Perreault			
Perfecting the Art of Longing	Kitra Cahana			
Personals	Sasha Argirov			
Portraits from a Fire	Trevor Mack	William Lulua, Nathaniel Arcand, Asivak Koostachin		
Première vague	Max Dufaud, Kevin T. Landry, Reda Lahmouid, Rémi Fréchette			
Prometheus	Marie Farsi			
Quickening	Haya Waseem			
Range Roads	Kyle Thomas	Alana Hawley Purvis, Joe Perry, Kris Demeanor, Chad Brownlee		
Records	Alan Zweig			
The Retreat	Pat Mills	Tommie-Amber Pirie, Sarah Allen		
Returning Home	Sean Stiller	Phyllis Webstad		
A Revision (Une révision)	Catherine Therrien	Patrice Robitaille, Nour Belkhiria		
The Righteous	Mark O'Brien	Henry Czerny, Mimi Kuzyk, Mark O'Brien, Kate Corbett		
Run Woman Run	Zoe Leigh Hopkins	Dakota Ray Hebert, Asivak Koostachin, Lorne Cardinal, Craig Lauzon, Gary Farmer		
A Safe Distance	Gloria Mercer			
Ste. Anne	Rhayne Vermette			
Sam	Yan England	Antoine-Olivier Pilon, Mylène Mackay		
Saturday Night	Rosana Matecki			
Scarborough	Shasha Nakhai, Rich Williamson	Liam Diaz, Essence Fox, Anna Claire Beitel		
The Scattering of Man (DƏNE YI’INJETL)	Luke Gleeson			
The Secret Society	Rebecca Campbell			
See for Me	Randall Okita	Skyler Davenport, Kim Coates		
See You Garbage! (Au plaisir les ordures!)	Romain Dumont	Guillaume Laurin, Hamza Meziani, Hamidou Savadogo, Steve Laplante, Caroline Dhavernas, Ralph Prosper		
A Small Fortune	Adam Perry	Stephen Oates, Liane Balaban, Andrea Bang, Joel Thomas Hynes		
Social Hygiene (Hygiène sociale)	Denis Côté	Maxim Gaudette, Larissa Corriveau, Évelyne Rompré		
Solitary Skies	Amanda Cassidy			
Someone Like Me	Steve J. Adams, Sean Horlor			
Spearphishing	Tim McKort	Alex Gallant, Kennedy Chester, Dwight Dawn		
Spirit to Soar	Tanya Talaga			
Srikandi	Andrea Nirmala Widjajanto			
Still Max	Katherine Knight	Max Dean		
Stray Ducks (Canards errants)	Bruno Chouinard			
Stupid for You	Jude Klassen			
Subjects of Desire	Jennifer Holness			
The Syed Family Xmas Eve Game Night	Fawzia Mirza	Kausar Mohammed, Vico Ortiz		
Tanglewood	Ben Bruhmuller			
Tenzin	Michael LeBlanc, Josh Reichmann	Tenzin Kelsang		
They Dance With Their Heads (Ils dansent avec leurs têtes)	Thomas Corriveau			
Things We Feel But Do Not Say	Lauren Grant			
The Time Thief (L'Arracheuse de temps)	Francis Leclerc	Céline Bonnier, Guillaume Cyr, Pier-Luc Funk, Marc Messier, Émile Proulx-Cloutier		
Tla-o-qui-aht Dugout Canoe	Steven Davies			
Together	Albert Shin	Kim Jae-rok, Ahn So-yo		
Twelve Hours	Paul Shkordoff			
Tzouhalem	Harold Joe, Leslie Bland			
The Untouchable	Avazeh Shahnavaz			
A Void	Dominique Van Olm			
Wars (Guerres)	Nicolas Roy	Éléonore Loiselle, David La Haye, Fanny Mallette		
The White Fortress (Tabija)	Igor Drljaca	Pavle Čemerikić, Sumeja Dardagan		
We Are the Menstruators	Nadia Giosia			
We're All in This Together	Katie Boland	Katie Boland, Martha Burns, Alisha Newton, Adam Butcher		
Wildhood	Bretten Hannam	Phillip Lewitski, Joshua Odjick		
Without You	Mina Shum			
Wochiigii lo: End of the Peace	Heather Hatch			
Woman in Car	Vanya Rose	Hélène Joy, Carl Alacchi, Liane Balaban		
The Zama Zama Project	Rosalind Morris			
Zero	Lee Filipovski			
Zo Reken	Emanuel Licha			

== See also ==
- 2021 in Canada
- 2021 in Canadian television
