= Quebec City Film Festival =

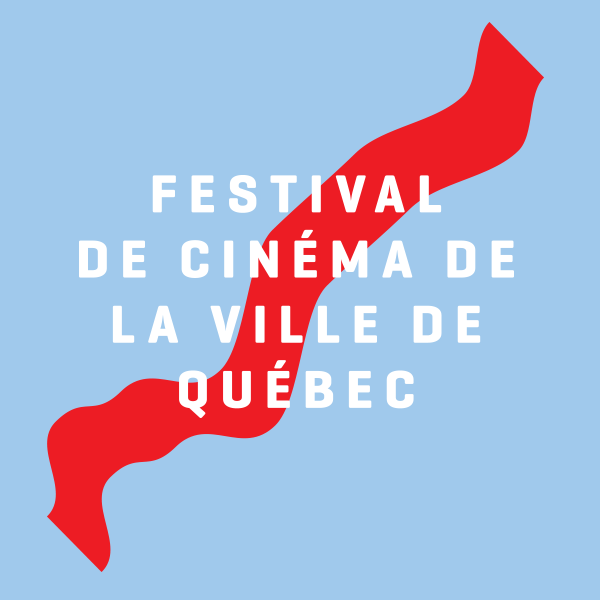
- Location: Quebec City, Quebec, Canada
- Founded: 2011
- Founded by: Olivier Bilodeau, Marie-Christine Laflamme, Christopher Lemonnier
- Website: qcff.ca

Quebec City Film Festival (French: Festival de cinéma de la ville de Québec) (FCVQ or QCFF) is a film festival held annually in September in Quebec City, Quebec, Canada. It screens short and feature films and premieres movies from all over the world.

== Description ==
Founded in 2011, the Quebec City Film Festival (QCFF) is a non-profit organization that strives to offer film enthusiasts from Quebec and visitors from outside the province and abroad a major film event similar to other iconic international film festivals. It is a renowned and recognised platform that screens regional and international productions of new and original films. The QCFF also supports local and regional emerging artists by providing them with a showcase to present their works that attracts major media exposure.

== History ==
Since its inception, every year in the month of September the QCFF presents about 50 international feature films and more than 100 short films. The films represent all cinematographic genres and perspectives from all over the world, attracting an audience of more than 25,000 festival visitors every year. In addition to these works come the artisans that create them. At past events, the QCFF was proud to welcome more than 300 special guests to the festival, including well known filmmakers Jean-Claude Labrecque, Xavier Dolan, Jean-Marc Vallée, Denys Arcand, Christophe Gans, Mike Figgis, and Larry Clark as well as the many actors, writers and producers who also accompany their works at the festival.

The festival was not staged in 2021, due to the COVID-19 pandemic in Quebec, but returned in 2022 with a smaller program than usual.

=== 2011 ===
- 21 September – 2 October
- 122 films
- 80 special guests
- 10 387 festival visitors

For its first edition, the QCFF opened with film Jean-Marc Vallée’s film Café de Flore, which was attended by the film's team; The Happiness of Others (Le bonheur des autres), the feature debut by Jean-Philippe Pearson, closed the festival.

=== 2012 ===
- 13 – 23 September
- 155 films
- 75 special guests
- 24 421 festival visitors

Based on a true story, L'Affaire Dumont was presented as the opening film of the second edition of the QCFF and attended by director Podz, producer Nicole Robert and actors that appeared in the film. Filmmaker Anaïs Barbeau-Lavalette's Inch'Allah was chosen to close the second festival.

Festival activities were centred around the Dôme (aka the Igloo) in Place d’Youville and became a distinctive feature of the festival. It was open free to the public and hosted several evening parties and VIP events.

=== 2013 ===
- 18 – 29 September
- 161 films
- 88 special guests
- 25 464 festival visitors

For its third edition, Parkland by Peter Landesman, an ensemble film based around the assassination of JFK, was presented to open the festival. The Quebec premiere of Stefan Miljevic’s film Amsterdam was chosen to close the festival.

New for the third year: the creation of the Cinephile Jury, made up entirely of residents of Québec City. The jury awards the most original film among first-time filmmakers. In 2013, the award went to Don Jon, the debut by American actor Joseph Gordon-Levitt.

=== 2014 ===
- 18 – 28 September
- 161 films
- 105 special guests
- 23 191 festival visitors

Mommy by Xavier Dolan was presented as the opening film and attended by the film's team. The North American premiere of Beauty and the Beast was screened at the awards ceremony and attended by the film's writer and director Christophe Gans.

The usual closing ceremony, which had been held on the last Saturday, is from then on replaced by a gala on the second Wednesday, during which the award ceremony takes place.

Shortly before the festival began, containers were remodelled as mini cinema halls named Ciné Pop-up. A roaming project, they are placed in different locations throughout Québec City. The goal of Ciné Pop-up is to relocate screenings to where residents live so that they can view a selection of short films in their neighbourhoods.

=== 2015 ===
- 16 – 27 September
- 217 films
- 208 special guests
- 24 839 festival visitors

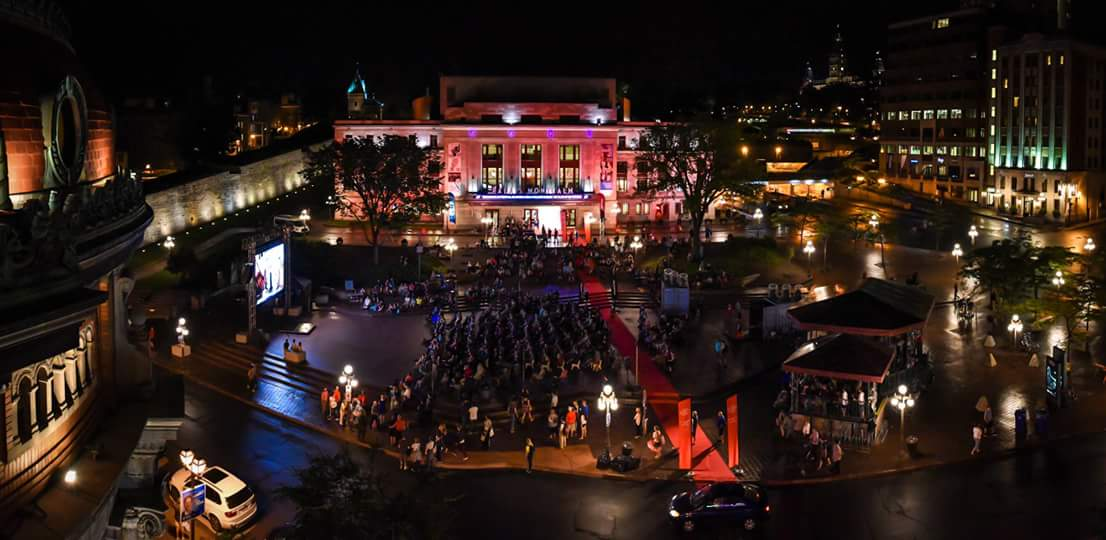
Place d'Youville during QCFF's 5th edition.

Paul à Québec by François Bouvier was presented as the opening film: author Michel Rabagliati, producer Karine Vanasse and actors from the film descended on the red carpet of Place d’Youville for the occasion. Philippe Falardeau's film My Internship in Canada was screened at the awards ceremony.

The concert film The Phantom of the Opera (a screening of the Rupert Julian classic from 1925 set to music by an orchestra conducted by Gabriel Thibaudeau) was presented at the Palais Montcalm and featured a Casavant organ.

Ciné Pop-up continued to relocate throughout the city as Place d'Youville was transformed into a large open-air cinema, with screenings that included, among others, the Back to the Future trilogy to coincide with the 30th anniversary of the release of the first film.

=== 2016 ===
- 14 – 24 September
- 204 special guests
- 294 films
- over 30 000 festival visitors

For its sixth edition, the festival opened with Boundaries (French title: Pays) by Chloé Robichaud, with some members of the film's crew attending. Along with the director, actors such as Rémy Girard, Yves Jacques, Macha Grenon, and Emily Van Camp, as well as Quebec cinema artists like Julien Poulin, Marie Eykel, Manon Briand and Rock Demers walked up the red carpet of place D’Youville.

The Palais Montcalm also hosted the North-American premiere of 1:54 by Yan England, screened as the film of the Award ceremony night. The features It's only the End of the World (French title: Juste la fin du monde) by Xavier Dolan and Kiss me like a Lover (French title: Embrasse-moi comme tu m’aimes) by André Forcier, both premiered at the festival and were favorites among the audience, the latter winning the Public's Choice Award for a Feature Film.

For a third year in a row, the Ciné Pop-up also spread around downtown, both before and during the festival, becoming over the years a classic and must-see event.

=== 2017 ===
- 13 – 23 September
- 253 special guests
- 291 films
- over 45 000 festival visitors

For its 2017 edition, the Festival opened with the world premiere of Cross My Heart, directed by Luc Picard. The filmmaker and members of the casr were in attendance. Barefoot At Dawn by Francis Leclerc screened as the Gala Night Film, and was preceded by the awards ceremony : cast members Roy Dupuis, Justin Leyrolles-Bouchard, Robert Lepage and Marianne Fortier were attending.

Two Film Concerts were hosted at Palais Montcalm. The Passion of Joan of Arc, Dreyer's silent masterpiece of 1928, eas interpreted by the pianist and organist Karol Mossakowski. QCFF also screened Oscar-winning BiRDMAN by Alejandro González Iñárritu, with the soundtrack performed live by its composer, drummer Antonio Sánchez.

Various cultural personalities attended the Festival: Louise Lecavalier, Marc Séguin, Zachary Richard, Cédric Klapisch, and others.

== Tributes ==
- 2011: Jean-Claude Labrècque and Larry Clark
- 2012: Alex Gibney
- 2013: Izabel Grondin and Im Sang-soo
- 2014: Richard Lavoie, Bruce LaBruce and Alain Resnais
- 2015: Denys Arcand and Matthew Rankin
- 2016: Julien Poulin and Rock Demers
- 2017: George Lazenby

== Spokespersons ==
- 2014 : Yves Jacques
- 2015 : François Létourneau

== Venues ==
Mostly displayed in the historical centre of Québec City, QCFF made screenings in the following places :

== Awards ==
=== Grand Prize ===
Year	Film	Director	Ref
2012	White Elephant (Elefante Blanco)	Pablo Trapero	
2013	The Broken Circle Breakdown	Félix Van Groeningen	
2014	20,000 Days on Earth	Iain Forsyth and Jane Pollard	
2015	Necktie Youth	Sibs Shongwe-La Mer	
2016	Peter and the Farm	Tony Stone	
2016	Honorable mention: As I Open My Eyes (À peine j'ouvre les yeux)	Leyla Bouzid	
2017	Sambá	Laura Amelia Guzmán and Israel Cárdenas	
2017	Honorable mention: Lucky	John Carroll Lynch	
2018	A Colony (Une colonie)	Geneviève Dulude-De Celles	
2019	Kuessipan	Myriam Verreault	
2020	Goddess of the Fireflies (La déesse des mouches à feu)	Anaïs Barbeau-Lavalette	
2024	The Last Meal (Le Dernier repas)	Maryse Legagneur	

=== Public Award, Feature Film ===
Year	Film	Director	Ref
2011	The Artist	Michel Hazanavicius	
2012	All Together (Et si on vivait tous ensemble?)	Stéphane Robelin	
2013	The Broken Circle Breakdown	Félix Van Groeningen	
2014	Girls on the Hunt (Un film de chasse et de filles)	Julie Lambert	
2015	Family Demolition (La démolition familiale)	Patrick Damien	
2016	Kiss Me Like a Lover (Embrasse-moi comme tu m'aimes)	André Forcier	
2017	Cross My Heart (Les rois mongols)	Luc Picard	
2018	Pauline Julien, Intimate and Political (Pauline Julien : intime et politique)	Pascale Ferland	
2019	Living 100 MPH (Vivre à 100 milles à l'heure)	Louis Bélanger	
2020	Wandering: A Rohingya Story (Errance sans retour)	Mélanie Carrier, Olivier Higgins	

=== Public Award, Canadian Film ===
Year	Film	Director	Ref
2012	El Huaso	Carlo Guillermo Proto	
2013	Absences	Carole Laganière	
2013	The Effect (L'Effet)	Jocelyn Langlois	
2014	La vie selon Morgue	Jean Fontaine	
2015	Paul à Québec	François Bouvier	
2016	The Gardener	Sébastien Chabot	
2017	Baggage (Bagages)	Paul Tom	
2018	A Colony (Une colonie)	Geneviève Dulude-De Celles	

=== Best First Film (Prix Jury Cinéphile/AQCC Award) ===
Year	Film	Director	Ref
2013	Don Jon	Joseph Gordon-Levitt	
2014	Girls on the Hunt (Un film de chasse et de filles)	Julie Lambert	
2015	Family Demolition (La démolition familiale)	Patrick Damien	
2016	As I Open My Eyes (À peine j'ouvre les yeux)	Leyla Bouzid	
2016	Honorable mention: Old Stone	Johnny Ma	
2016	Honorable mention: Sutak	Mirlan Abdykalykov	
2017	The Nobodies (Los Nadie)	Juan Sebastián Mesa	
2017	Honorable mention: Susan Bartsch: On Top	Anthony Caronna, Alexander Smith	
2018	Smuggling Hendrix	Marios Piperides	
2019	Mad Dog and the Butcher (Les Derniers vilains)	Thomas Rinfret	
2020	Nafi's Father (Baamum Nafi)	Mamadou Dia	

=== Collegiate Jury Award ===
Year	Film	Director	Ref
2015	Necktie Youth	Sibs Shongwe-La Mer	
2016	Manor (Manoir)	Martin Fournier, Pier-Luc Latulippe	
2016	Honorable mention: Tempëte	Samuel Collardey	
2017	Swagger	Olivier Babinet	
2018	Five Fingers for Marseilles	Michael Matthews	
2019	Why Don’t You Just Die!	Kirill Sokolov	
2019	Honorable mention: For Sama	Waad Al-Kateab, Edward Watts	
2020	Call Me Human (Je m'appelle humain)	Kim O'Bomsawin	
2020	Sweet Thing	Alexandre Rockwell	

=== Grand Jury Prize, Canadian Short Film ===
Year	Film	Director	Ref
2014	Pas la grosse Sophie	Philippe Arsenault	
2015	Moulures	Guillaume Monette	
2016	The Voice (La voce)	David Uloth	
2017	Dolls Don't Cry (Toutes les poupées ne pleurent pas)	Frédérick Tremblay	
2018	Fauve	Jérémy Comte	
2019	Heart Bomb (Une bombe au cœur)	Rémi St-Michel	
2020	No award presented		

=== Grand Jury Prize, International Short Film ===
Year	Film	Director	Ref
2016	Zvir	Miroslav Sikavica	
2016	Spoetnik	Noël Loozen	
2017	Scris / Nescreis	Andrian Silisteanu	
2018	Proch	Jakub Radej	
2019	The Summer and All the Rest	Sven Bresser	
2020	Olla	Ariane Labed	

=== Public Prize, Short Film ===
Year	Film	Director	Ref
2011	Mokhtar	Halima Ouardiri	
2012	First Snow (Première neige)	Michaël Lalancette	
2013	Le Chevreuil	Rémi St-Michel	
2014	Jamais je ne t'oublierai	Alexandre Desjardins	
2015	La divine stratégie	Eliot Laprise, Martin Forger	
2016	La Partie	Alexandre Isabelle	
2017	Crème de menthe	Jean-Marc E. Roy, Philippe David Gagné	
2018	Fauve	Jérémy Comte	
2019	I'll End Up in Jail (Je finirai en prison)	Alexandre Dostie	
2020	Toomas Beneath the Valley of the Wild Wolves	Chintis Lundgren	

=== Local Talent Award (Bourse à la création des cinéastes de Québec) ===
Year	Film	Director	Ref
2013	Le Camarade	Benjamin Tessier	
2014	Le frein	Gabriel-Antoine Roy, Jonathan Roy	
2015	La bagatelle	Franie-Eléonore Bernier, Anne-Marie Bouchard, Julie Pelletier	
2016	La Partie	Alexandre Isabelle	
2017	Ballet Jazz	Maxime Robin	
2018	Bonfires	Martin Bureau	
2018	Je la chante dans ma douche, habituellement	Mariane Béliveau	
2019	Canicule	Fanny Perreault	
2020	Vie de rêve	Vincent Paquette	
2020	Sous pression	David Labrecque	
