= 2021 Cinéfest Sudbury International Film Festival =

- Opening film: All My Puny Sorrows by Michael McGowan
- Location: Sudbury, Ontario, Canada
- Founded: 1989
- Festival date: September 18–26, 2021
- Website: cinefest.com

Cinéfest Sudbury International Film Festival
- 2022 2020

The 2021 edition of the Cinéfest Sudbury International Film Festival, the 33rd edition in the event's history, was held from September 18 to 26, 2021 in Sudbury, Ontario, Canada.

The 2021 festival was presented under a hybrid model due to the COVID-19 pandemic with both in-person and online screenings. The festival also introduced a number of juried film awards, following several years of only presenting audience choice-based awards; the new awards program includes cash prizes for Outstanding Canadian Feature, Outstanding International Feature, Outstanding Female-Led Feature, Cinema Indigenized Outstanding Talent, French-Language Feature, Inspiring Voices and Perspectives Feature, Outstanding Short, Outstanding Emerging Canadian Short, and Outstanding Animated Short.

== Awards ==
| Award | Film | Filmmaker |
|---|---|---|
| Audience Choice, Feature Film | The Vinland Club (Le Club Vinland) | Benoît Pilon |
| Audience Choice, Feature Film Runner Up | Mass | Fran Kranz |
| Audience Choice, Documentary | Hell or Clean Water | Cody Westman |
| Audience Choice, Documentary Runner Up | Julia | Julie Cohen, Betsy West |
| Audience Choice, Short Film | The Robbery | Nika Belianina |
| Audience Choice, Short Film Runner Up | Jeep Boys | Alec Pronovost |
| Outstanding Canadian Feature | All My Puny Sorrows | Michael McGowan |
| Outstanding International Feature | Official Competition (Competencia oficial) | Gastón Duprat & Mariano Cohn |
| Outstanding Female-Led Feature Film | Mothering Sunday | Eva Husson |
| Cinema Indigenized Outstanding Talent | Wildhood | Bretten Hannam |
| French-Language Feature Film | Underground (Souterrain) | Sophie Dupuis |
| Inspiring Voices and Perspectives | Dear Future Children | Franz Böhm |
| Inspiring Voices and Perspectives | Kímmapiiyipitssini: The Meaning of Empathy | Elle-Máijá Tailfeathers |
| Outstanding Short Film | Pipo and Blind Love (Pipo et l’amour aveugle) | Hugo Le Gourrierec |
| Outstanding Emerging Canadian Short Filmmaker | Talk | Trivelle Simpson |
| Outstanding Animated Short | Itchy the Camel: Rakes | Anders Beer, PH Dallair |

== Official selections ==
=== Gala Presentations ===
| English title | Original title | Director(s) | Production country |
|---|---|---|---|
| All My Puny Sorrows | | Michael McGowan | Canada |
| The Card Counter | | Paul Schrader | United States |
| The Desperate Hour | | Phillip Noyce | Canada, United States |
| The Electrical Life of Louis Wain | | Will Sharpe | United Kingdom |
| Falling for Figaro | | Ben Lewin | Australia, United Kingdom |
| Juniper | | Matthew J. Saville | New Zealand |
| Night Raiders | | Danis Goulet | Canada, New Zealand |
| Official Competition | Competencia oficial | Gastón Duprat & Mariano Cohn | Spain, Argentina |
| One Second | 一秒钟 | Zhang Yimou | China |
| The Vinland Club | Le Club Vinland | Benoît Pilon | Canada |

=== Special Presentations ===
| English title | Original title | Director(s) | Production country |
|---|---|---|---|
| Best Sellers | | Lina Roessler | Canada, United States |
| Charlotte | | Eric Warin, Tahir Rana | Canada, France, Belgium |
| Dear Future Children | | Franz Böhm | Germany, United Kingdom, Austria |
| Delicious | Délicieux | Éric Besnard | Belgium, France |
| Everything Went Fine | Tout s'est bien passé | François Ozon | France |
| Jockey | | Clint Bentley | United States |
| Julia | | Julie Cohen and Betsy West | United States |
| Maria Chapdelaine | | Sébastien Pilote | Canada |
| The Middle Man | | Bent Hamer | Canada, Denmark, Germany, Norway |
| Mothering Sunday | | Eva Husson | United Kingdom |
| Ninjababy | | Yngvild Sve Flikke | Norway |
| Paris, 13th District | Les Olympiades | Jacques Audiard | France |
| The Perfect Victim | La victime parfaite | Monic Néron, Émilie Perreault | Canada |
| Petite Maman | | Céline Sciamma | France |
| Sam | | Yan England | Canada |
| Underground | Souterrain | Sophie Dupuis | Canada |
| The Worst Person in the World | Verdens verste menneske | Joachim Trier | Norway, France, Denmark, Sweden |

=== Features Canada ===
| English title | Original title | Director(s) | Production country |
|---|---|---|---|
| All-in Madonna | | Arnold Lim | Canada |
| The Boathouse | | Hannah Cheesman | Canada |
| Drunken Birds | Les Oiseaux ivres | Ivan Grbovic | Canada, Mexico |
| Heirdoms | Soumissions | Emmanuel Tardif | Canada |
| Learn to Swim | | Thyrone Tommy | Canada |
| Motherly | | Craig David Wallace | Canada |
| The Noise of Engines | Le Bruit des moteurs | Philippe Grégoire | Canada |
| Old Buddies | Les Vieux chums | Claude Gagnon | Canada |
| Quickening | | Haya Waseem | Canada |
| See for Me | | Randall Okita | Canada |
| Shadowtown | Skuggahverfið | Karolina Lewicka, Jon Gustafsson | Canada, Iceland |
| Tanglewood | | Ben Bruhmuller | Canada |
| The White Fortress | Tabija | Igor Drljaca | Canada, Bosnia |
| Without Havana | Sin la Habana | Kaveh Nabatian | Canada |
| Woman in Car | | Vanya Rose | Canada |

=== Documentaries ===
| English title | Original title | Director(s) | Production country |
|---|---|---|---|
| Albedo | | Stephen A. Smith | Canada |
| Artificial Immortality | | Ann Shin | Canada |
| Big Giant Wave | Comme une vague | Marie-Julie Dallaire | Canada |
| Flee | | Jonas Poher Rasmussen | Denmark, France, Norway, Sweden |
| The Gig Is Up | | Shannon Walsh | Canada |
| Hell or Clean Water | | Cody Westman | Canada |
| My Tree | | Jason Sherman | Canada |
| Poly Styrene: I Am a Cliché | | Celeste Bell, Paul Sng | United Kingdom |
| Sisters With Transistors | | Lisa Rovner | United States |
| Someone Like Me | | Steve J. Adams, Sean Horlor | Canada |

=== World Cinema ===
| English title | Original title | Director(s) | Production country |
|---|---|---|---|
| Arthur Rambo | | Laurent Cantet | France |
| The Big Hit | Un triomphe | Emmanuel Courcol | France |
| Broken Diamonds | | Peter Sattler | United States |
| Compartment No. 6 | Hytti nro 6 | Juho Kuosmanen | Finland, Estonia, Germany, Russia |
| A Fishy Business in Saint-Pierre et Miquelon | Ça tourne à Saint-Pierre et Miquelon | Christian Monnier | France |
| Ma Belle, My Beauty | | Marion Hill | United States |
| Memory Box | | Joana Hadjithomas and Khalil Joreige | France, Lebanon, Canada, Qatar |
| Nowhere Special | | Uberto Pasolini | Italy, France |
| Wife of a Spy | スパイの妻, Supai no tsuma | Kiyoshi Kurosawa | Japan |

=== Cinema Indigenized ===
| English title | Original title | Director(s) | Production country |
|---|---|---|---|
| Bootlegger | | Caroline Monnet | Canada |
| One of Ours | | Yasmine Mathurin | Canada |
| Portraits from a Fire | | Trevor Mack | Canada |
| Run Woman Run | | Zoe Leigh Hopkins | Canada |
| Wildhood | | Bretten Hannam | Canada |
| Wochiigii lo: End of the Peace | | Heather Hatch | Canada |

=== In Full View: Crisis, Conflict, Conscience ===
| English title | Original title | Director(s) | Production country |
|---|---|---|---|
| Mass | | Fran Kranz | United States |
| Memoria | | Apichatpong Weerasethakul | Thailand, Colombia, France, Germany, Mexico, China |

=== Stir Crazy Frights and Fantasies ===
| English title | Original title | Director(s) | Production country |
|---|---|---|---|
| Cyst | | Tyler Russell | United States |
| Friday the 13th | | Sean S. Cunningham | United States |
| Kicking Blood | | Blaine Thurier | Canada |
| Titane | | Julia Ducournau | France |

=== Festival Favourites ===
| English title | Original title | Director(s) | Production country |
|---|---|---|---|
| Brain Freeze | | Julien Knafo | Canada |
| Drunk Bus | | John Carlucci, Brandon LaGanke | United States |
| El Father Plays Himself | | Mo Scarpelli | Venezuela, United Kingdom, Italy, United States |
| Fanny: The Right to Rock | | Bobbi Jo Hart | Canada |
| Kímmapiiyipitssini: The Meaning of Empathy | | Elle-Máijá Tailfeathers | Canada |
| Listen | | Ana Rocha de Sousa | Portugal |

=== Shorts ===
| English title | Original title | Director(s) | Production country |
|---|---|---|---|
| Bad Seeds | Mauvaises herbes | Claude Cloutier | Canada |
| Bleach | | Mattias Graham | Canada |
| Evan's Drum | | Ossie Michelin | Canada |
| Frimas | | Marianne Farley | Canada |
| The Frost | Le Froid | Natalia Duguay | Canada |
| The Hangman at Home | | Michelle Kranot, Uri Kranot | Canada, Denmark, France |
| Into Light | | Sheona McDonald | Canada |
| Itchy the Camel: Rakes | | Anders Beer, PH Dallair | Canada |
| Jeep Boys | | Alec Pronovost | Canada |
| Marked | | Matthew Avery Berg | United States |
| Pipo and Blind Love | Pipo et l’amour aveugle | Hugo Le Gourrierec | France |
| The Lost Seahorse | | Benjamin Fieschi-Rose | Canada |
| The Robbery | | Nika Belianina | Canada |
| Stereotype | | Nahyun Beak, Dahyun Beak | South Korea, United States |
| Talk | | Trivelle Simpson | Canada |
| Then Sings My Soul | | Susan Rodgers | Canada |
| An Uninvited Guest | | Richard B. Pierre | Canada |
