= 24th Quebec Cinema Awards =

Awards show for Quebecois cinema in 2021

The 24th Quebec Cinema Awards were held on June 5, 2022, to honour achievements in the Cinema of Quebec in 2021. The ceremony was hosted by actress Geneviève Schmidt.

Drunken Birds (Les oiseaux ivres) and Maria Chapdelaine initially received sixteen nominations each, tying the record for most nominations. Aline, a biopic inspired by the life of Celine Dion, initially received eight nominations, but due to it being a majority French production, it was deemed ineligible for the Most Successful Film Outside Quebec and the Public Prize awards and was removed from the final voting list. New nominations were announced, with Old Buddies (Les vieux chums) being nominated for the Public Prize while Drunken Birds (Les oiseaux ivres) was nominated for Most Successful Film Outside Quebec, bringing its total to seventeen nominations, a new record.

Drunken Birds (Les oiseaux ivres) swept the ceremony with ten awards, including Best Film, Best Director, Best Screenplay and two acting awards: Best Supporting Actor for Claude Legault, his second acting award, and Best Actress for Hélène Florent. Maria Chapdelaine won four awards, including two acting awards: Best Supporting Actress for Hélène Florent and Revelation of the Year for Sara Montpetit.

Hélène Florent became the seventh performer and third actress to receive two acting nominations during the same ceremony. She won both Best Actress and Best Supporting Actress, becoming the first actress in the history of the awards to win both categories in the same year.

The Time Thief (L'arracheuse de temps) received thirteen nominations, breaking the record for most nominations without a Best Film nomination. It ended up winning three awards. Beans was nominated for eleven awards, but went home empty-handed. Big Giant Wave (Comme une vague) became the second documentary to win three awards, including Best Documentary.

Visual effects director Marie-Claude Lafontaine was nominated for every film in the Best Visual Effects category, a first in the history of the awards. She won for The Time Thief (L'arracheuse de temps).

== Nominees and winners ==
Nominations were announced on April 14, 2022.

Best Film	Best Director
Drunken Birds (Les oiseaux ivres) — Luc Déry, Kim McCraw; Beans — Anne-Marie Gélinas; Maria Chapdelaine — Pierre Even, Sylvain Proulx; Norbourg — Réal Chabot; Without Havana (Sin la Habana) — Ménaïc Raoul, Gabrielle Tougas-Fréchette	Ivan Grbovic, Drunken Birds (Les oiseaux ivres); Tracey Deer, Beans; Maxime Giroux, Norbourg; Kaveh Nabatian, Without Havana (Sin la Habana); Sébastien Pilote, Maria Chapdelaine
Best Actor	Best Actress
Vincent-Guillaume Otis, Norbourg; Sylvain Marcel, Aline; Robert Naylor, The Noise of Engines (Le bruit des moteurs); Patrice Robitaille, A Revision (Une révision); Nguyen Thanh Tri, The Greatest Country in the World (Le meilleur pays du monde)	Hélène Florent, Drunken Birds (Les oiseaux ivres); Nour Belkhiria, A Revision (Une révision); Émilie Bierre, The Guide to the Perfect Family (Le guide de la famille parfaite); Pascale Bussières, Bootlegger; Danielle Fichaud, Aline
Best Supporting Actor	Best Supporting Actress
Claude Legault, Drunken Birds (Les oiseaux ivres); Guillaume Cyr, The Time Thief (L’arracheuse de temps); Martin Dubreuil, Maria Chapdelaine; Rabah Aït Ouyahia, A Revision (Une révision); Émile Schneider, Maria Chapdelaine	Hélène Florent, Maria Chapdelaine; Joséphine Bacon, Bootlegger; Christine Beaulieu, Norbourg; Céline Bonnier, The Time Thief (L'arracheuse de temps); Marine Johnson, Drunken Birds (Les oiseaux ivres)
Revelation of the Year	Best Screenplay
Sara Montpetit, Maria Chapdelaine; Yonah Acosta Gonzales, Without Havana (Sin la Habana); Rainbow Dickerson, Beans; Jorge Antonio Guerrero, Drunken Birds (Les oiseaux ivres); Kiawentiio Tarbell, Beans	Ivan Grbovic and Sara Mishara, Drunken Birds (Les oiseaux ivres); Tracey Deer and Meredith Vuchnich, Beans; Louis Godbout and Normand Corbeil, A Revision (Une révision); Kaveh Nabatian, Without Havana (Sin la Habana); Fred Pellerin, The Time Thief (L'arracheuse de temps)
Best Documentary	Best Short Documentary
Big Giant Wave (Comme une vague) — Marie-Julie Dallaire, Andrée Blais, Alex Sliman; Alone (Seuls) — Paul Tom, Julie Boisvert, Mylène Péthel, Marie-Pierre Corriveau, Karine Dubois; Archipelago (Archipel) — Félix Dufour-Laperrière, Nicolas Dufour-Laperrière; Dehors Serge dehors — Martin Fournier, Pier-Luc Latulippe, Virginie Dubois; Rumba Rules, New Genealogies (Rumba Rules, nouvelles généalogies) — Sammy Baloji, David Nadeau-Bernatchez, Rosa Spaliviero, Kiripi Katembo Siku	Perfecting the Art of Longing — Kitra Cahana, Kat Baulu, Ariel Nasr; Babushka — Kristina Wagenbauer, Line Sander Egede; Sometimes I Wish I Was on a Desert Island (Y’a des fois où j’aimerais me trouver sur une île déserte) — Eli Jean Tahchi, Pierre-Mathieu Fortin; The Truss Arch — Sonya Stefan; Under the Sleeping Mountain (Sous la montagne endormie) — Charles Duquet, Mérédith Gonzalez-Bayard
Best Live Action Short Film	Best Animated Short Film
Like the Ones I Used to Know (Les grandes claques) — Annie St-Pierre, Sarah Mannering, Fanny Drew; Fanmi — Sandrine Brodeur-Desrosiers, François Bonneau, Carmine Pierre-Dufour; In the Jam Jar — Étienne Hansez, Colin Nixon; Joutel — Alexa-Jeanne Dubé; Ousmane — Jorge Camarotti	The Displeasure (La grogne) — Alisi Telengut, Dominique Dussault; Bad Seeds (Mauvaises herbes) — Claude Cloutier, Galilé Marion-Gauvin, Élise Labbé; Boobs (Lolos) — Marie Valade; No Title (Pas de titre) — Alexandra Myotte, Jean-Sébastien Hamel; They Dance With Their Heads (Ils dansent avec leurs têtes) — Thomas Corriveau
Best Art Direction	Best Costume Design
Arnaud Brisebois, Jean Babin and Ève Turcotte, The Time Thief (L'arracheuse de temps); Éric Barbeau, The Monarch (La contemplation du mystère); André-Line Beauparlant, Drunken Birds (Les oiseaux ivres); Jean Babin, Maria Chapdelaine; Louisa Schabas, Bootlegger	Francesca Chamberland, Maria Chapdelaine; Josée Castonguay, The Time Thief (L'arracheuse de temps); Ginette Magny, Camille Janbon and Catherine Leterrier, Aline; Patricia McNeil, Drunken Birds (Les oiseaux ivres); Éric Poirier, Beans
Best Cinematography	Best Cinematography in a Documentary
Sara Mishara, Drunken Birds (Les oiseaux ivres); Steve Asselin, The Time Thief (L'arracheuse de temps); Simran Dewan, No Trace (Nulle trace); Michel La Veaux, Maria Chapdelaine; Sara Mishara, Norbourg	Tobie Marier Robitaille and Josée Deshaies, Big Giant Wave (Comme une vague); David Nadeau-Bernatchez, Sammy Baloji and Kiripi Katembo Siku, Rumba Rules, New Genealogies (Rumba Rules, nouvelles généalogies); Ariel Méthot, Dehors Serge dehors; Léna Mill-Reuillard, Sisterhood (Ainsi soient-elles); Claire Sanford and Sam Trudelle, Fanny: The Right to Rock
Best Editing	Best Editing in a Documentary
Arthur Tarnowski, Drunken Birds (Les oiseaux ivres); Sophie Farkas Bolla, Beans; Mathieu Bouchard-Malo, Norbourg; Aube Foglia, Bootlegger; Sophie Leblond, Without Havana (Sin la Habana)	Louis-Martin Paradis, Big Giant Wave (Comme une vague); Félix Dufour-Laperrière, Archipelago (Archipel); Jéricho Jeudy, Les Fils; Catherine Legault, Fanny: The Right to Rock; Jean-François Lord, Dehors Serge dehors
Best Original Music	Best Original Music in a Documentary
Philippe Brault, Drunken Birds (Les oiseaux ivres); Philippe Brault, Maria Chapdelaine; Jean Martin and Tanya Tagaq, Bootlegger; Éloi Painchaud and Fred Pellerin, The Time Thief (L'arracheuse de temps); Roger Tellier-Craig, The Monarch (La contemplation du mystère)	Stéphane Lafleur and Christophe Lamarche-Ledoux, Archipelago (Archipel); Samuel Laflamme and Dominique Fils-Aimé, Alone (Seuls); Robert Marcel Lepage, Antisemitism (Antisémitismes); Robert Marcel Lepage, My Mom's Co-op (La coop de ma mère); Projet E.V.E., Michel Robidoux and Bill Gagnon, Les Fils
Best Sound	Best Sound in a Documentary
Olivier Calvert, Stephen de Oliveira and Bernard Gariépy Strobl, Drunken Birds (Les oiseaux ivres); Stéphane Barsalou, Guillaume Daoust, Jean-François B. Sauvé and Bernard Gariépy Strobl, Bootlegger; Sylvain Bellemare, Laurent Ouellette and Hans Laitres, Without Havana (Sin La Habana); Olivier Calvert, Yann Cleary and Luc Boudrias, The Time Thief (L'arracheuse de temps); Gilles Corbeil, Olivier Calvert, Stéphane Bergeron and Bernard Gariépy Strobl, Maria Chapdelaine	Bruno Bélanger, Manon Cousin, Louis-Philippe Amyot, Ivann Uruena and René Portillo, Les Fils; Olivier Calvert, Archipelago (Archipel); Simon Gervais and Alexis Pilon-Gladu, Rumba Rules, New Genealogies (Rumba Rules, nouvelles généalogies); Luc Raymond, Guy Pelletier, François Grenon, Maxime Dumesnil and Bernard Gariépy Strobl, Big Giant Wave (Comme une vague); Daniel Toussaint and Ginette Bellavance, Fanny: The Right to Rock
Best Hairstyling	Best Makeup
Martin Lapointe, Maria Chapdelaine; Frédéric Bélanger, Brain Freeze; Lyne Lapiana, Sandrine Masson, Silvine Picard and Rémy Pilot, Aline; Janie Otis, The Time Thief (L'arracheuse de temps); Pamela Warden, Beans	Adriana Verbert and Bruno Gatien, The Time Thief (L'arracheuse de temps); Djina Caron, Maria Chapdelaine; Marie-Josée Galibert, Drunken Birds (Les oiseaux ivres); Erik Gosselin and Edwina Voda, Brain Freeze; Kathy Kelso, Marie Lastennet and Sarah Mescoff, Aline
Best Visual Effects	Best Casting
Alain Lachance, Loïc Laurelut, Éric Clément and Marie-Claude Lafontaine, The Time Thief (L'arracheuse de temps); Jean-François Ferland and Marie-Claude Lafontaine, Maria Chapdelaine; Maxime Lapointe, and Marie-Claude Lafontaine, Goodbye Happiness (Au revoir le bonheur)	Nathalie Boutrie, Drunken Birds (Les oiseaux ivres); Isabelle Thez Axelrad and Brigitte Viau, The Time Thief (L'arracheuse de temps); Nathalie Boutrie, Aline; Maxime Giroux and Rene Haynes, Beans; Pierre Pageau and Daniel Poisson, Maria Chapdelaine
Most Successful Film Outside Quebec	Public Prize
Bootlegger — Caroline Monnet; Beans — Tracey Deer; Drunken Birds (Les oiseaux ivres) - Ivan Grbovic; Felix and the Treasure of Morgäa (Félix et le trésor de Morgäa) — Nicola Lemay; Saint-Narcisse — Bruce LaBruce	Sam; Drunken Birds (Les oiseaux ivres); Goodbye Happiness (Au revoir le bonheur); The Guide to the Perfect Family (Le guide de la famille parfaite); Maria; Maria Chapdelaine; Old Buddies (Les vieux chums); The Perfect Victim (La victime parfaite); A Revision (Une révision); The Time Thief (L'arracheuse de temps)
Best First Film	Iris Tribute
Without Havana (Sin la Habana) — Kaveh Nabatian; Beans — Tracey Deer; Bootlegger — Caroline Monnet	Louise Portal

== Multiple wins and nominations ==
=== Films with multiple nominations ===
Nominations	Film
17	Drunken Birds (Les oiseaux ivres)
16	Maria Chapdelaine
13	The Time Thief (L'arracheuse de temps)
11	Beans
8	Bootlegger
7	Without Havana (Sin la Habana)
6	Aline
6	Norbourg
5	A Revision (Une révision)
4	Archipelago (Archipel)
4	Big Giant Wave (Comme une vague)
3	Dehors Serge dehors
3	Fanny: The Right to Rock
3	Les Fils
3	Rumba Rules, New Genealogies (Rumba Rules, nouvelles généalogies)
2	Alone (Seuls)
2	Brain Freeze
2	Goodbye Happiness (Au revoir le bonheur)
2	The Guide to the Perfect Family (Le guide de la famille parfaite)
2	The Monarch (La contemplation du mystère)

=== Films with multiple wins ===
Wins	Film
10	Drunken Birds (Les oiseaux ivres)
4	Maria Chapdelaine
3	Big Giant Wave (Comme une vague)
3	The Time Thief (L'arracheuse de temps)
