= Prix Iris for Best Documentary Film =

Annual Canadian film award

The Prix Iris for Best Documentary Film (French: Prix Iris du meilleur film documentaire) is an annual film award presented by Québec Cinéma as part of its Prix Iris program, to honour the year's best documentary film made within the cinema of Quebec.

Until 2016, it was known as the Jutra Award for Best Documentary in memory of influential Quebec film director Claude Jutra. Following the withdrawal of Jutra's name from the award, the 2016 award was presented under the name Québec Cinéma. The Prix Iris name was announced in October 2016.

Patricio Henríquez is the most nominated and decorated filmmaker in this category, receiving three awards from five nominations. Producer Colette Loumède is the only person to receive multiple nominations in the same year in this category, with three films nominated in 2015, including eventual winner Finding Macpherson.

Two ties occurred in this category: À Hauteur d'homme and Roger Toupin, épicier variété both won the award during the 6th Jutra Awards, while La classe de Madame Lise and Gilles Carle: The Untamable Mind (Gilles Carle ou l'indomptable imaginaire) tied during the 8th Jutra Awards.

Cielo, Bestiaire and Manufacturing the Threat are the only documentaries to be nominated for Most Successful Film Outside Quebec. Three documentaries were nominated for the Public Prize award: Call Me Human (Je m'appelle humain), The Perfect Victim (La parfaite victime) and eventual winner The Rose Family (Les Rose). Of these, only Call Me Human (Je m'appelle humain) also received a nomination for Best Documentary Film.

== 1990s ==
Year	Film	Filmmakers	Ref
1999; 1st Jutra Awards
1999; 1st Jutra Awards	Forest Alert (L'erreur boréale)	Richard Desjardins, Robert Monderie	
1999; 1st Jutra Awards	Charles Daudelin (Charles Daudelin, des mains et des mots)	Richard Lavoie	
1999; 1st Jutra Awards	Dans la gueule du crocodile	Lucie Ouimet, Catherine Larivain	
1999; 1st Jutra Awards	Voyage illusoire	Georges Dufaux	

== 2000s ==
Year	Film	Filmmakers	Ref
2000; 2nd Jutra Awards
2000; 2nd Jutra Awards	Images of a Dictatorship (Images d'une dictature)	Patricio Henríquez	
2000; 2nd Jutra Awards	Before Daybreak (Avant le jour)	Lucie Lambert	
2000; 2nd Jutra Awards	The Choir Boys (Enfants de chœurs !)	Magnus Isacsson	
2000; 2nd Jutra Awards	Light of the Snow Geese (Lumière des oiseaux)	Jean-Philippe Duval	
2000; 2nd Jutra Awards	The Megaphone Reel (Le réel du mégaphone)	Serge Giguère	
2001; 3rd Jutra Awards
2001; 3rd Jutra Awards	Searching for Louis Archambault (À la recherche de Louis Archambault)	Werner Volkmer	
2001; 3rd Jutra Awards	Guantanamera Boxe	Richard Jean-Baptiste, Yann Langevin	
2001; 3rd Jutra Awards	If Only I	Donigan Cumming	
2001; 3rd Jutra Awards	Man of Grease	Ezra Soiferman	
2002; 4th Jutra Awards
2002; 4th Jutra Awards	Blue Potatoes (Le Minot d'or)	Isabelle Raynauld	
2002; 4th Jutra Awards	4125 Parthenais (Le 4125, rue Parthenais)	Isabelle Lavigne	
2002; 4th Jutra Awards	My Dinner with Weegee	Donigan Cumming	
2002; 4th Jutra Awards	Three Princesses for Roland (Trois princesses pour Roland)	André-Line Beauparlant	
2003; 5th Jutra Awards
2003; 5th Jutra Awards	A Falconer's Chronicle (Rien sans pennes)	Marc Girard	
2003; 5th Jutra Awards	Les derniers chasseurs du petit havre	Dominique Morissette, Catherine Pappas	
2003; 5th Jutra Awards	The Library: Between a Rock and a Hard Place (La bibliothèque entre deux feux)	Serge Cardinal	
2003; 5th Jutra Awards	My Eye for a Camera (Mon œil pour une caméra)	Denys Desjardins	
2004; 6th Jutra Awards
2004; 6th Jutra Awards	À Hauteur d'homme	Jean-Claude Labrecque	
2004; 6th Jutra Awards	Roger Toupin, épicier variété	Benoît Pilon	
2004; 6th Jutra Awards	The Fifth Province (La Cinquième Province)	Donald McWilliams	
2004; 6th Jutra Awards	Something Like Immortality (L'immortalité en fin de compte)	Pascale Ferland	
2005; 7th Jutra Awards
2005; 7th Jutra Awards	What Remains of Us (Ce qu'il reste de nous)	François Prévost, Hugo Latulippe	
2005; 7th Jutra Awards	East End Kids (Vues de l'est)	Carole Laganière	
2005; 7th Jutra Awards	Le petit Jésus	André-Line Beauparlant	
2005; 7th Jutra Awards	Soraida: A Woman of Palestine (Soraida, une femme de Palestine)	Tahani Rached	
2006; 8th Jutra Awards
2006; 8th Jutra Awards	La Classe de Madame Lise	Sylvie Groulx	
2006; 8th Jutra Awards	Gilles Carle: The Untamable Mind (Gilles Carle ou l'indomptable imaginaire)	Charles Binamé	
2006; 8th Jutra Awards	Perreault Dancer (Danser Perreault)	Tim Southam	
2006; 8th Jutra Awards	Who Shot My Brother? (Qui a tiré sur mon frère?)	German Gutierrez, Carmen Garcia	
2007; 9th Jutra Awards
2007; 9th Jutra Awards	Driven by Dreams (À force de rêves)	Serge Giguère	
2007; 9th Jutra Awards	The Dark Side of the White Lady (Le côté obscur de la dame blanche)	Patricio Henríquez	
2007; 9th Jutra Awards	Notre père	Marie-Julie Dallaire	
2007; 9th Jutra Awards	The River Where We Live (Un fleuve humain)	Sylvain L'Espérance	
2008; 10th Jutra Awards
2008; 10th Jutra Awards	The Invisible Nation (Le peuple invisible)	Richard Desjardins, Robert Monderie	
2008; 10th Jutra Awards	Americano	Carlos Ferrand	
2008; 10th Jutra Awards	The Great Resistance (Au pays des colons)	Denys Desjardins	
2008; 10th Jutra Awards	Up the Yangtze	Yung Chang	
2009; 11th Jutra Awards
2009; 11th Jutra Awards	Under the Hood: A Voyage Into the World of Torture (Sous la cagoule, un voyage au bout de la torture)	Patricio Henríquez	
2009; 11th Jutra Awards	The Memories of Angels (La mémoire des anges)	Luc Bourdon	
2009; 11th Jutra Awards	My Father's Studio (L'atelier de mon père)	Jennifer Alleyn	
2009; 11th Jutra Awards	The Other Side of the Country (De l'autre côté du pays)	Catherine Hébert	

== 2010s ==
Year	Film	Filmmakers	Ref
2010; 12th Jutra Awards
2010; 12th Jutra Awards	Last Train Home	Lixin Fan	
2010; 12th Jutra Awards	Antoine	Laura Bari	
2010; 12th Jutra Awards	Men for Sale (Hommes à louer)	Rodrigue Jean	
2010; 12th Jutra Awards	Shots in the Dark (Silence, on vaccine)	Lina B. Moreco	
2010; 12th Jutra Awards	A Tent on Mars (Une tente sur mars)	Martin Bureau, Luc Renaud	
2011; 13th Jutra Awards
2011; 13th Jutra Awards	Falardeau	Carmen Garcia, German Gutierrez	
2011; 13th Jutra Awards	Heart of Auschwitz (Le cœur d'Auschwitz)	Carl Leblanc	
2011; 13th Jutra Awards	Hope Builders (Les porteurs d'espoir)	Fernand Dansereau	
2011; 13th Jutra Awards	Journey's End (La belle visite)	Jean-François Caissy	
2011; 13th Jutra Awards	You Don't Like the Truth: Four Days Inside Guantanamo	Luc Côté, Patricio Henríquez	
2012; 14th Jutra Awards
2012; 14th Jutra Awards	The Heart that Beats (Ce cœur qui bat)	Philippe Lesage	
2012; 14th Jutra Awards	At Night, They Dance (La nuit, elles dansent)	Isabelle Lavigne, Stéphane Thibault	
2012; 14th Jutra Awards	Inside Lara Roxx	Mia Donovan	
2012; 14th Jutra Awards	John Max, a Portrait	Michel Lamothe	
2012; 14th Jutra Awards	Turtles Do Not Die of Old Age (Les tortues ne meurent pas de vieillesse)	Hind Benchekroun, Sami Mermer	
2013; 15th Jutra Awards
2013; 15th Jutra Awards	Over My Dead Body	Brigitte Poupart	
2013; 15th Jutra Awards	Alphée of the Stars (Alphée des étoiles)	Hugo Latulippe	
2013; 15th Jutra Awards	Bestiaire	Denis Côté	
2013; 15th Jutra Awards	Mort subite d'un homme-théâtre	Jean-Claude Coulbois	
2013; 15th Jutra Awards	My Real Life (Ma vie réelle)	Magnus Isacsson	
2014; 16th Jutra Awards
2014; 16th Jutra Awards	Waiting for Spring (En attendant le printemps)	Marie-Geneviève Chabot	
2014; 16th Jutra Awards	Frameworks: Images of a Changing World (Dans un océan d'images)	Helen Doyle	
2014; 16th Jutra Awards	Silence Is Gold (Le prix des mots)	Julien Fréchette	
2014; 16th Jutra Awards	Québékoisie	Mélanie Carrier, Olivier Higgins	
2014; 16th Jutra Awards	Wavemakers (Le chant des ondes)	Caroline Martel	
2015; 17th Jutra Awards
2015; 17th Jutra Awards	Finding Macpherson (Le mystère Macpherson)	Serge Giguère, Nicole Hubert, Colette Loumède, Sylvie Van Brabant	
2015; 17th Jutra Awards	From Prisons to Prisons (De prisons en prisons)	Steve Patry	
2015; 17th Jutra Awards	Grandma (Bà nôi)	Khoa Lê, Karine Dubois	
2015; 17th Jutra Awards	Guidelines (La marche à suivre)	Jean-François Caissy, Johanne Bergeron, Colette Loumède	
2015; 17th Jutra Awards	Self(less) Portrait (Autoportrait sans moi)	Danic Champoux, Colette Loumède	
2016; 18th Quebec Cinema Awards
2016; 18th Quebec Cinema Awards	Uyghurs: Prisoners of the Absurd (Ouïghours, prisonniers de l'absurde)	Patricio Henríquez	
2016; 18th Quebec Cinema Awards	The Amina Profile (Le profil Amina)	Sophie Deraspe	
2016; 18th Quebec Cinema Awards	Footprints (L'empreinte)	Yvan Dubuc, Carole Poliquin	
2016; 18th Quebec Cinema Awards	L'Or du golfe	Ian Jaquier	
2016; 18th Quebec Cinema Awards	The Price We Pay (Le prix à payer)	Harold Crooks	
2017; 19th Quebec Cinema Awards
2017; 19th Quebec Cinema Awards	Manor (Manoir)	Martin Fournier, Pier-Luc Latulippe	
2017; 19th Quebec Cinema Awards	Callshop Istanbul	Hind Benchekroun, Sami Mermer	
2017; 19th Quebec Cinema Awards	Gulîstan, Land of Roses (Gulîstan, terre de roses)	Zaynê Akyol, Mehmet Aktaş, Nathalie Cloutier, Fanny Drew, Yanick Létourneau, Sarah Mannering, Denis McCready	
2017; 19th Quebec Cinema Awards	Living With Giants (Chez les géants)	Aude Leroux-Lévesque, Sébastien Rist, Jean-Simon Chartier	
2017; 19th Quebec Cinema Awards	Perfect (Parfaites)	Jérémie Battaglia, Sylvie Van Brabant	
2018; 20th Quebec Cinema Awards
2018; 20th Quebec Cinema Awards	Resurrecting Hassan (La résurrection d'Hassan)	Carlo Guillermo Proto	
2018; 20th Quebec Cinema Awards	Destierros	Hubert Caron-Guay	
2018; 20th Quebec Cinema Awards	The Devil's Share (La part du diable)	Luc Bourdon, Colette Loumède	
2018; 20th Quebec Cinema Awards	Manic	Kalina Bertin, Marina Serrao	
2018; 20th Quebec Cinema Awards	A Moon of Nickel and Ice (Sur la lune de nickel)	François Jacob, Christine Falco, Vuk Stojanovic	
2019; 21st Quebec Cinema Awards
2019; 21st Quebec Cinema Awards	Innu Nikamu: Resist and Sing (Innu Nikamu: Chanter la résistance)	Kevin Bacon-Hervieux, Ian Boyd	
2019; 21st Quebec Cinema Awards	Anote's Ark	Matthieu Rytz	
2019; 21st Quebec Cinema Awards	Cielo	Alison McAlpine, Paola Castillo	
2019; 21st Quebec Cinema Awards	The Other Rio (L'autre Rio)	Émilie Beaulieu-Guérette, Fanny Drew, Geneviève Dulude-De Celles, Sarah Mannering	
2019; 21st Quebec Cinema Awards	Pauline Julien, Intimate and Political (Pauline Julien, intime et politique)	Pascale Ferland, Johanne Bergeron	

== 2020s ==
Year	Film	Filmmakers	Ref
2020; 22nd Quebec Cinema Awards
2020; 22nd Quebec Cinema Awards	Xalko	Hind Benchekroun, Sami Mermer	
2020; 22nd Quebec Cinema Awards	Alexander Odyssey (Alexandre le fou)	Pedro Pires	
2020; 22nd Quebec Cinema Awards	Dark Suns (Soleils noirs)	Julien Élie	
2020; 22nd Quebec Cinema Awards	Mad Dog and the Butcher (Les derniers vilains)	Thomas Rinfret, Vito Balenzano, Valérie Bissonette, Bruno Rosato	
2020; 22nd Quebec Cinema Awards	Ziva Postec: The Editor Behind the Film Shoah (Ziva Postec: La monteuse derrière le film Shoah)	Catherine Hébert, Christine Falco	
2021; 23rd Quebec Cinema Awards
2021; 23rd Quebec Cinema Awards	Wandering: A Rohingya Story (Errance sans retour)	Mélanie Carrier, Olivier Higgins	
2021; 23rd Quebec Cinema Awards	Call Me Human (Je m’appelle humain)	Kim O'Bomsawin, Andrée-Anne Frenette	
2021; 23rd Quebec Cinema Awards	The Forbidden Reel	Ariel Nasr, Kat Baulu, Sergeo Kirby	
2021; 23rd Quebec Cinema Awards	I Might Be Dead by Tomorrow (Tant que j'ai du respir dans le corps)	Steve Patry	
2021; 23rd Quebec Cinema Awards	Wintopia	Mira Burt-Wintonick, Annette Clarke, Bob Moore	
2022; 24th Quebec Cinema Awards
2022; 24th Quebec Cinema Awards	Big Giant Wave (Comme une vague)	Marie-Julie Dallaire, Andrée Blais, Alex Sliman	
2022; 24th Quebec Cinema Awards	Alone (Seuls)	Paul Tom, Julie Boisvert, Mylène Péthel, Marie-Pierre Corriveau, Karine Dubois	
2022; 24th Quebec Cinema Awards	Archipelago (Archipel)	Félix Dufour-Laperrière, Nicolas Dufour-Laperrière	
2022; 24th Quebec Cinema Awards	Dehors Serge dehors	Martin Fournier, Pier-Luc Latulippe, Virginie Dubois	
2022; 24th Quebec Cinema Awards	Rumba Rules, New Genealogies (Rumba Rules, nouvelles généalogies)	Sammy Baloji, David Nadeau-Bernatchez, Rosa Spaliviero, Kiripi Katembo Siku	
2023; 25th Quebec Cinema Awards
2023; 25th Quebec Cinema Awards	Dear Audrey	Jeremiah Hayes, André Barro, Annette Clarke	
2023; 25th Quebec Cinema Awards	Backlash: Misogyny in the Digital Age (Je vous salue salope : La misogynie au temps du numérique)	Léa Clermont-Dion, Guylaine Maroist, Éric Ruel	
2023; 25th Quebec Cinema Awards	Gabor	Joannie Lafrenière, Line Sander Egede	
2023; 25th Quebec Cinema Awards	Geographies of Solitude	Jacquelyn Mills, Rosalie Chicoine Perreault	
2023; 25th Quebec Cinema Awards	Rojek	Zaynê Akyol, Sylvain Corbeil, Audrey-Ann Dupuis-Pierre	
2024; 26th Quebec Cinema Awards
2024; 26th Quebec Cinema Awards	Kite Zo A: Leave the Bones (Kite Zo A: Laisse les os)	Kaveh Nabatian, Joseph Ray, Zach Niles	
2024; 26th Quebec Cinema Awards	After the Odyssey (Au lendemain de l'odyssée)	Helen Doyle	
2024; 26th Quebec Cinema Awards	Days (Les Jours)	Geneviève Dulude-De Celles, Fanny Drew, Sarah Mannering	
2024; 26th Quebec Cinema Awards	Scratches of Life: The Art of Pierre Hébert (Graver l'homme: arrêt sur Pierre Hébert)	Loïc Darses, Marc Bertrand	
2024; 26th Quebec Cinema Awards	Wild Feast (Festin boréal)	Robert Morin, Cédric Bourdeau, Louis Laverdière, Stéphane Tanguay	
2025; 27th Quebec Cinema Awards
2025; 27th Quebec Cinema Awards	Intercepted	Oksana Karpovych, Rocío Barba Fuentes, Giacomo Nudi, Pauline Tran Van Lieu, Lucie Rego, Darya Bassel, Olha Beskhmelnytsina	
2025; 27th Quebec Cinema Awards	Among Mountains and Streams (Parmi les montagnes et les ruisseaux)	Jean-François Lesage	
2025; 27th Quebec Cinema Awards	The Battle of Saint-Léonard (La bataille de Saint-Léonard)	Félix Rose, Karine Dubois	
2025; 27th Quebec Cinema Awards	I Shall Not Hate	Tal Barda, Geoff Klein, Saskia de Boer, Maryse Rouillard, Paul Cadieux, Isabelle Gripon	
2025; 27th Quebec Cinema Awards	Simon and Marianne (Simon et Marianne)	Pier-Luc Latulippe, Martin Fournier	

== Multiple wins and nominations ==
=== Multiple wins ===
Wins	Filmmakers
3	Patricio Henríquez
2	Richard Desjardins
2	Serge Giguère
2	Robert Monderie

=== Three or more nominations ===
Nominations	Filmmaker
5	Patricio Henríquez
4	Colette Loumède
3	Hind Benchekroun
3	Fanny Drew
3	Karine Dubois
3	Martin Fournier
3	Serge Giguère
3	Pier-Luc Latulippe
3	Sarah Mannering
3	Sami Mermer

== See also ==
- Canadian Screen Award for Best Feature Length Documentary
