= Call Me Human =

2020 Canadian documentary film

- Film poster
- French: Je m'appelle humain
- Directed by: Kim O'Bomsawin
- Written by: Kim O'Bomsawin
- Produced by: Andrée-Anne Frenette
- Starring: Joséphine Bacon
- Cinematography: Hugo Gendron; Michel Valiquette
- Edited by: Alexandre Lachance
- Music by: Alain Auger
- Production company: Terre Innue
- Distributed by: Maison 4:3
- Release date: September 18, 2020 (FCVQ)
- Running time: 78 minutes
- Country: Canada
- Languages: French; Innu-aimun

Call Me Human (French: Je m'appelle humain) is a Canadian documentary film, directed by Kim O'Bomsawin and released in 2020. The film is a portrait of Innu poet Joséphine Bacon.

The film premiered at the Quebec City Film Festival. It was subsequently screened at the 2020 Cinéfest Sudbury International Film Festival and the 2020 Vancouver International Film Festival, and had its commercial premiere on November 13.

== Awards ==
At the Quebec City Film festival, the film was cowinner of the Prix Jury collégial with Alexandre Rockwell's Sweet Thing. At Cinefest, it won the Audience Choice Award for documentaries, and at VIFF, it won the juried award for Best Canadian Documentary Film.

The film initially received three Prix Iris nominations at the 23rd Quebec Cinema Awards in 2021, for Best Documentary, Best Cinematography in a Documentary (Hugo Gendron, Michel Valiquette) and Best Editing in a Documentary (Alexandre Lachance). After the organization decided to add the eligible documentary films to its Public Prize ballot, the film was also named as a nominee in that category.

The film won the Prix collégial du cinéma québécois in 2021.
