= Matthieu Rytz =

Matthieu Rytz is a Canadian documentary filmmaker, most noted for his 2018 film Anote's Ark. He received a Canadian Screen Award nomination for Best Cinematography in a Documentary at the 7th Canadian Screen Awards, and Prix Iris nominations for Best Documentary Film and Best Cinematography in a Documentary at the 21st Quebec Cinema Awards.

His second documentary film, Deep Rising, premiered at the 2023 Sundance Film Festival. In 2024, he was co-director with Hubert Hayaud and Larry Towell of the documentary film The Man I Left Behind.
