= Dolls Don't Cry =

- French: Toutes les poupées ne pleurent pas
- Directed by: Frédérick Tremblay
- Written by: Frédérick Tremblay
- Produced by: Pierre Lesage; Frédérick Tremblay
- Edited by: Frédérick Tremblay
- Music by: Bruno Bélanger; Jean-Philippe Lessard
- Release date: 2017
- Running time: 20 minutes
- Country: Canada

Dolls Don't Cry (French: Toutes les poupées ne pleurent pas) is a 2017 Canadian stop-motion animated short film directed by Frédérick Tremblay. The film is about animators, a man and a woman, who are painstakingly making a stop-motion animated film.

The film won the Grand Jury Prize for Best Canadian Short Film at the 2017 Quebec City Film Festival, and the Prix Iris for Best Animated Short Film at the 20th Quebec Cinema Awards in 2018.

The short film is available to watch on Tremblay's official Vimeo channel.

== Plot ==
A red-haired man and a blond-haired woman are making a stop-motion animated film about a male wolf and a female rabbit's star-crossed romance, the project being made entirely in the studio at the man's apartment. The two animators take turns making the stop-motion film: every night, the man poses the puppets and shoots the scenes; every day, the woman goes to his apartment while he is sleeping to make sets and props and repair damaged puppets.

One day, the woman is surprised to see a bald human-sized female puppet living in a hallway hidden by the man's cupboard. The woman paints the puppet's face and the two become acquainted with the former showing the latter the making of the man's stop- motion film. Before the man wakes up, the woman helps the puppet return to the secret hall before ending her shift. Unaware of the female puppet's existence, the man resumes directing his film. The following day, the woman returns with clothes and shoes for the puppet, who has somehow painted her entire body. The woman and the puppet dance to C.P.E. Bach's music before falling asleep on the man's couch. That night, the man wakes up and is surprised to find his colleague at home (the puppet has returned to her hideout).

The man treats the woman to dinner before they resume making the film. After finishing for the night, the man and the woman have sex, with the puppet quietly observing them through a small window. The following day the man shoots the film's climax, leaving the woman to sleep in his bed. The woman later wakes up to the man sleeping beside her; before she leaves, her right hand falls off but she quickly reattaches it.

The following day, both the man and the woman are awake and proceed to finish making the film. The puppet-now a bald look-like of the woman-leads her into the secret hallway, revealing other discarded and damaged human-sized dolls that look similar to the woman. Horrified, the woman flees, but trips while exiting the cupboard and further damages her body. The man hears the commotion and is about to open the studio door when he, the woman, and the puppet all freeze. The three are revealed to be characters in a stop-motion film being made by an unseen animator. The animator places the woman into the pile of discarded dolls before transferring her hair to the puppet's head.

After posing the man and the new woman, the animator resumes making the film. The man opens the studio door to let in the woman, who is holding the cups of tea she has made. The two animators drink their tea and look at the film's set.
