= Sisterhood (2019 film) =

2019 documentary film by Maxime Faure

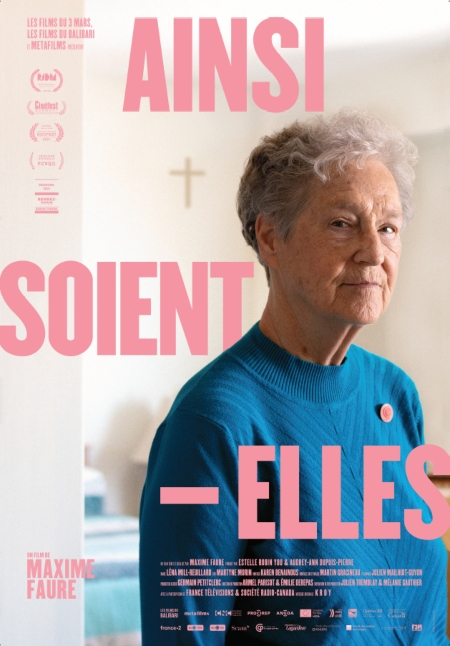
- French: Ainsi soient-elles
- Directed by: Maxime Faure
- Produced by: Audrey-Ann Dupuis-Pierre; Estelle Robin You
- Cinematography: Léna Mill-Reuillard
- Edited by: Karen Benainous
- Music by: Camille Poliquin
- Production companies: Les Films du Balibari; Metafilms
- Release date: November 17, 2019 (RIDM)
- Running time: 75 minutes
- Country: Canada

Sisterhood (French: Ainsi soient-elles) is a Canadian documentary film, directed by Maxime Faure and released in 2019. The film profiles the Society of Helpers of the Holy Spirit, a Montreal-based social justice-oriented order of Roman Catholic nuns who are now in decline as only eight of them remain and all are in their 80s.

The film premiered in November 2019 at the Montreal International Documentary Festival, and continued to have film festival screenings in 2020, although due to the disruptions of film distribution in 2020 caused by the COVID-19 pandemic, it only went into wider commercial release in 2021.

Léna Mill-Reuillard received a Prix Iris nomination for Best Cinematography in a Documentary at the 24th Quebec Cinema Awards in 2022.
