= Anote's Ark =

- Directed by: Matthieu Rytz
- Produced by: Matthieu Rytz
- Starring: Anote Tong
- Cinematography: Matthieu Rytz
- Edited by: Mila Aung-Thwin; Oana Suteu
- Music by: Patrick Watson
- Production company: EyeSteelFilm
- Release date: January 19, 2018 (Sundance)
- Running time: 77 minutes
- Country: Canada
- Language: English

Anote's Ark is a 2018 Canadian documentary film directed by Matthieu Rytz. Profiling the impact of climate change on the island nation of Kiribati, which will be one of the first nations on earth to entirely disappear underwater in the event of a sustained sea level rise, the film tells the stories of the nation's former president Anote Tong, who intensely lobbied the international community to take action on the threat, and of Sermary Tiare, an I-Kiribati woman who decides to protect her family by emigrating to New Zealand.

The film premiered in January 2018 at the 2018 Sundance Film Festival. It had its Canadian premiere at the Hot Docs Canadian International Documentary Festival.

The film faced some criticism from the current government of Kiribati, which alleged that Rytz did not follow proper journalistic ethics in making the film. Rytz countered that the criticism was simply part of the current government's attempts to crack down on freedom of the press in the country.

Rytz received a Canadian Screen Award nomination for Best Cinematography in a Documentary at the 7th Canadian Screen Awards, and Prix Iris nominations for Best Documentary Film, Best Cinematography in a Documentary and Best Editing in a Documentary at the 21st Quebec Cinema Awards.
