= Olivier Tétreault =

Olivier Tétreault (born October 12, 1975) is a Canadian cinematographer and film director from Quebec.

== Filmography ==
- Gus et le premier monde - 1999, director
- La Belle paix - 2005, director
- Folies passagères, contes trash et sournois - 2004, cinematographer
- Emilio - 2005, cinematographer
- Freestyle Bowling! - 2008, director
- Library Rats - 2008, director
- Fantasy (Fantasme) - 2009, cinematographer
- Manor (Manoir) - 2016, cinematographer
- A Woman, My Mother (Une femme, ma mère) - 2019, cinematographer
- Diary of a Father (Journal d'un père) - 2023, cinematographer
- Ils étaient - 2024, director

== Awards ==
Award	Year	Category	Work	Result	Ref(s)
Canadian Screen Awards	2025	Best Cinematography in a Documentary	Diary of a Father (Journal d'un père) with Claude Demers, François Messier-Rheault	Nominated	
Prix Iris	2017	Best Cinematography in a Documentary	Manor (Manoir)	Nominated	
