= Rumba Rules, New Genealogies =

2020 documentary film

- French: Rumba Rules, nouvelles généalogies
- Directed by: Sammy Baloji; David Nadeau-Bernatchez
- Written by: Sammy Baloji
- Produced by: Rosa Spaliviero
- Cinematography: Kiripi Katembo Siku
- Edited by: David Nadeau-Bernatchez
- Production company: Twenty Nine Studio
- Distributed by: Spira
- Release date: November 24, 2020 (IDFA)
- Running time: 108 minutes
- Countries: Canada; Belgium; Democratic Republic of the Congo
- Language: Lingala

Rumba Rules, New Genealogies (French: Rumba Rules, nouvelles généalogies) is a documentary film, directed by Sammy Baloji and David Nadeau-Bernatchez and released in 2020. A coproduction of companies from Canada, Belgium and the Democratic Republic of the Congo, the film is a portrait of the music scene in Kinshasa, centred in particular on the Congolese rumba group Orchestre de Brigade Sarbati.

The film premiered in November 2020 at the International Documentary Film Festival Amsterdam, and had its Canadian premiere in September 2021.

== Awards ==
Award	Date of ceremony	Category	Recipient(s)	Result	Ref(s)
Prix Iris	2022	Best Documentary Film	David Nadeau-Bernatchez, Sammy Baloji, Kiripi Katembo Siku, Rosa Spaliviero	Nominated	
Prix Iris	2022	Best Cinematography in a Documentary	David Nadeau-Bernatchez, Sammy Baloji, Kiripi Katembo Siku	Nominated	
Prix Iris	2022	Best Sound in a Documentary	Simon Gervais, Alexis Pilon-Gladu	Nominated	
