= Dominique Fils-Aimé =

Canadian singer (born 1984)

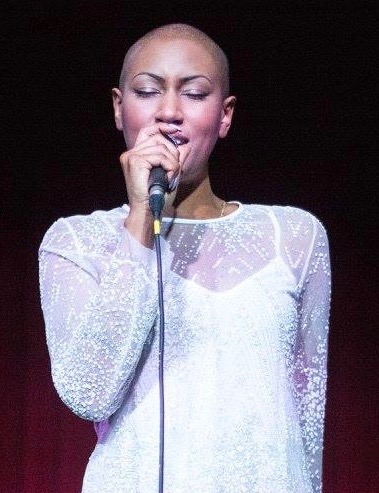

Background information
- Born: July 10, 1984 (age 42); Montreal, Quebec, Canada
- Genres: Blues, jazz, rhythm and blues
- Occupations: Musician, songwriter
- Instrument: Vocalist
- Years active: 2010s–present
- Label: Ensoul Records
- Website: https://domiofficial.com/en/

Dominique Fils-Aimé (French pronunciation: [dɔminik fis ɛme]) is a Canadian singer from Quebec, whose album Stay Tuned! was shortlisted for the 2019 Polaris Music Prize and won the Juno Award for Vocal Jazz Album of the Year at the Juno Awards of 2020.

Born and raised in Montreal to immigrant parents from Haiti, Fils-Aimé was a competitor in the third season of TVA's singing competition series La Voix in 2015. She was eliminated in the semi-final round by Matt Holubowski.

In 2018 she released Nameless, her debut album which explored blues music as the first installment in a trilogy devoted to the history of African-American music.

Stay Tuned!, which explores jazz music, followed in 2019 as the second album in the trilogy. This album won the Félix for Jazz Album of the Year at the 2019 ADISQ gala. It was chosen as one of CBC's top 19 Canadian albums of 2019. A European version of the album has been released in late 2019, followed by a first sold-out tour of France.

Her third album, Three Little Words, was released in 2021 and focuses on soul music. The album was shortlisted for the 2021 Polaris Music Prize.

At the 24th Quebec Cinema Awards in 2022, Fils-Aimé and Samuel Laflamme received a nomination for Best Original Music in a Documentary for their work on the film Alone (Seuls).

In 2023, she participated in an all-star recording of Serena Ryder's single "What I Wouldn't Do", which was released as a charity single to benefit Kids Help Phone's Feel Out Loud campaign for youth mental health.

Her 2023 album Our Roots Run Deep was a longlisted nominee for the 2024 Polaris Music Prize, won the Juno Award for Vocal Jazz Album of the Year at the Juno Awards of 2024, and won the Félix for Jazz Album of the Year at the 46th Félix Awards.

My World Is the Sun was longlisted for the 2026 Polaris Music Prize.

== Discography ==
- Nameless (2018)
- Stay Tuned! (2019)
- Three Little Words (2021)
- Our Roots Run Deep (2023)
- My World Is the Sun (2026)
