= Roger Toupin, épicier variété =

2003 Canadian documentary film

- Directed by: Benoît Pilon
- Produced by: Jeannine Gagné
- Starring: Roger Toupin
- Cinematography: Michel La Veaux
- Edited by: René Roberge
- Music by: Robert Marcel Lepage
- Production company: Amazone Film
- Distributed by: Cinéma Libre
- Release date: November 14, 2003 (RIDM)
- Running time: 82 minutes
- Country: Canada
- Language: French

Roger Toupin, épicier variété is a Canadian documentary film, directed by Benoît Pilon and released in 2003. The film profiles Roger Toupin, a shopkeeper in Montreal's Plateau-Mont-Royal borough who is being forced to sell his shop, and the residential apartment above it where he has lived for his entire life, due to the rising costs of running an independent business.

The film premiered on November 14, 2003, at the Montreal International Documentary Festival, where it received a standing ovation that lasted over 10 minutes. It went into commercial release in December.

The film was co-winner, with Jean-Claude Labrecque's À Hauteur d'homme, of the Jutra Award for Best Documentary Film at the 6th Jutra Awards in 2004.
