= Khoa Lê =

Canadian-Vietnamese film and stage director, producer and screenwriter

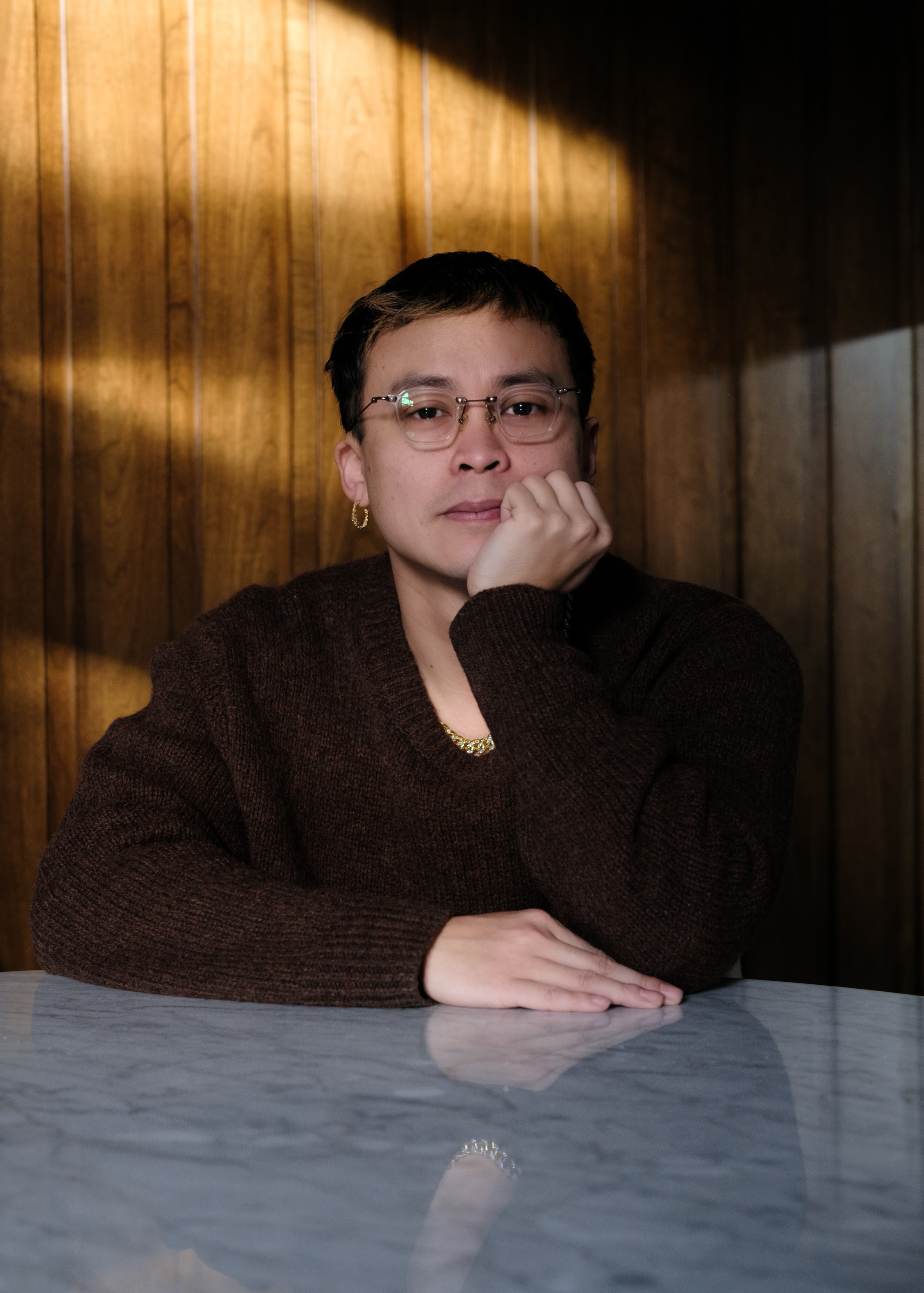
- Born: Vietnam
- Occupation: Director
- Years active: 2008–present
- Website: lekhoa.com

Khoa Lê is a Canadian-Vietnamese film director, stage director, producer and screenwriter based in Montreal.

== Life ==
Lê was born in Vietnam. He lives and works in Montreal. He did a bachelor's degree in film direction at the Université du Québec à Montréal between 2004 and 2008 and a training in film production at the Institut national de l'image et du son in 2008.

After studying he created several short films. His first feature documentary film Bà nôi won awards at Hot Docs Canadian International Documentary Festival and Montreal International Documentary Festival in 2013 and was nominated as best documentary film at the 2015 Jutra Awards. He has worked as a director for music videos, among them for Ingrid St-Pierre, Émile Bilodeau and Dear Criminals.

His next feature documentary film Mother Saigon won the Colin Low Award for best Canadian documentary at the DOXA Documentary Film Festival in 2023.

Lê identifies as queer.

== Filmography ==
- 2008: Lan et Léa
- 2010: Je m'appelle Denis Gagnon
- 2010: Anna
- 2011: Nuits Nouvelles
- 2013: Grandma (Bà nôi)
- 2023: Mother Saigon (Má sài gòn)
