= Line Sander Egede =

Danish-Canadian film producer

Line Sander Egede is a Danish-Canadian film producer, associated with the Montreal-based film studio Art & Essai. She is most noted as a producer of Humanist Vampire Seeking Consenting Suicidal Person (Vampire humaniste cherche suicidaire consentant), which was a Canadian Screen Award nominee for Best Picture at the 12th Canadian Screen Awards in 2024.

She was previously a producer of the short documentary film Babushka, which was a Prix Iris nominee for Best Short Documentary at the 24th Quebec Cinema Awards in 2022, and the feature documentary Gabor, which was a Prix Iris nominee for Best Documentary Film at the 25th Quebec Cinema Awards in 2023.
