= Ariel Méthot =

Ariel Méthot, sometimes credited as Ariel Méthot-Bellemare, is a Canadian cinematographer from Quebec. He is most noted for his work on the documentary film Dehors Serge dehors, for which he received a Prix Iris nomination for Best Cinematography in a Documentary at the 24th Quebec Cinema Awards in 2022.

His other credits have included the films Tadoussac, Lunar-Orbit Rendezvous, My Boy (Mon Boy), Fabulous (Fabuleuses), Goodbye Golovin, Like a House on Fire, Days of Happiness (Les Jours heureux), Simon and Marianne (Simon et Marianne), You Are Not Alone (Vous n'êtes pas seuls), Out Standing (Seule au front), The Furies (Les Furies) and Elsewhere at Night (Ailleurs la nuit).
