= Mother Saigon =

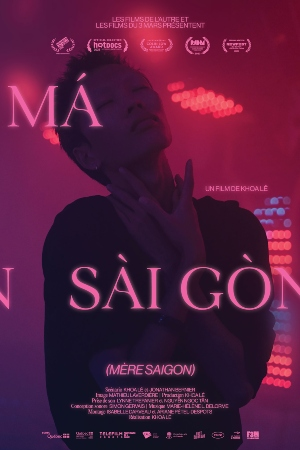
- Vietnamese: Má Sài Gòn
- Directed by: Khoa Lê
- Written by: Khoa Lê
- Produced by: Jonathan Bernier; Khoa Lê
- Cinematography: Mathieu Laverdière
- Edited by: Isabelle Darveau; Khoa Lê; Ariane Pétel-Despots
- Music by: Marie-Hélène Delorme
- Production company: Les Films de l'Autre
- Distributed by: Les Films du 3 Mars
- Release date: April 22, 2023 (Visions du Réel)
- Running time: 100 minutes
- Country: Canada
- Language: Vietnamese

Mother Saigon (Vietnamese: Má Sài Gòn) is a Canadian documentary film, directed by Khoa Lê and released in 2023. The film is a portrait of the LGBTQ community in Ho Chi Minh City, Vietnam.

== Release ==
The film premiered at the Visions du Réel documentary film festival in Nyon, Switzerland in April 2023, and had its Canadian premiere in May at the Hot Docs Canadian International Documentary Festival.

The film was the winner of the Colin Low Award at the 2023 DOXA Documentary Film Festival.

Mathieu Laverdière won the Prix Iris for Best Cinematography in a Documentary at the 26th Quebec Cinema Awards in 2024.
