= Prix Iris for Best Cinematography in a Documentary =

Annual Canadian film award

The Prix Iris for Best Cinematography in a Documentary (French: Prix Iris de la meilleure direction de la photographie d'un long métrage documentaire) is an annual film award, presented by Québec Cinéma as part of its Prix Iris awards program, to honour the year's best cinematography in documentary films made within the Cinema of Quebec.

The award was presented for the first time at the 19th Quebec Cinema Awards in 2017.

Étienne Roussy is the most nominated and awarded cinematographer in this category, having received four nominations and two awards.

With his win for Mother Saigon (Má Sài Gòn), Mathieu Laverdière became the first cinematographer to receive an award for Best Cinematography in a Documentary and Best Cinematography, having previously won for Underground (Souterrain).

== 2010s ==
Year	Cinematographer	Film	Ref
2017; 19th Quebec Cinema Awards
2017; 19th Quebec Cinema Awards	Étienne Roussy	Gulîstan, Land of Roses (Gulîstan, terre de roses)	
2017; 19th Quebec Cinema Awards	Jérémie Battaglia	Perfect (Parfaites)	
2017; 19th Quebec Cinema Awards	John Price	I Am the Blues	
2017; 19th Quebec Cinema Awards	Sébastien Rist, Aude Leroux-Lévesque	Living With Giants (Chez les géants)	
2017; 19th Quebec Cinema Awards	Olivier Tétreault	Manor (Manoir)	
2018; 20th Quebec Cinema Awards
2018; 20th Quebec Cinema Awards	François Messier-Rheault	A Skin So Soft (Ta peau si lisse)	
2018; 20th Quebec Cinema Awards	Benoit Aquin, Mathieu Roy	The Dispossessed (Les dépossédés)	
2018; 20th Quebec Cinema Awards	Samuel de Chavigny	Far Away Lands (Les terres lointaines)	
2018; 20th Quebec Cinema Awards	François Jacob, Vuk Stojanovic, Ilya Zima	A Moon of Nickel and Ice (Sur la lune de nickel)	
2018; 20th Quebec Cinema Awards	Étienne Roussy	Destierros	
2019; 21st Quebec Cinema Awards
2019; 21st Quebec Cinema Awards	Danae Elon, Itamar Mendes Flohr	A Sister's Song	
2019; 21st Quebec Cinema Awards	Benjamín Echazarreta	Cielo	
2019; 21st Quebec Cinema Awards	Sylvestre Guidi	New Memories	
2019; 21st Quebec Cinema Awards	Alexandre Lampron	Des histoires inventées	
2019; 21st Quebec Cinema Awards	Matthieu Rytz	Anote's Ark	

== 2020s ==
Year	Cinematographer	Film	Ref
2020; 22nd Quebec Cinema Awards
2020; 22nd Quebec Cinema Awards	Pedro Pires	Alexander Odyssey (Alexandre le fou)	
2020; 22nd Quebec Cinema Awards	Dominic Dorval, Vincent Masse, Thomas Rinfret, Richard Tremblay	Mad Dog and the Butcher (Les Derniers vilains)	
2020; 22nd Quebec Cinema Awards	Sami Mermer	Xalko	
2020; 22nd Quebec Cinema Awards	François Messier-Rheault, Ernesto Pardo	Dark Suns (Soleils noirs)	
2020; 22nd Quebec Cinema Awards	Pedro Ruiz	Havana, from on High (Sur les toits Havane)	
2021; 23rd Quebec Cinema Awards
2021; 23rd Quebec Cinema Awards	Olivier Higgins, Renaud Philippe	Wandering: A Rohingya Story (Errance sans retour)	
2021; 23rd Quebec Cinema Awards	Sarah Baril Gaudet	Passage	
2021; 23rd Quebec Cinema Awards	Hugo Gendron, Michel Valiquette	Call Me Human (Je m’appelle humain)	
2021; 23rd Quebec Cinema Awards	Mathieu Perrault Lapierre	The 108 Journey	
2021; 23rd Quebec Cinema Awards	Marianne Ploska	Prayer for a Lost Mitten (Prière pour une mitaine perdue)	
2022; 24th Quebec Cinema Awards
2022; 24th Quebec Cinema Awards	Tobie Marier Robitaille, Josée Deshaies	Big Giant Wave (Comme une vague)	
2022; 24th Quebec Cinema Awards	David Nadeau-Bernatchez, Sammy Baloji, Kiripi Katembo Siku	Rumba Rules, New Genealogies (Rumba Rules, nouvelles généalogies)	
2022; 24th Quebec Cinema Awards	Ariel Méthot	Dehors Serge dehors	
2022; 24th Quebec Cinema Awards	Léna Mill-Reuillard	Sisterhood (Ainsi soient-elles)	
2022; 24th Quebec Cinema Awards	Claire Sanford, Sam Trudelle	Fanny: The Right to Rock	
2023; 25th Quebec Cinema Awards
2023; 25th Quebec Cinema Awards	Jacquelyn Mills	Geographies of Solitude	
2023; 25th Quebec Cinema Awards	Geoffroy Beauchemin	Humus	
2023; 25th Quebec Cinema Awards	Nicolas Canniccioni, Arshia Shakiba	Rojek	
2023; 25th Quebec Cinema Awards	Joannie Lafrenière	Gabor	
2023; 25th Quebec Cinema Awards	Maude Plante-Husaruk	Far Beyond the Pasturelands (Au-delà des hautes vallées)	
2024; 26th Quebec Cinema Awards
2024; 26th Quebec Cinema Awards	Mathieu Laverdière	Mother Saigon (Má Sài Gòn)	
2024; 26th Quebec Cinema Awards	Philippe Lavalette	After the Odyssey (Au lendemain de l'odyssée)	
2024; 26th Quebec Cinema Awards	Kaveh Nabatian	Kite Zo A: Leave the Bones (Kite Zo A: Laisse les os)	
2024; 26th Quebec Cinema Awards	Ernesto Pardo, François Messier-Rheault	The White Guard (La Garde blanche)	
2024; 26th Quebec Cinema Awards	Louis Turcotte	Scratches of Life: The Art of Pierre Hébert (Graver l'homme: arrêt sur Pierre Hébert)	
2025; 27th Quebec Cinema Awards
2025; 27th Quebec Cinema Awards	Glauco Bermudez, Étienne Roussy	Ghosts of the Sea (Les enfants du large)	
2025; 27th Quebec Cinema Awards	Hanna Abu Saada	I Shall Not Hate	
2025; 27th Quebec Cinema Awards	Sébastien Blais	Okurimono	
2025; 27th Quebec Cinema Awards	Christian Mathieu Fournier	Waiting for Casimir (En attendant Casimir)	
2025; 27th Quebec Cinema Awards	Étienne Roussy	Among Mountains and Streams (Parmi les montagnes et les ruisseaux)	

== Multiple wins and nominations ==
=== Multiple wins ===
Wins	Cinematographer
2	Étienne Roussy

=== Three or more nominations ===
Nominations	Cinematographer
4	Étienne Roussy
3	François Messier-Rheault

== Combined totals for Best Cinematography and Best Cinematography in a Documentary ==
=== Multiple wins ===
Wins	Cinematographer
7	André Turpin
3	Pierre Mignot
3	Sara Mishara
2	Yves Bélanger
2	Nicolas Bolduc
2	Alain Dostie
2	Pierre Gill
2	Mathieu Laverdière

=== Three or more nominations ===
Nominations	Cinematographer
13	André Turpin
10	Sara Mishara
8	Steve Asselin
6	Nicolas Bolduc
6	Mathieu Laverdière
5	Pierre Gill
5	Michel La Veaux
4	Yves Bélanger
4	Bernard Couture
4	Josée Deshaies
4	Daniel Jobin
4	François Messier-Rheault
4	Pierre Mignot
4	Étienne Roussy
3	Nicolas Canniccioni
3	Alain Dostie
3	Guy Dufaux
3	Nathalie Moliavko-Visotzky
3	Ronald Plante
3	Tobie Marier Robitaille

== See also ==
- Canadian Screen Award for Best Cinematography in a Documentary
