= Sammy Baloji =

Artist from Democratic Republic of the Congo (born 1978)

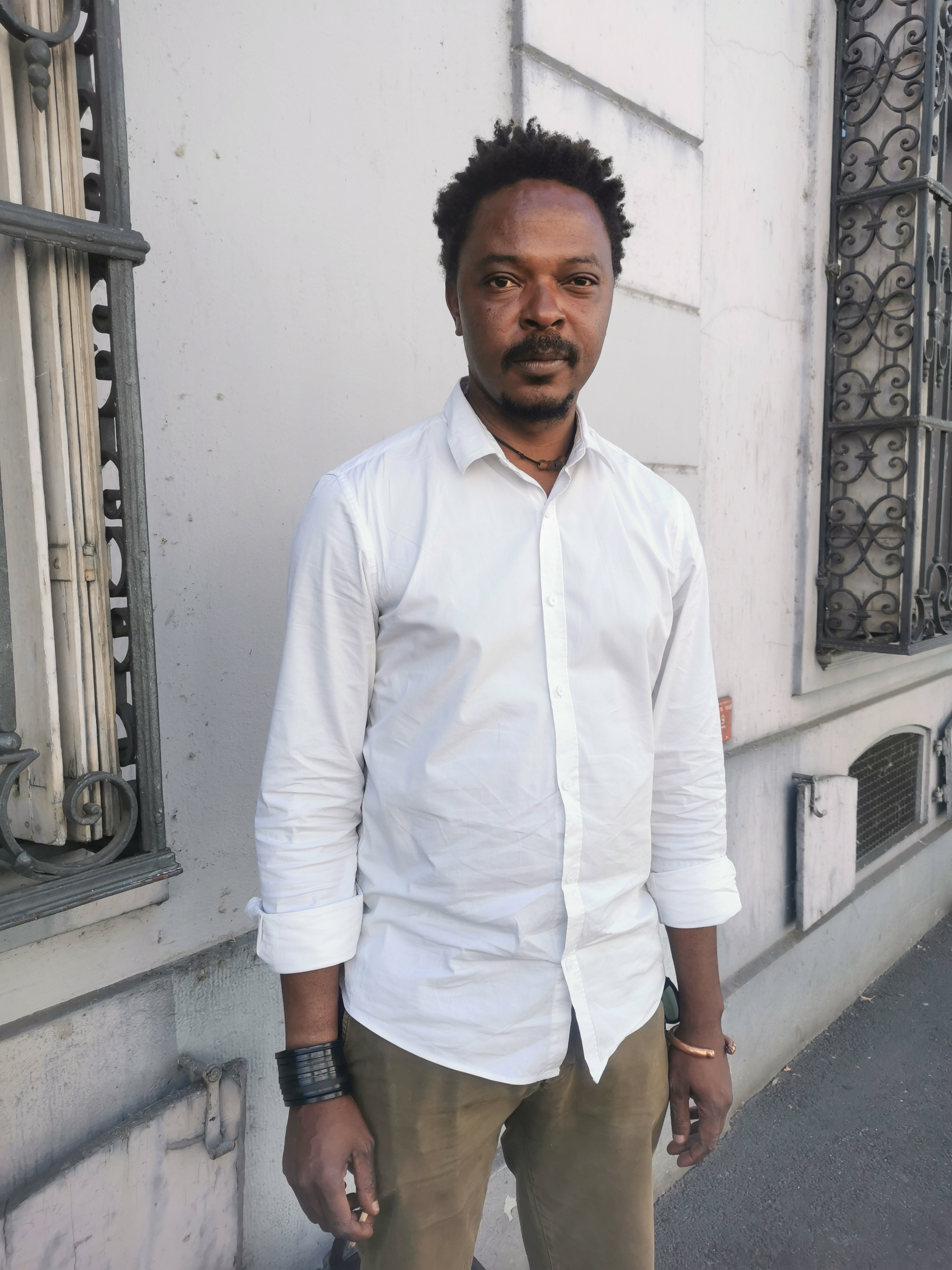
- Born: 29 December 1978 (age 46); Lubumbashi
- Occupation(s): Photographer, Performing artist, Film director

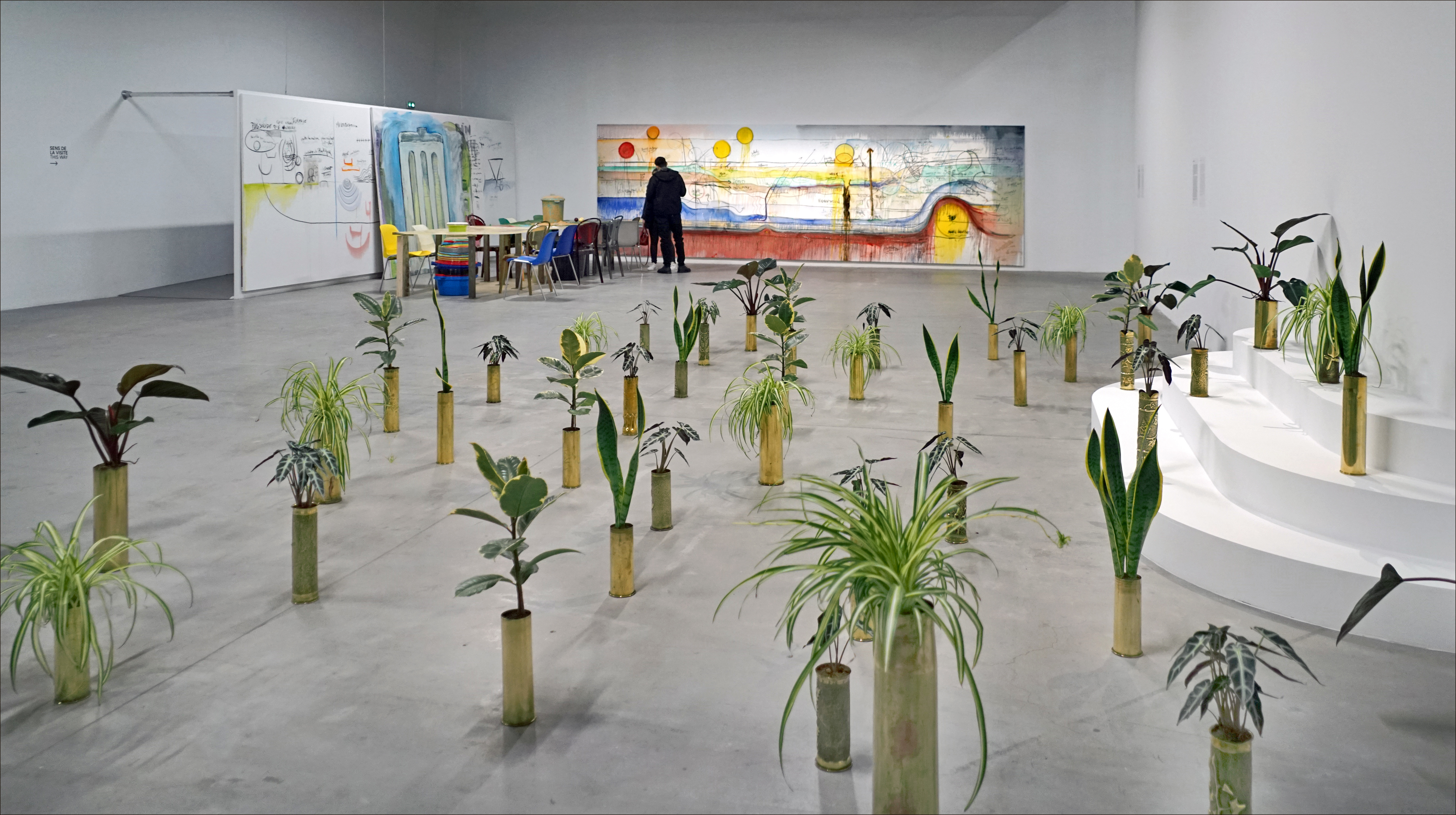
Installation by Sammy Baloji (Palais de Tokyo, Paris)

Sammy Baloji (born 1978) is a photographer from the Democratic Republic of the Congo. He works in Lubumbashi and Brussels, and held exhibitions in Amsterdam, Paris, Brussels, Bilbao, Cape Town and Bamako.

== Biography ==
Baloji was born in Lubumbashi on December 29, 1978. He graduated in literature and human science at the University of Lubumbashi.

After his study he first began to work as a cartoonist. He later specialized in video art and photography. He made much of his work in his own province of Katanga. Recurrent in his work are ethnographic exploitation, architecture and urbanism, such as the exploitation of man and environment in the Congolese urban landscape.

When the artist was younger, he and his family were in the midst of the growing poverty that followed the ending control of Belgium over the Katanga province. His father, Célestin Baloji, lost both his job and house as a result to this. During a day in 1998, when Baloji was leaving school, he was given a camera by his brother-in-law. He was later given a Canon camera from his aunt in 2003. After obtaining his first camera, Baloji had trained under photographer, Simon Mukundayi.

The artist also cofounded the biennale at Lubumbashi with Gulda el Magambo Bin Ali in 2008, with the intention of art being more accessible within the area, as there were little resources for it at the time.

== Theme and works ==
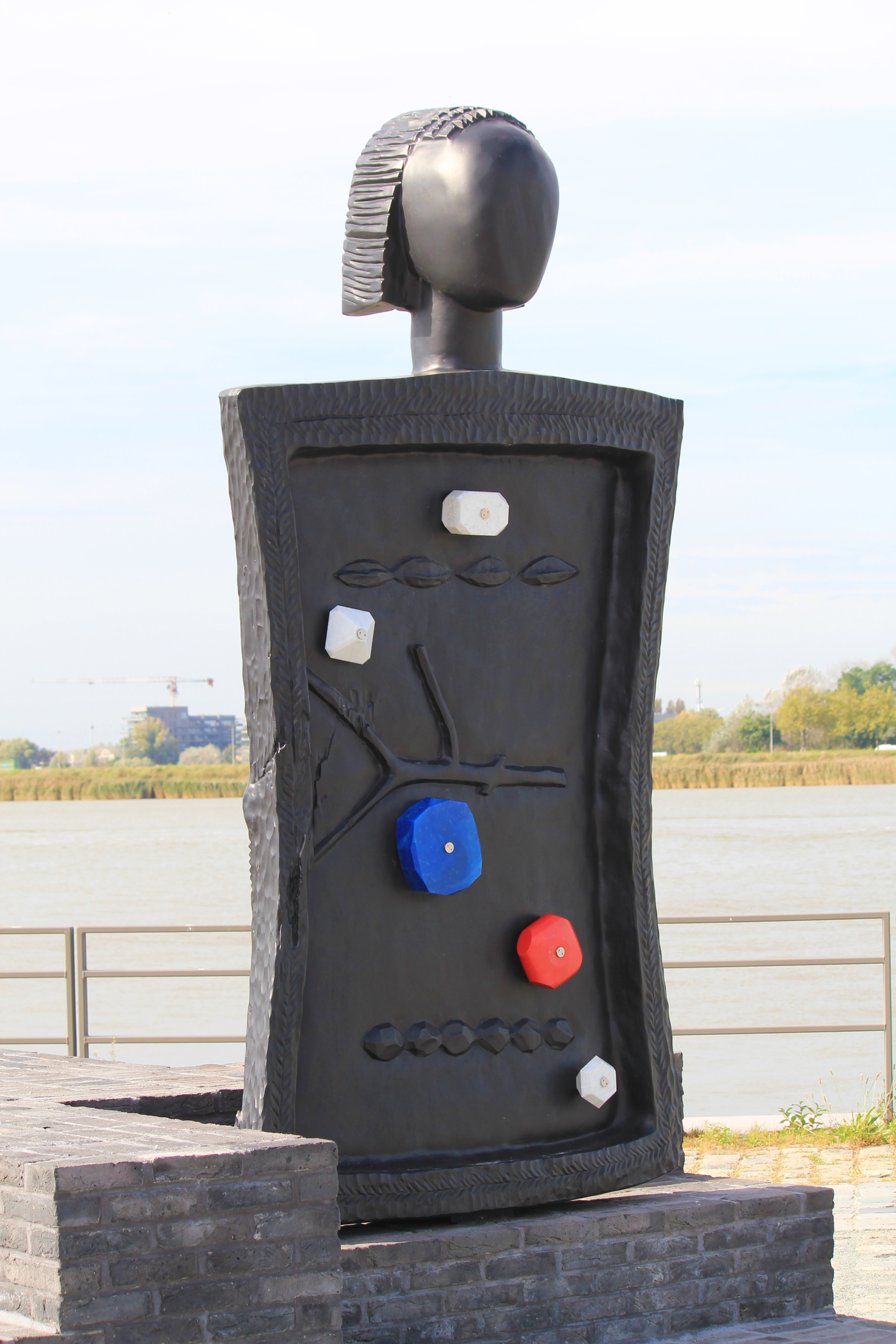
The Long Hand (bronze sculpture based on a lukasa in Antwerp, Belgium)

Baloji is commonly known for his photographic works, which usually pertains to Lubumbashi's 20th century history, including Mémoire, The Album, and his Kolwezi series.

The theme within most of Baloji's works is in relation to Lubumbashi's colonized history, which was initially controlled by Belgium. This includes the time where the Belgium king, Leopold II, was in possession of the Congolese people in the province, but they were eventually passed off to the Union Minière du Haut-Katanga. The union started to control the Congolese people into forced mining labor in 1911. The land that held Lubumbashi was rich in valuable materials, with the most abundant source being copper, something that can be seen in Baloji's sculpture work.

Photographic Essay on Urban Planning was also a collection of photographs created by the artist himself. The series contained twelve images within a grid, depicting half as aerial images of Lubumbashi and the other six filled with flies and mosquitoes. This was in relation to the forced division by the Belgian colonizers on the Congolese people, under the disguise it was meant to separate the people from the malaria holding insects.

Baloji also has works in sculpture. The two copper sculptures, Sociétés Secrètes and The Other Memorial were similar pieces that both depicted the texture of scarification, which were in reference to the artist's culture. Sociétés Secrètes contained eight bas-reliefs, which are all unique to one another due to the varying scarification patterns. The Other Memorial is dome shaped and also contains the patterns of scarification, but its historical meaning this time reflects certain instances that happened during World War I.

Baloji and David Nadeau-Bernatchez co-directed the 2020 documentary film Rumba Rules, New Genealogies (Rumba Rules, nouvelles généalogies), about the music scene of Kinshasa.

== Mémoire ==
Mémoire is a series of images composed by Baloji himself, sharing the historical events of Lubumbashi during its colonization in the 20th century. The artist uses black-and-white archival photos of the Congolese people and crops them out onto a colored, contemporary background of mine sites they were forced to work on. Baloji does these compositions and edits in Photoshop. Multiple images within the series portrays the vulnerability and uneasiness of the figures presented on each of the photographs.

The series was also done in a video adaption format, for Baloji's first use in time-based media. This over fourteen-minute video still follows the lines of the original photo series’ meaning, but is now presented by the dancing performance of Congolese choreographer, Faustin Linyekula.

== Exhibitions ==
Solo shows

- 2009 Katanga – Schatten der Vergangenheit – Deutsches Filmmuseum, Frankfurt/Main
- 2010 Mémoire – Goethe-Institut Nairobi, Nairobi Mémoire by Sammy Baloji – CGP London – Cafe Gallery Projects, London
- 2018 A Blueprint for Toads and Snakes – Framer Framed – Amsterdam – The Netherlands

Group shows

- 2007 TRANS CAPE – contemporary African art on the move – Trans Cape Africa, Cape Town
- 2007 Congo Contemporain – Monos Gallery, Liège
- 2008 The Messenger – Cultuurcentrum Brugge, Bruges
- 2008 Spot on...- ifa-Galerie Berlin, Berlin
- 2008 InVideo: Lands And Skies – Spazio Oberdan, Milan
- 2009 Spot On... Bamako – Vii. Rencontres Africaines de la Photographie – ifa-Galerie Stuttgart, Stuttgart
- 2009 Périfériks – CAN – Centre d'Art Neuchâtel, Neuchâtel
- 2010 Muestra Annual Xxiii Mam ChiloÉ – MAM – Museo de Arte Moderno Chiloé, Castro
- 2010 Prix Pictet / Earth – Gallery of Photography, Dublin
- 2011 Possible Cities: Africa In Photography and Video – Cantor Fitzgerald Gallery (CFG) – Haverford College, Haverford, PA
- 2011 ARS 11 – Kiasma – Museum of Contemporary Art, Helsinki
- 2011 Meeting Points 6 – Locus Agonistes: Practices and Logics of the Civic – Beirut Art Center, Beirut
- 2011 Artists in Residence. Sammy Baloji & Patrick Mudekereza – Royal Museum for Central Africa, Tervuren
- 2011 Present Tense – Gulbenkian. Próximo Futuro, Lisbon
- 2011 Project 35 – Gertrude contemporary art spaces, Melbourne, VIC
- 2011 Level 2 Gallery: Contested Terrains – Tate Modern, London
- 2011 Infinite Balance: Artists and the Environment – The Museum of Photographic Arts, San Diego, CA
- 2012 The Beautiful Time – Museum of African Art in the Natural History Museum – New York City
- 2012 Environment and Object – Recent African Art – Middlebury College Museum of Art, Middlebury, VT
- 2012 Project 35 – Kunsthaus CentrePasquArt – Centre d'Art, Biel/Bienne
- 2012 All That Fits: The Aesthetics of Journalism – QUAD Gallery, Derby
- 2012 Status 24 – Dokumente Von Heute – Fotomuseum Winterthur, Winterthur
- 2012 Le surréel Congo – Museum für Kunst und Kulturgeschichte Dortmund, Dortmund
- 2012 Newtopia – Cultuurcentrum Mechelen, Mechelen
- 2013 No Limit 2, Une Œuvre / Un Artiste – Galerie Imane Farès, Paris
- 2013 Earth Matters: Land as Material and Metaphor in the Arts of Africa – National Museum of African Art – Smithsonian Institution, Washington, DC
- 2013 Witness/Témoin – Espace doual´art, Douala
- 2013 La Otra Bienal De Arte 2013 – La Otra Bienal, Bogota
- 2013 Conversation Piece – Mu.ZEE, Oostende
- 2014 Die Göttliche Komödie. Himmel, Hölle, Fegefeuer aus Sicht afrikanischer Gegenwartskünstler, The Divine Comedy. Heaven, Purgatory and Hell Revisited by Contemporary African Artists – Museum für Moderne Kunst (MMK), Frankfurt/Main
- 2014 Earth Matters: Land as Material and Metaphor in the Arts of Africa – Fowler Museum at UCLA, Los Angeles, CA
- 2014 Present Tense – Centro de Arte Moderna – CAM – Fundação Calouste Gulbenkian, Lisbon
- 2020 Radical Revisionists: Contemporary African Artists Confronting Past and Present, Moody Center for the Arts, Houston, Texas

== Awards ==
In 2007 Baloji was twice awarded at the African Photography Encounters in Bamako, Mali, with the Prize Africa in Creation (Prix Afrique en Creation) and the Prize for the Image (Prix pour l’image). In 2009 he was honored with a Prince Claus Award from the Netherlands, for "his highly original inscription of the painful history of human and environmental exploitation into the present-day landscape, for bringing Congo's current realities to an international platform, for his important contribution to the memory of the Congo providing a new reading of the present, and for his challenging demonstration that development can only be realized after duly taking into account the traumas of the past."

He received two Prix Iris nominations for Rumba Rules, New Genealogies at the 24th Quebec Cinema Awards in 2022, for Best Documentary Film and Best Cinematography in a Documentary.
