= Tobie Marier Robitaille =

Canadian cinematographer

Tobie Marier Robitaille is a Canadian cinematographer. He is most noted for the documentary film Big Giant Wave (Comme une vague), for which he and Josée Deshaies won the Prix Iris for Best Cinematography in a Documentary at the 24th Quebec Cinema Awards in 2022.

He has also received two prior Prix Iris nominationms for Best Cinematography, at the 19th Quebec Cinema Awards in 2017 for Nitro Rush and at the 23rd Quebec Cinema Awards in 2021 for Night of the Kings (La nuit des rois). Alongside Nicolas Bolduc, Erik Ljung, Van Royko, Sara Mishara, Alexia Toman and André Turpin, he won a Gémeaux Award for Best Photography in a Documentary or Public Affairs program in 2024 for Lac-Mégantic: This Is Not an Accident (Lac-Mégantic : ceci n’est pas un accident).

His other credits have included the films Origami, Major Junior (Junior Majeur), Threesome (Le trip à trois) and Our Own (Les Nôtres).
