= Baggage (film) =

2017 film by Paul Tom

- French: Bagages
- Directed by: Paul Tom
- Written by: Paul Tom; Mélissa Lefebvre
- Produced by: Karine Dubois
- Cinematography: Paul Tom
- Edited by: Alain Loiselle; Paul Tom
- Music by: Vincent Lefebvre
- Production company: Picbois Productions
- Release date: September 16, 2017 (FCVQ)
- Running time: 54 minutes
- Country: Canada
- Language: French

Baggage (French: Bagages) is a Canadian documentary film, directed by Paul Tom and released in 2017. The film centres on a group of immigrant students enrolled in a theatre program.

The film won several awards on the film festival circuit, including the prix Télébec for best mid-length film at the 2017 Abitibi-Témiscamingue International Film Festival, the Prix Public for Best Canadian Film at the 2017 Quebec City Film Festival, and the Women Inmate Jury Award at the 2017 Montreal International Documentary Festival.

Following its television broadcast on Télé-Québec in December 2017, it won two Gémeaux Awards in 2018, for Best Documentary Program or Series (Arts and Culture) and Best Direction in a Documentary (Biography, Arts and Culture, Nature, Science or Environment). It was also nominated for Best Writing in a Documentary.
