= Simon and Marianne =

- French: Simon et Marianne
- Directed by: Pier-Luc Latulippe; Martin Fournier
- Produced by: Pier-Luc Latulippe; Martin Fournier
- Starring: Simon Roy; Marianne Marquis-Gravel
- Cinematography: Ariel Méthot
- Edited by: Jean-François Lord
- Music by: Demain Déluge
- Release date: June 14, 2024 (Sheffield)
- Running time: 71 minutes
- Country: Canada
- Language: French

Simon and Marianne (French: Simon et Marianne) is a Canadian documentary film, directed by Pier-Luc Latulippe and Martin Fournier and released in 2024. The film centres on author Simon Roy and his wife, Marianne Marquis-Gravel, as they go through Roy's final months after being diagnosed with incurable terminal brain cancer.

The film premiered in June 2024 at the Sheffield DocFest in the United Kingdom, and had its Canadian premiere at the Montreal International Documentary Festival.

== Awards ==
The film won the Flinders University International Documentary Award at the 2024 Adelaide Film Festival.

The film was shortlisted for the 2025 Prix collégial du cinéma québécois.
