= Dehors Serge dehors =

2021 film by Martin Fournier and Pier-Luc Latulippe

- Directed by: Martin Fournier; Pier-Luc Latulippe
- Written by: Martin Fournier; Pier-Luc Latulippe
- Produced by: Martin Fournier
- Cinematography: Ariel Méthot
- Edited by: Jean-François Lord
- Music by: Les Trois Accords
- Production company: Cheval Films
- Release date: November 13, 2021 (RIDM)
- Running time: 68 minutes
- Country: Canada
- Language: French

Dehors Serge dehors (Lit. "Outside, Serge, Outside") is a Canadian documentary film, directed by Martin Fournier and Pier-Luc Latulippe and released in 2021. The film is a portrait of actor and comedian Serge Thériault, who has in recent years suffered from intense clinical depression and has barely left his home, as his friends and family try to lovingly guide him back out into the world.

The film premiered in November 2021 at the Montreal International Documentary Festival.

The film received three Prix Iris nominations at the 24th Quebec Cinema Awards in 2022, for Best Documentary Film, Best Cinematography in a Documentary (Ariel Méthot) and Best Editing in a Documentary (Jean-François Lord).
