= How to Fix Radios =

- Directed by: Casper Leonard; Emily Russell
- Written by: Casper Leonard; Emily Russell
- Starring: James Rudden; Dimitri Watson; Willa Crowder; Hector Jenkins
- Cinematography: Emily Russell
- Edited by: Casper Leonard
- Music by: Hector Jenkins
- Release date: March 5, 2021 (KCFF)
- Running time: 91 minutes
- Country: Canada
- Language: English

How to Fix Radios is a Canadian drama film, directed by Emily Russell and Casper Leonard and released in 2021. The film centres on the friendship between Evan (James Rudden), a shy and isolated teenager in small town Ontario whose worldview is challenged when he takes a summer job at a bait shop where his supervisor is the more assertive and openly gay Ross (Dimitri Watson).

The film premiered on March 5, 2021, at the Kingston Canadian Film Festival, and was subsequently screened in May at the Inside Out Film and Video Festival.
