= Alisi Telengut =

Canadian artist and animator

Alisi Telengut is a Canadian artist and animator, most noted for her short films The Fourfold and The Displeasure (La Grogne).

The Fourfold was a Canadian Screen Award nominee for Best Animated Short at the 9th Canadian Screen Awards and a Prix Iris nominee for Best Animated Short Film at the 23rd Quebec Cinema Awards, and La Grogne won the Prix Iris for Best Animated Short Film at the 24th Quebec Cinema Awards in 2022.

She previously created the short films Melancholy Days (2011), Tengri (2012), Tears of Inge (2013) and Nutag-Homeland (2016).

Nutag-Homeland was selected by Telefilm Canada for inclusion in the Canada: Not Short on Talent short film showcase at the 2016 Marché du Film, and Telengut was profiled in a 2017 episode of the CBC Television arts documentary series Exhibitionists.
