= Bonfires (film) =

- Directed by: Martin Bureau
- Produced by: Catherine Benoit
- Cinematography: Émile Bureau; Martin Bureau
- Edited by: Émile Bureau; Martin Bureau
- Music by: Érick D'Orion
- Distributed by: Spira
- Release date: 2017
- Running time: 6 minutes
- Country: Canada

Bonfires is a Canadian short documentary film, directed by Martin Bureau and released in 2017. The film depicts the controversial Eleventh Night celebrations in Northern Ireland, when Ulster Protestants continue to light large bonfires each year to commemorate the Protestant victory over Catholics in the Battle of the Boyne.

The film premiered at the Traces de vies documentary film festival in Clermont-Ferrand in 2017. It was screened at a number of film festivals thereafter, and was incorporated into Bureau's larger multimedia exhibition Les murs du désordre.

== Awards ==
In 2018, the film won the Prix Farel for best short film at the Festival international du film à thématique religieuse in Neufchâtel, Switzerland. In 2019, the film received a Canadian Screen Award nomination for Best Short Documentary at the 7th Canadian Screen Awards.
