= Babushka (film) =

2021 Canadian short documentary film

- Directed by: Kristina Wagenbauer
- Written by: Kristina Wagenbauer
- Produced by: Line Sander Egede
- Starring: Kristina Wagenbauer; Valentina Nikolaevna Krasiuk
- Cinematography: Kristina Wagenbauer
- Edited by: Xi Feng
- Music by: Jean-Sébastien Williams
- Production company: TAK Films
- Distributed by: Spira
- Release date: November 18, 2021 (RIDM)
- Running time: 25 minutes
- Country: Canada
- Language: Russian

Babushka is a Canadian short documentary film, directed by Kristina Wagenbauer and released in 2021. The film documents Wagenbauer's trip to Russia to visit her maternal grandmother, Valentina Nikolaevna Krasiuk, whom she has not seen in person in 25 years.

The film premiered in November 2021 at the Montreal International Documentary Festival.

The film was a Canadian Screen Award nominee for Best Short Documentary at the 10th Canadian Screen Awards, and a Prix Iris nominee for Best Short Documentary at the 24th Quebec Cinema Awards.
