= The Displeasure =

2021 film by Alisi Telengut

- French: La Grogne
- Directed by: Alisi Telengut
- Written by: Dominque Dussault; Alisi Telengut
- Produced by: Dominique Dussault; Alisi Telengut
- Cinematography: Stéphanie Weber Biron
- Edited by: Alisi Telengut
- Music by: Peter Venne
- Animation by: Alisi Telengut; Laura Venditti
- Distributed by: Travelling Distribution
- Release date: October 16, 2021 (FNC)
- Running time: 10 minutes
- Country: Canada

The Displeasure (French: La Grogne) is a Canadian animated short film, directed by Alisi Telengut and released in 2021. A fantastical fable, the film centres on a battle of wills between a young girl and the family dog for the attention of the girl's father.

The film premiered in October 2021 at the 2021 Festival du nouveau cinéma.

The film won the Prix Iris for Best Animated Short Film at the 24th Quebec Cinema Awards in 2022.
