= Heirdoms =

2021 film by Emmanuel Tardif

- Theatrical release poster
- French: Soumissions
- Directed by: Emmanuel Tardif
- Written by: Emmanuel Tardif
- Produced by: Emmanuel Tardif
- Starring: Martin Dubreuil; Charlotte Aubin
- Cinematography: François Herquel
- Edited by: Emmanuel Tardif
- Music by: Julien Racine
- Production company: Les Rapailleurs
- Distributed by: Les Films du 3 mars
- Release date: September 18, 2021 (Cinéfest)
- Running time: 70 minutes
- Country: Canada
- Language: French

Heirdoms (French: Soumissions) is a 2021 Canadian drama film, directed by Emmanuel Tardif. The film stars Martin Dubreuil as Joseph, a man whose wife Roxanne (Charlotte Aubin) has left him, and who is keeping their son Mathieu (Félix Grenier) sequestered at his home to prevent her from being in contact.

The film's cast also includes Léa Roy as a neighbour, and Lucette Chalifoux as a mediator who is trying to help Joseph and Roxanne resolve their disagreements.

The film premiered at the 2021 Cinéfest Sudbury International Film Festival on September 18, 2021, before going into commercial release on October 8.
