= Paul Tom =

Canadian documentary filmmaker

Paul Tom is a Canadian documentary filmmaker, most noted for his films Baggage (Bagages) and Alone (Seuls).

Born to Cambodian parents in a refugee camp in Thailand, Tom came to Canada with his family in childhood. He studied communications and media at the Université du Québec à Montréal, and animation at Concordia University, and created the short films Que je vive en paix in 2011 and Un pays de silences in 2013.

Baggage, his first mid-length documentary, was released in 2017, and centred on a group of immigrant students enrolled in a theatre program. The film won several awards on the film festival circuit, including the prix Télébec for best mid-length film at the 2017 Abitibi-Témiscamingue International Film Festival, the Prix Public for Best Canadian Film at the 2017 Quebec City Film Festival, and the Women Inmate Jury Award at the 2017 Montreal International Documentary Festival. Following its television broadcast on Télé-Québec in December 2017, it won two Gémeaux Awards in 2018, for Best Documentary Program or Series (Arts and Culture) and Best Direction in a Documentary (Biography, Arts and Culture, Nature, Science or Environment). It was also nominated for Best Writing in a Documentary.

His full-length documentary feature Alone was released in 2021, and was a Prix Iris nominee for Best Documentary Film at the 24th Quebec Cinema Awards in 2022. Tom and illustrator Mélanie Baillargé subsequently published a book adaptation of the film, under the French title Seuls in 2022 and the English title Alone: The Journey of Three Young Refugees in 2023. The French edition was a Governor General's Award nominee for French-language children's illustration at the 2022 Governor General's Awards, and the English translation by Arielle Aaronson was nominated for the Governor General's Award for French to English translation at the 2023 Governor General's Awards.
