= Manor (film) =

2015 Canadian documentary film

- French: Manoir
- Directed by: Martin Fournier; Pier-Luc Latulippe
- Written by: Martin Fournier; Pier-Luc Latulippe
- Produced by: Martin Fournier; Pier-Luc Latulippe
- Cinematography: Olivier Tétreault
- Edited by: Jean-François Lord
- Production company: Cheval Films
- Release date: November 20, 2015 (RIDM)
- Running time: 83 minutes
- Country: Canada
- Language: French

Manor (French: Manoir) is a Canadian documentary film, directed by Martin Fournier and Pier-Luc Latulippe and released in 2015. The film profiles the residents of Gaulin Manor, a onetime hotel in Saint-Hyacinthe, Quebec, which has been converted into a transitional housing facility for former psychiatric patients who remain at risk of homelessness, but is about to be closed and demolished for redevelopment.

The film premiered at the 2015 Montreal International Documentary Festival, before going into commercial release in 2016.

== Awards ==
At RIDM, the film received an honorable mention from the Magnus Isaccson Award jury.

The film won the Prix Iris for Best Documentary Film at the 19th Quebec Cinema Awards in 2017. It was also a nominee for Best Cinematography in a Documentary (Olivier Tétreault) and Best Editing in a Documentary (Jean-François Lord).

The film was the winner of the 2017 Prix collégial du cinéma québécois.
