= Gabor (2021 film) =

- Directed by: Joannie Lafrenière
- Written by: Joannie Lafrenière
- Produced by: Line Sander Egede
- Starring: Gabor Szilasi
- Cinematography: Joannie Lafrenière
- Edited by: Emmanuelle Lane
- Music by: Daniel "Gervaise" Baillargeon
- Production company: TAK Films
- Distributed by: Maison 4:3
- Release date: November 20, 2021 (RIDM)
- Running time: 101 minutes
- Country: Canada
- Language: French

Gabor is a Canadian documentary film, directed by Joannie Lafrenière and released in 2021. The film is a portrait of Hungarian-Canadian photographer Gabor Szilasi.

It premiered at the 2021 Montreal International Documentary Festival, before going into wider commercial release in 2022.

== Awards ==
Award	Date of ceremony	Category	Recipient(s)	Result	Ref.
Directors Guild of Canada	2023	Jean-Marc Vallée DGC Discovery Award	Joannie Lafrenière	Longlisted	
Prix Iris	December 10, 2023	Best Documentary	Joannie Lafrenière, Line Sander Egede	Nominated	
Prix Iris	December 10, 2023	Best Cinematography in a Documentary	Joannie Lafrenière	Nominated	
Prix Iris	December 10, 2023	Best Editing in a Documentary	Emmanuelle Lane	Nominated	
Prix Iris	December 10, 2023	Best Original Music in a Documentary	Daniel "Gervaise" Baillargeon	Won	
