= Alone (2021 film) =

2021 film by Paul Tom

- French: Seuls
- Directed by: Paul Tom
- Written by: Julie Boisvert; Mylène Péthel; Paul Tom
- Produced by: Marie-Pierre Corriveau; Karine Dubois
- Cinematography: Alex Margineanu; Paul Tom
- Edited by: Alain Loiselle
- Music by: Samuel Laflamme; Dominique Fils-Aimé
- Animation by: Brigitte Archambault
- Production company: Picbois Productions
- Release date: November 11, 2021 (FICFA)
- Running time: 82 minutes
- Country: Canada
- Languages: English; French

Alone (French: Seuls) is a 2021 Canadian documentary film, directed by Paul Tom. Blending live action with animated sequences, the film profiles Afshin, Alain and Patricia, three young adults who first moved to Canada as refugees, travelling alone without their families. It explores both the lingering effects of their formative experiences and the resilience that allowed them to build new lives in Canada, including Alain pursuing his dream of becoming a police officer and Patricia's appreciation of the fact that she can safely live as a bisexual woman in Canada, which she could not have done in her native Uganda.

The film premiered as the opening film of the Festival international du cinéma francophone en Acadie on November 11, 2021, before screening commercially in Quebec beginning November 12.

The film received two Prix Iris nominations at the 24th Quebec Cinema Awards in 2022, for Best Documentary Film and Best Original Music in a Documentary (Samuel Laflamme, Dominique Fils-Aimé).

Tom and illustrator Mélanie Baillargé subsequently published a book adaptation of the film, under the French title Seuls in 2022 and the English title Alone: The Journey of Three Young Refugees in 2023. The French edition was a Governor General's Award nominee for French-language children's illustration at the 2022 Governor General's Awards.
