= Pier-Luc Latulippe =

Canadian film director

Pier-Luc Latulippe is a Canadian film director from Quebec, most noted as codirector with Martin Fournier of the documentary films Manor (Manoir) and Dehors Serge dehors.

Manor won the Prix Iris for Best Documentary Film at the 19th Quebec Cinema Awards in 2017 and was the winner of the 2017 Prix collégial du cinéma québécois, while Dehors Serge dehors was a Prix Iris nominee for Best Documentary Film at the 24th Quebec Cinema Awards in 2022.

In 2024 they collaborated on Simon and Marianne (Simon et Marianne), their third film as a duo.

Separately from Fournier, Latulippe has also directed a number of short films, including Dernière étape avant le silence, Edges, River (Rives), The Taste of Vietnam (Le Goût du Vietnam) and On the Mountain (Sur la montagne).
