= Wochiigii lo: End of the Peace =

2021 Canadian documentary film

- Directed by: Heather Hatch
- Written by: Heather Hatch
- Produced by: Heather Hatch; Ava Karvonen
- Cinematography: Frederick Kroetsch
- Edited by: Brenda Terning
- Music by: Matthew Cardinal; Dwayne Martineau; John McMillan
- Production companies: Della and Goliath Productions
- Release date: September 12, 2021 (TIFF)
- Running time: 85 minutes
- Country: Canada
- Language: English

Wochiigii lo: End of the Peace is a Canadian documentary film, directed by Heather Hatch and released in 2021. The film centres on the West Moberly and Prophet River First Nations in British Columbia, and their fight against the Site C hydroelectric dam project.

The film premiered at the 2021 Toronto International Film Festival. Kelly Boutsalis of Point of View magazine positively reviewed the film, writing that "Haida director Hatch’s documentary is compelling and tells an important, and infuriating story of corporations and the government causing environmental destruction under the guise of bettering the economy, when it’s actually about political grandstanding. It also adds to the evidence of how First Nations people continue to be the stewards of the land, and how sometimes that brings them through the legal system, or to a protest site."
