= Marie-Julie Dallaire =

Canadian film director

Marie-Julie Dallaire is a Canadian film director from Quebec.

She is most noted as one of the directors of the 1996 anthology film Cosmos, which was Canada's submission for the Best Foreign Language Film Oscar at the 70th Academy Awards and a shortlisted Genie Award nominee for Best Motion Picture at the 18th Genie Awards, and the 2021 documentary film Big Giant Wave (Comme une vague), which won the Prix Iris for Best Documentary Film at the 24th Quebec Cinema Awards in 2022.

In 2022 she announced that she was entering production on Cut Print Thank You Bye, a documentary film about the life and career of Jean-Marc Vallée.
