= Martin Bureau =

Canadian multimedia artist from Quebec

Martin Bureau is a Canadian multimedia artist from Quebec. He is most noted for his exhibition Les murs du désordre, an exploration of the use of literal or metaphorical walls to enforce national, ethnic or religious divisions.

Bonfires, a short film which was screened at a number of film festivals before being incorporated into Les murs du désordre, won the Prix Farel for best short film at the Festival international du film à thématique religieuse in Neufchâtel, Switzerland and received a Canadian Screen Award nomination for Best Short Documentary at the 7th Canadian Screen Awards.
