= Kristina Wagenbauer =

Canadian film director and screenwriter

Kristina Wagenbauer is a Canadian film director and screenwriter based in Montreal, Quebec. She is most noted for her 2017 feature film Sashinka, for which she was a Prix Iris nominee for Best Casting at the 21st Quebec Cinema Awards in 2019, and her 2021 short film Babushka, which was a Canadian Screen Award nominee for Best Short Documentary at the 10th Canadian Screen Awards in 2022.

In 2018, she was one of eight women filmmakers selected for the Academy of Canadian Cinema and Television's Apprenticeship for Women Directors program, alongside Kathleen Hepburn, Tiffany Hsiung, Alicia K. Harris, Allison White, Asia Youngman, Halima Ouardiri, and Kirsten Carthew.
