= Martin Fournier (filmmaker) =

Canadian film director

Martin Fournier is a Canadian film director from Quebec, most noted as codirector with Pier-Luc Latulippe of the documentary films Manor (Manoir) and Dehors Serge dehors.

Manor won the Prix Iris for Best Documentary Film at the 19th Quebec Cinema Awards in 2017 and was the winner of the 2017 Prix collégial du cinéma québécois, while Dehors Serge dehors was a Prix Iris nominee for Best Documentary Film at the 24th Quebec Cinema Awards in 2022.

In 2024 they collaborated on Simon and Marianne (Simon et Marianne), their third film as a duo.

Separately from Latulippe, Fournier has also directed the short documentary film Robert Lepage: Tuned to a Different Frequency, Cœur de pirate's music video for "Pour un infidèle", and episodes of the documentary television series La vie nous arrive.
