= Bootlegger (2021 film) =

- Directed by: Caroline Monnet
- Written by: Caroline Monnet; Daniel Watchorn
- Produced by: Catherine Chagnon
- Starring: Kawennáhere Devery Jacobs; Pascale Bussières
- Cinematography: Nicolas Canniccioni
- Edited by: Aube Foglia
- Music by: Tanya Tagaq; Jean Martin
- Production company: Microclimat Films
- Distributed by: MK2 Mile End
- Release date: September 25, 2021 (Cinefest)
- Running time: 81 minutes
- Country: Canada
- Languages: French; Anishinabemowin

Bootlegger is a Canadian drama film, directed by Caroline Monnet and released in September 2021. The film centres on Mani (Kawennáhere Devery Jacobs), an indigenous graduate student in university who returns to her reserve in Quebec to advocate for a community referendum banning the sale of alcohol, placing her at odds with Laura (Pascale Bussières), a bootlegger who profits from the sale of alcohol in the community.

The cast also includes Brigitte Poupart, Jacob Whiteduck-Lavoie, Joshua Odjick, Jacques Newashish, Dominique Pétin and Samian.

The film was shot in fall 2019 in Kitigan Zibi, Quebec. Prior to its production, the film's screenplay won the Cinéfondation bursary for Best Screenplay at the 2017 Cannes Film Festival.

The film premiered at the 2021 Cinéfest Sudbury International Film Festival, and screened as the opening film of the 2021 Festival du nouveau cinéma, in advance of its commercial premiere on October 15.

== Awards ==
Monnet was named the winner of the juried award for Emerging Canadian Director at the 2021 Vancouver International Film Festival. The film was a nominee for the DGC Discovery Award at the 2021 Directors Guild of Canada awards.

Tanya Tagaq and Jean Martin received a Canadian Screen Award nomination for Best Original Song at the 10th Canadian Screen Awards in 2022, for "Surface Nord".
