= Big Giant Wave =

2021 Canadian documentary film

- French: Comme une vague
- Directed by: Marie-Julie Dallaire
- Written by: Andrée Blais; Marie-Julie Dallaire
- Produced by: Marie-Julie Dallaire; Nathan Ross; Alex Sliman; Jean-Marc Vallée
- Starring: Patrick Watson; Stéphane Tétreault; Osunlade
- Cinematography: Josée Deshaies; Tobie Marier Robitaille
- Edited by: Louis-Martin Paradis
- Production company: Griffinpark Films
- Distributed by: Les Films Séville
- Release date: March 19, 2021 (IFFA)
- Running time: 88 minutes
- Country: Canada
- Languages: English; French

Big Giant Wave (French: Comme une vague, lit. "Like a Wave") is a Canadian documentary film, directed by Marie-Julie Dallaire and released in 2021. The film is an homage to the power and influence of music, exploring the topic both through performance clips and interviews with various figures including singer-songwriter Patrick Watson, classical violinist Stéphane Tétreault and DJ Osunlade.

The film premiered on March 19, 2021, at the International Festival of Films on Art in Montreal, before being released commercially on April 2 in both English and French versions.

== Awards ==
Award	Date of ceremony	Category	Recipient(s) and nominee(s)	Result	Ref(s)
Prix Iris	June 5, 2022	Best Documentary Film	Marie-Julie Dallaire, Andrée Blais, Alex Sliman	Won	
Prix Iris	June 5, 2022	Best Cinematography in a Documentary	Josée Deshaies, Tobie Marier Robitaille	Won	
Prix Iris	June 5, 2022	Best Editing in a Documentary	Louis-Martin Paradis	Won	
Prix Iris	June 5, 2022	Best Sound in a Documentary	Luc Raymond, Guy Pelletier, François Grenon, Maxime Dumesnil, Bernard Gariépy Strobl	Nominated	
