= Brain Freeze (film) =

- Film poster
- Directed by: Julien Knafo
- Written by: Julien Knafo
- Produced by: Barbara Shrier
- Starring: Roy Dupuis; Iani Bédard
- Cinematography: Marc Simpson-Threlford
- Edited by: Glenn Berman
- Music by: Julien Knafo
- Production company: Palomar
- Distributed by: Filmoption
- Release date: August 5, 2021 (Fantasia)
- Running time: 91 minutes
- Country: Canada
- Language: French

Brain Freeze is a 2021 French-Canadian horror comedy film, written, directed, and scored by Julien Knafo.

A satire of class warfare, the film is set in a gated community in Montreal where the neighbourhood golf course has sprayed its grounds with a new experimental fertilizer that automatically melts the snow in winter so that its rich patrons can play golf all year round, but which in turn has contaminated the local water supply and is turning the residents into zombies. Against this backdrop, teenager André (Iani Bédard) must team up with survivalist Dan (Roy Dupuis) to protect themselves and André's baby sister Annie.

The film's cast also includes Marianne Fortier, Anne-Élisabeth Bossé, Claudia Ferri, Mylène Mackay, Stéphane Crête, Mahée Paiement, Jean-Pierre Bergeron and Simon Olivier Fecteau.

It premiered as the opening film of the 2021 Fantasia Film Festival.

== Reception ==
On the review aggregator website Rotten Tomatoes, 75% of 8 critics' reviews are positive, with an average rating of 5.9/10.
