= Prix Iris for Best Editing in a Documentary =

Annual film award presented by Québec Cinéma

The Prix Iris for Best Editing in a Documentary (French: Prix Iris du Meilleur montage d'un long métrage documentaire) is an annual film award, presented by Québec Cinéma as part of its Prix Iris awards program, to honour the year's best film editing in documentary films made within the Cinema of Quebec.

The award was presented for the first time at the 19th Quebec Cinema Awards in 2017.

== 2010s ==
| Year | Editor | Film | Ref |
|---|---|---|---|
2017; 19th Quebec Cinema Awards
| 2017; 19th Quebec Cinema Awards | Catherine Legault | Family Demolition (La démolition familiale) | |
| 2017; 19th Quebec Cinema Awards | Mathieu Bouchard-Malo | Gulîstan, Land of Roses (Gulîstan, terre de roses) | |
| 2017; 19th Quebec Cinema Awards | Jean-François Lord | Manor (Manoir) | |
| 2017; 19th Quebec Cinema Awards | Sami Mermer | Callshop Istanbul | |
| 2017; 19th Quebec Cinema Awards | René Roberge | Living With Giants (Chez les géants) | |
2018; 20th Quebec Cinema Awards
| 2018; 20th Quebec Cinema Awards | Anouk Deschênes | Manic | |
| 2018; 20th Quebec Cinema Awards | Sophie Farkas Bolla | P.S. Jerusalem | |
| 2018; 20th Quebec Cinema Awards | Michel Giroux | The Devil's Share (La Part du diable) | |
| 2018; 20th Quebec Cinema Awards | Lorenzo Mora Salazar, Carlo Guillermo Proto | Resurrecting Hassan (La résurrection d'Hassan) | |
| 2018; 20th Quebec Cinema Awards | Ariane Pétel-Despots | Destierros | |
2019; 21st Quebec Cinema Awards
| 2019; 21st Quebec Cinema Awards | René Roberge | Pauline Julien, Intimate and Political (Pauline Julien, intime et politique) | |
| 2019; 21st Quebec Cinema Awards | Mila Aung-Thwin, Oana Suteu Khintirian | Anote's Ark | |
| 2019; 21st Quebec Cinema Awards | Natacha Dufaux | The Other Rio (L'autre Rio) | |
| 2019; 21st Quebec Cinema Awards | Vincent Guignard, Alexandre Leblanc | A Sister's Song | |
| 2019; 21st Quebec Cinema Awards | Catherine Legault | My Mother's Letters (Les lettres de ma mère) | |

== 2020s ==
| Year | Editor | Film | Ref |
|---|---|---|---|
2020; 22nd Quebec Cinema Awards
| 2020; 22nd Quebec Cinema Awards | Annie Jean | Ziva Postec: The Editor Behind the Film Shoah (Ziva Postec : La monteuse derrière le film Shoah) | |
| 2020; 22nd Quebec Cinema Awards | Benoît Côté, Thomas Rinfret | Mad Dog and the Butcher (Les Derniers vilains) | |
| 2020; 22nd Quebec Cinema Awards | Sylvia De Angelis, Sophie Leblond, Pedro Pires | Alexander Odyssey (Alexandre le fou) | |
| 2020; 22nd Quebec Cinema Awards | Aube Foglia | Dark Suns (Soleils noirs) | |
| 2020; 22nd Quebec Cinema Awards | Natalie Lamoureux | A Woman, My Mother (Une femme, ma mère) | |
2021; 23rd Quebec Cinema Awards
| 2021; 23rd Quebec Cinema Awards | Olivier Higgins, Amélie Labrèche | Wandering: A Rohingya Story (Errance sans retour) | |
| 2021; 23rd Quebec Cinema Awards | Anouk Deschênes | Wintopia | |
| 2021; 23rd Quebec Cinema Awards | Annie Jean, Denys Desjardins | The Castle (Le Château) | |
| 2021; 23rd Quebec Cinema Awards | Annie Jean | The Forbidden Reel | |
| 2021; 23rd Quebec Cinema Awards | Alexandre Lachance | Call Me Human (Je m’appelle humain) | |
2022; 24th Quebec Cinema Awards
| 2022; 24th Quebec Cinema Awards | Louis-Martin Paradis | Big Giant Wave (Comme une vague) | |
| 2022; 24th Quebec Cinema Awards | Félix Dufour-Laperrière | Archipelago (Archipel) | |
| 2022; 24th Quebec Cinema Awards | Jéricho Jeudy | Les Fils | |
| 2022; 24th Quebec Cinema Awards | Catherine Legault | Fanny: The Right to Rock | |
| 2022; 24th Quebec Cinema Awards | Jean-François Lord | Dehors Serge dehors | |
2023; 25th Quebec Cinema Awards
| 2023; 25th Quebec Cinema Awards | Jeremiah Hayes | Dear Audrey | |
| 2023; 25th Quebec Cinema Awards | Mathieu Bouchard-Malo | Rojek | |
| 2023; 25th Quebec Cinema Awards | Emmanuelle Lane | Gabor | |
| 2023; 25th Quebec Cinema Awards | Jacquelyn Mills | Geographies of Solitude | |
| 2023; 25th Quebec Cinema Awards | Oana Suteu Khintirian | Beyond Paper (Au-delà du papier) | |
2024; 26th Quebec Cinema Awards
| 2024; 26th Quebec Cinema Awards | Elric Robichon | Wild Feast (Festin boréal) | |
| 2024; 26th Quebec Cinema Awards | Annie Jean | After the Odyssey (Au lendemain de l'odyssée) | |
| 2024; 26th Quebec Cinema Awards | Emmanuelle Lane | Days (Les Jours) | |
| 2024; 26th Quebec Cinema Awards | Philippe Lefebvre | Scratches of Life: The Art of Pierre Hébert (Graver l'homme: arrêt sur Pierre Hébert) | |
| 2024; 26th Quebec Cinema Awards | Kaveh Nabatian | Kite Zo A: Leave the Bones (Kite Zo A: Laisse les os) | |
2025; 27th Quebec Cinema Awards
| 2025; 27th Quebec Cinema Awards | Charlotte Tourrès | Intercepted | |
| 2025; 27th Quebec Cinema Awards | Heidi Haines | At All Kosts (Koutkékout) | |
| 2025; 27th Quebec Cinema Awards | Josiane Lapointe, Alexandre Leblanc, Lawrence Côté-Collins | Billy | |
| 2025; 27th Quebec Cinema Awards | Catherine Legault | Larry (They/Them) (Larry (iel)) | |
| 2025; 27th Quebec Cinema Awards | Michel Giroux | The Battle of Saint-Léonard (La bataille de Saint-Léonard) | |

== Multiple nominations ==
=== Three or more nominations ===
| Nominations | Editor |
|---|---|
| 4 | Annie Jean |
| 4 | Catherine Legault |

== Combined totals for Best Editing and Best Editing in a Documentary ==
=== Multiple wins ===
| Wins | Editor |
|---|---|
| 6 | Richard Comeau |
| 3 | Stéphane Lafleur |
| 2 | Lorraine Dufour |
| 2 | Dominique Fortin |
| 2 | Sophie Leblond |
| 2 | Yvann Thibaudeau |

=== Three or more nominations ===
| Nominations | Editor |
|---|---|
| 8 | Richard Comeau |
| 8 | Sophie Leblond |
| 6 | Michel Arcand |
| 6 | Mathieu Bouchard-Malo |
| 6 | Aube Foglia |
| 6 | Dominique Fortin |
| 5 | Jean-François Bergeron |
| 5 | Hélène Girard |
| 5 | Yvann Thibaudeau |
| 4 | Glenn Berman |
| 4 | Louise Côté |
| 4 | Annie Jean |
| 4 | Catherine Legault |
| 4 | Arthur Tarnowski |
| 3 | Xavier Dolan |
| 3 | Lorraine Dufour |
| 3 | Michel Giroux |
| 3 | Amélie Labrèche |
| 3 | Stéphane Lafleur |
| 3 | Louis-Martin Paradis |

== See also ==
- Canadian Screen Award for Best Editing in a Documentary
