= 23rd Quebec Cinema Awards =

Awards show for Quebecois cinema in 2020

The 23rd Quebec Cinema Awards were held on June 6, 2021, to honour achievements in the Cinema of Quebec in 2020. A live gala was hosted by actress Geneviève Schmidt; due to the COVID-19 pandemic in Canada, however, it was staged differently than a traditional award gala, with nominees present in the theatre but seated in a way that maintained social distancing requirements. The awards were initially numbered as the 22nd Quebec Cinema Awards gala, despite being the 23rd time the awards have been presented overall, as the presentation of the 2020 awards was done by livestream instead of a traditional award ceremony; however, the awards in 2022 were numbered as the 24th Quebec Cinema Awards instead of the 23rd, indicating that the 2021 awards are now considered the 23rd.

In light of the effects that the pandemic had on film distribution in 2020, the organization did not limit its public-voted Prix Public to the five most commercially successful films of the year, but simply listed all 16 feature films that received commercial theatrical screenings in 2020 as eligible for the vote. Ten days later, they also decided to add all of the eligible documentary films to the Public Prize ballot as well, bringing the total number of nominees in that category to 29. After a first round of voting, the list was reduced to five nominees, including two documentaries: Call Me Human (Je m'appelle humain) and eventual winner The Rose Family (Les Rose).

Nominations were announced on April 26, where five films received ten or more nominations, a first in the ceremony's history. The artisans gala, presenting the awards in craft and technical categories, was held on June 3, 2021 while the other awards were presented on June 6.

Goddess of the Fireflies (La déesse des mouches à feu) tied the record for most nominations with sixteen, including five acting nominations, the third film to achieve this feat. The film won seven awards, including Best Film, Best Director and two acting awards, becoming the first to win both Best Supporting Actress for Caroline Néron and Revelation of the Year for Kelly Depeault.

Underground (Souterrain) and The Vinland Club (Le club Vinland) both received thirteen nominations, with the former winning four awards, including Best Supporting Actor for Théodore Pellerin and Best Screenplay, while the latter won three awards, including Best Actor for Sébastien Ricard. Wandering: A Rohingya Story (Errance sans retour) received five nominations and became the first documentary to take home multiple awards, including Best Documentary.

My Salinger Year received eleven nominations and won one award. Target Number One tied the record for most nominations without receiving a Best Film nomination and ended up losing its ten nominations. The Decline (Jusqu'au déclin), the first Québécois Netflix film, received eight nominations and won one award.

Sébastien Ricard, Émilie Bierre and Théodore Pellerin all received their second acting award during the ceremony. Ricard had previously won Best Actor for Through the Mist (Dédé, à travers les brumes), while Bierre and Pellerin had both won the Revelation of the Year award for A Colony (Une colonie) and Family First (Chien de garde) respectively.

== Nominees and winners ==
Best Film	Best Director
Goddess of the Fireflies (La déesse des mouches à feu) — Luc Vandal; My Salinger Year — Luc Déry, Kim McCraw, Ruth Coady, Susan Mullen; Nadia, Butterfly — Dominique Dussault; Underground (Souterrain) — Étienne Hansez; The Vinland Club (Le club Vinland) — Chantal Lafleur	Anaïs Barbeau-Lavalette, Goddess of the Fireflies (La déesse des mouches à feu); Sophie Dupuis, Underground (Souterrain); Philippe Falardeau, My Salinger Year; Benoît Pilon, The Vinland Club (Le club Vinland); Daniel Roby, Target Number One
Best Actor	Best Actress
Sébastien Ricard, The Vinland Club (Le club Vinland); Réal Bossé, The Decline (Jusqu'au déclin); Paul Doucet, Our Own (Les nôtres); Patrick Hivon, Mont Foster; Antoine Olivier Pilon, Target Number One	Émilie Bierre, Our Own (Les nôtres); Marie-Evelyne Lessard, The Decline (Jusqu'au déclin); Margaret Qualley, My Salinger Year; Sarah Sutherland, Like a House on Fire; Karelle Tremblay, Death of a Ladies' Man
Best Supporting Actor	Best Supporting Actress
Théodore Pellerin, Underground (Souterrain); Normand D'Amour, Goddess of the Fireflies (La déesse des mouches à feu); Rémy Girard, The Vinland Club (Le club Vinland); James Hyndman, Underground (Souterrain); Robin L'Houmeau, Goddess of the Fireflies (La déesse des mouches à feu)	Caroline Néron, Goddess of the Fireflies (La déesse des mouches à feu); Sophie Desmarais, Vacarme; Marianne Farley, Our Own (Les nôtres); Éléonore Loiselle, Goddess of the Fireflies (La déesse des mouches à feu); Sigourney Weaver, My Salinger Year
Revelation of the Year	Best Screenplay
Kelly Depeault, Goddess of the Fireflies (La déesse des mouches à feu); Jasmine Lemée, My Very Own Circus (Mon cirque à moi); Rosalie Pépin, Vacarme; Joakim Robillard, Underground (Souterrain); Arnaud Vachon, The Vinland Club (Le club Vinland)	Sophie Dupuis, Underground (Souterrain); Normand Bergeron, Benoît Pilon and Marc Robitaille, The Vinland Club (Le club Vinland); Philippe Falardeau, My Salinger Year; Catherine Léger, Goddess of the Fireflies (La déesse des mouches à feu); Daniel Roby, Target Number One
Best Documentary	Best Short Documentary
Wandering: A Rohingya Story (Errance sans retour) — Mélanie Carrier, Olivier Higgins; Call Me Human (Je m’appelle humain) — Kim O'Bomsawin, Andrée-Anne Frenette; The Forbidden Reel — Ariel Nasr, Kat Baulu, Sergeo Kirby; I Might Be Dead by Tomorrow (Tant que j'ai du respir dans le corps) — Steve Patry; Wintopia — Mira Burt-Wintonick, Annette Clarke, Bob Moore	The Brother (Le frère) — Jérémie Battaglia, Amélie Lambert Bouchard; Homeport (Port d'attache) — Laurence Lévesque, Élise Bois; Life of a Dog — Danae Elon, Rosana Matecki, Paul Cadieux; Mutts (Clebs) — Halima Ouardiri; Nitrate — Yousra Benziane
Best Live Action Short Film	Best Animated Short Film
Foam (Écume) — Omar Elhamy, Jonathan Beaulieu-Cyr, Paul Chotel; Aniksha — Vincent Toi, Guillaume Collin; Goodbye Golovin — Simon Corriveau-Gagné, Mathieu Grimard; Moon (Lune) — Zoé Pelchat, Mélanie S. Dubois; Shooting Star (Comme une comète) — Ariane Louis-Seize, Fanny Drew, Sarah Mannering	Hibiscus Season (La saison des hibiscus) — Éléonore Goldberg; Barcelona Burning (Barcelona de Foc) — Theodore Ushev; The Fourfold — Alisi Telengut; I, Barnabé (Moi, Barnabé) — Jean-François Lévesque; In the Shadow of the Pines — Anne Koizumi
Best Art Direction	Best Costume Design
Patrice Bengle and Louise Tremblay, The Vinland Club (Le club Vinland); Élise de Blois and Claude Tremblay, My Salinger Year; Sylvain Lemaitre and Louisa Schabas, Blood Quantum; David Pelletier, My Very Own Circus (Mon cirque à moi); David Pelletier, Target Number One	Francesca Chamberland, The Vinland Club (Le club Vinland); Caroline Bodson, Underground (Souterrain); Patricia McNeil and Ann Roth, My Salinger Year; Noémi Poulin, Blood Quantum; Sharon Scott, My Very Own Circus (Mon cirque à moi)
Best Cinematography	Best Cinematography in a Documentary
Mathieu Laverdière, Underground (Souterrain); Jonathan Decoste, Goddess of the Fireflies (La déesse des mouches à feu); François Gamache, The Vinland Club (Le club Vinland); Sara Mishara, My Salinger Year; Tobie Marier Robitaille, Night of the Kings (La nuit des rois)	Olivier Higgins and Renaud Philippe, Wandering: A Rohingya Story (Errance sans retour); Sarah Baril Gaudet, Passage; Hugo Gendron and Michel Valiquette, Call Me Human (Je m’appelle humain); Mathieu Perrault Lapierre, The 108 Journey; Marianne Ploska, Prayer for a Lost Mitten (Prière pour une mitaine perdue)
Best Editing	Best Editing in a Documentary
Stéphane Lafleur, Goddess of the Fireflies (La déesse des mouches à feu); Aube Foglia, Night of the Kings (La nuit des rois); Michel Grou, Underground (Souterrain); Arthur Tarnowski, The Decline (Jusqu'au déclin); Yvann Thibaudeau, Target Number One	Olivier Higgins and Amélie Labrèche, Wandering: A Rohingya Story (Errance sans retour); Anouk Deschênes, Wintopia; Annie Jean and Denys Desjardins, The Castle (Le château); Annie Jean, The Forbidden Reel; Alexandre Lachance, Call Me Human (Je m’appelle humain)
Best Original Music	Best Original Music in a Documentary
Martin Léon, My Salinger Year; Olivier Alary, Night of the Kings (La nuit des rois); Patrice Dubuc and Gaëtan Gravel, Underground (Souterrain); Guido Del Fabbro and Pierre Lapointe, The Vinland Club (Le club Vinland); Jean-Phi Goncalves, Éloi Painchaud and Jorane Pelletier, Target Number One	Justin Guzzwell, Tyr Jami and Eric Shaw, Sisters: Dream & Variations (Soeurs: Rêve et variations); Tom Brunt, Prayer for a Lost Mitten (Prière pour une mitaine perdue); Martin Dumais, Wandering: A Rohingya Story (Errance sans retour); Mathieu Perrault Lapierre, The 108 Journey; Claude Rivest, Jongué: A Nomad's Journey (Jongué, carnet nomade)
Best Sound	Best Sound in a Documentary
Luc Boudrias, Frédéric Cloutier and Patrice LeBlanc, Underground (Souterrain); Pierre-Jules Audet, Emmanuel Croset and Michel Tsagli, Night of the Kings (La nuit des rois); Sylvain Bellemare, Bernard Gariépy Strobl and François Grenon, The Decline (Jusqu'au déclin); Sylvain Bellemare, Paul Col, Bernard Gariépy Strobl and Martyne Morin, Goddess of the Fireflies (La déesse des mouches à feu); Stéphane Bergeron, Olivier Calvert and Martyne Morin, Nadia, Butterfly	Marie-Andrée Cormier, Olivier Germain and Marie-Pierre Grenier, Prayer for a Lost Mitten (Prière pour une mitaine perdue); Pierre-Jules Audet, Luc Boudrias, Olivier Higgins and Kala Miya, Wandering: A Rohingya Story (Errance sans retour); Stéphane Barsalou, Claude Beaugrand and Julie Innes, The Castle (Le château); Benoît Dame and Catherine Van Der Donckt, Jongué: A Nomad's Journey (Jongué, carnet nomade); Olivier Germain and Marie-Pierre Grenier, Wintopia
Best Hairstyling	Best Makeup
Johanne Paiement, Goddess of the Fireflies (La déesse des mouches à feu); Michelle Côté, My Salinger Year; Stéphanie DeFlandre, My Very Own Circus (Mon cirque à moi); André Duval, The Vinland Club (Le club Vinland); Marcelo Nestor Padovani, Blood Quantum	Joan-Patricia Parris, Nancy Ferlatte and Erik Gosselin, Blood Quantum; Audray Adam and Sandra Ruel, Underground (Souterrain); Kathryn Casault, Goddess of the Fireflies (La déesse des mouches à feu); Larysa Chernienko and Natalie Trépanier, Target Number One; Dominique T. Hasbani, The Decline (Jusqu'au déclin)
Best Visual Effects	Best Casting
Sébastien Chartier, Jean-François Ferland and Marie-Claude Lafontaine, The Decline (Jusqu'au déclin); Michael Beaulac and Marie-Hélène Panisset, Target Number One; Barbara Rosenstein and Josh Sherrett, Blood Quantum	Murielle La Ferrière and Marie-Claude Robitaille, Goddess of the Fireflies (La déesse des mouches à feu); Deirdre Bowen, Heidi Levitt, Bruno Rosato and Supattra Punyadee, Target Number One; Marjolaine Lachance, Underground (Souterrain); Marjolaine Lachance, Our Own (Les nôtres); Pierre Pageau and Daniel Poisson, The Vinland Club (Le club Vinland)
Most Successful Film Outside Quebec	Public Prize
The Song of Names — François Girard; Goddess of the Fireflies (La déesse des mouches à feu) — Anaïs Barbeau-Lavalette; My Salinger Year - Philippe Falardeau; Nadia, Butterfly - Pascal Plante; Target Number One - Daniel Roby	The Rose Family (Les Rose); Call Me Human (Je m'appelle humain); The Decline (Jusqu'au déclin); Goddess of the Fireflies (La déesse des mouches à feu); The Vinland Club (Le club Vinland)
Best First Film	Iris Tribute
Vacarme — Neegan Trudel; Felix and the Treasure of Morgäa (Félix et le trésor de Morgäa) — Nicola Lemay; The Decline (Jusqu'au déclin) — Patrice Laliberté	Association coopérative de productions audio-visuelles (ACPAV)

== Multiple wins and nominations ==
=== Films with multiple nominations ===
Nominations	Film
16	Goddess of the Fireflies (La déesse des mouches à feu)
13	Underground (Souterrain)
13	The Vinland Club (Le club Vinland)
11	My Salinger Year
10	Target Number One
8	The Decline (Jusqu'au déclin)
5	Blood Quantum
5	Wandering: A Rohingya Story (Errance sans retour)
4	Call Me Human (Je m'appelle humain)
4	My Very Own Circus (Mon cirque à moi)
4	Night of the Kings (La nuit des rois)
4	Our Own (Les nôtres)
3	Nadia, Butterfly
3	Prayer for a Lost Mitten (Prière pour une mitaine perdue)
3	Vacarme
3	Wintopia
2	The 108 Journey
2	The Castle (Le château)
2	The Forbidden Reel
2	Jongué: A Nomad's Journey (Jongué, carnet nomade)

=== Films with multiple wins ===
Wins	Film
7	Goddess of the Fireflies (La déesse des mouches à feu)
4	Underground (Souterrain)
3	The Vinland Club (Le club Vinland)
3	Wandering: A Rohingya Story (Errance sans retour)
