= Prix Iris for Best Sound in a Documentary =

Annual film award

The Prix Iris for Best Sound in a Documentary (French: Prix Iris du meilleur son film documentaire) is an annual film award, presented by Québec Cinéma as part of its Prix Iris awards program, to honour the year's best film sound in documentary films made within the Cinema of Quebec.

The award was presented for the first time at the 20th Quebec Cinema Awards in 2018.

Jean Paul Vialard received the most nominations, six, and won two consecutive awards in 2019 and 2020.

== 2010s ==
Year	Winners and nominees	Film	Ref
2018; 20th Quebec Cinema Awards
2018; 20th Quebec Cinema Awards	Catherine Van Der Donckt, Jean Paul Vialard	The Devil's Share (La Part du diable)	
2018; 20th Quebec Cinema Awards	Daniel Almada, Patrick Becker, Julien Fréchette, Reto Stamm, Christof Steinmann	The Dispossessed (Les dépossédés)	
2018; 20th Quebec Cinema Awards	Sylvain Bellemare, Bernard Gariépy Strobl, Félix Lamarche	Far Away Lands (Les terres lointaines)	
2018; 20th Quebec Cinema Awards	Samuel Gagnon-Thibodeau, Alexis Pilon-Gladu	Destierros	
2018; 20th Quebec Cinema Awards	Carlo Guillermo Proto, Cory Rizos, Pablo Villegas	Resurrecting Hassan (La résurrection d'Hassan)	
2019; 21st Quebec Cinema Awards
2019; 21st Quebec Cinema Awards	Cyril Bourseaux, Mélanie Gauthier, Simon Léveillé, Simon Plouffe, Lynne Trépanier, Jean Paul Vialard, Shikuan Shetush Vollant	Those Who Come, Will Hear (Ceux qui viendront, l'entendront)	
2019; 21st Quebec Cinema Awards	Claude Beaugrand, Luc Boudrias, Serge Giguère	My Mother's Letters (Les lettres de ma mère)	
2019; 21st Quebec Cinema Awards	Bruno Bélanger, Marie-Pierre Grenier, Francisco Heron De Alencar	The Other Rio (L'autre Rio)	
2019; 21st Quebec Cinema Awards	Olivier Calvert, Jean Paul Vialard	Pauline Julien, Intimate and Political (Pauline Julien, intime et politique)	
2019; 21st Quebec Cinema Awards	Andrés Carrasco, Miguel Hormazábal, Mauricio López, Alison McAlpine, Rodrigo Salvatierra, Carlo Sanchez Farías, Claudio Vargas	Cielo	

== 2020s ==
Year	Winners and nominees	Film	Ref
2020; 22nd Quebec Cinema Awards
2020; 22nd Quebec Cinema Awards	Wolfgang Beck, Mustafa Bölükbasi, Kerem Çakir, Huseyin Can Erol, Sonat Hançer, Eric Lebœuf, Bruno Pucella, Ibrahim Tarhan, Yener Yalçin, Tolga Yelekçi	Istanbul Echoes (Échos d'Istanbul)	
2020; 22nd Quebec Cinema Awards	Luc Boudrias, Patrice LeBlanc	A Woman, My Mother (Une femme, ma mère)	
2020; 22nd Quebec Cinema Awards	Sylvain Brassard, Benoit Leduc, Gaël Poisson Lemay	Alexander Odyssey (Alexandre le fou)	
2020; 22nd Quebec Cinema Awards	Shelley Craig, Marie-Pierre Grenier, Luc Léger, Geoffrey Mitchell	Where the Land Ends (La Fin des terres)	
2020; 22nd Quebec Cinema Awards	René Portillo	Havana, from on High (Sur les toits Havane)	
2021; 23rd Quebec Cinema Awards
2021; 23rd Quebec Cinema Awards	Marie-Andrée Cormier, Olivier Germain, Marie-Pierre Grenier	Prayer for a Lost Mitten (Prière pour une mitaine perdue)	
2021; 23rd Quebec Cinema Awards	Pierre-Jules Audet, Luc Boudrias, Olivier Higgins, Kala Miya	Wandering: A Rohingya Story (Errance sans retour)	
2021; 23rd Quebec Cinema Awards	Stéphane Barsalou, Claude Beaugrand, Julie Innes	The Castle (Le Château)	
2021; 23rd Quebec Cinema Awards	Benoît Dame, Catherine Van Der Donckt	Jongué: A Nomad's Journey (Jongué, carnet nomade)	
2021; 23rd Quebec Cinema Awards	Olivier Germain, Marie-Pierre Grenier	Wintopia	
2022; 24th Quebec Cinema Awards
2022; 24th Quebec Cinema Awards	Bruno Bélanger, Manon Cousin, Louis-Philippe Amyot, Ivann Uruena, René Portillo	Les Fils	
2022; 24th Quebec Cinema Awards	Olivier Calvert, Samuel Gagnon-Thibodeau, Jean-Paul Vialard	Archipelago (Archipel)	
2022; 24th Quebec Cinema Awards	Simon Gervais, Alexis Pilon-Gladu	Rumba Rules, New Genealogies (Rumba Rules, nouvelles généalogies)	
2022; 24th Quebec Cinema Awards	Luc Raymond, Guy Pelletier, François Grenon, Maxime Dumesnil, Bernard Gariépy Strobl	Big Giant Wave (Comme une vague)	
2022; 24th Quebec Cinema Awards	Daniel Toussaint, Ginette Bellavance	Fanny: The Right to Rock	
2023; 25th Quebec Cinema Awards
2023; 25th Quebec Cinema Awards	Andreas Mendritzki, Jacquelyn Mills	Geographies of Solitude	
2023; 25th Quebec Cinema Awards	Mélanie Gauthier, Jeremiah Hayes, Isabelle Lussier	Dear Audrey	
2023; 25th Quebec Cinema Awards	Maxime Lacoste-Lebuis, Eric Shaw, Jean Paul Vialard	Far Beyond the Pasturelands (Au-delà des hautes vallées)	
2023; 25th Quebec Cinema Awards	Jean-François Sauvé, Martin M. Messier, Bruno Pucella	305 Bellechasse	
2023; 25th Quebec Cinema Awards	Catherine Van Der Donckt, Jean Paul Vialard	Beyond Paper (Au-delà du papier)	
2024; 26th Quebec Cinema Awards
2024; 26th Quebec Cinema Awards	Sylvain Bellemare, Hans Laitres, Daniel Capeille	The White Guard (La Garde blanche)	
2024; 26th Quebec Cinema Awards	Ilyaa Ghafouri, Shelley Craig, Thomas Sédillot	Scratches of Life: The Art of Pierre Hébert (Graver l'homme: arrêt sur Pierre Hébert)	
2024; 26th Quebec Cinema Awards	Sacha Ratcliffe, Hans Laitres, Joseph Ray, Roudie Rigaud Marcelin	Kite Zo A: Leave the Bones (Kite Zo A: Laisse les os)	
2024; 26th Quebec Cinema Awards	Catherine Van Der Donckt, Bruno Bélanger, Olivier Léger	After the Odyssey (Au lendemain de l'odyssée)	
2024; 26th Quebec Cinema Awards	Catherine Van Der Donckt, Isabelle Lussier, Richard Saindon, Guillaume Lévesque	Malartic	
2025; 27th Quebec Cinema Awards
2025; 27th Quebec Cinema Awards	Alex Lane, Artem Kosynskyi	Intercepted	
2025; 27th Quebec Cinema Awards	Olivier Calvert, Pier-Luc Latulippe, Bruno Bélanger	Simon and Marianne (Simon et Marianne)	
2025; 27th Quebec Cinema Awards	Benoît Dame, Vuk Stojanović, Alexandre Leblanc, Mathieu Lacourse, Martin M. Messier	Billy	
2025; 27th Quebec Cinema Awards	Camille Demers-Lambert, Marie-Pierre Grenier, Olivier Germain	Okurimono	
2025; 27th Quebec Cinema Awards	Simon Gervais, Laurence Turcotte-Fraser, Nicolas Dallaire	The Battle of Saint-Léonard (La bataille de Saint-Léonard)	

== Multiple wins and nominations ==
=== Multiple wins ===
Wins	Technician
2	Jean Paul Vialard

=== Three or more nominations ===
Nominations	Technician
6	Jean Paul Vialard
5	Marie-Pierre Grenier
4	Bruno Bélanger
4	Catherine Van Der Donckt
3	Luc Boudrias
3	Olivier Germain

== Combined totals for Best Sound and Best Sound in a Documentary ==
=== Multiple wins ===
Wins	Technician
10	Bernard Gariépy Strobl
6	Sylvain Bellemare
6	Claude Beaugrand
6	Hans Peter Strobl
5	Claude La Haye
4	Stéphane Bergeron
4	Luc Boudrias
4	Olivier Calvert
3	Mathieu Beaudin
3	Pierre Bertrand
3	Louis Gignac
3	Martin Pinsonnault
2	Gilles Corbeil
2	Stephen De Oliveira
2	Michel Descombes
2	Marie-Claude Gagné
2	Marie-Pierre Grenier
2	Hans Laitres
2	Guy Pelletier
2	Marcel Pothier
2	Jean Paul Vialard

=== Three or more nominations ===
Nominations	Technician
32	Bernard Gariépy Strobl
27	Luc Boudrias
23	Sylvain Bellemare
19	Olivier Calvert
16	Stéphane Bergeron
15	Claude La Haye
14	Claude Beaugrand
13	Hans Peter Strobl
12	Gavin Fernandes
10	Louis Gignac
9	Pierre-Jules Audet
9	Marie-Claude Gagné
8	Stephen de Oliveira
7	Pierre Bertrand
6	Gilles Corbeil
6	Marie-Pierre Grenier
6	Hans Laitres
6	Patrice Leblanc
6	Christian Rivest
6	Jean Paul Vialard
5	Mario Auclair
5	Bruno Bélanger
5	Dominique Chartrand
5	Martin Pinsonnault
5	Marcel Pothier
5	Patrick Rousseau
4	Serge Beauchemin
4	Michel B. Bordeleau
4	Sylvain Brassard
4	Yann Cleary
4	Michel Descombes
4	Louis Dupire
4	Samuel Gagnon-Thibodeau
4	Simon Gervais
4	François Grenon
4	Michel Lecoufle
4	Martyne Morin
4	Jean-François Sauvé
4	Catherine Van Der Donckt
3	Mathieu Beaudin
3	Jean-Sébastien Beaudoin-Gagnon
3	Yvon Benoît
3	Jo Caron
3	Michel Charron
3	Dominique Delguste
3	Olivier Germain
3	Clovis Gouaillier
3	Louis Hone
3	Isabelle Lussier
3	Guy Pelletier
3	Simon Poudrette
3	Sacha Ratcliffe
3	Lynne Trépanier

== See also ==
- Canadian Screen Award for Best Sound Design in a Documentary
