= Peter Wintonick =

Canadian documentary filmmaker (1953–2013)

- Born: June 10, 1953; Trenton, Ontario, Canada
- Died: November 18, 2013 (aged 60); Montreal, Quebec, Canada
- Occupation: Documentary filmmaker
- Children: Mira Burt-Wintonick
- Awards: Governor General's Award in Visual and Media Arts

Peter Kenneth Wintonick (June 10, 1953 – November 18, 2013) was a Canadian independent documentary filmmaker based in Montreal. A winner of the 2006 Governor General's Award in Visual and Media Arts, former Thinker in Residence for the Premier of South Australia, prolific award-winning filmmaker, he was one of Canada's best known international documentarians.

== Biography ==
Born in Trenton, Ontario in 1953, Wintonick was the son of John Wintonick and Norma Latham. He was of Ukrainian descent.

He founded Necessary Illusions Productions with Mark Achbar, and subsequently ran it with Francis Miquet. Wintonick was a co-founder of DocAgora, an event inserted into various film festivals showcasing cutting-edge digital strategies. He co-directed, with his daughter, Mira Burt-Wintonick, the 2009 documentary PilgrIMAGE, a film about documentary filmmaking.

Wintonick died of cholangiocarcinoma on November 18, 2013, aged 60.

== Select filmography ==
- Manufacturing Consent: Noam Chomsky and the Media (1992) with Mark Achbar and Francis Miquet
- Cinéma Vérité: Defining the Moment (1999) with the National Film Board of Canada
- Seeing is Believing: Handicams, Human Rights and the News (2002) winner of the Dan & Ewa Abraham and Tammy Abraham Award for Films of Conflict & Resolution at the 2002 Hamptons International Film Festival and Gemini Award nominee, co-directed with Katerina Cizek

== Other work ==
In early 2005, at the invitation of the premier of South Australia, he filled the post of Thinker in Residence, examining the future of documentaries and the digital revolution with a focus on educational and cultural legislation.

== Governor General's Award ==
Wintonick was the winner of a 2006 Governor General's Award in Visual and Media Arts. His body of work includes dramatic features, theatrical documentaries, educational and socio-political works.

== Legacy ==
In 2014, a new award called the Peter Wintonick Award was given at Sheffield Doc/Fest to Vessel. The award was presented by Martin Rosenbaum, who read a message from Wintonick's daughter Mira, which said that she was very happy to see the award go to "a filmmaker who embodies his activist spirit." Wintonick's film Manufacturing Consent: Noam Chomsky and the Media was also screened at the festival.

He is the subject of his daughter Mira's 2019 film Wintopia.
