= Jacques Lanctôt =

Canadian writer, publisher, terrorist, and restaurateur

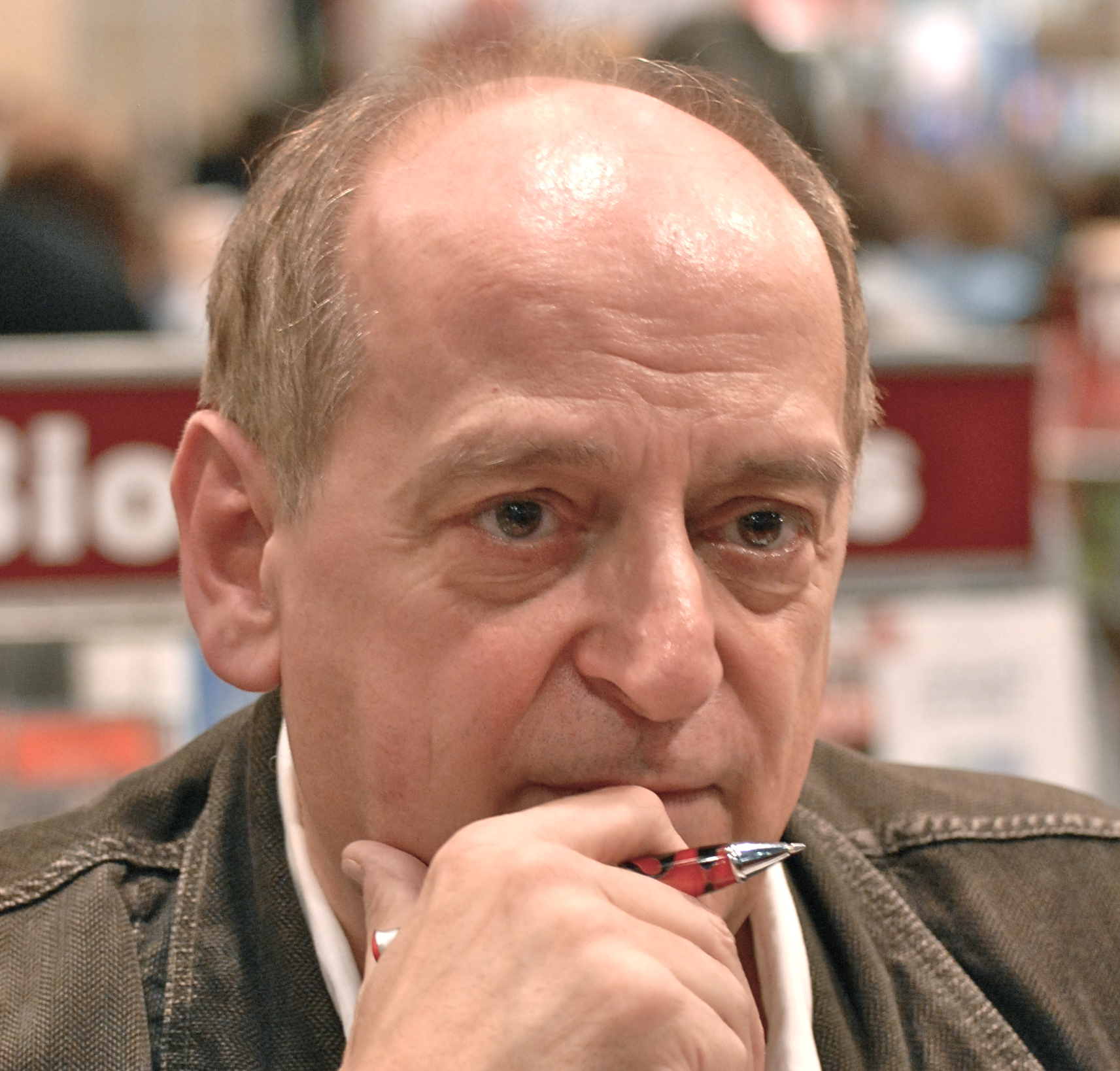
- Jacques Lanctôt in 2010 at the Montréal Book Fair
- Born: 5 November 1945 (age 80)
- Occupations: Publisher, writer
- Known for: Kidnapping James Cross

Jacques Lanctôt (born November 5, 1945) is a Canadian writer, publisher, and restaurateur. He was a member of the Front de libération du Québec (FLQ) and was convicted on terrorism charges for his role in the kidnapping of British diplomat James Cross in October 1970. Lanctôt is the son of Gérard Lanctôt, a former head of the Parti de l'Unité nationale du Canada, a fascist party promoting Canadian nationalism.

After Cross was released, Lanctôt and the other kidnappers were allowed to leave Canada. Lanctôt later returned to Canada in 1979, and served two years in prison. Following his release he set up a publishing house.

He is the subject of The Eighth Floor (Le huitième étage, jours de révolte), a 2023 documentary film by Pedro Ruiz.
