= Asiemut =

- Directed by: Olivier Higgins; Mélanie Carrier
- Written by: Olivier Higgins; Mélanie Carrier
- Produced by: Olivier Higgins; Mélanie Carrier
- Cinematography: Olivier Higgins; Mélanie Carrier
- Edited by: Olivier Higgins; Eric Denis
- Release date: October 2006
- Country: Canada
- Language: French

Asiemut is a Canadian documentary film depicting the 8,000 kilometres (5,000 mi) cycling and philosophical journey of a young French Canadian couple from Mongolia to India. It was entirely filmed, directed and produced by Olivier Higgins and Mélanie Carrier. Asiemut has won 35 prizes in festivals around the world.

== Synopsis ==
Asiemut chronicles the 8000 km journey of Olivier Higgins and Mélanie Carrier.

Riding their bicycles through Asia, Olivier and Mélanie travel from Mongolia to Kolkata, at the mouth of the Ganges in India, passing through Xinjiang, the Taklamakan Desert, Tibet and Nepal. Amid the obstacles along the way, they discover the world, and themselves, including who they are, what they want, and what their place in the world is.

== Significance of the title ==
"Asiemut" is a variation on the word azimuth, the direction taken when following a compass, or metaphorically, the direction taken when following one's life journey, together with an allusion to the continent of Asia where the journey was made.

== Impact ==
The film inspired Bill and Stephanie A. Frans to undertake their own long-distance cycle journey.

== Awards ==
Asiemut has won 35 awards in film festivals around the world, such as the "Oscar of the Oscar" of mountain and adventure films in 2008 in Italy. Asiemut was part of the Banff World Tour and has been screened in more than 40 different countries.

- 2008 Grand Prize over all, Cervino CineMountain Film Festival, Italy
- 2008 Public Grand Prize, La Rochelle Festival du Film d'Aventure, France
- 2008 Grand Prix du Public, International Mountain Film Festival of Slovenia
- 2008 Grand Prix du Festival, Festival Planète Couleur, France
- 2007 Festival Grand Prize, Graz International Mountain and Culture Film Festival, Austria
- 2007 Festival Grand Prize, Tegernsee International Mountain Film Festival, Germany
- 2007 Public Grand Prize, Tegernsee International Mountain Film Festival, Germany
- 2007 Jury's Special Prize, Danish Adventure Film Festival, Denmark
- 2007 Golden Frame Award, Explorer's Film Festival, Poland
- 2007 People Choice Award, Dundee Mountain Film Festival, Scotland
- 2007 People Choice Award, Festival Explorimages, France
- 2007 Festival Grand Prize, Williamstown Mountain Film Festival, US
- 2007 Festival Grand Prize, Teplice Mountain Film Festival 2007, Czech Republic
- 2007 Public Grand Prize, Festival International du Film Des Diablerets, Switzerland
- 2007 Jury's Special Prize, Festival International du Film Des Diablerets, Switzerland
- 2007 Banskî Tourism Award, International Mountain Film Festival of Bulgaria
- 2007 Best Adventure Film, InkaFest, Perù
- 2007 Best Adventure Film, Squamish International Mountain Film Festival, Canada
- 2007 Festival's Grand Prize, Vanka Regule Festival, Croatia
- 2007 Special Jury Mention, International Festival of Mountain Film, Slovakia
- 2007 People Choice Award, Festival des Films d'Aventure de La Réunion
- 2007 Most Inspiring Film Prize, Boulder Adventure Film Festival, US
- 2007 Public Choice Award, Wanaka Mountain Film Festival, New Zealand
- 2007 Grand Prize-Best Film, Mountain Film Festival of Slovakia
- 2007 People Choice Award, Festivale Internationale des Films D'Aventure de Val D'Isère, France
- 2007 Prix ESPOIR du Jury, Festival Internationale des Films D'Aventure de Val D'Isère, France
- 2007 Grand Prize – Best Film, Vancouver International Mountain Film Festival, Canada
- 2007 Grand Prize – Best Film, Fort William Mountain Film Festival, Scotland
- 2007 Best Film on Mountain Sport, Flagstaff Mountain Film Festival, US
- 2007 People Choice Award, Banff International Mountain Film Festival, Canada
- 2007 Special Jury Award, Banff International Mountain Film Festival, Canada
- 2007 Grandvalira & Silver Edelweiss, Festival Internationale des Films de Montagne de Torello, Spain
- 2006 New Creator Prize, Festival Internationale des Films d'Aventure de Montréal, Canada
- 2006 New Creator Prize, Festival Internationale des Films de Montagne d'Autrans, France
- 2006 Special Jury Award, International Adventure Film Festival of Dijon, France
