= Prix Iris for Best Original Music in a Documentary =

Annual Canadian film award

The Prix Iris for Best Original Music in a Documentary (French: Prix Iris de la meilleur court métrage documentaire) is an annual award, presented by Québec Cinéma as part of its Prix Iris program, to honour the best music for documentary films made in the Cinema of Quebec. The award was presented for the first time at the 23rd Quebec Cinema Awards in 2021.

== 2020s ==
Year	Nominee	Film	Ref
2021; 23rd Quebec Cinema Awards
2021; 23rd Quebec Cinema Awards	Justin Guzzwell, Tyr Jami, Eric Shaw	Sisters: Dream & Variations	
2021; 23rd Quebec Cinema Awards	Tom Brunt	Prayer for a Lost Mitten (Prière pour une mitaine perdue)	
2021; 23rd Quebec Cinema Awards	Martin Dumais	Wandering: A Rohingya Story (Errance sans retour)	
2021; 23rd Quebec Cinema Awards	Mathieu Perrault Lapierre	The 108 Journey	
2021; 23rd Quebec Cinema Awards	Claude Rivest	Jongué: A Nomad's Journey (Jongué, carnet nomade)	
2022; 24th Quebec Cinema Awards
2022; 24th Quebec Cinema Awards	Stéphane Lafleur, Christophe Lamarche-Ledoux	Archipelago (Archipel)	
2022; 24th Quebec Cinema Awards	Samuel Laflamme, Dominique Fils-Aimé	Alone (Seuls)	
2022; 24th Quebec Cinema Awards	Robert Marcel Lepage	Antisemitism (Antisémitismes)	
2022; 24th Quebec Cinema Awards	Robert Marcel Lepage	My Mom's Co-op (La coop de ma mère)	
2022; 24th Quebec Cinema Awards	Projet E.V.E., Michel Robidoux, Bill Gagnon	Les Fils	
2023; 25th Quebec Cinema Awards
2023; 25th Quebec Cinema Awards	Daniel Baillargeon	Gabor	
2023; 25th Quebec Cinema Awards	Olivier Alary, Johannes Malfatti	Twice Colonized	
2023; 25th Quebec Cinema Awards	Walker Grimshaw	Dear Audrey	
2023; 25th Quebec Cinema Awards	Maxime Lacoste-Lebuis	Far Beyond the Pasturelands (Au-delà des hautes vallées)	
2023; 25th Quebec Cinema Awards	Delphine Measroch	Humus	
2024; 26th Quebec Cinema Awards
2024; 26th Quebec Cinema Awards	Mimi Allard	The White Guard (La Garde blanche)	
2024; 26th Quebec Cinema Awards	Pierre-Philippe Côté	Days (Les Jours)	
2024; 26th Quebec Cinema Awards	Liana El Amraoui, Jacob Desjardins	Eviction (Éviction)	
2024; 26th Quebec Cinema Awards	Jérôme Minière	The Eighth Floor (Le Huitième étage, jours de révolte)	
2024; 26th Quebec Cinema Awards	Lakou Mizik, Joseph Ray	Kite Zo A: Leave the Bones (Kite Zo A: Laisse les os)	
2025; 27th Quebec Cinema Awards
2025; 27th Quebec Cinema Awards	Benoit Pinette, Marc-André Landry	Simon and Marianne (Simon et Marianne)	
2025; 27th Quebec Cinema Awards	Wilhelm Brandl	Okurimono	
2025; 27th Quebec Cinema Awards	Marc Gravel	The Battle of Saint-Léonard (La bataille de Saint-Léonard)	
2025; 27th Quebec Cinema Awards	Martin Lizotte	Waiting for Casimir (En attendant Casimir)	
2025; 27th Quebec Cinema Awards	Martin Roy, Luc Sicard	Billy	

== Combined totals for Best Original Music and Best Original Music in a Documentary ==
=== Multiple wins ===
Wins	Composer
3	Daniel Bélanger
3	Philippe Brault
3	Martin Léon
2	Guy Bélanger
2	Ramachandra Borcar
2	Christophe Lamarche-Ledoux

=== Three or more nominations ===
Nominations	Composer
7	Robert Marcel Lepage
6	Philippe Brault
6	Benoît Charest
6	Michel Corriveau
6	Michel Cusson
6	Martin Léon
5	Gaëtan Gravel
5	Christophe Lamarche-Ledoux
4	Viviane Audet
4	Guy Bélanger
4	Robin-Joël Cool
4	Normand Corbeil
4	Pierre-Philippe Côté
4	Patrice Dubuc
3	Olivier Alary
3	Daniel Bélanger
3	Bertrand Chenier
3	Jorane
3	FM Le Sieur
3	Alexis Martin
3	Éloi Painchaud

== See also ==
- Prix Iris for Best Original Music
- Canadian Screen Award for Best Original Music in a Documentary
