= Félix Rose =

Canadian documentary filmmaker

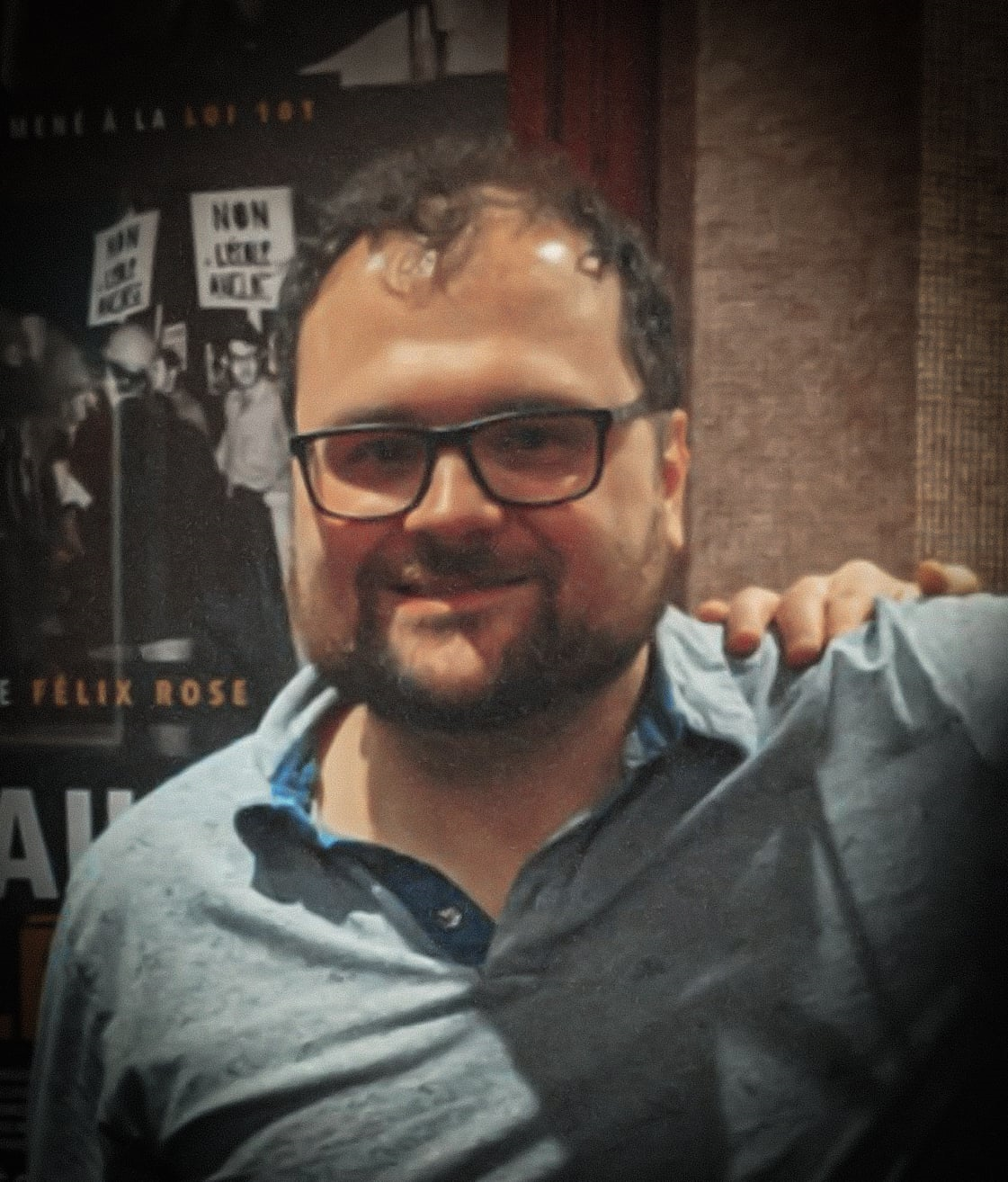
- Born: July 15, 1987 (age 38); Montreal, Quebec, Canada
- Occupation: Documentary filmmaker
- Years active: 2010s–present

Félix Rose (born July 15, 1987) is a Canadian documentary filmmaker from Quebec. He is most noted for his 2020 film The Rose Family (Les Rose), which was the winner of the Public Prize at the 23rd Quebec Cinema Awards in 2021.

He is the son of Paul Rose, a former leader of the Front de libération du Québec, and the film centred on Félix's complicated familial legacy as the son of a convicted murderer.

In the same year as The Rose Family, he also released Le dernier felquiste, a television documentary miniseries about the still-unsolved assassination of Mario Bachand, on the Club Illico streaming service.

In 2024 he released The Battle of Saint-Léonard (La bataille de Saint-Léonard), which received four nominations at the 27th Quebec Cinema Awards in 2025.

== Filmography ==
- Avec la gauche - 2014
- Marie-Paule déménage - 2015
- Le Gérant - 2015
- Yes - 2016
- Le dernier felquiste - 2020
- The Rose Family (Les Rose) - 2020
- The Battle of Saint-Léonard (La bataille de Saint-Léonard) - 2024
- Québec Rock - Offenbach vs. Corbeau - 2024
