= Lac-Mégantic: This Is Not an Accident =

Canadian TV documentary series about the 2013 Lac-Mégantic, Canada train disaster

- Written by: Philippe Falardeau; Nancy Guerin
- Directed by: Philippe Falardeau
- Music by: Mathieu Charbonneau; Christophe Lamarche-Ledoux
- Country of origin: Canada
- Original language: French
- No. of episodes: 4

Production
- Executive producer: Carlos Soldevila
- Producer: Annie Sirois
- Editor: Elric Robichon
- Production company: Trio Orange

Original release
- Release: 2023

Lac-Mégantic: This Is Not an Accident (French: Lac-Mégantic : ceci n’est pas un accident) is a Canadian documentary television series, directed by Philippe Falardeau and released in 2023. The series centres on the Lac-Mégantic rail disaster of 2013, profiling both the bureaucratic failures that allowed the disaster to happen and the regulatory inaction that has hampered efforts to prevent a similar tragedy from happening again.

The series premiered at the 2023 Canneseries festival, and was screened at the 2023 Hot Docs Canadian International Documentary Festival, in advance of its television premiere on May 2, 2023, on Vidéotron's Vrai streaming platform for documentaries.

== Reception ==
=== Critical response ===
Andrew Parker of TheGATE.ca praised the series, writing that Falardeau "masterfully paces everything and finds every possible piece necessary to form a comprehensive picture of grief, corporate malfeasance, and governmental shortcomings that protect corporations more than they do everyday citizens."

=== Awards ===
Award	Date of ceremony	Category	Recipient	Result	Ref.
Hot Docs Canadian International Documentary Festival	2023	Hot Docs Audience Award		Won	
Gémeaux Awards	2024	Best Direction in a Documentary Series	Philippe Falardeau	Won	
Gémeaux Awards	2024	Best Writing in a Documentary Series	Philippe Falardeau, Nancy Guerin	Won	
Gémeaux Awards	2024	Best Photography, Documentary or Public Affairs	Nicolas Bolduc, Erik Ljung, Tobie Marier Robitaille, Sara Mishara, Alexia Toman, Van Royko, André Turpin	Won	
Gémeaux Awards	2024	Best Editing, Documentary or Public Affairs	Elric Robichon	Won	
Gémeaux Awards	2024	Best Research	Amélie Nadeau, Nancy Guerin, Catherine Hébert, Laurent K. Blais, Ghislain O’Prêtre	Won	
