= The Other Side of the Country =

2007 film by Catherine hébert

- Theatrical release poster
- French: De l'autre côté du pays
- Directed by: Catherine Hébert
- Written by: Catherine Hébert
- Produced by: Catherine Hébert
- Cinematography: Sébastien Gros
- Edited by: Annie Jean
- Production company: Mango Films
- Release date: November 17, 2007 (RIDM)
- Running time: 84 minutes
- Country: Canada
- Language: French

The Other Side of the Country (French: De l'autre côté du pays) is a 2007 Canadian documentary film directed by Catherine Hébert. The film profiles the humanitarian crisis in Uganda in the early 2000s.

The film premiered at the 2007 Montreal International Documentary Festival, where it was the winner of the Prix du Public.

The film was a Jutra Award nominee for Best Documentary Film at the 11th Jutra Awards in 2009.
