= Nadia, Butterfly =

2020 Canadian drama film

- Film poster
- Directed by: Pascal Plante
- Written by: Pascal Plante
- Produced by: Dominique Dussault
- Starring: Katerine Savard; Ariane Mainville; Hilary Caldwell; Pierre-Yves Cardinal
- Cinematography: Stéphanie Weber Biron
- Edited by: Amélie Labrèche
- Production company: Nemesis Films
- Distributed by: Maison 4:3
- Release date: September 16, 2020 (FCVQ)
- Running time: 107 minutes
- Country: Canada
- Languages: French; English

Nadia, Butterfly is a 2020 Canadian sports drama film, directed by Pascal Plante and released in 2020.

The film stars Katerine Savard as Nadia, an Olympic swimmer struggling to redefine her life after retiring from the sport at the conclusion of the 2020 Summer Olympics. Its cast also includes Canadian competitive swimmers Ariane Mainville and Hilary Caldwell in supporting roles as Nadia's friends and teammates, as well as Pierre-Yves Cardinal.

== Cast ==
- Katerine Savard as Nadia
- Ariane Mainville as Marie-Pierre
- Pierre-Yves Cardinal as Sébastien
- Hilary Caldwell as Karen
- Cailin McMurray as Jess

== Production and distribution ==
Plante wrote the film in part based on his own experiences as a competitive swimmer who tried out, but did not qualify, to represent Canada at the 2008 Summer Olympics. He has described the film as "basically a film about the post-Olympic blues, the very tipping point of that transition from being an athlete to having to redefine herself and understanding what it means to leave it all behind". Savard, an Olympic swimmer, auditioned for the role after being one of the swimmers Plante consulted for input into the screenplay. The film was shot in Montreal and Tokyo in 2019, with swimming scenes filmed at Montreal's real Olympic Pool from the 1976 Summer Olympics.

The film was named as an Official Selection of the 2020 Cannes Film Festival, but was not screened due to the cancellation of the physical festival in light of the COVID-19 pandemic. It instead premiered at the 2020 Quebec City Film Festival, and had its commercial premiere on September 18, 2020.

== Reception ==
=== Critical response ===
For The Hollywood Reporter, David Rooney wrote that "Most movies about the physical rigors and psychological toll that force high-performance athletes to give up their chosen discipline — whether it's swimming, track and field, ballet or any other — tend to focus on the pain and injuries, the punishing schedule, the exhaustion, the disappointments of a career in decline. What makes Plante's drama distinctive is that the decision to quit has already been made both privately and publicly, and the detachment is already in process as Nadia (Katerine Savard) gives an awkward press interview while she's still catching her breath after an individual race toward the close of the Tokyo Summer Olympics. "I guess I'm trying to end on a good note", she says, visibly anxious to step away".

Writing for The Globe and Mail, Barry Hertz stated that the unfortunate coincidence of the film's timing, having been filmed before but released after the cancellation of the 2020 Tokyo Olympics, gave the film's setting at that event an unintentional veneer of alternate history. He opined that "while Savard has her moments - including a deep cry backstage after capturing the bronze - she is not strong enough to do the heavy emotional lifting that the film's script requires. As written by Plante, Nadia is a woman at constant war with her instincts, requiring a performer to find a way to wordlessly convey such tension on-screen. Savard mostly offers faraway stares, frequently looking lost and in need of micro-managed direction". He concluded that the film "is not quite a medallist. But it's certainly a spirited contender".

Chris Knight of the National Post also concurred that the film's setting at an event that was cancelled in reality technically made it a science fiction movie, but praised Savard and the other non-professional actors in the cast for their naturalistic performances. He rated the film 4.5 stars out of five, concluding that "Nadia, Butterfly doesn’t feature any fireworks beyond the literal kind that mark those Games that never actually took place. But it doesn’t need to. The introspection and contemplative mood are all that is required to pull the viewer into this woman’s world. Nadia may have only come in third place at the Olympics, but Nadia, Butterfly takes the gold".

The film was named to TIFF's year-end Canada's Top Ten list for feature films.

=== Awards and nominations ===
Award	Date of ceremony	Category	Recipient(s)	Result	Ref(s)
Association québécoise des critiques de cinéma	May 7, 2021	Prix Luc-Perreault	Pascal Plante	Won	
Canadian Cinema Editors	June 3, 2021	Best Editing in a Feature Film	Amélie Labrèche	Nominated	
Canadian Screen Awards	May 20, 2021	Best Picture	Dominique Dussault	Nominated	
Canadian Screen Awards	May 20, 2021	Best Director	Pascal Plante	Nominated	
Canadian Screen Awards	May 20, 2021	Best Cinematography	Stéphanie Weber Biron	Nominated	
Prix collégial du cinéma québécois	2021	Best Film	Nadia, Butterfly	Nominated	
Prix Iris	June 6, 2021	Best Film	Dominique Dussault	Nominated	
Prix Iris	June 6, 2021	Best Sound	Stéphane Bergeron, Olivier Calvert, Martyne Morin	Nominated	
Prix Iris	June 6, 2021	Most Successful Film Outside Quebec	Pascal Plante, Dominique Dussault	Nominated	
Vancouver International Film Festival	September 24–October 7, 2020	Best Canadian Feature Film - Special Mention	Pascal Plante	Won	
