= Catherine Legault =

Catherine Legault is a Canadian film editor and director from Quebec. She is most noted for her work on the film Family Demolition (La démolition familiale), for which she won the Prix Iris for Best Editing in a Documentary at the 19th Quebec Cinema Awards in 2017.

As a director, she made her debut in 2019 with Sisters: Dream & Variations (Sœurs: Rêve et variations), a portrait of two Canadian visual artists undertaking a creative trip to Iceland. She followed up in 2024 with Larry (They/Them) (Larry (iel)), a portrait of photographer Laurence Philomène.

== Filmography ==
- Touched by Water - 2006
- Le doigt dans l'oeil - 2007
- Travelling Light: Artists on the Move - 2008
- pilgrIMAGE - 2009
- Des ailes aux talons - 2010
- Hand to Hand - 2010
- Le monde en coulisse - 2011
- A Modern Castle - 2011
- Léo - 2011
- The Avenuers - 2011
- Fair Sex (Les Manèges humains) - 2012
- Mort subite d'un homme-théâtre - 2012
- Floating Body - 2012 (editor and director)
- The Invisible Red Thread - 2012
- Crossing Victoria - 2013
- Au-delà de l'image: Le monde de Michel Lemieux et Victor Pilon - 2014
- Vivre selon Marguerite - 2014
- The Wandering Muse - 2014
- Family Demolition (La démolition familiale) - 2015
- Kurdistan, de gré ou de force - 2015
- Rebels on Pointe - 2017
- My Mother's Letters (Les lettres de ma mère) - 2017
- My Yiddish Papi - 2017
- Exile to the Far West (Éxil au Far West) - 2017
- The Sisters Bedroom (La Chambre des filles) - 2018
- Sisters: Dream & Variations (Sœurs: Rêve et variations) - 2019 (editor and director)
- Fanny: The Right to Rock - 2021
- Chiliheads (Chiliheads, fous de piments forts) - 2021
- Aiguille sous roche - 2021
- Larry (They/Them) (Larry (iel)) - 2024 (editor and director)

== Awards ==
Award	Year	Category	Work	Result	Ref.
Prix Iris	2017	Best Editing in a Documentary	Family Demolition (La démolition familiale)	Won	
Prix Iris	2019	Best Editing in a Documentary	My Mother's Letters (Les lettres de ma mère)	Nominated	
Prix Iris	2022	Best Editing in a Documentary	Fanny: The Right to Rock	Nominated	
