= Olivier Higgins =

Canadian documentary filmmaker

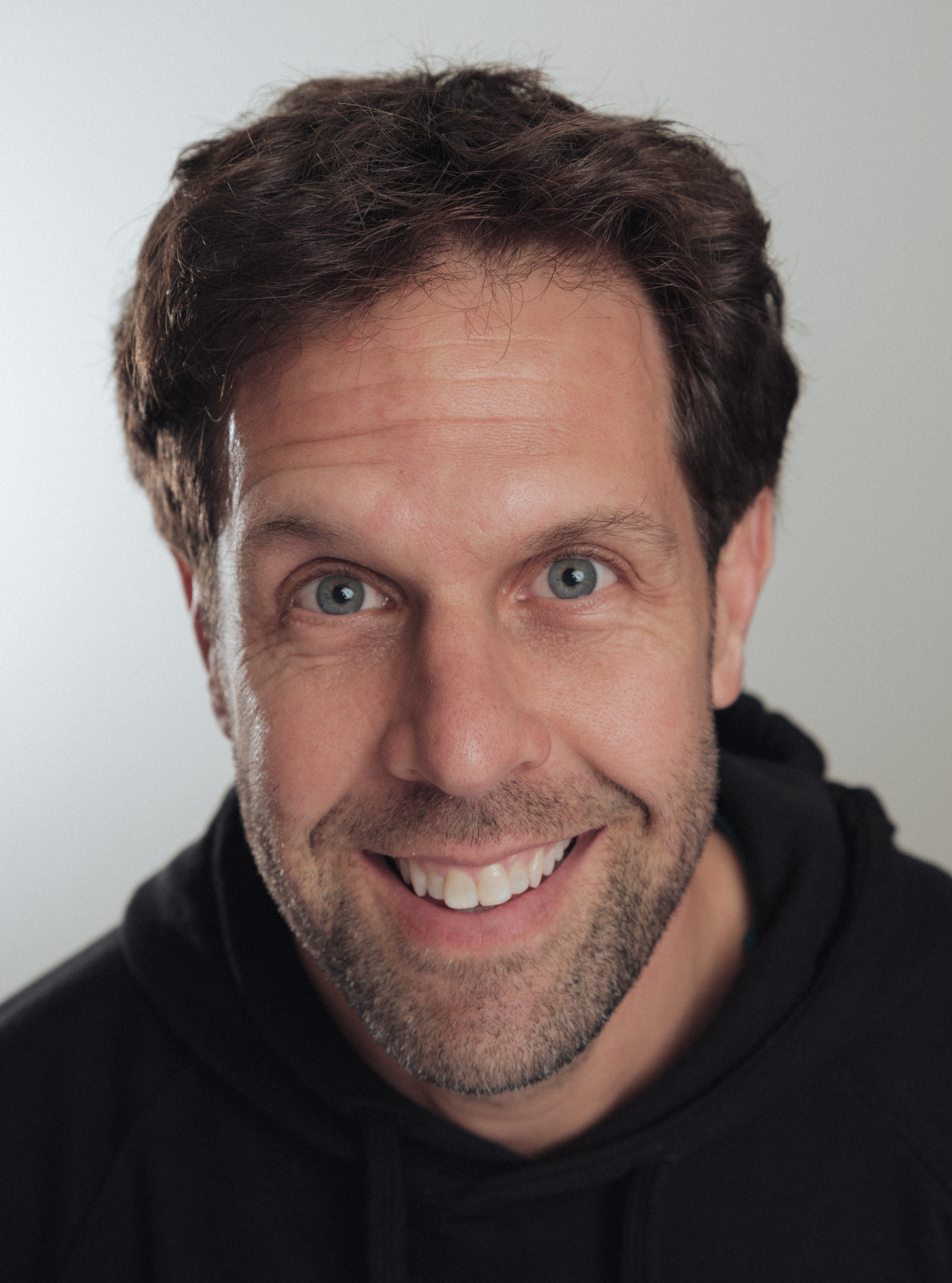
- Olivier Higgins in 2023
- Born: 1979 (age 46–47)
- Occupation: Filmmaker

Olivier Higgins (born 1979) is a Canadian documentary filmmaker from Quebec. The cofounder with his wife Mélanie Carrier of the production studio Mö Films, the duo concentrate primarily on films about the relationships of the world's indigenous peoples with the wider world.

== Early life and education ==
Higgins is a trained biologist and climber.

== Career ==
In 2010, Higgins cofounded the production studio Mö Films with Melanie Carrier. The production studio is based in Quebec City.

The duo's first film Asiemut, chronicling a bicycling trip they took in Asia, was released in 2006.

They followed up in 2011 with the feature documentary Encounters (Rencontre), and the short documentary Ice Philosophy (L'homme de glace).

Their 2013 film Québékoisie was a Jutra Award nominee for Best Documentary Film at the 16th Jutra Awards.

In 2019, they collaborated with photographer Renaud Philippe on Wandering: A Rohingya Story (Errance sans retour), a multimedia museum show and documentary film about the Rohingya crisis in Myanmar. The film debuted in February 2021 and was a Canadian Screen Award nominee for Best Feature Length Documentary at the 9th Canadian Screen Awards, and a Prix Iris nominee for Best Documentary Film at the 23rd Quebec Cinema Awards. Higgins and Philippe were also co-nominated in 2021 for Best Cinematography in a Documentary at the Canadian Screen Awards, and Best Cinematography in a Documentary at the Quebec Cinema Awards; Higgins was also nominated as part of the sound team for Best Sound in a Documentary, and alongside Amélie Labrèche for Best Editing in a Documentary, at the Quebec Cinema Awards.
