= Rosalie Pépin =

Canadian actress from Quebec

Rosalie Pépin is a Canadian actress from Quebec. She is most noted for her performance as Émilie in the film Vacarme, for which she received a Canadian Screen Award nomination for Best Supporting Actress at the 9th Canadian Screen Awards, and a Prix Iris nomination for Revelation of the Year at the 23rd Quebec Cinema Awards.

== Filmography ==
=== Film ===
- Living 100 MPH (Vivre à 100 milles à l'heure) - 2019
- Vacarme - 2020
- Nothing Wrong (Rien de mal) - 2025
- Romin - 2026

=== Television ===
- Ruptures - 2019
- L'Échappée - 2019
- Les Cavaliers - 2022
- Une affaire criminelle- 2022
- Mea Culpa - 2025
