= The Rose Family =

2020 Canadian documentary film

- French: Les Rose
- Directed by: Félix Rose
- Produced by: Marco Frascarelli; Colette Loumède
- Cinematography: Eric Piccoli
- Edited by: Michel Giroux
- Production companies: National Film Board of Canada; Productions Babel
- Release date: August 14, 2020
- Running time: 128 minutes
- Country: Canada
- Language: French

The Rose Family (French: Les Rose) is a Canadian documentary film, directed by Félix Rose and released in 2020. The film centres on the filmmaker's status as the son of Paul Rose, a onetime leader of the Front de libération du Québec who was convicted of kidnapping and murder in the death of Pierre Laporte, and his efforts to come to terms with his complicated familial legacy.

The film was criticized by Lise Ravary of the Montreal Gazette for purportedly romanticizing the FLQ; although Félix Rose denied this, and stated that "the idea was not to minimize what they did, on the contrary, it was to put it in context, to allow us to understand what led to it."

== Plot ==
In October 1970, Minister Pierre Laporte was abducted by individuals belonging to the Front de libération du Québec, sparking an unparalleled crisis in Quebec, Canada. Half a century later, Félix Rose is endeavoring to comprehend the motivations that compelled his father and uncle to engage in these actions.

== Awards ==
The film won the Public Prize at the 23rd Quebec Cinema Awards in 2021.

It was shortlisted for the Prix collégial du cinéma québécois in 2021.
