= Havana, from on High =

2019 Canadian documentary film

- Film poster
- French: Sur les toits Havane
- Spanish: Arriba Habana
- Directed by: Pedro Ruiz
- Produced by: Arantza Maldonado; Pedro Ruiz
- Cinematography: Pedro Ruiz
- Edited by: Pedro Ruiz
- Production company: Faits Divers Média
- Distributed by: K Films Amérique
- Release date: February 22, 2019 (RVQC)
- Running time: 80 minutes
- Country: Canada
- Language: Spanish

Havana, from on High (French: Sur les toits Havane; Spanish: Arriba Habana) is a Canadian documentary film, directed by Pedro Ruiz and released in 2019. The film profiles a group of people in Havana, Cuba who have responded to that city's housing crisis by living on the rooftops of buildings.

The film premiered on February 22, 2019, at the Rendez-vous Québec Cinéma.

Ruiz won the Canadian Screen Award for Best Cinematography in a Documentary at the 8th Canadian Screen Awards in 2020. The film received two Prix Iris nominations at the 22nd Quebec Cinema Awards, for Best Cinematography in a Documentary (Ruiz) and Best Sound in a Documentary (René Portillo).
