= Family Demolition =

- French: La démolition familiale
- Directed by: Patrick Damien-Roy
- Produced by: Bob Moore
- Edited by: Catherine Legault
- Production company: EyeSteelFilm
- Release date: September 19, 2015 (FCVQ)
- Running time: 93 minutes
- Country: Canada
- Language: French

Family Demolition (French: La démolition familiale) is a Canadian documentary film, directed by Patrick Damien-Roy and released in 2015. The film profiles Christopher and Marika, two teenage cousins from Bellechasse, Quebec, who are both involved in the sport of demolition derby.

The film premiered on September 19, 2015, at the Quebec City Film Festival, where it won the Public Award for Best Feature Film and the Prix Jury Cinéphile for Best First Film.

Catherine Legault won the Prix Iris for Best Editing in a Documentary at the 19th Quebec Cinema Awards in 2017.
