= Archipelago (2021 film) =

- French: Archipel
- Directed by: Félix Dufour-Laperrière
- Written by: Félix Dufour-Laperrière
- Produced by: Félix Dufour-Laperrière; Nicolas Dufour-Laperrière
- Narrated by: Florence Blain Mbaye; Mattis Savard-Verhoeven
- Edited by: Félix Dufour-Laperrière
- Music by: Stéphane Lafleur; Christophe Lamarche-Ledoux
- Production company: L'Embuscade Films
- Distributed by: La Distributrices de Films; Miyu Distribution
- Release date: February 4, 2021 (IFFR)
- Running time: 72 minutes
- Country: Canada
- Languages: French; Innu-aimun

Archipelago (French: Archipel) is a 2021 Canadian animated documentary film, directed by Félix Dufour-Laperrière. A poetic essay film that blends diverse styles of animation, the film is a psychogeographic meditation on the islands in the St. Lawrence River, forming a metaphor for Quebec's status as an "uncertain country" defined by the tensions between its status as a province of Canada and the Québécois people's conception of themselves as a distinct nation.

The film is narrated principally by Florence Blain Mbaye and Mattis Savard-Verhoeven, with a shorter narration by Joséphine Bacon of one of her own poems in Innu-aimun. The animation team included Malcolm Sutherland, Philip Lockerby, Jens Hahn, and Eva Cvijanović.

The film premiered in February 2021 at the International Film Festival Rotterdam, and had its Canadian premiere at the Hot Docs Canadian International Documentary Festival in April. It was released commercially on October 19.

== Awards ==
The film won a jury prize at the 2021 Annecy International Animation Film Festival.

It received four Prix Iris nominations at the 24th Quebec Cinema Awards in 2022, for Best Documentary Film, Best Editing in a Documentary (Dufour-Laperrière), Best Sound in a Documentary (Olivier Calvert) and Best Original Music in a Documentary (Stéphane Lafleur, Christophe Lamarche-Ledoux).

It was named the winner of the Prix Luc-Perreault from the Association québécoise des critiques de cinéma at the 2022 Rendez-vous Québec Cinéma.
