= Elric Robichon =

Canadian film and television editor

Elric Robichon is a Canadian film and television editor from Quebec, known for Mille secrets mille dangers, Les enfants du Large, Festin Boréal and Megantic - ceci n'est pas un accident.

He made his debut as a film director with We Will Not Be Silenced, a forthcoming documentary film co-directed with Catherine Hébert.

== Filmography ==
=== Film ===
- Escapades - 2005
- In the Name of the Mother and the Son (Au nom de la mère et du fils) - 2005
- Liberté conditionnelle - 2005
- Being Human (Histoire d'être humain) - 2005
- The Great Resistance (Au pays des colons) - 2007
- Perle - 2007
- Les Petits géants - 2009
- Rwanda, je me souviens - 2009
- The Coca-Cola Case - 2009
- Vapor - 2010
- Remembering the Ashes: Incendies Through Their Eyes (Se souvenir des cendres - Regards sur Incendies) - 2010
- Powder (Poudre) - 2010
- Ina Litovski - 2012
- Rapailler l'homme - 2012
- Pas de trois - 2012
- Kapadokya - 2013
- 100% T-Shirt - 2014
- Last of the Elephant Men - 2014
- Take Me (Prends-moi) - 2014
- Les Mondes de Vincent - 2015
- Night Song (Mobile étoile) - 2016
- Theatre of Life - 2016
- Shadow Men (Nos hommes dans l'ouest) - 2017
- Garrincha - 2017
- A Paradise Too Far (Y'est où le paradis?) - 2017
- Isla Blanca - 2018
- Ziva Postec: The Editor Behind the Film Shoah - 2018 (as cinematographer)
- For Those Who Don't Read Me (À tous ceux qui ne me lisent pas) - 2018
- Destination - 2019
- Angel Peacock - 2019
- The Silence (Le Silence) - 2020
- Rodeo (Rodéo) - 2022
- Programme d'utilisation des patients standardisés - 2022
- Echo to Delta (Écho à Delta) - 2023
- Wild Feast (Festin boréal) - 2023
- Lovely Day (Mille secrets mille dangers) - 2025
- Nesting (Peau à peau) - 2025

=== Television ===
- Le Fric Show - 2006
- Berlin Escape Artists (Berlin - oder: Die Kunst der Flucht) - 2019
- Lac-Mégantic: This Is Not an Accident (Lac-Mégantic : ceci n’est pas un accident) - 2023

== Awards ==
Award	Date of ceremony	Category	Recipient(s)	Result	Ref(s)
Canadian Screen Awards	2016	Best Editing in a Documentary	Last of the Elephant Men	Nominated	
Canadian Screen Awards	2019	Best Editing	For Those Who Don't Read Me (À tous ceux qui ne me lisent pas)	Nominated	
Gémeaux Awards	2006	Best Editing in a Comedy, Variety or Performing Arts Program	Le Fric Show	Won	
Gémeaux Awards	2024	Best Editing in a Documentary or Public Affairs Series	Lac-Mégantic: This Is Not an Accident (Lac-Mégantic : ceci n’est pas un accident)	Won	
Prix Iris	2019	Best Editing	For Those Who Don't Read Me (À tous ceux qui ne me lisent pas)	Nominated	
Prix Iris	2024	Best Editing in a Documentary	Wild Feast (Festin boréal)	Won	
