= Philippe Lefebvre (editor) =

Canadian film editor

Philippe Lefebvre is a Canadian film editor from Quebec. He is most noted for his work on the film Scratches of Life: The Art of Pierre Hébert (Graver l'homme: arrêt sur Pierre Hébert), for which he received a Prix Iris nomination for Best Editing in a Documentary at the 26th Quebec Cinema Awards in 2024.

His other credits have included the films In the Jam Jar, Perséides and Himalia.
