= Ziva Postec: The Editor Behind the Film Shoah =

- French: Ziva Postec : La monteuse derrière le film Shoah
- Directed by: Catherine Hébert
- Written by: Catherine Hébert
- Produced by: Christine Falco
- Starring: Ziva Postec
- Cinematography: Elric Robichon
- Edited by: Annie Jean
- Music by: Ramachandra Borcar
- Production company: Films Camera Oscura
- Distributed by: Les Films du 3 mars
- Release date: November 15, 2018 (RIDM)
- Running time: 92 minutes
- Country: Canada
- Languages: English; French; Hebrew; Czech

Ziva Postec: The Editor Behind the Film Shoah (French: Ziva Postec : La monteuse derrière le film Shoah) is a Canadian documentary film, directed by Catherine Hébert and released in 2018. The film is a portrait of Ziva Postec, an Israeli film editor most noted for her work on the 1985 Holocaust documentary film Shoah.

The film premiered on November 15, 2018, at the Montreal International Documentary Festival, before screening commercially in March 2019.

Annie Jean won the Prix Iris for Best Editing in a Documentary, and the film was a nominee for Best Documentary Film, at the 22nd Quebec Cinema Awards.
