= Wild Feast =

2024 Canadian documentary film

- French: Festin boréal
- Directed by: Robert Morin
- Written by: Robert Morin
- Produced by: Cédric Bourdeau; Louis Laverdière; Stephane Tanguay
- Cinematography: Thomas Leblanc Murray
- Edited by: Elric Robichon
- Production company: Productions Kinesis
- Distributed by: Maison 4:3
- Release date: October 7, 2023 (FNC)
- Running time: 75 minutes
- Country: Canada

Wild Feast (French: Festin boréal) is a Canadian documentary film, directed by Robert Morin and released in 2023. Told without dialogue or narration, the film portrays the cycle of life in the boreal forest through its depiction of animals feeding on the carcass of a dead moose.

The film premiered at the 2023 Festival du nouveau cinéma, before going into commercial release in April 2024.

== Awards ==
Award	Date of ceremony	Category	Recipient(s)	Result	Ref.
Prix Iris	December 8, 2024	Best Documentary	Robert Morin, Cédric Bourdeau, Louis Laverdière, Stéphane Tanguay	Nominated	
Prix Iris	December 8, 2024	Best Editing in a Documentary	Elric Robichon	Won	
Prix collégial du cinéma québécois	2025	Best Film	Robert Morin	Nominated	
