= Québékoisie =

- Directed by: Mélanie Carrier; Olivier Higgins
- Written by: Mélanie Carrier; Olivier Higgins
- Produced by: Mélanie Carrier; Olivier Higgins
- Cinematography: Olivier Higgins
- Edited by: Olivier Higgins; Myriam Verreault
- Production company: Mö Films
- Distributed by: National Film Board of Canada
- Release date: November 20, 2013 (RIDM)
- Running time: 80 minutes
- Country: Canada
- Language: French

Québékoisie is a Canadian documentary film, directed by Mélanie Carrier and Olivier Higgins and released in 2013. The film documents a bicycle trip undertaken by the duo along Quebec Route 138 between Quebec City and Natashquan, to explore the relationship between Quebec's indigenous and non-indigenous populations.

The film premiered in 2013 at the Montreal International Documentary Festival, where it won the Magnus Isaacson Award for socially conscious filmmaking.

The film received a Jutra Award nomination for Best Documentary Film at the 16th Jutra Awards in 2014.
