= Kite Zo A: Leave the Bones =

2022 Canadian documentary film

- French: Kite Zo A: Laisse les os
- Directed by: Kaveh Nabatian
- Written by: Wood-Jerry Gabriel
- Produced by: Kaveh Nabatian; Zach Niles; Joseph Ray
- Starring: Sanba Zao
- Cinematography: Kaveh Nabatian
- Edited by: Kaveh Nabatian
- Music by: Lakou Miziik; Joseph Ray
- Production company: Post-Moderne
- Distributed by: La Distributrice de films
- Release date: October 9, 2022 (FNC)
- Running time: 70 minutes
- Countries: Canada, Haiti
- Language: Haitian Creole

Kite Zo A: Leave the Bones is a Canadian documentary film, directed by Kaveh Nabatian and released in 2022. The film is a sensory portrait of rituals in Haiti.

The film premiered at the 2022 Festival du nouveau cinéma, followed by an international premiere at South by Southwest in 2023.

== Accolades ==
Award	Date of ceremony	Category	Recipient(s)	Result	Ref.
Festival du nouveau cinéma	2022	Prix de la paix (Audience Award)	Kaveh Nabatian	Won	
Reelworld Film Festival	2022	Outstanding Feature Film Cinematographer	Kaveh Nabatian	Won	
Canadian Screen Awards	2024	Best Feature Length Documentary	Kaveh Nabatian	Nominated	
Canadian Screen Awards	2024	Best Cinematography in a Documentary	Kaveh Nabatian	Won	
Prix Iris	December 8, 2024	Best Documentary	Kaveh Nabatian, Joseph Ray, Zach Niles	Won	
Prix Iris	December 8, 2024	Best Cinematography in a Documentary	Kaveh Nabatian	Nominated	
Prix Iris	December 8, 2024	Best Editing in a Documentary	Kaveh Nabatian	Nominated	
Prix Iris	December 8, 2024	Best Original Music in a Documentary	Lakou Mizik, Joseph Ray	Nominated	
Prix Iris	December 8, 2024	Best Sound in a Documentary	Sacha Ratcliffe, Hans Laitres, Joseph Ray, Roudie Rigaud Marcelin	Nominated	
