= The Castle (2020 film) =

- French: Le Château
- Directed by: Denys Desjardins
- Written by: Denys Desjardins
- Produced by: Denys Desjardins
- Starring: Denys Desjardins; Maryse Desjardins; Madeleine Ducharme
- Cinematography: Denys Desjardins; Nicolas Canniccioni; Hong An Nguyen
- Edited by: Denys Desjardins; Annie Jean
- Music by: Simon Bellefleur
- Production company: Films du Centaure
- Distributed by: Films du Centaure; Funfilm Distribution
- Release date: March 4, 2020 (RVQC)
- Running time: 75 minutes
- Country: Canada
- Language: French

The Castle (French: Le Château) is a Canadian documentary film, directed by Denys Desjardins and released in 2020. It profiles his mother Madeleine Ducharme, as she and her family confront the prospect of her having to move out of her independent living seniors' residence and into a managed CHSLD long-term care facility due to her advancing Alzheimer's disease.

The film premiered in March 2020 at the Rendez-vous Québec Cinéma, before its commercial distribution on Vidéotron's Illico platform in May.

Ducharme died of COVID-19 between the time of the theatrical screening and the streaming premiere. In 2022 Desjardins released I Lost My Mom (J'ai placé ma mère), a sequel film which centred more on her final months in long-term care and her death.

== Awards ==
The film received two Prix Iris nominations at the 23rd Quebec Cinema Awards in 2021, for Best Editing in a Documentary (Desjardins, Annie Jean) and Best Sound in a Documentary (Stéphane Barsalou, Claude Beaugrand, Julie Innes).
