= Nut Jobs =

2022 Canadian comedy film

- French: Les Pas d'allure
- Directed by: Alexandre Leblanc
- Written by: Alexandre Leblanc; Julien Grégoire
- Produced by: Alexandre Leblanc
- Starring: Jean-Sébastien Courchesne; Sophie Desmarais
- Cinematography: Vincent Biron; Alexandre Leblanc
- Edited by: Alexandre Leblanc
- Music by: Peter Venne
- Production company: Barbutène
- Release date: July 16, 2022 (Fantasia)
- Running time: 83 minutes
- Country: Canada
- Language: French

Nut Jobs (French: Les Pas d'allure) is a Canadian crime comedy film, directed by Alexandre Leblanc and released in 2022. The film stars Jean-Sébastien Courchesne as Benju, a man who is recounting to his ex-girlfriend Angie (Sophie Desmarais) the events that took place after she got fired for trying to lead a staff coup at the right-wing talk radio station where she worked; in an attempt to win her back, Benju broke into the home of Valérie (Annie St-Pierre), the daughter of station owner Valère (Richard Fréchette), only to end up kidnapped by goons who ultimately revealed to him that the station is actually being used to transmit mind control frequencies to manipulate its listeners.

The cast also includes Benoit Bourbonnais, Yvan Fontaine, Mathieu Bourque, Jean-François Boisvenue, Erin Margurite Carter, Alexis Lefebvre, Élisabeth Sirois, Alain Chevarier, Guillaume Pâquet, Thomas Gionet-Lavigne, Jocelyn Pelletier, Sophie Lecathelinais and Simon Lacroix in supporting roles.

The film premiered at the 2022 Fantasia Film Festival, where it was the winner of the Audience Award for best Quebec film. It entered commercial release in June 2023.
