= Louis Turcotte =

Canadian cinematographer

Louis Turcotte is a Canadian cinematographer from Quebec. He is most noted for his work on the film Scratches of Life: The Art of Pierre Hébert (Graver l'homme: arrêt sur Pierre Hébert), for which he received a Prix Iris nomination for Best Cinematography in a Documentary at the 26th Quebec Cinema Awards in 2024.

His other credits have included the films About Memory and Loss (Notes sur la mémoire et l'oubli) and Until You Die (Jusqu'à ce que tu meures), as well as music videos for Klô Pelgag.
