= Eviction (film) =

2023 Canadian documentary film

- French: Éviction
- Directed by: Mathilde Capone
- Written by: Mathilde Capone
- Produced by: Mathilde Capone
- Cinematography: Ariane Turmel-Chénard
- Edited by: Arnaud Valade
- Music by: Jacob Desjardins; Liana El Amraoui
- Release date: November 23, 2023 (RIDM)
- Running time: 90 minutes
- Country: Canada
- Language: French

Eviction (French: Éviction) is a Canadian documentary film, directed by Mathilde Capone and released in 2023. The film profiles a group of LGBTQ people who have lived in a small apartment building on rue Parthenais in downtown Montreal since 2010, as they cope with the aftermath of being evicted from the building after it is sold to a wealthy family who want to renovate it.

The film premiered at the 2023 Montreal International Documentary Festival, before going into commercial release in 2024.

== Awards ==
Award	Date of ceremony	Category	Recipient(s)	Result	Ref.
Montreal International Documentary Festival	2023	Audience Award	Mathilde Capone	Won	
Prix Iris	December 8, 2024	Best Original Music in a Documentary	Jacob Desjardins, Liana El Amraoui	Nominated	
