= Mort subite d'un homme-théâtre =

- Directed by: Jean-Claude Coulbois
- Written by: Jean-Claude Coulbois
- Produced by: Nicole Hubert
- Cinematography: Jean-Claude Coulbois
- Edited by: Catherine Legault
- Music by: Michel Smith
- Production company: Association coopérative de productions audio-visuelles
- Distributed by: Les Films du 3 mars
- Release date: March 16, 2012
- Running time: 72 minutes
- Country: Canada

Mort subite d'un homme-théâtre (lit. "Sudden Death of a Theatre Man") is a Canadian documentary film, directed by Jean-Claude Coulbois and released in 2011. The film is a profile of Robert Gravel, an actor and playwright who was an influential figure in Quebec's theatre scene until his death in 1996.

The film had originally entered production in the 1990s, with Coulbois conducting initial interviews with Gravel for a documentary that would have portrayed his then-current work, but after Gravel's death Coulbois put the film on hold for over a decade until deciding to return to the film as an exploration of Gravel's enduring impact on theatre in the province. Figures appearing in the film, discussing Gravel's legacy or appearing in archival footage, include Jacques L'Heureux, Alexis Martin, Anne-Marie Provencher, Jean-Pierre Ronfard, Paul Savoie and Guylaine Tremblay.

The film premiered in March 2012.

It was a Jutra Award nominee for Best Documentary Film at the 15th Jutra Awards in 2013.
