= Wintopia =

- Directed by: Mira Burt-Wintonick
- Produced by: Annette Clarke; Bob Moore
- Edited by: Anouk Deschênes
- Music by: David Drury
- Production company: EyeSteelFilm
- Release date: November 2019 (IDFA)
- Running time: 88 minutes
- Country: Canada
- Language: English

Wintopia is a Canadian documentary film, directed by Mira Burt-Wintonick and released in 2019. Originally conceived as an attempt to complete Utopia, an unfinished documentary film her father, Peter Wintonick, was working on at the time of his death in 2013, the film instead evolved into a personal essay on her relationship with him.

The film premiered in November 2019 at the International Documentary Film Festival Amsterdam. It screened at Canadian and international documentary film festivals in 2020, before being released to digital streaming platforms in 2021.

== Awards ==
The film was the winner of the Colin Low Award for best Canadian documentary at the 2020 DOXA Documentary Film Festival.

It received three Prix Iris nominations at the 23rd Quebec Cinema Awards in 2021, for Best Documentary Film, Best Editing in a Documentary (Anouk Deschênes) and Best Sound in a Documentary (Olivier Germain and Marie-Pierre Grenier).
