= Jongué: A Nomad's Journey =

- French: Jongué, carnet nomade
- Directed by: Carlos Ferrand
- Written by: Carlos Ferrand
- Produced by: Carlos Ferrand
- Cinematography: Carlos Ferrand; Sylvestre Guidi
- Edited by: Guillaume Millet
- Music by: Claude Rivest
- Production company: Les Films de L'Autre
- Distributed by: Les films du 3 mars
- Release date: November 18, 2019 (RIDM)
- Running time: 80 minutes
- Country: Canada
- Language: French

Jongué: A Nomad's Journey (French: Jongué, carnet nomade) is a Canadian documentary film, directed by Carlos Ferrand and released in 2019. The film is a portrait of Serge Emmanuel Jongué, a French-Guyanese photographer who immigrated to Quebec in 1975 and became an important yet underrecognized figure in the province's art scene until his death in 2006.

The film premiered in 2019 at the Montreal International Documentary Festival, before going into commercial theatrical distribution in 2020.

The film received two Prix Iris nominations at the 23rd Quebec Cinema Awards in 2021, for Best Sound in a Documentary (Benoît Dame, Catherine Van Der Donckt) and Best Original Music in a Documentary (Claude Rivest).
