= The Eighth Floor =

2023 Canadian documentary film

- French: Le huitième étage, jours de révolte
- Directed by: Pedro Ruiz
- Written by: Pedro Ruiz
- Produced by: Arantza Maldonado; Pedro Ruiz
- Starring: Jacques Lanctôt; Martin Dubreuil
- Cinematography: Deymi D'Atri; Rodrigo Michelangeli
- Edited by: Pedro Ruiz
- Music by: Jérôme Minière
- Production company: Faits Divers Média
- Distributed by: K Films Amérique
- Release date: January 27, 2023
- Running time: 91 minutes
- Country: Canada
- Language: French

The Eighth Floor (French: Le huitième étage, jours de révolte, lit. "The Eighth Floor, Days of Revolt") is a Canadian documentary film, directed by Pedro Ruiz and released in 2023. The film is a portrait of Jacques Lanctôt, a member of the Front de libération du Québec in the 1970s who spent a number of years living in exile in Cuba, before returning to Canada, serving a prison sentence, and then becoming a writer and publisher.

The film includes dramatic re-enactments of various events from Lanctôt's time in Cuba, with Lanctôt portrayed by actor Martin Dubreuil.

The film premiered at the Cinémathèque québécoise on October 27, 2023.

== Awards ==
Award	Date of ceremony	Category	Recipient(s)	Result	Ref.
Prix Iris	December 8, 2024	Best Original Music in a Documentary	Jérôme Minière	Nominated	
