= Helen Doyle (filmmaker) =

Canadian documentary filmmaker

Helen Doyle (born 1950) is a Canadian documentary filmmaker from Quebec. She is most noted as a two-time Jutra/Iris nominee for Best Documentary Film, receiving nods at the 16th Jutra Awards in 2014 for Frameworks: Images of a Changing World (Dans un océan d'images), and at the 26th Quebec Cinema Awards in 2024 for After the Odyssey (Au lendemain de l'odyssée).

== Biography ==
She was a cofounder, with Nicole Giguère and Hélène Roy, of the Vidéo Femmes filmmaking collective in 1973, and she later founded her own production studio, Tatouages de la mémoire, named after one of her own earlier short films.

Helen Doyle cinéaste : La Liberté de voir, a monograph about her work accompanied by a DVD box set of four of her most significant films, was published in 2015.

In 2025, she was named the recipient of the annual Prix Albert-Tessier for her body of work.

== Filmography ==
- 1974 - Femmes de la Super-Francofête
- 1975 - Philosophie de boudoir, codirected with Nicole Giguère
- 1979 - Chaperons rouges, codirected with Hélène Bourgault
- 1979 - Témoignage de Francine, codirected with Hélène Bourgault
- 1979 - Viol: Mythes et réalités, codirected with Nicole Giguère
- 1981 - C'est pas le pays des merveilles, codirected with Nicole Giguère
- 1981 - All in the Same Boat (Juste pour me calmer), codirected with Nicole Giguère
- 1982 - Les Mots... maux du silence
- 1982 - Psychiatry Is Gonna Die (La psychiatrie va mourir), codirected with Christine Gourges and Paul Morin
- 1984 - Trapèze
- 1985 - Scars of the Memory (Les Tatouages de la mémoire)
- 1986 - Le Rêve de voler
- 1988 - Thulée
- 1988 - Danse-Partout
- 1988 - Dames de caméras: Créteil 10
- 1994 - I Love You Real Big (Je t’aime gros, gros, gros)
- 1997 - Le Rendez-vous de Sarajevo
- 1998 - Petites Histoires à se mettre en bouche
- 2002 - The Messengers (Les Messagers)
- 2004 - Soupirs d'âme
- 2008 - Birlyant, a Chechen Story (Birlyant, une histoire tchétchène)
- 2013 - Frameworks: Images of a Changing World (Dans un océan d'images)
- 2016 - L'Artiste dans son for intérieur
- 2016 - L'Atelier des chimères
- 2024 - After the Odyssey (Au lendemain de l'odyssée)
