= Marianne Ploska =

Canadian cinematographer

Marianne Ploska is a Canadian cinematographer. She is most noted for her work on the film Prayer for a Lost Mitten (Prière pour une mitaine perdue), for which she received a Prix Iris nomination for Best Cinematography in a Documentary at the 23rd Quebec Cinema Awards in 2021, and won the Canadian Screen Award for Best Cinematography in a Documentary at the 10th Canadian Screen Awards in 2022.
