= Black Ink on Blue Sky =

- French: Encre noir sur fond d'azur
- Directed by: Félix Dufour-Laperrière
- Produced by: Félix Dufour-Laperrière
- Music by: Charles Côté-Potvin
- Distributed by: Les Films du 3 mars
- Release date: 2003
- Running time: 5 minutes
- Country: Canada

Black Ink on Blue Sky (French: Encre noir sur fond d'azur) is a Canadian animated short film, directed by Félix Dufour-Laperrière and released in 2003. Told without dialogue, the film depicts a man surrounded by a strange and surreal cityscape marked by a lot of dark shadows.

It was a Jutra Award nominee for Best Animated Short Film at the 6th Jutra Awards in 2004.
