= 305 Bellechasse =

- Directed by: Maxime-Claude L'Écuyer
- Written by: Maxime-Claude L'Écuyer
- Produced by: Maxime-Claude L'Écuyer
- Cinematography: Arnaud Dumas; Éric Poliquin; Nelson Villamil
- Edited by: Maxime-Claude L'Écuyer; Louis-Martin Paradis
- Production company: Tulp Films
- Distributed by: H264 Distribution
- Release date: March 26, 2022 (FIFA)
- Running time: 104 minutes
- Country: Canada
- Language: French

305 Bellechasse is a Canadian documentary film, directed by Maxime-Claude L'Écuyer and released in 2022. The film centres on 305 rue de Bellechasse, a onetime pasta factory in Montreal, Quebec which has long since been converted into an artists' studio, but whose tenants are now being renovicted from the building as it has been sold off to a real estate developer who plans to convert the studios into residential condominiums.

The film premiered in March 2022 at the Montreal International Festival of Films on Art, before going into wider commercial release in September.

== Awards ==
Award	Date of ceremony	Category	Recipient(s)	Result	Ref.
Prix Iris	December 10, 2023	Best Sound in a Documentary	Jean-François Sauvé, Martin M. Messier, Bruno Pucella	Nominated	
