= Wandering: A Rohingya Story =

2020 Canadian film directed by Mélanie Carrier and Olivier Higgins

- French: Errance sans retour
- Directed by: Mélanie Carrier; Olivier Higgins
- Written by: Mélanie Carrier; Olivier Higgins; Kala Miya
- Produced by: Mélanie Carrier; Olivier Higgins
- Narrated by: Mohammed Shofi
- Cinematography: Renaud Philippe
- Edited by: Olivier Higgins; Amélie Labrèche
- Music by: Martin Dumais
- Production company: MÖ Films
- Distributed by: Spira
- Release date: September 19, 2020 (FCVQ)
- Running time: 87 minutes
- Country: Canada
- Language: French

Wandering: A Rohingya Story (French: Errance sans retour, lit. "Wandering Without Return") is a Canadian documentary film, directed by Mélanie Carrier and Olivier Higgins and released in 2020. The film is a portrait of the Kutupalong refugee camp in Bangladesh, which houses a large number of refugees from the Rohingya conflict in Myanmar.

Portions of the film were screened in January 2020 as part of Errance sans retour, a multimedia exhibition on the Rohingya crisis at Quebec City's Musée national des beaux-arts du Québec in early 2020, alongside photography by Renaud Philippe. The full film had its premiere at the Quebec City Film Festival on September 19, 2020.

== Awards ==
The film won the Public Prize at FCVQ, and the award for Best Documentary at the Festival international du cinéma francophone en Acadie.

The Musée des beaux-arts exhibition was named the winner of the Société des musées du Québec's Prix Télé-Québec - Coup de coeur du jury award for museum shows.

The film won the Canadian Screen Award for Best Feature Length Documentary at the 9th Canadian Screen Awards in 2021, and was nominated for Best Cinematography in a Documentary (Philippe, Higgins). It also received five Prix Iris nominations at the 23rd Quebec Cinema Awards, for Best Documentary, Best Cinematography in a Documentary (Philippe, Higgins), Best Editing in a Documentary (Higgins, Amélie Labrèche), Best Original Music in a Documentary (Martin Dumais) and Best Sound in a Documentary (Higgins, Pierre-Jules Audet, Luc Boudrias, Kala Miya).
