= Dominique Dussault (producer) =

Canadian film producer

Dominique Dussault is a Canadian film producer from Quebec. She is most noted as producer of the film Nadia, Butterfly, which was a Canadian Screen Award nominee for Best Picture at the 9th Canadian Screen Awards and a Prix Iris nominee for Best Film at the 23rd Quebec Cinema Awards.

A founder of the Nemesis Films studio in 2012 alongside Santiago Menghini and Jonah Malak, Dussault was also the winner of the Canadian Media Producers Association's Kevin Tierney Emerging Producer Award in 2021. She became the sole proprietor of Nemesis in 2024, after Menghini and Malak left the company to concentrate on their directing work.
