= Félix Dufour-Laperrière =

Canadian animator and film director

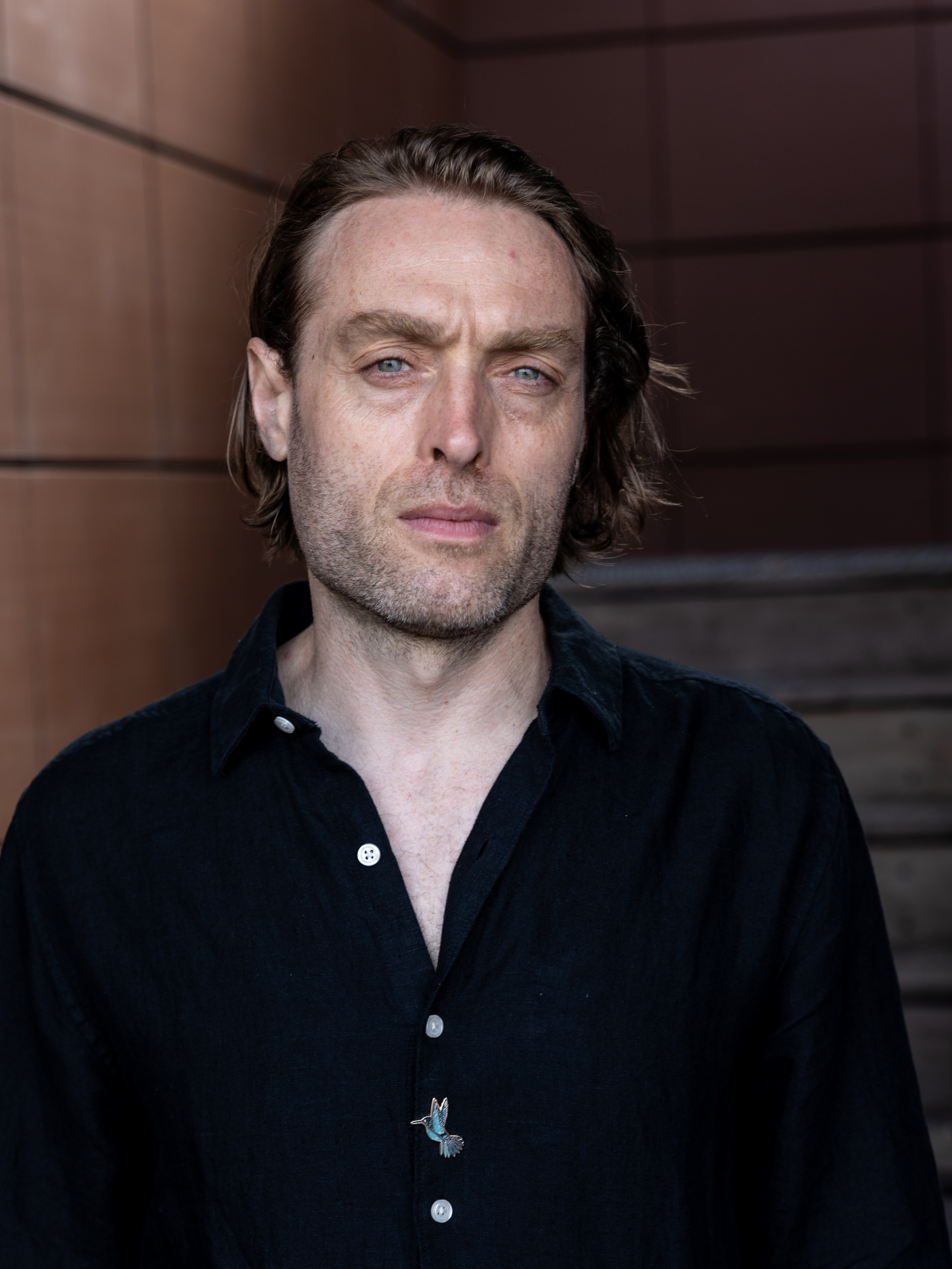
- Dufour in 2025
- Born: 1981 (age 44–45); Chicoutimi, Quebec
- Occupations: film director, animator
- Years active: 2000s-present
- Notable work: Ville Neuve, Archipelago

Félix Dufour-Laperrière (born 1981) is a Canadian animator, film director and screenwriter from Chicoutimi, Quebec. He is most noted for his 2021 film Archipelago (Archipel), which was the winner of the Prix Luc-Perreault from the Association québécoise des critiques de cinéma at the 2022 Rendez-vous Québec Cinéma.

He also received two Prix Iris nominations for the film at the 24th Quebec Cinema Awards in 2022, for Best Documentary Film and Best Editing in a Documentary.

Dufour made a number of short films before releasing his debut feature documentary film, Transatlantic (Transatlantique), in 2014. He was a four-time Jutra Award nominee for Best Animated Short Film, receiving nods at the 6th Jutra Awards in 2004 for Black Ink on Blue Sky (Encre noire sur fond d'azur), the 11th Jutra Awards in 2009 for Rosa Rosa, the 12th Jutra Awards in 2010 for M, and the 16th Jutra Awards in 2014 for The Day Is Listening (Le jour nous écoute).

His narrative feature debut, Ville Neuve, was a nominee for the DGC Discovery Award in 2018.

He is the brother of producer Nicolas Dufour-Laperrière, with whom he cofounded the studio Embuscade Films.

== Filmography ==
| Year | Title | Role | Notes |
|---|---|---|---|
| 2003 | Black Ink on Blue Sky (Encre noire sur fond d'azur) | Director | |
| 2006 | Un, deux, trois, crépuscule | Director, producer, writer | |
| 2006 | Head | Director, producer | codirected with Dominic Étienne Simard |
| 2007 | Variations sur Marilou | Director, producer, writer | |
| 2008 | Rosa Rosa | Director, writer | |
| 2009 | M | Director, producer | |
| 2010 | Strips | Director, producer | |
| 2011 | Canicule | Director, producer | codirector with Marie-Ève Juste |
| 2012 | Parallel North | Director, producer | |
| 2012 | Half Light Dynamics (Dynamique de la pénombre) | Director | codirector with Dominic Étienne Simard |
| 2013 | The Day Is Listening (Le jour nous écoute) | Director, producer, writer | |
| 2014 | Transatlantic (Transatlantique) | Director, producer, writer | |
| 2016 | Red of the Yew Tree (If ou le rouge perdu) | Producer | |
| 2018 | Ville Neuve | Director, writer | |
| 2021 | Archipelago (Archipel) | Director, producer, writer | |
| 2022 | This House (Cette maison) | Producer | |
| 2025 | Death Does Not Exist (La mort n'existe pas) | Director, producer, writer | |
