= Pauline Julien, Intimate and Political =

2018 film by Pascale Ferland

- French: Pauline Julien, intime et politique
- Directed by: Pascale Ferland
- Written by: Pascale Ferland
- Produced by: Johanne Bergeron
- Cinematography: Ernesto Pardo
- Edited by: René Roberge
- Music by: Jean-Phi Goncalves
- Production company: National Film Board of Canada
- Release date: September 15, 2018 (FCVQ)
- Running time: 78 minutes
- Country: Canada
- Language: French

Pauline Julien, Intimate and Political (French: Pauline Julien: intime et politique) is a Canadian documentary film, directed by Pascale Ferland and released in 2018. The film is a portrait of the politically outspoken singer Pauline Julien, including both her career in music and her relationship with poet and politician Gérald Godin.

The film premiered on September 15, 2018, at the Quebec City Film Festival, where it won the Public Award for Best Feature Film. At the 21st Quebec Cinema Awards in 2019, René Roberge won Best Editing in a Documentary, and the film was nominated for Best Documentary Film and Best Sound in a Documentary (Olivier Calvert, Jean Paul Vialard).
