= My Mother's Letters =

2017 Canadian documentary film

- French: Les lettres de ma mère
- Directed by: Serge Giguère
- Written by: Serge Giguère
- Produced by: Sylvie Van Brabant; Amélie Lambert Bouchard
- Cinematography: Serge Giguère; Katerine Giguère
- Edited by: Catherine Legault
- Music by: Bertrand Chénier
- Production company: Production du Rapide Blanc
- Release date: November 17, 2017 (RIDM)
- Running time: 87 minutes
- Country: Canada
- Language: French

My Mother's Letters (French: Les lettres de ma mère) is a Canadian documentary film, directed by Serge Giguère and released in 2017. The film is a social history of life in rural Quebec in the 1940s and 1950s, presented through various letters written by Giguère's mother to her oldest son, Henri, after he became an adult and moved out of the family home.

The film was produced by Giguère's ex-wife, Sylvie Van Brabant, who, despite the end of their marriage, remains a frequent collaborator as producer of most of Giguère's films, and features the participation of their daughter, cinematographer Katerine Giguère.

The film premiered at the 2017 Montreal International Documentary Festival, before going into commercial release in 2018.

The film received two Prix Iris nominations at the 21st Quebec Cinema Awards in 2019, for Best Editing in a Documentary (Catherine Legault) and Best Sound in a Documentary (Claude Beaugrand, Luc Boudrias, Serge Giguère).
