= Jérôme Minière =

French instrumentalist and singer (born 1972)

Jerome Miniere
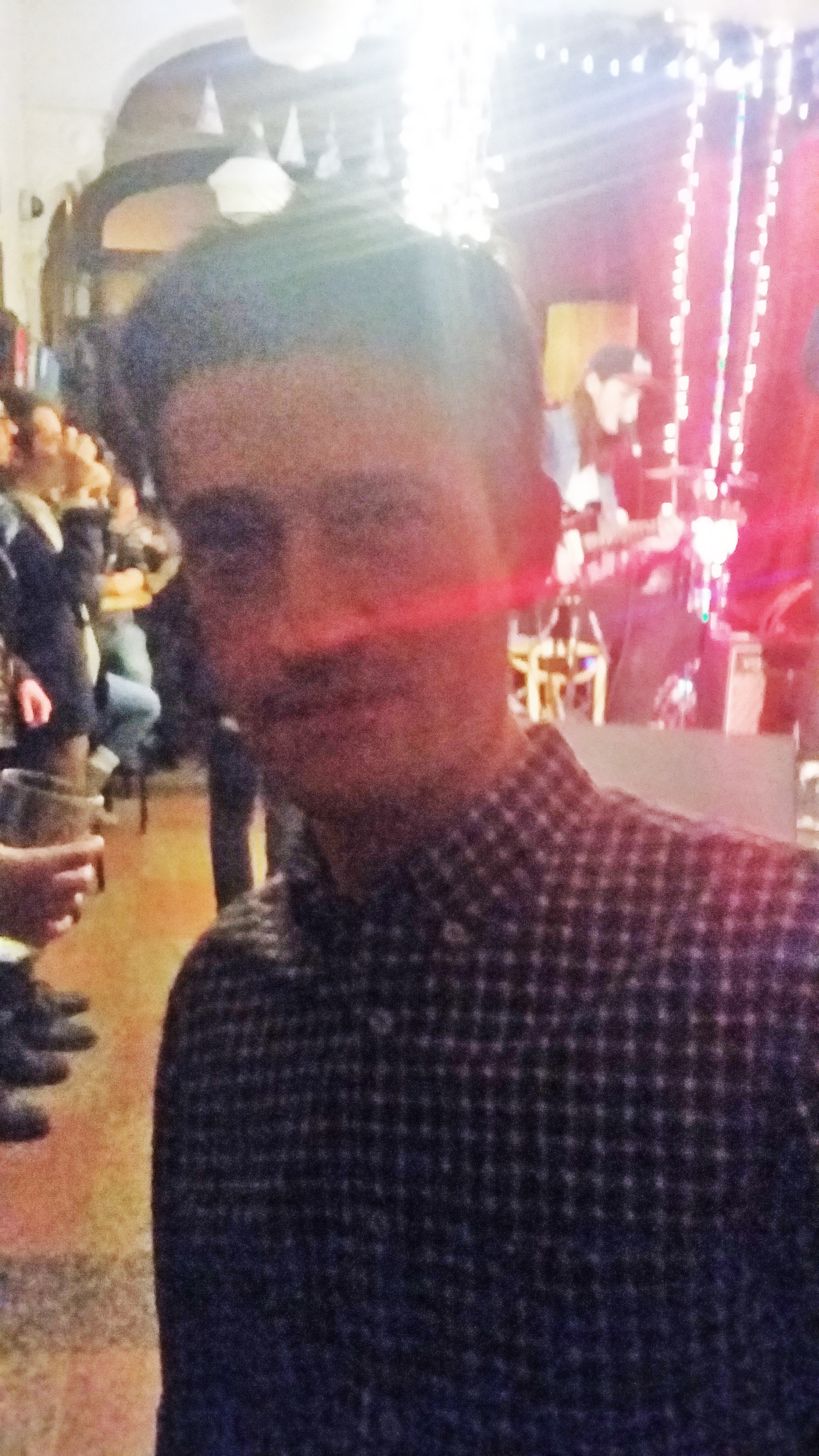

Background information
- Also known as: Herri Kopter
- Born: 1972 (age 53–54); Orléans, France
- Genres: Electronic, Pop music
- Years active: 1996-present
- Labels: Lithium, Virgin

Jérôme Minière is a French instrumentalist and singer who was born in Orléans, France, and moved to Quebec. He is known for his fictional character Herri Kopter. The name of Herri Kopter appears on three of his albums.

In 2024 he received a Prix Iris nomination for Best Original Music in a Documentary at the 26th Quebec Cinema Awards, for his work on the film The Eighth Floor (Le huitième étage, jours de révolte).

== Discography ==
- Monde pour n'importe qui (1997)
- La nuit éclaire le jour qui suit 1 (1998)
- La nuit éclaire le jour qui suit 2 (1998)
- Du Pic au Cœur (2001)
- Jérôme Minière présente Herri Kopter (2001)
- Petit cosmonaute (2002)
- Jérôme Minière chez Herri Kopter (2004)
- Herri Kopter au Grand Théâtre (CD + DVD) (2005)
- Cœurs (2007)
- Le Vrai Le Faux (2010)
- Jérome Minière Danse Avec Herri Kopter (2013)

== Remixes ==
- 2002: Laudanum - Honest (Sometimes)
- 2004: Martin Léon - Perte de Nord
- 2005: Jean-Pierre Ferland - Le petit roi
- 2006: Laudanum - Perfect
- 2007: Pierre Lapointe - Deux par deux rassemblés
- 2012: Alfa Rococo - Électron Libre
- 2013: Montag - Memori

== Achievements of albums ==
- 2006: La fin du monde - Michel Faubert (La Tribu)
- 2011: Ngâbo - Ngâbo (La Tribu)
- 2013: Grenadine - Grenadine (R-Musik)
- 2014: Quatre - Tristan Malavoy (EP) (Audiogram)
- 2015: Bricolages - Domlebo (Domlebo)
