= After the Odyssey =

2024 Canadian documentary film

- French: Au lendemain de l'odyssée
- Directed by: Helen Doyle
- Written by: Helen Doyle
- Produced by: Germain Bonneau; Helen Doyle
- Cinematography: Philippe Lavalette
- Edited by: Annie Jean
- Production company: Tatouages de la Mémoire
- Distributed by: Spira
- Release date: February 9, 2024
- Running time: 85 minutes
- Country: Canada
- Languages: French; Italian

After the Odyssey (French: Au lendemain de l'odyssée) is a Canadian documentary film, directed by Helen Doyle and released in 2024.

The film centres on the illegal human trafficking of immigrants in Italy, primarily women from Nigeria who are sold into sexual slavery; despite the gravity of the film's themes, however, Doyle stressed that the film is ultimately less about the horror of human trafficking itself, and more about the strength, resilience and sisterhood of the women who went through the ordeal and the network of community services that have mobilized to battle the traffickers and help the women.

The film opened theatrically on February 9, 2024.

== Awards ==
Award	Date of ceremony	Category	Recipient(s)	Result	Ref.
Prix Iris	December 8, 2024	Best Documentary	Helen Doyle	Nominated	
Prix Iris	December 8, 2024	Best Cinematography in a Documentary	Philippe Lavalette	Nominated	
Prix Iris	December 8, 2024	Best Editing in a Documentary	Annie Jean	Nominated	
Prix Iris	December 8, 2024	Best Sound in a Documentary	Catherine Van Der Donckt, Bruno Bélanger, Olivier Léger	Nominated	
