= Mélanie Carrier =

Canadian cineast and documentary filmmaker

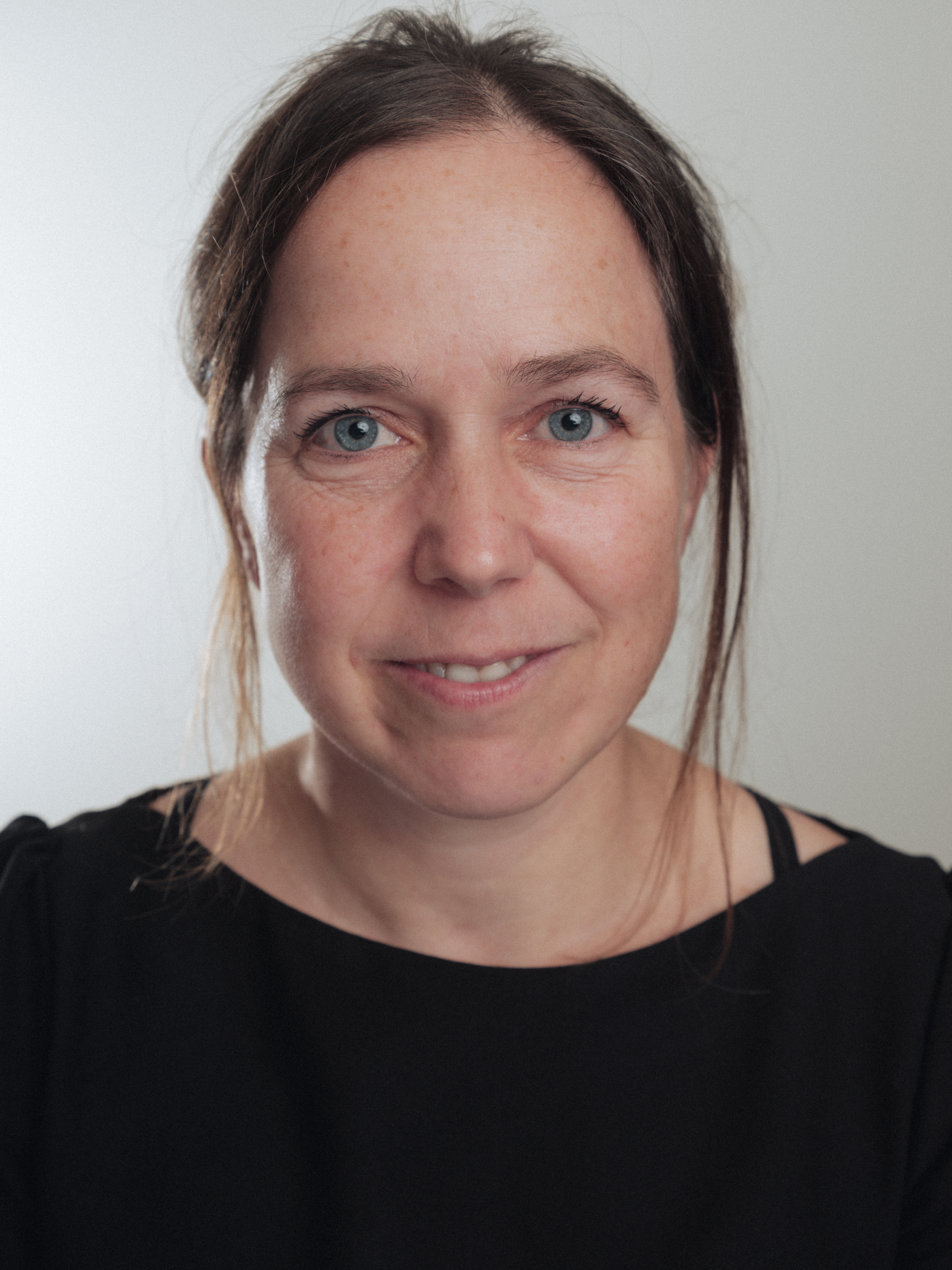
Mélanie Carrier in 2023

Mélanie Carrier (born 1979) is a Canadian documentary filmmaker from Quebec. The cofounder with her husband Olivier Higgins of the production studio Mö Films, the duo concentrate primarily on films about the relationships of the world's indigenous peoples with the wider world.

The duo's first film Asiemut, chronicling a bicycling trip they took in Asia, was released in 2006.

They followed up in 2011 with the feature documentary Encounters (Rencontre), and the short documentary Ice Philosophy (L'homme de glace).

Their 2013 film Québékoisie was a Jutra Award nominee for Best Documentary Film at the 16th Jutra Awards.

In 2019 they collaborated with photographer Renaud Philippe on Wandering: A Rohingya Story (Errance sans retour), a multimedia museum show and documentary film about the Rohingya crisis in Myanmar. The film was a Canadian Screen Award nominee for Best Feature Length Documentary at the 9th Canadian Screen Awards, and a Prix Iris nominee for Best Documentary Film at the 23rd Quebec Cinema Awards.

Their documentary Deep Inside Humanity (Ce que le monde porte en soi) is in production for release in 2021 or 2022.
