= The 108 Journey =

- Directed by: Hugo Rozon; Mathieu Perrault Lapierre
- Written by: Hugo Rozon
- Starring: Hugo Rozon
- Cinematography: Mathieu Perrault Lapierre
- Edited by: Mathieu Perrault Lapierre
- Music by: Mathieu Perrault Lapierre
- Production company: Generat1on
- Distributed by: Encore Television
- Release date: January 28, 2021
- Running time: 59 minutes
- Country: Canada
- Languages: English; French

The 108 Journey is a 2021 Canadian documentary film directed by Hugo Rozon and Mathieu Perrault Lapierre. The film centres on a trip to India and Nepal which Rozon took in 2019 as a journey of self-reflection following his diagnosis with bipolar disorder.

The film's title is a reference to the spiritual significance of the number 108 in Eastern religious traditions such as Hinduism and Buddhism.

The film premiered on January 28, 2021, on a dedicated online streaming platform, and was screened theatrically at various film festivals.

Mathieu Perrault Lapierre received two Prix Iris nominations at the 23rd Quebec Cinema Awards, for Best Cinematography in a Documentary and Best Original Music in a Documentary.

Rozon subsequently created Comme des papillons, a documentary series in which eight Quebec celebrities talk about their own mental health journeys.
