= Scratches of Life: The Art of Pierre Hébert =

2024 Canadian documentary film

- French: Graver l'homme: arrêt sur Pierre Hébert
- Directed by: Loïc Darses
- Written by: Loïc Darses
- Produced by: Marc Bertrand
- Starring: Pierre Hébert
- Cinematography: Louis Turcotte
- Edited by: Philippe Lefebvre
- Music by: Marc-Antoine Barbier
- Production company: National Film Board of Canada
- Release date: May 11, 2024 (Sommets du cinéma d'animation)
- Running time: 75 minutes
- Country: Canada
- Language: French

Scratches of Life: The Art of Pierre Hébert (French: Graver l'homme: arrêt sur Pierre Hébert) is a Canadian documentary film, directed by Loïc Darses and released in 2024. The film is a portrait of the life and career of animator Pierre Hébert, tracing his importance as an innovator of scratch animation.

The film premiered at the 2024 Sommets du cinéma d'animation, before opening commercially at the Cinémathèque québécoise. It was also screened in the Annecy Classics section of the 2024 Annecy International Animation Film Festival,

== Awards ==
Award	Date of ceremony	Category	Recipient(s)	Result	Ref.
Prix Iris	December 8, 2024	Best Documentary	Loïc Darses, Marc Bertrand	Nominated	
Prix Iris	December 8, 2024	Best Cinematography in a Documentary	Louis Turcotte	Nominated	
Prix Iris	December 8, 2024	Best Editing in a Documentary	Philippe Lefebvre	Nominated	
Prix Iris	December 8, 2024	Best Sound in a Documentary	Ilyaa Ghafouri, Shelley Craig, Thomas Sédillot	Nominated	
