= Prayer for a Lost Mitten =

- French: Prière pour une mitaine perdue
- Directed by: Jean-François Lesage
- Written by: Jean-François Lesage
- Produced by: Jean-François Lesage
- Cinematography: Marianne Ploska
- Edited by: Mathieu Bouchard-Malo; Ariane Pétel-Despots
- Music by: Tom Brunt
- Production company: Les Films de l'Autre
- Distributed by: Les Films du 3 Mars
- Release date: May 28, 2020 (Hot Docs)
- Running time: 79 minutes
- Country: Canada
- Language: French

Prayer for a Lost Mitten (French: Prière pour une mitaine perdue) is a Canadian documentary film, directed by Jean-François Lesage and released in 2020. The film centres on the lost and found office of the Montreal Metro system.

The film premiered as part of the 2020 Hot Docs Canadian International Documentary Festival. Due to the COVID-19 pandemic in Canada it was not screened theatrically, but premiered as part of the festival's online streaming component. It was named the winner of the festival's Best Canadian Feature Documentary award.

== Awards ==
The film received three Prix Iris nominations at the 23rd Quebec Cinema Awards in 2021, for Best Cinematography in a Documentary (Marianne Ploska), Best Original Music in a Documentary (Tom Brunt) and Best Sound in a Documentary (Marie-Andrée Cormier, Olivier Germain, Marie-Pierre Grenier). In 2022, the film was shortlisted for the Prix collégial du cinéma québécois.

The film received a Canadian Screen Award nomination for Best Feature Length Documentary, and Ploska won the award for Best Cinematography in a Documentary, at the 10th Canadian Screen Awards in 2022.
