= Frameworks: Images of a Changing World =

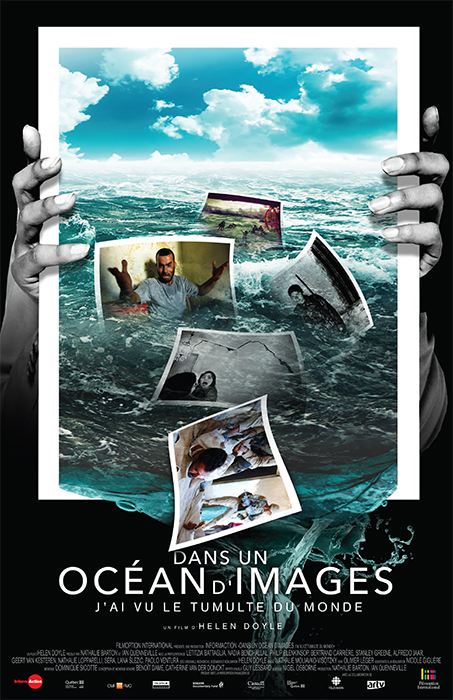
- Film poster
- French: Dans un océan d'images
- Directed by: Helen Doyle
- Written by: Helen Doyle
- Produced by: Nathalie Barton; Ian Quenneville
- Cinematography: Nathalie Moliavko-Visotzky
- Edited by: Dominique Sicotte
- Music by: Nigel Osborne
- Production company: InformAction
- Distributed by: Filmoption International
- Release date: March 16, 2013 (FIFA)
- Running time: 91 minutes
- Country: Canada
- Languages: English; French

Frameworks: Images of a Changing World (French: Dans un océan d'images) is a Canadian documentary film, directed by Helen Doyle and released in 2013. The film interviews various photographers and photojournalists to explore the ways in which contemporary technology, such as smartphone cameras and social networking platforms on the internet, have led to modern culture becoming so bombarded with photographic and video images that even the most shocking images of war are losing their power and impact.

The film premiered at the 2013 International Festival of Films on Art, before going into commercial release in September.

The film received a Prix Iris nomination for Best Documentary Film at the 16th Jutra Awards in 2014.
