= The Battle of Saint-Léonard =

- French: La bataille de Saint-Léonard
- Directed by: Félix Rose
- Written by: Félix Rose
- Produced by: Karine Dubois
- Cinematography: Priscilla Piccoli
- Edited by: Michel Giroux
- Music by: Marc Gravel
- Production company: Picbois Productions
- Distributed by: Maison 4:3
- Release date: October 11, 2024
- Running time: 108 minutes
- Country: Canada
- Language: French

The Battle of Saint-Léonard (French: La bataille de Saint-Léonard) is a Canadian documentary film, directed by Félix Rose and released in 2024. The film profiles the late 1960s political controversy in Saint-Léonard, Quebec, when Italian Canadians and pure laine francophone Quebecers found themselves in deep conflict over education reform proposals that would have eliminated bilingual Roman Catholic schools and provided all Catholic education exclusively in French.

The film premiered theatrically on October 11, 2024.

== Accolades ==
Award	Date of ceremony	Category	Recipient	Result	Ref.
Quebec Cinema Awards	2025	Best Documentary	Félix Rose, Karine Dubois	Nominated	
Quebec Cinema Awards	2025	Best Editing in a Documentary	Michel Giroux	Nominated	
Quebec Cinema Awards	2025	Best Original Music in a Documentary	Marc Gravel	Nominated	
Quebec Cinema Awards	2025	Best Sound in a Documentary	Simon Gervais, Laurence Turcotte-Fraser, Nicolas Dallaire	Nominated	
