= The Forbidden Reel =

- Film poster
- Directed by: Ariel Nasr
- Written by: Ariel Nasr
- Produced by: Katherine Baulu; Sergeo Kirby; Ariel Nasr
- Cinematography: Pablo Alvarez-Mesa; Duraid Munajim
- Edited by: Annie Jean
- Music by: Olivier Alary; Johannes Malfatti
- Production company: National Film Board of Canada
- Release date: November 25, 2019 (IDFA)
- Running time: 119 minutes
- Country: Canada
- Language: English

The Forbidden Reel is a 2019 Canadian documentary film, directed by Ariel Nasr. The film profiles the cinema of Afghanistan through a history of the Afghan Film Organization.

The film premiered in 2019 at the International Documentary Film Festival Amsterdam. It had its Canadian premiere at the 2020 Hot Docs Canadian International Documentary Festival, where it was named one of five winners of the festival's Rogers Audience Award, alongside the films The Walrus and the Whistleblower, 9/11 Kids, First We Eat and There's No Place Like This Place, Anyplace.

The film received two Prix Iris nominations at the 23rd Quebec Cinema Awards in 2021, for Best Documentary and Best Editing in a Documentary (Annie Jean).
