= Amélie Labrèche =

Canadian film editor

Amélie Labrèche is a Canadian film editor from Montreal, Quebec. She is most noted as co-winner with Olivier Higgins of the Prix Iris for Best Editing in a Documentary at the 23rd Quebec Cinema Awards in 2021, for their work on the film Wandering: A Rohingya Story (Errance sans retour).

== Filmography ==
=== Film ===
- Love - 2011
- Périmés - 2012
- The Siege (Le Siège) - 2013
- An Xmas Memory - 2013
- Where Atilla Passes (Là où Atilla passe...) - 2015
- A Done Deal (Une formalité) - 2016
- Where Do Cats Go After 9 Lives? - 2017
- Afterwards (Après coup) - 2017
- Tadoussac - 2017
- Return to Park Ex - 2017
- March Fool (Poisson de mars) - 2018
- Happy Face - 2018
- Jaeborn by Numbers (Jaeborn numéro par numéro) - 2019
- Kuessipan - 2019
- Busy Tuesday (Gros mardi) - 2019
- Laughter (Le Rire) - 2020
- Nadia, Butterfly - 2020
- Wandering: A Rohingya Story (Errance sans retour) - 2020
- Mon Oncle Patof - 2021
- The Inhuman (L'Inhumain) - 2021
- Noemie Says Yes (Noémie dit oui) - 2022
- You Can Live Forever - 2022
- Pacific Bell - 2022
- Nu - 2022
- Gaby's Hills (Gaby les collines) - 2023
- Richelieu - 2023
- Dead Cat (Chat mort) - 2023
- Hunting Daze (Jour de chasse) - 2024
- Bonjour Tristesse - 2024
- You Are Not Alone (Vous n'êtes pas seuls) - 2024
- 100 Nights of Hero - 2025
- The Train (Le Train) - 2025

=== Television ===
- Documentary Lens - 2006
- Studios, Lofts & Jam Spaces - 2017
- Amours d'occasion - 2020
- Faits divers - 2020
- Avant le crash - 2022

== Awards ==
Award	Date of ceremony	Category	Recipient(s)	Result	Ref(s)
Canadian Cinema Editors	2020	Best Editing in a Feature Film	Kuessipan with Sophie Leblond, Myriam Verreault	Won	
Canadian Cinema Editors	2020	Best Editing in a Short Film	Jaeborn by Numbers (Jaeborn numéro par numéro)	Nominated	
Canadian Cinema Editors	2021	Best Editing in a Feature Film	Laughter (Le Rire)	Won	
Canadian Cinema Editors	2021	Best Editing in a Feature Film	Nadia, Butterfly	Nominated	
Canadian Cinema Editors	2022	Best Editing in a Documentary, Short Form	Mon Oncle Patof	Won	
Canadian Cinema Editors	2023	Best Editing in a Feature Film	Noemie Says Yes (Noémie dit oui)	Nominated	
Canadian Cinema Editors	2023	Best Editing in a Short Film	Nu	Nominated	
Canadian Cinema Editors	2024	Best Editing in a Short Film	Dead Cat (Chat mort)	Nominated	
Prix Iris	2021	Best Editing in a Documentary	Wandering: A Rohingya Story (Errance sans retour)	Won	
Prix Iris	2024	Best Editing	Richelieu	Nominated	
