= Boulder Adventure Film Festival =

Coordinates: 40°1′9.1″N 105°16′38.0″W

Adventure Film Festival
- Location: Boulder, Colorado, United States
- Language: International
- Website: http://www.adventurefilm.org

The Adventure Film Festival is an international film festival in Boulder, Colorado. Started in 2004 by local climber Jonny Copp who was killed in an avalanche in 2009 while on an expedition in China, the festival predominantly screens films on adventure, environmental activism, and the outdoors.
