= Lawrence Côté-Collins =

Canadian film director and screenwriter

Lawrence Côté-Collins is a Canadian film director and screenwriter from Quebec, whose debut feature film Split (Écartée) premiered in 2016.

Associated with the Kino Montréal collective, she debuted in 2009 with the short film No Pain, No Gain (Pas de pain, pas de gain). She was subsequently a director and cinematographer on other short films and music videos, and ran for political office as an Option nationale candidate for Laval-des-Rapides in the 2012 Quebec general election.

Split premiered at the 2016 Fantasia Film Festival, where it received an honorable mention from the jury for the Barry Convex Award for best Canadian film.

Her second feature film, Bungalow, premiered on the film festival circuit in 2022 before going into commercial release in 2023.

In 2024 she released the documentary film Billy. The film was a profile of Billy Poulin, an actor who had appeared in No Pain, No Gain prior to exhibiting symptoms of schizophrenia that would eventually lead to his conviction and imprisonment for murder. The film premiered at the Visions du Réel documentary film festival in 2024, and later won a number of awards including the Student Jury Award at the 2024 Montreal International Documentary Festival, and a special jury citation in the documentary competition at the 2025 Seattle International Film Festival.

She is bisexual.

== Filmography ==
- No Pain, No Gain (Pas de pain, pas de gain) - 2009
- Crudités - 2009
- Fuck That - 2011
- Score - 2011
- Split (Écartée) - 2016
- VHS, mon amour - 2018
- Bungalow - 2022
- Billy - 2024
