= DocAgora =

Think tank and open webplex

DocAgora was a non-profit international thinktank and open webplex that claimed to stimulate discussion about new forms, new platforms and new ways of financing documentary media.

DocAgora hosted events at festivals worldwide, including the International Documentary Film Festival Amsterdam, HotDocs, SilverDocs, Sunny Side of the Doc, and the Australian International Documentary Conference.

The DocAgora Webplex was an open database of resources for the documentary community.

As of 2016 it appears to have ceased operations.
