= Pedro Ruiz (filmmaker) =

Venezuelan Canadian filmmaker

Pedro Ruiz is a Venezuelan Canadian filmmaker based in Montreal, Quebec. He is most noted for his 2019 film Havana, from on High (Sur les toits Havane), for which he won the Canadian Screen Award for Best Cinematography in a Documentary at the 8th Canadian Screen Awards, and received a Prix Iris nomination for Best Cinematography in a Documentary at the 22nd Quebec Cinema Awards.

In 2023 he released The Eighth Floor (Le huitième étage, jours de révolte).

== Filmography ==
- Animal tropical à Montréal - 2007
- The Gentle Drifting of a Haitian Child (La dérive douce d'un enfant de Petit-Goâve) - 2009
- Philémon chante Habana - 2012
- Havana, from on High (Sur les toits Havane) - 2019
- The Eighth Floor (Le huitième étage, jours de révolte) - 2023
