= Vacarme =

2020 Canadian film directed by Neegan Trudel

- Film poster
- Directed by: Neegan Trudel
- Written by: Jonathan Lemire; Neegan Trudel
- Produced by: Line Sander Egede
- Starring: Rosalie Pépin; Sophie Desmarais
- Cinematography: Philippe Roy
- Edited by: Marianne Langston
- Music by: Maxime Fortin
- Production company: TAK Films
- Distributed by: Axia Films
- Release date: November 10, 2020 (Cinemania)
- Running time: 77 minutes
- Country: Canada
- Language: French

Vacarme is a 2020 Canadian drama film, directed by Neegan Trudel. The film stars Rosalie Pépin as Émilie, a 13 year old girl who is placed in a group home by Quebec's child protective services after a conflict with her mother Karine (Sophie Desmarais).

The film premiered in November 2020 at the Cinemania film festival.

The film received two Canadian Screen Award nominations at the 9th Canadian Screen Awards in 2021, for Best Actress (Pépin) and the John Dunning Best First Feature Award.
