= Larry (They/Them) =

- French: Larry (iel)
- Directed by: Catherine Legault
- Written by: Catherine Legault
- Produced by: Isabelle Phaneuf-Cyr
- Starring: Laurence Philomène
- Cinematography: Catherine Legault; Claire Sanford; Samuel Trudelle-Gendron
- Edited by: Catherine Legault
- Music by: Scout the Wise; Eric Shaw
- Production company: Concerto Films
- Distributed by: Les Films du 3 mars
- Release date: September 20, 2024 (CIFF)
- Running time: 103 minutes
- Country: Canada
- Language: English

Larry (They/Them) (French: Larry (iel)) is a Canadian documentary film, directed by Catherine Legault and released in 2024. The film is a portrait of Laurence Philomène, a non-binary artist from Montreal, Quebec, as they embark on both their gender transition and the artistic process that went into the creation of Puberty, their photography book about the transition.

The film premiered at the 2024 Calgary International Film Festival. It was later screened at festivals including the 2024 Montreal International Documentary Festival, the 2025 Slamdance Film Festival, and the 2025 Canadian Film Festival, before going into commercial release in April 2025.
