= Annie Jean =

Canadian film editor

Annie Jean is a Canadian film editor from Quebec, who won the Prix Iris for Best Editing in a Documentary at the 22nd Quebec Cinema Awards in 2020 for her work on the film Ziva Postec: The Editor Behind the Film Shoah (Ziva Postec : La monteuse derrière le film Shoah).

She was also nominated in the same category at the 23rd Quebec Cinema Awards in 2021 for both The Castle (Le Château) and The Forbidden Reel, and at the 24th Quebec Cinema Awards in 2024 for After the Odyssey (Au lendemain de l'odyssée).
