= Catherine Hébert =

Canadian documentary filmmaker

Catherine Hébert is a Canadian documentary filmmaker from Quebec.

After graduating with degrees in communications from the Université du Québec à Montréal and journalism from the Université Laval, Hébert travelled to Africa, where she began her documentary filmmaking career.

She first became widely known for The Other Side of the Country (De l'autre côté du pays), which premiered at the 2007 Montreal International Documentary Festival. It was the winner of the Prix du Public at RIDM,. and received a Prix Jutra nomination for Best Documentary Film at the 11th Jutra Awards in 2009.

In 2011, her film Notes on a Road Less Taken (Carnets d'un grand détour) won the Grand Prize for Canadian documentaries at RIDM.

Ziva Postec: The Editor Behind the Film Shoah (Ziva Postec: La monteuse derrière le film Shoah) premiered at RIDM in 2018, and received a Prix Iris nomination for Best Documentary film at the 22nd Quebec Cinema Awards in 2020.

Hébert and Elric Robichon co-directed the forthcoming documentary film We Will Not Be Silenced (Que le silence ne l'emporte pas), a profile of writers in exile who use their art as a tool of activism and resistance.

== Filmography ==
- Tea at the Embassy (Thé à l’ambassade) – 2003
- Des mangues pour Charlotte – 2004
- Voici l'homme – 2005
- Le visage que j’avais – 2006
- The Other Side of the Country (De l'autre côté du pays) – 2007
- La longue route de Julienne – 2008
- Notes on a Road Less Taken (Carnets d'un grand détour) – 2011
- Yesterday in Nyassan (Hier à Nyassan) – 2016
- Ziva Postec: The Editor Behind the Film Shoah (Ziva Postec: La monteuse derrière le film Shoah) – 2018
- We Will Not Be Silenced (Que le silence ne l'emporte pas) – TBA
