= Mira Burt-Wintonick =

Canadian filmmaker

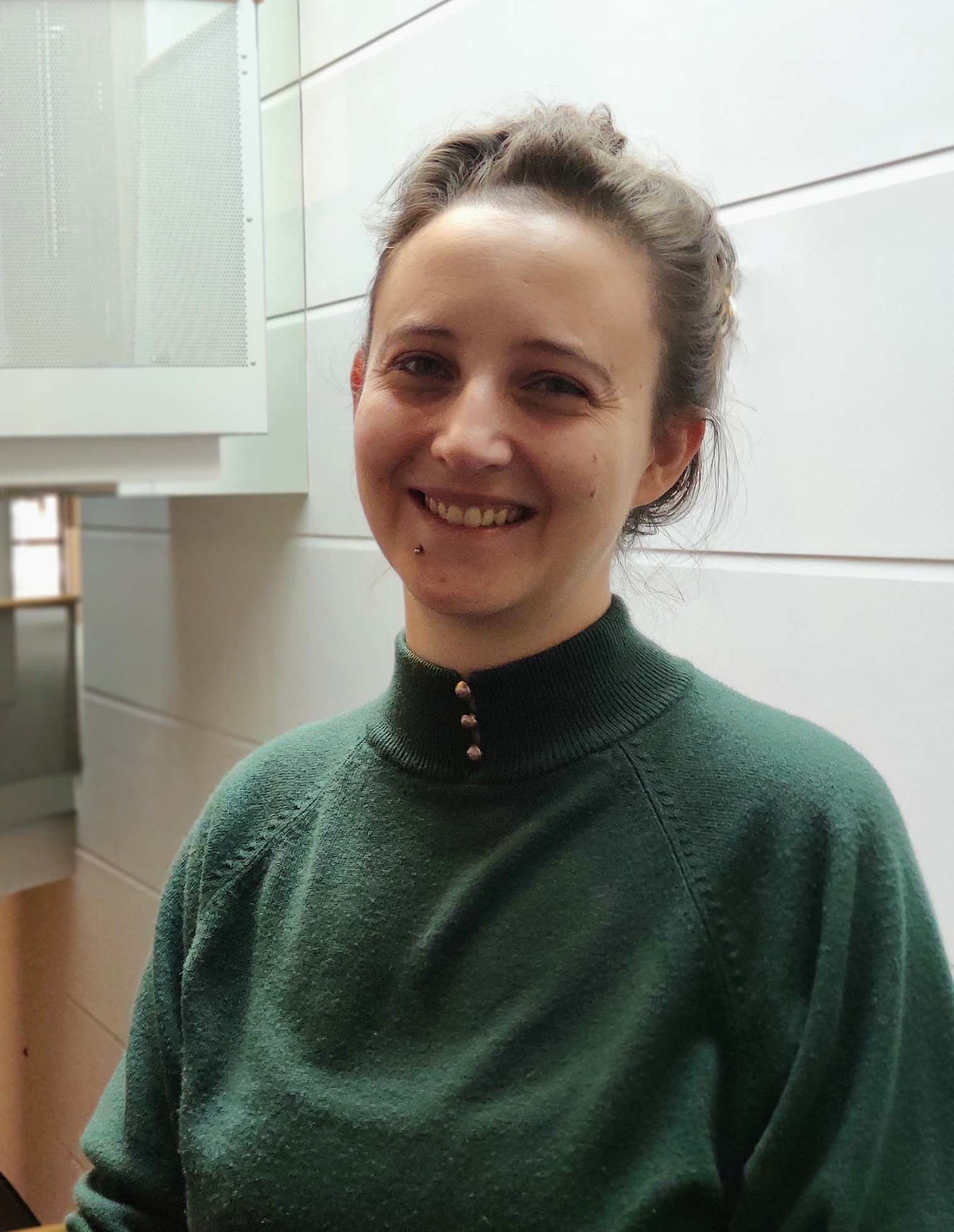
- Mira Burt-Wintonick at the International Documentary Film Festival Amsterdam 2019
- Born: July 8, 1984 (age 42)
- Occupation: Radio producer/Filmmaker
- Parent: Peter Wintonick

Mira Burt-Wintonick (born July 8, 1984) is a Canadian radio and film producer best known for her audio pieces and work on the CBC radio program WireTap. Trained as a classical musician, Burt-Wintonick pursued a Communications degree from Concordia University in Montreal where she currently resides. Notably, in 2006 Burt-Wintonick was chosen Best New Artist at the Third Coast Festival for her radio essay Muriel's Message. Daughter of Canadian documentary film maker Peter Wintonick, Burt-Wintonick co-produced the road-trip documentary PilgrIMAGE with her father which was a selection at the International Documentary Film Festival Amsterdam in 2008.

== Published works ==
- 2005: Bitch, Rage, and Roar: video short
- 2006: Muriel's Message: radio documentary
- 2008: PilgrIMAGE: video documentary
- 2019: Wintopia: video documentary.

== Awards ==
- 2006 Third Coast Festival Best New Artist Award: Muriel's Message
