= Neegan Trudel =

Canadian film director and screenwriter

Frédérick Neegan Siouï Trudel is a Canadian film director and screenwriter from Quebec, whose debut feature film Vacarme was a shortlisted finalist for the John Dunning Best First Feature Award at the 9th Canadian Screen Awards in 2021.

A member of the Wendat Nation, Trudel studied visual effects and animation at the Gnomon School of Visual Effects and the Université Laval, and began working in the film industry as a lighting artist and digital compositor. His visual effects credits include work on the films The Little Prince, Ballerina, Office Christmas Party, Rings and Stronger.

He subsequently directed the short films Guanzillum (2017) and Ashen Sleep (2017) before making Vacarme.

In 2020, following the release of Vacarme, Trudel joined the production firm Cayenne Médias to direct and produce indigenous-themed projects.
