= Alexandre Leblanc =

Alexandre Leblanc is a Canadian film editor and director, whose debut feature film Nut Jobs (Les Pas d'allure) was released in 2022. The film premiered at the 2022 Fantasia Film Festival, where it was the winner of the Audience Award for best Quebec film.

He previously directed the short films Losing It (Surménage), Maudits maux dits, The Sunday Robbers (Les voleurs du dimanche) and Intolérable.

His credits as an editor have included the films The Sower (Le Semeur), Prank, Barbarians of the Bay (Les Barbares de La Malbaie) and Young Juliette (Jeune Juliette). He was a Prix Iris nominee for Best Editing in a Documentary at the 21st Quebec Cinema Awards in 2019 for his work on the film A Sister's Song.
