= Billy (2024 film) =

2024 Canadian documentary film

- Directed by: Lawrence Côté-Collins
- Written by: Lawrence Côté-Collins
- Produced by: Lawrence Côté-Collins; Vuk Stojanovic
- Starring: Billy Poulin; Lawrence Côté-Collins
- Cinematography: Lawrence Côté-Collins; Sophie Lanctôt; Benoît Rodrigue; Billy Poulin; Benoît Poulin; Josiane Lapointe; Pascal Brazeau; Sylvia Demarais
- Edited by: Josiane Lapointe; Alexandre Leblanc; Lawrence Côté-Collins
- Music by: Martin Roy; Luc Sicard
- Production company: LC2 Productions
- Distributed by: Vital Distribution
- Release date: April 2024 (Visions du Réel)
- Running time: 107 minutes
- Country: Canada
- Language: French

Billy is a Canadian documentary film, directed by Lawrence Côté-Collins and released in 2024.

The film profiles Billy Poulin, an actor Côté-Collins had worked with in her debut short film No Pain, No Gain (Pas de pain, pas de gain) before cutting off contact with him in the early 2010s when he physically assaulted her, and who later exhibited symptoms of schizophrenia before being convicted and imprisoned for committing murder in 2013. It centres in part on their efforts to reconcile and heal their relationship following the assault incident, as well as highlighting excerpts from Poulin's own amateur filmmaking during the early decline in his mental health.

== Distribution ==
The film premiered at the Visions du Réel documentary film festival in 2024, and subsequently screened at other film festivals.

It received a special commercial screening in Poulin's hometown of Matane, Quebec, in January 2025, before going into general commercial release in May 2025.

== Awards ==
The film won the Student Jury Award at the 2024 Montreal International Documentary Festival, and a special jury citation in the documentary competition at the 2025 Seattle International Film Festival.
