= Prix Iris for Best Animated Short Film =

Annual Canadian film award

The Prix Iris for Best Animated Short Film (French: Prix Iris du meilleur film d'animation) is an annual film award presented by Québec Cinéma as part of its Prix Iris program, to honour the year's best animated short film made within the cinema of Quebec.

== Statistics ==
Marc Bertrand received the most nominations, eleven, and won three awards. Bertrand became only the second person to receive four nominations in the same category in 2017. Patrick Bouchard received the most awards, four, from five nominations.

Seven short films nominated for this award were also nominated for the Academy Award for Best Animated Short Film: The Old Man and the Sea (which won both the Oscar and Prix Iris), My Grandmother Ironed the King's Shirts, When the Day Breaks, Nibbles, Madame Tutli-Putli, Sunday (Dimanche) and Blind Vaysha (Vaysha l'aveugle).

Despite not having their own category at the Prix Iris, eleven full length animated features were nominated and won awards:

- At the 16th Jutra Awards, The Legend of Sarila (La légende de Sarila) was nominated for two awards: Best Original Music and Best Sound. It became the first animated film to receive any nominations in the history of the awards.
- At the 18th Quebec Cinema Awards, Snowtime! (La guerre des tuques 3D) was nominated for two awards: Best Art Direction and Best Sound. It won the latter and the Billet d'or, becoming the first animated film to win an award.
- At the 20th Quebec Cinema Awards, Ballerina was nominated for two awards: Most Successful Film Outside Quebec and the Public Prize.
- At the 21st Quebec Cinema Awards, Racetime (La course des tuques) was nominated for two awards: Most Successful Film Outside Quebec and the Public Prize.
- At the 22nd Quebec Cinema Awards, Ville Neuve was nominated for Best Sound.
- At the 23rd Quebec Cinema Awards, Felix and the Treasure of Morgäa (Félix et le trésor de Morgäa) was nominated for Best First Film. At the 24th Quebec Cinema Awards, it received an additional nomination for Most Successful Film Outside Quebec.
- At the 24th Quebec Cinema Awards, Archipelago (Archipel) was nominated for four awards: Best Documentary, Best Editing in a Documentary, Best Sound in a Documentary and Best Original Music in a Documentary, winning the latter.
- At the 25th Quebec Cinema Awards, Katak: The Brave Beluga (Katak, le brave Béluga) was nominated for two awards: Most Successful Film Outside Quebec and the Public Prize.
- Also at the 25th Quebec Cinema Awards, Dounia and the Princess of Aleppo (Dounia et la princesse d'Alep) was nominated Most Successful Film Outside Quebec. This marked the first time that two full length animated features were nominated in the same category.
- At the 26th Quebec Cinema Awards, When Adam Changes (Adam change lentement) was nominated Best First Film.
- At the 27th Quebec Cinema Awards, Hola Frida! was nominated Most Successful Film Outside Quebec.

== 2000s ==
Year	Film	Filmmaker(s)	Ref
2000; 2nd Jutra Awards
2000; 2nd Jutra Awards	The Old Man and the Sea	Aleksandr Petrov	
2000; 2nd Jutra Awards	Cuckoo, Mr. Edgar! (Coucou, Monsieur Edgar!)	Pierre M. Trudeau	
2000; 2nd Jutra Awards	My Grandmother Ironed the King's Shirts	Torill Kove	
2000; 2nd Jutra Awards	When the Day Breaks	Wendy Tilby, Amanda Forbis	
2001; 3rd Jutra Awards
2001; 3rd Jutra Awards	The Hat (Le chapeau)	Michèle Cournoyer	
2001; 3rd Jutra Awards	The Boy Who Saw the Iceberg (Le garçon qui a vu l'iceberg)	Paul Driessen	
2001; 3rd Jutra Awards	Deadpan	Rick Raxlen	
2001; 3rd Jutra Awards	From the Big Bang to Tuesday Morning (Du big bang à mardi matin)	Claude Cloutier	
2002; 4th Jutra Awards
2002; 4th Jutra Awards	Black Soul (Âme noire)	Martine Chartrand	
2002; 4th Jutra Awards	Glasses	Brian Duchscherer	
2002; 4th Jutra Awards	A Hunting Lesson (Une leçon de chasse)	Jacques Drouin	
2003; 5th Jutra Awards
2003; 5th Jutra Awards	The Brainwashers (Les ramoneurs cérébraux)	Patrick Bouchard	
2003; 5th Jutra Awards	Antagonia	Nicolas Brault	
2003; 5th Jutra Awards	Flux	Christopher Hinton	
2003; 5th Jutra Awards	The Hungry Squid	John Weldon	
2004; 6th Jutra Awards
2004; 6th Jutra Awards	Blue Like a Gunshot (Bleu comme un coup de feu)	Masoud Raouf	
2004; 6th Jutra Awards	Black Ink on Blue Sky (Encre noire sur fond d'azur)	Félix Dufour-Laperrière	
2004; 6th Jutra Awards	Islet (Îlot)	Nicolas Brault	
2004; 6th Jutra Awards	Two Eastern Hair Lines	Steven Woloshen	
2005; 7th Jutra Awards
2005; 7th Jutra Awards	Nibbles	Christopher Hinton	
2005; 7th Jutra Awards	The Accordion (Accordéon)	Michèle Cournoyer	
2005; 7th Jutra Awards	Imprints (Empreintes)	Jacques Drouin	
2005; 7th Jutra Awards	Welcome to Kentucky	Craig Welch	
2006; 8th Jutra Awards
2006; 8th Jutra Awards	Dehors novembre	Patrick Bouchard	
2006; 8th Jutra Awards	cNote	Christopher Hinton	
2006; 8th Jutra Awards	The Curse of the Voodoo Child	Steven Woloshen	
2006; 8th Jutra Awards	Tower Bawher	Theodore Ushev	
2007; 9th Jutra Awards
2007; 9th Jutra Awards	McLaren's Negatives	Marie-Josée Saint-Pierre	
2007; 9th Jutra Awards	Here and There (Ici par ici)	Diane Obomsawin	
2007; 9th Jutra Awards	Jaime Lo, Small and Shy (Jaime Lo, petite et timide)	Lillian Chan	
2007; 9th Jutra Awards	The Man Who Waited (L'homme qui atttendait)	Theodore Ushev	
2008; 10th Jutra Awards
2008; 10th Jutra Awards	Sleeping Betty (Isabelle au bois dormant)	Claude Cloutier	
2008; 10th Jutra Awards	Madame Tutli-Putli	Chris Lavis, Maciek Szczerbowski	
2008; 10th Jutra Awards	Subservience (Révérence)	Patrick Bouchard	
2008; 10th Jutra Awards	The Tourists	Malcolm Sutherland	
2009; 11th Jutra Awards
2009; 11th Jutra Awards	The Necktie (Le nœud cravate)	Jean-François Lévesque	
2009; 11th Jutra Awards	Drux Flux	Theodore Ushev	
2009; 11th Jutra Awards	Garbage Angels (Les anges déchets)	Pierre M. Trudeau	
2009; 11th Jutra Awards	Rosa Rosa	Félix Dufour-Laperrière	

== 2010s ==
Year	Film	Filmmaker(s)	Ref
2010; 12th Jutra Awards
2010; 12th Jutra Awards	Robes of War (Robe de Guerre)	Michèle Cournoyer	
2010; 12th Jutra Awards	The Drawer and the Crow (Le tiroir et le corbeau)	Frédérick Tremblay	
2010; 12th Jutra Awards	M	Félix Dufour-Laperrière	
2010; 12th Jutra Awards	Oko	Alain Fournier	
2010; 12th Jutra Awards	Playtime	Steven Woloshen	
2011; 13th Jutra Awards
2011; 13th Jutra Awards	Lipsett Diaries (Les journaux de Lipsett)	Théodore Ushev	
2011; 13th Jutra Awards	Higglety Pigglety Pop! or There Must Be More to Life	Chris Lavis, Maciek Szczerbowski	
2011; 13th Jutra Awards	The Festival (La fête)	Malcolm Sutherland	
2011; 13th Jutra Awards	Mamori	Karl Lemieux	
2011; 13th Jutra Awards	Un vortex dans face	Joël Vaudreuil	
2012; 14th Jutra Awards
2012; 14th Jutra Awards	Sunday (Dimanche)	Patrick Doyon	
2012; 14th Jutra Awards	Of Events (D'aléas)	Mathieu Tremblay	
2012; 14th Jutra Awards	Paula	Dominic-Étienne Simard	
2012; 14th Jutra Awards	Rivière au Tonnerre	Pierre Hébert	
2012; 14th Jutra Awards	White Strawberry (Blanche fraise)	Frédérick Tremblay	
2013; 15th Jutra Awards
2013; 15th Jutra Awards	Bydlo	Patrick Bouchard	
2013; 15th Jutra Awards	Here and the Great Elsewhere (Le grand ailleurs et le petit ici)	Michèle Lemieux	
2013; 15th Jutra Awards	Joda	Théodore Ushev	
2013; 15th Jutra Awards	Kaspar	Diane Obomsawin	
2013; 15th Jutra Awards	Triptych 2 (Triptyque 2)	Pierre Hébert	
2014; 16th Jutra Awards
2014; 16th Jutra Awards	The River's Lazy Flow (Le courant faible de la rivière)	Joël Vaudreuil, David Pierrat	
2014; 16th Jutra Awards	The Day Is Listening (Le jour nous écoute)	Félix Dufour-Laperrière, Julie Roy	
2014; 16th Jutra Awards	The End of Pinky (La fin de Pinky)	Claire Blanchet, Michael Fukushima	
2014; 16th Jutra Awards	Gloria Victoria	Theodore Ushev, Marc Bertrand	
2014; 16th Jutra Awards	Wandering (Errance)	Éléonore Goldberg	
2015; 17th Jutra Awards
2015; 17th Jutra Awards	Jutra	Marie-Josée Saint-Pierre, Marc Bertrand, René Chénier	
2015; 17th Jutra Awards	Lucky and Finnegan	Davide Di Saro	
2015; 17th Jutra Awards	Migration	Mark Lomond, Johanne Ste-Marie	
2015; 17th Jutra Awards	No Fish Where to Go (Nul poisson où aller)	Nicola Lemay, Janice Nadeau, Marc Bertrand	
2015; 17th Jutra Awards	Soif	Michèle Cournoyer, René Chénier, Marcel Jean, Galilé Marion-Gauvin	
2016; 18th Quebec Cinema Awards
2016; 18th Quebec Cinema Awards	Carface (Autos Portraits)	Claude Cloutier, Julie Roy	
2016; 18th Quebec Cinema Awards	All the Rage	Alexandra Lemay, Maral Mohammadian	
2016; 18th Quebec Cinema Awards	My Heart Attack	Sheldon Cohen, Jelena Popovic, Marcy Page	
2016; 18th Quebec Cinema Awards	The Sleepwalker (Sonámbulo)	Theodore Ushev, Dominique Noujeim, Galilé Marion-Gauvin	
2016; 18th Quebec Cinema Awards	Squame	Nicolas Brault	
2017; 19th Quebec Cinema Awards
2017; 19th Quebec Cinema Awards	Blind Vaysha (Vaysha l'aveugle)	Theodore Ushev, Marc Bertrand	
2017; 19th Quebec Cinema Awards	Casino	Steven Woloshen	
2017; 19th Quebec Cinema Awards	I Like Girls (J'aime les filles)	Diane Obomsawin, Marc Bertrand	
2017; 19th Quebec Cinema Awards	Mamie	Janice Nadeau, Marc Bertrand, Julie Roy, Corinne Destombes	
2017; 19th Quebec Cinema Awards	Oscar	Marie-Josée Saint-Pierre, Marc Bertrand, Jocelyne Perrier	
2018; 20th Quebec Cinema Awards
2018; 20th Quebec Cinema Awards	Dolls Don't Cry (Toutes les poupées ne pleurent pas)	Frédérick Tremblay, Pierre Lesage	
2018; 20th Quebec Cinema Awards	Hedgehog's Home (La maison du hérisson)	Eva Cvijanović, Jelena Popović, Vanja Andrijević	
2018; 20th Quebec Cinema Awards	Me, Baby & the Alligator	Jean Faucher, Bob Olivier	
2018; 20th Quebec Cinema Awards	Sweet Childhood (La pureté de l'enfance)	Zviane, Julie Roy, Marc Bertrand, Ron Dyens	
2018; 20th Quebec Cinema Awards	With or Without Sun (Avec ou sans soleil)	Jean-Guillaume Bastien	
2019; 21st Quebec Cinema Awards
2019; 21st Quebec Cinema Awards	The Subject (Le sujet)	Patrick Bouchard, Julie Roy	
2019; 21st Quebec Cinema Awards	Bone Mother	Dale Hayward, Sylvie Trouvé, Jelena Popović	
2019; 21st Quebec Cinema Awards	But One Bird Sang Not (Mais un oiseau ne chantait pas)	Pierre Hébert	
2019; 21st Quebec Cinema Awards	Not Your Panda	Tigris Alt Sakda	
2019; 21st Quebec Cinema Awards	The Sisters' Bedroom (La chambre des filles)	Claire Brognez	

== 2020s ==
Year	Film	Filmmaker(s)	Ref
2020; 22nd Quebec Cinema Awards
2020; 22nd Quebec Cinema Awards	The Physics of Sorrow (Physique de la tristesse)	Theodore Ushev, Marc Bertrand	
2020; 22nd Quebec Cinema Awards	Clothing (Les vêtements)	Caroline Blais	
2020; 22nd Quebec Cinema Awards	The Great Malaise (Le mal du siècle)	Catherine Lepage, Marc Bertrand	
2020; 22nd Quebec Cinema Awards	Organic	Steven Woloshen	
2020; 22nd Quebec Cinema Awards	The Procession (Le cortège)	Pascal Blanchet, Rodolphe Saint-Gelais, Julie Roy	
2021; 23rd Quebec Cinema Awards
2021; 23rd Quebec Cinema Awards	Hibiscus Season (La saison des hibiscus)	Éléonore Goldberg, Nicolas Dufour-Laperrière	
2021; 23rd Quebec Cinema Awards	Barcelona Burning (Barcelona de Foc)	Theodore Ushev	
2021; 23rd Quebec Cinema Awards	The Fourfold	Alisi Telengut	
2021; 23rd Quebec Cinema Awards	I, Barnabé (Moi, Barnabé)	Jean-François Lévesque, Julie Roy	
2021; 23rd Quebec Cinema Awards	In the Shadow of the Pines	Anne Koizumi, Sahar Yousefi	
2022; 24th Quebec Cinema Awards
2022; 24th Quebec Cinema Awards	The Displeasure (La grogne)	Alisi Telengut, Dominique Dussault	
2022; 24th Quebec Cinema Awards	Bad Seeds (Mauvaises herbes)	Claude Cloutier, Galilé Marion-Gauvin, Élise Labbé	
2022; 24th Quebec Cinema Awards	Boobs (Lolos)	Marie Valade	
2022; 24th Quebec Cinema Awards	No Title (Pas de titre)	Alexandra Myotte, Jean-Sébastien Hamel	
2022; 24th Quebec Cinema Awards	They Dance With Their Heads (Ils dansent avec leurs têtes)	Thomas Corriveau	
2023; 25th Quebec Cinema Awards
2023; 25th Quebec Cinema Awards	Madeleine	Raquel Sancinetti	
2023; 25th Quebec Cinema Awards	Harvey	Janice Nadeau, Reginald de Guillebon, Pierre Méloni, Marc Bertrand, Christine Noël, Julie Roy	
2023; 25th Quebec Cinema Awards	Marie. Eduardo. Sophie.	Thomas Corriveau	
2023; 25th Quebec Cinema Awards	A Night for the Dogs	Max Woodward, Guillaume Dubois, Camille Lequenne	
2023; 25th Quebec Cinema Awards	Triangle of Darkness (Triangle noir)	Marie-Noëlle Moreau Robidas, Nicolas Dufour-Laperrière	
2024; 26th Quebec Cinema Awards
2024; 26th Quebec Cinema Awards	A Crab in the Pool (Un trou dans la poitrine)	Jean-Sébastien Hamel, Alexandra Myotte	
2024; 26th Quebec Cinema Awards	Entropic Memory (Mémoire entropique)	Nicolas Brault	
2024; 26th Quebec Cinema Awards	Families' Albums (Albums de familles)	Moïa Jobin-Paré	
2024; 26th Quebec Cinema Awards	Return to Hairy Hill (Retour à Hairy Hill)	Daniel Gies, Emily Paige	
2024; 26th Quebec Cinema Awards	Wild Flowers (Les Fleurs sauvages)	Rodolphe Saint-Gelais, Thierry Sirois, David Francke-Robitaille, Isabelle Grignon-Francke	
2025; 27th Quebec Cinema Awards
2025; 27th Quebec Cinema Awards	Maybe Elephants	Torill Kove, Lise Fearnley, Tonje Skar Reiersen, Maral Mohammadian	
2025; 27th Quebec Cinema Awards	Ibuka, Justice	Justice Rutikara, Mylène Augustin	
2025; 27th Quebec Cinema Awards	The Little Ancestor (Le Petit ancêtre)	Alexa Tremblay-Francœur, Stéphanie Gagné	
2025; 27th Quebec Cinema Awards	Out for Ice Cream (Crème à glace)	Rachel Samson, Raquel Sancinetti, Félix Dufour-Laperrière	
2025; 27th Quebec Cinema Awards	The Painting (Le Tableau)	Michèle Lemieux, Christine Noël, Julie Roy	

== Multiple wins and nominations ==
=== Multiple wins ===
Wins	Filmmaker
4	Patrick Bouchard
3	Marc Bertrand
3	Theodore Ushev
2	Claude Cloutier
2	Michèle Cournoyer
2	Julie Roy
2	Marie-Josée Saint-Pierre

=== Three or more nominations ===
Nominations	Filmmaker
11	Marc Bertrand
10	Theodore Ushev
9	Julie Roy
5	Patrick Bouchard
5	Félix Dufour-Laperrière
5	Steven Woloshen
4	Nicolas Brault
4	Claude Cloutier
4	Michèle Cournoyer
3	Pierre Hébert
3	Christopher Hinton
3	Galilé Marion-Gauvin
3	Janice Nadeau
3	Diane Obomsawin
3	Jelena Popović
3	Marie-Josée Saint-Pierre
3	Frédérick Tremblay

== See also ==
- Canadian Screen Award for Best Animated Short
