= Galilé Marion-Gauvin =

Canadian film producer

Galilé Marion-Gauvin is a Canadian film producer from Quebec, who was the founder of the Unité centrale film studio. He is most noted as producer of the 2018 film Genesis (Genèse), which was a Canadian Screen Award nominee for Best Motion Picture at the 7th Canadian Screen Awards, and a Prix Iris nominee for Best Film at the 21st Quebec Cinema Awards.

== Filmography ==
- Montreal Stories, 1912 - 2005
- Montreal Stories, 1971 - 2006
- Le petit oiseau va sortir - 2006
- Montreal Stories, 1944 - 2008
- The Man Who Slept (L'Homme qui dort) - 2009
- Snow Hides the Shade of Fig Trees (La neige cache l'ombre des figuiers) - 2009
- Impossible - 2010
- D'Aurore - 2011
- Des femmes libres - 2012
- The Washing Machine (La Machine à laver) - 2012
- Arwad - 2013
- Le Puits - 2013
- Xavier, Mireille et la tournure des choses - 2013
- The Blue Marble (La bille bleue) - 2014
- Soif - 2014
- Davaï - 2015
- The Demons (Les Démons) - 2015
- The Sleepwalker (Sonámbulo) - 2015
- The Voice (La voce) - 2015
- Copenhague: A Love Story - 2016
- Louise by the Shore (Louise en hiver) - 2016
- Sigismond Imageless - 2016
- The Far Shore (Dérive) - 2018
- Genesis (Genèse) - 2018
- Ville Neuve - 2018
- Savage State (L'État sauvage) - 2019
- Bad Seeds (Mauvaises herbes) - 2021
- Blind Willow, Sleeping Woman (Saules aveugles, femme endormie)- 2022
- Chasing Birds - 2022
- Richelieu - 2023, executive producer
- Who by Fire (Comme le feu) - 2024
- Rituals Under a Scarlet Sky (Rituels sous un ciel écarlate) - 2024

== Awards ==
Award	Year	Category	Work	Result	Ref(s)
Canadian Screen Awards	2015	Best Animated Short	Soif (with René Chénier, Michèle Cournoyer, Marcel Jean)	Nominated	
Canadian Screen Awards	2019	Best Motion Picture	Genesis (Genèse)	Nominated	
European Film Awards	2017	Best Animated Feature Film	Louise by the Shore (Louise en hiver)	Nominated	
Prix Iris	2015	Best Animated Short Film	Soif (with René Chénier, Michèle Cournoyer, Marcel Jean)	Nominated	
Prix Iris	2016	Best Film	The Demons (Les Démons) (with Philippe Lesage)	Nominated	
Prix Iris	2016	Best Animated Short Film	The Sleepwalker (Sonámbulo) (with Theodore Ushev, Dominique Noujeim	Nominated	
Prix Iris	2017	Best Live Action Short Film	The Voice (La voce) (with David Uloth, Dominique Noujeim)	Nominated	
Prix Iris	2019	Best Film	Genesis (Genèse)	Nominated	
Prix Iris	2020	Most Successful Film Outside Quebec	Genesis (Genèse)	Nominated	
Prix Iris	2022	Best Animated Short Film	Bad Seeds (Mauvaises herbes) (with Claude Cloutier, Élise Labbé)	Nominated	
Prix Iris	2025	Best Film	Who by Fire (Comme le feu) with Thomas Ordonneau	Nominated	
Prix Iris	2025	Best Live Action Short Film	Rituals Under a Scarlet Sky (Rituels sous un ciel écarlate) (with Dominique Chila, Samer Najari)	Nominated	
