= Through the Mist =

- French: Dédé, à travers les brumes
- Directed by: Jean-Philippe Duval
- Written by: Jean-Philippe Duval
- Produced by: Roger Frappier; Luc Vandal
- Starring: Sébastien Ricard; Joseph Mesiano; Yan Rompré; Dimitri Storoge
- Cinematography: Jean-Pierre Trudel
- Edited by: Alain Baril
- Music by: Les Colocs; Éloi Painchaud
- Production companies: Max Films Productions; Zone3
- Distributed by: TVA Films
- Release date: March 13, 2009
- Running time: 139 minutes
- Country: Canada
- Language: French

Through the Mist (French: Dédé, à travers les brumes) is a Canadian drama film, directed by Jean-Philippe Duval and released in 2009. A biopic of rock musician Dédé Fortin of Les Colocs, the film stars Sébastien Ricard as Fortin.

The film's cast also included Joseph Mesiano as Mike Sawatzky, Yan Rompré as Serge Robert, Dimitri Storoge as Patrick Esposito Di Napoli and Bénédicte Décary as Nicole Bélanger, as well as Claudia Ferri, Mélissa Désormeaux-Poulin, Isabelle Brouillette and Louis Saia. However, Bélanger criticized the film as inaccurate.

== Awards ==
The film received ten Prix Jutra nominations in 2010, including Best Film. It won the awards for Best Actor (Ricard), Best Art Direction (David Pelletier), Best Costume Design (Judy Jonker) and Best Music.
