= André Vanderbiest =

Belgian-Canadian musician and bassist

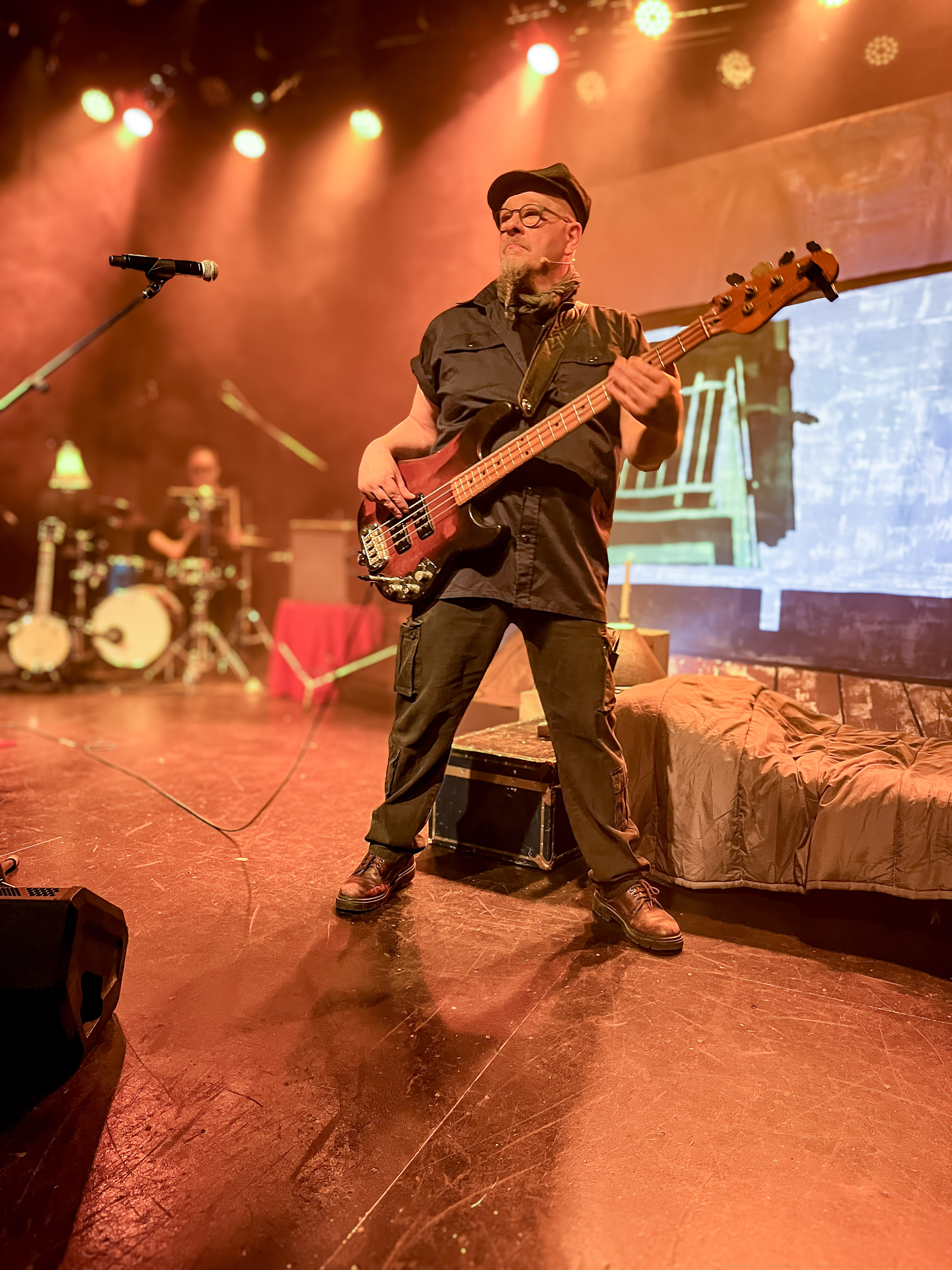

Background information
- Born: André Vanderbiest; May 14, 1964 (age 62); Brussels, Belgium
- Genres: Rock, Reggae, Dub, Folk
- Years active: 1990–present
- Label: Mayk Music

André Vanderbiest (born 14 May 1964 in Brussels), also known as André Dédé Vander, or simply Vander, is a Belgian musician best known for having been the bassist of the Quebec rock group Les Colocs. Vanderbiest sold all his possessions and immigrated to Quebec in January 1996 at the invitation of André "Dédé" Fortin, the leader of Les Colocs. He joined the group during a crucial period in its history, contributing significantly to their critically acclaimed and commercially successful album Dehors Novembre (1998). His background in reggae and dub helped shape the group's evolving sound.

== Career ==
=== Les Frères Brozeur, 1990–1996 ===
Before immigrating to Quebec, Vanderbiest was a founding member of Les Frères Brozeur, a Belgian musical group known for its theatrical performances and eclectic style. Formed in 1990 with his brothers, the group gained a cult following in Belgium and France. Vanderbiest developed his skills as a bassist within the group, refining his technique through dedicated practice. His time with Les Frères Brozeur laid the groundwork for his later work, allowing him to explore different genres and stage dynamics that influenced his approach with Les Colocs.

=== Les Colocs, 1996–2001 ===
Upon joining Les Colocs in 1996, Vanderbiest became an essential part of the group's creative process, most notably during the recording of Dehors Novembre in 1998. Vanderbiest and Dédé Fortin worked in close collaboration, taking a meticulous approach to songwriting and production; many tracks on the album were reworked dozens of times. The album sold more than 200,000 copies, establishing itself as a classic in the history of Quebec music.

"La Maladresse", performed by Vanderbiest on Dehors Novembre (1998), is a contemplative piece exploring themes of isolation and existential uncertainty through evocative metaphors. The song's understated arrangement and introspective lyrics mark a departure from the more exuberant style of Les Colocs' earlier work, reflecting the album's shift toward a darker and more reflective tone.

Following the suicide of Dédé Fortin in May 2000, Vanderbiest, together with guitarist Mike Sawatzky, reviewed recordings and live performances to compile a posthumous album, Suite 2116 (2001). The album was named after 2116 Saint-Laurent Boulevard, the address where Fortin had founded the group in 1990. Vanderbiest described his role in the project as that of a documentarian, aiming to preserve the group's legacy without exploiting Fortin's death. He subsequently described Fortin's death as one of the most difficult periods of his life, during which he turned largely to instrumental music before eventually beginning to speak about his experience a decade later. This included giving talks on suicide prevention at CEGEPs and festivals.

In 2005, Dehors Novembre was adapted into a Canadian animated short film by Patrick Bouchard, illustrating themes of mortality set to the music of Les Colocs' title track.

=== Solo career, 2001–present ===
After Les Colocs disbanded, Vanderbiest embarked on a solo career, drawing on his reggae and dub influences while continuing to experiment with different styles.

- Vander et du beau monde (2002) – His debut solo album, which he described as a natural continuation of his work with Les Colocs. It featured collaborations with the Diouf brothers, Loco Locass, and Polo of Les Frères à ch'val.
- ReDub Chroniques (2003) – A reggae-inspired album featuring Richard Desjardins, Jim Corcoran, Marie-Jo Thério, Stefie Shock, Daniel Boucher, Martha Wainwright, and Les Sœurs McGarrigle.
- Mossman Meets Vander (2004) – A collaboration with DJ Mossman, making use of vintage Jamaican recording techniques.
- Bass Ma Boom Vol. 1 (2007) – A reflection of his live dub performances in Montreal, featuring collaborations with European reggae artists.
- La Comète (2009) – An unreleased recording by Dédé Fortin, rediscovered by Vanderbiest. A portion of the album's proceeds was donated to the Fondation Dédé Fortin, which is dedicated to suicide prevention.
- French Toast et Peines Perdues (2011) – This album marked a turning point in Vanderbiest's career, moving away from his strong reggae influences to embrace folk and chanson styles. It was produced in collaboration with Amélie Laflamme and won the SOCAN Composition Prize for the song "Y'a pas que" at the Festival en chanson de Petite-Vallée.
- Une Fois Au Chalet (2021) – A six-track mini-album blending chanson, reggae, dub, and honky-tonk influences. The album addresses themes of domestic violence, aging, and memory, and includes a song inspired by his mother's experience with Alzheimer's disease.
- L'Anse-Pleureuse (2024) – A blend of folk and blues, combining wit and introspection. Inspired by his life in the Gaspésie, it explores aging, self-acceptance, and the balance between rebellion and peace, delivered in his characteristically raw sound and ironic sensibility.

=== Dehors Novembre, theatrical documentary ===
In 2022, Vanderbiest co-created Dehors Novembre, a theatrical documentary revisiting the making of Les Colocs' landmark album through his own memories. Directed by Marilyn Bastien, the production focused on the poetry and humanity of Dédé Fortin rather than on his tragic fate. Alongside actor Hubert Proulx, Vanderbiest shared anecdotes about the making of the album, highlighting the intense creative process and cultural influences that shaped its sound. The production aimed to celebrate the music and collaborative spirit of Les Colocs, challenging the perception that Dehors Novembre was solely a dark and unsettling work. In July 2025, Vanderbiest announced his intention to restage the theatrical documentary in 2027.

In July 2025, Vanderbiest formed Le Vander Trio, an acoustic group, and announced a retrospective show revisiting three decades of his work. The show blends older material with new compositions in what he calls "vandérised atmospheres". Vanderbiest has described his ever-evolving style as "never really reggae, never really folk", but rather a blend of influences.

== Awards and honours ==
In 2019, Vanderbiest received the Creator of the Year award from the Conseil des arts et des lettres du Québec (CALQ). The award, accompanied by a $5,000 grant, was presented at the annual general meeting of Culture Gaspésie in recognition of his significant contribution to the arts in the region. This includes the founding of the Tout Mélangé music festival in 2015, held in Mont-Louis, where he resides.

== Personal life and influence ==
After years in Montreal, Vanderbiest settled in Mont-Louis in 2010, seeking artistic renewal and a quieter life. He described the move as a departure from the Montreal music scene, which he felt he had exhausted. Vanderbiest focuses on songwriting and music production, continuing to blend his folk, reggae, and French chanson influences. He also teaches music and leads music workshops in schools in Gaspé and across Quebec. He has stated that he appreciates both the creative space and the more affordable cost of living compared to city life.

In 2016, following the 2016 Brussels bombings, Vanderbiest expressed concern about the erosion of civil liberties in Europe and reflected on his sense of security in Mont-Louis.

Although often nicknamed "the other Dédé of Les Colocs", Vanderbiest has carved his own path on the Quebec music scene. His body of work remains an essential part of the Les Colocs legacy, and his solo career has been praised for its introspective lyrics and innovative sonic blending.
