= Tassez-vous de d'là =

Song by Les Colocs

from the album Dehors novembre
- Released: 1998
- Venue: Montreal
- Genre: ska, rock
- Length: 5:33
- Label: Musicomptoir
- Songwriter: André Fortin
- Composer: Les Colocs
- Producers: André Fortin, Mike Sawatzky, Normand Renaud-Joly

Les Colocs singles chronology
"Pis si ô moins"	"Tassez-vous de d'là"	"La Maladresse"

Tassez-vous de d'là (French for Move Out of the Way) is a song by the Quebec band Les Colocs, released in 1998. It is one of the group's most recognized and iconic songs. The track won the SOCAN award for Best Popular Song of 1999. In 2022, a Québecor Média ranking listed Tassez-vous de d'là among the 100 greatest songs in Quebec's history.

The French lyrics were written by André Fortin, also known as Dédé Fortin. The refrain was sung and composed in Wolof by Dakar-born singer El Hadji Diouf, known as Élage Diouf, whose Montreal career was launched through this collaboration. Fortin and André Vanderbiest, known as Vander, co-wrote the music.

== Lyrics ==
Tassez-vous de d'là tells the story of a narrator searching for a long-lost friend who has fallen into drug addiction, particularly heroin and cocaine. The narrator recalls his friend's physical and mental decline, appearing on the edge of collapse. He expresses guilt and regret for abandoning him, calling himself the “coward of cowards” for not stepping in sooner. Throughout the song, he seeks forgiveness, hopes to see his friend again, and faces the pain of having left him alone in his darkest moments.

The refrain includes several lines in Wolof: “Balma balma sama wadji/Khadjalama yonwi/Djeguelma djeguelma sama wadji/Khadjalama yonwi/Sama wadji khadjalama yonwi.” These emblematic verses, long unintelligible to most French speakers, roughly translate as: “Forgive me, forgive me my friend/Guide me on the right path/Support me, support me my companion/Guide me on the right path/My friend, guide me on the right path.”

== Music video ==
The video for Tassez-vous de d'là was nominated at the ADISQ gala in 1999. It was filmed in May 1998 on Émery Street in Montreal. The video is a slowed-down black-and-white sequence shot featuring dozens of extras in the street, including Alain Coulombe, known as Alcatraz, one of the vendors of the magazine L'Itinéraire.

== Tribute version ==
In 2018, Vander, the bassist of Les Colocs, released a new version of Tassez-vous de d'là with his reggae-dub collective Bass ma Boom Sound System. This tribute, marking the song's 20th anniversary, blended elements of joual, Wolof, reggae, blues and African percussion. Several artists, including Boucar Diouf and Karim Ouellet, contributed to this version.
