= Marie. Eduardo. Sophie. =

- Directed by: Thomas Corriveau
- Produced by: Thomas Corriveau
- Edited by: Thomas Corriveau
- Music by: Guido Del Fabbro
- Release date: May 2023 (Sommets du cinéma d'animation)
- Running time: 3 minutes
- Country: Canada

Marie. Eduardo. Sophie. is a Canadian short animated film, directed by Thomas Corriveau and released in 2023. His second experiment in animating dance following 2021's They Dance With Their Heads (Ils dansent avec leurs têtes), the film is an animated rendition of a dance work performed by professional dancers Marie Mougeolle, Eduardo Ruiz Vergara and Sophie Corriveau.

The film premiered at the 2023 Sommets du cinéma d'animation in May 2023, and was subsequently screened at the 2023 Annecy International Animation Film Festival.

The film received a Prix Iris nomination for Best Animated Short Film at the 25th Quebec Cinema Awards in 2023.
