= Entropic Memory =

2024 Canadian short film directed by Nicolas Brault

- French: Mémoire entropique
- Directed by: Nicolas Brault
- Written by: Nicolas Brault
- Produced by: Nicolas Brault
- Music by: Mathieu Charbonneau; Simon Trottier
- Animation by: Nicolas Brault
- Production company: Nicolas Brault Films
- Release date: May 2024 (Sommets du cinéma d'animation)
- Running time: 6 minutes
- Country: Canada

Entropic Memory (French: Mémoire entropique) is a Canadian animated short film, directed by Nicolas Brault and released in 2024. An exploration of memory, the film portrays the unreliability of documenting the past by depicting family photographs damaged by water.

The film premiered at the 2024 Sommets du cinéma d'animation.

== Awards ==
Award	Date of ceremony	Category	Recipient(s)	Result	Ref.
Sommets du cinéma d'animation	2024	École NAD-UQAC Jury Prize	Nicolas Brault	Won	
Animafest Zagreb	2024	Golden Zagreb Award for Creativity and Innovative Artistic Achievement	Nicolas Brault	Won	
Prix Iris	December 8, 2024	Best Animated Short Film	Nicolas Brault	Nominated	
VIENNA SHORTS	2025	Jury Prize for Outstanding Artistic Achievement	Nicolas Brault	Won	
