= Dehors novembre =

- Directed by: Patrick Bouchard
- Written by: Marcel Jean
- Produced by: Michèle Bélanger
- Edited by: Daniel Lavoie
- Music by: Les Colocs
- Animation by: Paul Bouchard
- Production company: National Film Board of Canada
- Release date: September 18, 2005
- Running time: 7 minutes
- Country: Canada

Dehors novembre is a Canadian animated short film, directed by Patrick Bouchard and released in 2005. Inspired in part by the suicide of Quebec rock musician Dédé Fortin, the film depicts various characters facing mortality in a bleak cityscape to the soundtrack of "Dehors novembre", a song by Fortin's band Les Colocs which was itself inspired by the prior death of Fortin's bandmate Patrick Esposito Di Napoli.

The film was a Genie Award nominee for Best Animated Short at the 26th Genie Awards in 2006, and won the Jutra Award for Best Animated Short at the 8th Jutra Awards the same year.
