= Nicolas Dufour-Laperrière =

Canadian film producer

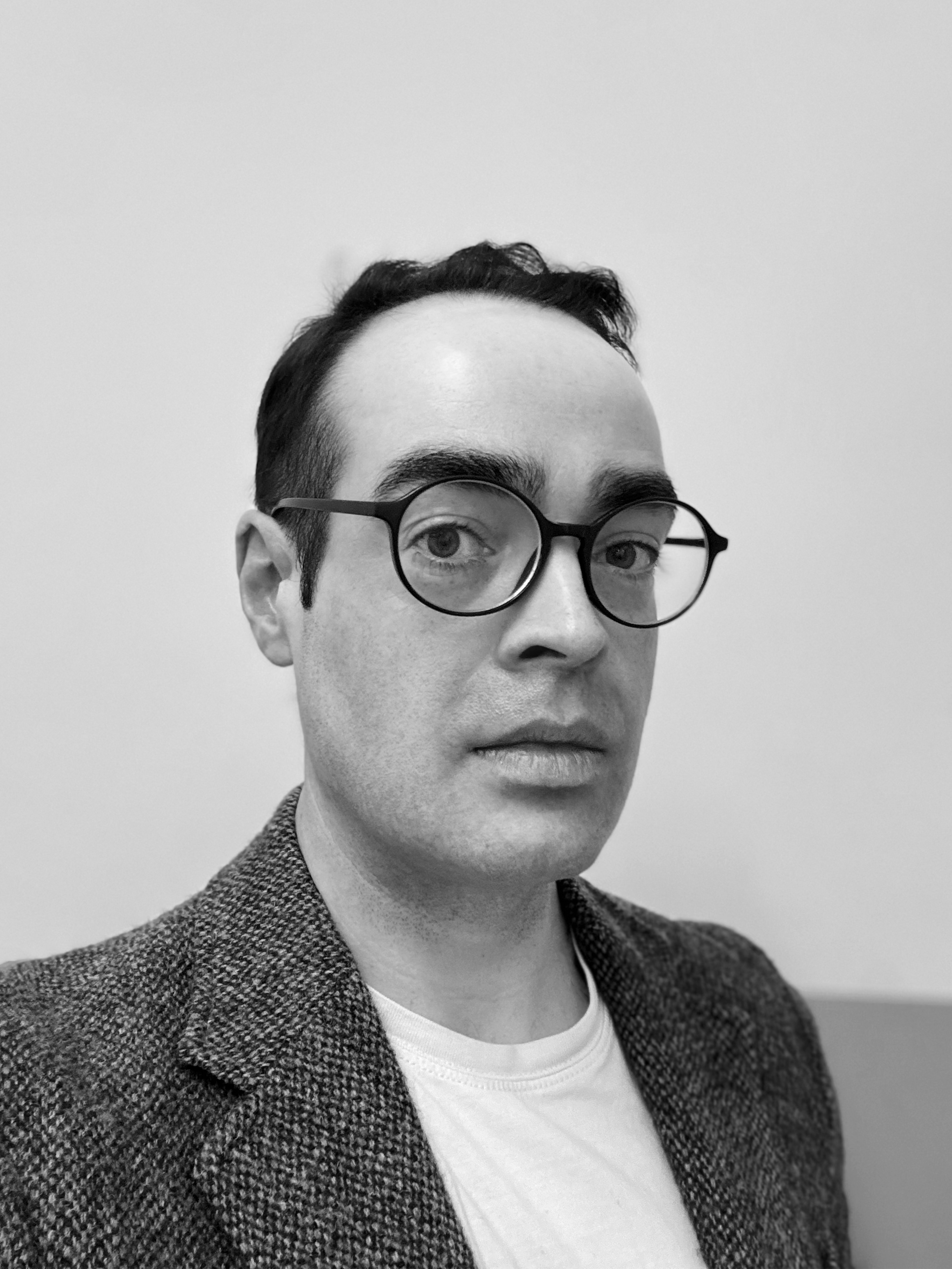
Nicolas Dufour-Laperriere

Nicolas Dufour-Laperrière is a Canadian film director and producer from Quebec. The brother of film director Félix Dufour-Laperrière, with whom he cofounded the studio Embuscade Films, he is most noted as producer of Éléonore Goldberg's short film Hibiscus Season (La saison des hibiscus), which won the Prix Iris winner for Best Animated Short Film at the 23rd Quebec Cinema Awards in 2021.

He was also the producer of his brother's animated documentary film Archipelago, which was a Prix Iris nominee for Best Documentary Film at the 24th Quebec Cinema Awards in 2022, and of Marie-Noëlle Moreau Robidas's animated short Triangle of Darkness (Triangle noir), which was a Canadian Screen Award nominee for Best Animated Short at the 11th Canadian Screen Awards, and a Prix Iris nominee for Best Animated Short at the 25th Quebec Cinema Awards.

The Shimmering Shadows (Les Ombres lumineuses), his debut documentary film as a director, is slated to premiere in the National Competition at the 2026 Festival du nouveau cinéma.
