= Clothing (film) =

- French: Les Vêtements
- Directed by: Caroline Blais
- Written by: Caroline Blais
- Produced by: Caroline Blais; Carolyne Goyette
- Cinematography: Marianne Ploska
- Edited by: Caroline Blais; Marlene Poulin
- Music by: Silvano Mercado Vilches
- Distributed by: La Distributrice de films
- Release date: 2019
- Running time: 9 minutes
- Country: Canada

Clothing (French: Les Vètements) is a Canadian short animated film, directed by Janice Nadeau and released in 2019. The film depicts a woman's sentimental relationship with her wardrobe, using minimalist line drawings so that the colours and patterns in her clothes stand out as the focus of attention.

The film premiered at the 2019 Sommets du cinéma de l'animation de Montréal.

The film received a Prix Iris nomination for Best Animated Short Film at the 22nd Quebec Cinema Awards in 2020.
