= Arwad (film) =

- Film poster
- Directed by: Dominique Chila; Samer Najari
- Written by: Samer Najari
- Produced by: Marcel Jean; Galilé Marion-Gauvin; Samer Najari
- Starring: Ramzi Choukair; Fanny Mallette; Julie McClemens; Dalal Ata
- Cinematography: Pierre Mignot
- Edited by: Mathieu Bouchard-Malo
- Music by: Robert Marcel Lepage; Radwan Ghazi Moumneh
- Production company: Les Productions Unité Centrale
- Distributed by: FunFilm Distribution
- Release date: October 12, 2013 (FNC)
- Running time: 105 minutes
- Country: Canada
- Language: French

Arwad is a Canadian drama film, directed by Dominique Chila and Samer Najari and released in 2013. The film stars Ramzi Choukair as Ali, a Syrian Canadian man who seeks to return to his roots following the death of his mother, by visiting his hometown of Arwad for the first time since emigrating to Canada. He travels with his mistress Marie (Fanny Mallette) while his wife Gabrielle (Julie McClemens) remains at home in Montreal, setting the film's plot in motion when he accidentally drowns in the ocean while swimming, and Gabrielle must travel to Syria to claim his body. Dalal Ata also appears in flashback scenes as Ali's mother.

Despite being set in Syria, the film was shot primarily in Tunisia due to the political and social instability of Syria at the time.

The film premiered at the Festival du nouveau cinéma in October 2013, before going into commercial release in February 2014.

The film received two Jutra Award nominations at the 17th Jutra Awards in 2015, for Best Supporting Actress (Ata) and Best Sound (Olivier Calvert, Clovis Gouaillier and Sylvain Vary).
