= Bad Seeds (2021 film) =

- French: Mauvaises herbes
- Directed by: Claude Cloutier
- Written by: Claude Cloutier
- Produced by: Galilé Marion-Gauvin; Julie Roy
- Edited by: Guillaume Fortin
- Music by: Robert Marcel Lepage
- Production companies: Productions l'Unite Centrale; The National Film Board of Canada
- Distributed by: National Film Board of Canada
- Release date: May 20, 2021 (Sommets du cinéma d'animation)
- Running time: 6 minutes
- Country: Canada

Bad Seeds (French: Mauvaises herbes) is a Canadian animated short film, written, directed and animated by Claude Cloutier for the National Film Board of Canada. The short had its international premiere at the Annecy International Animation Film Festival, and won multiple awards for Best Animated Short Film in Calgary International Film Festival and the 2021 New York City Short Film Festival and the Sommets du cinéma d'animation. The film was shortlisted for the Academy Award for Best Animated Short Film for the 94th Academy Awards.

== Plot ==
Bad Seeds depicts a surreal modern-day fable where two carnivorous plants, who can change shape like chameleons change colours, would rather fight over flies than work together to survive. Growth is intertwined with rivalry; evolution with competition, resulting in a startling conflict littered with references to historical figures, popular culture, board games, and more.

== Accolades ==
Year	Presenter/Festival	Award/Category	Status	Ref
2021	Sommets du cinéma d'animation	Public Prize in the international competition	Won	
2021	New York City Short Film Festival	Best Animated Short Film	Won	
2021	Los Angeles Animation Festival	Comedy Short Award & Best of the Fest	Won	
2021	94th Academy Awards	Academy Award for Best Animated Short Film	Shortlisted	
2022	24th Quebec Cinema Awards	Prix Iris for Best Animated Short Film	Nominated	
