= Triangle of Darkness =

- French: Triangle noir
- Directed by: Marie-Noëlle Moreau Robidas
- Written by: Marie-Noëlle Moreau Robidas
- Produced by: Nicolas Dufour-Laperrière
- Starring: Pol Pelletier
- Edited by: Simon Gaudreau
- Music by: Félix-Antoine Morin
- Animation by: Marie-Noëlle Moreau Robidas
- Production company: Embuscade Films
- Distributed by: La Distributrice de films
- Release date: March 2022 (Regard)
- Running time: 15 minutes
- Country: Canada
- Language: French

Triangle of Darkness (French: Triangle noir) is a Canadian animated short film, directed by Marie-Noëlle Moreau Robidas and released in 2022. A meditation on the loneliness and isolation that can affect people in times of crisis, the film centres on a homeless woman (Pol Pelletier) who takes shelter in an abandoned house during the January 1998 North American ice storm, only to find unexpected companionship.

The film was screened in Telefilm Canada's annual Not Short on Talent program at the 2022 Clermont-Ferrand International Short Film Festival industry market in February 2022, in advance of its official premiere at the Saguenay International Short Film Festival in March.

== Awards ==
The film won the Audience Award at the 2022 Sommets du cinéma d'animation, and received an honorable mention from the jury for the Best Animated Short award at the 2022 Les Percéides.

The film was a Canadian Screen Award nominee for Best Animated Short at the 11th Canadian Screen Awards, and a Prix Iris nominee for Best Animated Short Film at the 25th Quebec Cinema Awards.
