= Madeleine (2023 film) =

- Film poster
- Directed by: Raquel Sancinetti
- Cinematography: Stéphanie Weber Biron
- Edited by: Sharron Mirsky; Raquel Sancinetti
- Music by: Sacha Ratcliffe
- Distributed by: La Distributrice de films
- Release date: March 25, 2023 (Regard)
- Running time: 15 minutes
- Country: Canada
- Language: French

Madeleine is a 2023 Canadian short animated film, directed by Raquel Sancinetti. Based on Sancinetti's own real-life friendship with Madeleine, a centenarian woman, the film blends documentary and fictional elements, and both live-action and puppet animation, to depict a story about her taking Madeleine on a road trip.

According to Sancinetti, Madeleine was a woman she first met in 2017 through a friend who taught fitness classes at the retirement home where Madeleine lived, whom she built a friendship with and began to visit regularly; however, being of advanced age, Madeleine was reluctant to leave the home as she needed to conserve her limited energy for regular daily life activities, so Sancinetti decided to take her friend on one last life adventure through animation.

The film premiered at the 2023 Saguenay International Short Film Festival. It was later added to Op-Docs, the film streaming platform of The New York Times.

The film was named to the Toronto International Film Festival's annual Canada's Top Ten list for 2023.

== Awards ==
Award	Date of ceremony	Category	Recipient(s)	Result	Ref(s)
Saguenay International Short Film Festival	March 27, 2023	FIPRESCI Prize	Raquel Sancinetti	Won	
Sommets du cinéma d'animation	May 16, 2023	Public Prize	Raquel Sancinetti	Won	
Sommets du cinéma d'animation	May 16, 2023	Best Performance	Raquel Sancinetti	Won	
Gimli Film Festival	August 11, 2023	Best Canadian Short Film	Madeleine	Won	
Les Percéides	August 22, 2023	Best Quebec Short Film	Madeleine	Won	
Edmonton International Film Festival	October 1, 2023	Best Short Documentary	Madeleine	Won	
Uppsala International Short Film Festival	October 28, 2023	Best International Film	Madeleine	Won	
Uppsala International Short Film Festival	October 28, 2023	Audience Award, International Competition	Madeleine	Won	
Prix Iris	December 10, 2023	Best Animated Short Film	Raquel Sancinetti	Won	
Prix collégial du cinéma québécois	April 5, 2024	Best Short Film	Raquel Sancinetti	Won	
Canadian Screen Awards	May 2024	Best Short Documentary	Raquel Sancinetti	Won	
