= Patrick Esposito Di Napoli =

Canadian musician (1964–1994)

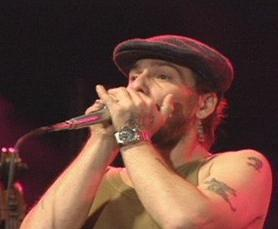
- Born: January 18, 1964
- Died: November 13, 1994 (aged 30); Montreal
- Known for: Les Colocs

Patrick Esposito Di Napoli (January 18, 1964 – November 13, 1994) was a musician and founding member of the Quebec rock band Les Colocs, for which he played the harmonica.

== Early life and education ==
Di Napoli was born to a family of Italian descent in Perpignan, in the Pyrénées-Orientales département in France.

== Career ==
He started making music in the 1970s, sometimes writing his own lyrics and melodies. For a time he lived with other musicians in an artist's loft in Montreal.

A passionate blues enthusiast, Di Napoli credited his love for the harmonica to hearing Mick Jagger’s playing on Midnight Rambler from The Rolling Stones' Let It Bleed album. He later immersed himself in blues music, with "I Got My Eyes on You" by Sonny Terry being the first song he learned on the harmonica.

Di Napoli was a key member of Les Colocs from their early performances in 1990, including their debut show at the Tallulah Club during the Festival international rock de Montréal, until his final performances at Club Soda in late October 1994. His powerful harmonica playing became a signature element of the band's sound, contributing to their success, including multiple Félix Awards at the ADISQ gala.

Di Napoli wrote the song "Séropositif Boogie", which appeared on the band's first album in 1993, about living with HIV. He contracted the virus from using a tainted needle to inject heroin.

== Living with HIV and death ==
Despite his diagnosis, he remained joyful and defiant, using music to confront his fate. His lyrics in "Séropositif Boogie" reflected his attitude:

"Histoire de voir mon bilan d'santé / Pas d'chance mec! T'es vraiment tricart / Me disait le toubib: Eh ben! tu l'as pogné!"

"Just to see my health report / No luck, man! You're really out of luck / The doctor told me: Well! You got it!"

Until his final days, Di Napoli continued playing music, surrounded by friends. He died on November 13, 1994, at the age of 30 from complications related to AIDS. In a statement, his bandmates described him as "at peace with himself and with others," adding that "he played his music until the very end. For that, and for everything else, he will never truly die."

== Legacy ==
Les Colocs paid homage to him by using pictures of him during live shows. They dedicated their final album, Dehors novembre (November Begone) (1998), to Di Napoli. It is considered their best album. The title track, written by lead singer Dédé Fortin, expressed the point of view of a dying man, and was later used as the soundtrack to Patrick Bouchard's animated short film Dehors novembre.

He was portrayed by Dimitri Storoge in the 2009 film Through the Mist (Dédé, à travers les brumes).

== See also ==
- List of Quebec musicians
- Music of Quebec
- Culture of Quebec
