= Serge Robert =

Mononc' Serge
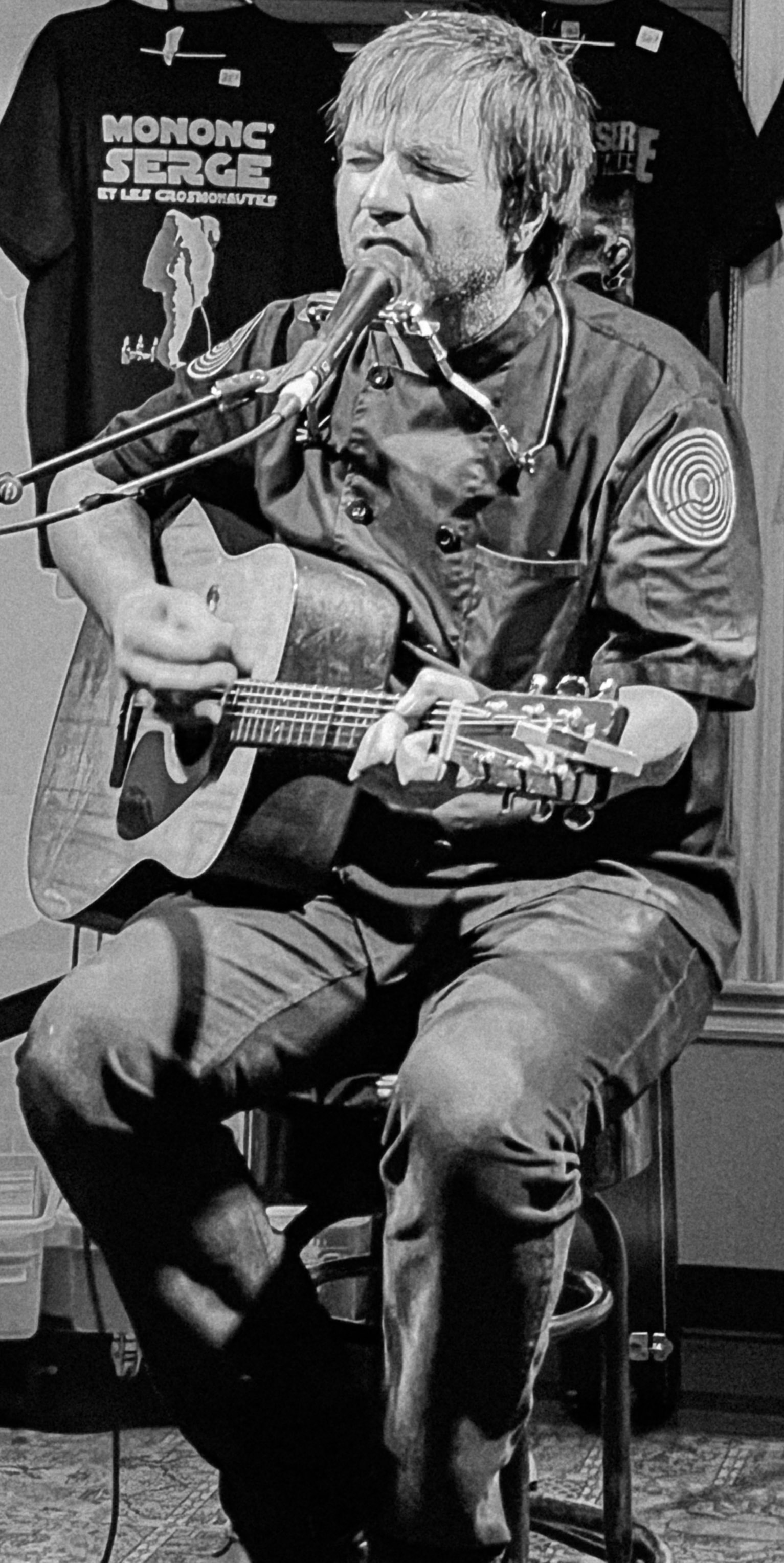
- Serge Robert in 2025 in Coaticook, QC

Background information
- Born: Serge Robert; 1970 (age 55–56); LaSalle, Quebec, Canada
- Genres: Comedy rock, thrash metal
- Occupations: Musician, songwriter
- Instruments: Vocals, bass
- Years active: 1990–present
- Website: www.mononc.com

Mononc' Serge (born Serge Robert, 1970) is a Québécois musician and poet known for his satirical songs about politicians, local celebrities, and social issues. His lyrics often mix humor with sharp criticism, particularly of the Quebec federalist movement and Canadian politics. "Mononc' Serge" translates to "Unc Serge" in French.

== History ==
Serge Robert began his career as the first official bassist for Les Colocs in 1990, replacing Marc Déry. His tenure was marked by creative tensions with frontman André "Dédé" Fortin, who opposed Robert’s desire to pursue outside projects. Financial concerns also contributed to his departure in 1995. After leaving, he played in Les Quarts de Rouge and Les Blaireaux before launching his solo career as Mononc' Serge.

Mononc’ Serge first developed his musical persona on the community radio station CIBL, where he created irreverent songs inspired by current events. His early success led to his debut album, Mononc' Serge chante 97 (1997). His provocative and often vulgar humor became a defining feature of his work.

His 2001 album Mon voyage au Canada (My Trip to Canada) features one song for each Canadian province and territory, mostly poking fun at each of them. The project began as a songwriting challenge on CIBL.

In 2003, Mononc' Serge partnered with the thrash metal band Anonymus to release L'Académie du massacre, an album featuring heavy metal versions of his existing songs alongside a few new compositions. The collaboration proved popular, leading to the release of a live DVD, La Pâques Satanique.

By 2008, growing fan demand led Mononc' Serge to reunite with Anonymus for a second album, Musique barbare, this time composed entirely of new material. Unlike their previous collaboration, this album focused on original songs with a consistent heavy metal sound. The lyrics tackled a variety of themes, from drug use at Woodstock en Beauce to self-deprecating reflections on his own artistic style (Tout l'monde se crisse de Mononc' Serge). In interviews, Mononc' Serge explained that while his stage persona is crude and provocative, he personally considers himself a reserved and polite individual. However, he continues to embrace controversial lyrics, believing that vulgarity and satire can coexist with thoughtful social commentary.

== Return to Topical Satire: Mononc' Serge 2015 ==
In 2014, Mononc' Serge returned to writing songs inspired by current events for the television show Ce show, hosted by Mike Ward on MusiquePlus. He later adapted this approach into online video segments for Voir. His 2015 album, Mononc' Serge 2015, marked a return to political and cultural satire, featuring songs about figures such as Philippe Couillard, Pierre Karl Péladeau, and Stephen Harper, as well as broader topics like media coverage and social tensions.

== Discography ==
- 1997: Mononc' Serge chante 97
- 1998: Mourir pour le Canada
- 1998: Mononc' Serge chante 98
- 2000: 13 tounes trash
- 2001: Mon voyage au Canada
- 2003: L'Académie du massacre (with Anonymus)
- 2006: Serge Blanc d'Amérique
- 2008: Musique barbare (with Anonymus)
- 2011: Final Bâton DVD recorded Live in Montreal 2010.12.28 and Quebec 2010.12.29 (with Anonymus)
- 2012: Ca, c'est d'la femme!
- 2013: Pourquoi Mononc' Serge joues-tu du rock'n'roll?
- 2015: Mononc' Serge 2015
- 2017: Révolution conservatrice
- 2019: Réchauffé
- 2020: Réchauffé II
- 2021: L'an 8000
- 2024: Métal canadien-français (with Anonymus)

== See also ==
- Culture of Quebec
- Les Colocs
- Music of Quebec
