= The Brainwashers =

- French: Les Ramoneurs cérébraux
- Directed by: Patrick Bouchard
- Written by: Patrick Bouchard; Martin Rodolphe Villeneuve
- Produced by: Marcel Jean
- Edited by: Denis Lavoie
- Music by: Jean-Pierre Bouchard
- Production company: National Film Board of Canada
- Release date: 2002
- Running time: 12 minutes
- Country: Canada

The Brainwashers (French: Les Ramoneurs cérébraux) is a Canadian animated short film, directed by Patrick Bouchard and released in 2002. The film centres on two chimney sweeps cleaning memories out of a man's brain in an attempt to understand how the human thought process works.

The film won the Prix Jutra for Best Animated Short Film at the 5th Jutra Awards.
