= Sébastien Ricard =

Canadian musician and actor

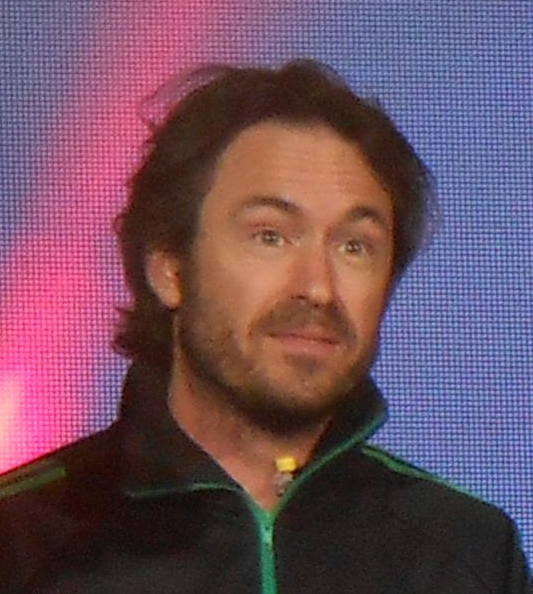
- Sébastien Ricard at the FrancoFolies de Montréal in 2013
- Born: May 25, 1972 (age 53); Quebec City, Quebec
- Years active: 1990s–present

Sébastien Ricard (born May 25, 1972) is a Canadian musician and actor from Quebec, most noted as a member of the hip hop band Loco Locass.

As an actor, he won the Prix Jutra for Best Actor at the 12th Jutra Awards in 2010 for his performance as Dédé Fortin in Through the Mist (Dédé, à travers les brumes), and was nominated for Best Supporting Actor at the 15th Jutra Awards in 2013 for his performance as Ji-Guy in Before My Heart Falls (Avant que mon cœur bascule).

== Filmography ==
=== Film ===
Year	Title	Role	Notes
2001	February 15, 1839 (15 février 1839)	Amable Daumais	
2003	The Barbarian Invasions (Les Invasions barbares)	Jérôme	
2006	Family History (Histoire de famille)	Singer	
2006	From My Window, Without a Home… (De ma fenêtre, sans maison...)	Pierre	
2009	Through the Mist (Dédé, à travers les brumes)	Dédé Fortin	
2010	TS: Travailleur social	Hugo	
2010	Cinéma des aveugles		
2012	Before My Heart Falls (Avant que mon cœur bascule)	Ji-Guy	
2013	Gabrielle	Raphaël	
2013	Une jeune fille	Serge	
2014	Antoine & Marie	Antoine Girard	
2015	Chorus	Christophe Ducharme	
2017	On This Day I Die (Qu'en ce jour je meure)		
2017	Hochelaga, Land of Souls (Hochelaga, terre des âmes)	Léopold Lacroix	
2018	Mad Dog Labine	Guénille	
2018	Pauvre Georges!	Carlo Galluccio	
2019	The Acrobat (L'Acrobate)	Christophe	
2020	The Vinland Club (Le Club Vinland)	Frère Jean	
2020	Live Story	Alex	
2021	Maria Chapdelaine	Samuel Chapdelaine	
2023	One Summer (Le temps d'un été)	François Riendeau	
2024	Hotel Silence	Jean	

=== Television ===
Year	Title	Role	Notes
2002	Tabou	Émile Vandelac	
2004	Fortier	Frappier twins	Three episodes
2006-2009	Les Hauts et les bas de Sophie Paquin	Mathieu	12 episodes
2007	Nos étés	André-Jules Belzile	Four episodes
2012	En thérapie	David	
2015-2016	The Clan (Le Clan)	Jean-François Gagnon	12 episodes
2017	Délateurs	Donald Lavoie	One episode
2017	Les Petits Meurtres d'Agatha Christie	Pianist	One episode
2017	Olivier	Monsieur Surprenant	Three episodes
2017-2018	Les Simone	Éloi Morel	17 episodes
2019-2022	Une autre histoire	Vincent Gagnon	67 episodes
2023	Le Gangster et le ministre	Lucien Rivard	
2023	The Wall (La Faille)	Damien Morency	Eight episodes
2025	Antigang	Denys Marchand	
