= Islet (film) =

- French: Îlot
- Directed by: Nicolas Brault
- Written by: Nicolas Brault
- Produced by: Michèle Bélanger
- Edited by: José Heppell
- Music by: Guy Pelletier
- Animation by: Nicolas Brault
- Production company: National Film Board of Canada
- Release date: 2003
- Running time: 7 minutes
- Country: Canada

Islet (French: Îlot) is a Canadian animated short film, directed by Nicolas Brault and released in 2003. Addressing themes of climate change, the film depicts an Inuk man who is fishing on an ice sheet that suddenly breaks up, leaving him drifting on an ice floe.

It was a Jutra Award nominee for Best Animated Short Film at the 6th Jutra Awards, and a Genie Award nominee for Best Animated Short at the 24th Genie Awards.
