= The Necktie =

2008 short film

- Directed by: Jean-François Lévesque
- Production company: National Film Board of Canada
- Release date: 2008
- Country: Canada
- Language: French

The Necktie (French: Le noeud cravate) is a 2008 animated short by Jean-François Lévesque about a man with a dreary job who rediscovers his old accordion at age 40, and with it, his joy for life.

The film uses a variety of animation techniques. The central character is a puppet filmed in stop-motion, inside miniature sets. His co-workers are animated with traditional animation drawings on paper, digitally integrated into shots but designed to give the appearance of being 2D cardboard cutouts. The Necktie was produced in Montreal by the National Film Board of Canada.

The film garnered the Jutra Award for Best Animated Short Film, the Fabrizio Bellochio Prize for Social Content at the I Castelli Animati Festival, the youth jury prize for best animated short at the Festival de cinéma des 3 Amériques as well as the Best Short Film Award and the Audience Prize for Best Canadian Short Film at the Montreal World Film Festival.
