= I, Barnabé =

2020 film by Jean-François Lévesque

- French: Moi, Barnabé
- Directed by: Jean-François Lévesque
- Written by: Jean-François Lévesque
- Produced by: Julie Roy
- Edited by: Annie Jean
- Music by: Robert Marcel Lepage
- Animation by: Jean-François Lévesque
- Production company: National Film Board of Canada
- Release date: June 14, 2020 (Annecy)
- Running time: 15 minutes
- Country: Canada

I, Barnabé (French: Moi, Barnabé) is a Canadian animated short film, directed by Jean-François Lévesque and released in 2020. The film centres on a Roman Catholic priest who undergoes a crisis of faith.

The film premiered on June 14, 2020, at the Annecy International Animation Film Festival.

The film received a Canadian Screen Award nomination for Best Animated Short at the 9th Canadian Screen Awards, and a Prix Iris nomination for Best Animated Short Film at the 23rd Quebec Cinema Awards.
