= Hibiscus Season =

2020 film by Éléonore Goldberg

- French: La saison des hibiscus
- Directed by: Éléonore Goldberg
- Written by: Éléonore Goldberg
- Produced by: Nicolas Dufour-Laperrière
- Edited by: Éléonore Goldberg; Stéphane Calce
- Music by: Stéphane Calce
- Animation by: Parissa Mohit; Kathleen Weldon; Éléonore Goldberg
- Production company: Embuscade Films
- Distributed by: La Distributrice de films
- Release date: 2020
- Running time: 10 minutes
- Country: Canada
- Language: French

Hibiscus Season (French: La saison des hibiscus) is a Canadian animated short film, directed by Éléonore Goldberg and released in 2020. Based on Goldberg's own childhood, the film centres on Rachel, a young girl from France living in Zaire with her family in the early 1990s, who is taking refuge with her mother in the French embassy in Kinshasa during the military riots.

The film won the Prix Iris for Best Animated Short Film at the 23rd Quebec Cinema Awards.
