= Soif =

- Directed by: Michèle Cournoyer
- Written by: Michèle Cournoyer
- Produced by: René Chénier; Marcel Jean; Galilé Marion-Gauvin
- Edited by: Jacques Drouin
- Music by: Jean-Phi Goncalves
- Animation by: Michèle Cournoyer
- Production company: National Film Board of Canada
- Release date: 2014
- Running time: 9 minutes
- Country: Canada

Soif (lit. "Thirsty") is a Canadian animated short film, directed by Michèle Cournoyer and released in 2014. The film depicts a woman's struggle with alcoholism.

The film was a Canadian Screen Award nominee for Best Animated Short Film at the 3rd Canadian Screen Awards, and a Jutra Award nominee for Best Animated Short Film at the 17th Jutra Awards.
