= Snow Hides the Shade of Fig Trees =

2010 Canadian film

- French: La neige cache l'ombre des figuiers
- Directed by: Samer Najari
- Written by: Marcel Jean; Samer Najari
- Produced by: Galilé Marion-Gauvin
- Cinematography: Michel La Veaux
- Edited by: Mathieu Bouchard-Malo
- Production company: L'Unité centrale
- Distributed by: Les Films du 3 mars
- Release date: 2009
- Running time: 21 minutes
- Country: Canada
- Languages: French; Arabic; Spanish

Snow Hides the Shade of Fig Trees (French: La neige cache l'ombre des figuiers) is a Canadian short drama film, directed by Samer Najari and released in 2009. The film centres on a multilingual group of new immigrants to Canada who are experiencing their first snowfall in the winter.

The cast includes Nelson Bolivar, Nedjim Bouizzoul, José Cuervo, Heylin Darwich, Daniel Deburghgraeve, Mohsen El Gharbi, Juan Hernandez, Salma-Lou Najari, Aliocha Schneider and Niels Schneider.

The film won the AQCC award for Best Short Film (Fiction) at the 2010 Rendez-vous du cinéma québécois, and was a Jutra Award nominee for Best Live Action Short Film at the 12th Jutra Awards.
