= Thomas Corriveau =

Canadian artist and animator

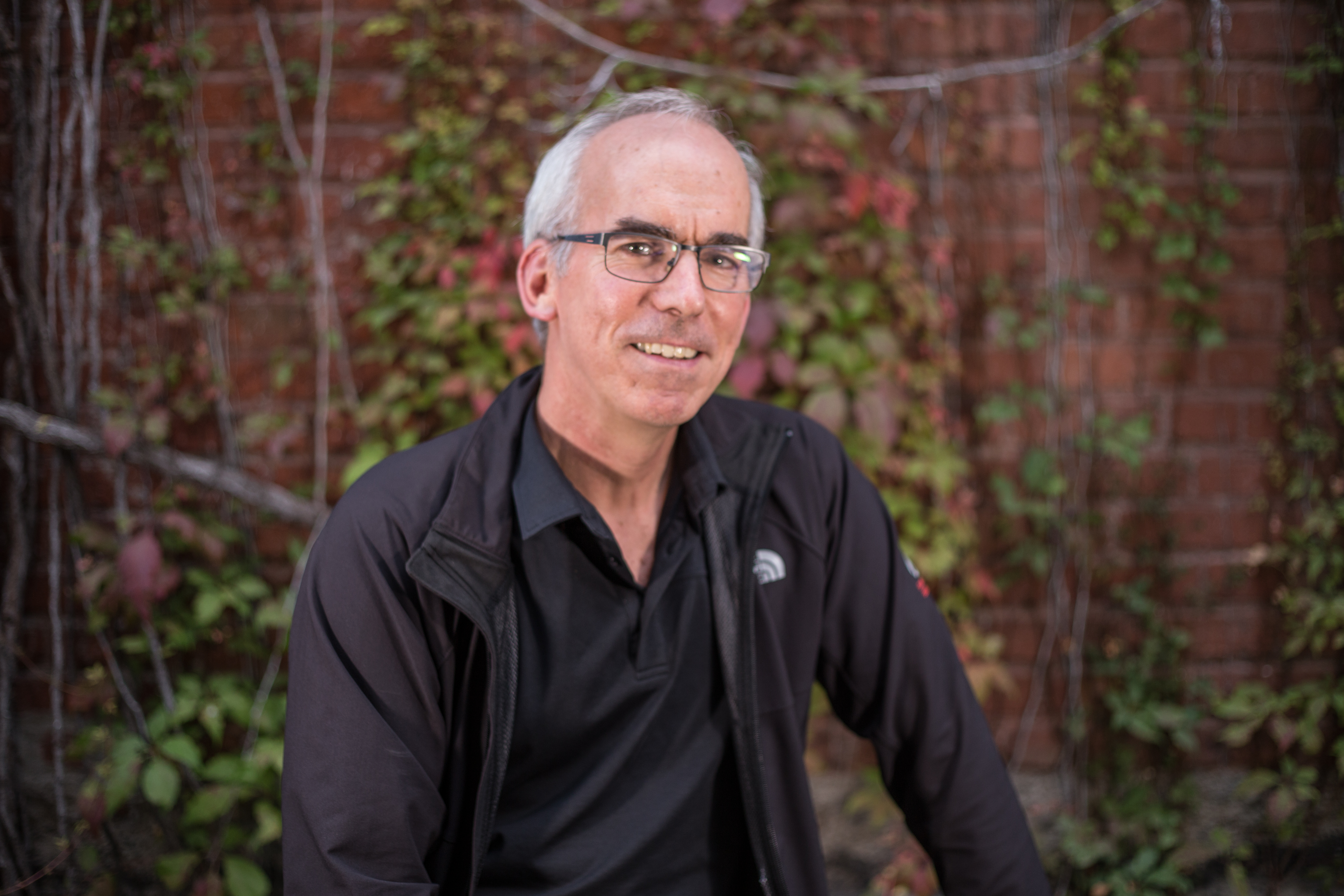
- Born: July 18, 1957 (age 68); Sainte-Foy, Quebec, Canada
- Years active: 1980s–present

Thomas Corriveau (born July 18, 1957) is a Canadian artist and filmmaker from Quebec. He is most noted as a two-time Prix Iris nominee for Best Animated Short Film, receiving nods at the 24th Quebec Cinema Awards in 2022 for They Dance With Their Heads (Ils dansent avec leurs têtes), and at the 25th Quebec Cinema Awards in 2023 for Marie. Eduardo. Sophie..

The son of writer Monique Corriveau, he is a professor in the École des arts visuels et médiatiques at the Université du Québec à Montréal, and was a co-founder with Gisèle Trudel and Michel Boulanger of the arts collective Grupmuv.

== Films ==
- Madame de Créhaux - 1981
- Kidnappé - 1988
- Depuis le silence - 2016
- La Bêtise - 2016
- They Dance With Their Heads (Ils dansent avec leurs têtes) - 2021
- Marie. Eduardo. Sophie. - 2023
