= Nicolas Brault =

Canadian animator

Nicolas Brault is a Canadian animator from Quebec. Associated in his early career with the National Film Board of Canada, and later with his own independent studio Nicolas Brault Films, he has been a professor of animation in the film studies program at Université Laval since 2019.

== Filmography ==
- Antagonia - 2002
- Islet (Îlot) - 2003
- Hungu - 2008
- The Circus (Le Cirque) - 2010
- Foreign Bodies (Corps étrangers) - 2013
- Squame - 2015
- Entropic Memory (Mémoire entropique) - 2024

== Awards ==
Award	Date of ceremony	Category	Recipient(s)	Result	Ref(s)
César Awards	2012	Best Animated Film	The Circus (Le Cirque)	Nominated	
Genie Awards	2004	Best Animated Short	Islet (Îlot)	Nominated	
Prix Iris	2003	Best Animated Short Film	Antagonia	Nominated	
Prix Iris	2004	Best Animated Short Film	Islet (Îlot)	Nominated	
Prix Iris	2016	Best Animated Short Film	Squame	Nominated	
Prix Iris	2024	Best Animated Short Film	Entropic Memory (Mémoire entropique)	Nominated	
