= The Hat (film) =

- French: Le Chapeau
- Directed by: Michèle Cournoyer
- Written by: Michèle Cournoyer
- Produced by: Thérèse Descary; Pierre Hébert
- Cinematography: Pierre Landry
- Edited by: Fernand Bélanger
- Music by: Jean Derome
- Animation by: Michèle Cournoyer
- Production company: National Film Board of Canada
- Release date: 1999
- Running time: 6 minutes
- Country: Canada

The Hat (French: Le Chapeau) is a Canadian adult animated short film, directed by Michèle Cournoyer and released in 1999. Told entirely without dialogue, the film centres on a young woman working as an exotic dancer in a bar. She recalls an incident from her childhood where she was sexually abused by a male visitor with a hat.

The film was screened in the International Critics' Week section of the 2000 Cannes Film Festival. It was also screened at the 2000 Toronto International Film Festival, where it was named the winner of the award for Best Canadian Short Film.

It subsequently won the Jutra Award for Best Animated Short Film at the 3rd Jutra Awards in 2001, and was later named as one of the 100 best animated films of all time in a critics' survey by Variety.
