= Robes of War =

- French: Robe de guerre
- Directed by: Michèle Cournoyer
- Written by: Michèle Cournoyer
- Edited by: Michel Giroux
- Music by: Walter Boudreau
- Animation by: Michèle Cournoyer
- Production company: National Film Board of Canada
- Release date: 2008
- Running time: 5 minutes
- Country: Canada

Robes of War (French: Robe de guerre) is a Canadian animated short film, directed by Michèle Cournoyer and released in 2003. The film centres on the impact of war on women, centring in particular on an Iranian women wearing a chador.

It won the Jutra Award for Best Animated Short Film at the 12th Jutra Awards in 2010.
