= Mamie (film) =

- Directed by: Janice Nadeau
- Written by: Janice Nadeau
- Produced by: Marc Bertrand; Corinne Destombes
- Starring: Isabelle Blais
- Music by: Benoît Charest
- Production companies: National Film Board of Canada; Folimage
- Release date: 2016
- Running time: 6 minutes
- Country: Canada
- Language: French

Mamie is a Canadian short animated film, directed by Janice Nadeau and released in 2016. The film narrates the story of a young girl who remembers her grandmother in Gaspésie, but feels that the older woman is indifferent and unaffectionate toward her.

The film was a Canadian Screen Award nominee for Best Animated Short Film at the 5th Canadian Screen Awards, and a Prix Iris nominee for Best Animated Short Film at the 19th Quebec Cinema Awards.
