= Parallels (TV series) =

2022 French sci-fi television series

- French: Parallèles
- Genre: Science fiction; Adventure
- Created by: Quoc Dang Tran
- Written by: Quoc Dang Tran; Anastasia Heinzl
- Directed by: Benjamin Rocher; Jean-Baptiste Saurel
- Composer: François Liétout
- Country of origin: France
- Original language: French
- No. of seasons: 1
- No. of episodes: 6

Production
- Producers: Quoc Dang Tran; Raphaël Rocher; Eric Laroche
- Running time: 34–42 minutes
- Production companies: Daïmôn Films; Empreinte Digitale

Original release
- Network: Disney+
- Release: March 23, 2022

Parallels (French: Parallèles; stylized as Para//èles) is a French science-fiction television series about four teenage friends who are affected by a physics experiment which fractures spacetime, sending their lives in divergent directions. It was produced by Daïmôn Films and Empreinte Digitale for the Walt Disney Company. The series premiered on Disney+ on 23 March 2022 in France, the US, and other countries.

== Plot ==
Four lifelong friends preparing to start high school – Bilal, Romane, and brothers Sam and Victor – find their reality disrupted when the test of an experimental particle collider sends them into parallel worlds.

== Cast and characters ==
- Thomas Chomel as Samuel "Sam" Deslandes – Victor's more responsible older brother. He has decided he wants a relationship with Romane.
- Jules Houplain as Victor Deslandes (17 years old)
  - Maxime Bergeron as Victor Deslandes (13 years old) – Sam's mischievous younger brother. He skipped a grade to be in the same class as the others.
- Omar Mebrouk as Bilal Belkebirs (30 years old)
  - Timoté Rigault as Bilal Belkebirs (14 years old) – He has a secret crush on Romane.
- Jade Pedri as Romane Berthauds (almost 18 years old)
  - Victoria Eber as Romane Berthauds (14 years old) – She is protective of her mother and her little half-sister Camille.
- Naidra Ayadi as Sofia Belkebirs – Bilal's widowed mother. She is a scientist at the research facility connected to the incident.
- Guillaume Labbé as Lieutenant Retz – A police officer investigating the disappearances.
- Gil Alma as Arnaud Deslandes – Sam and Victor's father.
- Elise Diamant as Alice Deslandes – Sam and Victor's mother.
- Dimitri Storoge as Hervé Chassangre – Father of Romane's young half-sister Camille. He and Vanessa divorced years earlier, but he wants to reconcile.
- Agnès Miguras as Vanessa Chassangre – Romane and Camille's mother. She has a serious heart condition.

== Episodes ==
| No. | Title | Directed by | Written by | Original release date |
|---|---|---|---|---|
| 1 | "Hard Awakening" "(Le monde dans ta face)" | Benjamin Rocher | Quoc Dang Tran & Anastasia Heinzl | March 23, 2022 |
Bilal, Romane, and brothers Sam and Victor are four friends who recently graduated middle school, looking forward to high school. To celebrate Bilal's birthday, the group parties in a bunker. Suddenly, a power outage happens and Victor and Romane disappear, with Bilal having mysteriously transformed into an adult. Sam files missing reports for the other three friends, with police officer Lieutenant Retz stepping up to the case. Bilal approaches his mother Sofia in a car, who worked on a particle accelerator project at the same time as the power outage, but she fails to recognize him and misunderstands him to be a stranger who has hurt Bilal. Bilal then visits Sam, successfully convincing him of his identity. Meanwhile, Victor and Romane are revealed to be in an alternate universe, where Sam and Bilal are missing.
| 2 | "Against All Odds" "(Contre toute attente)" | Benjamin Rocher | Quoc Dang Tran & Anastasia Heinzl | March 23, 2022 |
In Victor and Romane's universe, Victor is put under pressure by his parents due to his mischievous behavior over the years, and he unknowingly gains the ability of age manipulation. Romane's relationship with Hervé, her father with a gambling addiction, starts to get tense. Meanwhile, in Bilal and Sam's universe, Sam hides Bilal in the former's grandfather's cabin, keeping him a secret from Sofia, who starts to find a connection between the experiment and the disappearances.
| 3 | "Lost Time" "(Le temps perdu)" | Jean-Baptiste Saurel | Quoc Dang Tran & Anastasia Heinzl | March 23, 2022 |
In Sam and Bilal's universe, Bilal gets flashes of his future life, in which he has two kids and a wife. The two boys find a connection between Romane and Victor's disappearances and another disappearance of a boy named Hugo. While Bilal attempts to interview Hugo's father, Sam looks around Hugo's house and finds out that Hugo disappeared from an area near the bunker years ago. Meanwhile, Retz analyzes the fingerprints from Sofia's car and realizes that the fingerprints belonging to an adult are the same as Bilal's. As he is about to interrogate Sofia, she denies remembering the incident. In Victor and Romane's universe, four years have passed. Victor, facing bullies at a boarding school his parents sent him to, accidentally activates his powers again. Hervé, who intends on selling Romane's house to pay debt, gets into an argument with Vanessa, Romane's mother, who has heart problems. During the argument, Vanessa suffers a heart attack and soon dies. Victor gets news of a new particle accelerator test and invites Romane to the bunker at the time of the experiment. They soon find themselves back in Sam and Bilal's universe.
| 4 | "Bygone Innocence" "(Innocence révolue)" | Jean-Baptiste Saurel | Quoc Dang Tran & Anastasia Heinzl | March 23, 2022 |
Victor and Romane realize that they have been transported to Sam and Bilal's universe, one day after the disappearances. After checking on their families, they approach Sofia and manage to convince her of their identities. Now knowing that the adult she met had been Bilal all along, it is revealed that Sofia's denial of the incident was just a coverup to hide their identities. Sam visits Sofia, who reunites with Bilal. Sofia sends the group to hide in Sam's grandfather's cabin. Despite Sofia's warnings not to, Romane frequently sneaks out of the house to visit her family. After convincing Vanessa of her identity, she inadvertently causes her to have a heart attack after warning her of her death, gaining time freezing powers in the process. Victor and Bilal find out about the former's powers. Some time later, after Hervé leaves her sister Camille at home, Romane uses the opportunity and invites her friends to sneak Camille out of the house. However, Hervé suddenly goes back home and fights the group, mistaking them for strangers. After Romane finds an advantage with her powers, Victor ends the fight by aging Hervé to an old man.
| 5 | "A Simple Plan" "(Un plan simple)" | Jean-Baptiste Saurel | Quoc Dang Tran & Anastasia Heinzl | March 23, 2022 |
Tensions among the friends rise, causing Victor to flee. Bilal finds out that his future wife is Romane. Sofia experiments with the bunker, which results in failure. However, she gets a message from her future self, which warns her about a mistake that results in Sam's death. Sofia devises a plan that would set everything back to normal. Retz meets with Hervé and, after learning the truth, agrees to help the group. Sam is sent to jail as bait for Victor, while Romane drops off Camille at their mother in the hospital.
| 6 | "H-4" "(H-4)" | Benjamin Rocher | Quoc Dang Tran & Anastasia Heinzl | March 23, 2022 |
With the help of a doctor, Sofia attempts to have Bilal recollect his memory. It is revealed that this version of Bilal was sent to another universe with Romane where Sam and Victor are missing - they would later grow up and get married together, before Bilal went to the bunker and traveled back in time to fix the situation. With Bilal's memory starting to become clearer, he and Sofia extract information from the place that Sofia works at to modify the code. After failing to be convinced by Romane of his parents' care for him, Victor frees Sam and holds him and their parents hostage in the cabin, confronting them for their unfair treatment. The other friends arrive and comfort Victor, preventing the mistake that results in Sam's death. With the final test in four years approaching, the group gets to the bunker in time. They are transported back to their young selves on the night of the disappearances, and the day finishes as if nothing happened. Sam is able to make his parents reconsider their treatment of Victor. Sofia gets another message from her future self, who explains the previous events and recommends that she talks to Retz if help is needed. Sofia gives Bilal a birthday present. However, due to the present being the same one that Sofia gave adult Bilal, the entire group starts remembering the events, to her dismay.

== Reception ==
Joel Keller of Decider stated that the first episode manages to raise interest through its story, giving Parallels the potential to take many directions in the future in order to become an exciting science-fiction mystery show. Joly Herman of Common Sense Media rated the series 4 out of 5 stars, praised the show for promoting values such as love, loyalty, and persistence, complimented the positive role models, and found agreeable that the series has diversity among its cast members.
