= Rituals Under a Scarlet Sky =

2024 Canadian short film

- French: Rituels sous un ciel écarlate
- Directed by: Dominique Chila; Samer Najari
- Written by: Dominique Chila; Samer Najari
- Produced by: Galilé Marion-Gauvin
- Starring: Ayham Abou Ammar; Ayham Alhammoud; Ebrahim Abdo
- Cinematography: Alexandre Lampron
- Edited by: Dominique Chila; Samer Najari
- Production company: Unité Centrale
- Distributed by: La Distributrice de films
- Release date: October 11, 2024 (FNC)
- Running time: 15 minutes
- Country: Canada
- Language: Arabic

Rituals Under a Scarlet Sky (French: Rituels sous un ciel écarlate) is a Canadian short drama film, directed by Dominique Chila and Samer Najari and released in 2024. The film is a portrait of life in a wartorn Middle Eastern country, depicting various characters as they try to go about their lives in the midst of the danger and devastation.

The film premiered at the 2024 Festival du nouveau cinéma.

== Awards ==
Award	Date of ceremony	Category	Recipient	Result	Ref.
Prix collégial du cinéma québécois	2025	Best Short Film	Dominique Chila, Samer Najari	Nominated	
Quebec Cinema Awards	2025	Best Live Action Short Film	Dominique Chila, Samer Najari, Galilé Marion-Gauvin	Nominated	
