= Claude Cloutier =

Canadian film animator (born 1957)

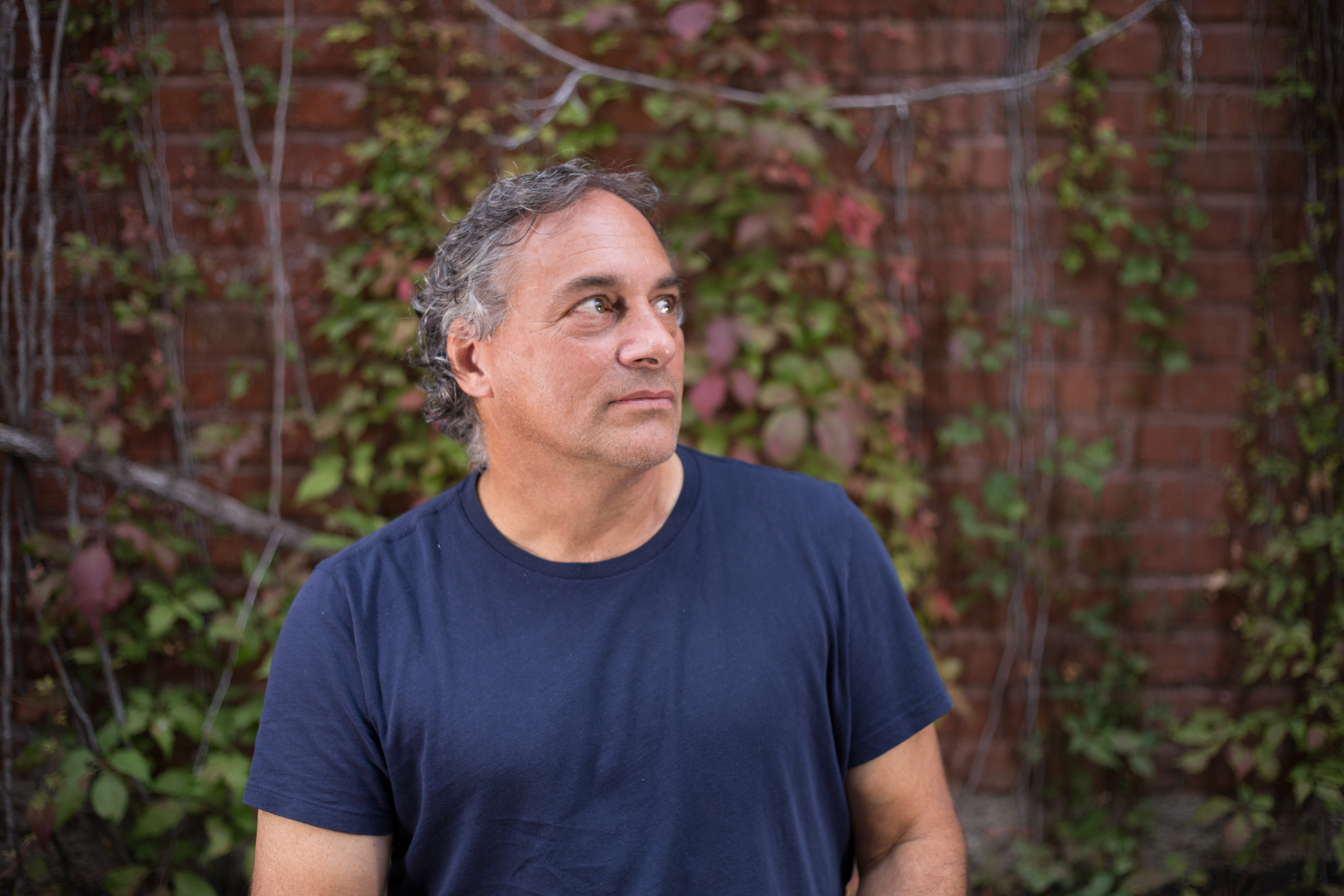
- Claude Cloutier at the Cinémathèque québécoise, 2017
- Born: July 6, 1957 (age 68); Montreal, Quebec, Canada
- Occupation: animator
- Years active: 1980s-present
- Notable work: From the Big Bang to Tuesday Morning, Sleeping Betty, Carface, Bad Seeds

Claude Cloutier is a Canadian film animator and illustrator based in Quebec. He has made seven short films with the National Film Board of Canada. He began his animation career with the 1988 short The Persistent Peddler (Le colporteur), which was in competition at the Cannes Film Festival. He became widely known for his 2000 film From the Big Bang to Tuesday Morning (Du big bang à mardi matin), which was both a Genie Award nominee for Best Animated Short Film at the 21st Genie Awards, and a Jutra Award nominee for Best Animated Short Film at the 3rd Jutra Awards.

His 2007 short Sleeping Betty (Isabelle au bois dormant) is a humorous Sleeping Beauty adaptation that received numerous international and Canadian awards including the Genie and the Jutra. His 2015 short Carface (Auto Portraits), received the Prix Guy-L.-Coté Best Canadian Animation Film at Sommets du cinéma d'animation in Montreal and was shortlisted for an Academy Award nomination.

Cloutier has said that in his youth, it was his dream to be an animated filmmaker and that when he began working as an illustrator, he did so with the hope of transitioning into animation. He worked most notably as an illustrator with the now-defunct Quebec satirical magazine Croc, with two comic book-style series, La légende des Jean-Guy and Gilles la Jungle contre Méchant-Man. His entry into animation came when an NFB producer asked if he wished to adapt La légende des Jean-Guy into an animated short, which became The Persistent Peddler.

The summer of 2015, Cloutier did a two-week "Frame x Frame" exhibition at the Musée de la civilisation in Quebec City, where the public could watch him working on his next film. He says he begins working with paper and ink: "I draw on paper with brush, India ink and water, for nuance and half-tones. After that, it's colored by computer. I like to draw on paper. I'm old-school."

== Filmography ==
- The Persistent Peddler (Le colporteur) - 1988
- Mirrors of Time - 1991
- Overdose - 1995
- Science Please! (Une minute de science, s.v.p.!) - 1998–2000
  - The Wind (Le Vent)
  - Wheel Meets Friction (La roue contre la friction)
  - Slippery Ice! (La glace glisse)
  - The Force of Water (La force de l'eau)
  - The Wonderful World of Colour (Le monde merveilleux de la couleur)
  - The Internal Combustion Engine (Le moteur à explosion)
- From the Big Bang to Tuesday Morning (Du big bang à mardi matin) - 2000
- The Trenches (La Tranchée) - 2001
- Sleeping Betty (Isabelle au bois dormant) - 2007
- Carface (Autos portraits) - 2015
- Bad Seeds (Mauvaises herbes) - 2021
