= Raquel Sancinetti =

Brazilian-Canadian filmmaker

Raquel Sancinetti is a Brazilian-Canadian animator. She is most noted for her 2023 film Madeleine, which won the Prix Iris for Best Animated Short Film at the 25th Quebec Cinema Awards in 2023 and the Canadian Screen Award for Best Short Documentary at the 12th Canadian Screen Awards in 2024.

She worked in visual effects on Brazilian films before moving to Canada to study animation at Concordia University's Mel Hoppenheim School of Cinema.

Madeleine was also named to the Toronto International Film Festival's annual Canada's Top Ten list for 2023.
