= Harvey (2023 film) =

- Directed by: Janice Nadeau
- Written by: Janice Nadeau
- Produced by: Marc Bertrand
- Starring: Laurent Lemaire
- Edited by: Oana Suteu Khintirian
- Music by: Martin Léon
- Production companies: National Film Board of Canada; Folimage
- Release date: January 2023 (Clermont-Ferrand)
- Running time: 9 minutes
- Country: Canada
- Language: French

Harvey is a 2023 Canadian short animated film directed by Janice Nadeau. Adapted from the Governor General's Literary Award-winning book of the same name, which was illustrated by Nadeau and written by Hervé Bouchard, the film centres on a young boy who is using his vivid imagination to cope with the death of his father.

The film premiered at the 2023 Clermont-Ferrand International Short Film Festival.

The film received a Prix Iris nomination for Best Animated Short Film at the 25th Quebec Cinema Awards in 2023.
