= Bydlo (film) =

- Directed by: Patrick Bouchard
- Written by: Cynthia Tremblay
- Produced by: Julie Roy
- Cinematography: Pierre Mignot
- Edited by: Alain Baril; Stéphane Lafleur
- Music by: Robert Marcel Lepage
- Production company: National Film Board of Canada
- Release date: June 5, 2012 (Annecy)
- Running time: 9 minutes
- Country: Canada

Bydlo is a Canadian animated short film, directed by Patrick Bouchard and released in 2012. Inspired by the fourth movement of Modest Mussorgsky's classical composition Pictures at an Exhibition, the stop-motion animated film depicts a group of men who are plowing a field with an ox, but overwork both themselves and the animal virtually to the point of death.

The film premiered at the Annecy International Animated Film Festival in June 2012.

The film was named to TIFF's annual year-end Canada's Top Ten list for 2012, and won the Prix Jutra for Best Animated Short Film at the 15th Jutra Awards. It was an Annie Award nominee for Best Animated Short Subject at the 40th Annie Awards, and a Canadian Screen Award nominee for Best Animated Short at the 1st Canadian Screen Awards.
