= The Subject (2018 film) =

- French: Le Sujet
- Directed by: Patrick Bouchard
- Written by: Patrick Bouchard
- Produced by: Julie Roy
- Edited by: Theodore Ushev
- Music by: Patrick Bouchard
- Production company: National Film Board of Canada
- Release date: May 17, 2018 (Cannes)
- Running time: 10 minutes
- Country: Canada
- Language: French

The Subject (French: Le sujet) is a Canadian animated short film, directed by Patrick Bouchard and released in 2018. An exploration of the creative process, the film features Bouchard performing a dissection on a model of his own body.

The film premiered at the 2018 Cannes Film Festival, in the Director's Fortnight stream. It was the only Canadian film screened at Cannes in 2018.

The film was named to the Toronto International Film Festival's annual year-end Canada's Top Ten list for 2018. It received a Canadian Screen Award nomination for Best Animated Short Film at the 7th Canadian Screen Awards in 2019, and won the Prix Iris for Best Animated Short Film at the 21st Quebec Cinema Awards.
