= Carface =

- French: Autos Portraits
- Directed by: Claude Cloutier
- Produced by: Julie Roy
- Edited by: Michel Pelland
- Music by: Jean-Philippe Goncalves
- Production company: National Film Board of Canada
- Release date: June 15, 2015
- Running time: 4 minutes
- Country: Canada

Carface (French: Autos Portraits) is a 2015 National Film Board of Canada animated short film by Claude Cloutier in which cars sing and dance while the Earth slides toward environmental ruin.

== Summary ==
The film's central character is a 1957 Chevrolet Bel Air that sings "Que Sera, Sera (Whatever Will Be, Will Be)."

== Accolades ==
The film received the Prix Guy-L.-Coté Best Canadian Animation Film at the Sommets du cinéma d'animation in Montreal, and was selected as one of Canada's submissions for the Academy Award for Best Animated Short Film. The film was a Canadian Screen Award nominee for Best Animated Short Film at the 4th Canadian Screen Awards, and won the Québec Cinéma Award for Best Animated Short Film at the 18th Quebec Cinema Awards. It also won a Golden Sheaf Award for Best Animation at the 2016 Yorkton Film Festival.
