= From the Big Bang to Tuesday Morning =

- French: Du big bang à mardi matin
- Directed by: Claude Cloutier
- Written by: Claude Cloutier
- Produced by: Thérèse Descary; Marcel Jean; Jean-Jacques Leduc
- Edited by: Sophie Leblond
- Music by: Pierre Desrochers
- Production company: National Film Board of Canada
- Release date: 2000
- Running time: 5 minutes
- Country: Canada

From the Big Bang to Tuesday Morning (French: Du big bang à mardi matin) is a Canadian animated short film, directed by Claude Cloutier and released in 2000. The film tells the story of the evolution of life on earth in five minutes, through rapid brush-drawn morph animation reminiscent of aquatint prints.

The film received a Genie Award nomination for Best Animated Short Film at the 21st Genie Awards, and a Jutra Award nomination for Best Animated Short Film at the 3rd Jutra Awards.
