= Before My Heart Falls =

2012 film

- Film poster
- French: Avant que mon cœur bascule
- Directed by: Sébastien Rose
- Written by: Stéfanie Lasnier; Sébastien Rose
- Produced by: Paul Barbeau
- Starring: Clémence Dufresne-Deslières; Sophie Lorain; Sébastien Ricard
- Cinematography: Nicolas Bolduc
- Edited by: Philippe Melançon
- Production company: Reprise Films
- Release date: September 14, 2012 (FCVQ)
- Running time: 96 minutes
- Country: Canada
- Language: French

Before My Heart Falls (French: Avant que mon cœur bascule) is a Canadian drama film, directed by Sébastien Rose and released in 2012. The film centres on Sarah (Clémence Dufresne-Deslières), a young con artist who regularly fakes a crisis on the side of the road so that she can rob men who stop to help her; however, after one of her cons results in a man's accidental death, she befriends the man's grieving widow Françoise (Sophie Lorain) while simultaneously trying to maintain her relationship with her crime boss Ji-Guy (Sébastien Ricard).

The film premiered on September 14, 2012, at the Quebec City Film Festival, before opening commercially on November 12.

Brendan Kelly of the Montreal Gazette gave the film a mixed review, praising Dufresne-Deslières's performance as a "force of nature" but concluding that the film ultimately "just doesn't have the emotional punch it should have".

The film received two Prix Jutra nominations at the 15th Jutra Awards in 2013, for Best Supporting Actor (Ricard) and Best Supporting Actress (Lorain).

The film was broadcast by Ici Radio-Canada Télé in 2019.
