= The Trenches =

2010 Canadian film by Claude Cloutier

- French: La Tranchée
- Directed by: Claude Cloutier
- Written by: Claude Cloutier
- Produced by: Marc Bertrand
- Edited by: José Heppell
- Animation by: Claude Cloutier
- Production company: National Film Board of Canada
- Release date: June 2, 2010 (Animafest)
- Running time: 6 minutes
- Country: Canada

The Trenches (French: La Tranchée) is a Canadian animated short film, written, directed and animated by Claude Cloutier for the National Film Board of Canada. The film is a portrait of soldiers fighting in the trenches during World War I.

The film premiered in June 2010 at Animafest Zagreb, and had its Canadian premiere at the 2010 Toronto International Film Festival.

The film was a Genie Award nominee for Best Animated Short Film at the 31st Genie Awards in 2011.
