= A Night for the Dogs =

- Directed by: Max Woodward
- Written by: Max Woodward
- Produced by: Camille Lequenne; Guillaume Dubois
- Starring: Max Woodward; Patrick Hivon
- Edited by: Adam Abouaccar
- Music by: Stephen Menold
- Animation by: Max Woodward; Bogdan Anifrani
- Production company: Confettis Production
- Distributed by: h264 Distribution
- Release date: 2022
- Running time: 15 minutes
- Country: Canada
- Languages: English; French

A Night for the Dogs is a Canadian short animated film, directed by Max Woodward and released in 2022. The film centres on a group of residents of an apartment building that is on fire; as they wait on the street while firefighters battle the blaze, they gradually transform into a pack of wild dogs as they take out their anger on the neighbour who was responsible.

The film was released in both English and French, with the English version narrated by Woodward and the French version narrated by Patrick Hivon.

The film was a Prix Iris nominee for Best Animated Short Film at the 25th Quebec Cinema Awards in 2023.
