= Dimitri Storoge =

French actor (born 1977)

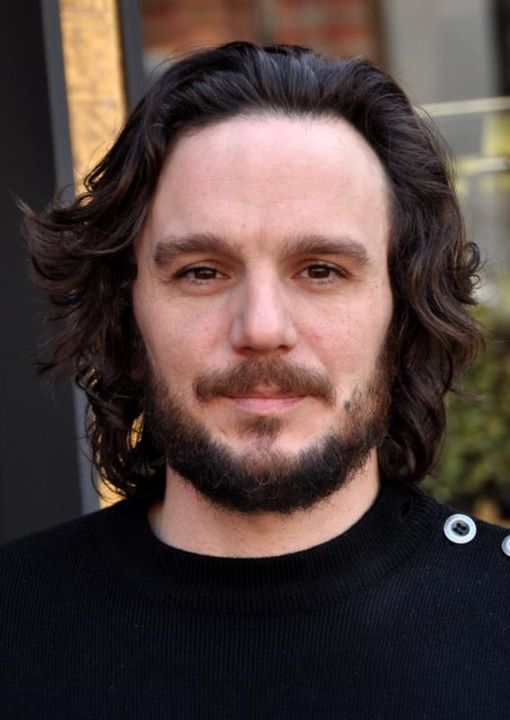
- Born: 26 July 1977 (age 49)
- Occupation: actor
- Notable work: Through the Mist, A Gang Story

Dimitri Storoge (born 26 July 1977) is a French actor. He is most noted for his performances as Patrick Esposito Di Napoli in the film Through the Mist (Dédé, à travers les brumes), for which he received a Jutra Award nomination for Best Supporting Actor at the 12th Jutra Awards in 2010, and as the young Edmond Vidal in A Gang Story (Les Lyonnais), for which he was a César Award nominee for Most Promising Actor at the 37th César Awards in 2012.

He was previously in a relationship with actress and television host Virginie de Clausade.

== Filmography ==
Year	Title	Role	Notes
2000	Franck Spadone	The Expert	
2003	Not For, or Against (Ni pour, ni contre (bien au contraire)	Loulou	
2009	Through the Mist (Dédé, à travers les brumes)	Patrick Esposito Di Napoli	
2011	Nuit #1	Nikolai	
2013	Belle and Sebastian (Belle et Sébastien)	Docteur Guillaume	
2015	Made in France	Hassan	
2015	The Scent of Mandarin (L'Odeur de la mandarine)	Léonard	
2016	The Visitors: Bastille Day (Les Visiteurs: La Révolution)	Commissaire Verdier	
2019	Osmosis	Mathieu Christo	TV series
2020	Resistance	Vichy Officer	
2020	La Révolution	Edmond de Pérouse	TV series
2022	The Takedown (Loin du périph)	Brunner	
2022	Notre-Dame on Fire (Notre-Dame brûle)	Capt. Francis	
2022	Parallels (Parallèles)	Hervé Chassangre	
