= Jean-François Lévesque =

Canadian animator from Quebec

Jean-François Lévesque is a Canadian animator from Quebec. He is most noted for his 2008 short film The Necktie (Le noeud cravate), which won the Prix Jutra for Best Animated Short Film at the 11th Jutra Awards in 2009, and his 2020 short film I, Barnabé (Moi, Barnabé), which was a Canadian Screen Award nominee for Best Animated Short at the 9th Canadian Screen Awards in 2020.

Originally from Saint-Gabriel, Quebec, Lévesque lives and works principally in Montreal. As a child, he had participated in animation workshops in the Carrousel international du film de Rimouski children's film festival; in 2009, he was named its honorary co-president.
