= Patrick Doyon =

Canadian animator

- Born: May 17, 1979 (age 47); Montreal, Quebec, Canada
- Education: Université du Québec à Montréal
- Known for: Illustrator; Animator

Patrick Doyon is a Canadian animator and illustrator, based in Montreal, Quebec.

== Dimanche ==
On January 24, 2012, he was nominated for an Academy Award for the animated short film Sunday (Dimanche), which was inspired by his experiences growing up in Desbiens, Quebec. Still learning how to use computer animation tools, he worked with pen and pencil to create Dimanche, hand drawing the entire film. While 10-minute film took him two years to complete, working in this manner, Doyon believes such traditional animation techniques are better for portraying emotion. Dimanche is his first professional film.

== Earlier films ==
Doyon had previously created a three-minute animated short Square Roots in 2006, while enrolled in the NFB's Hothouse program for young animators, as well as a 2002 experimental short, 32:11, which was screened at Animafest Zagreb and the Ottawa International Animation Festival.

== Illustration and graphic design ==
In addition to his film work, Doyon is a book and magazine illustrator who has received the 2008 Applied Arts Magazine Illustration Award and a LUX award in 2009 for his editorial illustrations. He has a degree in graphic design from the Université du Québec à Montréal.
