= Samer Najari =

Canadian filmmaker

Samer Najari (born 1976) is a Canadian filmmaker, who works predominantly but not exclusively with his wife Dominique Chila. They are most noted for their 2013 feature film Arwad.

Born in Moscow to a Syrian father and a Lebanese mother, Najari moved to Canada in 1994. His 2009 short film Snow Hides the Shade of Fig Trees (La neige cache l'ombre des figuiers), won the AQCC award for Best Short Film (Fiction) at the 2010 Rendez-vous du cinéma québécois, and was a Jutra Award nominee for Best Live Action Short Film at the 12th Jutra Awards.

Rituals Under a Scarlet Sky (Rituels sous un ciel écarlate), his 2024 short film directed with Chila, was a finalist for the short films category at the Prix collégial du cinéma québécois, and received a Quebec Cinema Award nomination for Best Live Action Short Film at the 27th Quebec Cinema Awards.
