= Dominique Chila =

Canadian actress

Dominique Chila (born 1974) is a Canadian actress and filmmaker, who works predominantly but not exclusively with her husband Samer Najari. They are most noted for their 2013 feature film Arwad.

Their 2024 short film Rituals Under a Scarlet Sky (Rituels sous un ciel écarlate) was a finalist for the short films category at the Prix collégial du cinéma québécois, and received a Quebec Cinema Award nomination for Best Live Action Short Film at the 27th Quebec Cinema Awards.
