= Janice Nadeau =

Canadian illustrator, art director and animation director

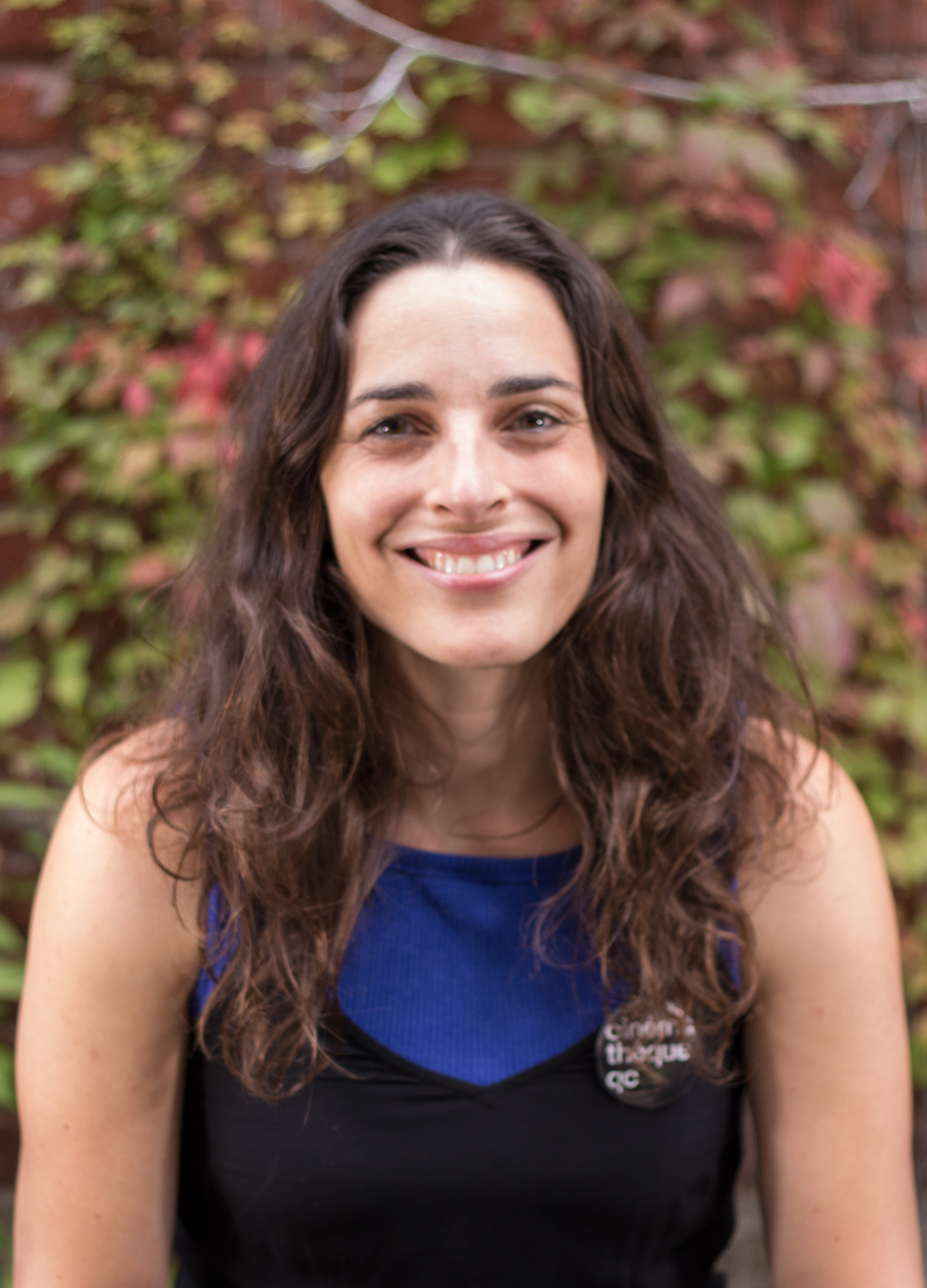
- Nadeau in 2017
- Born: Janice Nadeau; Gatineau, Quebec, Canada
- Occupations: Illustrator, art director and animation director
- Years active: 2002–present
- Website: www.janicenadeau.com

Janice Nadeau is a Canadian illustrator, art director and animation director.

== Biography ==
A native of Gatineau, Quebec, Nadeau studied graphic design at Université du Québec à Montréal and illustration at École supérieure des arts décoratifs in Strasbourg. In 2005, she created the illustrations for Corteo, Cirque du Soleil's international touring show.

She has taught illustration at the School of Design of the Université du Québec à Montréal.

=== Literature ===
She has written and illustrated a number of books. She is a three-time winner of the French-language children's illustration award, winning at the 2004 Governor General's Awards for Nul poisson où aller, the 2008 Governor General's Awards for Ma meilleure amie, and the 2009 Governor General's Awards for Harvey.

=== Animation ===
In 2014, she co-directed No Fish Where to Go, an animated short film adaptation of Nul poisson où aller, for the National Film Board of Canada. The film won the International Film Critics Awards (the FIPRESCI Prize) at the Annecy International Animated Film Festival, and was a Jutra Award nominee for Best Animated Short Film at the 17th Jutra Awards in 2015.

Nadeau's next film was Mamie, written and directed for the French production company Folimage in co-production with the NFB. The film was a Canadian Screen Award nominee for Best Animated Short Film at the 5th Canadian Screen Awards, and a Prix Iris nominee for Best Animated Short Film at the 19th Quebec Cinema Awards.

In 2023 she directed Harvey, an adaptation of the book, which was a Prix Iris nominee for Best Animated Short Film at the 25th Quebec Cinema Awards in 2023.
