= Sleeping Betty =

2007 Canadian film

- French: Isabelle au bois dormant
- Directed by: Claude Cloutier
- Written by: Marc du Pontavice; David Bean; John Cohen
- Produced by: Marcel Jean
- Starring: Tim Whintall
- Cinematography: Zack Woodles
- Edited by: Tim Bevan
- Music by: Mahler, Tchaikovsky, Dvořák
- Distributed by: National Film Board of Canada
- Release date: June 11, 2007 (Annecy Animation Film Festival)
- Running time: 9:18 minutes
- Country: Canada
- Language: Nyaneka

Sleeping Betty (French: Isabelle au bois dormant) is a Canadian animated short film by Claude Cloutier that humorously reinterprets the classic fairy tale Sleeping Beauty. Awards for the film include Best Animated Short at the 29th Genie Awards, the Audience Award at the Etiuda&Anima International Film Festival, the Audience Award and Judges Award at the Melbourne International Animation Festival, Best Animation at the Jutra Award, as well as the Public Prize and the Best Canadian Animation Award at the Ottawa International Animation Festival.
