= They Dance With Their Heads =

- Directed by: Thomas Corriveau
- Produced by: Thomas Corriveau
- Starring: Marc Béland
- Edited by: Thomas Corriveau
- Music by: Guido Del Fabbro
- Release date: June 2021 (Annecy)
- Running time: 8 minutes
- Country: Canada

They Dance With Their Heads (French: Ils dansent avec leurs têtes) is a Canadian short animated film, directed by Thomas Corriveau and released in 2021. An experiment in the animation of dance, the film opens with a slow zoom into an island occupied by the disembodied head of a choreographer, who comes back to life and articulates an artistic philosophy voiced by actor and dancer Marc Béland, before various dancers begin to perform.

The film premiered at the 2021 Annecy International Animation Film Festival.

The film received a Prix Iris nomination for Best Animated Short Film at the 24th Quebec Cinema Awards in 2022.
