= Julie McClemens =

Canadian actress

Julie McClemens is a Canadian actress and comedian. She has acted on radio, stage and TV and in film. She won a Prix Gémeaux in 2002 for best actress in a drama, followed by another in 2004 for best supporting actress in a drama.

== Early life and education ==
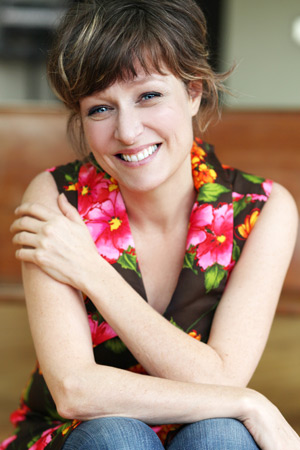
Julie McClemens

McClemens was born on 26 September 1969. She is of Irish descent through her father. She was a native of Jonquiere and studied ballet before attending Collège Lionel-Groulx, a sixth-form college, where she majored in theatre. She obtained her diploma in 1990.

== Career ==
After graduating, she starred in two short films and joined the touring cast of the play Tu Peux Toujours Danser (You Can Always Dance). Her first TV role was as Cecile in 1992 in the TV series Ville Ouverte.

In 1995, McClemens starred on stage in Claude Poissant's production of Marivaux's Le Triomphe de l'Amour (Triumph of Love). In 1996, McClemens played the publisher, Dawn, in The Passage from Indiana (1996) at the Théâtre du Nouveau Monde (New World Theatre) and the Ubu Theatre.

McClemens also played Marie for three seasons on the popular TV show La vie, la vie on Radio-Canada from 2001 to 2002. In 2004, she played opposite Pascale Montpetit in Claude Poissant's La Fausse Suivante and the Théâtre du Nouveau Monde.

In 2016, McClemens played the mother of The Boy with the Vanishing Face at La Licorne Theatre (Théâtre La Licorne).

McClemens played Madame Pin-Pon in the children's play Le bain over 150 times.

== Critical reception ==
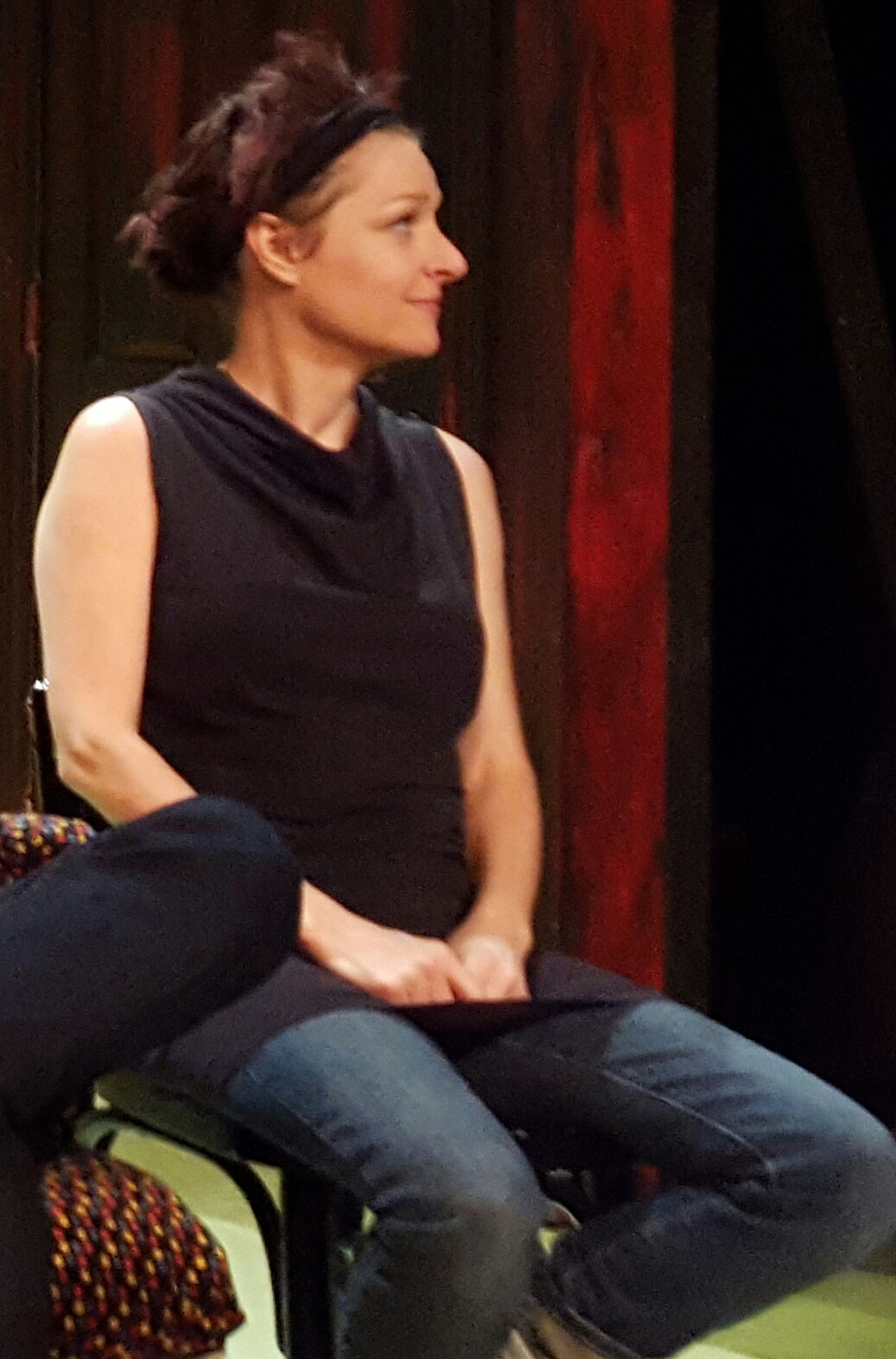
Julie McClemens at the Licorne Theatre

Of her turn in Passage de l'Indiana (1996) at the Théâtre du Nouveau Monde and the Ubu Theatre, La Nouvelliste noted that she was "slightly overshadowed" by the other two actors; her performance was "more subdued..[but] no less interesting".

Of her performance in Claude Poissant's La Fausse Suivante, Le Devoir called it "Lively and graceful, Julie McClemens proves...to be the one who best masters Marivaux's brilliant language: her delicate, ethereal delivery highlights both the intentions and all the subtlety."

The Gazette called her a "revelation" in the TV series Ville Ouverte "Exuberant, spirited..., Cécile heats up the story whenever it focuses on her."

== Awards and honours ==
- 1993 - Newcomer of the Year by the Association of Theatre Critics for the role of Hortense in Le Prince travesti
- 2002 - Prix Gémeaux for best actress in a drama for her role as Marie in La vie, la vie
- 2004 - Prix Gémeaux for best supporting actress in a drama for her role as Stéphanie Ferron in Grande Ourse
- 2005 - Aubagne International Film Festival Meilleure for best actress in short film for her role as Pascale in Un ange passe

== Filmography ==
- Luc Picard
- The United States of Albert [Les États-Unis d'Albert] (2005)
- Arwad (2013)
