= Sunday (2011 film) =

- Film poster
- French: Dimanche
- Directed by: Patrick Doyon
- Written by: Patrick Doyon
- Produced by: Marc Bertrand; Michael Fukushima
- Starring: Chantal Baril; Natalie Hamel Roy; Jacques Lavallée; François Sasseville; Nicolas Scott
- Edited by: Jelena Popovic
- Music by: Luigi Allemano
- Production company: National Film Board of Canada
- Release dates: February 2011 (Berlin); January 5, 2012 (online)
- Running time: 10 minutes
- Country: Canada
- Language: French

Sunday (French: Dimanche) is a Canadian animated short film by Patrick Doyon. The film debuted at the Berlin International Film Festival in February 2011 and online on January 5, 2012.

Dimanche is the first professional film by Doyon, a native of Montreal. Doyon had previously created a three-minute animated short Square Roots in 2006, while enrolled in the NFB's Hothouse program for young animators.

Still learning how to use computer animation tools, he worked with pen and pencil to create Dimanche, hand drawing the entire film. The 10-minute film took him two years to complete, creating individual drawings on paper, working on a light table. Doyon ended up with 15 boxes full of sheets with sketches, which he then scanned into the computer, colourized and began editing. Doyon believes such traditional animation techniques are better for portraying emotion.

== Awards ==
The film was nominated Best Animated Short Film at the 84th Academy Awards as well as Best Animated Short Subject at the 39th Annie Awards. It also received the ASIFA-Colorado Award for the Best Animated Short at the 34th Denver Film Festival. It also received Quebec’s Prix Jutra for best animated short.

== Plot ==
Dimanche tells the story of a young boy who goes to his grandparents' house in a small town in Quebec after church on Sunday. Bored with the adult world, he wanders outside to indulge his hobby of creating elongated coins by placing them on train tracks. A bear that his grandfather shot years ago walks out onto the tracks, and is crushed by an oncoming train. The bear is gone, and the boy goes home with his parents. Doyon has said that the film is inspired by his youth in Desbiens, Quebec.
