= Éléonore Goldberg =

French-Canadian writer and artist

Éléonore Goldberg is a French-Canadian writer and artist based in Quebec. She is most noted for her 2019 novel Maison fauve, which was a shortlisted finalist for the Governor General's Award for French-language fiction at the 2019 Governor General's Awards, and her 2020 animated short film Hibiscus Season (La saison des hibiscus), which won the Prix Iris for Best Animated Film at the 22nd Quebec Cinema Awards in 2021.

Born in France, Goldberg spent part of her childhood living in Zaire with her family.
