= Michèle Cournoyer =

Canadian animator (born 1943)

Michèle Cournoyer Michèle Cournoyer
- Born: November 14, 1943 (age 82); Saint-Joseph-de-Sorel, Quebec, Canada
- Known for: Animation
- Awards: Governor General’s Award in Visual and Media Arts

Michèle Cournoyer (born November 14, 1943) is a Canadian animator who on March 1, 2017, received a Governor General’s Award in Visual and Media Arts for her body of work.

== Early life ==
Born in Saint-Joseph-de-Sorel, Quebec, Cournoyer began drawing at the age of five, and started painting at 12 when she was hospitalized, and her father bought her an oil paint set. At the age of 17, she had to halt her art education when her mother became ill, with Cournoyer caring for her ailing mother and the family. Her mother died when Cournoyer was 20 years of age. After two years studying in Quebec City, she moved to Montreal, then to London to study graphic arts. Studying in London during the 1960s, she was influenced by Pop Art, the Dada movement and surrealism. During the 1970s, she worked as a set designer, art director, costume designer and screenwriter for several Quebec-based film companies.

== Independent film and animation work ==
Her first animation film, Papa! Papa! Papa! (L'Homme et l'enfant), came about when a friend had a baby and Cournoyer, fascinated by the relationship between parent and child, created a photography flip book that would evolve into this film. Her 1973 short Alfredo was made during her time in Italy. Upon returning to Quebec, she worked in film as a set designer, art director, costume designer and screenwriter, with credits on such films as Mireille Dansereau's La vie rêvée (1972) and L'arrache-coeur (1979), as well as Gilles Carle's La Mort d’un bûcheron (1973). She also made her independent films Spaghettata, Toccata, Old Orchard Beach, P.Q., and Dolorosa.

== Working with the NFB ==
In 1989, Cournoyer won the National Film Board of Canada's French Animation Studio's 9th Cinéaste recherché competition in 1989, leading to the completion of her first NFB animated short A Feather Tale. Her films with the NFB have explored powerful themes. The Hat is a film about incest that was part of the International Critics' Week during the Cannes Film Festival, and was ranked as one of the 100 Best Animated Films of All Time in Variety 2005 survey. Accordion deals with sexuality, while Robes of War looks at terrorism and religion through a female suicide bomber. Her 2014 film, Soif, explores alcoholism.

== Technique ==
While she has experimented with computerization in such works as An Artist (1994), Cournoyer usually uses traditional animation methods. The Hat, which started on a computer, was completed by her on paper. Soif, an ink-on-paper film, took her four years, with 10,000 drawings required to arrive at the final 1,800 used in the film. She traditionally makes her drawings in pen with black ink, on white pages in black note books.

== Filmography ==
- Papa! Papa! Papa! (L'Homme et l'enfant), 1969
- Alfredo, 1973
- Spaghettata (co-directed with Jacques Drouin), 1976
- La Toccata, 1976
- Old Orchard Beach P. Q., 1981
- Dolorasa, 1988
- A Feather Tale (La Basse-cour), 1992
- An Artist (Une Artiste), 1994
- The Hat (Le Chapeau), 1999
- The Accordion, 2004
- Robes of War (Robe de guerre), 2008
- Soif, 2014

== Honours ==
In 2015, she was the subjective of a special retrospective and art exhibition at the Ottawa International Animation Film Festival. On February 27, Cournoyer was announced as a recipient of a 2017 Governor General's Award in Visual and Media Arts.
