= Patrick Bouchard =

Canadian animator

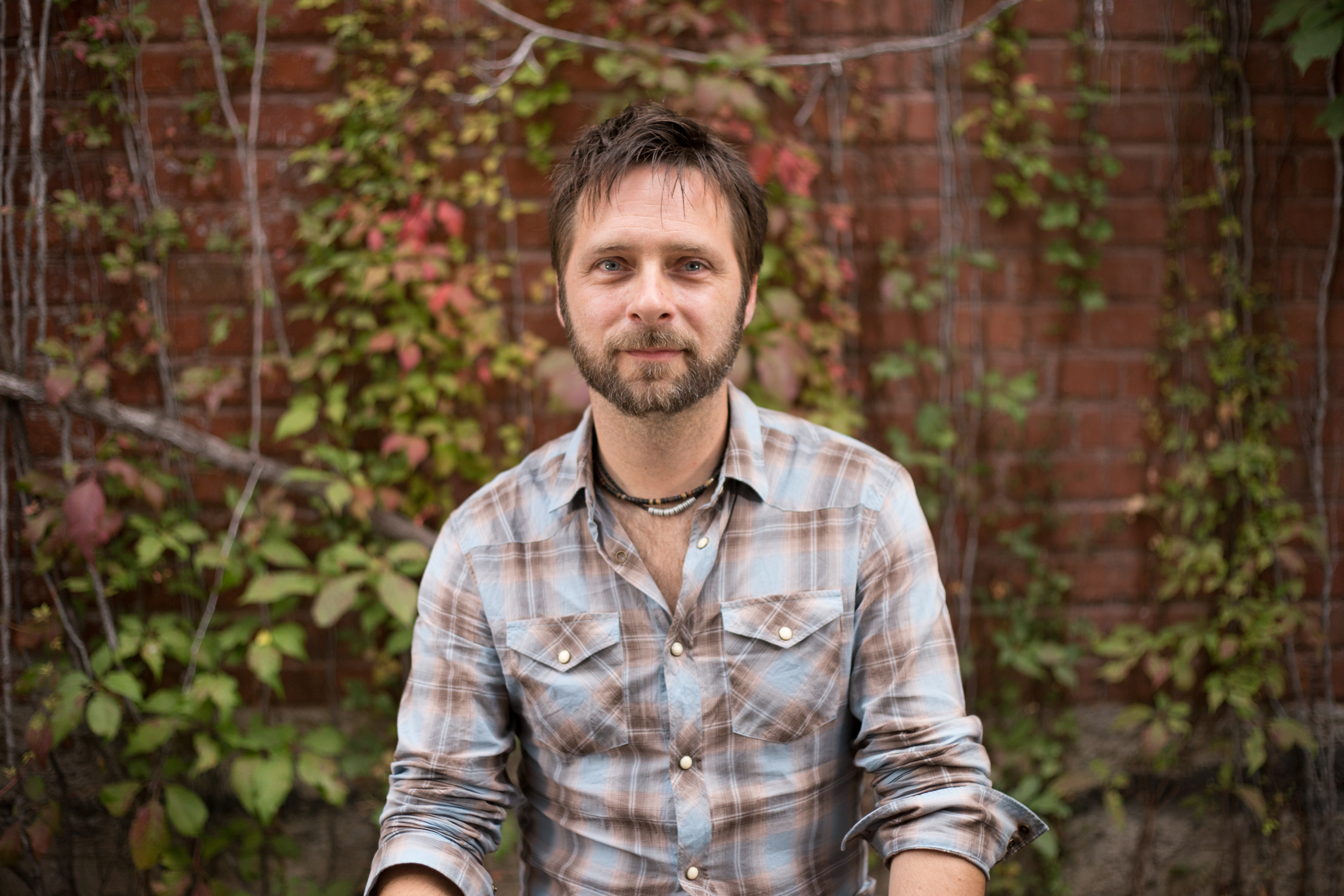
- Born: 1974; Saguenay, Quebec, Canada
- Occupation: animator
- Years active: 1990s-present
- Notable work: Bydlo, The Subject

Patrick Bouchard (born 1974 in Saguenay, Quebec) is a Canadian animator. A graduate of the Université du Québec à Chicoutimi, he made his first animated film Jean Leviériste while attending that institution.

He is a four-time winner of the Prix Jutra/Prix Iris for Best Animated Short Film for his films The Brainwashers (2003), Dehors novembre (2006), Bydlo (2012) and The Subject (2018), and a three-time Genie Award and Canadian Screen Award nominee for Best Animated Short Film, for Dehors novembre, Bydlo and The Subject.

== Filmography ==
- 1996: Jean Leviériste
- 2002: The Brainwashers (Les Ramoneurs cérébraux)
- 2005: Dehors novembre
- 2007: Talon d'argile
- 2007: Subservience (Révérence)
- 2012: Bydlo
- 2018: The Subject (Le Sujet)
