= Les Colocs =

Canadian rock band

- Origin: Montreal, Quebec, Canada
- Genres: Alternative rock, blues, swing revival, Senegalese music
- Years active: 1990–2000
- Labels: BMG; Musicomptoir
- Past members: Dédé Fortin; Patrick Esposito Di Napoli; Mike Sawatzky; Serge Robert; Jimmy Bourgoing; André Vanderbiest
- Website: colocs.qc.ca

Les Colocs (The Roommates) were a Quebec rock band formed in Montreal in 1990 by singer-songwriter André "Dédé" Fortin. Known for their energetic performances and eclectic fusion of musical styles, they blended rock with folk, swing, blues, and world music. Their lyrics, written in Quebec French, addressed social themes such as poverty, homelessness, HIV/AIDS, and consumerism while maintaining a lighthearted and humorous public image, which contributed to their widespread appeal.

== History ==
The band gained prominence with their self-titled debut album, selling over 60,000 copies and establishing a reputation for combining sharp social commentary with catchy melodies. Despite frequent lineup changes, Fortin and guitarist Mike Sawatzky remained the core members. Following their 1995 album Atrocetomique, they expanded their sound by collaborating with Senegalese musicians the Diouf brothers on Dehors novembre (1998), an album noted for its introspective themes.

Although often perceived as a "party band," Fortin later emphasized the importance of his lyrics, aiming to balance entertainment with social critique. He believed in writing from personal experience to create universally relatable songs, a method evident in tracks like "La rue principale" and "Juste une p’tite nuite".

Fortin died by suicide on May 8, 2000, effectively ending the band. The remaining members released a final album, Suite 2116, before disbanding. Despite their relatively short career, Les Colocs remain an influential part of Quebec's music history, recognized for their blend of social commentary and musical innovation.

== Members ==
- Dédé Fortin (songwriting, vocals, guitar, drums, etc.)
- Mike Sawatzky (guitar, saxophone & harmonica)
- Serge Robert (double bass; later known as Mononc' Serge, quit after "Atrocetomique" for a solo career)
- André Vanderbiest (double bass; replaced Serge Robert)
- Patrick Esposito Di Napoli (harmonica; died of AIDS in 1994)
- Justin Allard (drums, replaced Jimmy Bourgoing)
- Jean-Denis Levasseur (clarinet & saxophone; joined for "Dehors novembre")

== Additional associated musicians ==
- Louis Léger (guitar)
- Cameron delay (guitar)
- Mara Tremblay (violin)
- Joel Zifkin (violin)
- Guy Bélanger (harmonica)
- Benoît Gagné (trombone)
- Benoît Piché (trumpet)
- Élage Diouf|El Hadji Fall Diouf (singer and percussionist)
- Pape Abdou Karim Diouf (singer and percussionist)
- Michel Dufour (drums)

== Discography ==
=== Albums ===
- Les Colocs (1993)
- Atrocetomique (live; 1995)
- Dehors novembre (1998)
- Les années 1992-1995 (compilation; 2001)
- Suite 2116 (posthumous; 2001)
- Live 1993-1998 (live compilation; 2004)
- Il me parle de bonheur (2009)

== Videography ==
- Les Colocs: L'integrale 1993-2000

== See also ==
1. Canadian rock
2. Culture of Quebec
3. List of bands from Canada
4. Music of Quebec
5. Rock music of Canada
