= Dédé Fortin =

Canadian musician (1962-2000)

- Born: André Fortin; 17 November 1962; Saint-Thomas-Didyme, Quebec, Canada
- Died: 8 May 2000 (aged 37) Montreal, Quebec, Canada
- Genres: Folk rock, Ska/Reggae, Blues rock
- Occupations: Musician, songwriter
- Instruments: Vocals, violin, guitar
- Years active: 1990–2000
- Website: fondationandrededefortin.com (Archived from the original 24 March 2012.)

André "Dédé" Fortin (French pronunciation: [ɑ̃dʁe dede fɔʁtɛ̃]; 17 November 1962 – 8 May 2000) was a founding member, frontman, and guitarist of the Québécois band Les Colocs, formed in 1990.

Born in rural Quebec, André "Dédé" Fortin was the tenth of eleven children. After studying cinema at the Université de Montréal, he formed the folk-rock band Les Colocs in 1990. The band's music addressed serious issues such as poverty, loss of community, and drug dependence. Fortin was also an activist for Quebec sovereignty, campaigning for the "Yes" side in the 1995 Quebec referendum. The last LP from Les Colocs, Dehors Novembre, won the Félix Award for Rock Album of the Year.

Fortin struggled with depression and died by suicide in 2000. His legacy includes the renaming of a street in his hometown, a biographical film, and the Fondation Andre Dédé Fortin, which focuses on depression education and suicide prevention.

== Early life ==
Fortin was born to Alfred Fortin and Gisèle Tremblay on a farm near the small village of Saint-Thomas-Didyme, outside of Saguenay, in Lac-Saint-Jean region of Quebec. He was the tenth of eleven children. When he was eight, the family moved to Normandin, but he always valued his childhood home. Fortin attended public schools and studied cinema at the Université de Montréal with his friend Éric Henry.

== Les Colocs ==
Fortin was long interested in music and started writing song lyrics. In 1990, he formed Les Colocs, after meeting Patrick Esposito Di Napoli and a couple of the other band members. The music they wrote, recorded and performed was a folk rock sound, emerging from Québécois music, with ska back beats and several other genres of music. They released their first album in 1993 to great acclaim. Les Colocs' festive melodies often hid more serious issues which Fortin addressed in his lyrics, such as poverty (Passe-moé la puck), loss of community (La rue principale), emotional dependence (Juste une p'tite nuite), and drug dependence (Tassez-vous de d'là). During this period Fortin was instrumental in the making of several Félix Award-winning music videos for Les Colocs.

Fortin was a passionate believer in and activist for Quebec sovereignty. He campaigned for the OUI ("Yes") side during the run-up to the 1995 Quebec referendum, and his band Les Colocs performed at partisan meetings. He was deeply affected by the 1994 death due to AIDS-related complications of bandmate and friend Patrick Esposito Di Napoli, and Fortin struggled with depression in the ensuing years.

Dehors Novembre (1998), the last LP from the group, was written and performed with the help of the Diouf brothers, whose background from Senegal added a new element to the band's music. It has become Fortin and the band's most celebrated work, and it won the Félix Award for the Rock Album of the Year.

== Death and legacy ==
On 8 May 2000, Fortin died by suicide at his apartment. The day before, the Colocs manager Raymond Paquin had received a poem by Fortin. He published it posthumously in La Presse. Several years later, the remaining members of the band recovered a CD with the original song recorded from this poem by Dédé himself; they made their own version, which they released in 2009. For days afterwards, fans left flowers and messages in his memory at his building on Rachel Street, in the Plateau neighborhood of Montreal.

Fortin has been remembered in different ways:

- Saint-Thomas-Didyme, where Fortin was born, renamed Rang Saint-Henri as "Chemin Dédé-Fortin" in his honor in 2006.
- In 2009, a film about Fortin's life, entitled Through the Mist (Dédé à travers les brumes), was released, starring Sébastien Ricard as Fortin.
- The Fondation Andre Dédé Fortin was established to educate about depression and prevent suicides; it has established a 24-hour crisis line and conducts workshops to help people in need.
- A bande-dessinée (graphic novel) Dédé, illustrated by Christian Quesnel.

== See also ==
- Culture of Quebec
- Quebec sovereignty movement
