= Sommets du cinéma d'animation =

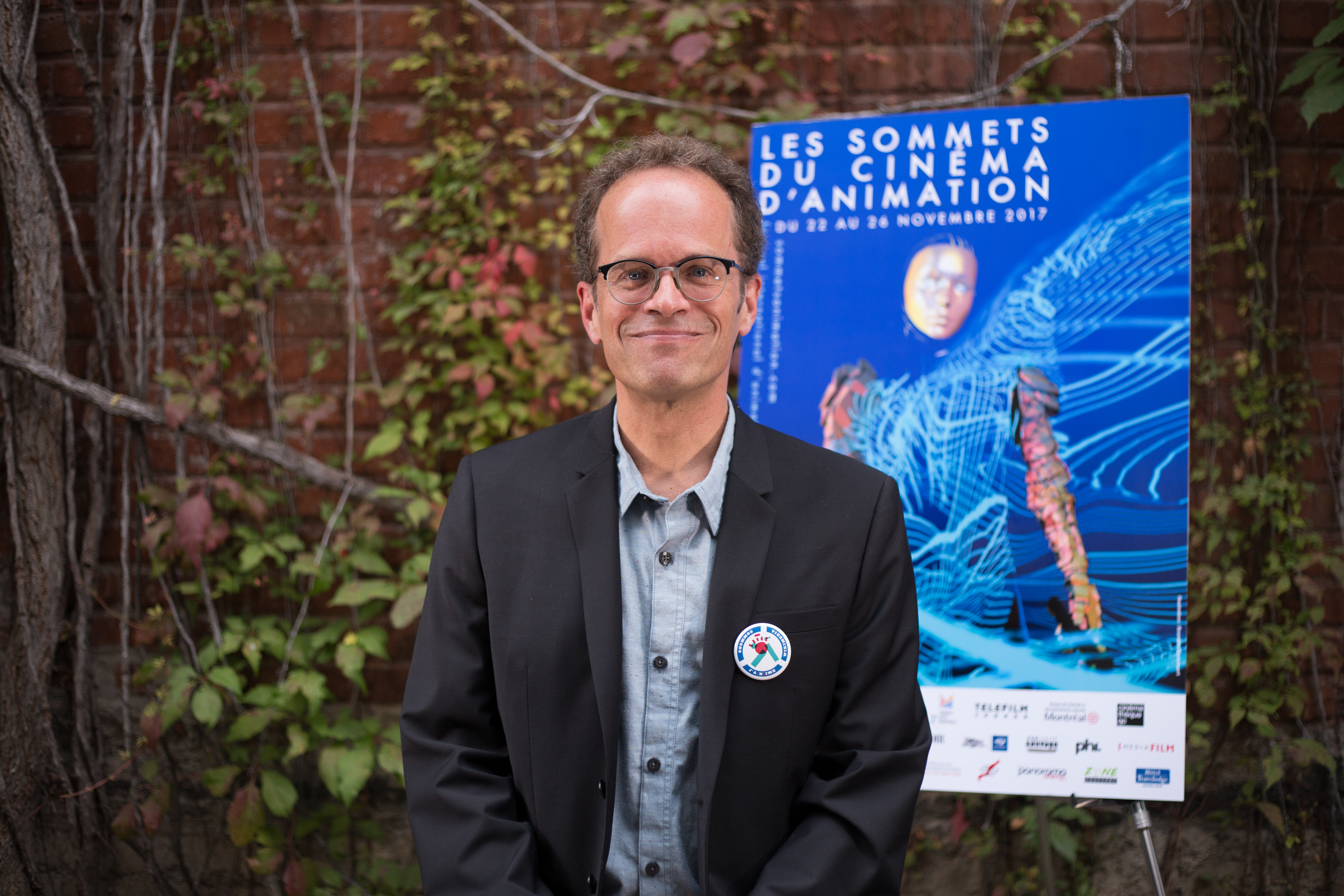
- Marco de Blois, festival's founder
- Location: Montreal, Canada
- Founded: 2002
- Awards: Grand Prix des Sommets
- Festival date: End of November
- Language: Multilangual

The Sommets du cinéma d'animation (English: Animation Film Summits) is an annual festival created in 2002 dedicated to animation cinema in all its forms, encompassing both heritage and new media. Organized by the Cinémathèque québécoise, the festival is held every year in Montreal, Quebec, Canada.

== History ==
Originally consisting of a screening of the best international animated shorts of the year, the event became a festival of non-competitive animation in 2008, seeking to encourage meetings between artists and the public. Activities are organized in parallel, such as exhibitions, workshops and conferences, retrospectives and master classes. The festival became officially competitive in 2011.

The Animation Film Summits have the distinction of taking place from 2002 to 2014 in two cities over three days: at the Cinémathèque québécoise in Montreal, as well as at the Musée de la civilisation in Quebec City, in collaboration with Antitube. Since 2015, however, they only take place in Montreal and last five days.
