= The Nose (Gogol short story) =

1836 short story by Nikolai Gogol

- Short story by Nikolai Gogol
- Original title: Нос
- Country: Russia
- Language: Russian
- Genre: Short story

Publication
- Publisher: The Contemporary
- Media type: Print (hardback & paperback) & audio book
- Publication date: 1836

"The Nose" (Russian: Нос, romanized: Nos) is a satirical short story by Nikolai Gogol.

Written between 1835 and 1836, while Gogol was living in St. Petersburg, "The Nose" tells the story of a government official whose nose leaves his face and develops a life of its own. The story was originally published in The Contemporary, a literary journal owned by Alexander Pushkin. The use of a nose as the main source of conflict could have been due to Gogol's own experience with an oddly shaped nose, which was often the subject of self-deprecating jokes in letters. The use of iconic landmarks in the story, as well as its sheer absurdity, has made "The Nose" an important part of St. Petersburg's literary tradition.

The story centers on the strange experiences of Collegiate Assessor ("Major") Kovalyov, who wakes up one morning without his nose. He later finds out that the nose has assumed a life of its own and even surpassed him in rank by attaining the title of State Councillor. The short story satirizes the scramble for official titles that plagued Russia after Peter the Great introduced the Table of Ranks. By allowing commoners to gain hereditary nobility through service to the state, a formerly immobile population was given the chance to break into the upper classes. This reform, however, also spawned the large bureaucratic complex inhabited by many of Gogol's characters.

== Plot ==
A barber in St. Petersburg, Ivan Jakovlevitch, finds a nose baked inside his breakfast loaf. He recognizes it as belonging to Major Kovaloff, a municipal committee member and regular client. Terrified of being accused of a crime, he tries and fails to dispose of it secretly, finally throwing it into the Neva River, only to be immediately confronted by a police inspector.

That same morning, Major Kovaloff wakes to discover his nose has vanished, leaving only a smooth, flat vacancy in his face. Horrified and ashamed, he covers the spot with a handkerchief and rushes out seeking help. On the street, he witnesses his own nose emerge from a carriage dressed in the gold-embroidered uniform of a state-councillor, complete with plumed hat and sword, behaving as a high-ranking official making social calls. Kovaloff confronts the nose, which haughtily denies any connection to him and departs. Kovaloff attempts to report the loss to the police and to place an advertisement, but both the newspaper official and the police commissary dismiss his story as absurd or improper.

Desperate, Kovaloff suspects a mother, Madame Podtotchina, has cursed him through witchcraft because he refuses to commit to marrying her daughter. He writes an accusatory letter, but her confused reply convinces him of her innocence. Rumors of the walking nose sweep St. Petersburg, drawing crowds and speculators until the story becomes a public sensation.

A police commissary later returns the nose to Kovaloff, explaining it was intercepted while attempting to flee to Riga using false papers and that the barber is under arrest. Yet Kovaloff's joy turns to horror when he cannot reattach the nose; it refuses to stick to his face. A doctor examines him and declares replacement impossible, advising him to preserve the nose in spirits instead. Kovaloff sinks into despair.

One morning, Kovaloff wakes to find the nose mysteriously back in its proper place as if nothing happened. Overjoyed, he resumes his former life, gets shaved by the now-timid Ivan Jakovlevitch, and struts about the city, taking snuff and flirting with ladies. The barber, released from suspicion, shaves the Major with extreme caution. Kovaloff spurns marriage to Madame Podtotchina's daughter and continues his social pursuits, his nose firmly in place.

== Themes ==
=== Olfactory perception ===
Some critics analyze the story literally instead of searching for symbolic significance. A literal interpretation suggests that Gogol's story is about the importance of olfactory perception, which is obscured in Western society by a focus on vision and appearance. This interpretation is consistent with Gogol's belief that the nose is the most important part of a person's anatomy. Major Kovalyov obsesses over his appearance, cleanliness, and rank, behavior that reflects the influence of a vision-oriented Western culture that emphasizes deodorization and hygiene. At the same time, he is deeply upset when he loses his nose, which shows that olfactory sensation is still important despite Western influence.

=== Society and class ===
Society and class played a very important role in determining one's life during the time of Gogol. With the introduction of the Table of Ranks by Peter the Great, a wholly new portion of the population was able to move up socially if it worked hard enough. In a society that was obsessed with status, people had to always look their best and prioritize their outside appearance. When Major Kovalyov sees his own nose dressed in the uniform of a higher-ranking official than himself, he is momentarily embarrassed and unable to approach the nose. Even within the context of a ridiculous scenario, feelings of inferiority and jealousy still manage to creep into Major Kovalyov's mind.

According to Igor Pilshchikov, the nose disguising itself as an official is a "grotesque hyperbole of Kovalyov's petty imposture." Kovalyov, despite being a civilian official, prefers to be called by the military rank of major. The rank of collegiate assessor occupied the same grade as major in the Table of Ranks, but military ranks were considered higher than civilian ones, and it was prohibited for a civilian official to be addressed by a military title. Near the end of the story, Kovalyov is described as having bought the ribbon for some chivalric order, although he is not a member of any such order.

=== Identity ===
The theme of identity is highlighted by how the nose is both easy and hard to identify at various points in the story. This back and forth between the identity of the nose emphasizes how Gogol's Petersburg valued outward appearance much more than one's true identity. Major Kovalyov is a minor official who acts like he is much higher ranking than he actually is. He refers to women as prostitutes and asks them to come to his apartment. His main objectives in life are to climb the table of ranks and marry well, but without his nose, he can do neither.

=== The supernatural ===
The supernatural also comes into play in this story. The nose is able to transform its size depending on what is needed to further the plot. Sometimes it is portrayed as the size of a common nose, while other times it is portrayed as the same size as a human. This strange ability plays into the absurdity of the story and adds to its comedic tone.

Gogol foresaw that his readers would misunderstand the short story as an "absurd fantasy" (Russian: "nelepye vydumki"), and mocks this reading; in particular, he mocks the widespread reading that assumes the content of the story to be meaningless.

== Style ==
It was Ivan Yermakov who first noted that the story's title in Russian (Нос, Nos) is the reverse of the Russian word for "dream" (сон, son). (Note: Yermakov writes that Gogol originally titled the work "The Dream", but later changed it to "The Nose". According to Igor Pilshchikov, "this tempting hypothesis is not supported by documentation" but has been repeated in multiple other works.) As the unreliable narrator himself notes, the story "contains much that is highly implausible", while an earlier version of the story ended with Kovalyov waking and realizing that the story was indeed a dream. Without the awakening, however, the story becomes a precursor of magical realism, as an unreal element is woven into a realistic narration. Critics also note the abrupt changes in the narrative that appear to them to be pieced together like fragments. The storyline appears to have multiple branches to facilitate the nature of unpredictability as a theme.

Major Kovalyov is a person with many inconsistencies and contradictions. Gogol uses this to highlight the "fractured identity of the main character". There is a significant imbalance in how Kovalyov views himself and how the outside world perceives him. Rather than focusing on his inner appearance, all of his energy and thought goes towards maintaining his outward appearance. "The collegiate assessor’s private and public faces seem almost unrelated." This kind of portrayal of an average citizen of Saint Petersburg reflects Gogol's position as a transplant to the city, who views the social hierarchy of the city from an outside perspective.

At the end of the story, it appears that Gogol is talking directly to the reader. It is never explained why the nose fell off in the first place, why it could talk, nor why it found itself reattached. By doing this, Gogol plays on the assumptions of readers, who may happily seek absurd stories but at the same time still want an explanation.

== Symbolism ==
In Russia, the nose has been host to a variety of proverbs that range from "torn off" (if it is too curious) to "lifted up" (if you have a high opinion of yourself) to "hung up" (with obvious defeat and failure). By the 19th century, there was extensive literature in Russian prose dedicated to nose references. Critic V.V. Vinogradov believes the nose is not only a symbol of human personality but also a source of comedy and pathos in literature.

Some critics have equated the garbled language between Kovalyov's nose and the other characters in the story to mythological consciousness. Due to the situation the characters find themselves in, human qualities are transferred to natural objects and a mythological sense of perception pervades the characters' thoughts as opposed to the former modern man sense of perception noted for its self-interest consciousness. The story juxtaposes the nose as a symbol of salvation for Major Kovalyov with the nose as a symbol of self-destruction for barber Ivan Yakovlevitch.

Major Kovalyov's nose serves as a symbol of his own snobbery and pretentious attitude. Once he loses it, his entire demeanor towards the world changes. His nose acts as the source of his own pride and is what allows him to look down on everyone else. Since his identity is primarily defined by his outward appearance, the loss of his nose represents a loss of his identity, devastating him.

== Inspiration and reception ==
The nose has been seen as a literary theme by Russian authors at least ever since the 1807 translation of Laurence Sterne's Tristram Shandy, in which the subject of noses is elaborately dealt with, especially in "Slawkenbergius's Tale". Noses, and even heads, that run about on their own, disappear and then return, or are baked in bread (as in Part I of Gogol's story) are to be found in Russian literature of the 1820s and 1830s. Out of these works, Gogol's story—part farce, part commentary—is the most famous.

In A History of Russian Literature, the critic D. S. Mirsky writes: "The Nose is a piece of sheer play, almost sheer nonsense. In it more than anywhere else Gogol displays his extraordinary magic power of making great comic art out of nothing."

Since its publication, "The Nose" has intrigued critics with its absurd story and social commentary. The absurdity creates a certain distance between the author and the reader, which provides an opportunity for readers to enjoy the story's comedic aspects, but closer analysis allows readers to see that it is a critique of their everyday lives.

== Saint Petersburg landmarks ==
As a Petersburg tale, "The Nose" has many references to the city of Saint Petersburg, where the action of the story takes place.

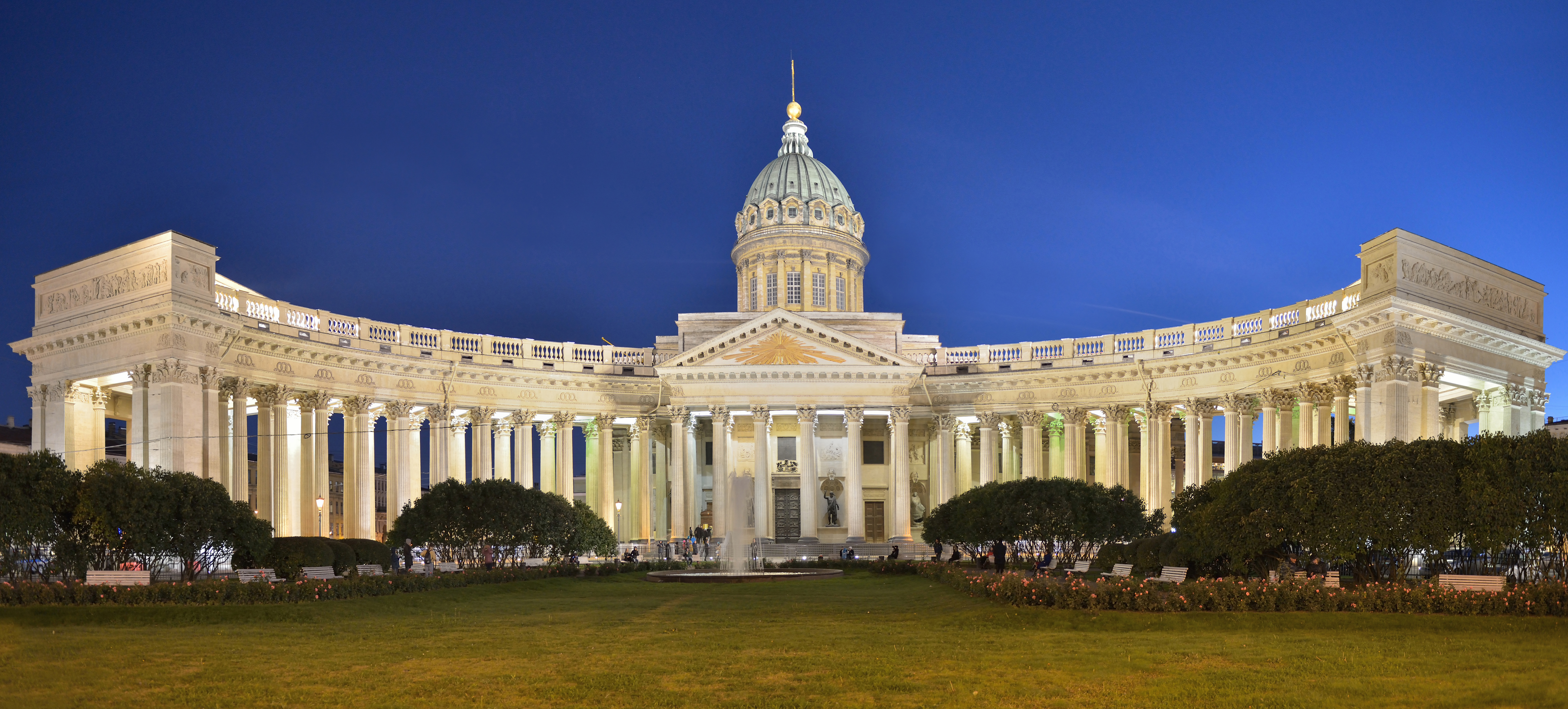
Kazan Cathedral, where the nose prays

- Voznesensky Avenue: Ivan, the barber, lives on this street.
- Isaakievsky Bridge: Ivan throws the nose into the river Neva from this bridge.
- Sadovaya Street: Major Kovalyov lives on this street.
- Nevsky Prospect: Major Kovalyov takes daily walks down this street.
- Tavrichevsky Gardens: A rumor arises that the nose took to walking in these gardens.
- Gostiny Dvor: Major Kovalyov stops here, happily, after his nose returns to his face.

== Adaptations ==
- Dmitri Shostakovich's opera The Nose, first performed in 1930, is based on this story.
- A short film based on the story, using pinscreen animation, was made by Alexandre Alexeieff and Claire Parker in 1963.
- Another animated short film, made in 1966, directed by Mordicai Gerstein, and narrated by Brother Theodore, shifts the story to Pittsburgh and changes the names (the barber is named Theodore Schneider and the nose-loser is named Nathan Nasspigel).
- Andrei Amalrik's 1968 play "Nose! Nose? No-se!", like Gogol's short story, features a Major Kovalyov who wanders around St. Petersburg in search of his nose. The Kovalyov in Amalrik's play lives in a Marxist totalitarian society and is excessively concerned about his middle-class status.
- Rolan Bykov directed a TV film adapted from the story in 1977.
- Grammy Award-winning musical brothers Jason and Christophe Beck wrote and composed a musical titled The Nose of Polton Worth in 1990 based on this story, performed in Montreal and New Haven.
- A play for radio based on the story was written by UK author Avanti Kumar and first produced and broadcast in Ireland by RTÉ in 1995.
- In April 2002, the BBC Radio 4 comedy series Three Ivans, Two Aunts and an Overcoat broadcast an adaptation of the story starring Stephen Moore.
- An album in Romanian based on the story was released by Ada Milea and Bogdan Burlăcianu in 2007.
- A play based on the short story was written by Tom Swift and produced by the Performance Corporation in 2008.
- The Fat Git Theatre Company performed their adaptation of the short story in 2011.
- WMSE (91.7 FM in Milwaukee, WI) broadcast an adaptation by Wisconsin Hybrid Theater (Radio WHT) in 2011.
- The Moscow Museum of Erotic Art put on an adaptation based on Vladimir Putin losing his genitalia to coincide with the 2012 presidential election.
- In January 2020, Andrei Khrzhanovsky released the official adaptation of the short story as a stop-motion animated film, The Nose or the Conspiracy of Mavericks.
