= Cambridge Animation Festival =

British animation festival, 1965–1998

- Alan Kitching's poster for the 1965 pilot festival
- Location: Cambridge (1965–1985); Bristol (1987–1989); Cardiff (1992–1998)
- Founded: 1965 (pilot); 1967 (first festival under this name)
- Founded by: Dick Arnall
- Most recent: 1998
- Directors: Dick Arnall (1965–1969); Antoinette Moses (1979–1983); Irene Kotlarz (1985–1992); Jayne Pilling (1994); Fran Barlow (1996); Jane Williams (1998)
- Language: English

The Cambridge Animation Festival was a British festival of animated film, held in Cambridge from 1967 and later in Bristol and Cardiff until 1998. It grew out of a pilot festival organised in 1965 by Dick Arnall, then a Cambridge undergraduate. Sight and Sound announced the 1967 festival as "for the first time, a festival of international animation in England", the International Film Guide called it "the first domestic event to concentrate entirely on animation", and Gareth Evans's obituary of Arnall in The Guardian described it as Britain's first animation festival. An International Animated Film Festival organised by John Halas had been held once, at the National Film Theatre in London, in 1957. The festival was largely non-competitive and was organised around retrospectives and themed programmes.

After editions in 1967 and 1968, the 1969 festival was cancelled. It was revived in 1979, moved to Bristol in 1987 and to Cardiff in 1992, and closed after its 1998 edition.

Channel 4 sponsored the festival from 1981, and the festival figures in accounts of how Channel 4 came to commission British animation.

== History ==
=== Founding, 1965–1968 ===
In November 1965 the Cambridge University Film Society and the Cambridge Animation Group presented a British Animation Festival at Queens' College and the Lady Mitchell Hall, with a poster by Alan Kitching. The Times later described this as "a little pilot festival" organised by Arnall "while still an undergraduate".

The 1967 festival, the first under the name Cambridge Animation Festival, ran from 16 to 19 November. It was sponsored and organised by the City of Cambridge, which gave £2,500, and presented in association with the British Film Institute. A notice in Sight and Sound gave its aim as "to increase recognition of the animated film as a medium of communication and creative entertainment", and said Cambridge hoped to do "for international animation in this country what the London Film Festival has done for international features". Arnall later said that he had "very deliberately" called it an animation festival: "I wanted to signpost a defiance of Disney's cultural hegemony and challenge the prevailing popular presumption of funny, gag-rich cartoons for kids."

The 1967 programme included new British films, a retrospective of Zagreb animation, an afternoon in which Alexandre Alexeieff and Claire Parker screened and discussed their work, and Walerian Borowczyk's feature Mr. and Mrs. Kabal's Theatre. Ian Wright, in a Sight and Sound piece asking whether Britain needed a competitive film festival, called the festival a "surprising success" and wrote that "Cambridge just might become the animators' Mecca", but warned against running a further festival on a small budget.

The second festival, in November 1968, showed about 115 short films and three features, including a retrospective of forty years of French animation. Edgar Anstey introduced a session on animation in industry, and Len Lye gave a talk and film show. Every programme opened with Cambridge Steam Engine, made for the festival by Charlie Jenkins and Heinz Edelmann. Patrick Eason, reviewing it in the Cambridge Review, wrote that "for anyone still convinced that animation is synonomous [sic] with the saccharine anthropomorphism of Disney", the festival "must have come as something of a shock", and argued that Britain kept up a "ludicrous dichotomy between popular and art films". In Sight and Sound he welcomed the absence of an award system and hoped it would "dispel the notion that animation, if not for children, is far too specialised for a general audience".

=== Cancellation, 1969 ===
The 1969 festival, planned for 26 October to 1 November as the World Festival of Animation Cinema, was to replace Annecy that year "by agreement with ASIFA" and to include a retrospective of thirty years of Czech animation. Arnall resigned in August 1969; he later said that the council could not accept the larger budget or the outside sponsorship he had raised. The council cancelled the festival "at the eleventh hour"; ASIFA's congress, planned to coincide with it, moved to London. John Halas, writing for ASIFA, described the London meeting as held "to succeed the established Cambridge event directed by Richard Arnall". The Edinburgh International Film Festival staged a "Homage to Cambridge Animation Festival" in 1970.

=== Revival in Cambridge, 1979–1985 ===
The festival was revived in 1979 by Antoinette Moses, who directed the 1979, 1981 and 1983 editions. The 1979 festival, held at the Arts Cinema from 9 to 14 November, showed about 200 films. John Canemaker, an invited guest, wrote that it presented "for the first time anywhere, a comprehensive retrospect of British animation", arranged by decade, alongside retrospectives of Lotte Reiniger, Peter Foldes and George Dunning. Its catalogue carried essays on the history of British animation, decade by decade. Halas presented a trophy to the student film judged best by a panel of critics. The BBC2 series Animation at Cambridge was made from films shown at the festival.

The 1981 festival took jazz and computer animation as its themes. At Bob Godfrey's urging, Jeremy Isaacs and Paul Bonner of the not-yet-launched Channel 4 attended and placed an advertisement in the catalogue; Moses negotiated £20,000 of sponsorship from the channel, which Clare Kitson records as double the festival's original budget. At a reception during the festival Isaacs met Peter Lord and David Sproxton of Aardman Animations. Channel 4 sponsored the 1983 festival, whose theme was "Animation and Persuasion"; nearly 250 films were shown, and the festival organised a Robert Breer exhibition with the Arts Council of Great Britain. Irene Kotlarz directed the 1985 festival, themed "Telling Tales", with Chuck Jones as a guest.

=== Bristol and Cardiff, 1987–1998 ===
In 1987 the festival moved to the Watershed and Arnolfini in Bristol as the Bristol Animation Festival. Reviewing it in Sight and Sound, James Leahy described retrospectives of the Brothers Quay, Len Lye and the Leeds Animation Workshop, and the first Norman McLaren Memorial Lecture, given by Robert Breer, and called the festival "a meeting-place for the first generation of animators who really know the history of their medium". Nick Park recalled that A Grand Day Out and the Lip Synch films, including Creature Comforts, had their first public showing at the 1989 festival. Channel 4's animation season that October took its title and inspiration from the festival, which the channel still sponsored.

In 1992 the festival moved to Cardiff, where the city offered larger premises. Its 1992 theme was "Rocking the Boat"; Theresa FitzGerald wrote in Sight and Sound that "subversion, anarchy, black humour and plain bad taste were the guiding lights", and reported the premiere of Jan Švankmajer's Food and Chuck Jones receiving the first BBC David Platt Memorial Award. Jayne Pilling directed the 1994 festival; Leslie Felperin Sharman reported that it opened with the British premiere of The Nightmare Before Christmas. Reviewing the 1996 edition, directed by Fran Barlow, Bob Swain called the festival "an essential meeting point for all those involved in the international animation industry". The 1998 edition, renamed Vital! and directed by Jane Williams, was the last; the organisation closed later that year with debts.

== Programming ==
The festival had no competition with juried prizes, apart from occasional awards such as the 1979 student trophy and the honours given at Cardiff in 1992. Its programmes were built around themes and retrospectives. Leslie Felperin Sharman, reviewing the 1994 festival in Screen, wrote that it remained "unblemished by the chauvinistic subtexts that can mar competitive film festivals elsewhere". In a history of British avant-garde film, Michael O'Pray noted that the animation festivals directed by Irene Kotlarz regularly included the work of Fischinger, Lye, Breer, Švankmajer, Norstein and the Brothers Quay, alongside the writing and curating of Jayne Pilling at the BFI and the work of Keith Griffiths's production company Koninck.

== Legacy ==
Jeremy Isaacs, Channel 4's first chief executive, wrote that the channel took an interest in animated film "spurred on by Paul Madden in Charlotte Street and by Antoinette Moses, who prevailed on us to help fund the Cambridge, and then the Bristol, Festivals of Animation". Clare Kitson, a member of the 1979–1981 festival committee who later commissioned animation for Channel 4, described the revived festival as "an ideal forum for viewings, exhibitions and discussion events".

Writing in 2000, Andrew Osmond said that "there hasn't been any British event on a comparable scale since Vital crashed and burned", and that the Cardiff festival had seemed "committed to big studio recruitment, an attitude that backfired when the majors didn't turn up". He described Animated Exeter and Animated Encounters in Bristol, both first held in 2000, as part of a revival of British animation festivals.

== Archives ==
Papers relating to the festival are held in the Dick Arnall Animation Archive at the University for the Creative Arts.
