= Mindscape =

Mindscape may refer to:

- Mental world, an ontological category in metaphysics, populated by nonmaterial mental objects, without physical extension
- Mindscape (company), a video game developer
- Mindscape (1976 film), a pinscreen animation short film by Jacques Drouin
- Mindscape (2013 film), an American psychological thriller film by Jorge Dorado
- Mindscape, a podcast by Sean M. Carroll
