= Jacques Drouin =

Canadian animator and director (1943–2021)

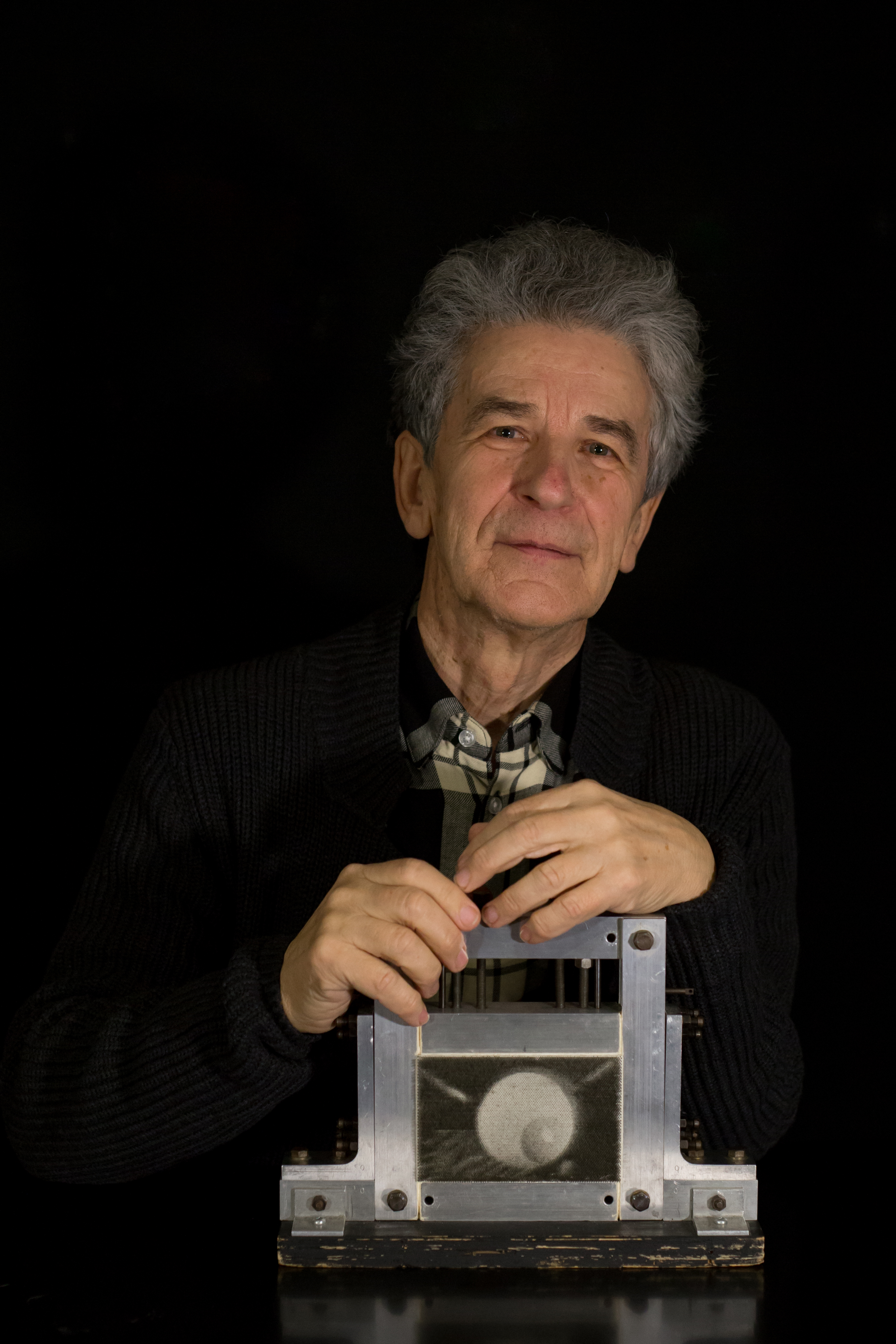
- Drouin at the Cinémathèque québécoise in 2017
- Born: 28 May 1943; Mont-Joli, Quebec, Canada
- Died: 28 August 2021 (aged 78)
- Occupations: director animator

Jacques Drouin (French: [ʒak dʁwɛ̃]; 28 May 1943 – 28 August 2021) was a Canadian animator and director most known for his pinscreen animation.

== Biography ==
Jacques Drouin was born in Mont-Joli, Quebec. He studied at the École des Beaux-Arts de Montréal for several years before leaving to study filmmaking at the UCLA in California.

He first encountered the pinscreen at an animation exhibition in 1967. By the early 1970s, he was an apprentice at the National Film Board of Canada and experimenting with this unique form of animation. His first film, Three Exercises on Alexeieff's Pinscreen, was released in 1974.

Drouin continued making pinscreen animation films for the National Film Board of Canada, one of the only animators in the world to still use this difficult but rewarding process. Some of his short films are available on NFB DVD collections, and a few are available online. His film, A Hunting Lesson, was included in the Animation Show of Shows.

Late in his career he trained animator Michèle Lemieux in the pinscreen technique and passed his pinscreen on to her, with which she made the 2012 film Here and the Great Elsewhere (Le Grand ailleurs et le petit ici).

== Filmography ==
- 1974 - Three Exercises on Alexeieff's Pinscreen (Trois exercices sur l'écran d'épingles d'Alexeieff)
- 1976 - Mindscape (Le paysagiste)
- 1986 - Nightangel (fr: L'Heure des anges, cz: Romance z temnot) - a collaboration with Bretislav Pojar.
- 1988 - A Sun Between Two Clouds (Un soleil entre deux nuages) - participated as an animator.
- 1990 - Nathaël and the Seal Hunt (Nathaël et la chasse aux phoques)
- 1991 - The Four Horsemen of the Apocalypse (Les Quatre cavaliers de l'apocalypse) - participated as an animator
- 1993 - MTV Push Pins
- 1994 - Ex-Child (Ex-enfant)
- 1996 - My Life Is a River (Une vie comme rivière) - participated as an animator.
- 2001 - A Hunting Lesson (Une leçon de chasse) - adaptation of tale by Jacques Godbout.
- 2003 - Winter Days (冬の日) - collaboration with many other famous animators
- 2004 - Imprints (Empreintes)

== Awards ==
- 1976 - Ottawa International Animation Festival Special Jury Prize for Mindscape

== See also ==
- Alexandre Alexeieff and Claire Parker
- Pinscreen animation
