= Vladimir Nepevny =

Russian filmmaker and screenwriter (born 1965)

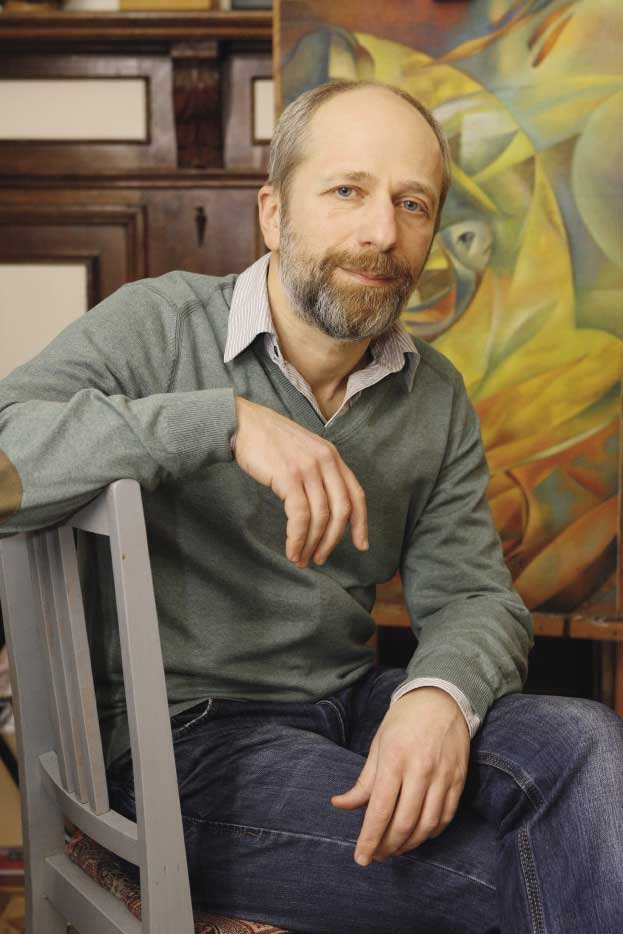
- Born: 16 August 1965 (age 60); Odessa, USSR
- Citizenship: Russia - Israel
- Occupation: film director
- Spouse: Natasha Manelis

Vladimir Nepevny (or Nepevnyi, Nepevnji Russian: Владимир Григорьевич Непе́вный; born 16 August 1965) is a filmmaker and screenwriter.

== Biography ==
Documentary filmmaker Vladimir Nepevny (or Nepevnyi, Nepevnji, etc. Russian - Владимир Непевный) was born in Odessa 16.08.1965. Graduated from the University of Odessa in Mechanical Engineering and Mathematics in 1989, and from the St. Petersburg Theatre Academy in 1997.

For many years lived in St.Petersburg, Russia. Since 2022 lives in Israel.

The author of more than 30 documentary movies about famous writers, painters, musicians, etc. nominated at many international festivals.

== Selected filmography ==
2002

- "Dreams about Alfeoni" (film about legendary artist and animator Alexandre Alexeieff). FIFA (Festival international du film sur l'art, Montreal), "Message to man" (Saint-Petersburg), Cineme (Chicago International Animation Festival), nomination «Emmy», nomination "Lavr".
- "All the Vertovs" (about legendary documentary filmmaker Dziga Vertov and his brothers - Mikhail Kaufman and Boris Kaufman. Locarno International Film Festival, Trieste film festival, Pardenone silent film festival, nomination "Lavr"

2003

- "Vasilyev brothers" (about soviet film directors Georgi and Sergei Vasilyev)
- "KIRA" (about legendary director Kira Muratova). "Message to man" (Saint-Petersburg) special prize of jury, Arsenal (Riga), goEast (Wiesbaden), Kinotavr (Sochi)

2004

- "Kuryokhin" (about free jazz pianist, composer Sergey Kuryokhin). "Message to man" (Saint-Petersburg), "Kinotavr" (Sochi)
- "Happy plumber". DOC Leipzig, INPUT-2005 (San-Francisco), Kinoshok (Anapa)

2006

- "Aleksandr Volodin. Gloomy maraphon". Golden buben (Hanti-Mansiysk), prize for the best screenplay
- Ilya+Marusya. Letters about the love (about Ilya Ilf and Marusya Tarasenko). FIFA (Festival international du film sur l'art, Montreal), Docu.arts (Berlin), Point of view (Pamplona)

2007

- "Zoshchenko. Marriage" (about Soviet author and satirist Mikhail Zoshchenko). FIFA (Festival international du film sur l'art, Montreal)
- "Alone". Guangzhou International Documentary Film Festival

2009

- "Victor Shklovsky and Roman Jacobson. Life as a Novel". "Message to man" (Saint-Petersburg), prize for the best screenplay

2010

- "Anna Akhmatova and Arthur Lourie. Words and music" (about Russian poet Anna Akhmatova and composer Arthur Lourié)

2011

- “Sosnora. Stranger” (about Russian poet Victor Sosnora). National documentary festival "Russia" (Yekaterinburg), prize of critics and journalists, prize of Russian filmarchive, "Siberia" (Omsk), People's Choice Award, "Literature and Cinema" (Gatchina), special prize "For originality of cinematic language"

2016

- "Who needs it" (short fiction). The film is based on the play by Ludmila Petrushevskaya, famous russian writer. Tarkovsky-fest (Ivanovo), Ural film fest (Yekaterinburg), Short de point (Bucharest), Kinoshok film fest (Anapa)
- "Dreyden-suite" Kinoproba (Yekaterinburg)

2017

- "GESLO. The “disappeared” expedition" "Man and sea" (Vladivostok), Grand prize in nomination "Sea history of Russia", "Russia" National documentary festival (Yekaterinburg), "Arctic open" (Archangelsk), special prize "for an honest view of history"

2018

- "Gayvoronsky: Passing Moments". Message to man (Saint-Petersburg). Pärnu International Documentary and Science Film Festival.
- "Family ties" (short). Tallinn Black Nights film festival Concorto Film Festival, Italy.

2019

- "Koulakov’s supreme ultimate". Moscow International Film Festival, Russia, Asolo Art Film Festival, Italy; "Epos", Israel; On Art, Poland.

2021

- "ONLINE DRINKING BUDDY". Moscow International Film Festival, Russia

2023

- "When we return". Haifa 39th International Film Festival special screening, Israel., FilmFestival Cottbus, Germany.

== Links ==
- Personal site
