= Alexandre Alexeieff =

Russian-born artist, filmmaker and illustrator (1901–1982)

Alexandre A. Alexeieff
- Born: 18 April 1901; Kazan, Russian Empire
- Died: 9 August 1982 (aged 81); Paris, France
- Known for: Animation, invention of pinscreen, illustration
- Spouses: Alexandra Grinevsky Countess de Lowendhal (m. 1923–1940) Claire Parker (m. 1940–1981)

Alexandre Alexandrovitch Alexeieff (Russian: Александр Александрович Алексеев; 18 April 1901 – 9 August 1982) was a Russian-born artist, filmmaker and illustrator who lived and worked mainly in Paris. He and his second wife Claire Parker (1906–1981) are credited with inventing the pinscreen as well as the animation technique totalization. In all, Alexeieff produced 6 films on the pinscreen, 41 advertising films and illustrated 41 books.

== Early life ==
Alexandre Alexeieff was born in the town of Kazan in Russia. He spent his early childhood in Istanbul where his father, Alexei Alexeieff, was a military attaché.

Alexandre had two older brothers, Vladimir and Nikolai. Vladimir committed suicide after contracting syphilis, but before he died, he wrote a note to Alexandre saying, "You are very talented. You must keep on drawing". His second brother, Nikolai, disappeared in Georgia, then part of Russia, during the Russian Revolution of 1917. Alexieff's father died mysteriously in Baden-Baden, Germany on an official trip at the age of 37.

After the death of his father, Alexieff and his family went to live with his mother's brother-in-law near Odessa, then to Riga, and finally settled in the town of Gatchina, Russia near Saint Petersburg. Later, they would move to the nearby town of Lesnoi.

While in Riga, Alexeieff saw a film for the very first time which made an impression on him. He was surprised to find that the image which was projected on the screen could be seen reflected in the lens of the projector, which happened to be close to where he was sitting. He later realized that the image on the lens was the original one.

== Cadet Corps School ==
Alexeieff entered the Naval Cadet Corps in Saint Petersburg at the age of seven. There he learned how to draw from memory, a skill he would apply later on in life when he became an illustrator.

While in the Cadet School, Alexeieff founded a literary magazine which contained works created by students. His friends did not take this project seriously. However, Alexeieff was able to petition for funds and also obtain access to the library which was very valuable to him.

When the Russian Revolution of 1917 began with general strikes in St. Petersburg, the school was closed for three days and Alexeieff returned home to Lesnoi by train. However, his brothers Nikolai and Vladimir had not returned and his mother was in a state of panic. Eventually, his brothers did return having been caught as bystanders in a fight between the police and revolutionaries. Shortly thereafter, he received word that Nicholas II of Russia had been arrested and abdicated.

In 1921 Alexeieff was forced to leave the city of Ufa where he had spent the summer with his maternal uncle in order to cross Siberia with a group of cadets. They landed in Vladivostok, where they took they then boarded a ship for Egypt. The ship was then purchased by the British who kept the crew in order to transport coal from Southampton to Cairo. During one of the crossings, a storm forced them to anchor in the French Riviera where Alexeieff jumped ship holding on to a letter of recommendation to the Russian set designer Sergei Soudeikin who was living in Paris. Alexeieff started by working designing and painting sets for the Pioteff Theater. He lived in Montparnasse, a bohemian area of Paris.

== Life in Paris ==
In 1923, he married Alexandra Alexandrovna Grinevskya (1899–1976), an actress at the Pitoeff theatre who had been sent to Paris in her childhood because she was the illegitimate daughter of a St. Petersburg dignitary. Their daughter, Svetlana, was born in 1923.

Alexeieff became well known in this period shortly after illustrating his first rare books. However, he lost one of his lungs while using nitric acid to do his aquatints and was forced to spend two years in a sanatorium. During that time, his wife took his tools and taught herself how to engrave in order to financially support the family. While the invention of the pinscreen is often credited to Claire Parker and Alexeieff, Alexandra Grinevskya was the first to help Alexeieff build the pinscreen, with the help of her eight-year-old daughter.

== Parker and Alexeieff ==
Claire Parker (1906–1981), a well-to-do American art student and graduate of MIT came to France in 1931 to study art. She saw Alexieff's work in a bookshop window and got the name of the artist as well as his address from the owner of the bookstore. She was so impressed she arranged to meet him and came to Vaux-le Penail where the Alexeieffs lived. She recalled later, "I figured I would meet an old, dignified man with a white beard... but [instead] I saw this tall, brown, handsome, aristocratic 30-year-old guy. Our first lesson ended on the banks of the Seine, hand in hand; and there was never a second one.".

Alexeieff and his wife agreed to take Claire as a boarder and as a student. After a few months, Claire became Alexeieff's lover. They moved to Paris and rented several artist studios where they collaborated on various projects. When they started to make films, Claire became the camera person and Grinevsky built and painted the props and sets for the films. However, after the first large pin screen was built, Parker and Alexeieff worked on it alone.

Alexeieff, Parker and Grinevskaya made about 25 stop motion-animated commercials to sustain themselves financially, though they reportedly did not see much difference between their "artistic" and "commercial" films. At times, when making traditional animated films and commercials they also had a fourth partner, animator Etienne Raik. Although most of the commercial and art films are credited to Alexeieff and Parker, it is difficult to separate the contributions of each of the individuals who had formed Alexeieff's team. The group included Alexandra Grinevsky, Etienne Raik, Pierre Gorodich, and Georges Violet.

After building the first large pinscreen, Alexeieff and Parker began work on the first pinscreen film in 1931, Night on Bald Mountain, an adaptation of the piece by Modest Mussorgsky, his favorite Russian composer. The theme of Mussorgsky's composition and the film is a witches' Sabbath on the summer solstice on Mount Triglav, located near Kiev. However the film is less narrative and more poetic, a succession of images rather than a story. The film took the couple two years to make.

The technique of the pinscreen made it impossible to erase any of the images that had been shot after having drawn them. Once an image was shot, it was impossible to correct it; one had to wait until the film was back from the laboratory. Therefore, two years of work had been conceived in the dark. Adding to the impermanence of the pinscreen itself, Alexeieff made no sketches for the film, composing each shot in his head and filming them immediately.

The reception at the Pantheon Theater in Paris was extremely encouraging. Newspaper articles were positive, artists and film critics felt that the team had succeeded in creating a more serious type of animation, moving away from cartoons. However, it soon became apparent that working on the pinscreen was time-consuming and therefore costly to use. Consequently, major studios never offered to use the pinscreen with the exception of the National Film Board of Canada.

In 1936, Alexeieff was hired by a German film group in Berlin to lead an animation studio. He made a few animated films for German products and returned to Paris right before the Anschluss, the German annexation of Austria. When the Germans invaded the Netherlands and Belgium in 1940, Alexeieff expected to have German film producers come and ask him make propaganda films which he would have refused to do. Therefore, he packed their old Ford automobile and the family fled south in order to pick up visas at the US Embassy in Bordeaux.

Alexeieff divorced Alexandra Grinevsky and married Claire Parker in 1940 after they arrived in the States. Alexandra and Svetlana lived separately. In 1943, they moved to Canada and produced their second pinscreen film, In Passing (En passant), with funding from the National Film Board of Canada. It was released in 1944. The four returned to France in 1946.

== Later life ==
When Parker and Alexeieff returned to Paris, they made a number of advertising films. Alexeieff invented a technique called Totalization of Illusory Solids or simply Totalization. This process involves filming a moving object at long exposures to capture the trace of the path of motion. The resulting image gives the appearance of a solid object. For example, the path of a pendulum filmed in this fashion would appear to be a solid semicircle. This technique gave their advertisements a unique look.

Alexeieff and Parker also continued to make films using the pin screen. In 1962, they used it to make the prologue to Orson Welles' film adaptation of Franz Kafka's novel The Trial. This marks the only mainstream, widely distributed film that Alexeieff and Parker were involved with. The pin-screen was not animated for this sequence. Instead still shots were filmed while Orson Welles read Kafka's parable "Before the Law" over it.

The Nose, based on Nikolai Gogol's satirical short story, was released in 1963 and marks the first narrative film made on the pinscreen. The film tells the story of a Russian official who loses his nose and the adventures of the nose itself as well as the barber who finds the nose.

On 7 August 1972, Alexeieff and Parker were invited back to Canada in order to demonstrate the pinscreen to a group of animators at the National Film Board of Canada. This demonstration was filmed, and released by the NFB as Pin Screen. This film appears on disk 7 of Norman McLaren: The Master's Edition, along with Pinscreen Tests (1961).

In the same year, they also released another film again, based on Mussorgsky's Pictures at an Exhibition. This film used two pinscreens. In front of the main pinscreen, they installed a second, smaller one. This second pinscreen could be rotated thus giving more of an illusion of three-dimensionality. However, the film was never completed.

Their last film, Three Moods (Trois thèmes), was made on the pinscreen, and first shown in Milan, Italy, in March 1980. It was based on three works by Mussorgsky.

Parker died in 1981 in Paris, and Alexeieff followed Claire by a year. The two are buried in Nice, France. He and Parker left no children.

Although Alexeieff and Parker strove to create serious works of art and shunned any commercialization in their films (excluding their paid work doing advertisements, of course), when asked what her favorite films were, Parker answered "The ones with Tom Mix and his beautiful white horse!"

== The pinscreen ==
Alexeieff is most famous for his invention of the pinscreen which he used to make about 6 short films.

The pinboard on which Alexeieff created his films is an upright perforated board, three by four feet, into which a million headless steel pins have been inserted. When the pins are pushed forward and lighted obliquely, they create an entirely black surface on the front of the Pinboard. When they are pushed back, the white of the board shows through. In between the pins create various shades of grey.

The first prototype of the pinscreen was made by Alexandra Grinevsky with the help of her daughter Svetlana. It consisted of a canvas perforated with a grid into which pins were inserted. Later, Parker and Alexeieff built the first large pinscreen which was used to film Night on Bald Mountain. The Parker family paid for the construction of it.

Alexeieff never made sketches before he created the images on the screen. He conceived each of the stages on the positive side of the screen while Claire worked on the back side of it. Small man made tools were used to produce various patterns on the board. Such everyday instruments as forks, spoons, knives, brushes, cups, prisms and rolling pins were used. Each of the frames was created one at a time, in a process that required delicate, painstaking attention to detail.

The only follower of Alexeieff, Jacques Drouin of the National Film Board of Canada, has made several films using this technique, most notably Mindscape (Le Paysagiste).

== Legacy ==
Svetlana Rockwell (née Alexeieff) is an artist who uses pastels and acrylics. She has written her memoirs which describe accurately her family's background. Her son, Alexandre Rockwell is an independent film maker in the United States. Alexandre acknowledged the influence his grandfather had on his work, writing in his contribution to Itineraire d’un Maitre that "I can safely say there has been no greater influence in my life, and in that I know I am not alone." Itineraire d’un Maitre consists of essays by Yuri Norstein, Nikolay Izvolov, Oleg Kovalov, Georges Nivat, Claudine Eizykman, Guy Fihman, Dominique Willoughby, Svetlana Alexeieff-Rockwell as well as Alexandre Rockwell.

== Filmography ==
=== Artistic films ===
Year	Film	Music	Notes
1933	Die Nacht auf dem Kahlen Berge (English translation: Night on Bald Mountain)	Night on Bald Mountain by Mussorgsky. Arr. Rimsky-Kosakov. performed by the London Symphony Orchestra	first film made on the pinscreen Alexieff and Parker are credited as producers.
1943	En passant English translation: In passing	Canadian Folk Songs	Produced by The National Film Board of Canada; Film was released together with C'est L'Aviron by Norman MacLaren as Popular Songs
1960	A Propos de Jivago English Translation: Concerning Zhivago		Documentary film.
1961	Pinscreen Tests		brief animation tests filmed in their Paris studio
1962	title sequence for The Trial (1962) directed by Orson Welles		
1963	The Nose	Improvised by Hai Minh	Based on a short story by Nikolai Gogol Won the Count de Lanua Prize at the International Art Film Festival, Knokke-Le-Zoute, Belgium 1964; Awarded Diploma of the International Short Film Festival, Berlin, 1964. Honorable Mention, Film of High Quality, French National Center for Cinematography, 1963.
1971	Segments for Mon univers illustreé My Illustrated World		Television documentary directed by Jean Mouselle
1972	Tableaux d'Exposition English Translation: Pictures at an Exhibition	Mussorgsky; Arr. Rimsky-Korsakov	Used a smaller rotating pinscreen mounted in front of the usual screen. Honorable Mention, High Artistic Quality, French National Center for Cinematography.
1980	Trois Themes English translation: Three Themes	Mussorgsky; Arr. Rimsky-Korsakova	Won Jury's Prize, Foreign Film Festival 1980

=== Advertisements ===
Year	Film	Client	Technique
1934	La Belle au bois Dormant; Sleeping Beauty	Vins Nicolas (vineyard)	dolls, drawing
1935	Les deux armies The Two Armies	Creme Simon (cosmetics)	object animation
1935	Parade des Chapeaux; Parade of Hats	Sools (Hats)	object animation
1935	La trône de France; The Throne of France	Levitan (furniture)	object animation
1936	Aroma	Franck Aroma (coffee)	object animation
1936	Tiré à quatre épingles Pulling Four Needles	Sigrand (Menswear)	object animation
1936	Davros Ronde	Davros (cigarettes)	object animation
1936	Jeu de cartes Card Game	Creme Simon (cosmetics)	object animation
1936	De l'or About Gold	Huilor (Cooking oil)	object animation
1936	Opta empfängt	Radio Löwe	object animation
1936	La naissance de Venus	Creme Simon (cosmetics)	object animation
1936	Cenra	Cenra (Wrapping Paper)	object animation
1936	Lingner Werke	Lingner (Toilet Paper)	object animation
1937	Etoiles nouvelles New Stars	Davros (cigarettes)	object animation
1937	Palette d'artiste The Artist's palette	Balatum (linoleum)	object animation
1937	Evian	Evian (mineral water)	object animation
1937	Le Rayon vert The Grean Ray		objekt animation
1938	Grands feux Great Fires	Nestor Martin (foundry)	object animation
1938	Etude sur l'harmonie des Lignes; Study on the Harmony of Lines	Gaine Roussel (lingerie)	object animation
1939	Jaffa	Jaffa Oranges	object animation
1939	Gulfstream (unfinished)	Gulfstream (water-heater)	
1943–1944	Animated Logo	US Office of War, Film Department	pinscreen
1952	Fumées; Smoked	Van der Elst (tobacco)	pinscreen
1953	Masques; Masks	Van der Elst (tobacco)	object animation, totalization
1954	Nocturne	Ultra Therma (blankets)	object animation
1954	Rimes; Rhymes	Brun (pastries)	object animation
1954	Pure beauté Pure beauty	Monsavon (soap)	object animation
1955	Le Buisson ardent The Burning Bush	Esso (petroleum products)	object animation
1955	La Sève de la terre The Sap of the Earth	Esso (petroleum products)	object animation, totalization
1956	Bain d'X; Mr. X's Bath	Bendix (Washing Machine)	object animation, totalization
1956	Osram arbe Osram tree	Osram (lighting)	object animation
1956	Osram cage	Osram (lighting)	object animation
1956	Osram oeufs Osram eggs	Osram (lighting)	object animation
1956	Osram lustre Osram lights	Osram (lighting)	totalization
1956	Quatre temps Four seasons	Blizzand	object animation, pinscreen
1957	Cocinor	Cocinor (film distributors)	totalization
1957	100%	Nescafé (instant coffee)	object animation, totalization
1958	Automation	Renault (automobiles)	object animation, location shooting
1958	Anonym; Anonymous	L'Oreal (cosmetics)	object animation
1958	Divertissement	Regie des Tabacs (cigarettes)	totalization
1958	Constance	L'Oreal (cosmetics)	totalization
1961	L'eau; Water	L'Oreal (cosmetics)	drawing, totalization

=== Documentaries about Alexeieff ===
- Alexeieff at the Pinboard (1960) – documentary filmed in their Paris studio
- Portrait of Alexeieff (1971) – documentary by Maurice Debeze.
- Pin Screen (1972) – documentary of a pinscreen demonstration at the National Film Board of Canada
- Dreams about Alfeoni (2002) - documentary by Vladimir Nepevny

== Books illustrated by Alexeieff ==
- Guillaume Apollinaire, Les Épingles, Éditions des Cahiers libres, 1928
- (Edgar A. Poe), "The fall of the house of Usher" The Halcyon Press, 1930
- Léon-Paul Fargue, Poëmes, Librairie Gallimard NRF, 1931

== Bibliography ==
- Bendazzi, Giannalberto (1995). Cartoons: One Hundred Years of Cinema Animation. Paris, France: Indiana University Press. ISBN 2-910027-75-9.
- Bendazzi, Giannalberto (2001). Alexeieff: Itinerary of a Master. Dreamland. ISBN 978-2-910027-75-9.
- Krasner, Jon S. (2004). Motion Graphic Design and Fine Art Animation. Gulf Professional Publishing. ISBN 978-0-240-80482-8.
