= Stormy Night (2003 film) =

- French: Nuit d'orage
- Directed by: Michèle Lemieux
- Written by: Michèle Lemieux
- Produced by: Marcel Jean; Jean-Jacques Leduc
- Edited by: Richard Comeau
- Music by: Normand Roger
- Animation by: Michèle Lemieux
- Production company: National Film Board of Canada
- Release date: 2003
- Running time: 9 minutes
- Country: Canada
- Language: French

Stormy Night (French: Nuit d'orage) is a Canadian animated short film, directed by Michèle Lemieux and released in 2003. Adapted from her own children's book, the film centres on a young girl who cannot sleep due to the noise from a thunderstorm, and who becomes engrossed in her imagination.

The film was a Genie Award nominee for Best Animated Short at the 24th Genie Awards in 2004.
