= The Trial (1962 film) =

1962 film by Orson Welles

- French theatrical release poster
- French: Le Procès
- Directed by: Orson Welles
- Screenplay by: Orson Welles
- Based on: The Trial; 1925 novel by Franz Kafka
- Produced by: Alexander Salkind
- Starring: Anthony Perkins; Orson Welles; Jeanne Moreau; Romy Schneider; Akim Tamiroff; Elsa Martinelli
- Cinematography: Edmond Richard
- Edited by: Fritz H. Mueller; Orson Welles (Note: Uncredited)
- Music by: Jean Ledrut; Remo Giazotto (Adagio in G minor)
- Distributed by: Astor Pictures Corporation
- Release dates: 22 December 1962 (France); 2 April 1963 (West Germany); 7 September 1963 (Italy)
- Running time: 118 minutes
- Countries: France; Italy; West Germany
- Language: English
- Budget: US$1.3 million
- Box office: 998,779 admissions (France)

The Trial (French: Le Procès) is a 1962 drama film written and directed by Orson Welles, based on the 1925 posthumously published novel of the same name by Franz Kafka. Welles stated immediately after completing the film: "The Trial is the best film I have ever made". The film begins with Welles narrating Kafka's parable "Before the Law" to pinscreen scenes created by the artists Alexandre Alexeieff and Claire Parker.

Anthony Perkins stars as Josef K., a bureaucrat who is accused of a never-specified crime, and Jeanne Moreau, Romy Schneider and Elsa Martinelli play women who become involved in various ways in Josef's trial and life. Welles plays the Advocate, Josef's lawyer and the film's principal antagonist.

The Trial has grown in reputation over the years, and some critics, including Roger Ebert, have called it a masterpiece. It is often praised for its scenic design and cinematography, the latter of which includes disorienting camera angles and unconventional use of focus.

== Plot ==
Josef K. is sleeping in his bedroom, in an apartment he shares with other lodgers. He is awakened when a man in a suit opens his bedroom door. Josef assumes the glib man is a policeman, but the intruder does not identify himself and ignores Josef's demand to produce police ID. Several detectives enter and tell Josef he is under open arrest. In another room Josef K. sees three co-workers from his place of employment; they are there to provide evidence regarding some unstated crime. The police refuse to inform Josef K. of his misdeeds, or if he is even being charged with a crime, and they do not take him into custody.

After the detectives leave, Josef converses with his landlady, Mrs. Grubach, and neighbor, Miss Bürstner, about the strange visit. Later he goes to his office, where his supervisor thinks he has been having improper relations with his teenaged female cousin. That evening, Josef attends the opera, but is abducted from the theater by a police inspector and taken to a courtroom, where he attempts in vain to confront the still-unstated case against him.

Josef returns to his office and discovers the two police officers who first visited him being whipped in a small room. Josef's uncle Max suggests that Josef consult with Hastler, a law advocate. After brief encounters with the wife of a courtroom guard and a roomful of condemned men awaiting trial, Josef is granted an interview with Hastler, which proves unsatisfactory.

Hastler's mistress suggests that Josef seek the advice of the artist Titorelli, but this also proves unhelpful. Seeking refuge in a cathedral, Josef very briefly discusses his case with a priest. Hastler abruptly appears at the cathedral to confirm the priest's assertion.

On the evening before his thirty-first birthday, Josef is apprehended by two executioners and taken to a quarry pit, where he is ordered to remove some of his clothing. The executioners pass a knife back and forth, apparently deliberating on who will do the deed, before handing the knife to the condemned man, who refuses to commit suicide. The executioners leave Josef in the quarry and toss dynamite in the pit. Josef laughs at his executioners and picks up the dynamite. From a distance one can hear an explosion and smoke billows into the air.

== Cast ==
- Anthony Perkins – Josef K.
- Jeanne Moreau – Marika Bürstner
- Romy Schneider – Leni
- Elsa Martinelli – Hilda
- Suzanne Flon – Miss Pittl
- Orson Welles – Albert Hastler, The Advocate
- Akim Tamiroff – Bloch
- Madeleine Robinson – Mrs. Grubach
- Paola Mori – Court archivist
- Arnoldo Foà – Inspector A
- Fernand Ledoux – Chief Clerk of the Law Court
- Michael Lonsdale – Priest
- Max Buchsbaum – Examining Magistrate
- Max Haufler (dubbed by Peter Sallis) – Uncle Max
- Maurice Teynac – Deputy Manager
- Wolfgang Reichmann – Courtroom Guard
- Thomas Holtzmann – Bert the law student
- Billy Kearns – First Assistant Inspector
- Jess Hahn – Second Assistant Inspector
- Naydra Shore – Irmie, Joseph K.'s cousin
- Carl Studer – Man in Leather
- Jean-Claude Rémoleux – Policeman #1
- Raoul Delfosse – Policeman #2
- William Chappell – Titorelli

== Production ==
In 1960, Welles was approached by producer Alexander Salkind to make a film from a public domain literary work. Salkind had originally wanted Welles to make a film of Nikolai Gogol's novella Taras Bulba. When Salkind found out that producer Harold Hecht was already making a version of Taras Bulba with Yul Brynner in the lead, he offered Welles a list of 82 other film titles to choose from. From that selection, Welles decided The Trial would be the most feasible film to make. (Earlier that year, Michael Lindsay-Hogg—who may have been Welles's son—had casually mentioned an idea to Welles about adapting The Trial as a stage play, prompting Welles to state that The Trial was an important book and that he, Welles, should re-read it.) Salkind promised that Welles would have total artistic freedom and he would not interfere with Welles' creation. They later discovered that the book was not yet in the public domain and that they needed to obtain the rights to the property.

Salkind committed 650 million French francs (U.S.$1.3 million in 1962 currency) to the budget for The Trial and secured backing from West German, French and Italian investors.

Welles took six months to write the screenplay. In adapting the work, he rearranged the order of Kafka's chapters. In this version, the chapter line-up read 1, 4, 2, 5, 6, 3, 8, 7, 9, 10. However, the order of Kafka's chapters was arranged by his literary executor, Max Brod, after the writer's death, and this order is not definitive. Welles also modernized several aspects of the story, introducing computer technology and changing Miss Bürstner's profession from a typist to a cabaret performer. Welles also opened the film with a fable from the book about a man who is permanently detained from seeking access to the Law by a guard. To illustrate this allegory, he used the pin screen animation of Alexandre Alexeieff and Claire Parker, who created animated prints using thousands of pins.

Welles also changed the manner of Josef K.'s death. Kafka originally had the executioners pass the knife over the head of Josef K., thus giving him the opportunity to take the weapon and kill himself, in a more dignified manner—Josef K. does not; instead he is fatally stabbed by his executioners in the heart, and as he dies Josef K. says "like a dog." In the film, whilst the executioners still offer him the knife, Josef K. refuses to take it, and goads the executioners by yelling "You'll have to do it!" The film ends with the smoke of the fatal dynamite blast forming a mushroom cloud in the air while Welles reads the closing credits on the soundtrack.

Another notable change is that of Josef's relationships with the numerous women in the film. Although Josef seems to be interested in Miss Bürstner, his later interactions with Hilda and Leni are dispassionate and awkward. In the film, Josef shows little romantic attention to Leni, and she often touches him sexually without him asking her to. Henry Jaglom, a friend of Welles's, claimed that Welles confided in him, saying that he knew Perkins was gay "and used that quality in Perkins to suggest another texture in Joseph K, a fear of exposure. The whole homosexuality thing—using Perkins that way—was incredible for that time. It was intentional on Orson's part: He had these three gorgeous women (Jeanne Moreau, Romy Schneider, Elsa Martinelli) trying to seduce this guy, who was completely repressed and incapable of responding." Jaglom went on to say, "The closetedness of Perkins' homosexuality... he thought that brought a whole wonderful subtext. I remember him saying that they never talked about it, but he felt that Perkins definitely knew what he was doing." Film critic Roger Ebert theorized that this "could be interpreted as a nightmare in which women make demands [Josef] K is uninterested in meeting." This has led some to believe that The Trial might have gay undertones.

Welles initially hoped to cast U.S. comic actor Jackie Gleason as Hastler, but he took the role himself when Gleason rejected the part. Welles also dubbed the dialogue for 11 actors in The Trial. Welles reportedly dubbed a few lines of Anthony Perkins’ dialogue and challenged Perkins to identify the dubbing. Perkins was unable to locate the lines where Welles dubbed his voice. British actor Peter Sallis was brought in to dub Max Haufler's dialogue, which had been delivered in Hungarian, into American-accented English.

Welles began the production in Yugoslavia. To create Josef K.’s workplace, he created a set in an exposition hall just outside Zagreb, where 850 secretaries banged typewriters at 850 office desks. Other sequences were later shot in Dubrovnik, Rome, Milan and Paris. Welles was not able to film The Trial in Kafka’s home city of Prague, as his work was seen as decadent by the communist government in Czechoslovakia.

In Paris, Welles planned to shoot the interiors of his film at the Boulogne Studios, but Salkind had difficulties collecting promised capital to finance the film. Instead, he used the Gare d'Orsay, an abandoned Parisian railway station. Welles rearranged his set design to accommodate this new setting, and he later defended his decision to film at Gare d'Orsay in an interview with Cahiers du cinéma, where he stated: "Everything was improvised at the last moment, because the whole physical concept of my film was quite different. It was based on the absence of sets. And the gigantic nature of the sets, which people have objected to, is partly due to the fact that the only setting I had was that old abandoned station."

Welles edited The Trial in Paris while technically on vacation; he commuted in on weekends from Málaga, Spain, where he was taking time to film sequences (reported as being "the prologue and epilogue") for his self-financed film adaptation of Don Quixote, to oversee the post-production work.

In a later interview with Peter Bogdanovich, Anthony Perkins stated that Welles gave him the direction that The Trial was meant to be seen as a black comedy. Perkins would also state his greatest professional pride came in being the star of a Welles-directed feature.

While filming in Zagreb, Welles met 21-year-old Croatian actress Olga Palinkaš. He renamed her Oja Kodar, and she became Welles' companion and occasional artistic collaborator during the latter years of his career.

== Release ==
Welles initially planned to premiere The Trial at the Venice Film Festival in September 1962, but the film was not completed in time. The festival organizers showed the Academy Award winning musical West Side Story instead.

Welles continued to edit the film up until its December 1962 premiere in Paris. In an interview with the BBC, he mentioned that on the eve of the premiere he jettisoned a ten-minute sequence (it is actually about six minutes long) where Josef K. meets with a computer scientist (played by Greek actress Katina Paxinou) who uses her technology to predict his fate. Welles explained the last-minute cut by noting: "I only saw the film as a whole once. We were still in the process of doing the mixing, and then the premiere fell on us... [The scene] should have been the best in the film and it wasn't. Something went wrong, I don't know why, but it didn't succeed."

Ultimately, the US theatrical release of The Trial came in 1963.

=== Box office ===
The film earned US $1,403,700 in North America, the UK and the British Commonwealth. It did not make a profit.

=== Critical reception ===
The Trial polarized critics upon release. Immediately after its completion, Welles said, "Say what you like, but The Trial is the best film I have ever made." The film was reacted to more positively in France, where it won the Best Film award of the French Syndicate of Cinema Critics in 1963.

Charles Higham's 1970 biography of Welles dismissed the film as "an agonizing experience [...] a dead thing, like some tablet found among the dust of forgotten men, speaking a language that has much to say to us, but whose words have largely been rubbed away."

The film has continued to polarize film critics and scholars, yet while it still has its detractors, contemporary analysis is far more positive. In his 1996 biography of Welles, David Thomson said the film was "an astonishing work, and a revelation of the man... a stunning film". On the review aggregator website Rotten Tomatoes, 84% of 45 critical reviews awarded the film a positive review, with an average rating of 7.7/10. Film critic Roger Ebert called the film "an exuberant use of camera placement and movement and inventive lighting," awarding it a full four stars.

Film critic Leonard Maltin gave The Trial a rating of 3 and a half out of 4 stars and described it as "[g]ripping, if a bit confusing" and "not for all tastes."

While film critic Pauline Kael writes that the film was somewhat of a "light-plot set" where it embodied the dissolving of and montage of light.

In the British Film Institute's 2002 Sight & Sound poll, Argentine film critic and historian Fernando Martín Peña voted for The Trial.

=== Post-release history ===
In 1981, Welles planned to create a documentary on the making of The Trial. Cinematographer Gary Graver was hired to film Welles addressing a University of Southern California audience on the film's history. The footage was shot with a 16mm camera on color reversal stock, but Welles never completed the proposed documentary. The footage is now in the possession of Germany’s Filmmuseum Munich, and has since been restored.

No copyright was ever filed on The Trial, which resulted in the film being a public domain title in the US. Although it is possible that the copyright was restored by the URAA, no "Notice of Intent to Enforce" was filed with the US Copyright Office.

In 2000, a restored version based on the long-lost original 35mm negative was released on DVD by Milestone Films. As of 2015, a 2K restoration by Rialto Pictures is playing in DCP format in various North American cities. A 4K restoration of the film was released by the Criterion Collection on September 19, 2023.

== See also ==
- Trial film
