= The Painting (2024 film) =

- French: Le Tableau
- Directed by: Michèle Lemieux
- Written by: Michèle Lemieux
- Produced by: Julie Roy; Christine Noël
- Edited by: Annie Jean
- Music by: Robert Marcel Lepage
- Animation by: Michèle Lemieux
- Production company: National Film Board of Canada
- Release date: May 2024 (Sommets du cinéma d'animation)
- Running time: 11 minutes
- Country: Canada

The Painting (French: Le Tableau) is a Canadian animated short film, directed by Michèle Lemieux and released in 2024. Made using pinscreen animation, the film illustrates the life of Mariana of Austria through a recreation of Diego Velázquez's Portrait of Mariana of Austria.

The film premiered in May 2024 at the Sommets du cinéma d'animation, and was subsequently screened at the 2024 Annecy International Animation Film Festival.

The film received a Prix Iris nomination for Best Animated Short Film at the 27th Quebec Cinema Awards in 2025.
