= Heinz Edelmann =

Czech-German illustrator and designer (1934–2009)

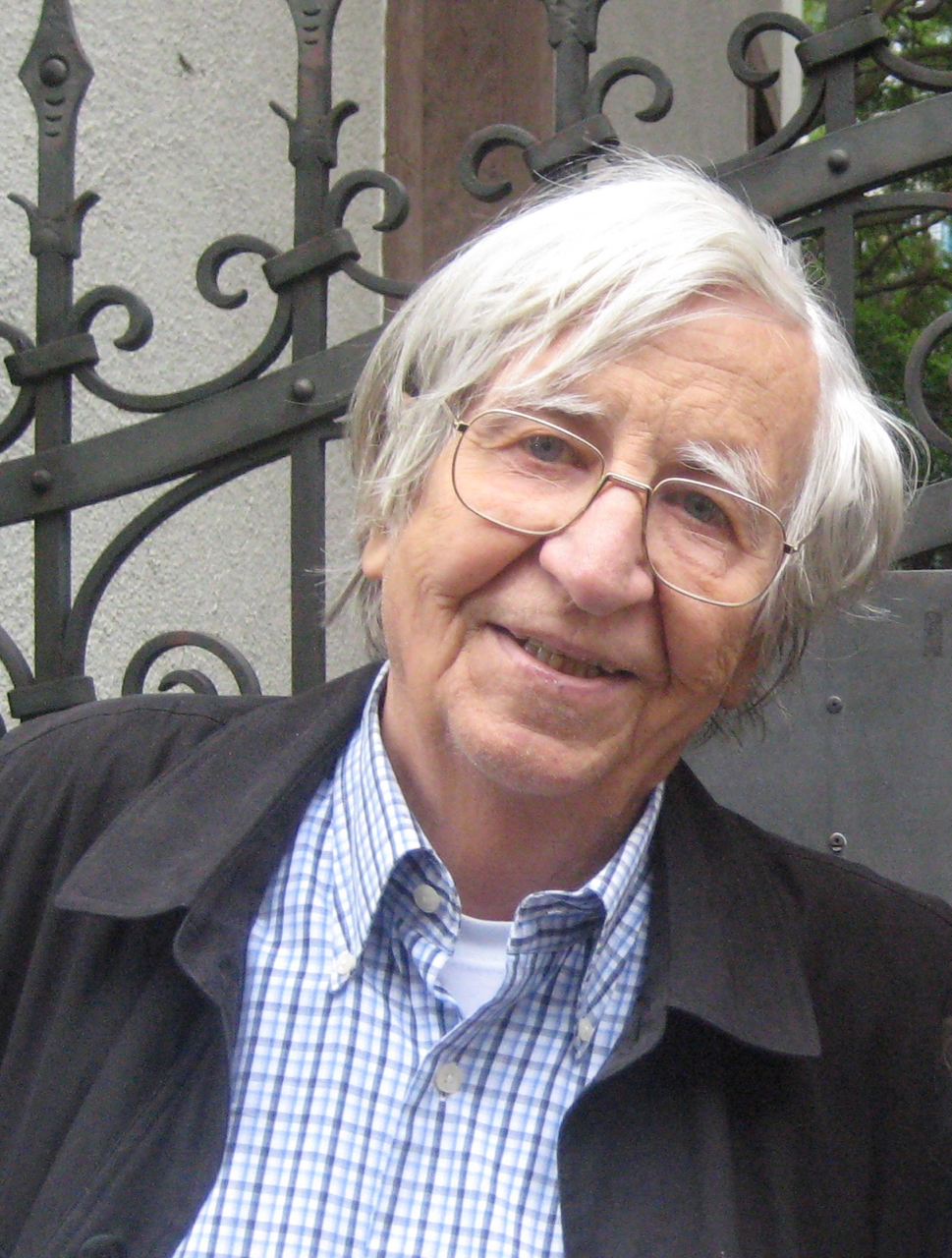
- Born: 20 June 1934; Ústí nad Labem, Czechoslovakia
- Died: 21 July 2009 (aged 75); Stuttgart, Germany
- Education: Kunstakademie Düsseldorf
- Occupations: Illustrator, and designer

Heinz Edelmann (20 June 1934 – 21 July 2009) was a Czech-German illustrator and designer. His art direction and character designs for the Beatles' 1968 animated film Yellow Submarine brought him additional recognition around the world.

== Life and career ==
Edelmann was born in Ústí nad Labem (German: Aussig), Czechoslovakia, into the German-Czech family of Wilhelm and Josefa (née Kladivová) Edelmann. In 1946 his whole family – regardless of their mixed ethnic roots – was expelled into Germany and they settled in its western part. From 1953 to 1958 Heinz studied printmaking at the Kunstakademie Düsseldorf (Düsseldorf Arts Academy). He began his career as a freelance illustrator and designer for theatre posters and advertising in West Germany.

Between 1961 and 1969 he was a regular illustrator and cover designer for the internationally renowned youth magazine twen. During 1967–68, he worked on the film Yellow Submarine. In 1968, with Charlie Jenkins and Alison de Vere, he made The Transformer, the opening title for the Cambridge Animation Festival. From 1968 to 1970 he was a partner in a small animation company in London, but his desire at the time to work on more feature films was not realised. In 1970 Edelmann moved to Amsterdam and designed book jackets and posters for plays and films. His last use of the style of Yellow Submarine was in illustrating a book, Andromedar SR1 (1970), about a voyage to Mars. He also designed the cover for a German edition of Tolkien's The Lord of the Rings, and illustrated the Kenneth Grahame children's book The Wind in the Willows.

Between 1972 and 1976, Edelmann taught industrial graphic design at Fachhochschule Düsseldorf (Düsseldorf University of Applied Sciences). He was subsequently Lecturer of Art and Design at Fachhochschule Köln (Cologne University of Applied Sciences) and in 1989 became Professor of Illustration at the State Academy of Fine Arts Stuttgart. He designed the 1992 Seville World's Fair mascot, Curro.

Edelmann died from heart disease and kidney failure in Stuttgart, aged 75.
