= Pinscreen animation =

Animation technique

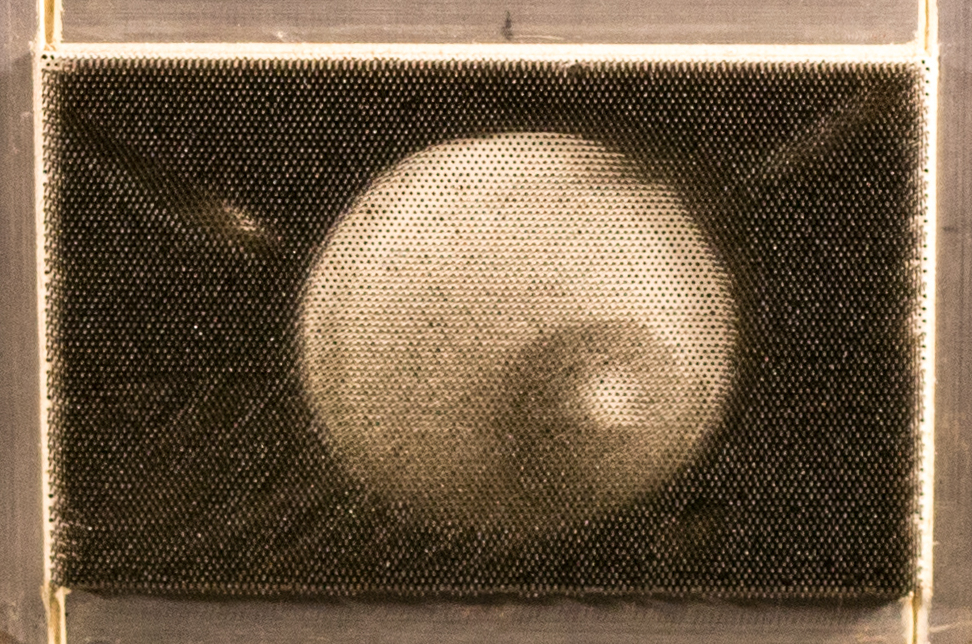
An image on a pinscreen

Pinscreen animation is an animation technique that makes use of a screen filled with movable pins, which can be moved in or out by pressing an object onto the screen. The screen is lit from the side so that the pins cast shadows. The technique has been used to create animated films with a range of textural effects difficult to achieve with any other animation technique, including traditional cel animation.

== Origin ==
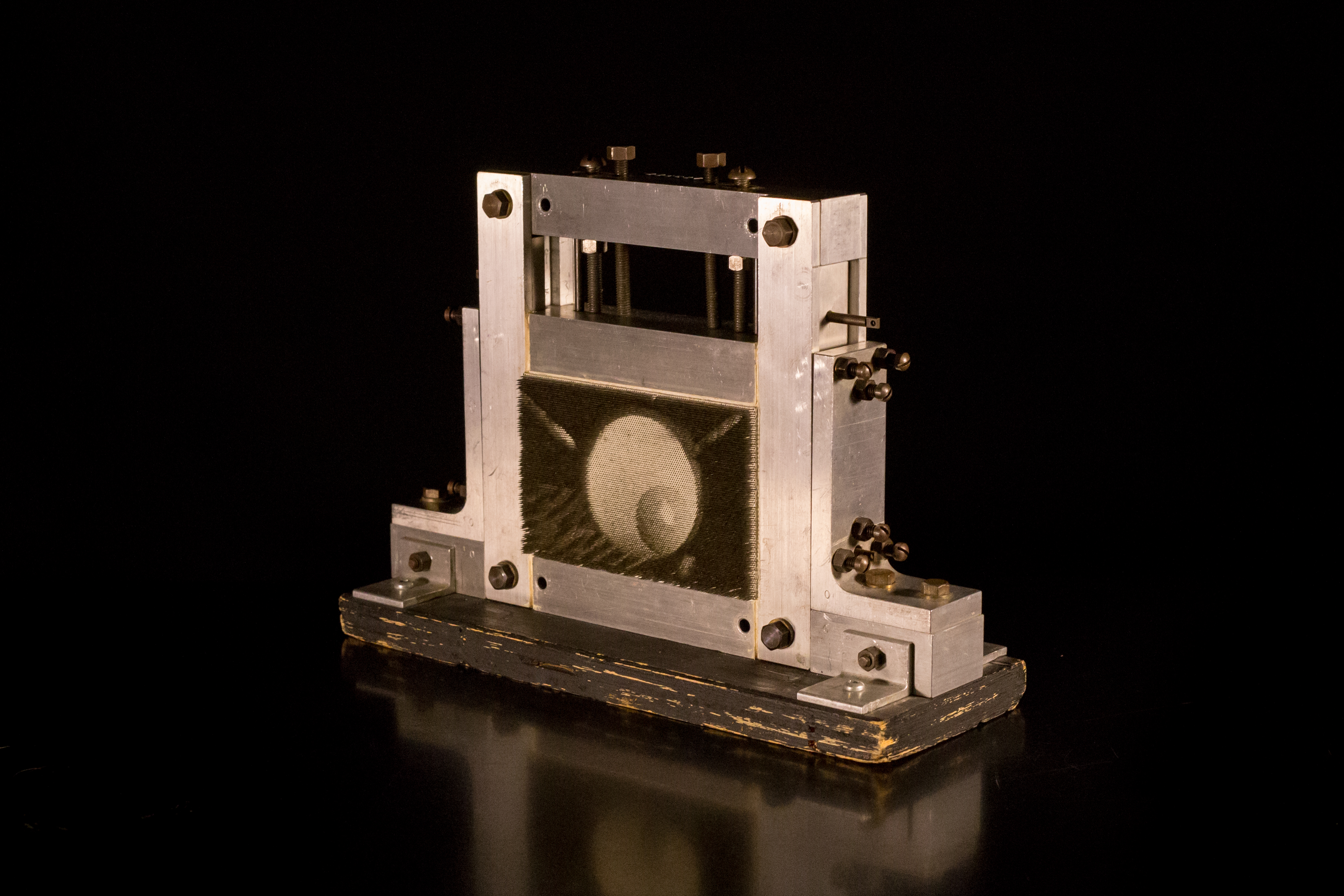
Pinscreen used for animation (Baby Screen model)

The technique was invented and developed by Alexandre Alexeïeff and his wife Claire Parker in their own studio in Paris, between 1932 (first tests) and 1935, when Claire Parker registered in her own name the Brevet d'Invention no 792340 at the Direction de la Propriété Industrielle, Ministère du Commerce et de L'Industrie, République Française, Paris. They made a total of six very short films with it, over a period of fifty years. The films have short running time, because the device is difficult to use, and have a monochrome nature, due to the images being created using shadows over a white surface.

There is no material evidence that the National Film Board of Canada was involved in the development of the technique. The National Film Board of Canada did buy one of the pinboards built by them and, as guests of the NFB, on August 7, 1972, Alexeïeff and Parker demonstrated the pinscreen to a group of animators at the NFB. Due to Cecile Starr (friend of Alexeieff and Parker, and distributor of their work in the US) most insistent intervention talking to Norman McLaren that the opportunity should not be missed to preserve Alexeïeff's knowledge, this demonstration was filmed, and later released by the NFB as Pin Screen. This film, along with "Pinscreen Tests" (1961), appear on disc 7 of the Norman McLaren: The Master's Edition DVD collection. In this film several animators can be seen in the end of the demonstration experimenting with the pinscreen board, including Caroline Leaf.

Until his retirement in 2005, the National Film Board's Jacques Drouin remained involved in pinscreen animation. Drouin's pinscreen work included the 1976 film Mindscape (Le paysagiste). He later passed his pinscreen on to Michèle Lemieux, who used the pinscreen with support of the NFB for her films Here and the Great Elsewhere (Le Grand ailleurs et le petit ici) and The Painting (Le Tableau).

In 2015, the CNC acquired and restored the Épinette, the last pinscreen that Alexeïeff and Parker built in 1977. Eight artists were invited to train on the newly restored device, under the direction of Lemieux as part of an initiative to inspire a new generation of pinscreen artists. French animator Justine Vuylsteker was one of the artists selected for the intensive four-week residency on the Épinette. This residency led Vuylsteker to complete the short film Embraced in 2018.

== The pinscreen device ==
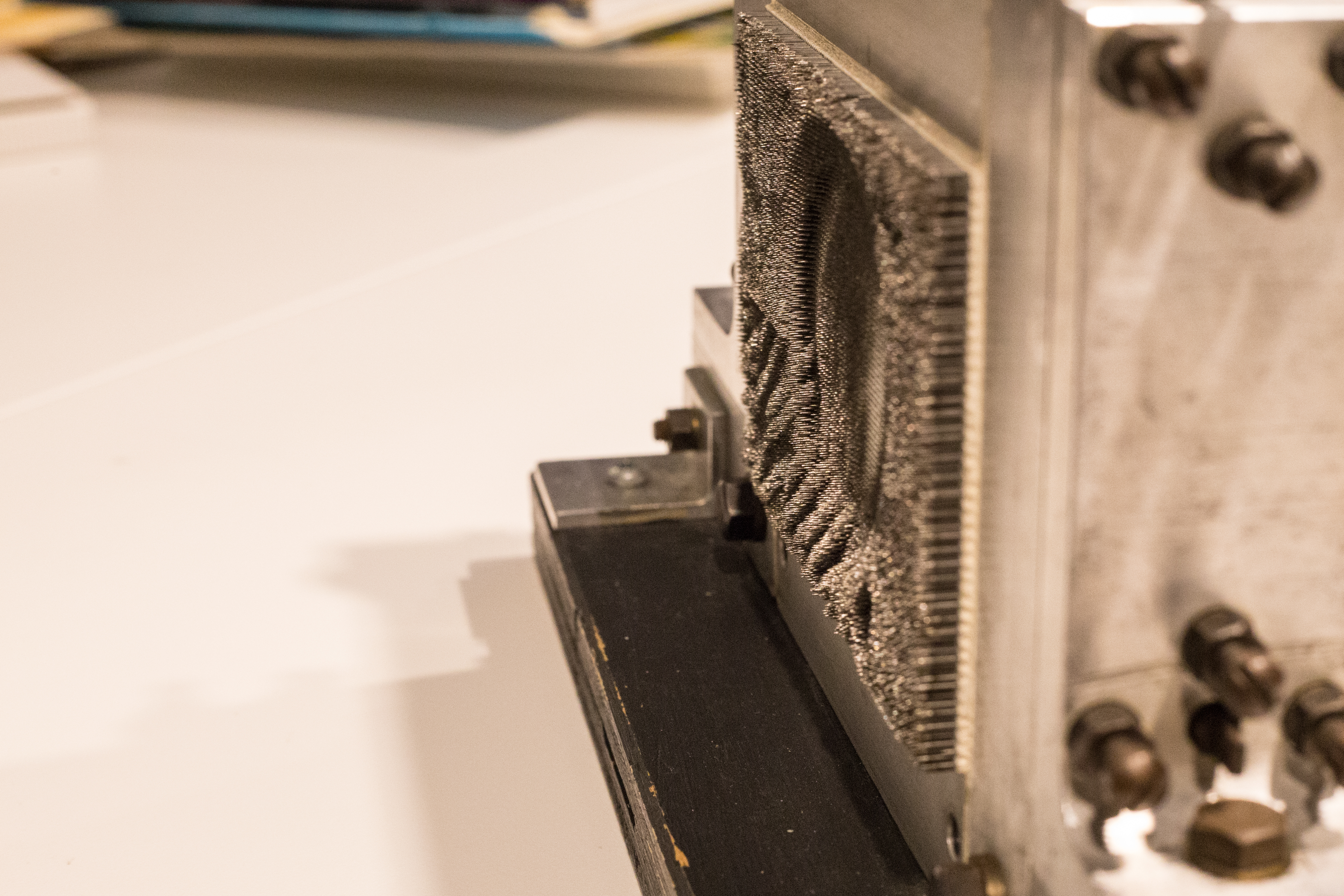
Close-up of a Baby Screen pinscreen from aside

A pinscreen is a white screen perforated with thousands of pins in small holes. Light shines from the side of the screen causing each pin to cast a shadow. Each pin, being able to slide back and forth through the holes, can cast different shadows. The pins do not move easily, presenting some resistance to movement in order to avoid unintended dislocation and thus image error. The pins' motion resistance depends on the pinscreen calibration. The white screen becomes darker the farther the pins are pushed out, protruding from the surface. The more the pins are pushed in less shadows are cast, the lighter the screen becomes, giving a grayish tone and eventually an all-white screen again.

== The animation technique ==
According to Claire Parker, the images created by the pinscreen made it possible to make an animated movie which escaped from the flat, "comic" aspect of cel animation and plunged instead into the dramatic and the poetic by the exploitation of chiaroscuro, or shading effects. To obtain the desired gray tones that are cast from the shadows of the pins, several methods are used.

The original pinscreens built and used by Alexeïeff and Parker had more than 1 million pins. Today those pinscreens are at National Center of Cinematography and the moving image, near Paris. The pinscreen currently in Montreal, at National Film Board of Canada, has 240,000 pins. The pins are usually pressed with a small tool, groups of pins at a time, or with other specialized instruments. Being so thin, it is very difficult, and actually not desirable, to manipulate individual pins: moving one pin at a time there is the risk that it bends, thus ruining the pinscreen. Furthermore, the shadow cast by one single pin is negligible, almost non perceivable; only when manipulated in groups are the pins' shadows sufficiently dense to produce the chiaroscuro effect. Groups of pins are pressed and protruded with different tools, from specially created ones to more mundane, such as lamp bulbs, spoons, forks, and even Russian Matryoshka dolls. Frames are created one at a time, each frame being the incremental modification of the previous one. After each frame has been photographed, the images are strung together to create an image without pauses. The frame assembly containing the pins was built very solidly and mounted in a secure fashion to offer a stable image to the animation camera day after day, week after week as each image of the movie was painstakingly composed.

This form of animation is extremely time consuming and difficult to execute, rendering it the least popular method of animation. An additional reason for its unpopularity is its expense. The individual pins are relatively cheap but it is not uncommon for a million or more to be used in a single screen, geometrically increasing their manufacturing cost.

Probably the most famous use of Pin Screen technique is Orson Welles' 1962 film of Kafka's novel The Trial; the film's introduction features a brief pin screen animation, elements of which reappear in a later scene projected onto and behind the actors.

== Digital pinscreen animation ==
Because of the cost and labor-intensive animation process, several computer programs have been made with the goal of simulating the images generated by a physical pinscreen. One of the advantages of using digital pinscreen animation is the recovery of images. With the traditional pinscreen, there is no way to recover a previous image except for creating it all over again with no guarantee of precision. With digital pinscreen, the same image can be retrieved and altered without having to be recreated.

== See also ==
- Refreshable braille display
