= Here and the Great Elsewhere =

- French: Le Grand ailleurs et le petit ici
- Directed by: Michèle Lemieux
- Written by: Michèle Lemieux
- Produced by: Julie Roy
- Edited by: Annie Jean
- Music by: Armand Amar
- Animation by: Michèle Lemieux
- Production company: National Film Board of Canada
- Release date: February 15, 2012 (RVCQ)
- Running time: 14 minutes
- Country: Canada

Here and the Great Elsewhere (French: Le Grand ailleurs et le petit ici) is a Canadian animated short film, directed by Michèle Lemieux and released in 2012. Made using pinscreen animation, the film is a philosophical meditation on the ultimate meaning of life, through the story of an everyman figure confronting existential mysteries about the universe.

Lemieux made the film on the pinscreen given to her by animator Jacques Drouin.

The film premiered at the 2012 Rendez-vous du cinéma québécois.

It was the winner of the Grand Prix at the Cinemania festival in Portugal, and was a Jutra Award nominee for Best Animated Short Film at the 15th Jutra Awards in 2013.
