= Mindscape (1976 film) =

- French: Le Paysagiste
- Directed by: Jacques Drouin
- Written by: Jacques Drouin
- Produced by: Gaston Sarault
- Edited by: Jacques Drouin
- Music by: Denis Larochelle
- Production company: National Film Board of Canada
- Release date: 1976
- Running time: 7 minutes, 31 seconds
- Country: Canada
- Languages: English, French
- Budget: $38,740

Mindscape (French: Le Paysagiste) is a 1976 pinscreen animation short film by Jacques Drouin, produced by the National Film Board of Canada.

== Production ==
It was Drouin's second pinscreen work, after his 1974 work Trois exercices sur l'écran d'épingles d'Alexeieff.

The film had a budget of $38,740 (equivalent to $204,537 in 2025).

== Summary ==
A film without dialogue, Mindscape shows an artist stepping inside his painting and wandering through a symbolically rich landscape.

== Awards ==
- Ottawa International Animation Festival, Ottawa: Special Jury Award, 1976
- CINANIMA International Animated Film Festival, Espinho, Portugal - Silver Dolphin for the Best Film 3–11 minutes (tie), 1977
- Chicago International Film Festival, Chicago: Bronze Hugo, 1977
- Columbus International Film & Animation Festival, Columbus, Ohio: Chris Bronze Plaque, 1977
- Linz International Short Film Festival, Linz: Special Award for Best Musical Adaptation for a Film, 1977
- Yorkton Film Festival, Yorkton: Golden Sheaf Award for Best Animated Film, 1977
- Golden Gate International Film Festival, San Francisco: Diploma for Outstanding Achievement, 1977
- International Short Film Festival Oberhausen, Oberhausen: Diploma of Honour by the International Jury, 1977
- HEMISFILM, San Antonio, TX: Bronze Medal, 1977
- Virgin Islands International Animated Film Festival, St. Thomas: Silver Venus for Best Short Film, 1977
- Long Island Film Festival, Long Island: Golden Image Award, First Prize, 1977
- American Film and Video Festival, New York: Red Ribbon, Visual Essays, 1978
- Baltimore Film Festival, Baltimore: First Prize, Best Film of the Festival, 1978
- Baltimore Film Festival, Baltimore: First Prize, Animation, 1978
- Southwest Film Festival, Tulsa: First Prize, Professional, 1978
- Kenyon Film Festival, Gambier, Ohio: First Jury Prize, 1978
- Athens Short Film Festival, Athens, Georgia: Award of Merit, 1978

== Works cited ==
- Evans, Gary (1991). In the National Interest: A Chronicle of the National Film Board of Canada from 1949 to 1989. University of Toronto Press. ISBN 0802027849.
