= Michèle Lemieux =

Canadian illustrator and animator

Michèle Lemieux (born May 29, 1955) is a Canadian illustrator and animator.

== Awards ==
Award	Year	Category	Work	Result	Ref(s)
Governor General's Awards	1989	English-language children's illustration	A Gift from Saint Francis	Nominated	
Governor General's Awards	1991	English-language children's illustration	Peter and the Wolf	Nominated	
Governor General's Awards	1994	English-language children's illustration	There Was An Old Man...: A Collection of Limericks	Nominated	
Governor General's Awards	1999	French-language children's illustration	Nuit d'orage	Nominated	
IBBY Canada	2000	Elizabeth Mrazik-Cleaver Canadian Picture Book Award	Stormy Night	Won	
Genie Awards	2003	Best Animated Short	Stormy Night (Nuit d'orage)	Nominated	
Jutra Awards	2013	Best Animated Short Film	Here and the Great Elsewhere (Le grand ailleurs et le petit ici)	Nominated	
Quebec Cinema Awards	2025	Best Animated Short Film	The Painting (Le Tableau)	Nominated	
