= Claire Parker =

American engineer and animator

- Parker at the pinscreen
- Born: August 31, 1906
- Died: October 3, 1981 (aged 75)
- Known for: Engineering, Animation
- Spouse: Alexandre Alexeieff (m. 1940)

Claire Parker (August 31, 1906 – October 3, 1981) was an American engineer and animator. A graduate of MIT, she invented the Pinscreen, a vertically mounted grid of between 240,000 and 1 million sliding metal rods that are first manually pushed into position to create lit and shaded areas, then filmed frame by frame. While the hand-operated, mechanical Pinscreen superficially shares characteristics with early optical toys like the zoetrope, it is distinguished by being one of the first devices ever to produce animation by reconfiguring a set of individual picture elements, later called pixels. A model with sufficient pin "resolution" can be used to create a Pinscreen animation of photorealistic images, a painstaking process analogous to modern pixel art.

Parker shared directing credits for her films with her husband and collaborator, Russian animator Alexandre Alexeieff; however, the 1935 French and 1937 U.S. patents on the Pinscreen were made in her name alone. Alexeieff and Parker's Pinscreen films include Night on Bald Mountain (1933) and The Nose (1963), as well as the opening title sequence for Orson Welles' film The Trial (1962). As of 2012, the last known original Pinscreen still being used in animation production is maintained at the National Film Board of Canada's main campus in Montreal. A second screen was constructed and put into production in 2018.
