= 2021 Festival du nouveau cinéma =

Film festival in Montreal, Canada

- Opening film: Bootlegger by Caroline Monnet
- Closing film: Archipelago (Archipel) by Félix Dufour-Laperrière
- Location: Montreal, Quebec, Canada
- Founded: 1971
- Festival date: October 6–17, 2021
- Website: nouveaucinema.ca/en

Festival du nouveau cinéma
- 2022 2020

The 2021 edition of the Festival du nouveau cinéma, the 50th edition in the event's history, took place from October 6 to 17, 2021 in Montreal, Quebec, Canada. Due to the COVID-19 pandemic in Quebec, it was staged as a hybrid event, with a mixture of in-person and online screenings; although the festival officially concluded on October 17, the online platform remained open until October 31.

The festival opened with the film Bootlegger by Caroline Monnet, and closed with Félix Dufour-Laperrière's film Archipelago (Archipel). Marking the 50th anniversary of the festival, Bootlegger was also paired with 50 temps, a short documentary film about the festival by Luc Bourdon.

== Awards ==
Award winners were announced on October 18 at the conclusion of the festival.

Award	Film	Filmmaker
National Competition, Grand Prize	Night Raiders	Danis Goulet
National Competition, Prix de la diffusion Québécor	The Noise of Engines (Le Bruit des moteurs)	Philippe Grégoire
National Competition, Prix de la diffusion Québécor Honorable Mention	The White Fortress (Tabija)	Igor Drljaca
International Competition, Grand Prize	Great Freedom (Große Freiheit)	Sebastian Meise
International Competition, Prix de l’innovation Daniel Langlois	The Crossing (La Traversée)	Florence Miailhe
International Competition, Prix de l’innovation Daniel Langlois Honorable Mention	Taste (Vi)	Lê Bào
International Competition, Best Acting Performance	Moon, 66 Questions (Selini, 66 erotiseis)	Sofia Kokkali
FIPRESCI International Critics Prize	Damascus Dreams	Émilie Serri
Eurimages Audentia Award	The Crossing (La Traversée)	Florence Miailhe
New Alchemists Prize	Esqui	Manque La Banca
New Alchemists Prize Honorable Mention	The Child of Plomo (El Niño del Plomo)	Daniel Dávila
Panorama Prize	Gallant Indies (Les Indes Galantes)	Philippe Béziat
Temps 0 Public Prize	Some Like It Rare (Barbaque)	Fabrice Éboué
Temps 0 Public Prize	Vortex	Gaspar Noé
P'tits Loups	Dans la nature	Marcel Barelli
FNC Explore Panorama Prize	In the Mist	Chou Tung-Yen
FNC Explore Horizon Prize	Marco and Polo Go Round	Benjamin Steiger Levine
FNC Explore Horizon Prize Honorable Mention	Goliath: Playing with Reality	Barry Gene Murphy, May Abdalla
National Competition, Short Film	In the Jam Jar	Colin Nixon
National Competition, Short Film Public Prize	In the Jam Jar	Colin Nixon
International Competition, Short Film	A Present Light (Luz de Presença)	Diogo Costa Amarante
International Competition, Short Film Honorable Mention	My Uncle Tudor (Nanu Tudor)	Olga Lucovnicova
New Alchemists, Animated Short Film	Love, Dad (Mily tati)	Diana Cam Van Nguyen
New Alchemists, National Dada Prize	Boobs (Lolos)	Marie Valade
New Alchemists, International Dada Prize	Happy Valley	Simon Liu
RPCÉ Grand Prize	Roots Home	Audrey Rainville
RCPÉ Honorable Mentions	Project Human Revival	Yuqian Zhang
RCPÉ Honorable Mentions	Université de Sisyphe	Étienne Pouy
Pitch Première Oeuvre	Adieu Minette	Sarra El Abed
Pitch Première Oeuvre Special Mention	Home of the Flying Moons	Victoria Catherine Chan
Nouveau Marché	Bells of Kabul	Chabname Zariab
Nouveau Marché Special Mentions	Mexico 1986	César Diaz
Nouveau Marché Special Mentions	Motherhood	Meryam Joobeur
Jury Prize, Virtual Reality	Fight Back VR	Céline Tricart
Jury Prize, Virtual Reality	Future Rites	Sandra Rodriguez, Alexander Whitley

== Official selections ==
=== International Competition ===
English title	Original title	Director(s)	Production country
The Crossing	La Traversée	Florence Miailhe	France, Germany, Czech Republic
District Terminal		Bardia Yadegari, Ehsan Mirhosseini	Iran, Germany
Great Freedom	Große Freiheit	Sebastian Meise	Austria, Germany
In the Mirror	Spogulī	Laila Pakalnina	Latvia, Lithuania
Miguel's War		Eliane Raheb	Germany, Lebanon, Spain
Moon, 66 Questions	Selini, 66 erotiseis	Jacqueline Lentzou	France, Greece
Passion		Maja Borg	Sweden, Spain
The Pink Cloud	A Nuvem Rosa	Iuli Gerbase	Brazil
Taste	VỊ	Lê Bảo	Vietnam, Singapore, France, Thailand, Germany, Taiwan
What Do We See When We Look at the Sky?		Alexandre Koberidze	Germany, Georgia

=== National Competition ===
English title	Original title	Director(s)	Production country
La Contemplation du mystère		Albéric Aurtenèche	Canada
Damascus Dreams		Émilie Serri	Canada
Darkroom		Lukas Maier	Canada
Night Raiders		Danis Goulet	Canada
The Noise of Engines	La Bruit des moteurs	Philippe Grégoire	Canada
Nouveau Québec		Sarah Fortin	Canada
Ste. Anne		Rhayne Vermette	Canada
The White Fortress	Tabija	Igor Drljaca	Canada
Wildhood		Bretten Hannam	Canada

=== International Panorama ===
English title	Original title	Director(s)	Production country
1970		Tomasz Wolski	Poland
Bliss	Glück	Henrika Kull	Germany
Celts	Kelti	Milica Tomović	Serbia
Compartment No. 6	Hytti nro 6	Juho Kuosmanen	Finland, Estonia, Germany, Russia
The Fam	La Mif	Fred Baillif	Switzerland
Faya Dayi		Jessica Beshir	United States, Ethiopia, Qatar
Gagarine	Gagarin	Fanny Liatard, Jérémy Trouilh	France
Gallant Indies	Les Indes Galantes	Philippe Béziat	France
The Girl and the Spider	Das Mädchen und die Spinne	Ramon Zürcher, Silvan Zürcher	Switzerland
Hit the Road	Jadde Khaki	Panah Panahi	Iran
Mr. Bachmann and His Class	Herr Bachmann und Seine Classe	Maria Speth	Germany
Unclenching the Fists	Razzhimaya kulaki	Kira Kovalenko	Russia
The Velvet Queen	La Panthère des neiges	Marie Amiguet, Vincent Munier	France
Venus by Water	Shui Bian Wei Na Si	Lin Wang	China
Wood and Water		Jonas Bak	Germany, France

=== The New Alchemists (Les Nouveaux alchimistes) ===
English title	Original title	Director(s)	Production country
The Child of Plomo	El Niño del Plomo	Daniel Dávila	Chile
Come Here		Anocha Suwichakornpong	Thailand
The Edge of Daybreak	Phayasohk phiyohkyam	Taiki Sakpisit	Thailand, Australia
The Fisherman's Daughter	Tzarevna Scaling	Uldus Bakhtiozina	Russia
Letters to a Young Traveller	Lettres à un jeune voyageur	Federico Hidalgo	Canada
The Penultimate	Den Næstsidste	Jonas Kærup Hjort	Denmark
Ski	Esquí	Manque La Banca	Argentina, Brazil
Ste. Anne		Rhayne Vermette	Canada
Virgin Blue	Bu yao zai jian a, Yu hua tang	Niu Xiaoyu	China

=== The Essentials (Les Incontournables) ===
English title	Original title	Director(s)	Production country
Ahed's Knee	Haberek	Nadav Lapid	Israel, France, Germany
Bad Luck Banging or Loony Porn	Babardeală cu bucluc sau porno balamuc	Radu Jude	Romania
Days	Rìzi	Tsai Ming-Liang	Taiwan
Dune		Denis Villeneuve	United States
Earwig		Lucile Hadžihalilović	United Kingdom, Belgium, France
The Hand of God	È stata la mano di Dio	Paolo Sorrentino	Italy
A Hero	Qahremaan	Asghar Farhadi	Iran, France
In Front of Your Face	dangsin eolgul ap-eseo	Hong Sang-soo	South Korea
Introduction	Inteurodeoksyeon	Hong Sang-soo	South Korea
Memoria		Apichatpong Weerasethakul	Thailand
Parallel Mothers	Madres paralelas	Pedro Almodóvar	Spain
Paris, 13th District	Les Olympiades	Jacques Audiard	France
The Power of the Dog		Jane Campion	New Zealand, United Kingdom, Canada, Australia
Red Rocket		Sean Baker	United States
Reflection	Vidblysk	Valentyn Vasyanovych	Ukraine
The Star		Nadav Lapid	Israel, United States
Tralala		Arnaud Larrieu, Jean-Marie Larrieu	France
Wheel of Fortune and Fantasy	Gūzen to Sōzō	Ryusuke Hamaguchi	Japan
The Worst Person in the World	Verdens verste menneske	Joachim Trier	Norway, France, Denmark, Sweden

=== Temps 0 ===
English title	Original title	Director(s)	Production country
After Blue	Paradis sale	Bertrand Mandico	France
The Amusement Park		George A. Romero	United States
Asmodeus		Éric Falardeau	Canada
Bloody Oranges	Oranges sanguines	Jean-Christophe Meurisse	France
Bound		Jean-Armand Bougrelle	Japan
Dead Flash		Bertrand Mandico	France
Extraneous Matter		Kenichi Ugana	Japan
For a Fistful of Fries	Poulet frites	Yves Hinant, Jean Libon	France, Belgium
Fou de Bassan		Yann Gonzalez	France
Freakscene: The Story of Dinosaur Jr.		Philipp Reichenheim	Germany, United States
Hiruko the Goblin	Yōkai Hantā: Hiruko	Shinya Tsukamoto	Japan
Irréversible	Gaspar Noé	France	
The Last Temptation of the Belgians	La Dernière tentation des Belges	Jan Bucquoy	Belgium
Lux Æterna		Gaspar Noé	France
Music Hole		David Mutzenmacher, Gaetan Liekens	Belgium
North Shinjuku 2055		Daisuke Miyazaki	Japan
Saloum		Jean Luc Herbulot	Senegal, France
Some Like It Rare	Barbaque	Fabrice Éboué	France
Taxidermize Me	Taxidermisez-moi	Marie Losier	France
Those Who Care	Debout les femmes !	François Ruffin, Gilles Perret	France
Vortex		Gaspar Noé	France
Zeria		Harry Cleven	Belgium

=== Special Presentations ===
English title	Original title	Director(s)	Production country
Angakusajaujuq: The Shaman's Apprentice		Zacharias Kunuk	Canada
Atanarjuat: The Fast Runner	ᐊᑕᓈᕐᔪᐊᑦ	Zacharias Kunuk	Canada
Dream Life	La vie rêvée	Mireille Dansereau	Canada
Drunken Birds	Les Oiseaux ivres	Ivan Grbovic	Canada
The Left-Hand Side of the Fridge	La moitié gauche du frigo	Philippe Falardeau	Canada
Mulholland Drive	David Lynch	United States	
Possession		Andrzej Żuławski	France, Germany
Ville Neuve		Félix Dufour-Laperrière	Canada
West of Pluto	À l'ouest de Pluton	Myriam Verreault, Henry Bernadet	Canada

=== International Competition for Short Films ===
English title	Original title	Director(s)	Production country
After a Room		Naomi Pacifique	United Kingdom, Netherlands, Switzerland
Atér		Marie Fages	France
Dihya		Lucia Martinez Garcia	Switzerland
Fata Morgana		Nitzan Rozen	Israel
Hotel Royal		Salomé Lamas	Portugal
How to Die Young in Manila		Petersen Vargas	Philippines
Inherent		Nicolai G.H. Johansen	France
Jesus Egon Christus		Saša Vajda, David Vajda	Germany
Lemongrass Girl		Pom Bunsermvicha	Thailand
Let's Do This Again Sometime		Petrus van Staden	South Africa, Spain
The Men Who Wait	Les Attendants	Truong Minh Quý	France, Singapore
Motorcyclist’s Happiness Won’t Fit Into His Suit	Al motociclista no le cabe la felicidad en el traje	Gabriel Herrera	Mexico
My Uncle Tudor	Nanu Tudor	Olga Lucovnicova	Belgium, Hungary, Portugal, Moldova
Neon Phantom	Fantasma Neon	Leonardo Martinelli	Brazil
New Abnormal	Pid Pokati Mai	Sorayos Prapapan	Thailand, South Korea, Singapore
On Solid Ground	Über Wasser	Jela Hasler	Switzerland
The Parents' Room		Diego Marcon	Italy
Potted Palm Trees	Topfpalmen	Rosa Friedrich	Germany
A Present Light	Luz de Presença	Diogo Costa Amarante	Portugal
Sandstorm	Mulaqat	Seemab Gul	Pakistan, United Kingdom
Sunrise in My Mind	Tngaireah knong chet	Danech San	Cambodia
Sycorax		Lois Patiño, Matías Piñeiro	Spain, Portugal
Techno, Mama		Saulius Baradinskas	Lithuania
Widow & Orphan	Hurenkind und Schusterjunge	Niklas Pollmann	Austria

=== National Competition for Short Films ===
English title	Original title	Director(s)	Province
Abuela		Rebeca Ortiz	Ontario
BàBà		Dorothy Sing Zhang	Ontario
Between Realities Along the Edge of Time		Jessica Huras	Ontario
Big Brother	Grand frère	Rémi St-Michel	Quebec
Bump		Maziyar Khatam	Ontario
Celle qui reste		Alex B. Martin	Quebec
Defund		Khadijah Roberts-Abdullah, Araya Mengesha	Ontario
Dear Mr. Dudley		Morgan Tams	British Columbia
Deep Blue	Fond bleu	Franie-Éléonore Bernier	Quebec
Fanmi		Sandrine Brodeur-Desrosiers, Carmine Pierre-Dufour	Quebec
Fuckin' Coffin	Cercueil, tabarnak!	Loïc Darses	Quebec
The Horses		Liz Cairns	British Columbia
In the Jam Jar		Colin Nixon	Quebec
Joutel		Alexa-Jeanne Dubé	Quebec
Louise from 9 to 5	Louise de 9 à 5	Julien G. Marcotte	Quebec
Nalujuk Night		Jennie Williams	Newfoundland and Labrador
OK		Virginie Nolin	Quebec
Ousmane		Jorge Camarotti	Quebec
Perfecting the Art of Longing		Kitra Cahana	Quebec
Personals		Sasha Argirov	British Columbia
Resonance	Résonance	Maxime-Claude L'Écuyer	Quebec
River Boy Blues		Jerome Yoo	British Columbia
See You Garbage!	Au plaisir les ordures!	Romain Dumont	Quebec
Tibbits Hill		Édith Jorisch	Quebec
Tigress		Maya Bastian	Ontario
Together		Albert Shin	Ontario
Twelve Hours		Paul Shkordoff	Ontario
A Void		Dominique van Olm	Ontario

=== Special Presentations Short Films ===
English title	Original title	Director(s)	Country
Ataguttaaluk: A Life to Live		Carol Kunnuk	Canada
Auto Portrait / Self Portrait Post Partum		Louise Bourque	Canada
Barcelona Burning	Barcelona de Foc	Theodore Ushev	Canada
Benjamin, Benny, Ben		Paul Shkordoff	Canada
A Blue Room	Une chambre bleue	Tomasz Siwinski	France
La Cage		Marc Paradis	Canada
Délivre-nous du mal		Marc Paradis	Canada
Foam	Écume	Omar Elhamy	Canada
From Roots to Leaves		Melissa Simon	Canada
Hitchhiking		Frank Vitale	Canada
L'Incident Jones		Marc Paradis	Canada
Inuktitut Dialects in the 21st Century		Ulivia Uviluk	Canada
Islands	Les Îles	Yann Gonzalez	France
Kuujjuaq		Sammy Gadbois	Canada
Letter to a Lover	Lettre à un amant	Marc Paradis	Canada
Little Brother	Petit frère	Rémi St-Michel	Canada
Oh What a Wonderful Feeling		François Jaros	Canada
Réminiscences Carnivores		Marc Paradis	Canada
Selva		Sofía Quirós Ubeda	Costa Rica, Argentina, Chile
Shooting Star	Comme une comète	Ariane Louis-Seize	Canada
Le soleil brille pour tout le monde mais les hommes préfèrent les blondes		Sylvie Laliberté	Canada
Système des beaux-arts		Daniel Dion	Canada
The Tesla World Light		Matthew Rankin	Canada
Vice, vertu et vice-versa		Manon Labrecque	Canada
A Way of Life		Dorothy Mesher	Canada

=== The New Alchemists, Short Films ===
English title	Original title	Director(s)	Production country
3XShapes of Home		Elisabeth Brun	Norway
An Accumulation of Our Aftermaths		Solomon Nagler	Canada
Anxious Body		Yoriko Mizushiri	Japan
Anthologie 2020		Michael Yaroshevsky, Glauco Bermudez, Erin Weisgerber, Olivier Godin, Simran Dewan, Isabelle Stachtchenko, Matthew Wolkow, Miryam Charles, Jessica Lee Gagné, Van Royko	Canada
Boobs	Lolos	Marie Valade	Canada
The Capacity for Adequate Anger		Vika Kirchenbauer	Germany
The Coast		Sohrab Hura	India
Constrain	Contraindre	Antoine Fontaine, Galdric Fleury	France
The Detection of Faint Companions		Sandro Aguilar	Portugal
Dust Bath		Seth A. Smith	Canada
earthearthearth		Daïchi Saïto	Canada
Eidolon		Mike Rollo	Canada
First Time (The Time for All But Sunset: Violet)		Nicolaas Schmidt	Germany
Fleeting: Here & There		Gilnaz Arzpeyma	Canada
The Guy on the Bed		Mike Hoolboom	Canada
The Hangman at Home	Le Bourreau chez lui	Michelle Kranot, Uri Kranot	Denmark, France, Canada
Happy Life	La Vie Heureuse	Amélie Hardy	Canada
Happy Valley		Simon Liu	Hong Kong
Heat		Peter Kutin, Florian Kindlinger	Austria
Los Huesos		Cristóbal León, Joaquín Cociña	Chile
I Am Not		Julien Bouthillier	Canada
I Gotta Look Good for the Apocalypse		Ayce Kartal	France
A Lack of Clarity		Stefan Kruse Jørgensen	Denmark
Love, Dad	Mily tati	Diana Cam Van Nguyen	France
Moon River		Misha Horacek	Canada
Notes from the Periphery		Tulapop Saenjaroen	Thailand, United Kingdom
One Thousand and One Attempts to Be an Ocean		Yuyan Wang	France
Portage Place Mall (With Love)		Ryan Steel	Canada
Scum Mutation		Ov .	France
Skinned		Mike Hoolboom	Canada
Sometimes a Little Sin Is Good for the Soul		Alex Beriault	Canada, Germany
Song for the New World	Chanson pour le nouveau monde	Miryam Charles	Canada
The Sunset Special		Nicolas Gebbe	Germany
There Is, Indeed, the Unspeakable	Es gibt allerdings Unaussprechliches	Marzieh Emadi, Sina Sadaat	Austria
They Dance With Their Heads	Ils dansent avec leurs têtes	Thomas Corriveau	Canada
Thinner Than Two Ten-Thousandths of a Millimetre	Dünner als zwei Zehntausendstel eines Millimeters	Gregor Eldarb	Austria
Train Again		Peter Tscherkassky	Austria
Tunable Mimoid		Vladimir Todorovic	Australia
Vadim on a Walk		Sasha Svirsky	Russia
We'll Find You When the Sun Goes Black		Anouk De Clercq	Belgium, Norway

=== RPCÉ Canadian Student Short Film Competition ===
English title	Original title	Director(s)	Province
All I Am Is Now		Patrick Custo-Blanch	Quebec
The Architect	L'Architecte	Mathieu Lorain Dignard	Quebec
The Awakening of the Ape	L'Éveil du singe	Philippe Besner	Quebec
A Chaos Filled with Poetry	Un chaos rempli de poésie	Daphné Cambronne	Quebec
Dors-tu?		Nadia Louis-Desmarchais	Quebec
Father Like Son		Anna Kuelken	Alberta
Life on the Move	La Vie sur la route	Jack Belhumeur	Alberta
Lifetime Loser	Perdant à vie	Yan Olivier	Quebec
The Morlock		A.P. Bergeron	Quebec
Nature morte		Julia Martel	Quebec
Paris, Ontario		Arnaud Weissenburger	Ontario
Project Human Revival		Yuqian Zhang	British Columbia
Roots Home		Audrey Rainville	Quebec
Souvenirs fragmentés		David Bianchetti	Quebec
Starting Out		Bruno Vompean	Ontario
The Static in My Skin		Emily Pickering	Alberta
L'Université de Sisyphe		Étienne Pouy	Quebec
Utopia		Jean-Félix Rioux	Quebec
La Ville fantôme		Marc-André Côté	Quebec

=== Student Short Films Not in Competition ===
English title	Original title	Director(s)	Province
20:12		Kevin Champagne-Lessard	Canada
La Cour des mirages		Zoé Pelchat	Canada
Cousins		Michal Haggiag	Israel
Empty Spaces		Ben Ziv	Israel
La Femme nue		Francis Lacelle	Canada
Le Froid		Natalia Duguay	Canada
Her Dance		Bar Cohen	Israel
Motel Paradise		Virgina Tangvald	Canada
Ouverture		Philippe Rioux	Canada
Wood		Max Dufaud	Canada

=== P'tits loups ===
Short film program of animation for children.

English title	Original title	Director(s)	Production country
Altaï		François Lagorce, Jean Lagorce	France
Bemol		Oana Lacroix	Switzerland
Cat and Bird	Saka sy vorona	Franka Sachse	Germany
Colin Pané		Paul Bouchart, Stéphanie Hu, Clément Opinel, Juliette Danesi, Camille Fruit	France
Colza		Victor Chagniot, Camille Broutin, Matthieu Daures, Victoria de Millo Gregory, Maxime Jouniot, Jade Khoo	France
Comment j'ai vaincu ma peur des humains		Hélène Ducrocq	France
Croc Marmottes		Benjamin Botella	France
The Displeasure	La Grogne	Alisi Telengut	Canada
Épreuves du matin		Masa Avramovic	France
The Finger of Death	Le Doigt de la mort	Mazarine Miloudi, Mélanie Levaux, Pauline Mahieu, Oriane Gros, Sébastien Pagès	France
The Frolic		Jhao Yi Han	Taiwan
House of Memory		Sofia Rosales Arreola	Mexico
Humanatee		Sea Jin Park	South Korea, United States
I Am a Pebble	Je suis un caillou	Melanie Berteraut Platon, Yasmine Bresson, Leo Coulombier, Nicolas Grondin, Maxime Le Chapelain, Louise Massé	France
In Nature	Dans la nature	Marcel Barelli	Switzerland
Itchy the Camel: Tennis Ball		Anders Beer, Pierre-Hughes Dallaire	Canada
Jean-Michel et les histoire interdites		Mathieu Auvray	France
Just for the Record		Vojin Vasovic	Canada, Serbia
Kiko and the Animals	Kiko et les animaux	Yawen Zheng	France, Switzerland
Lazare fait bien les choses		Thomas Appelman	France
Marguerite		Jasmine Dubé	Canada
Mega Mega Mega Mega Fête		Collective	Belgium
Mum Is Pouring Rain	Maman pleut des cordes	Hugo de Faucompret	France
Orgiastic Hyper-Plastic		Paul Bush	Denmark, United Kingdom
Patouille and the Parachute Seeds	Patouille, des graines en parachute	Inès Bernard-Espina, Mélody Boulissière, Clémentine Campos	France
Le Rire		Capucine Gougelet	France
A Splash in a Mud	Temps de cochon	Emmanuelle Gorgiard	France
A Stone in the Shoe	Un caillou dans la chaussure	Éric Montchaud	France, Switzerland
Trona Pinnacles		Mathilde Parquet	France
Vanille		Guillaume Lorin	France

=== FNC Explore ===
Virtual reality projects.

English title	Original title	Director(s)	Production country
Bystanding: The Feingold Syndrome		Nim Shapira, Roi Lev	Israel, Canada, Germany
End of Night		David Adler	Denmark, France
Far Away from Far Away		Bruce Alcock, Jeremy Mendes	Canada
Goliath: Playing with Reality		May Abdalla, Barry Gene Murphy	United Kingdom, France
Icarus		Michel Lemieux	Canada
In the Mist		Chou Tung-Yen	Taiwan
Marco & Polo Go Round		Benjamin Steiger Levine	Canada, Belgium
Madrid Noir		James A. Castillo	France, United Kingdom
Mindfield		Vincent Ladouceur	Canada
Myriad, Where We Connect		Michael Grotenhoff, Christian Zipfel	Germany, Austria
Once Upon a Sea		Adi Lavy	Israel, Canada
Otherly		Jessica Murwin, Grace An, Joanne Lam, Mirusha Yogarajah	Canada
Our Common Home	Notre habitat commun	Daniel Iregui	Canada
The Sick Rose		Huang Yun-Hsien, Tang Zhi-Zhong	Taiwan
