= In the Shadow of the Pines =

2020 film by Anne Koizumi

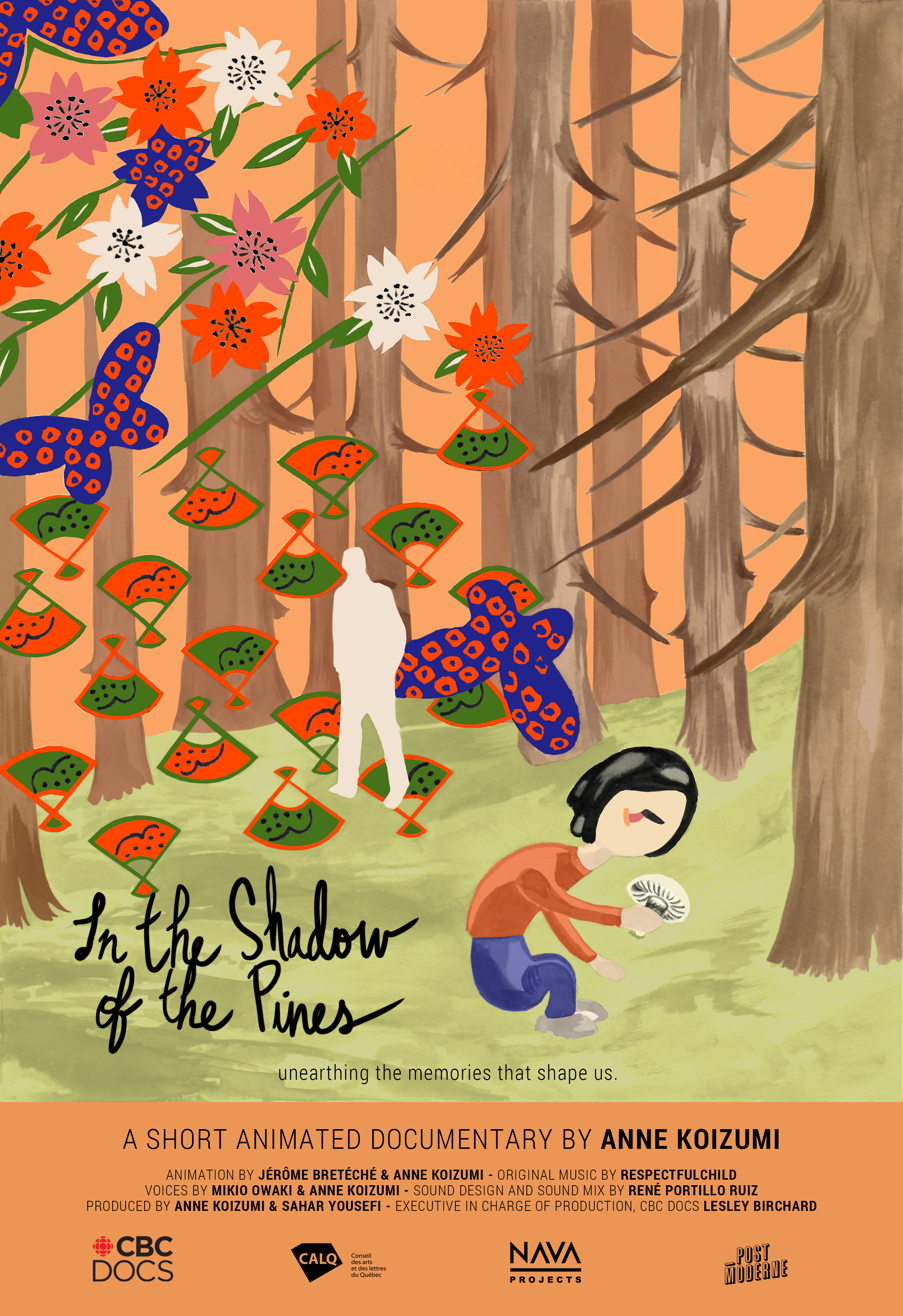
- Poster of the film In the Shadow of the Pines
- Directed by: Anne Koizumi
- Written by: Anne Koizumi
- Produced by: Anne Koizumi; Sahar Yousefi
- Starring: Mikio Owaki; Anne Koizumi
- Cinematography: Jérôme Bretéché; Anne Koizumi
- Edited by: Anne Koizumi
- Music by: respectfulchild
- Animation by: Jérôme Bretéché; Anne Koizumi
- Production companies: Nava Projects; Post Moderne
- Distributed by: Canadian Broadcasting Corporation
- Release date: April 24, 2020
- Running time: 7 minutes
- Country: Canada
- Languages: English; Japanese

In the Shadow of the Pines is a Canadian animated short documentary film, directed by Anne Koizumi and released in 2020. An exploration of her grief around the death of her father in the early 2010s, the film centres on an imagined conversation with him about her childhood shame that he was employed as the janitor at her school, thus exposing her to her classmates as the daughter of a working class immigrant.

Although Koizumi is an administrative employee of the National Film Board of Canada, she made the film independently rather than through her employer.

The film was screened at numerous documentary and animation film festivals in 2020 and 2021, and was added to CBC Gem. It received an honorable mention for the Betty Youson Award for Best Canadian Short Documentary at the 2020 Hot Docs Canadian International Documentary Festival, won the awards for Best Narrative Short and Best Canadian Animation at the 2020 Ottawa International Animation Festival, and won the award for Best Animated Short at the 2021 San Francisco International Film Festival.

The film was a Prix Iris nominee for Best Animated Short Film at the 23rd Quebec Cinema Awards.
