= In the Mirror (film) =

- Theatrical release poster
- Directed by: Laila Pakalniņa
- Screenplay by: Laila Pakalniņa
- Based on: "Snow White" by the Brothers Grimm
- Produced by: Laila Pakalniņa; Dagnė Vildžiūnaitė
- Starring: Madlēna Valdberga
- Cinematography: Gints Berzins
- Edited by: Ieva Veiveryte
- Music by: Pauļus Kilbausks; Vigints Kisevičs
- Production companies: Hargla Company; Just a Moment
- Release dates: November 22, 2020 (PÖFF); November 18, 2021 (Latvia)
- Running time: 84 minutes
- Countries: Latvia; Lithuania
- Language: Latvian

In the Mirror (Latvian: Spogulī) is a 2020 absurdist fantasy comedy film written, co-produced and directed by Laila Pakalniņa. It is a reinterpretation of the fairy tale Snow White by the Brothers Grimm. The cast is composed of Madlēna Valdberga, Lauris Dzelzītis, Elza Leimane, Gatis Gāga, Kaspars Gods and Mikolas Vildžiūnas.

== Synopsis ==
A CrossFit trainer becomes the father of a newborn baby girl named Snow White. Her mother dies, and her father soon marries a self-centered CrossFit athlete. She exercises constantly, striving to be the best she can be. In fact, she's also becoming the most agile, beautiful, and strongest: she can now do 50 burpees. Meanwhile, Snow White also grows in the realm of CrossFit, and as time goes on, she's poised to surpass her stepmother.

== Cast ==
- Madlēna Valdberga as Snow White
- Lauris Dzelzītis as Snow White's Father
- Elza Leimane as Snow White's Stepmother
- Gatis Gāga as Sailor
- Kaspars Gods
- Mikolas Vildžiūnas

== Release ==
In the Mirror had its world premiere on November 22, 2020, at the 24th Tallinn Black Nights Film Festival, then screened on October 10, 2021, at the 50th Festival du nouveau cinéma, on October 20, 2021, at the 8th Riga International Film Festival, and on October 29, 2021, at the Raindance Film Festival.

The film was originally scheduled for commercial release in Latvian theaters on November 5, 2021, but was delayed until November 18, 2021.

== Accolades ==
Year	Award / Festival	Category	Recipient	Result	Ref.
2020	24th Tallinn Black Nights Film Festival	Grand Prix for the Best Film	In the Mirror	Nominated	
2021	50th Festival du nouveau cinéma	International Competition - Grand Prize	In the Mirror	Nominated	
2021	8th Riga International Film Festival	Best Film	In the Mirror	Nominated	
2021	Raindance Film Festival	Best International Feature	In the Mirror	Nominated	
2021	Raindance Film Festival	Best Screenplay	Laila Pakalniņa	Nominated	
2022	Latvian National Film Festival	Best Film	In the Mirror	Nominated	
2022	Latvian National Film Festival	Best Director	Laila Pakalniņa	Won	
2022	Latvian National Film Festival	Best Actor	Lauris Dzelzītis	Nominated	
2022	Latvian National Film Festival	Best Actress	Madlēna Valdberga	Nominated	
2022	Latvian National Film Festival	Best Supporting Actress	Elza Leimane	Nominated	
2022	Latvian National Film Festival	Best Screenplay	Laila Pakalniņa	Nominated	
2022	Latvian National Film Festival	Best Cinematography	Gints Bērziņš	Nominated	
2022	Latvian National Film Festival	Best Editing	Ieva Veiverite	Won	
2022	Latvian National Film Festival	Best Production Design	Aldis Meinerts	Nominated	
2022	Latvian National Film Festival	Best Score	Pauļus Kilbausks, Vigints Kisevičs	Nominated	
