= Aivars Leimanis =

Latvian ballet dancer

- Born: 3 July 1958 (age 68); Riga, Latvia
- Occupations: Ballet dancer and artistic director
- Children: 2, including Elza Leimane

Aivars Leimanis (born 3 July 1958) is a Latvian ballet dancer and is now the Artistic Director of Latvia’s National Ballet. His daughter is the ballet dancer, Elza Leimane.

== Training and Career ==
From 1968-1976, he trained at the Riga School of Choreography. From 1978-1980, he taught at the Riga Choreography School. After graduating, Aivars Leimanis became a soloist in the Ballet Company of the Latvian National Opera. He has danced the leading roles in such ballets as the "Nutcracker", "Giselle" "Don Quixote", and "The Sleeping Beauty". From 1989-1993, he danced in the Star Group of Vladimir Vasilyev and Yekaterina Maksimova. In 1993, he retired from dancing and became the Artistic Director of the Latvian National Opera Ballet Company. From 1989-1995, he studied choreography at The Faculty of Ballet Masters of the Russian Academy of Theatre Arts, and in 1995 he obtained the degree of Master of Arts.

In 1998, he was elected as a Member of Riga City Council. From 1999-2001, he was the Chairman of the Committee of Culture, Art and Religion at the Riga City Council and Board Member of the Riga City Council. In 2003 he was awarded the Latvian Three-Star Order.

He has choreographed and staged the following ballets: Le Corsaire (Adam), Swan Lake, The Nutcracker, Francesca da Rimini, Sleeping Beauty (Tchaikovsky), The Life (Dvorak's Symphony No.9), Coppelia (Delibes), Atlantis (Janis Ivanovs), Concerto Grosso (Arturs Maskats), as well as ballet miniatures (Award of the Best Choreographer in Budapest '98); dances for Verdi's opera Aida and Zigmars Liepins' opera Rose and Blood; has represented Latvian art in more than 40 countries including the USA, France, China, Great Britain.
