= Heart String Marionette =

- Film poster
- Directed by: M dot Strange
- Music by: Endika; M dot Strange
- Release date: June 15, 2012
- Running time: 121 minutes
- Countries: USA; Iceland
- Language: English / Polish

Heart String Marionette is a 2012 independent animated film directed by M dot Strange. The film utilizes 3D computer graphics and was released digitally on June 15, 2012. It received its theatrical premiere at the Cinequest Film Festival on March 7, 2015.

== Plot ==
The film follows Samhaine Tsuke, a masked warrior who is enlisted by a boy trapped in a box to hunt down a clown who allegedly stole the boy's brother. Samhaine embarks on a quest through a surreal landscape populated by demons and monsters, accompanied by a woman named SiouXsie Silen and later joined by an archer named Tatsuya.

The narrative reveals that Samhaine is connected to a play called "The Silent Form" and that the events mirror those described in the theatrical work. As the story progresses, Samhaine confronts Lord Wor, revealed to be both his father and the clown from the original quest. The climax involves a journey to Hell, where Samhaine faces the Devil before ultimately defeating his father and breaking a cycle of abuse and corruption.

The director has stated that the narrative structure is influenced by Noh, a form of Japanese theater, prioritizing emotional impact over conventional plot progression.

== Production ==
The film features voice acting by Jimmy Urine, JP Anderson, Richard Grove, Asil Aceves, and Tanja Björk, among others. M dot Strange served as the primary creator, handling most aspects of production single-handedly.

Two versions of the film exist: the Original Cut, featuring music composed by Endika in collaboration with the director, and the Director's Cut, scored by M dot Strange himself. The Director's Cut includes additional scenes not present in the Original Cut while omitting some material from the original version.

== Technical aspects ==
The film was created primarily using Cinema 4D software, with over 1,500 shots rendered entirely within the program. After Effects was used for compositing work. The production utilized simplified character models, with most characters derived from the same basic figure. The complete production process took two and a half years.

A companion book titled A_Book was published, documenting the film's production process and providing guidance for independent animators and filmmakers.

== Release ==
Heart String Marionette was released digitally on June 15, 2012. The Original Cut received its theatrical screening at the Cinequest Film Festival on March 7, 2015.

== See also ==
- List of animated feature films
- List of computer-animated films
- We Are the Strange
