= The Noise of Engines =

2021 Canadian drama film

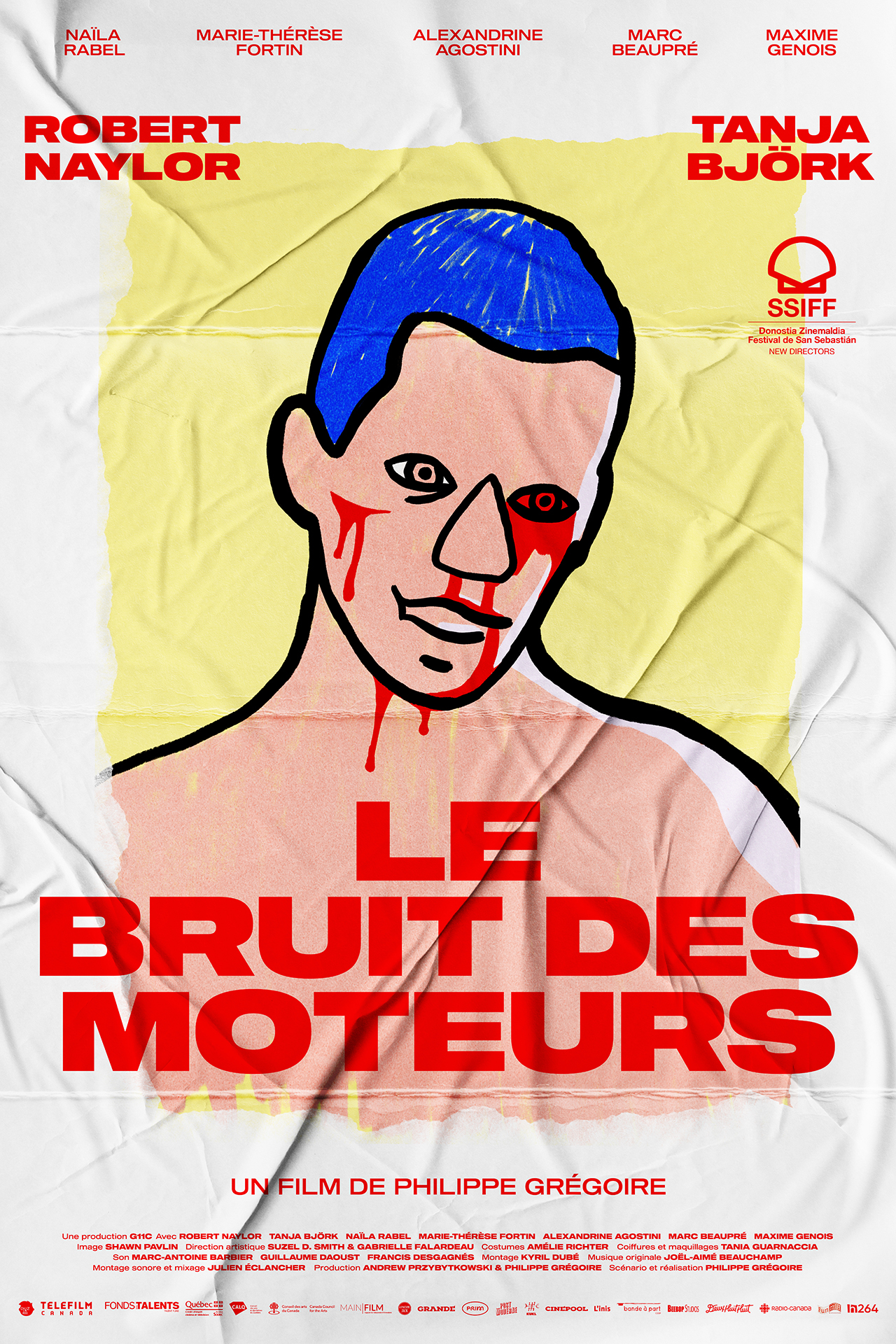
- Film poster
- French: Le bruit des moteurs
- Directed by: Philippe Grégoire
- Written by: Philippe Grégoire
- Produced by: Philippe Grégoire; Andrew Przybytkowski
- Starring: Robert Naylor; Tanja Björk
- Cinematography: Shawn Pavlin
- Edited by: Kyril Dubé
- Music by: Joël-Aimé Beauchamp
- Production company: G11C
- Release date: September 19, 2021 (SSIFF)
- Running time: 79 minutes
- Country: Canada
- Language: French

The Noise of Engines (French: Le bruit des moteurs) is a 2021 Canadian drama film, written, produced, and directed by Philippe Grégoire. The film stars Robert Naylor as Alexandre, a Canada Border Services Agency instructor who returns to his hometown after being suspended from work following an unverified sexual assault allegation, who befriends Icelandic drag racer Aðalbjörg (Tanja Björk) while under surveillance by the police because of a spate of pornographic graffiti in the town.

The cast also includes Alexandrine Agostini, Marc Beaupré, Arnmundur Ernst Björnsson, Huguette Chevalier, Patrice Dussault, Marie-Thérèse Fortin, Maxime Genois, Vial Grégoire, Ingi Hrafn Hilmarsson, Nadia Kessiby, Marc Larrivée, Gabrielle Lessard, Virginie Ouellet, Naïla Rabel and Charles Voyer.

The film was inspired in part by Grégoire's own background as a Canada Border Services Agency employee, and was shot primarily in Grégoire's hometown of Napierville, Quebec but also partly in Iceland.

The film premiered at the 69th San Sebastián International Film Festival on September 19, 2021. It had its Canadian premiere at the 2021 Festival du nouveau cinéma.

== Awards ==
Award	Date of ceremony	Category	Recipient(s)	Result	Ref(s)
Festival du nouveau cinéma	2021	Prix de la diffusion Québecor for Best Film by an Emerging Canadian Director	Philippe Grégoire	Won	
Directors Guild of Canada	2021	DGC Discovery Award	Philippe Grégoire	Nominated	
Canadian Screen Awards	2022	Best Director	Philippe Grégoire	Nominated	
Canadian Screen Awards	2022	Best Supporting Actress	Tanja Björk	Nominated	
Canadian Screen Awards	2022	John Dunning Best First Feature	Philippe Grégoire	Nominated	
