= Opening Up (film) =

2010 Canadian short film

- French: M'ouvrir
- Directed by: Albéric Aurtenèche
- Written by: Albéric Aurtenèche
- Produced by: Sylvain Corbeil; Nancy Grant
- Starring: Ariane Trépanier; Pierre-Luc Lafontaine; Denis Bernard
- Cinematography: Nicolas Canniccioni
- Edited by: Isabelle Malenfant
- Music by: Roger Tellier-Craig
- Production company: Metafilms
- Release date: October 2010
- Running time: 19 minutes
- Country: Canada
- Language: French

Opening Up (French: M'ouvrir) is a Canadian short drama film, directed by Albéric Aurtenèche and released in 2010. The film stars Ariane Trépanier as Gabrielle, a teenage girl who is prone to self-cutting her skin, and who feels understood for the first time when she is taken to the hospital and meets Étienne (Pierre-Luc Lafontaine), a boy her own age who is also there for an injury that may have been less accidental than it seems.

The cast also includes Denis Bernard, Catherine Cadotte, Daniel Gadouas, Mireille Métellus, Nicole Boissé, Sylvain Corbeil, Yan Courtemanche, Éléonore Lamothe and Renaud Lebel.

The film won the Jutra Award for Best Live Action Short Film at the 13th Jutra Awards in 2011.
