= Betty Youson Award for Best Canadian Short Documentary =

The Betty Youson Award for Best Canadian Short Documentary is a Canadian award, presented annually by the Hot Docs Canadian International Documentary Festival to honour a film judged as the best Canadian short documentary film in that year's festival program. The award comes with a $3,000 prize from festival sponsors John and Betty Youson.

The award was presented for the first time in 2018. Prior to that year, a single award for Best Short Documentary Film, inclusive of both Canadian and international films, was presented. Concurrently with the creation of the Betty Youson Award, a separate award for international short films was also created.

The jury have also usually given an honorable mention in addition to the overall winner.

== Winners ==
Year	Film	Filmmaker(s)	Ref
2018	Prince's Tale	Jamie Miller	
2018	Vika	Christian Borys, Marta Iwanek	
2019	Kora: A Circle Life	Tenzin Sedon	
2019	Mothers Of	Ross Lai	
2020	êmîcêtôcêt: Many Bloodlines	Theola Ross	
2020	In the Shadow of the Pines	Anne Koizumi	
2021	Ain't No Time for Women	Sarra El Abed	
2021	The Hairdresser	Lorraine Price	
2022	Perfecting the Art of Longing	Kitra Cahana	
2022	The Benevolents (Les Bienvaillants)	Sarah Baril Gaudet	
2023	Last Respects	Megan Durnford	
2024	Am I the Skinniest Person You’ve Ever Seen?	Eisha Marjara	
2024	The Sparkle (L'Artifice)	Isabelle Grignon-Francke	
2025	Delta Dawn	Asia Youngman	
2026	My Body Goes to Work	Fernanda Molina	
