= Elza Leimane =

Latvian ballet dancer (born 1984)

Elza Leimane- Martinova
- Born: 2 July 1984 (age 40); Rīga, Latvian SSR
- Occupation: Ballet dancer
- Partner: Raimonds Martinovs
- Parent: Aivars Leimanis

Elza Leimane (born 2 July 1984) is a Latvian ballet dancer.

== Biography ==
She graduated from the Riga Choreography School in 2001 and has been a member of the Latvian National Ballet Company since her graduation. She has been a principal dancer with the company since 2004. Leimane has had additional ballet training from the Paris Conservatoire (1999), Anaheim Ballet summer courses, USA (1999), International Batrolin Ballet seminar (2002 and 2003), Vienna Conservatory summer courses (2000), the St Petersburg Ballet Company, Maryinsky Theatre and Hamburg Ballet. She was a member of the European Youth Ballet in 2000, 2001 and 2004.

Leimane comes from a very talented family, her grandmother is the Latvian actress Baiba Indriksone, who at the age of 75 is still performing at the National Theatre. Her grandfather was a film director and her parents were both dancers at the Latvian National Ballet. For over ten years, her father Aivars Leimanis has been the artistic director of Latvia's National Ballet.

She has danced a wide variety of roles such as Kitri in Don Quixote, the title role in Giselle, Juliet in Romeo and Juliet, Gulnara in Le Corsaire, Marquise de Mereuil in Les Liaisons Dangereuses and Katarina in Taming of the Shrew.

She has toured extensively in Norway, Germany, France, Russia, Finland, England, Italy, Croatia, Israel, Portugal and Spain. She has been involved in the multimedia charity project, Underwater Photo Ballet and was a model for Kondrašins Personal Calendar in 2007.

In 2020, she played Snow White's stepmother in the fantasy comedy film In the Mirror.

== Awards ==
Leimane has been the recipient of numerous awards including the Latvian Culture Ministry Award (1998, 1999), the Aldaris Prize 'Dancer of the year 2005' and the Theatre Prize 'Best Dancer in principal roles 2007'. She has also participated in the following international competitions:

- Rudolf Nureyev International Ballet Competition (Budapest, 1998) - Best Young Dancer Prize and Djagilev Special Prize
- International Ballet Competition (Yalta, Ukraine, 1998) - bronze medal
- Vienna International Ballet Competition (1999) - 1st prize
- Eurovision Young Dancers (France, 1999) - finalist
- New York International Ballet Competition (2005) - finalist
- South African International Ballet Competition (2008) - silver medal

== Personal life ==
Leimane's dancing partner and partner has been Raimonds Martinovs, a fellow Latvian dancer.
