= La Contemplation du mystère =

- Directed by: Albéric Aurtenèche
- Written by: Albéric Aurtenèche
- Produced by: Sylvain Corbeil
- Starring: Emmanuel Schwartz; Gilles Renaud; Martin Dubreuil; François Papineau
- Cinematography: Ian Lagarde
- Edited by: Élisabeth Olga Tremblay
- Music by: Roger Tellier-Craig
- Production company: Metafilms
- Distributed by: Films sans frontières
- Release date: October 15, 2021 (FNC)
- Running time: 100 minutes
- Country: Canada
- Language: French

La Contemplation du mystère is a Canadian drama film, directed by Albéric Aurtenèche and released in 2021. The film stars Emmanuel Schwartz as Éloi, a man who is returning to his small hometown in Quebec to partake in a group ritual commemorating his father's death in a hunting accident a year earlier, only to end up using psychedelic drugs such as DMT and ayahuasca in his quest to understand the event's meaning in his life.

The film's cast also includes Gilles Renaud, Martin Dubreuil, François Papineau and Sarah-Jeanne Labrosse.

Production on the film started in October 2019. The film was originally slated to premiere at the 2020 Festival du nouveau cinéma, but was cancelled when the festival shifted from in-person to online screening due to the COVID-19 pandemic in Quebec, and instead premiered at the 2021 festival on October 15, 2021. It opened commercially on October 22.

The film was a nominee for the DGC Discovery Award at the 2020 Directors Guild of Canada awards.
