= Tanja Björk =

Icelandic actress

Tanja Björk Ómarsdóttir is an Icelandic actress. She is most noted for her performance as Aðalbjörg in the 2021 film The Noise of Engines (Le Bruit des moteurs), for which she received a Canadian Screen Award nomination for Best Supporting Actress at the 10th Canadian Screen Awards in 2022.

Her prior roles have included the films Heart String Marionette, XL and Reykjavik.
