= Marie Valade =

Marie Valade is a Canadian animator from Quebec, most noted for her 2021 short film Boobs (Lolos).

The film was the winner of the National Dada Prize at the 2021 Festival du nouveau cinéma, and was named to TIFF's annual year-end Canada's Top Ten list for 2021. It received a Canadian Screen Award nomination for Best Animated Short at the 10th Canadian Screen Awards, and a Prix Iris nomination for Best Animated Short Film at the 24th Quebec Cinema Awards.

She also previously directed the animated short film Interoculus, and has had animation credits on short films by other filmmakers.
