= Lolos (film) =

2021 Canadian short film

- Film poster
- French: Lolos
- Directed by: Marie Valade
- Written by: Marie Valade
- Produced by: Marie Valade
- Edited by: Paul Tom; Marie Valade
- Music by: Sasha Ratcliffe
- Animation by: Marie Valade; Vincent Éthier; Cielle Graham; Bogdan Anifrani; Mathieu Girard; Éléonore Mantelle
- Distributed by: La Distributrice de films
- Release date: June 14, 2021 (Annecy)
- Running time: 8 minutes
- Country: Canada

Lolos (English: Boobs) is a Canadian animated short film, directed by Marie Valade and released in 2021. The film portrays a woman's complicated love-hate relationship with her own body, particularly but not exclusively her breasts.

The film premiered in June 2021 at the Annecy International Animation Film Festival, and had its Canadian premiere at the 2021 Toronto International Film Festival.

The film was the winner of the National Dada Prize at the 2021 Festival du nouveau cinéma, and was named to TIFF's annual year-end Canada's Top Ten list for 2021. It received a Canadian Screen Award nomination for Best Animated Short at the 10th Canadian Screen Awards, and a Prix Iris nomination for Best Animated Short Film at the 24th Quebec Cinema Awards.
