= The Sparkle =

2023 Canadian documentary film

- French: L'Artifice
- Directed by: Isabelle Grignon-Francke
- Written by: Isabelle Grignon-Francke
- Produced by: Patrick Francke-Sirois
- Cinematography: Émile Desroches-Larouche
- Edited by: Anouk Deschênes
- Music by: Émilou Johnson
- Production company: Club Vidéo
- Distributed by: Welcome Aboard
- Release date: November 24, 2023 (RIDM)
- Running time: 17 minutes
- Country: Canada
- Language: French

The Sparkle (French: L'Artifice) is a Canadian short documentary film, directed by Isabelle Grignon-Francke and released in 2023. The film centres on Kim Lalonde, a man who is working for a travelling summer carnival but torn as to whether to quit in order to pursue his personal passion for geology after Billy, his closest friend among his colleagues, is laid off.

The film premiered at the 2023 Montreal International Documentary Festival.

== Awards ==
Award	Date of ceremony	Category	Recipient(s)	Result	Ref.
Hot Docs Canadian International Documentary Festival	2024	Betty Youson Award for Best Canadian Short Documentary	Isabelle Grignon-Francke	Honoured	
International Documentary Association	2024	Best Short Documentary	Isabelle Grignon-Francke	Nominated	
Prix Iris	December 8, 2024	Best Short Documentary	Isabelle Grignon-Francke, Patrick Francke-Sirois	Nominated	
