= Philippe Grégoire =

Canadian film director and screenwriter

Philippe Grégoire is a Canadian film director and screenwriter from Napierville, Quebec, whose debut feature film The Noise of Engines (Le Bruit des moteurs) was released in 2021.

The film received three Canadian Screen Award nominations at the 10th Canadian Screen Awards in 2022, including a Best Director nod for Grégoire and the John Dunning Best First Feature Award.

Prior to The Noise of Engines, Grégoire directed the short films Beep Beep (2011), Aquarium (2013) and One Man (2016).
