= Uldus Bakhtiozina =

Russian artist

- Born: Bakhtiozina Uldus Vildanovna; Leningrad, Soviet Union
- Education: University of the Arts London
- Known for: Painting, photography, art, design
- Movement: Visual arts

Uldus Vildanovna Bakhtiozina (Russian: Юлдус Вильдановна Бахтиозина) is a Russian artist, film director, and photographer.

== Early life and education ==
A third-generation native St. Petersburg, she is of mixed ancestry: her mother is of mixed Ukrainian-Polish-Jewish descent and her father is a Tatar.

She gained her first degree in politics in Russia at West-North Academy of public administration. She left Russia at 21 years old, moving to London. She studied at University of the Arts London, Central Saint Martins and London College of Communications.

== Career ==
In 2014 Uldus became the first Russian speaker at a TED conference, giving a talk in Vancouver, British Columbia, Canada about her photo project Desperate Romantics. She gave her second TED talk in 2017.

Uldus also spoke at Conference CDI conference in Mexico, as a finalist of Gifted Citizen Prize.

In October 2014 Uldus was named one of the strongest women of the year, according to the BBC, and took part in BBC debates and TV program 100 women,.

Uldus was awarded as a winner in May 2015 in TOP-50 Most Famous People of Saint-Petersburg by sobaka.ru as an artist. In 2021 Uldus was awarded as a film director.

Uldus is the author and photographer of serial of photos for the movie "He is dragon" poster (original "Он-дракон".)

In the 2019/20 Season, Uldus made her debut at Royal Opera House as a costume and make-up designer and style supervisor for Aisha and Abhaya, a co-production between The Royal Ballet and Rambert.

In 2020 she completed her feature film debut Tzarevna Scaling (original "Дочь рыбака") In 2021 it was selected for the Berlinale at Berlinale Forum section.

== Exhibitions ==
- Best of Russia 2011, awarded in "Style" category, group exhibition, Vinzavod, Moscow
- Self universe, Gaze Gallery, Berlin, Germany, May 2013
- Desperate Romantics, Anna Nova Gallery, Saint-Petersburg, Russia, September 2013
- Mysterious Russian soul, part of Vogue Italia + Leica Exhibitions, announced in April 2015
- Russ Land Anna Nova Gallery, Saint-Petersburg, Russia, May–August 2015
- The Artist Knight, group exhibition, Kasteel van gaasbeek, Brussels, Belgium, July 2017
- Conjured life, Anna Nova Gallery, Saint-Petersburg, Russia, May–June 2017
- Circus 17, Anna Nova Gallery, Saint-Petersburg, Russia, November 2017
- The Artist Knight, group exhibition with Marina Abramović, Jan Fabre, Damien Hirst at Gaasbeek Castle, July 2017
- Film screening exhibition, Multimedia Art Museum, Moscow, November 2017
- Miss Future, the exhibition at Seen gallery, Brussels, Belgium August 2019
- Русская Сказка. От Васнецова До Сих Пор, the exhibition at Tretyakov Gallery, Moscow
- Raindance Review on Tzarevna Scaling https://raindance.org/festival-programme/tzarevna-scaling/
- Художник Мариинского Театра https://www.mariinsky.ru/company/costume_designers/bakhtiozina/
- InStyle Interview https://instyle.ru/lifestyle/culture/intervyu-yuldus-bakhtiozinoy/
- Царевны International: «Дочъ Рыбака» – Кокошный Филъм О Постсоветской Женственности https://kinoart.ru/reviews/tsarevny-international-doch-rybaka-kokoshnyy-film-o-postsovetskoy-zhenstvennosti
- Юлдус Бахтиозина стала художницей по костюмам трех сочинений Стравинского в Мариинском театре https://topspb.tv/news/2021/08/9/hudozhnik-po-kostyumam-mariinskogo-teatra-debyutirovala-kak-rezhisser-kino/
- Calvert Journal https://www.calvertjournal.com/features/show/12657/tzarevna-scaling-uldus-bakhtiozina-berlinale-2020-russian-folk-film-coming-of-age
