= Ain't No Time for Women =

2021 Canadian short documentary film

- French: Y'a pas d'heure pour les femmes
- Directed by: Sarra El Abed
- Written by: Sarra El Abed
- Produced by: Maud Christiane; Isabelle Grignon-Francke
- Cinematography: Catherine Lefebvre
- Edited by: Jordan Choinière
- Production company: Travelling Distribution
- Release date: February 6, 2021 (Clermont-Ferrand)
- Running time: 19 minutes
- Country: Canada
- Languages: Arabic; French

Ain't No Time for Women (French: Y'a pas d'heure pour les femmes) is a 2021 Canadian short documentary film, directed by Sarra El Abed. The film centres on a group of women in a hair salon in Tunis, and their reactions to the 2019 Tunisian presidential election.

The film premiered at the 2021 Clermont-Ferrand International Short Film Festival. It had its Canadian premiere at the 2021 Hot Docs Canadian International Documentary Festival, where it won the Betty Youson Award for Best Canadian Short Documentary, and it was the winner of the Short Documentary Award at the 2021 DOXA Documentary Film Festival.

The film was named to TIFF's annual year-end Canada's Top Ten list for 2021.
