= Perfecting the Art of Longing =

2021 Canadian short documentary film

- Directed by: Kitra Cahana
- Written by: Kitra Cahana
- Produced by: Kat Baulu; Ariel Nasr
- Starring: Rabbi Ronnie Cahana
- Cinematography: Kitra Cahana
- Edited by: Kara Blake
- Music by: Olivier Alary
- Production company: National Film Board of Canada
- Release date: October 8, 2021 (FNC)
- Running time: 12 minutes
- Country: Canada
- Language: English

Perfecting the Art of Longing is a Canadian short documentary film, directed by Kitra Cahana and released in 2021. The film is a portrait of Cahana's father Ronnie, a former rabbi who has been living in long-term care since suffering a stroke which left him quadriplegic and unable to speak, and the family's efforts to stay connected to him remotely during the COVID-19 pandemic in Canada.

The film premiered in October 2021 at the Festival du nouveau cinéma.

The film won the Betty Youson Award for Best Canadian Short Documentary at the 2022 Hot Docs Canadian International Documentary Festival, and the Prix Iris for Best Short Documentary at the 24th Quebec Cinema Awards in 2022. It was released as a New York Times Op-Doc.

The film received a Canadian Screen Award nomination for Best Short Documentary at the 11th Canadian Screen Awards in 2023.
