= Kitra Cahana =

American-Canadian photojournalist

- Born: 1987 (age 38–39)
- Education: McGill University
- Occupations: Photojournalist, Documentary Filmmaker
- Awards: Peabody Award, World Press Photo Award, Dupont Columbia Award

Kitra Cahana is an American-Canadian photojournalist, documentary filmmaker, and TED speaker. She has received numerous awards for her work, including a Peabody Award, the World Press Photo, a TED Senior Fellowship, a Dupont Columbia Award and a Pulitzer Center for Investigative Reporting grant. Her photographs and films have been featured in The New York Times, National Geographic Magazine, and ProPublica.

Cahana's body of work revolves around the intersection of human rights, social justice, and identity. She has dedicated her career to documenting the experiences of refugees, nomads, and individuals living with disabilities. Critics have praised her work for its sensitivity, compassion, and exceptional visual acuity.

In 2020, Cahana embarked on a project to document the personal experience of her father, Rabbi Ronnie Cahana, who was residing in a long-term care facility during the COVID-19 pandemic. This endeavor resulted in the short documentary film Perfecting the Art of Longing, which explores the themes of isolation, family, care-giving and resilience among individuals in long-term care facilities amidst the pandemic. The film won the Betty Youson Award for Best Canadian Short Documentary at the 2022 Hot Docs Canadian International Documentary Festival, and the Prix Iris for Best Short Documentary at the 24th Quebec Cinema Awards in 2022. It was released as a New York Times Op-Doc. In 2023, the film received a Canadian Screen Award nomination for Best Short Documentary at the 11th Canadian Screen Awards.

Cahana is also the granddaughter of famed Holocaust survivor and artist Alice Lok Cahana.
