= Albéric Aurtenèche =

Canadian film director

Albéric Aurtenèche is a Canadian film director. He is most noted for his short film Opening Up (M'ouvrir), which won the Jutra Award for Best Live Action Short Film at the 13th Jutra Awards in 2011.

Born in Paris, France and raised in Montreal, Quebec, he studied film at Concordia University.

His debut feature film, La Contemplation du mystère, entered production in 2019, and was longlisted for the Directors Guild of Canada's DGC Discovery Award in 2020.

== Filmography ==
- Non-lieu - 2006
- L'appel du vide - 2008
- Opening Up (M'ouvrir) - 2010
- Sigismond sans images - 2016
- May Your Dominion Expand (Que votre empire s'étende) - 2019
- La Contemplation du mystère - 2021
