= Some Like It Rare =

- French: Barbaque
- Directed by: Fabrice Éboué
- Written by: Fabrice Éboué; Vincent Solignac
- Produced by: Julien Deris; David Gauquié; Jean-Luc Ormières
- Starring: Marina Foïs; Fabrice Éboué
- Cinematography: Thomas Brémond
- Edited by: Alice Plantin
- Music by: Guillaume Roussel
- Production company: Cinéfrance
- Distributed by: Apollo Films
- Release dates: 8 September 2021 (L'Étrange Festival); 27 October 2021 (France)
- Running time: 79 minutes
- Country: France
- Language: French

Some Like It Rare (French: Barbaque) is a 2021 French comedy horror film directed by Fabrice Éboué, starring Marina Foïs and Éboué. The film depicts a struggling butcher shop run by a married couple who begin hunting humans who practice veganism and selling their meat, labeling it as "pork".

== Cast ==
- Marina Foïs as Sophie Pascal
- Fabrice Éboué as Vincent Pascal
- Jean-François Cayrey as Marc Brachard
- Virginie Hocq as Stéphanie Brachard
- Lisa Do Couto Teixeira as Chloé Pascal
- Victor Meutelet as Lucas
- Stéphane Soo Mongo as Gendarme Ntamack
- Nicolas Lumbreras as Joshua
- Alexia Chardard as Héméra
- Franck Migeon as Camille
- Colette Sodoyez as Madame Coignard
- Ted Etienne as Stéphane
- Roby Schinasi as Alexandre
- Tom Pezier as Winnie

== Reception ==
Martin Unsworth of Starburst rated the film 4 stars out of 5 and wrote that it is a "sumptuous exercise in bad taste" and that that "works to its advantage". Matt Glasby of RadioTimes rated the film 4 stars out of 5 and called it "deeply, deliciously funny".

Paul Lê of Bloody Disgusting rated the film 3.5 skulls out of 5 and wrote that it will "undoubtedly satisfy a craving for something dark and weird without ever feeling too heavy." Film critic Anton Bitel, writing for VODzilla.co rated the film 3.5 stars out of 5 and called it "slyly funny" and "mildly shocking".

Cath Clarke of The Guardian rated the film 3 stars out of 5 and called it "lightweight" and "gruesomely hilarious in places". Mae Abdulbaki of Screen Rant gave the film a "Good" rating of 3 stars out of 5 and wrote that while the film "does wear off after a while" and that its commentary "could have been a lot more biting", it is "entertaining".
