= Stéphane Demers =

Canadian actor

- Born: 13 November 1966 (age 59); Montreal, Quebec, Canada
- Occupation: Actor
- Years active: 1990–present

Stéphane Demers (born 1966) is a Canadian actor best known for having portrayed Canadian prime minister Pierre Trudeau in the television mini-series Trudeau II: Maverick in the Making. He also appeared in the television series Trauma, Sophie and Les Hauts et les bas de Sophie Paquin, and in the films The Left-Hand Side of the Fridge (La Moitié gauche du frigo), The Orphan Muses (Les Muses orphelines) and Maman Last Call.

Demers was born in Montreal, Quebec.

== Recognition ==
- 2000 Gémeaux Award for Best Supporting Actor - Series or Dramatic Program - Fortier (episode 1.9) - Nominated

== Filmography ==
Year	Film	Role	Other notes
1988	Londeleau		(Short)
1991	Love Me (Love-moi)	La Piquette	
1996	Cosmos	Gilles Ouellette	
1997	Paysage no 1		
1998	Chance or Coincidence	L'accidenté	
2000	The Orphan Muses	Luc Tanguay	
2000	The Left-Hand Side of the Fridge	Stéphane	first full-length feature film by Canadian film director Philippe Falardeau
2001	The Pig's Law (La loi du cochon)	Adrien Massé	
2004	The Aviator	Maitre d'	
2004	Happy Campers (Camping sauvage)	Jean-Marc Roberge	
2005	Audition	Robert	
2005	The Novena	Mari de Lise	
2005	La dernière incarnation	Louis-Philippe	
2005	Corps et âmes	Paul	(Short)
2005	Maman Last Call	James Beaulieu	
2006	Mirrors (Miroirs d'été)	Hervé	(Short)
2007	The Ring (Le Ring)	Claude Blais	
2007	Surviving My Mother (Comment survivre à sa mère)	Student's Café Customer	aka Comment survivre à sa mère
2007	La lâcheté	Inspecteur Savard	
2010	Trader Games	Antoine	
2011	Boys on Film 7: Bad Romance	Hervé	(segment "Mirrors")
2011	Monsieur Lazhar	Father of Marie-Frédérique (Père de)	
2011	Switch	Inspecteur Lachaux	
2012	Imaginaerum	Twisted Tin Soldier	Film was developed with and features music from Finnish symphonic metal band Nightwish
2012	Mars and April (Mars et Avril)	Bernard Brel	
2014	Maisons modèles	Le Client Dsespr	(Short)
2014	Corbo	Professeur Lacasse	
2023	We Are Zombies	Otto Maddox	
Year	Television series	Role	Other notes
1990	Cormoran		TV series, 1 episode
1990	Chambres en ville	Denis Lapierre	TV series, 3 episodes
1994	Avec un grand A		TV series, 1 episode
1995	10-07: L'affaire Zeus		TV series, 1 episode
1996	Omerta, la loi du silence		TV series, 5 episodes
1997	Omertà II - La loi du silence	Marc Larose	TV mini-series, 6 episodes
1997	L'enfant des Appalaches	Ange	(TV movie)
1997	Le masque	Patrice Larouche	TV series, 4 episodes
1998	Réseaux	Pierre Couture #2	TV series, 1 episode
1999	Les siamoises		(TV movie)
2000	The Secret Adventures of Jules Verne	Duplessis	TV series, 1 episode
2000-2003	Chartrand et Simonne	Pierre-Elliott Trudeau	TV series, 5 episodes
2001	Fortier	Pierre Gagnon	TV series, 2 episodes
2001	Si la tendance se maintient	Régisseur de nouvelles	TV series, 4 episodes
2001	Tribu.com	Roc Vandal	TV series, 1 episode
2003	Robinson Crusoë	Lieutenant Black Prince	(TV movie)
2003	Les aventures tumultueuses de Jack Carter	Charles Dumas	TV series, 2 episodes
2004	Temps dur	Jean-Paul Dallaire	TV series, 10 episodes
2005	Cover-Girl	David	TV series, 3 episodes
2005	Trudeau II: Maverick in the Making	Pierre Elliot Trudeau 1949 to 1968	(TV movie)
2005	Miss Météo	James Beaulieu	(TV movie)
2005	Vice caché		TV series, 1 episode
2006	Live Once, Die Twice	Adrien Gillette	(TV movie)
2006-2008	Les hauts et les bas de Sophie Paquin	Bernard Painchaud	TV series, 8 episodes
2008	Mistaken	Detective Denis	(TV movie)
2008-2009	Sophie	Bernard	TV series, 14 episodes
2009	The Last Templar	Knights Templar Martin	TV mini-series, 2 episodes
2009	The Phantom	Stephan McDowell	TV mini-series, 2 episodes
2010-2012	Trauma	Dr. Julien Léveillée	TV series, 16 episodes
2013	Tactik	Jean-Hugues Bresson	TV series, 1 episode
2016	Mensonges	Richard Legault	TV series, 1 episode
2017	O'	Charles O'Hara	TV series, 2 episodes
2017-2019	District 31	Louis Bourgoin	TV series, 25 episodes
2024	Indéfendable	Daniel Raynaud	TV series
