= Alexis Martin (musician) =

Canadian musician and composer

- Years active: 2000s–present

Alexis Martin (born November 10, 1981) is a Canadian musician and composer, most noted as a frequent collaborator with Viviane Audet and Robin-Joël Cool on film and television scores.

He has previously been a percussionist for artists such as Robert Charlebois, Daniel Bélanger, Jorane, Harry Manx and Damien Robitaille, and is a partner with François Richard in Studio Le Hublot.

== Filmography ==
- My Daughter Is Not for Sale (Ma fille n'est pas à vendre) - 2017
- Cross My Heart (Les Rois mongols) - 2017
- Shadow Men (Nos hommes dans l'ouest) - 2017
- A Moon of Nickel and Ice (Sur la lune de nickel) - 2017
- Lovebirds (L'amour à la plage) - 2018
- 50/50 - 2018
- Polytechnique: Ce qu'il reste du 6 décembre - 2019
- Passage - 2020
- The Paper Man (Lafortune en papier) - 2020
- The Benevolents (Les Bienvaillants) - 2022
- Virage: double faute - 2023
- Death to the Bikini! (À mort le bikini!) - 2023
- Family Game (Arseneault et fils) - 2022
- Tell Me Why These Things Are So Beautiful (Dis-moi pourquoi ces choses sont si belles) - 2023
- Blue Sky Jo (La petite et le vieux) - 2024
- Haunted (Hantée) - 2026

== Awards ==
Award	Year	Category	Work	Result	Ref(s)
Canadian Screen Awards	2018	Best Original Score	Cross My Heart (Les Rois mongols) with Viviane Audet, Robin-Joël Cool	Nominated	
Prix Iris	2023	Best Original Music	Family Game (Arseneault et fils) with Viviane Audet, Robin-Joël Cool	Nominated	
Prix Iris	2024	Best Original Music	Tell Me Why These Things Are So Beautiful (Dis-moi pourquoi ces choses sont si belles) with Viviane Audet, Robin-Joël Cool	Nominated	
Prix Félix	2020	Instrumental Album of the Year	Conséquences (Bande originale de la série) with Viviane Audet, Robin-Joël Cool	Nominated	
