= Steve Laplante =

Canadian actor and writer

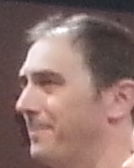
Image of Steve Laplante

Steve Laplante (born July 13, 1972) is a Canadian actor and writer from Quebec. He is most noted for his performance as David in the 2022 film Viking, for which he received a Canadian Screen Award nomination for Best Lead Performance in a Film at the 11th Canadian Screen Awards, and won the Prix Iris for Best Actor at the 25th Quebec Cinema Awards.

In addition to his Prix Iris nod for Viking, he was also nominated for Best Supporting Actor in the same year for Babysitter.

Originally from Drummondville, Quebec, he is a 1996 graduate of the National Theatre School of Canada. He first became widely known for his performance in a stage production of Wajdi Mouawad's play Tideline (Littoral), also later repeating the role in its 2004 film adaptation.

In addition to his acting he has written a number of stage plays, the most noted of which, Le Long de la principale, was a shortlisted nominee for the Governor General's Award for French-language drama at the 2007 Governor General's Awards. The play has also been staged in English as Down the Main Drag.

== Filmography ==
=== Film ===
| Year | Title | Role | Notes |
|---|---|---|---|
| 2002 | Family Jewel (Bijou de famille) | | |
| 2003 | Ma voisine danse le ska | Leica's father | |
| 2004 | Tideline (Littoral) | Wahab | |
| 2006 | Transparence | Martin | |
| 2006 | Cheech | Jean-Marc Blanchette | |
| 2008 | The Broken Line (La ligne brisée) | Jello | |
| 2008 | Avant-goût de printemps | Félix | |
| 2008 | The Deserter (Le Déserteur) | Alphonse Lortie | |
| 2012 | Wintergreen (Paparmane) | Jerome | |
| 2015 | The Good Feelings | Pierre | |
| 2016 | A Done Deal (Une formalité) | Remy | |
| 2018 | March Fool (Poisson de mars) | | |
| 2019 | We Are Gold (Nous sommes Gold) | | |
| 2019 | And the Birds Rained Down (Il pleuvait des oiseaux) | Police officer | |
| 2021 | Like the Ones I Used to Know (Les grandes claques) | Denis | |
| 2021 | See You Garbage! (Au plaisir les ordures!) | Prime Minister | |
| 2022 | Babysitter | Jean-Michel | |
| 2022 | Viking | David | |
| 2022 | The Cheaters (Les Tricheurs) | André | |
| 2023 | The Nature of Love (Simple comme Sylvain) | Philippe | |
| 2023 | Humanist Vampire Seeking Consenting Suicidal Person (Vampire humaniste cherche suicidaire consentant) | Aurélien | |
| 2023 | Coco Farm (Coco ferme) | Joseph-Armand Bombardier | |
| 2024 | Sisters and Neighbors! (Nos belles-sœurs) | | |

=== Television ===
| Year | Title | Role | Notes |
|---|---|---|---|
| 1997 | Ces enfants d'ailleurs | Martin | |
| 2003 | Ramdam | Tommy Bleau | |
| 2007 | Les Hauts et les bas de Sophie Paquin | Guillaume Payer | |
| 2009 | Aveux | Luc Desharnais | |
| 2010–2011 | Mirador | Alexandre Dalphond | |
| 2011 | Le Gentleman | Alain Thibodeau | |
| 2012 | Lance et compte | William Jasmin | |
| 2012 | Tu m'aimes-tu ? | David Lamontagne | |
| 2013 | La Vie parfaite | Éric Pedneault | |
| 2014 | 30 vies | André Masson | |
| 2017 | Terreur 404 | Sylvain | |
| 2017 | Olivier | Georges Dubreuil | |
| 2018 | Léo | Chabot | |
| 2020 | Faits divers | Denis Fontaine | |
| 2022 | Happily Married (C'est comme ça que je t'aime) | Gaëtan 2 | |
| 2024 | Temps de chien | Pascal | |
