= Carla Turcotte =

Canadian actress

Carla Turcotte (born 1992) is a Canadian actress. She is most noted for her performance in the film Sashinka, for which she received a Canadian Screen Award nomination for Best Actress at the 7th Canadian Screen Awards and a Prix Iris nomination for Best Actress at the 21st Quebec Cinema Awards.

Originally from Dégelis, Quebec, she got her start as a teenager acting in the locally-produced films of Rafaël Ouellet, most notably appearing as herself in the documentary-drama hybrid Finissant(e)s.

She has also appeared in the television series District 31, Vertige, Unité 9, Les invisibles, Portrait-Robot, Mégantic, Aller Simple (2022) and Classé secret (2023), and the films Nelly and Flashwood.
