= Prix Iris for Best Original Music =

Canadian film award

The Prix Iris for Best Original Music (French: Prix Iris de la meilleure musique originale) is an annual film award, presented by Québec Cinéma as part of its Prix Iris awards program, to honour the year's best music in films made within the Cinema of Quebec. Unlike some other film awards, which present separate categories for scores and songs, the Prix Iris only presents a single music category inclusive of both types of film music.

Until 2016, it was known as the Jutra Award for Best Original Music in memory of influential Quebec film director Claude Jutra. Following the withdrawal of Jutra's name from the award, the 2016 award was presented under the name Québec Cinéma. The Prix Iris name was announced in October 2016.

The most nominated composers are Benoît Charest, Michel Corriveau, Michel Cusson and Martin Léon, each receiving six nominations. Martin Léon and Daniel Bélanger are the most awarded composers, receiving three awards each. Dédé Fortin, who died in 2000, received the award posthumously for Through the Mist (Dédé, à tarvers les brumes), a biopic about his life and music with the band Les Colocs.

== 1990s ==
Year	Nominee(s)	Film	Ref
1999; 1st Jutra Awards
1999; 1st Jutra Awards	John Corigliano	The Red Violin (Le Violon rouge)	
1999; 1st Jutra Awards	Pierre Desrochers, Nathalie Boileau	August 32nd on Earth (Un 32 août sur terre)	
1999; 1st Jutra Awards	François Dompierre	It's Your Turn, Laura Cadieux (C't'à ton tour, Laura Cadieux)	
1999; 1st Jutra Awards	Richard Grégoire, Y. Desrosiers	Streetheart (Le Cœur au poing)	

== 2000s ==
Year	Nominee(s)	Film	Ref
2000; 2nd Jutra Awards
2000; 2nd Jutra Awards	Benoît Jutras	Alegria	
2000; 2nd Jutra Awards	Guy Bélanger, Steve Hill	Post Mortem	
2000; 2nd Jutra Awards	Gaëtan Gravel, Serge LaForest	The Big Snake of the World (Le Grand Serpent du monde)	
2000; 2nd Jutra Awards	Richard Grégoire	Memories Unlocked (Souvenirs intimes)	
2001; 3rd Jutra Awards
2001; 3rd Jutra Awards	Michel Donato, James Gelfand	The Orphan Muses (Les Muses orphelines)	
2001; 3rd Jutra Awards	Ned Bouhalassa, François Bruneau, Jean-Marc Pisapia	Pandora's Beauty (La Beauté de Pandore)	
2001; 3rd Jutra Awards	Gilles Grégoire	Hochelaga	
2001; 3rd Jutra Awards	Robert Marcel Lepage	Full Blast	
2002; 4th Jutra Awards
2002; 4th Jutra Awards	Guy Pelletier, Ramachandra Borcar	Soft Shell Man (Un crabe dans la tête)	
2002; 4th Jutra Awards	Bertrand Chénier	Tar Angel (L'Ange de goudron)	
2002; 4th Jutra Awards	Jean St-Jacques	February 15, 1839 (15 février 1839)	
2002; 4th Jutra Awards	Simon Wayland, Peter Xirogiannis, Phil York	Danny in the Sky	
2003; 5th Jutra Awards
2003; 5th Jutra Awards	Michel Cusson	Séraphin: Heart of Stone (Séraphin: un homme et son péché)	
2003; 5th Jutra Awards	Pierre Desrochers, Nathalie Boileau	Québec-Montréal	
2003; 5th Jutra Awards	Gilles Grégoire	Inside (Histoire de pen)	
2003; 5th Jutra Awards	Robert Marcel Lepage	Yellowknife	
2004; 6th Jutra Awards
2004; 6th Jutra Awards	Guy Bélanger, Claude Fradette	Gaz Bar Blues	
2004; 6th Jutra Awards	Jean-Marie Benoît	Seducing Doctor Lewis (La Grande séduction)	
2004; 6th Jutra Awards	Michel Cusson	Father and Sons (Père et fils)	
2004; 6th Jutra Awards	FM Le Sieur	Mambo Italiano	
2005; 7th Jutra Awards
2005; 7th Jutra Awards	Carl Bastien, Dumas	Love and Magnets (Les Aimants)	
2005; 7th Jutra Awards	Michel Corriveau	The Last Tunnel (Le Dernier tunnel)	
2005; 7th Jutra Awards	Michel Cusson	Dans une galaxie près de chez vous	
2005; 7th Jutra Awards	James Gelfand	Jack Paradise: Montreal by Night (Jack Paradise, Les nuits de Montréal)	
2006; 8th Jutra Awards
2006; 8th Jutra Awards	Daniel Bélanger	Audition (L'Audition)	
2006; 8th Jutra Awards	Frédéric Bégin, Phil Electric	Dodging the Clock (Horloge biologique)	
2006; 8th Jutra Awards	Michel Cusson	The Rocket (Maurice Richard)	
2006; 8th Jutra Awards	Robert Marcel Lepage	The Novena (La Neuvaine)	
2007; 9th Jutra Awards
2007; 9th Jutra Awards	Jorane	A Sunday in Kigali (Un dimanche à Kigali)	
2007; 9th Jutra Awards	Benoît Charest	The Little Book of Revenge (Guide de la petite vengeance)	
2007; 9th Jutra Awards	Michel Corriveau	Bon Cop, Bad Cop	
2007; 9th Jutra Awards	Jorane	Kamataki	
2008; 10th Jutra Awards
2008; 10th Jutra Awards	Catherine Major	The Ring (Le Ring)	
2008; 10th Jutra Awards	Normand Corbeil	My Daughter, My Angel (Ma fille, mon ange)	
2008; 10th Jutra Awards	Stéphane Dufour	The 3 L'il Pigs (Les 3 P'tits Cochons)	
2008; 10th Jutra Awards	FM Le Sieur	Nitro	
2009; 11th Jutra Awards
2009; 11th Jutra Awards	Normand Corbeil, Serge Fiori	Babine	
2009; 11th Jutra Awards	Carl Bastien, Luc Sicard	A No-Hit No-Run Summer (Un été sans point ni coup sûr)	
2009; 11th Jutra Awards	Laurent Eyquem	Mommy Is at the Hairdresser's (Maman est chez le coiffeur)	
2009; 11th Jutra Awards	Robert Marcel Lepage	The Necessities of Life (Ce qu'il faut pour vivre)	

== 2010s ==
Year	Nominee(s)	Film	Ref
2010; 12th Jutra Awards
2010; 12th Jutra Awards	Dédé Fortin, Les Colocs, Éloi Painchaud	Through the Mist (Dédé à travers les brumes)	
2010; 12th Jutra Awards	Benoît Charest	Polytechnique	
2010; 12th Jutra Awards	Bertrand Chenier	Love and Savagery	
2010; 12th Jutra Awards	Normand Corbeil	The Master Key (Grande Ourse, la clé des possibles)	
2010; 12th Jutra Awards	Kate McGarrigle, Anna McGarrigle	Before Tomorrow (Le jour avant le lendemain)	
2011; 13th Jutra Awards
2011; 13th Jutra Awards	Guy Bélanger, Benoît Charest	Route 132	
2011; 13th Jutra Awards	Michel Cusson	Stay with Me (Reste avec moi)	
2011; 13th Jutra Awards	Julien Knafo	Blind Spot (Lucidité passagère)	
2011; 13th Jutra Awards	Philippe Héritier	City of Shadows (La Cité)	
2011; 13th Jutra Awards	Martin Léon	Aurelie Laflamme's Diary (Le Journal d'Aurélie Laflamme)	
2012; 14th Jutra Awards
2012; 14th Jutra Awards	Martin Léon	Monsieur Lazhar	
2012; 14th Jutra Awards	Louis Côté, Claude Lamothe	Snow and Ashes	
2012; 14th Jutra Awards	Pierre Lapointe, Philippe Brault	The Salesman (Le vendeur)	
2012; 14th Jutra Awards	FM Le Sieur	A Sense of Humour (Le Sens de l'humour)	
2012; 14th Jutra Awards	Catherine Major	For the Love of God (Pour l'amour de Dieu)	
2013; 15th Jutra Awards
2013; 15th Jutra Awards	Viviane Audet, Robin-Joël Cool, Éric West-Millette	Camion	
2013; 15th Jutra Awards	Benoît Charest	A Bottle in the Gaza Sea (Une bouteille dans la mer de Gaza)	
2013; 15th Jutra Awards	Benoît Charest	Mars and April (Mars et Avril)	
2013; 15th Jutra Awards	Normand Corbeil	The Torrent (Le Torrent)	
2013; 15th Jutra Awards	Michel Corriveau	Ésimésac	
2014; 16th Jutra Awards
2014; 16th Jutra Awards	Ramachandra Borcar	Rock Paper Scissors (Roche papier ciseaux)	
2014; 16th Jutra Awards	Olivier Auriol	The Legend of Sarila (La Légende de Sarila)	
2014; 16th Jutra Awards	Benoît Charest	Upside Down	
2014; 16th Jutra Awards	Michel Cusson	The Storm Within (Rouge sang)	
2014; 16th Jutra Awards	Thomas Hellman	Fair Sex (Les Manèges humains)	
2015; 17th Jutra Awards
2015; 17th Jutra Awards	Rémy Nadeau-Aubin, Christophe Lamarche-Ledoux	You're Sleeping Nicole (Tu dors Nicole)	
2015; 17th Jutra Awards	Alain Auger	Uvanga	
2015; 17th Jutra Awards	Jeff Barnaby, Joe Barrucco	Rhymes for Young Ghouls	
2015; 17th Jutra Awards	Michel Corriveau	Exile (Exil)	
2015; 17th Jutra Awards	Patrice Dubuc, Gaëtan Gravel	Meetings with a Young Poet	
2016; 18th Quebec Cinema Awards
2016; 18th Quebec Cinema Awards	Martin Léon	My Internship in Canada (Guibord s'en va-t-en guerre)	
2016; 18th Quebec Cinema Awards	Jean-Philippe Bernier, Jean-Nicolas Leupi	Turbo Kid	
2016; 18th Quebec Cinema Awards	Michel Corriveau	Anna	
2016; 18th Quebec Cinema Awards	Gaëtan Gravel, Patrice Dubuc	Elephant Song	
2016; 18th Quebec Cinema Awards	Jenny Salgado, André Courcy, Luc St-Pierre	Scratch	
2017; 19th Quebec Cinema Awards
2017; 19th Quebec Cinema Awards	Frannie Holder, Charles Lavoie, Vincent Legault	Nelly	
2017; 19th Quebec Cinema Awards	Thierry Amar, David Bryant, Kevin Doria	Shambles (Maudite poutine)	
2017; 19th Quebec Cinema Awards	Guy Bélanger	Bad Seeds (Les Mauvaises Herbes)	
2017; 19th Quebec Cinema Awards	Martin Léon	Kiss Me Like a Lover (Embrasse-moi comme tu m'aimes)	
2017; 19th Quebec Cinema Awards	Robert Marcel Lepage	Before the Streets (Avant les rues)	
2018; 20th Quebec Cinema Awards
2018; 20th Quebec Cinema Awards	Pierre-Philippe Côté	Ravenous (Les Affamés)	
2018; 20th Quebec Cinema Awards	Bertrand Chenier	Infiltration (Le problème d'infiltration)	
2018; 20th Quebec Cinema Awards	Dead Obies (Patrice Dubuc, Gaëtan Gravel, Vincent Banville, Gregory Beaudin Kerr, Jonathan Quirion, Jean-Francois Ruel, Pierre Savu-Massé, Charles-André Vincelette)	Family First (Chien de garde)	
2018; 20th Quebec Cinema Awards	Gyan Riley, Terry Riley	Hochelaga, Land of Souls (Hochelaga, terre des âmes)	
2018; 20th Quebec Cinema Awards	Michael Silver	Boost	
2019; 21st Quebec Cinema Awards
2019; 21st Quebec Cinema Awards	Philippe Brault	The Fireflies Are Gone (La disparition des lucioles)	
2019; 21st Quebec Cinema Awards	Olivier Alary	The Great Darkened Days (La grande noirceur)	
2019; 21st Quebec Cinema Awards	Frédéric Bégin	1991	
2019; 21st Quebec Cinema Awards	Philippe Bergeron	We Are Gold (Nous sommes Gold)	
2019; 21st Quebec Cinema Awards	Peter Venne	Before We Explode (Avant qu'on explose)	

== 2020s ==
Year	Nominee(s)	Film	Ref
2020; 22nd Quebec Cinema Awards
2020; 22nd Quebec Cinema Awards	Jean-Michel Blais	Matthias & Maxime	
2020; 22nd Quebec Cinema Awards	Andréa Bélanger, David Ratté	And the Birds Rained Down (Il pleuvait des oiseaux)	
2020; 22nd Quebec Cinema Awards	Jean Massicotte, Jad Orphée Chami	Antigone	
2020; 22nd Quebec Cinema Awards	Howard Shore	The Song of Names	
2020; 22nd Quebec Cinema Awards	Peter Venne	The Twentieth Century	
2021; 23rd Quebec Cinema Awards
2021; 23rd Quebec Cinema Awards	Martin Léon	My Salinger Year (Mon année Salinger)	
2021; 23rd Quebec Cinema Awards	Olivier Alary	Night of the Kings (La nuit des rois)	
2021; 23rd Quebec Cinema Awards	Patrice Dubuc, Gaëtan Gravel	Underground (Souterrain)	
2021; 23rd Quebec Cinema Awards	Guido Del Fabbro, Pierre Lapointe	The Vinland Club (Le Club Vinland)	
2021; 23rd Quebec Cinema Awards	Jean-Phi Goncalves, Éloi Painchaud, Jorane Pelletier	Target Number One	
2022; 24th Quebec Cinema Awards
2022; 24th Quebec Cinema Awards	Philippe Brault	Drunken Birds (Les oiseaux ivres)	
2022; 24th Quebec Cinema Awards	Philippe Brault	Maria Chapdelaine	
2022; 24th Quebec Cinema Awards	Jean Martin, Tanya Tagaq	Bootlegger	
2022; 24th Quebec Cinema Awards	Éloi Painchaud, Fred Pellerin	The Time Thief (L'arracheuse de temps)	
2022; 24th Quebec Cinema Awards	Roger Tellier-Craig	La Contemplation du mystère	
2023; 25th Quebec Cinema Awards
2023; 25th Quebec Cinema Awards	Daniel Bélanger	Confessions of a Hitman (Confessions)	
2023; 25th Quebec Cinema Awards	Viviane Audet, Robin-Joël Cool, Alexis Martin	Family Game (Arseneault et fils)	
2023; 25th Quebec Cinema Awards	Christophe Lamarche-Ledoux, Mathieu Charbonneau	Viking	
2023; 25th Quebec Cinema Awards	Martin Léon	You Will Remember Me (Tu te souviendras de moi)	
2023; 25th Quebec Cinema Awards	Dominique Plante	Red Rooms (Les Chambres rouges)	
2024; 26th Quebec Cinema Awards
2024; 26th Quebec Cinema Awards	Daniel Bélanger	Sisters and Neighbors! (Nos belles-sœurs)	
2024; 26th Quebec Cinema Awards	Viviane Audet, Robin-Joël Cool, Alexis Martin	Tell Me Why These Things Are So Beautiful (Dis-moi pourquoi ces choses sont si belles)	
2024; 26th Quebec Cinema Awards	Michel Corriveau	Ru	
2024; 26th Quebec Cinema Awards	Pierre-Philippe Côté	Humanist Vampire Seeking Consenting Suicidal Person (Vampire humaniste cherche suicidaire consentant)	
2024; 26th Quebec Cinema Awards	Charles Lavoie	Solo	
2025; 27th Quebec Cinema Awards
2025; 27th Quebec Cinema Awards	Philippe Brault	Shepherds (Bergers)	
2025; 27th Quebec Cinema Awards	Amir Amiri, Christophe Lamarche-Ledoux	Universal Language (Une langue universelle)	
2025; 27th Quebec Cinema Awards	Viviane Audet, Robin-Joël Cool, Alexis Martin	Blue Sky Jo (La petite et le vieux)	
2025; 27th Quebec Cinema Awards	Philippe Brault	Two Women (Deux femmes en or)	
2025; 27th Quebec Cinema Awards	Pierre-Philippe Côté	You Are Not Alone (Vous n'êtes pas seuls)	
2025; 27th Quebec Cinema Awards	Christophe Lamarche-Ledoux	Peak Everything (Amour apocalypse)	

== Multiple wins and nominations ==
=== Multiple wins ===
Wins	Composer
3	Daniel Bélanger
3	Philippe Brault
3	Martin Léon
2	Guy Bélanger
2	Ramachandra Borcar

=== Three or more nominations ===
Nominations	Composer
6	Philippe Brault
6	Benoît Charest
6	Michel Corriveau
6	Michel Cusson
6	Martin Léon
5	Gaëtan Gravel
5	Robert Marcel Lepage
4	Viviane Audet
4	Guy Bélanger
4	Robin-Joël Cool
4	Normand Corbeil
4	Patrice Dubuc
4	Christophe Lamarche-Ledoux
3	Bertrand Chenier
3	Daniel Bélanger
3	Pierre-Philippe Côté
3	Jorane
3	FM Le Sieur
3	Alexis Martin
3	Éloi Painchaud

== Combined totals for Best Original Music and Best Original Music in a Documentary ==
=== Multiple wins ===
Wins	Composer
3	Daniel Bélanger
3	Philippe Brault
3	Martin Léon
2	Guy Bélanger
2	Ramachandra Borcar
2	Christophe Lamarche-Ledoux

=== Three or more nominations ===
Nominations	Composer
7	Robert Marcel Lepage
6	Philippe Brault
6	Benoît Charest
6	Michel Corriveau
6	Michel Cusson
6	Martin Léon
5	Gaëtan Gravel
5	Christophe Lamarche-Ledoux
4	Viviane Audet
4	Guy Bélanger
4	Robin-Joël Cool
4	Normand Corbeil
4	Pierre-Philippe Côté
4	Patrice Dubuc
3	Olivier Alary
3	Daniel Bélanger
3	Bertrand Chenier
3	Jorane
3	FM Le Sieur
3	Alexis Martin
3	Éloi Painchaud

== See also ==
- Prix Iris for Best Original Music in a Documentary
- Canadian Screen Award for Best Original Score
- Canadian Screen Award for Best Original Song
