= Viviane Audet =

Canadian actress, singer and composer

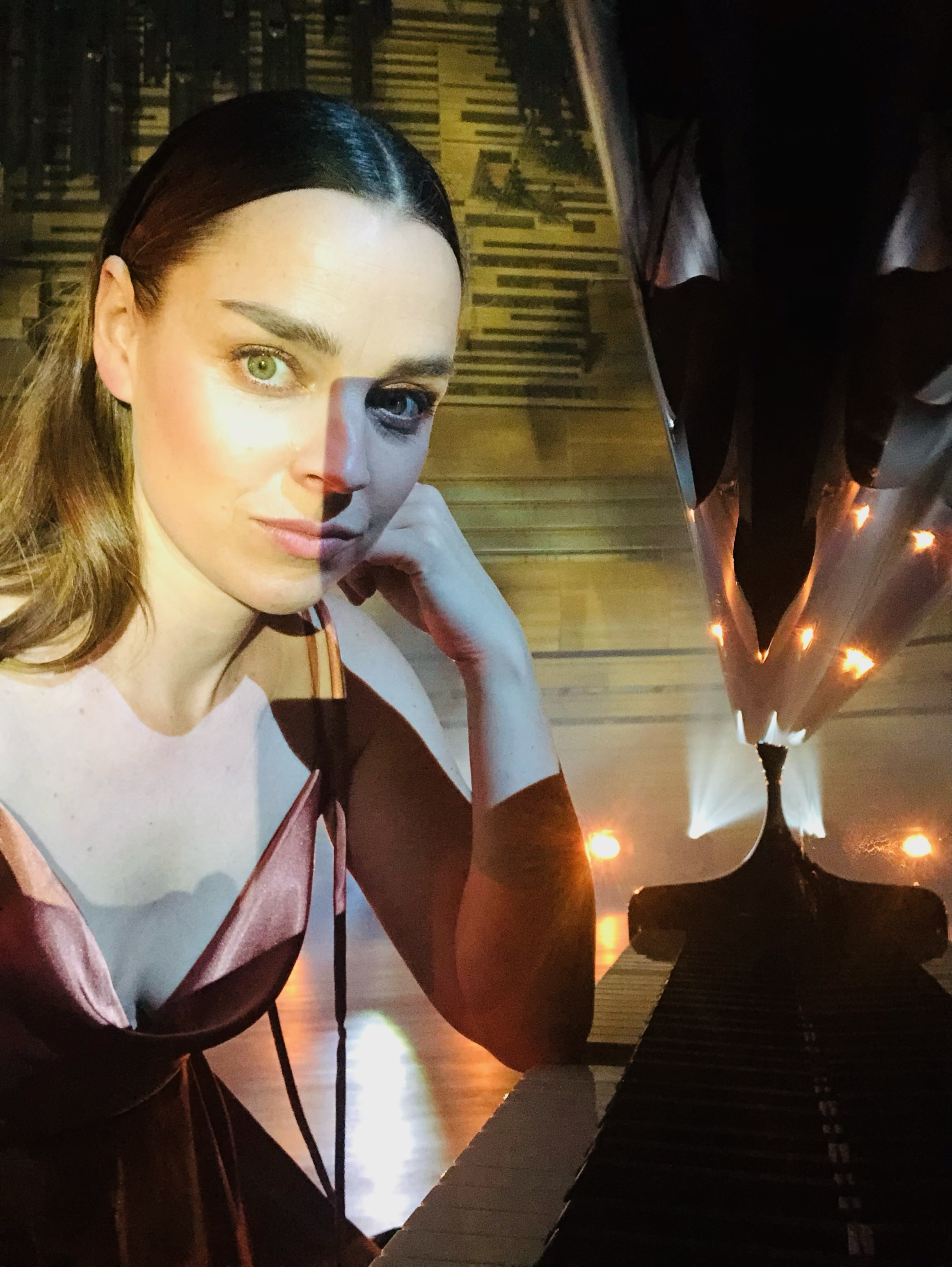
- Born: November 10, 1981 (age 44); Maria, Quebec, Canada
- Years active: 2000s–present
- Spouse: Robin-Joël Cool

Viviane Audet (born November 10, 1981) is a Canadian actress, singer and pianist from Quebec. She is most noted as a frequent collaborator with her husband Robin-Joël Cool, both in the band Mentana and on film and television scores.

She released her debut album, Le Long jeu, in 2006.

== Discography ==
- Le Long jeu - 2006
- Le Couloir des ouragans - 2014
- Les Filles montagnes - 2020
- Les Nuits avancent comme des camions blindés sur les filles - 2023
- Le Piano et le torrent - 2025

== Filmography ==
=== Acting ===
- Grande ourse - 2003–05
- Rumeurs - 2005
- Minuit, le soir - 2006
- Mona's Daughters (Le Cèdre penché) - 2007
- Nos étés - 2008
- The Deserter (Le Déserteur) - 2008
- Belle-Baie - 2008–09
- The Hair of the Beast (Le Poil de la bête) - 2010
- Thrill of the Hills (Frisson des collines) - 2011
- Les Invités - 2012
- Camion - 2012
- Entre la mer et l'écorce - 2016
- Les Pêcheurs - 2016
- District 31 - 2021
- Au bras du lac - 2022

=== Music ===
- Camion - 2012
- Le Plancher des vaches - 2015
- My Daughter Is Not for Sale (Ma fille n'est pas à vendre) - 2017
- Cross My Heart (Les Rois mongols) - 2017
- Shadow Men (Nos hommes dans l'ouest) - 2017
- A Moon of Nickel and Ice (Sur la lune de nickel) - 2017
- Lovebirds (L'amour à la plage) - 2018
- 50/50 - 2018
- Polytechnique: Ce qu'il reste du 6 décembre - 2019
- Passage - 2020
- The Paper Man (Lafortune en papier) - 2020
- The Benevolents (Les Bienvaillants) - 2022
- Virage: double faute - 2023
- Death to the Bikini! (À mort le bikini!) - 2023
- Family Game (Arseneault et fils) - 2022
- Tell Me Why These Things Are So Beautiful (Dis-moi pourquoi ces choses sont si belles) - 2023
- Blue Sky Jo (La petite et le vieux) - 2024
- Haunted (Hantée) - 2026

== Awards ==
| Award | Year | Category | Work | Result | Ref(s) |
|---|---|---|---|---|---|
| Canadian Screen Awards | 2018 | Best Original Score | Cross My Heart (Les Rois mongols) with Robin-Joël Cool, Alexis Martin | Nominated | |
| Prix Iris | 2013 | Best Original Music | Camion with Robin-Joël Cool, Éric West-Millette | Won | |
| Prix Iris | 2023 | Best Original Music | Family Game (Arseneault et fils) with Robin-Joël Cool, Alexis Martin | Nominated | |
| Prix Iris | 2024 | Best Original Music | Tell Me Why These Things Are So Beautiful (Dis-moi pourquoi ces choses sont si belles) with Robin-Joël Cool, Alexis Martin | Nominated | |
| Prix Félix | 2020 | Instrumental Album of the Year | Conséquences (Bande originale de la série) with Robin-Joël Cool, Alexis Martin | Nominated | |
| Prix Félix | 2021 | Instrumental Album of the Year | Les filles montagnes | Nominated | |
| Prix Félix | 2024 | Adult Contemporary Album of the Year | Les nuits avancent comme des camions blindés sur les filles | Nominated | |
| Juno Awards | 2026 | Instrumental Album of the Year | Le Piano et le torrent | Pending | |
