= Marie-Renée Lavoie =

Canadian writer

Marie-Renée Lavoie (born February 21, 1974, in Quebec City) is a Canadian writer from Quebec. She is most noted for her 2010 novel La grande et le vieux, which won the 2012 edition of Le Combat des livres.

Mister Roger and Me, an English translation of La petite et le vieux by Wayne Grady, was published in 2012.

Her second novel, Autopsie d'une femme plate, was published in 2017, and the English translation Autopsy of a Boring Wife followed in 2019. A sequel novel, Diane demande un recomptage, was published in 2020, with the English translation A Boring Wife Settles the Score released in 2021.

Some Maintenance Required, an English translation of her 2018 novel Les chars meurent aussi, is slated for publication in 2022.

La petite et le vieux was adapted by Patrice Sauvé into the 2024 film Blue Sky Jo.
