= Rafaël Ouellet =

Canadian screenwriter and film director

Rafaël Ouellet is a Canadian screenwriter and film director from Dégelis, Quebec.

He launched his career as a cameraman, editor and director for MusiquePlus from 1998 to 2004. He received a Juno Award nomination for Music DVD of the Year at the Juno Awards of 2004, for his work on Our Lady Peace's concert DVD Our Lady Peace Live in Alberta. He then directed episodes of the television series Le Groulx Luxe and Canadian Case Files, and was the editor of Denis Côté's 2005 film Drifting States (Les États nordiques), before releasing his debut feature film, Mona's Daughters (Le cèdre penché), in 2007.

He firstly became widely known for his 2012 film Camion, for which he received Jutra Award nominations for Best Director, Best Screenplay and Best Editing at the 15th Jutra Awards in 2013.

His newest film, Family Game (Arsenault et fils), entered the production process in 2020. It was shot in Ouellet's hometown, and was released in 2022. The film received eight Prix Iris nominations at the 25th Quebec Cinema Awards in 2023, including nods for Ouellet in both Best Director and Best Screenplay.

In 2025, Productions Casablanca announced that Ouellet will write and direct a forthcoming adaptation of Alex Viens's novel Les pénitences. In the same year he entered production on Haunted (Hantée), a fantasy comedy written by India Desjardins about a teenage girl who befriends the ghost haunting her family home.

== Filmography ==
=== Film ===
- Mona's Daughters (Le Cèdre penché) - 2007
- Behind Me (Derrière moi) - 2008
- New Denmark - 2009
- Camion - 2012
- Finissant(e)s - 2013
- Gurov and Anna (Gurov et Anna) - 2015
- Family Game (Arsenault et fils) - 2022
- Haunted (Hantée) - 2026
- Les pénitences - TBA

=== Television ===
- Le Groulx Luxe - 2003
- Canadian Case Files - 2005
- The Phoenix Sessions - 2006
- Pendant ce temps, devant la télé - 2007
- La vie nous arrive - 2012
- Nouvelle adresse - 2014
- Blue Moon - 2018
- Cheval Serpent - 2018
- Ruptures - 2018
- Virage - 2023

=== Music DVDs ===
- Our Lady Peace: Live in Alberta - 2003
- Our Lady Peace: Decade - 2006
- Loose: The Concert (Nelly Furtado) - 2007
