= Finissant(e)s =

- Directed by: Rafaël Ouellet
- Written by: Rafaël Ouellet
- Produced by: Rafaël Ouellet; Daniel Fontaine-Bégin
- Starring: Carla Turcotte
- Cinematography: Pascal L'Heureux
- Edited by: Jules Saulnier
- Music by: David Ratté
- Production company: Urban Sounds
- Distributed by: Estfilmindustri
- Release date: February 23, 2013 (RVCQ)
- Running time: 75 minutes
- Country: Canada
- Language: French

Finissant(e)s is a Canadian docufiction film, directed by Rafaël Ouellet and released in 2013. A hybrid of scripted fiction and documentary, the film is a portrait of a group of young people in Ouellet's hometown of Dégelis, Quebec, over the summer following their graduation from high school.

The film's most noted cast member, Carla Turcotte, subsequently studied acting at university, and went on to a significant career in film and television.

Production of the film was announced in 2012, just a few weeks after the premiere of Ouellet's prior film Camion.

The film premiered at the 2013 Rendez-vous du cinéma québécois, before going into limited commercial release on March 1.
