= Robin-Joël Cool =

Canadian actor, singer and composer

- Born: Tracadie-Sheila, New Brunswick, Canada
- Years active: 2000s–present
- Spouse: Viviane Audet

Robin-Joël Cool is a Canadian actor and musician from Tracadie-Sheila, New Brunswick. He is most noted as a frequent collaborator with his wife Viviane Audet, both in the band Mentana and on film and television scores.

== Filmography ==
=== Acting ===
- Belle-Baie - 2008–09
- Les Rideaux et les meubles - 2009
- Musée Eden - 2010
- A Life Begins (Une vie qui commence) - 2010
- Camion - 2012
- 19-2 - 2011–13
- Trauma - 2014
- Mommy - 2014
- Une histoire vraie - 2015
- Sur-Vie - 2017
- Dehors - 2018
- Conséquences - 2019
- District 31 - 2021
- Au bras du lac - 2022
- Family Game (Arsenault et fils) - 2022
- Plan B - 2023
- Temps de chien - 2023–24
- Bon Cop, Bad Cop - 2026

=== Music ===
- Camion - 2012
- Le Plancher des vaches - 2015
- My Daughter Is Not for Sale (Ma fille n'est pas à vendre) - 2017
- Cross My Heart (Les Rois mongols) - 2017
- Shadow Men (Nos hommes dans l'ouest) - 2017
- A Moon of Nickel and Ice (Sur la lune de nickel) - 2017
- Lovebirds (L'amour à la plage) - 2018
- 50/50 - 2018
- Polytechnique: Ce qu'il reste du 6 décembre - 2019
- Passage - 2020
- The Paper Man (Lafortune en papier) - 2020
- The Benevolents (Les Bienvaillants) - 2022
- Virage: double faute - 2023
- Death to the Bikini! (À mort le bikini!) - 2023
- Family Game (Arseneault et fils) - 2022
- Tell Me Why These Things Are So Beautiful (Dis-moi pourquoi ces choses sont si belles) - 2023
- Blue Sky Jo (La petite et le vieux) - 2024
- Haunted (Hantée) - 2026

== Awards ==
Award	Year	Category	Work	Result	Ref(s)
Canadian Folk Music Awards	2018	Children's Album of the Year	Grand tintamarre ! - Chansons et comptines acadiennes with Joseph Edgar, Lisa LeBlanc, Wanabi Farmeur, Vishtèn, Caroline Savoie, Édith Butler	Won	
Canadian Screen Awards	2018	Best Original Score	Cross My Heart (Les Rois mongols) with Viviane Audet, Alexis Martin	Nominated	
Prix Iris	2013	Best Original Music	Camion with Viviane Audet, Éric West-Millette	Won	
Prix Iris	2023	Best Original Music	Family Game (Arseneault et fils) with Viviane Audet, Alexis Martin	Nominated	
Prix Iris	2024	Best Original Music	Tell Me Why These Things Are So Beautiful (Dis-moi pourquoi ces choses sont si belles) with Viviane Audet, Alexis Martin	Nominated	
Prix Félix	2020	Instrumental Album of the Year	Conséquences (Bande originale de la série) with Viviane Audet, Alexis Martin	Nominated	
Gémeaux Awards	2024	Best Lead Actor in a Comedy Series	Temps de chien	Won	
Gémeaux Awards	2025	Best Lead Actor in a Comedy Series	Temps de chien	Won	
