= Mirrors (2007 film) =

2006 Canadian film

- French: Miroirs d'été
- Directed by: Étienne Desrosiers
- Written by: Étienne Desrosiers; Pascal Soudeyns; My Lan Tho; Joana Kotkowska
- Produced by: Étienne Desrosiers
- Starring: Xavier Dolan; Stéphane Demers
- Cinematography: Stefan Ivanov
- Edited by: Christophe Flambard
- Music by: Pierre Desrochers
- Production company: Productions 7e Vague
- Release date: 2007
- Running time: 14 minutes
- Country: Canada
- Language: French

Mirrors (French: Miroirs d'été) is a Canadian short drama film, directed by Étienne Desrosiers and released in 2007. The film stars Xavier Dolan as Julien, a shy and withdrawn teenager who is spending the summer with his family at a lake cottage, and experiences a sexual awakening when he develops a romantic interest in older neighbour Hervé (Stéphane Demers).

The cast also includes André Nadeau and Julie Beauchemin as Julien's parents, Maxime Allaire as his younger brother Antoine, and Patrick Martin as a teenage boy, never named, who is a rival for Hervé's affections.

The film was labelled as Dolan's breakthrough acting role as an adult, after having previously performed exclusively in children's roles.

The film was subsequently included in Bad Romance, the seventh edition of the Boys on Film series of gay-themed short film DVDs, and as a bonus feature on the DVD release of Dolan's directoral debut film I Killed My Mother (J'ai tué ma mère).
