= Tanya Lapointe =

Canadian filmmaker

- Born: Canada
- Occupations: Film producer, film director, journalist
- Spouse: Denis Villeneuve

Tanya Lapointe is a Canadian film producer, director, and former journalist. She is best known for her work with her husband Denis Villeneuve, and was nominated for an Academy Award for Best Picture for producing Dune: Part Two (2024).

== Career ==
A longtime arts and culture journalist for Ici Radio-Canada, she took a leave of absence from the network in 2015 to work as a production assistant on Villeneuve's film Arrival, subsequently announcing her departure from journalism in 2016. In 2025, Lapointe was nominated alongside Villeneuve for the Academy Award for Best Picture for their work as producers on Dune: Part Two.

Her debut as a documentary filmmaker, 50/50, was broadcast by Radio-Canada in 2018, and examined the gender gap between men and women in society. In 2020, she directed the documentary The Paper Man (Lafortune en papier), about the life of paper artist Claude Lafortune. It debuted at the Whistler Film Festival in 2020, where it won the Audience Award.

She participated in the 2021 edition of Le Combat des livres, advocating for Melchior Mbonimpa's novel Le totem des Baranda.

Lapointe is set as an executive producer of Bond 26, which is set to be directed by Villeneuve.

== Personal life ==
She began dating film director Denis Villeneuve in the mid-2010s. Lapointe and Villeneuve work together on film projects as director-producer partners, with Lapointe saying: "I'm an extension of his brain."

== Filmography ==
Key
†	Denotes films that have not yet been released

Year	Title	Functioned as			Notes
Year	Title	Director	Producer	Other	Notes
2016	Arrival	No	No	Yes	Assistant: Denis Villeneuve
2017	Blade Runner 2049	No	No	Yes	Assistant: Denis Villeneuve
2018	50/50	Yes	Yes	No	Co-directed with Laurence Trépanier
2020	The Paper Man (Lafortune en papier)	Yes	Yes	No	
2021	Dune	No	Executive	No	
2024	Dune: Part Two	2nd unit	Yes	No	
2026	Closing Night	No	Yes	No	
2026	Dune: Part Three †	2nd unit	Yes	No	Post-production

== Bibliography ==
- Bladerunner 2049 – Interlinked – The Art. Titan Books. 2020.
- The Art and Science of Arrival. Titan Books. 2022.
- The Art and Soul of Dune. Insight Editions. 2022.
- The Art and Soul of Blade Runner 2049. Revised and Expanded Edition. Titan Books. 2023.
- The Art and Soul of Dune: Part Two. Insight Editions. 2024.
