= Linda Malo =

Canadian actress and model

- Born: Montreal, Quebec, Canada
- Occupations: Actress, television host, producer
- Years active: 1980s–present

Linda Malo (born c 1964) is a Canadian model, actress, television host, and producer from Quebec. She is best known for her starring role in the 1990s crime miniseries Jasmine, one of the first French-language television dramas in Quebec to feature a Black woman in a leading role.

== Early life ==
Linda Malo was born in Montreal suburb of Rosemount about 1964, one of three daughters of a Quebecois father, Fernand, and a Haitian mother, Marie. Her parents met and married in Haiti. Her father is a professor.

== Modeling career ==
Before entering television, Malo began her career as a fashion model. In the late 1980s, she worked in Paris, where she was noticed by Italian photographer Oliviero Toscani. She later appeared in international advertising campaigns for United Colors of Benetton.

== Acting career ==
In the mid-1990s she was asked to audition for a mixed-race role. Malo returned to Quebec, and made her television acting debut in 1996 as the lead character in the crime miniseries Jasmine on TVA. The television show was one of the first Quebec television drama series to cast a Black woman in a leading role.

After Jasmine, Malo appeared in the television series Virginie, Les poupées russes, Diva, and 30 vies. She also appeared in La Fureur, Empathie and the film The Trotsky (2009). She was also the presenter of Maison de rêve and Bec et museau.

After a break, Malo returned to the television in 2023 on the show Les Perles (The Pearls), Inspirez expirez (Inhale, exhale) and Projet Innocence (Project Innocence).

== Critical reception ==
Malo's role in Jasmine was a major first for French-language television in Quebec.

In 2019, Châtelaine magazine named Malo one of 12 Black women to have had a significant cultural impact in Quebec.

== Selected filmography ==
=== Television ===
- Jasmine (1996) — Jasmine Rocheleau
- Virginie
- Les poupées russes
- Diva
- 30 vies
- Les Perles
- Empathie

=== Film ===
- The Trotsky - 2009
- Haunted (Hantée) - 2026
