= Anna Comes Home =

Canadian television sitcom

- Le retour d'Anna Brodeur
- Genre: Comedy drama
- Created by: Richard Blaimert
- Starring: Julie Le Breton; Benoît McGinnis; Patrick Hivon; Élise Guilbault
- Country of origin: Canada
- Original language: French
- No. of seasons: 2
- No. of episodes: 20

Production
- Executive producer: Bruno Dubé
- Producer: Josée Vallée
- Running time: 43 minutes

Original release
- Network: Crave
- Release: October 30, 2024

Anna Comes Home (Le retour d'Anna Brodeur) is a Canadian comedy drama television series created by Richard Blaimert, which premiered on Crave on October 30, 2024, in both the original French and a subtitled English version. Produced by Sphere Media in collaboration with Bell Media, the series stars Julie Le Breton as Anna Brodeur, a professional screenwriter experiencing culture shock as she returns to Quebec after ten years of self-imposed exile in Paris. Le Breton won the Prix Gémeaux for best lead actress in a comedy or comedy drama in 2025, and she and Benoît McGinnis won lead acting awards in 2026 for the second season. A third season is in production.

The cast also includes Élise Guilbault as Anna's mother Monique, Patrick Hivon as her egotistical ex-boyfriend Antoine, Benoît McGinnis as her talent agent friend Patrick, and Karelle Tremblay as Romane, an actress client of Patrick's who goes through a public relations crisis after her comments about Quebec's lack of action on climate change in a radio interview cause controversy. Other first-season cast members include Rebecca Vachon, Vlad Alexis, Jessica Larsen, Arielle Mailloux, Clémence Lavallée and Gregory Beaudin. The second season added Maripier Morin as Anna's stepmother and Marc Messier as her father along with Macha Limonchik, Valérie Blais, Jean-Moïse Martin and Patrick Emmanuel Abellard.

The series premiered on October 30, 2024, in both the original French and a subtitled English version.

J. Kelly Nestruck described the series as a story about the aftermath of a failed Emily in Paris fantasy.

== Production ==
Crave ordered the series from Sphere Media, with Josée Vallée as producer and Blaimert, who previously wrote Les hauts et les bas de Sophie Paquin as associate producer. The first season has ten episodes and was directed by Sébastien Gagné and Mathieu Cyr. Bruno Dubé is the executive producer. Filming of the second season began in the first weeks of September 2025. A third season is being filmed in the Montreal area and is scheduled to stream on Crave in winter 2027.

== Broadcast ==
The first season premiered on Crave on October 30, 2024, and aired on Noovo beginning September 8, 2025. The first four episodes of the second season were released on Crave on March 12, 2026.

== Accolades ==
At the 40th Prix Gémeaux in 2025, Julie Le Breton won the award for best lead female role in a comedy or comedy drama for the first season. The second season received seven nominations at the 41st Prix Gémeaux, held on September 13, 2026, and Le Breton and Benoît McGinnis each won the award for best lead role in a comedy or comedy drama.
