= Family Game (2022 film) =

- French: Arsenault et fils
- Directed by: Rafaël Ouellet
- Written by: Rafaël Ouellet
- Produced by: Charles-Stéphane Roy; Stéphanie Morissette
- Starring: Guillaume Cyr; Pierre-Paul Alain; Karine Vanasse; Luc Picard
- Cinematography: François Dutil
- Edited by: Myriam Magassouba
- Music by: Viviane Audet; Robin-Joël Cool; Alexis Martin
- Production company: La maison de prod
- Distributed by: Sphere Media
- Release date: June 17, 2022
- Running time: 105 minutes
- Country: Canada
- Language: French

Family Game (French: Arsenault et fils) is a Canadian crime drama film, directed by Rafaël Ouellet and released in 2022.

Set in the Bas-Saint-Laurent region of Quebec, the film centres on the Arsenaults, a family who have been involved in illegal poaching and reselling of wild meat out of the back of the family-owned garage. Older son Adam (Guillaume Cyr) wants to get out of the criminal enterprise and run the business honestly, but finds his plans complicated by the return of his more criminally inclined younger brother Anthony (Pierre-Paul Alain) and the arrival in the town of Émilie (Karine Vanasse), a radio host.

The film's cast also includes Luc Picard as Adam and Anthony's father André, Julien Poulin as their grandfather Armand, and Micheline Lanctôt as their grandmother Irène.

== Production ==
Ouellet has described the film as an attempt to incorporate influences from The Godfather, GoodFellas and the films of James Gray into his own filmmaking style, which has traditionally been character drama driven by dialogue rather than plot. The film was shot in and around Ouellet's own hometown of Dégelis in 2021, and had its commercial theatrical premiere in June 2022.

== Awards ==
Award	Date of ceremony	Category	Recipient(s)	Result	Ref(s)
Prix collégial du cinéma québécois	2023	Best Film	Rafaël Ouellet	Nominated	
Prix Iris	December 10, 2023	Best Film	Stéphanie Morissette, Charles Stéphane Roy	Nominated	
Prix Iris	December 10, 2023	Best Director	Rafaël Ouellet	Nominated	
Prix Iris	December 10, 2023	Best Actor	Guillaume Cyr	Nominated	
Prix Iris	December 10, 2023	Best Screenplay	Rafaël Ouellet	Nominated	
Prix Iris	December 10, 2023	Best Editing	Myriam Magassouba	Nominated	
Prix Iris	December 10, 2023	Best Original Music	Viviane Audet, Robin-Joël Cool, Alexis Martin	Nominated	
Prix Iris	December 10, 2023	Best Sound	Daniel Fontaine-Bégin, Luc Boudrias, Henry Godding Jr.	Nominated	
Prix Iris	December 10, 2023	Best Casting	Nathalie Boutrie	Nominated	
