= Temps de chien =

Canadian television series

Temps de chien (lit. "Dog Time", fig. "Hard Times") is a Canadian television comedy series, which premiered in 2023 on Ici Radio-Canada. The series stars François Bellefeuille as Antoine Meilleur, a veterinarian and former television personality rebuilding his life and career in the Magdalen Islands after being disgraced by scandal.

== Premise ==
The successful and popular host of an animal care segment on the television morning show Soleil Matin, known as "the Ricardo of dog food", Antoine Meilleur's problems start when a dog bites his arm live on the air, leading him to hit the dog several times in anger and damaging his reputation. Soon afterward, the dog food company in which he is a business partner is embroiled in a poisoning scandal, leading that company to cut him out of the business as a public relations strategy even though it wasn't actually his fault. He takes his family to the Magdalens for a few weeks to hide out and figure out his next moves, and is ultimately convinced to become a partner in a small veterinary clinic whose current owner has been struggling, due to the region's small size and remote location, to find anyone else willing to take over his business so he can retire.

The first season centres principally on Antoine and his family learning to adapt to their new circumstances. In the second season, after his own dog falls into a sinkhole caused by coastal erosion while playing fetch, Antoine begins to reinvent himself and rebuild his public prominence as a climate change activist, starting with a campaign for the mayoralty of the island after the current mayor announces his retirement.

== Cast ==
- François Bellefeuille as Antoine Meilleur
- Émilie Bibeau as Antoine's wife Kim Bélanger
- Tom Gohier as their son Félix
- Éric Bernier as Kim's brother Jean-Philippe
- Nathalie Breuer as Manon Gingras, Antoine's former business partner who forced him out of the dog food business
- Gaston Lepage as Armand Lapierre, the aging owner of the Magdalen clinic who is keen to retire
- Robin-Joël Cool as Stéphane, a man who moved to the islands after suffering burnout in his own prior professional career in Montreal and now lives in a caravan near Antoine's home
- Ariel Ifergan as Mathieu Jolicœur, Antoine's rival who was only too happy to replace him on Soleil Matin
- Ariane Castellanos as Danielle, an animal health technician who also comes to the Magdalens to join the clinic after being fired from the dog food company at the same time as Antoine
- Steve Laplante as Pascal, Antoine's campaign manager when he runs for mayor
- Sonia Cordeau as Annie Daviault, another key figure in Antoine's mayoral campaign

Ariel Charest, Sonia Vachon, France Pilotte, Joseph Martin, Pierre-François Legendre, Christophe Payeur, Pierre Aucoin, Samuel Gauthier, Michel Boudreau and Vincent Lafrance also appear in smaller supporting roles.

== Production ==
Bellefeuille is himself a former veterinarian, who left that field when he started to achieve greater success in his side career as a comedian. The production locations included his own real-life vacation home in the Magdalens as the Meilleur family home.

The series was written by Bellefeuille and Olivier Thivierge, and produced by Guillaume Lespérance.

== Distribution ==
The series launched on Radio-Canada's Ici TOU.TV streaming platform in November 2023, before airing on the linear Ici Radio-Canada Télé channel beginning in January 2024.

Production on the second season was announced days after the television premiere. The second season premiered in September 2024, launching concurrently on both the linear and streaming services rather than through an advance streaming preview.

== Awards ==
The series received three Gémeaux Award nominations in 2024, with both Bellefeuille and Cool nominated for Best Actor in a Comedy Series, and Bibeau nominated for Best Actress in a Comedy Series. Cool won the award for Best Actor.
