= Passage (2020 film) =

2020 Canadian documentary film

- Directed by: Sarah Baril Gaudet
- Written by: Sarah Baril Gaudet
- Produced by: Audrey Fallu
- Starring: Gabrielle Goupil; Yoan Duchesne
- Cinematography: Sarah Baril Gaudet
- Edited by: Justine Gauthier
- Music by: Viviane Audet; Robin-Joël Cool; Alexis Martin
- Production company: La Cabane
- Distributed by: Les Films du 3 mars
- Release date: November 19, 2020 (RIDM)
- Running time: 81 minutes
- Country: Canada
- Language: French

Passage is a Canadian documentary film, directed by Sarah Baril Gaudet and released in 2020. The film is a portrait of Gabrielle Goupil and Yoan Duchesne, two teenagers in the Abitibi-Témiscamingue region of Quebec, over the summer when they are facing choices about their future as young adults; Yoan wants to move to the big city so that he can safely come out as gay, while Gabrielle is conflicted about whether she wants to leave to attend university, or stay at home.

The film premiered at the 2020 Montreal International Documentary Festival.

The film received two Prix Iris nominations at the 23rd Quebec Cinema Awards in 2021, for Best Cinematography in a Documentary (Baril Gaudet) and the Public Prize.
