= Haunted (2026 film) =

2026 Canadian fantasy comedy film

- French: Hantée
- Directed by: Rafaël Ouellet
- Written by: India Desjardins
- Produced by: Guillaume Lespérance
- Starring: Jade Brind'Amour; Virginie Fortin; François Létourneau; Evelyne Brochu
- Cinematography: Steve Asselin
- Edited by: David Di Francesco
- Music by: Viviane Audet; Robin-Joël Cool; Alexis Martin
- Production company: A Média Films
- Distributed by: Immina Films
- Release date: October 8, 2026
- Running time: 103 minutes
- Country: Canada
- Language: French

Haunted (French: Hantée) is a Canadian fantasy comedy film, directed by Rafaël Ouellet and released in 2026. The film stars Jade Brind'Amour as Mathilde, a teenage girl who moves to rural Quebec with her parents Louis (François Létourneau) and Judith (Evelyne Brochu); discovering that their new home is haunted, she forges an unlikely friendship with Isabeau (Virginie Fortin), the 19th-century ghost who inhabits the building.

The cast also includes Emma Bao Linh, Mathilde Boucher, Oscar Desgagnés, Farès Chaanebi, Claude Legault, Linda Malo and Katherine Levac in supporting roles.

== Production ==
The film's screenplay was written by India Desjardins.

== Distribution ==
The film had its theatrical premiere on October 8, 2026, at the Monument-National theatre in Montreal, before opening commercially across Quebec the following day.

It will also screen at the 2026 Windsor International Film Festival, in competition for the WIFF Prize in Canadian Film.
