= Juliette Bharucha =

Canadian actress

Juliette Bharucha is a Canadian actress from Quebec. She is most noted for her performance in the 2024 film Blue Sky Jo (La petite et le vieux), for which she received a Prix Iris nomination for Revelation of the Year at the 27th Quebec Cinema Awards in 2025.
