= Sébastien Girard =

Canadian screenwriter

Sébastien Girard is a Canadian screenwriter from Montreal, Quebec. He is most noted for the 2024 film Blue Sky Jo (La petite et le vieux), for which he received a Canadian Screen Award nomination for Best Adapted Screenplay at the 13th Canadian Screen Awards in 2025.

He previously wrote and directed the short film Now That We Know....
