= Renée Blanchar =

Canadian film director, screenwriter and producer

- Occupation: film director
- Awards: Best Atlantic Documentary at the Atlantic International Film Festival

Renée Blanchar is most noted as a two-time winner of the award for Best Atlantic Documentary at the Atlantic International Film Festival, winning in 2018 for Shadow Men (Nos hommes dans l'ouest) and in 2021 for The Silence (Le Silence).

A native of Caraquet, New Brunswick, she is an alumna of the University of Ottawa and the La Fémis film school in Paris, France. While at La Fémis, she was selected as a member of the feature film jury at the 1989 Cannes Film Festival, after Francis Ford Coppola and jury president Wim Wenders sought out a film student to serve on the jury as a youth voice.

In addition to its win at AIFF, The Silence won the award for Best Acadian Feature at the 2020 Festival international du cinéma francophone en Acadie, and was shortlisted for the DGC Allan King Award for Best Documentary Film at the 2021 Directors Guild of Canada awards.

== Filmography ==
=== Film ===
- 1986 — 7:21
- 1990 — La vie sur Mars
- 1991 — Les Pinces d'or
- 1994 — Une Journée particulière
- 1996 — Profession ménagère
- 1998 — The Shed Next Door
- 1999 — Le Temps X
- 2002 — Raoul Léger: The Elusive Truth (Raoul Léger: La vérité morcelée)
- 2003 — 1604
- 2007 — On a tué l'Enfant-Jésus
- 2014 — A Place That Matters (Les héritiers du club)
- 2017 — Shadow Men (Nos hommes dans l'ouest)
- 2020 — The Silence (Le Silence)
- 2022 — A Love Letter to Léopold L. Foulem (Lettre d’amour à Léopold L. Foulem)

=== Television ===
- 1997 — Turning Points of History
- 1997 — Warrior Songs: King Gesar
- 2002-2003 — Artiste dans l'âme
- 2006 — Trésors vivants
- 2007 — Le Souvenir nécessaire
- 2008-2012 — Belle-Baie
- 2017 — Les Monologues de la Sagouine
