= This Life (2015 TV series) =

- Genre: Drama
- Starring: Torri Higginson; Lauren Lee Smith; James Wotherspoon; Stephanie Janusauskas; Julia Scarlett Dan; Kristopher Turner; Shawn Doyle; Rick Roberts; Peter MacNeill; Janet-Laine Green; Rachael Crawford
- Country of origin: Canada
- Original language: English
- No. of seasons: 2
- No. of episodes: 20

Production
- Executive producers: Richard Blaimert; Jocelyn Deschênes; Joseph Kay; Virginia Rankin

Original release
- Network: CBC Television
- Release: October 5, 2015 – December 11, 2016

This Life is a Canadian television drama series. It premiered on October 5, 2015 on CBC. The series is based on the French Canadian series Nouvelle adresse, created by Richard Blaimert. On March 31, 2016 the CBC confirmed the series had been renewed for a second season, to premiere in fall 2016. The show was cancelled on January 24, 2017.

== Plot ==
Focusing on Natalie Lawson, a lifestyle columnist and single mother in her early forties whose terminal cancer diagnosis sends her on a quest to help her three teenage children get ready for the future, while trying her best to live in the now.

== Cast ==
- Torri Higginson as Natalie Lawson
- Lauren Lee Smith as Maggie Lawson
- Rick Roberts as Matthew Lawson
- Kristopher Turner as Oliver Lawson
- James Wotherspoon as Caleb Lawson
- Stephanie Janusauskas as Emma Lawson
- Julia Scarlett Dan as Romy Lawson
- Peter MacNeill as Gerald Lawson
- Janet-Laine Green as Janine Lawson
- Marianne Farley as Nicole Breen
- Rachael Crawford as Danielle Berg
- Helene Xia-Wong as Abigail Lawson-Breen (Abby)
- Shawn Doyle as Andrew Wallace
- Louis Ferreira as David Crowley
- Hamza Haq as Raza Ali
- Ambrosio De Luca as Julian
- Vincent Leclerc as Luke Carson
- Joe Cobden as Gregory Gilchrist
- Melissa O'Neil as Sarah

== Episodes ==
=== Season 1 (2015) ===
No. overall	No. in season	Title	Directed by	Written by	Original release date
1	1	"Gut Punch"	Louis Choquette	Richard Blaimert, Michael MacLennan	October 5, 2015
2	2	"Everything Must Go"	Louis Choquette	Richard Blaimert, Michael MacLennan	October 12, 2015
3	3	"The Part That Decides My Fate"	Louis Choquette	Richard Blaimert, Michael MacLennan	October 26, 2015
4	4	"Love Your Tumour"	Louise Archambault	Richard Blaimert, Joseph Kay	November 2, 2015
5	5	"The Unbelieving"	Louise Archambault	Richard Blaimert, Shelley Eriksen	November 9, 2015
6	6	"Holy Water"	Louise Archambault	Richard Blaimert, Michael MacLennan, Rachel Langer	November 16, 2015
7	7	"Seeing Red"	Louise Archambault	Joseph Kay, Rachel Langer	November 23, 2015
8	8	"My Body Lies Over the Ocean"	Paul Fox	Michael MacLennan	November 30, 2015
9	9	"Dark Retreat"	Paul Fox	Joseph Kay, Rachel Langer	December 7, 2015
10	10	"Should Have Known Better"	Paul Fox	Joseph Kay	December 14, 2015

=== Season 2 (2016) ===
No. overall	No. in season	Title	Directed by	Written by	Original release date
11	1	"Stay Positive"	Lyne Charlebois	Joseph Kay	October 2, 2016
12	2	"Perfect Day"	Lyne Charlebois	Alison Lea Bingeman	October 9, 2016
13	3	"Coping Cards"	Lyne Charlebois	Rachel Langer	October 16, 2016
14	4	"Communion"	Lyne Charlebois	Joseph Kay, Celeste Parr	October 30, 2016
15	5	"Scanxiety"	Ruba Nadda	Joseph Kay, Maxim Morin	November 6, 2016
16	6	"Intervention"	Ruba Nadda	Alison Lea Bingeman	November 13, 2016
17	7	"Joyride"	Ruba Nadda	Joseph Kay	November 20, 2016
18	8	"Deconstruction as Creation"	Louis Choquette	Celeste Parr	November 27, 2016
19	9	"Well Fought, My Love"	Louis Choquette	Rachel Langer	December 4, 2016
20	10	"Choose Life"	Louis Choquette	Joseph Kay	December 11, 2016
