= Bénédicte Décary =

Canadian actress

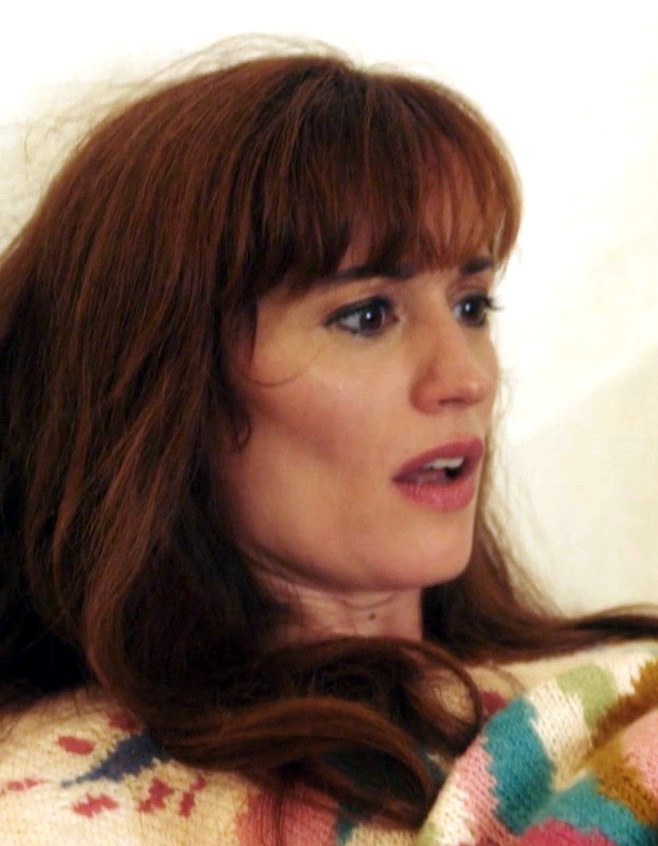
Bénédicte Décary in Pow-Pow in 2017

Bénédicte Décary is a Canadian actress. She is most noted for her performance as Nicole Bélanger in the film Through the Mist (Dédé, à travers les brumes), for which she was a Jutra Award nominee for Best Supporting Actress at the 12th Jutra Awards in 2010, and her recurring role as Eva Arcady in the television series Durham County, for which she was a Gemini Award nominee for Best Supporting Actress in a Drama Program or Series at the 26th Gemini Awards in 2011.

She is married to actor François Papineau, with whom she costarred in the 2021 television series Entre deux draps.

== Filmography ==
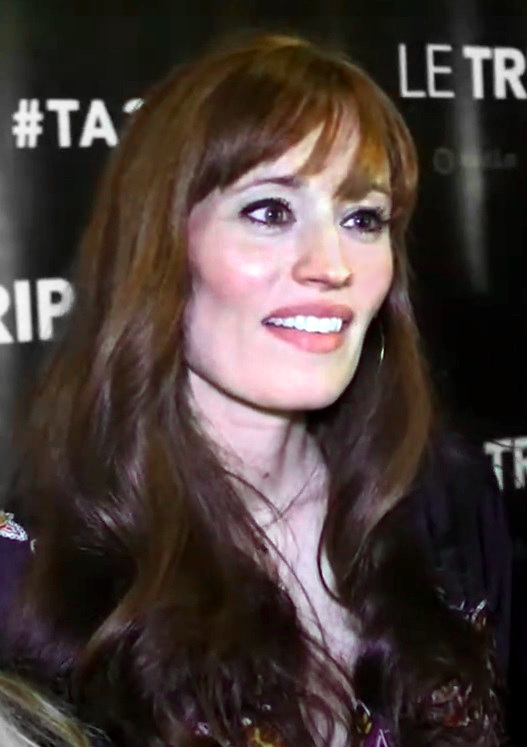
Bénédicte Décary - Le Trip a Trois premiere 2017

=== Film ===
Year	Title	Role	Notes
2004	Premier juillet, le film	Édith	
2004	Battle of the Brave (Nouvelle-France)	Courtesane	
2005	Maman Last Call	Médée	
2006	Family History (Histoire de famille)	Thérèse	
2006	Cadavre exquis première édition	Méphisto	
2008	En plein cœur	Anne-Marie	
2009	Through the Mist (Dédé à travers les brumes)	Nicole Bélanger	
2010	Heartbeats (Les Amours imaginaires)	Young woman	
2010	Face Time	Melissa	
2010	Crying Out (À l'origine d'un cri)	Marilyne	
2015	The Demons (Les Démons)	Nicole	
2016	Bad Seeds (Les Mauvaises herbes)	Marquise de la Creuse	
2016	9	Claudia	
2017	Threesome (Le Trip à trois)	Marie-Josée	
2018	Pow-Pow	Pregnant Woman	Short film
2019	Vu pas vue	Woman	
2020	The Mirror (Le miroir)	Diane, age 35	

=== Television ===
Year	Title	Role	Notes
2004	Les Bougon		
2005	Rumeurs	Receptionist	
2004-06	Un monde à part	Jade Langlois	
2005-06	Le négociateur	Évelyne Madore	
2008	Stan et ses stars	Laurence Lévy	
2008	Mistaken	Eleanor Kendall	
2010	En audition avec Simon	Herself	
2010	Durham County	Eva Arcady	
2011-12	Les Boys	Marie	
2012	En thérapie	Sara	
2012	Mauvais Karma	Véronique	
2016	Mirador	Teacher	
2014-17	Les beaux malaises	Geneviève	
2018	Ruptures	Mahée Nicole D'Anjou	
2020	District 31	Julie Deveau	
2021	Claire et les vieux	Danielle	
2021	Doute raisonnable	Police sergeant	
2021	Entre deux draps	Marie-Ève	
2024	Stat	Ève Lemieux	
