= Blue Sky Jo =

- French: La petite et le vieux
- Directed by: Patrice Sauvé
- Written by: Sébastien Girard
- Based on: La petite et le vieux by Marie-Renée Lavoie
- Produced by: Sonia Despars; Marc Biron
- Starring: Juliette Bharucha; Gildor Roy; Vincent-Guillaume Otis; Marilyn Castonguay
- Cinematography: François Gamache
- Edited by: Claude Palardy
- Music by: Viviane Audet; Robin-Joël Cool; Alexis Martin
- Production company: Parallaxes
- Distributed by: TVA Films
- Release date: August 16, 2024 (Locarno)
- Running time: 105 minutes
- Country: Canada
- Language: French

Blue Sky Jo (French: La petite et le vieux, lit. "The Little Girl and the Old Man") is a Canadian comedy-drama film, directed by Patrice Sauvé and released in 2024. Adapted from Marie-Renée Lavoie's 2010 novel La petite et le vieux, the film stars Juliette Bharucha as Jo-Hélène, a young girl in the blue-collar Limoilou neighbourhood of Quebec City who befriends her elderly neighbour Roger (Gildor Roy).

The cast also includes Vincent-Guillaume Otis and Marilyn Castonguay as Jo-Hélène's parents, as well as Gabrielle B. Thuot, Mia Drolet, Élia St-Pierre, Denis Houle, Jack Robitaille, Amélie Bernard, Marie Michaud, Marie Bernier, Marie-Hélène Gendreau, Linda Laplante, Pierre-Yves Charbonneau, Sacha Lapointe, Amélie Pelletier, Jean-Philippe Côté, Ariane Bellavance-Fafard, Luc Bélanger-Morissette, Karl-Patrice Dupuis, Pierre-Luc Fontaine, Marguerite Bouchard, Andréanne Fortin and Charles Roberge in supporting roles.

== Production ==
The film began production in September 2023, in Quebec City.

== Distribution ==
The film premiered on August 16, 2024, at the 77th Locarno Film Festival.

It had its Canadian premiere as the opening film of the 2024 Quebec City Film Festival, and screened at the 2024 Cinéfest Sudbury International Film Festival, before opening commercially on October 4.

== Awards ==
Award	Date of ceremony	Category	Recipient(s)	Result	Ref(s)
Cinéfest Sudbury International Film Festival	2024	French-Language Feature Film	Patrice Sauvé	Won	
Schlingel International Film Festival	2024	FIPRESCI Jury Prize	Patrice Sauvé	Won	
Quebec Cinema Awards	2025	Best Film	Sonia Despars, Marc Biron	Nominated	
Quebec Cinema Awards	2025	Best Actor	Gildor Roy	Nominated	
Quebec Cinema Awards	2025	Best Supporting Actor	Vincent-Guillaume Otis	Nominated	
Quebec Cinema Awards	2025	Revelation of the Year	Juliette Bharucha	Nominated	
Quebec Cinema Awards	2025	Best Original Music	Viviane Audet, Robin-Joël Cool, Alexis Martin	Nominated	
Quebec Cinema Awards	2025	Prix Michel-Côté	Sonia Despars, Marc Biron, Yoann Sauvageau, Patrice Sauvé, Sébastien Girard	Nominated	
