= Patrick Hivon =

Canadian actor from Quebec (born 1975)

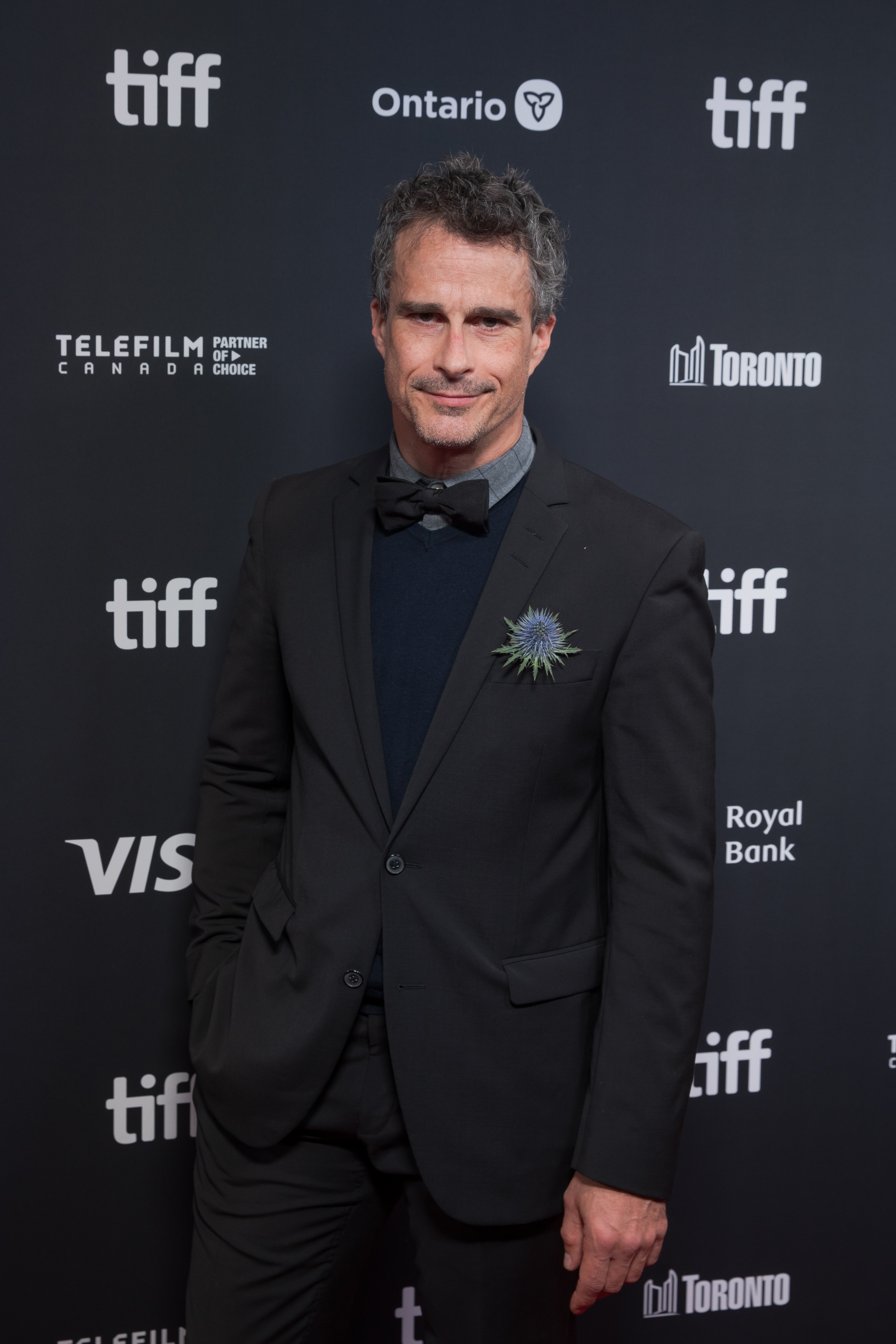
- Born: July 5, 1975 (age 51); Montreal, Quebec, Canada
- Occupation: Actor

Patrick Hivon (born July 5, 1975) is a Canadian actor from Montreal, Quebec.

He was a Jutra Award nominee for Best Supporting Actor at the 17th Jutra Awards in 2015 for Guardian Angel (L'Ange gardien), a Gémeaux Award nominee as Best Supporting Actor in a Drama Series in 2015 for Nouvelle adresse, a Canadian Screen Award nominee for Best Supporting Actor at the 4th Canadian Screen Awards in 2016 for Ville-Marie, and a Prix Iris nominee for Best Actor at the 21st Quebec Cinema Awards in 2019 for We Are Gold (Nous sommes Gold), and at the 25th Quebec Cinema Awards in 2023 for Babysitter.

Hivon was primarily associated with stage and television roles, including the television series 2 frères, Rumeurs, Lance et compte and Providence, and theatre productions of Daniel Danis' Le Langue-à-langue des chiens de roche and Michel Marc Bouchard's Les feluettes, until landing his first major film role in the 2010 film Crying Out (À l'origine d'un cri).

== Filmography ==
=== Film ===
Year	Title	Role	Notes
2004	The Bridge (Le Pont)		
2007	December (Décembre)	Guillaume	
2010	Crying Out (À l'origine d'un cri)	Son	
2012	L'Affaire Dumont	Paquin	
2013	Émilie	Patrick	
2014	Guardian Angel (L'Ange gardien)	Guylain	
2015	Noir	Phil	
2015	Demain et l'autre d'après	Gabriel	
2015	Ville-Marie	Pierre Pascal	
2016	Bad Seeds (Les Mauvaises herbes)	Alexandre	
2016	A Kid (Le Fils de Jean)	Ben	
2017	Ravenous (Les Affamés)	Race driver	
2019	We Are Gold (Nous sommes Gold)	Kevin Laplante	
2019	A Brother's Love (La femme de mon frère)	Karim	
2019	Mont Foster	Mathieu	
2019	Thanks for Everything (Merci pour tout)		
2019	Restless River (La rivière sans repos)	Beaulieu	
2020	Shooting Star (Comme une comète)	Christopher	
2022	Babysitter	Cédric	
2023	Humanist Vampire Seeking Consenting Suicidal Person (Vampire humaniste cherche suicidaire consentant)	Mr. Goyette	
2024	Wandering Zero	One	
2024	A Christmas Storm (Le Cyclone de Noël)	Jean-François Despatie	
2025	Peak Everything (Amour Apocalypse)	Adam	

=== Television ===
Year	Title	Role	Notes
2000	2 frères	Danny	Two episodes
2002	Lance et compte: Nouvelle génération	Danny Bouchard	One episode
2003	Les aventures tumultueuses de Jack Carter	Jean-Philippe	Two episodes
2003	Chartrand et Simonne	Jean-Pierre Cantin	Three episodes
2004	Lance et compte: La Reconquête	Danny Bouchard	10 episodes
2004	Temps dûr	Lulu Gagné	Three episodes
2004-07	Rumeurs	David	17 episodes
2005	Providence	Maxime Bélanger	12 episodes
2011	Fabrique-moi un conte	The Beast before transformation	Miniseries
2012	Vertige	Laurent Duguay	
2013	Trauma	Marc-André Dubé	One episode
2014	Agent Secret	Tom	Eight episodes
2014	Nouvelle adresse	Olivier Lapointe	Four episodes
2015	Catastrophe	Patrick	
2015	Karl & Max	Greg Nesterenko	10 episodes
2015-16	Sharp	Adam Roy	Miniseries
2017-18	Faits divers	Sylvain Lauzon	Six episodes
2018	Dehors	Arnaud	TV movie
2019	Cerebrum	Patrick Lemire	One episode
2019	The Wall (La Faille)	Bruno Lamontagne	Eight episodes
2022	The Night Logan Woke Up (La nuit où Laurier Gaudreault s'est réveillé)	Julien Larouche	Miniseries
2022-25	L'Œil du cyclone	Jean-François Despatie	40 episodes
2023	Désobéir: le choix de Chantale Daigle	Maître David Thomas	Miniseries
2023	Détective Surprenant : la fille aux yeux de pierre	André Surprenant	Miniseries
2024	Anna Comes Home (Le retour d'Anna Brodeur)	Antoine Girard	
