= Cover Girl (TV series) =

- Genre: Sitcom
- Created by: Richard Blaimert
- Starring: René Richard Cyr; Vincent Bolduc; Frédéric Pierre
- Country of origin: Canada
- No. of episodes: 26

Production
- Running time: 30 minutes

Original release
- Network: Radio-Canada
- Release: January 2005 – December 2005

Cover Girl is a Canadian French language television sitcom, which aired on Radio-Canada in 2005. Created and written by Richard Blaimert, the series revolved around three drag queens sharing ownership of Cover Girl, a gay nightclub and drag cabaret in downtown Montreal.

The series premiered in the winter of the 2004-05 television season, and was renewed for a second season which aired in fall 2005, for a total of 26 episodes. One of Quebec's most noted drag queens, Mado Lamotte, criticized the show as unrealistic.

The series garnered several Gemeaux Award nominations in 2006, including Best Comedy Series and nods for René Richard Cyr and Vincent Bolduc as Best Actor in a Comedy Series.

== Cast ==
- René Richard Cyr as Mathieu Picard/Veronica Sinclair
- Vincent Bolduc as Justin Pearson-Faucher-Brodeur/Joujou Velcro
- Frédéric Pierre as Newton da Costa/Lana Brown
- Gilles Renaud as Cherry Sundae
- Suzanne Clément as Camille Langlois
- Stéphane Demers as David
- Anne-Marie Cadieux as Brenda Lepine
- Patrick Huard as Norma Champaine
