= Boys on Film =

Short film series

Boys on Film is a Peccadillo Pictures DVD series of compilations of independent LGBT-themed shorts.

== Chronology DVD ==
- 2009: Boys on Film 1: Hard Love
- 2009: Boys on Film 2: In Too Deep
- 2009: Boys on Film 3: American Boy
- 2010: Boys on Film 4: Protect Me From What I Want
- 2010: Boys on Film 5: Candy Boy
- 2011: Boys on Film 6: Pacific Rim
- 2011: Boys on Film: Bad Romance
- 2012: Boys on Film 8: Cruel Britannia
- 2013: Boys on Film 9: Youth in Trouble
- 2013: Boys on Film X
- 2014: Boys on Film 11: We Are Animals
- 2014: Boys on Film 12: Confession
- 2015: Boys on Film 13: Trick & Treat
- 2016: Boys on Film 14: Worlds Collide
- 2016: Boys on Film 15: Time & Tied
- 2017: Boys on Film 16: Possession
- 2017: Boys on Film 17: Love is the Drug
- 2018: Boys on Film 18: Heroes
- 2019: Boys on Film 19: No Ordinary Boy
- 2020: Boys on Film 20: Heaven Can Wait
- 2021: Boys on Film 21: Beautiful Secret
- 2022: Boys on Film 22: Love to Love You
- 2023: Boys on Film 23: Dangerous To Know
- 2024: Boys on Film 24: Happy Endings

== Noteworthy films ==
Noteworthy films distributed as part of the series have included:

- Aban and Khorshid
- Age 17
- For Dorian
- Heiko
- Hole
- I Am Syd Stone
- It's Not a Cowboy Movie
- James
- Just Friends?
- Manivald
- Mirrors
- Pyotr495
- The Strange Ones
- Trevor
- Trouser Bar
- The Violation
- The Wilding
- A World for Raúl
- The Young and Evil
