= Mona's Daughters =

- French: Le Cèdre penché
- Directed by: Rafaël Ouellet
- Written by: Rafaël Ouellet
- Produced by: Claudie Bouchard; Denis Côté; Daniel Fontaine-Bégin; Stéphanie Morissette; Rafaël Ouellet
- Starring: Viviane Audet; Marie-Neige Chatelin
- Cinematography: Rafaël Ouellet
- Edited by: Rafaël Ouellet
- Music by: Gilles Vincent-Martel
- Production companies: Estfilmindustri; UrbanSounds
- Release date: February 23, 2007 (RVCQ)
- Running time: 78 minutes
- Country: Canada
- Language: French

Mona's Daughters (French: Le Cèdre penché, lit. "The Leaning Cedar Tree") is a Canadian drama film, directed by Rafaël Ouellet and released in 2007. The film stars Viviane Audet and Marie-Neige Chatelin as Candide and Brigitte, two sisters who are coping with the recent death of their mother Mona, a prominent country singer, by preparing to record a version of their mother's best known song together.

The cast also includes Joanie Allard, Stéphane Michaud and Gilles-Vincent Martel in supporting roles.

== Production ==
The film, Ouellet's directorial debut, was shot in and around his hometown of Dégelis, Quebec, in 2006.

== Distribution ==
The film premiered at the 2007 Rendez-vous du cinéma québécois, where it was the winner of the Prix du public. It was later screened in the Canada First program at the 2007 Toronto International Film Festival.

The film's commercial release was delayed until 2008, due to an unspecified dispute with the Union des artistes.
