= Fall (TV series) =

Indian-Tamil language thriller drama television series

- Release poster
- Original title: ஃபால்
- Genre: Horror drama
- Directed by: Siddharth Ramaswamy
- Starring: Anjali; Santhosh Prathap; Sastika Rajendran; Poornima Bhagyaraj; Sonia Agarwal; Namita Krishnamurthy; S. P. Charan
- Music by: Ajesh
- Country of origin: India
- Original language: Tamil
- No. of seasons: 1
- No. of episodes: 7

Production
- Executive producer: Gowtham Selvaraj
- Producer: Deepak Dhar; Rajesh Chadha
- Cinematography: Siddarth Ramaswamy
- Editor: Kishan Chezhian
- Running time: 40–55 minutes
- Production company: Banijay Asia; Circle Box Entertainment

Original release
- Network: Disney+ Hotstar
- Release: 9 December – 23 December 2022

Related
- Vertige

Fall is a 2022 Indian Tamil-language thriller drama television series, which is an official remake of the Canadian television miniseries Vertige. The series was directed by Siddharth Ramaswamy for Disney+ Hotstar under the banner of Banijay Asia and Circle Box Entertainment.

The principal characters of the series include Anjali, Santhosh Prathap, Sastika Rajendran, Poornima Bhagyaraj, Namita Krishnamurthy, Sonia Agarwal and S. P. Charan. The series is about a young women who wakes up from a coma, a coma that was caused by an alleged suicide attempt she has no memory of. Fall premiered on 9 December 2022, and consists of seven episodes.

It was announced on Saturday 16 September 2022 that the series will be released in Tamil and dubbed in Telugu, Hindi, Malayalam, Kannada, Marathi and Bengali will make its streaming debut on 9 December, on Disney+ Hotstar.

== Cast ==
- Anjali as Dhivya
- Santhosh Prathap as Daniel
- Sastika Rajendran as Krithika
- Poornima Bhagyaraj as Dhivya's mother
- Namita Krishnamurthy as Maya
- S. P. Charan as Rohit Selvakumar
- Sonia Agarwal as Malar
- Thalaivasal Vijay as Dhivya's father
- "Put Chutney" Rajmohan as Thirukumaran
- Yohan as Jeeva

== Episodes ==
No.	Title	Directed by	Written by	Original release date
1	"Plunged into Darkness"	Siddarth Ramaswamy	Kishan C Chezhiyan	9 December 2022
2	"Waking up from the Abyss"	Siddarth Ramaswamy	Kishan C Chezhiyan	9 December 2022
3	"Web of Lies"	Siddarth Ramaswamy	Kishan C Chezhiyan	9 December 2022
4	"What Lies Beneath"	Siddarth Ramaswamy	Kishan C Chezhiyan	16 December 2022
5	"Prey in the Shadows"	Siddarth Rangaswamy	Kishan C Chezhiyan	16 December 2022
6	"Truth Unwinds"	Siddarth Rangaswamy	Kishan C Chezhiyan	23 December 2022
7	"The Fall"	Siddarth Rangaswamy	Kishan C Chezhiyan	23 December 2022
