= Nicole Bélanger =

Canadian novelist and screenwriter

Nicole Bélanger is a Canadian novelist and screenwriter from Quebec. She is most noted for her novel Salut mon roi mongol ! and its film adaptation Cross My Heart (Les Rois mongols), for which she received a Canadian Screen Award nomination for Best Adapted Screenplay at the 6th Canadian Screen Awards.

She was formerly romantically linked with musician Dédé Fortin, and was the credited cowriter of several songs by his band Les Colocs. She was portrayed by Bénédicte Décary in the film Through the Mist (Dédé, à travers les brumes).
