= Richard Blaimert =

Canadian actor

Richard Blaimert is the stage name and pen name of Richard Tremblay (born December 30, 1964, in Les Éboulements, Quebec), a Canadian television actor, writer and producer from Quebec. He is best known as the creator and writer of several television series for both English and French networks in Canada, including Les Hauts et les bas de Sophie Paquin, Cover Girl, Sophie, Nouvelle adresse and This Life.

== Career ==
As an actor, he created his stage name by rearranging the letters of his surname, to distinguish himself from several other Richard Tremblays active in Quebec's creative scene at the time. He had minor roles in the television series Peau de banane, Traboulidon, Poivre et sel and Paul, Marie et les enfants, and the film Intimate Power (Pouvoir intime), before landing his most noted role as Edmond Pronovost in the drama series Les Filles de Caleb.

He turned to writing for the teen drama series Watatatow in the 1990s, and wrote an episode of Diva, before creating his first series, Le Monde de Charlotte, in 2000. Following that show's conclusion in 2004, he created the sequel series Un monde à part. Cover Girl debuted in 2005, Les Hauts et les bas de Sophie Paquin in 2006, the English adaptation Sophie in 2009, and Penthouse 5-0 in 2011. Nouvelle adresse followed in 2014, and its English adaptation This Life premiered in 2015.

In 2011, he sold remake rights for Le Monde de Charlotte to NBC for a series pilot titled Isabel. The pilot was not picked up to series.

Other series he has created have included Hubert et Fanny, Cerebrum and Anna Comes Home (Le retour d'Anna Brodeur).

== Personal life ==
Blaimert is out as gay, and includes gay characters in virtually all of his television projects. He resides in both Montreal and Los Angeles.
