= Marilyn Castonguay =

Canadian actress

- Born: 10 November 1984 (age 41)
- Education: National Theatre School of Canada
- Notable work: L'Affaire Dumont; Guardian Angel (2014 film); Miraculum

Marilyn Castonguay is a Canadian actress, best known for her performance in the 2012 film L'Affaire Dumont. A graduate of the National Theatre School of Canada, her performance in L'Affaire Dumont garnered a nomination for Best Actress at the 1st Canadian Screen Awards.

She has also appeared in the films Louis Cyr, Miraculum, Guardian Angel (L'Ange gardien), This Is Our Cup (Ça sent la coupe), An Extraordinary Person (Quelqu'un d'extraordinaire), Wild Skin (La peau sauvage), The Decline (Jusqu'au déclin), Frontiers (Frontières) and Blue Sky Jo (La petite et le vieux), and the television series Vertige, Au secours de Béatrice, Fatale-Station, Happily Married (C'est comme ça que je t'aime) and Good Morning Chuck (Bon matin Chuck, ou l'art de réduire les méfaits).
