= Tideline (film) =

- French: Littoral
- Directed by: Wajdi Mouawad
- Written by: Wajdi Mouawad; Pascal Sanchez
- Based on: Tideline (Littoral) by Wajdi Mouawad
- Produced by: Brigitte Germain; Pascal Judelewicz
- Starring: Steve Laplante; Gilles Renaud; Isabelle Leblanc
- Cinematography: Romain Winding
- Edited by: Yvann Thibaudeau
- Music by: Mathieu Farhoud-Dionne; Amon Tobin
- Production companies: EGM Productions; Les Films de Cinéma
- Distributed by: TVA Films
- Release date: September 13, 2004 (TIFF)
- Running time: 96 min
- Countries: Canada; France
- Language: French

Tideline (French: Littoral) is a Canadian-French drama film, directed by Wajdi Mouawad and released in 2004. The film stars Steve Laplante as Wahab, a Lebanese Canadian man whose estranged father (Gilles Renaud) dies, leading Wahab to undertake a trip to Lebanon to bury his father's body in his home country, only to run into complications that send him wandering around the country and reveal aspects of his father's life that he never knew.

The film was adapted from Mouawad's own stage play, and was his first foray into film direction.

Its cast also includes Miro Lacasse, Isabelle Leblanc, David Boutin, Pascal Contamine, Manon Brunelle, Estelle Clareton, Thérèse Boulad, Hani Mattar, Abla Farhoud, Pierre Curzi and Stéphane F. Jacques.

The film premiered in September 2004 at the 2004 Toronto International Film Festival, before premiering commercially in November.

== Production ==
The original play was the winner of the Governor General's Award for French-language drama at the 2000 Governor General's Awards. It was the first part of a thematically related, but not strictly sequential, trilogy of plays about characters of Middle Eastern origins confronting family secrets, followed by Scorched (Incendies) and Forests (Forêts).

The second play formed the basis for the 2010 film Incendies, which was directed by Denis Villeneuve; Forests has not been adapted as a film at all as of 2023.

The portions of the film set in Lebanon were actually filmed principally in Albania.

== Critical response ==
The film received mixed reviews from critics. Sandra Martin of The Globe and Mail rated it three stars, writing that "Mouawad deftly juxtaposes cultural aspirations with the brutal realities of a continuing and forgotten war with a humour that is both poignant and cynical," while David Laplante of Variety was more critical, writing that "while Laplante deftly conveys the shellshocked frustration of a man jolted out of his comfort zone, director Mouawad’s theatrical approach makes the mannered drama seem increasingly artificial."

Marc-André Lussier of La Presse criticized the film for casting predominantly white québécois actors as Lebanese characters, and wrote that Mouawad had not been entirely successful in transposing the story from a theatrical to a cinematic presentation.
