= Sarah Baril Gaudet =

Canadian filmmaker

Sarah Baril Gaudet is a Canadian documentary filmmaker and cinematographer from Quebec. She is most noted for her films Passage, for which she was a Prix Iris nominee for Best Cinematography in a Documentary at the 23rd Quebec Cinema Awards in 2021, and The Benevolents (Les Bienveillants), which was a Canadian Screen Award nominee for Best Short Documentary at the 11th Canadian Screen Awards in 2023.

She previously directed the short documentary films Living Here (Là où je vis) and Before Fall (Avant l'automne), and was a cinematographer on Ludovic Dufresne's short film Analogue and Justine Gauthier's short film The Apartment (L'Appartement).

Originally from Rouyn-Noranda, Quebec, she is a 2016 graduate of the film studies program at the Université du Québec à Montréal.
