= Shadow Men (2017 film) =

- French: Nos hommes dans l'ouest
- Directed by: Renée Blanchar
- Screenplay by: Renée Blanchar
- Produced by: Maryse Chapdelaine
- Cinematography: Philippe Lavalette
- Edited by: Elric Robichon
- Music by: Viviane Audet; Robin-Joël Cool; Alexis Martin; François Richard
- Production company: Ça Tourne Productions
- Distributed by: National Film Board of Canada
- Release date: November 2017 (FICFA)
- Running time: 80 minutes
- Country: Canada
- Language: French

Shadow Men (French: Nos hommes dans l'ouest, lit. "Our Men in the West") is a Canadian documentary film, directed by Renée Blanchar and released in 2017. The film centres on three Acadian men who are working as migrant workers in the Athabasca oil sands, profiling the impact of their extended absence from their families on both themselves and their wives and children back home.

The film premiered at the 2017 Festival international du cinéma francophone en Acadie. It was subsequently screened at the 2018 Atlantic International Film Festival, where it won the award for Best Atlantic Documentary.

The film received a retrospective screening in the In Focus program at the 2025 Atlantic International Film Festival.
