= Guardian Angel (2014 film) =

- Film poster
- French: L'Ange gardien
- Directed by: Jean-Sébastien Lord
- Written by: Jean-Sébastien Lord
- Produced by: Ziad Touma
- Starring: Guy Nadon; Marilyn Castonguay; Patrick Hivon; Véronique Le Flaguais
- Cinematography: Geneviève Perron
- Edited by: Jean-François Bergeron
- Music by: Ramachandra Borcar
- Production company: Couzin Films
- Release date: February 24, 2014
- Running time: 95 minutes
- Country: Canada
- Language: French

Guardian Angel (French: L'Ange gardien) is a Canadian drama film, directed by Jean-Sébastien Lord and released in 2014.

The film stars Guy Nadon as Normand, a man who works as a night security guard in an office building. One night he catches Nathalie (Marilyn Castonguay) and Guylain (Patrick Hivon) attempting a robbery; he chases them off, but is surprised when Nathalie returns a few weeks later to request his help because her relationship with Guylain is abusive. Meanwhile, he is attempting to salvage his troubled relationship with his wife Monique (Véronique Le Flaguais). The film was shot in Montreal, primarily in the Mile End.

The film premiered at the Rendez-vous du cinéma québécois in February 2014.

The film received two Prix Jutra nominations at the 17th Jutra Awards, for Best Actor (Nadon) and Best Supporting Actor (Hivon).
