= The Benevolents =

2021 Canadian short documentary film

- French: Les Bienveillants
- Directed by: Sarah Baril Gaudet
- Written by: Sarah Baril Gaudet
- Produced by: Sarah Baril Gaudet
- Cinematography: Sarah Baril Gaudet
- Edited by: Justine Gauthier
- Music by: Viviane Audet; Robin-Joël Cool; Alexis Martin
- Distributed by: Travelling Distribution
- Release date: 2021 (FICFA)
- Running time: 16 minutes
- Country: Canada
- Language: French

The Benevolents (French: Les Bienveillants) is a Canadian short documentary film, directed by Sarah Baril Gaudet and released in 2021. An exploration of contemporary loneliness and the importance of human social connection, the film is a portrait of various people who are training to become volunteers for Tel-Aide, a crisis hotline in Montreal, Quebec.

The film premiered at the 2021 Festival international du cinéma francophone en Acadie. It was subsequently distributed principally through Op-Docs, The New York Times's streaming platform for documentaries.

== Awards ==
At the 2022 Hot Docs Canadian International Documentary Festival, the film received an honorable mention for the Betty Youson Award for Best Canadian Short Documentary. It was a nominee for Best Short Documentary at the 2022 IDA Awards, and a Canadian Screen Award nominee for Best Short Documentary at the 11th Canadian Screen Awards in 2023.
