= Cross My Heart (2017 film) =

- French: Les Rois mongols
- Directed by: Luc Picard
- Written by: Nicole Bélanger
- Based on: Salut mon roi mongol! by Nicole Bélanger
- Produced by: Stéphanie Pages; Luc Chatelain
- Starring: Milya Corbeil Gauvreau; Henri Richer-Picard; Anthony Bouchard; Alexis Guay; Clare Coulter; Julie Ménard; Maude Laurendeau; Jean-François Boudreau; Martin Desgagne; Sophie Cadieux; Bobby Beshro; Nicola-Frank Vachon; Emmanuel Charest; Gary Boudreault; Gabriel Lemire
- Cinematography: François Dutil
- Edited by: Carmen Mélanie Pépin
- Music by: Viviane Audet; Robin-Joël Cool; Alexis Martin
- Production company: Echo Media
- Distributed by: Telefiction Distribution
- Release date: September 22, 2017
- Running time: 102 minutes
- Country: Canada
- Language: French

Cross My Heart (French: Les Rois mongols) is a 2017 Canadian drama film directed by Luc Picard.

Set in 1970, the film centres on Manon (Milya Corbeil Gauvreau), a young girl who is staying with her aunt and uncle (Jean-François Boudreau and Julie Ménard) as her father is dying of cancer and her mother is struggling with depression. Scared that she may be taken by children's aid and separated from her younger brother Mimi (Anthony Bouchard), she takes inspiration from the contemporaneous October crisis and kidnaps elderly neighbour Rose (Clare Coulter) so that she, Mimi and their cousins Martin (Henri Richer-Picard) and Denis (Alexis Guay) can safely travel to an isolated rural cabin where Manon hopes to live free of parental interference.

The film was written by Nicole Bélanger, as an adaptation of her novel Salut mon roi mongol!.

The film was selected at the prestigious Berlin International Film Festival in 2018.

== Plot ==
During the October Crisis, when the Front de libération du Québec kidnap Canada's British ambassador James Cross and then the Quebec cabinet minister Pierre Laporte, Manon is a young girl in an impoverished Montreal family. Her father is suffering from cancer, and while her mother is suffering a nervous breakdown, she takes over the bulk of responsibility in caring for her younger brother, Mimi. The two children spend most of their time at the house of their aunt and uncle Simone and Gaston, with their cousins Martin and Denis. Observing the FLQ Manifesto read on the news, Manon is unable to understand if the FLQ are good or bad, and the conservative Gaston argues with his revolutionary son, Paul. Feeling neglected, Manon writes her own "manifesto" on children's rights. Manon and Mimi overhear they will be placed in a foster home. Seeking to avert this, Manon decides, based on the news, that taking a hostage is the way to get what one wants. She and Martin plot kidnapping an elderly woman, Mrs. Robinson, and write a ransom letter threatening to execute her unless demands are met, signing it the "Family Cell". Manon decides to omit mention of the foster home until their second "communique". They convince Mimi of the appeal of the plan by telling him he will finally have a "grandmother". Martin and Manon appear at Mrs. Robinson's house in Halloween costumes, and successfully seize and drug her. Manon, Martin, Denis and Mimi then take her to an unused cabin in Saint-Zénon, Quebec.

With the four children missing, the police are contacted. Paul soon emerges as the suspect in kidnapping the four children when the police find he has a collection of revolutionary literature, including White Niggers of America. Neither the family nor police know where Paul is. At Saint-Zénon, when Mrs. Robinson wakes up, the children realize she only speaks English, and the French-speaking children can only communicate with her in a very limited way. When Mrs. Robinson begins to have heart issues, Manon and Martin also realize she requires medication and is running low on pills. They visit a pharmacy, but the pharmacist is unwilling to fill a Montreal subscription.

The children are able to communicate to Mrs. Robinson that they want a grandmother, and Mrs. Robinson is willing to read to Mimi and Denis and bake them a cake. However, the pharmacist sees a newspaper article about the four missing children, and recognizing Manon and Martin, alert the police. The police head to Saint-Zénon to arrest Paul, but do not find him there. They take the children into custody, while Mrs. Robinson, having a heart attack, is taken out on an ambulance. Paul is located in prison, arrested after the federal government invoked the War Measures Act.

Manon and Mimi's father dies and Mrs. Robinson attends the funeral. Mimi is then transferred to a foster home, while Manon is placed in a centre for juvenile delinquents. When a social worker accidentally leaves Mimi's new address and the centre's keys in front of Manon, Manon uses them to escape and travel to the foster home. She picks up Mimi in the night, promising to take him to Disneyland, and the two siblings set out on foot.

== Accolades ==
The film received six Canadian Screen Award nominations at the 6th Canadian Screen Awards in 2018.

Award	Date of ceremony	Category	Recipient(s)	Result	Ref(s)
Berlin International Film Festival	15–25 February 2018	Crystal Bear	Luc Picard	Won	
Canadian Screen Awards	11 March 2018	Best Supporting Actress	Clare Coulter	Nominated	
Canadian Screen Awards	11 March 2018	Best Adapted Screenplay	Nicole Bélanger	Nominated	
Canadian Screen Awards	11 March 2018	Best Art Direction / Production Design	Guillaume Couture	Nominated	
Canadian Screen Awards	11 March 2018	Best Costume Design	Brigitte Desroches	Nominated	
Canadian Screen Awards	11 March 2018	Best Sound	Pierre Bertrand, Stéphane Bergeron, Shaun-Nicholas Gallagher, Maxime Potvin	Nominated	
Canadian Screen Awards	11 March 2018	Best Original Score	Viviane Audet, Robin-Joël Cool, Alexis Martin	Nominated	
Prix Iris	3 June 2018	Best Film	Stéphanie Pages, Luc Chatelain	Nominated	
Prix Iris	3 June 2018	Best Director	Luc Picard	Nominated	
Prix Iris	3 June 2018	Best Screenplay	Nicole Bélanger	Won	
Prix Iris	3 June 2018	Best Cinematography	Francois Dutil	Nominated	
Prix Iris	3 June 2018	Best Art Direction	Guillaume Couture	Nominated	
Prix Iris	3 June 2018	Best Costume Design	Brigitte Desroches	Nominated	
Prix Iris	3 June 2018	Best Hairstyling	Jean-Luc Lapierre, Denis Parent	Nominated	
Prix Iris	3 June 2018	Best Casting	Emanuelle Beaugrand-Champagne, Nathalie Boutrie, Frédérique Proulx	Won	
