= A Moon of Nickel and Ice =

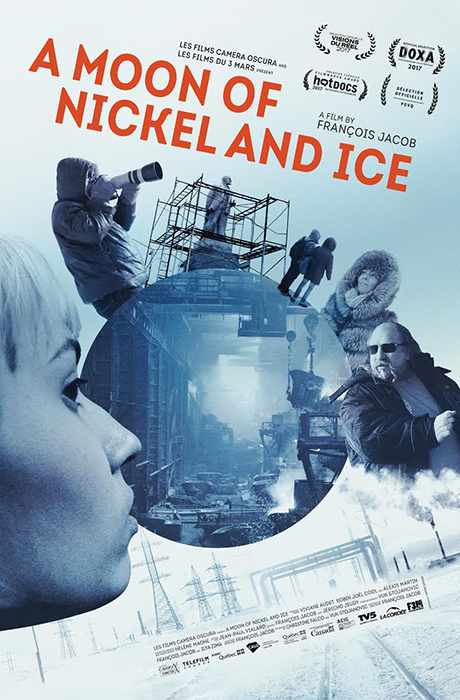
- Sur la lune de nickel
- Directed by: François Jacob
- Produced by: Christine Falco; François Jacob; Vuk Stojanovic
- Cinematography: François Jacob; Vuk Stojanovic; Ilya Zima
- Edited by: François Jacob; Jéricho Jeudy
- Music by: Viviane Audet; Robin-Joël Cool; Alexis Martin
- Production company: Les Films Camera Oscura
- Distributed by: Journeyman Pictures
- Release date: 2017
- Running time: 110 minutes
- Country: Canada
- Language: French

A Moon of Nickel and Ice (French: Sur la lune de nickel) is a 2017 Canadian documentary film, directed by François Jacob. The film profiles history and culture of the isolated Russian mining city of Norilsk.

== Awards ==
The film was screened at the 2017 Hot Docs Canadian International Documentary Festival, where Jacob won the Emerging Canadian Filmmaker Award. At the DOXA Documentary Film Festival, the film received an honourable mention for the Best Canadian Documentary Film award.

The film received three Canadian Screen Award nominations at the 6th Canadian Screen Awards, for Best Feature Length Documentary, Best Cinematography in a Documentary (Jacob, Vuk Stojanovic and Ilya Zima) and Best Editing in a Documentary (Jacob and Jéricho Jeudy).
