= Claude Lafortune =

Canadian paper artist (1936–2020)

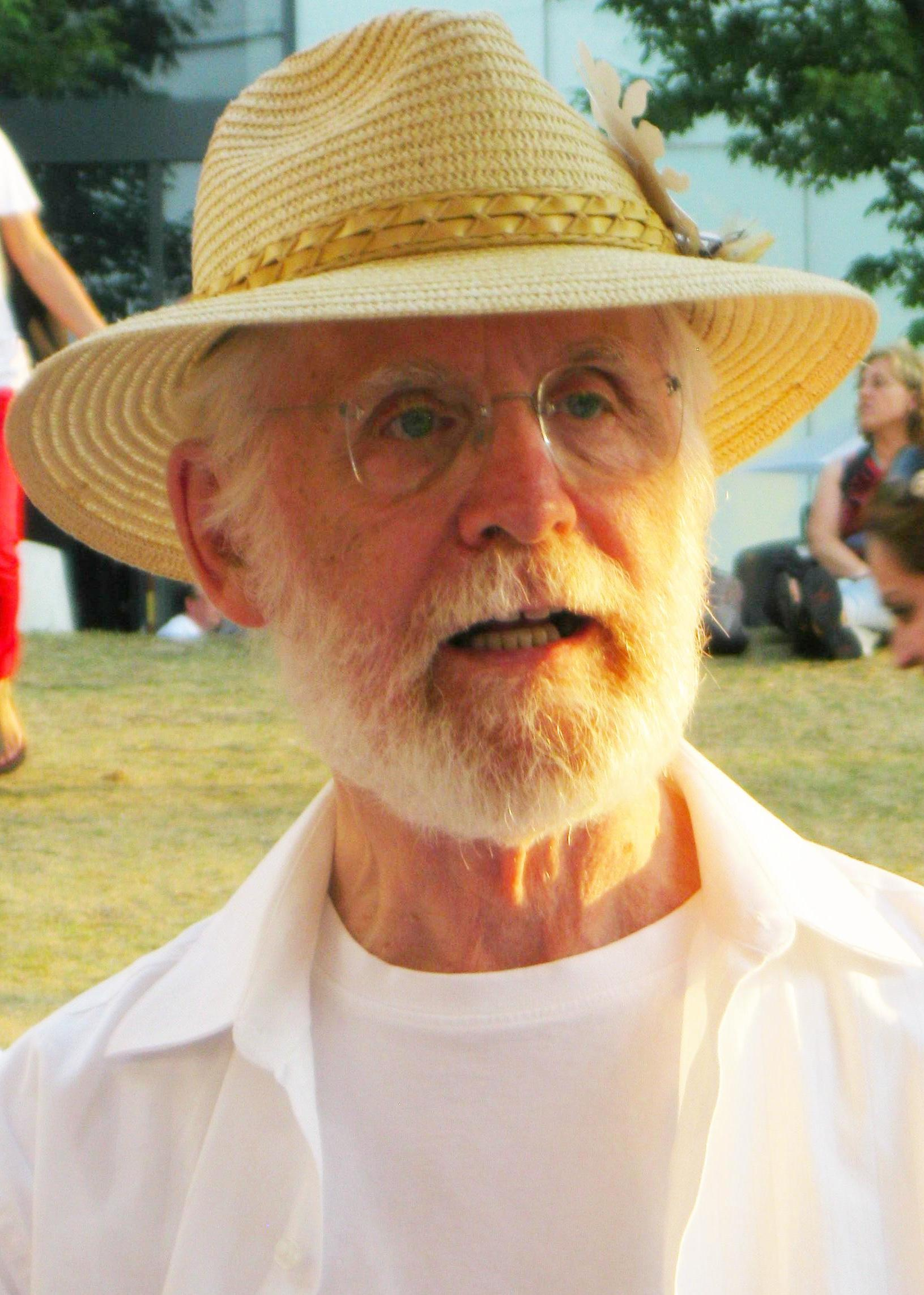
- Lafortune in 2012
- Born: 5 July 1936; Montreal, Quebec, Canada
- Died: 19 April 2020 (aged 83); Longueuil, Quebec, Canada
- Occupation: Artist

Claude Lafortune (5 July 1936 – 19 April 2020) was a Canadian paper artist, set decorator, and television personality.

== Biography ==
A graduate of the École des beaux-arts de Montréal, Lafortune collaborated on many graphic design projects before he became famous for his paper art.

He had an exhibit devoted to his paper art work—titled Colle, papier, ciseaux—at the Musée des cultures du monde in Nicolet, Quebec. The exhibition has traveled to Longueuil, Montreal, Terrebonne, Salaberry-de-Valleyfield, Lachine, Chicoutimi, Bonaventure, La Malbaie, and New Brunswick.

Lafortune died in Longueuil, Quebec, aged 83, after contracting COVID-19 during the COVID-19 pandemic in Canada.

He is the subject of Tanya Lapointe's 2020 documentary film The Paper Man (Lafortune en papier).

== Prizes ==
- Prix du meilleur décor at the Festival d'Art Dramatique de Montréal (1965)
- Prix Alvine-Bélisle (1977-1978)
- Prix de littérature de jeunesse of the Canada Council (1977)
- Prix Anik of the Canadian Broadcasting Corporation (1978)
- The International Association of Printing House Craftsmen Prize (1982)
- Prize of the Association Nationale des téléspectateurs (1982)
- Prix de reconnaissance de l'Office des communications sociales pour l'ensemble de l'œuvre d'une personne à la télévision religieuse (1988)
- Prix d'excellence de l'Alliance pour l'enfant et la télévision (1992)
- Prix Gémeaux of the Academy of Canadian Cinema & Television (1994)
- Prix spécial de l'Alliance pour l'enfant et la télévision pour le couronnement d'une carrière (1995)
- Prix Paul-Blouin of Ici Radio-Canada Télé (2000)
- Trophée le Masque, La très belle histoire de Noël (2002)
- Prix Citoyen d'exception of the City of Longueuil (2016)
- Docteur honoris causa from the Université du Québec à Montréal
- Gold Medal of the Lieutenant-Governor of Quebec (2018)

== Television appearances ==
- La Ribouldingue (1968–1971)
- Sol et Gobelet (1968–1971)
- Du soleil à cinq cents (1973–1976)
- L'Évangile en papier (1975–1976)
- La Bible en papier (1976–1977)
- Es-tu d'accord? (1976–1977)
- L'Église en papier (1977–1978)
- Québékio (since 1980)
- La souris verte
- Nicole et Pierre (1986–1988)
- Parcelles de soleil (1988–2000)

== Filmography ==
- IXE-13

== Stage theater appearances ==
- Naïves Hirondelles (1965)
- Ballade pour un Révolutionnaire (1965)
- La grosse tête (1969)
- La très belle histoire de Noël (2001–2006)
- Don Quichotte (2009)
