= The Paper Man (2020 film) =

- French: Lafortune en papier
- Directed by: Tanya Lapointe
- Produced by: Tanya Lapointe; Marika Lapointe
- Starring: Claude Lafortune
- Cinematography: Hugo Duford-Proulx
- Edited by: Hugo Duford-Proulx
- Music by: Viviane Audet; Robin-Joël Cool; Alexis Martin
- Distributed by: PSLT
- Release date: December 10, 2020 (Whistler)
- Running time: 80 minutes
- Country: Canada
- Language: French

The Paper Man (French: Lafortune en papier, lit. "Lafortune in Paper") is a Canadian documentary film, directed by Tanya Lapointe and released in 2020. The film is a portrait of Claude Lafortune, a paper artist who was an influential personality in Québécois children's television.

Lapointe began making the film in 2018 with an intention to work toward releasing it in 2021 or 2022, but sped up production following Lafortune's death of COVID-19 in April 2020. The film premiered at the 2020 Whistler Film Festival, where it received an honourable mention from the jury for the Whistler Film Festival Documentary Award, and won the Audience Award.
