= We Are Gold =

- French: Nous sommes Gold
- Directed by: Éric Morin
- Written by: Éric Morin
- Produced by: Olivier Picard; David Pierrat
- Starring: Monia Chokri; Patrick Hivon; Vincent Bilodeau; Fabien Cloutier
- Cinematography: Jean-François Lord
- Edited by: Joël Vaudreuil
- Music by: Philippe B
- Release date: February 28, 2019 (RVCQ)
- Running time: 100 minutes
- Country: Canada
- Language: French

We Are Gold (French: Nous sommes Gold) is a Canadian drama film, directed by Éric Morin and released in 2019.

The film stars Monia Chokri as Marianne, a successful indie rock musician returning to her hometown in the Abitibi-Témiscamingue region of Quebec for the first time since the death of her parents in a mining accident ten years earlier.

The cast also includes Patrick Hivon, Vincent Bilodeau, Fabien Cloutier, Clare Coulter, Arsinée Khanjian, Alexis Martin, Emmanuel Schwartz, Steve Laplante and Catherine De Léan.

The film received two Prix Iris nominations at the 21st Quebec Cinema Awards, for Best Actor (Hivon) and Best Original Music (Philippe B).
