= Death to the Bikini! =

2023 Canadian short film directed by Justine Gauthier

- French: À mort le bikini!
- Directed by: Justine Gauthier
- Written by: Justine Gauthier
- Produced by: Léonie Hurtubise
- Starring: Mia Garnier
- Cinematography: Gabrielle Bergeron-Leduc
- Edited by: Marie-Pier Grignon
- Music by: Viviane Audet; Robin-Joël Cool
- Production company: Colonelle Films
- Distributed by: Travelling Distribution
- Release date: March 25, 2023 (Regard)
- Running time: 16 minutes
- Country: Canada
- Language: French

Death to the Bikini! (French: À mort le bikini!) is a Canadian short comedy-drama film, written and directed by Justine Gauthier and released in 2023. The film stars Mia Garnier as Lili, a young girl who rebels when her parents force her to start wearing a bikini top when she goes swimming, due to her approaching puberty.

The cast also includes Étienne Cardin, Johnnovan Jobin, Aksel Leblanc, Olivier Leblanc, Ève Pressault and Éric Robidoux.

The film premiered in March 2023 at the Regard short film festival in Saguenay, Quebec, where it won the jury award for best youth film. Later screenings included the 2023 Cinéfest Sudbury International Film Festival, where it was the winner of the Audience Choice award for short films, and the 2024 Festival Plein(s) Écran(s), where it won the Prix du public.

The film received a Canadian Screen Award nomination for Best Live Action Short Drama at the 12th Canadian Screen Awards in 2024.
