= Philippe B =

Canadian singer-songwriter

- Born: Philippe Bergeron; Rouyn-Noranda, Quebec, Canada
- Origin: Montreal, Quebec, Canada
- Genres: Folk, pop
- Instrument: Vocals
- Years active: 2005–present
- Label: Bonsound
- Formerly of: Gwenwed
- Website: philippeb.ca

Philippe B is a francophone singer-songwriter based in Montreal.

== Career ==
Born Philippe Bergeron in Rouyn-Noranda, Quebec, Canada, Philippe B is the former lead vocalist for Gwenwed. He was also a session guitarist for Pierre Lapointe on his eponymous album. He released his first self-titled solo album in 2005 on label Proxenett Records. That same year he played at the Festival de musique emergente in Abitibi-Témiscamingue, where he also played the song "Philadelphia" for television show Mange ta ville. He then set off on a promotional tour in Québec, which ended in 2006 with a show at Les FrancoFolies de Montréal. He was also chosen to participate in the Sacré Talent event for Radio-Canada.

In 2008 he released his second album Taxidermie, also on Proxenett.

In 2009 Philippe B co-wrote two songs with Pierre Lapointe, "Le bar des suicidés" and "À moi" for the album Sentiments humains and also wrote two songs for Stéphanie Lapointe, "Eau salée" and "Une fleur".

He came up with the musical conception for the play Silence Radio, presented in fall 2009 at Espace libre in Montreal, before embarking on the promotional tour for Sentiments humains with Lapointe, with around 50 concert dates across Québec and France.

Philippe B received the grant for creation from the Conseil des arts et des lettres du Québec, to write new material for his third album.

In fall 2009, in collaboration with actress Sophie Cadieux, he also participated in the creation of a multi-disciplinary show (song, poetry, photography) entitled Phéromones, which was presented at the bistro in Vivo, in Montreal.

In 2014, Philippe B won the Félix award at L'ADISQ for songwriter of the year ("Auteur-compositeur de l'année").

Amongst all of his projects, Philippe B recorded Groenland's album The Chase along with Guido Del Fabbro, opened for headliner Mara Tremblay and has also played guitar and was music director of Salomé Leclerc.

In 2017, he released his fifth album La grande nuit vidéo, via Bonsound.

In 2019 he composed music for the film We Are Gold (Nous sommes Gold), receiving a Prix Iris nomination for Best Original Music at the 21st Quebec Cinema Awards.

== Discography ==
=== Albums ===
- Philippe B (Proxenett, 2005)
- Taxidermie (Proxenett, 2008)
- Variations fantômes (Bonsound, 2011)
- Ornithologie, la nuit (Bonsound, 2014)
- La grande nuit vidéo (Bonsound, 2017)

=== Singles ===
- "Les anges dans nos campagnes" (2007)
- "Fille à plumes" (cover of a Malajube song 2009 for Bonsound's fifth anniversary)

== Videos ==
- Philadelphie (2006)
- Archipels (2007)
- Je n'irais pas à Bilbao (2008)
