= The Deserter (2008 film) =

- French: Le déserteur
- Directed by: Simon Lavoie
- Written by: Simon Lavoie (play)
- Produced by: Simon Lavoie
- Starring: Émile Proulx-Cloutier; Raymond Cloutier; Danielle Proulx; Viviane Audet; Benoît Gouin; Gilles Renaud
- Release date: 2008
- Running time: 90 min
- Country: Canada
- Language: French

The Deserter (French: Le déserteur [lə dezɛʁtœʁ]) is a 2008 Quebec feature film directed by Simon Lavoie. The film stars Émile Proulx-Cloutier, Raymond Cloutier, Danielle Proulx, Viviane Audet, Benoît Gouin and Gilles Renaud.

It tells the story of Georges Guénette, a deserter from the Canadian Army during World War II, who was shot and killed by members of the Royal Canadian Mounted Police.

== Background ==
Georges Guénette was a deserter from the Canadian Army and, like many French Canadians during World War II, an opponent of the war and conscription.

In May 1944, a few months after Guénette deserted from the army, four Royal Canadian Mounted Police (RCMP) officers found Guenette in his father's farmhouse, in St-Lambert-de-Lévis (near Quebec City). He jumped out of a window and ran across the fields. Guénette fell, wounded "by a ricocheting bullet," and died without the last rites of the church.

Two RCMP officers were later charged with manslaughter in Guénette's death, and the shooting was an issue in the 1944 Quebec general election.
