= Canadian Case Files =

Canadian television series

Canadian Case Files was a 2005 Canadian television series about the investigation of unsolved crimes in Canada. It was hosted by Art Hindle.
