= Vertige (TV series) =

Canadian TV miniseries

- Genre: Drama-thriller
- Written by: Michelle Allen
- Directed by: Patrice Sauvé
- Starring: Fanny Mallette; Noémie Godin-Vigneau; Normand Daneau; Germain Houde; Monique Spaziani; Marilyn Castonguay; Patrick Hivon; Sophie Nélisse
- Composer: Normand Corbeil
- Country of origin: Canada
- Original language: French
- No. of seasons: 1
- No. of episodes: 6

Production
- Executive producers: Jacqueline Bouchard; Sylvie Desrochers; Carole Dufour
- Producer: André Dupuy
- Running time: 45 minutes
- Production company: Pixcom

Original release
- Network: Séries+
- Release: March 15 – April 19, 2012

Related
- Fall

Vertige is a six-episode Canadian television miniseries, which aired on Séries+ in 2012. Written by Michelle Allen and directed by Patrice Sauvé, the series centres on the friends and family of Daphnée Roussel (Fanny Mallette), a woman who has been in a coma since falling off the roof of the family business three months earlier. The series was produced by Pixcom.

The cast includes Noémie Godin-Vigneau as her friend Jennifer, who wonders if the fall was a suicide attempt; Normand Daneau as her brother Adrien, who wants to take her off life support; Germain Houde and Monique Spaziani as her parents Gilles and Diana, who own the building but are being pressured by Adrien to sell it; Marilyn Castonguay as her sister Maya, who begins to suspect Adrien of having attempted to murder Daphnée; and Patrick Hivon as Daphnée's boyfriend Laurent, who also appears to have had potential motives to kill her.

The series received 13 Prix Gémeaux nominations in 2012. It won eight awards, for Best Direction in a Drama Series, Best Writing in a Drama Series, Best Editing in a Drama Series, Best Sound in a Drama Series, Best Original Music in a Drama Series, Best Theme Song, Best Costume Design and Best Hair and Make-Up.

Following its run on Séries+, the series was rebroadcast on TVA in 2014, and was added to Netflix in 2018.
