= Patrice Sauvé =

Canadian film and television director

Patrice Sauvé is a Canadian film and television director from Quebec, most noted as director of the fantasy thriller television series Grande Ourse and its film adaptation The Master Key (Grande Ourse, la clé des possibles).

He worked in television, winning a Gemini Award for Best Direction in a Comedy Program or Series at the 20th Gemini Awards in 2005 for an episode of Ciao Bella, before releasing his debut feature film Cheech in 2006. The Master Key followed in 2009; he then returned to television, winning a Gémeaux Award for Best Direction in a Drama Series in 2012 for Vertige, and did not release another feature film until Ça sent la coupe in 2017.

His fourth feature film, Blue Sky Jo (La petite et le vieux), premiered at the 77th Locarno Film Festival in 2024.

== Filmography ==
=== Films ===
- Cheech - 2006
- The Master Key (Grande Ourse, la clé des possibles) - 2009
- This Is Our Cup (Ça sent la coupe) - 2017
- Blue Sky Jo (La petite et le vieux) - 2024

=== Television ===
- Génération W - 1997
- Arnaques - 1998
- La Vie, la vie - 2001
- Grande Ourse - 2003
- Ciao Bella - 2004
- L'Héritière de Grande Ourse - 2005
- The Parent Family (Les Parent) - 2010
- Vertige - 2012
- Karl & Max - 2016
- Victor Lessard - 2017
- Le Monstre - 2019
- La Faille - 2019–21
- Larry - 2022
