= Sophie (TV series) =

- Genre: Sitcom
- Created by: Richard Blaimert
- Starring: Natalie Brown; Sebastian Spence; Amy Lalonde; Jeff Geddis; Mimi Kuzyk; Sara Botsford; Chantelle Chung; Catherine Bérubé
- Country of origin: Canada
- No. of seasons: 2
- No. of episodes: 32

Production
- Executive producer: Jocelyn Deschênes
- Running time: 30 minutes (including commercials)

Original release
- Network: CBC
- Release: January 9, 2008 – March 23, 2009

Sophie is a Canadian television sitcom that aired on CBC from January 9, 2008, to March 23, 2009.

It stars Natalie Brown as Sophie Parker, an unmarried single mother and talent agent. The show is an English-language adaptation of Télévision de Radio-Canada's show Les Hauts et les bas de Sophie Paquin.

The show was created by Richard Blaimert and its executive producer is Jocelyn Deschênes, the same creative team behind the original series. It was the CBC's second attempt in as many years to create an English adaptation of a successful series from its French sister network, following the less successful Rumours.

In February 2008, it was announced that the show had been bought by ABC Family, part of Disney–ABC Television Group in the United States. The network signed on for the first 13 episodes, as well as an option for the second season of the show.

On March 27, 2009, the series was cancelled by CBC due to extremely low ratings.

== Characters ==
- Sophie Parker (Natalie Brown) is a businesswoman and single mother who runs her own talent agency. Just hours after being told by a psychic that she was about to have the worst year of her life, her boyfriend Rick ran off with her best friend Melissa while Sophie was still pregnant with what she and Rick thought was Rick's baby. Soon afterward, she gave birth and discovered that the baby (named Robert) couldn't be Rick's child after all: he's half black. It turns out Robbie was conceived in a one-night stand Sophie had with André (played by Lyriq Bent in flashbacks), whom she met in a cab in New York City. At first, she did not have any contact with him and went as far as shredding his business card. But in the first-season finale, he would later show up to see her, and upon learning that he was a father, he walked out on Sophie and left her devastated, only to return hours later to see Sophie with her ex-boyfriend Rick at her apartment.
- Rick Ryder (Sebastian Spence) is Sophie's ex-boyfriend and former business partner who now runs his own competing talent agency which stole most of Sophie's clients. Despite the end of their relationship, however, they can't seem to get away from each other, in part because Sophie's mother is constantly plotting to reunite them. His continued presence in Sophie's life also complicates her efforts to find a new boyfriend: in one episode, he accidentally sees Melissa giving Sophie's current love interest a few pointers on how Sophie likes to be flirted with, mistakes him for someone Melissa is seeing behind his back, and later punches him in the face at a gallery show. In the first-season finale, he almost asked Melissa to marry him, but when that failed he saw Sophie crying over being rejected by André and as they were about to go get a drink, he sees André walking towards the two.
- Melissa Bryant (Amy Lalonde) is Sophie's former best friend and Rick's current girlfriend. A bit ditzy, she still thinks of Sophie as a dear friend — even helping her to line up dates and begging her to dogsit — and is unaware of how much she hurt Sophie by stealing Rick. She dotes on her dog like a baby, sometimes giving it more attention and TLC than she gives Rick. In the first-season finale, Rick tried to ask Melissa to marry him, only to have the two argue, resulting in Rick leaving and Melissa furious.
- Matt Scott (Jeff Geddis) is Sophie's gay best friend and confidant. Although in a relationship with Verner, a Swiss immigrant, he is not entirely committed to it and also has an eye for Bernard, a waiter at the café where he and Sophie hang out, and eventually slept with. In the end, he did confess to Verner and eventually made up by going off to Switzerland together.
- Judith Parker (Mimi Kuzyk) is Sophie's manipulative controlling mother. She is determined to reunite Sophie and Rick, faking a suicide attempt so that she can insist that they take care of her together and deliberately interfering when Sophie dates anyone who isn't Rick.
- Estelle Burroughs (Sara Botsford) is a pretentious and flighty actress who affects a Received Pronunciation English accent, and the only client of Sophie's agency who didn't defect to Rick's new firm (although Sophie wouldn't be upset if she did). She was also the mistress of Sophie's late father for many years (as Sophie tells Judith about why she was signed to the agency, "She came with the deal. He put it in the will."), complicating her professional relationship with Sophie, but at times comes through for her. In one episode, Estelle played a part in getting Sophie a sought-after client after she recognized Estelle from in a play called Learning Rainbows and was a fan of Estelle. She thinks of herself as a positive force in Sophie's life, which makes one of them.
- Ophelia Burroughs (Chantelle Chung) is Estelle's teenage daughter, whom Estelle adopted from China. Ophelia has no love for Estelle whatsoever.
- Bridget (Catherine Bérubé) is Sophie's scheming receptionist, constantly trying to angle her way into a more senior job with the agency.
- Christian Parker (Tyler Hynes) is Sophie's younger brother. Recently paroled from prison, he is determined to exploit his family connections to launch his own reality show depicting his experience as an ex-con readjusting to life "on the outside".

== Production ==
On February 5, 2008, it was announced that American broadcast rights to Sophie were purchased by ABC Family, which aired the series in 2009. ABC Family marketed the series as "original programming", although earlier seasons had already aired in Canada. The show was pulled from the lineup early in its run due to poor ratings.

On March 7, 2008, it was announced that CBC ordered a second season of the show. The second season started broadcasting on October 1, 2008, and ended on March 23, 2009.

== Episodes ==
=== Series overview ===
Season	Episodes	Originally released	
Season	Episodes	First released	Last released
1	13	January 9, 2008	April 2, 2008
2	19	October 1, 2008	March 23, 2009

=== Season 1 (2008) ===
No. overall	No. in series	Title	Directed by	Written by	Original release date
1	1	"The Tornado"	Eric Tessier	Richard Blaimert	January 9, 2008
In one day, Sophie Parker's life goes from perfect to perfectly horrible when her boyfriend leaves her for her best friend — while Sophie's pregnant with their baby — and quits the talent agency they run together to launch his own competing firm. And to top it all off, she goes into labor — and discovers that the baby's father isn't who she thought it was.
2	2	"Sophie Comes Home"	Eric Tessier	Howard Nemetz	January 16, 2008
Sophie brings her new baby home from the hospital and introduces him to his grandmother.
3	3	"Groove Thing"	Eric Tessier	Shelley Scarrow	January 23, 2008
Sophie has to face her ex-clients when she attends the launch of Rick's new agency.
4	4	"Birth Control"	Eric Tessier	Karen Hill	January 30, 2008
Sophie starts getting her and her new baby's life in order until her mother steps in to help.
5	5	"Dr. Who"	Eric Tessier	Shelley Scarrow	February 6, 2008
Sophie goes on a blind date with Jesse Torres, a handsome gynecologist, but isn't sure she can deal with the fact that almost every woman she knows is a patient of his. Rick and Melissa get a dog, but Rick is put out when Melissa pays more attention to the dog than she does to him.
6	6	"Guess Who's Coming to Dinner"	Eric Tessier	James Hurst	February 13, 2008
Sparks fly when Sophie and Rick square off to woo a top name actress into their agencies.
7	7	"Checking Sophie Out"	Eric Tessier	Howard Nemetz, Howard Busgang	February 20, 2008
Sophie's mother and ex-con brother arrive to help out her talent agency.
8	8	"Ze Boy Next Door"	Eric Tessier	Cynthia Knight	February 27, 2008
Sophie and Matt come to odds when a sexy new neighbour moves in, and it's Rick and Melissa's anniversary.
9	9	"Mommy Dearest"	Eric Tessier	Dan Williams, Lienne Sawatsky	March 5, 2008
Judith fakes a suicide attempt to get Rick and Sophie back together.
10	10	"Single White Female"	Eric Tessier	James Hurst, Shelley Scarrow	March 12, 2008
Melissa secretly sets Sophie up on another date with Dr. Torres. Sophie offers Bridget an opportunity to work on Christian's reality show proposal.
11	11	"Door Number 2"	Eric Tessier	Cynthia Knight	March 19, 2008
Sophie has to choose whether to pursue her relationship with Dr. Torres or to get in touch with Andre (Robbie's father) to see if a relationship might develop with him. Matt has to choose whether to go to Switzerland to meet Verner's parents, or to pursue his attraction to Bernard, a waiter who constantly flirts with him when he and Sophie go out for coffee.
12	12	"Read the Signs"	Eric Tessier	James Hurst, Shelley Scarrow	March 26, 2008
Melissa and Estelle's futures depend on Sophie when they are both cast in roles of a lifetime, but Sophie just wants to spend time with baby Robbie. Guest: Mary Walsh
13	13	"Business Man"	Eric Tessier	James Hurst, Shelley Scarrow	April 2, 2008
In the season finale, a slumber party at Sophie's is about to push Judith, Estelle, Bridget, Matt, Ophelia, Melissa and Sophie all to the breaking point. Meanwhile, Rick prepares to pop the question. And to make matters more complicated, Andre has shown up...to see Sophie!

=== Season 2 (2008–09) ===
No. overall	No. in series	Title	Directed by	Written by	Original release date
14	1	"Sophie's Choice"	Eric Tessier	Shelley Scarrow	October 1, 2008
When Robbie's biological father meets his son for the first time, Sophie's world goes into a tailspin. Melissa is worried because Rick didn't come home.
15	2	"It's My Party"	Eric Tessier	Howard Busgang & Howard Nemetz	October 8, 2008
With Estelle and Melissa's movie about to open, Sophie tries to focus on the premiere party and not Andre. Rick is having "problems" in bed with Melissa.
16	3	"Between Rick and a Hard Place"	Eric Tessier	Paul Pogue	October 15, 2008
When Rick and Melissa break up, Rick questions whether he wants to be an agent, leaving a lot of clients open for the taking. Should Sophie be the one to take them?
17	4	"Robbing the Grave"	Eric Tessier	Emily Andras	October 22, 2008
Sophie meets the (almost) perfect guy. So what if he went to school with her mother? Judith throws a garden party to commemorate the anniversary of Robert's passing.
18	5	"The Casting Grouch"	Stefan Pleszczynski	Anita Kapila	October 29, 2008
Estelle has to beg for work from a casting agent she treated badly years ago. Ophelia moves out of her mother's place and into Judith's.
19	6	"Bad Back to the Future"	Stefan Pleszczynski	Julie Strassman-Cohn	November 5, 2008
Nothing can get in the way of Sophie and Victor's happiness, until a package from Andre arrives. The present for Robbie is nice, but what's in the letter for Sophie? Matt meets a hunky intern.
20	7	"The Lost Weekend"	Lyne Charlebois	Richard Blaimert & Pierre Samson	November 19, 2008
Sophie takes Judith on a "spiritual retreat" while Estelle baby-sits Robbie for the first time in her life.
21	8	"Who's Your Daddy"	Lyne Charlebois	Howard Busgang & Howard Nemetz	November 26, 2008
When Judith organizes an elaborate birthday party for Robbie, some very unexpected guests arrive. Rick gets the client of a lifetime.
22	9	"Bursting Balloons"	Michel Poulette	Anita Kapila & Shelly Scarrow	December 3, 2008
It’s Robbie’s first birthday, and all the gang is there, even his father Andre. Rick’s new star client Tiago is the hit of the party. Part 1 of 2.
23	10	"Trust or Bust"	Michel Poulette	Sherry White	January 5, 2009
Kim and Sophie square off over Andre. Tiago and Matt lead a double life. Part 2 of 2.
24	11	"An Outing With Sophie"	Stefan Pleszczynski	Paul Pogue	January 12, 2009
Sophie finds that she has way too many secrets to keep and is having trouble not spilling them. Rick moves out of his office, and into Sophie's.
25	12	"The Ex Beau Incident"	Stefan Pleszczynski	Cynthia Knight	January 19, 2009
When Rick invades Sophie's office, she takes him to an ex-beau party, hoping to match him up with a lover.
26	13	"Benched"	Lyne Charlebois	Katherine Schlemmer	January 26, 2009
Judith has an affair with the artist she hired to build her late husband's memorial bench. Matt gives Tiago an ultimatum, while Rick gets a fashion makeover from Bridget.
27	14	"You've Got Fe-Mail"	Lyne Charlebois	Matthew Cope	February 9, 2009
Matt drags Sophie on a party-binge after he breaks up with Tiago. She really likes it when the circus comes but then the bars hate her. When Sophie can't take the bars any more, she enlists the help of Nora, her new next-door neighbour. Estelle role-plays as a doctor at Matt's hospital.
28	15	"Burning Bridgets"	Michel Poulette	Anita Kapila	February 16, 2009
When Bridget goes to work for the evil Louise Brooks, Sophie has to hire a new assistant, fend off Louise's grab for all her clients and deal with Rick's chaos at the office. Estelle gets an ambitious new side-kick on the Miss Mobility set.
29	16	"Stolen Kisses"	Michel Poulette	Richard Blaimert & Pierre Samson	February 23, 2009
When Rick takes Sophie on a country outing to visit his Aunt Sheil, Sophie has to live up to a farm full of Rick's lies. Judith discovers a brand new vice while shopping with Robbie.
30	17	"Daddy Issues"	Stefan Pleszczynski	Howard Busgang & Howard Nemetz	March 9, 2009
When Melissa shows up pregnant, Sophie has to tell Rick that he may finally become the father he always wanted to be. Judith bribes Matt with expensive gifts, to buy his silence.
31	18	"Safety First"	Lyne Charlebois	Emer Connon & Shelly Scarrow	March 16, 2009
When Judith announces that she's off to India to do charity work, Sophie is convinced her mother has finally lost her mind and tries to scare some sense back into her. Bridget, now a Junior agent, finds the perfect role for Ophelia, but first she has to get around Estelle.
32	19	"Wedding Bell Blues"	Lyne Charlebois	Howard Busgang & Howard Nemetz	March 23, 2009
When Sophie accepts an invitation to Andre and Kim's wedding in New York, Rick and Matt tag along to protect her from herself. Estelle's Miss mobility contract is up for renewal.
