= Nouvelle adresse =

- Genre: Drama
- Created by: Richard Blaimert
- Written by: Richard Blaimert
- Country of origin: Canada
- Original language: French
- No. of seasons: 3
- No. of episodes: 34

Production
- Executive producers: Richard Blaimert; Jocelyn Deschênes
- Producer: Sophie Pellerin
- Production locations: Montreal, Quebec, Canada
- Cinematography: Richard Ciupka

Original release
- Network: Ici Radio-Canada Télé
- Release: 2014

Nouvelle adresse is a Canadian television drama series, which premiered in 2014 on Ici Radio-Canada Télé. Created by Richard Blaimert, the series focuses on Nathalie Lapointe (Macha Grenon), a single mother in her early forties whose terminal cancer diagnosis sends her on a quest to help her three teenage children get ready for the future.

The series was subsequently adapted into English as This Life, which premiered on CBC Television in 2015.

The series garnered 17 Gémeaux Award nominations in 2015, including nods as Best Drama Series, Best Actress in a Drama Series (Grenon), Best Supporting Actor in a Drama Series (Patrick Hivon, Antoine Pilon, Pierre Curzi), Best Supporting Actress in a Drama Series (Macha Limonchik, Muriel Dutil, Sophie Prégent) and Best Writing in a Drama Series (Blaimert).

== Cast ==
- Macha Grenon as Nathalie Lapointe
- Monia Chokri as Magalie Lapointe
- Patrick Hivon as Olivier Lapointe
- Pierre Curzi as Gérald Lapointe
- Jean-François Pichette as Laurent Lapointe
- Muriel Dutil as Janine Leduc Lapointe
- Mylène Dinh-Robic as Suki Bernier
- Anthony Lemke as Tom Severson
- Macha Limonchik as Danielle Bergeron
- Antoine Pilon as Émile Lapointe
- Sophie Prégent as Johanne Lemieux
- Myriam Poirier as Marilyn
