= Camion =

2012 film

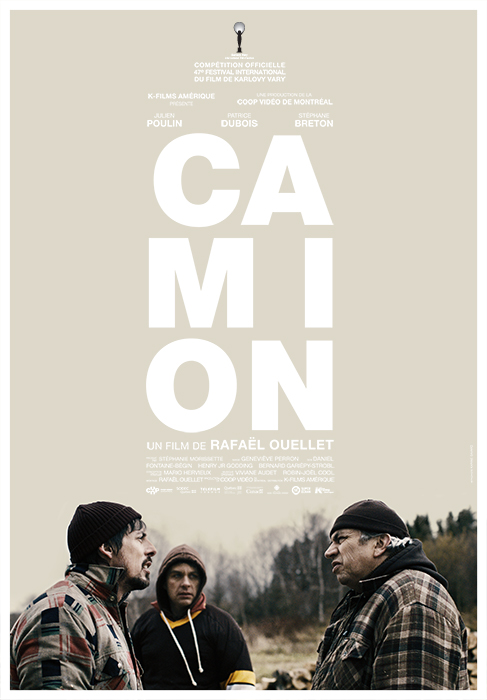
- Film poster
- Directed by: Rafaël Ouellet
- Written by: Rafaël Ouellet
- Produced by: Stéphanie Morissette
- Starring: Julien Poulin
- Cinematography: Geneviève Perron
- Edited by: Rafaël Ouellet
- Music by: Viviane Audet; Robin-Joël Cool; Éric West-Millette
- Production company: Coop Vidéo de Montréal
- Distributed by: K Films Amérique
- Release date: June 1, 2012 (Karlovy)
- Running time: 94 minutes
- Country: Canada
- Language: French

Camion is a 2012 Canadian drama film directed by Rafaël Ouellet. The film centres on a truck driver who is suffering from severe depression after a woman kills herself by crashing her car into his truck; although he was not at fault, the incident has left him suicidal, resulting in the mending of his strained relationships with his sons Sam (Patrice Dubois) and Alain (Stéphane Breton) after he reaches out to them for help.

== Cast ==
- Julien Poulin as Germain
- Patrice Dubois as Samuel
- Maude Giguère as Manu
- Jacob Tierney as Jacob
- Stéphane Breton as Alain
- Noémie Godin-Vigneau as Rebecca
- Cindy Sampson as Jade

== Release ==
The film was first released at the 47th Karlovy Vary International Film Festival, where it was nominated for the Crystal Globe, won the Award of the Ecumenical Jury and the Best Director Award for Ouellet.

== Awards ==
The film received eight Jutra Award nominations at the 15th Jutra Awards in 2013, winning two.

Award	Date of ceremony	Category	Recipient(s)	Result	Ref(s)
Jutra Awards	17 March 2013	Best Film	Marc Daigle	Nominated	
Jutra Awards	17 March 2013	Best Director	Rafaël Ouellet	Nominated	
Jutra Awards	17 March 2013	Best Screenplay	Rafaël Ouellet	Nominated	
Jutra Awards	17 March 2013	Best Actor	Julien Poulin	Won	
Jutra Awards	17 March 2013	Best Cinematography	Geneviève Perron	Nominated	
Jutra Awards	17 March 2013	Best Editing	Rafaël Ouellet	Nominated	
Jutra Awards	17 March 2013	Best Original Music	Viviane Audet, Robin-Joël Cool, Éric West-Millette	Won	
Jutra Awards	17 March 2013	Most Successful Film Outside Quebec	Rafaël Ouellet	Nominated	
Prix collégial du cinéma québécois	2013	Best Film	Camion	Nominated	
