= Age 17 =

- Film poster
- Italian: 17 anni
- Directed by: Filippo Demarchi
- Written by: Filippo Demarchi
- Produced by: Michela Pini; Amel Soudani
- Starring: Fabio Foiada; Ignazio Oliva; Laura Minazzi; Kevin Martinetti
- Cinematography: Patrick Tresch
- Edited by: Pierre Deschamps
- Production companies: Cinédokké; École cantonale d'art de Lausanne
- Release date: 1 November 2013 (Festival Tous Ecrans)
- Running time: 22 minutes
- Country: Switzerland
- Language: Italian

Age 17 (Italian: 17 anni) is a 2013 Swiss drama film written and directed by Filippo Demarchi.

The short film included in the DVD Boys On Film 12 – Confession.

== Synopsis ==
Matteo is a 17-year-old boy who comes to the realization that he is in love with Don Massimo, a young priest of the village that leads the marching band in which Matteo plays the drum. He sees in Massimo a person willing to listen to his fears and desires. For the first time in his life, Matteo feels ready to open up to someone.

== Cast ==
- Fabio Foiada as Matteo
- Ignazio Oliva as Don Massimo
- Laura Minazzi as Nadine
- Kevin Martinetti as Firat

== Participation in international festivals and awards ==
2013:

- Festival Tous Ecrans – 19th Geneva International Film Festival (Switzerland) – RTS award for Best International Short : acquisition
- Internationale Kurzfilmtage Winterthur (Switzerland)
- Festival du film de Vendôme (France)

2014:

- 18th Sofia International Film Festival (Bulgaria) – Swiss film Award, nomination best shortfilm 2014
- 26th European First Film Festival – Festival premier plans d'Angers (France)
- 32nd International Film Festival of Uruguay (Uruguay)
- Curta Cinema (Rio de Janeiro, Brazil)
- FreshWave, International Short Film Festival (Hong Kong) – International Association of Film and Television Schools (CILECT)
- Inside Out – Toronto LGBT Film Festival (Canada)
- Internationales Kurzfilm Festival Hamburg: IKFF (Germany)
- Merlinka Festival International Queer Film (Serbia)
- MWFF, Montreal World Film Festival (Canada)
- Palm Spring – ShortFest (USA)
- Schweizer Jugendfilmtage – Festival Ciné Jeunesse Suisse (Switzerland)
- Solothurner Filmtage – Journées de Soleure (Switzerland)
- Tel Aviv International Student Film Festival (Israel)
- Queer Lisboa 18 – International Queer Film Festival (Portugal)
- UK Film Festival, London

2015:

- 38 Festival du Film Court en Plein Air de Grenoble (France)
- FIPA, Festival International des Programmes Audiovisuels de Biarritz (France)
