= Les Hauts et les bas de Sophie Paquin =

- Also known as: The Highs and Lows of Sophie Paquin
- Created by: Richard Blaimert
- Starring: Suzanne Clément
- Country of origin: Canada
- Original language: French
- No. of seasons: 4
- No. of episodes: 45

Production
- Executive producers: Jocelyn Deschênes; Sophie Pellerin

Original release
- Network: Ici Radio-Canada Télé
- Release: September 19, 2006 – December 2009

Les Hauts et les bas de Sophie Paquin (The Highs and Lows of Sophie Paquin) is a Canadian television comedy-drama series, which premiered on Radio-Canada in 2006. The show stars Suzanne Clément as Sophie Paquin, a single mother and businesswoman who operates her own talent agency.

The cast also includes Éric Bernier, Élise Guilbault, Jean-Nicolas Verreault, Pauline Martin, Isabelle Vincent, Christiane Pasquier, Catherine De Léan, Danny Blanco Hall, François Létourneau and Anthony Lemke. The show was created by Richard Blaimert and its executive producer is Jocelyn Deschênes.

In 2008, CBC Television began airing an English-language adaptation, Sophie, which was also created by Blaimert and produced by Deschênes.
