= Virage (TV series) =

Virage is a Canadian television sports drama anthology series, which premiered in 2021 on Noovo. Each season focuses on a professional athlete who is at a major crossroads in life.

== Season one ==
The first season, premiering September 15, 2021, stars Charlotte Aubin as Frédérique Lessard, an Olympic medalist speed skater who is retiring from competitive sport and trying to figure out her next act in life, The supporting cast includes Émile Schneider, Marie-Thérèse Fortin, Sylvain Marcel, Juliette Gosselin, Anglesh Major, Mani Soleymanlou, Sandrine Bisson, Fanny Mallette and Audrey Roger.

The season was directed by Catherine Therrien, and written by Kim Lévesque-Lizotte, Marie-Hélène Lebeau-Taschereau and Louis Morissette.

== Season two ==
The second season, which premiered January 10, 2023, as Virage: double faute, stars Éric Bruneau as Charles Rivard, a tennis player in the twilight of his career who is drawn into a narcotics addiction in his desperate efforts to make one last return to form so that he can end his career in glory. Its supporting cast includes Morissette, Sylvie Léonard, Karl Farah, Lamia Benhacine and Magalie Rioux.

The season was written by Bruneau, Lévesque-Lizotte, Lebeau-Taschereau and Morissette, and directed by Rafaël Ouellet.
