= List of French films of 2018 =

A list of French-produced films scheduled for release in 2018.

== Films ==
| Title | Director | Cast | Notes |
|---|---|---|---|
| All About Mothers (La Fête des mères} | Marie-Castille Mention-Schaar | | |
| Ami ami | Victor Saint Macary | William Lebghil, Margot Bancilhon, Camille Razat | |
| Angel Face (Gueule d'ange) | Vanessa Filho | Marion Cotillard, Ayline Aksoy-Etaix, Alban Lenoir | |
| Black Forest (Forêt Noire) | Philippe David Gagné, Jean-Marc E. Roy | | |
| Brillantissime | Michèle Laroque | Michèle Laroque, Kad Merad, Rossy de Palma | |
| La Ch'tite famille | Dany Boon | Dany Boon, Line Renaud, Laurence Arne | |
| Climax | Gaspar Noé | Sofia Boutella, Romain Guillermic, Souheila Yacoub | |
| Eva | Benoît Jacquot | Gaspard Ulliel, Isabelle Huppert | |
| The Commuter | Jaume Collet-Serra | Liam Neeson, Vera Farmiga, Patrick Wilson | American-British-French co-production |
| A Faithful Man (L'Homme fidèle) | Louis Garrel | Louis Garrel, Laetitia Casta, Lily-Rose Depp, Joseph Engel | |
| High Life | Claire Denis | Robert Pattinson, Mia Goth, Juliette Binoche | British-French-German co-production |
| Lady J (Mademoiselle de Joncquières) | Emmanuel Mouret | Cécile de France, Édouard Baer, Alice Isaaz | |
| Non-Fiction | Olivier Assayas | Guillaume Canet, Juliette Binoche, Vincent Macaigne, Nora Hamzawi | |
| Normandie nue | Philippe Le Guay | François Cluzet, Toby Jones, Vincent Regan | |
| One Nation, One King | Pierre Schoeller | Gaspard Ulliel, Adèle Haenel, Louis Garrel, Céline Sallette, Laurent Lafitte | |
| Le Rire de ma mère | Colombe Savignac, Pascal Ralite | Suzanne Clément, Pascal Demolon, Sabrina Seyvecou | |
| School's Out (L'heure de la sortie) | Sébastien Marnier | Laurent Lafitte, Emmanuelle Bercot, Luàna Bajrami | |
| Taxi 5 | Franck Gastambide | Franck Gastambide, Malik Bentalha, Bernard Farcy | |
| Territory of Love | Romain Cogitore | Déborah François, Paul Hamy | French-Taiwanese co-production |
| To the Ends of the World | Guillaume Nicloux | Gaspard Ulliel, Guillaume Gouix, Gérard Depardieu | |
| White Fang | Alexandre Espigares | | French-Luxembourgian co-production |
