= Florence Lafond =

Canadian film director and screenwriter

Florence Lafond is a Canadian film director and screenwriter from Quebec, most noted for her 2023 short film Until You Die (Jusqu'à ce que tu meures).

A 2016 graduate of the Université du Québec à Montréal, she released her debut short film, Meute, in 2018.

Until You Die premiered in March 2023 at the Regard short film festival in Saguenay, Quebec. In 2024 it was a shortlisted finalist in the short film category at the Prix collégial du cinéma québécois, and earned Canadian Screen Award acting nominations for both of its primary cast members, Marine Johnson and Anthony Therrien, at the 12th Canadian Screen Awards.

She has also worked as writer and script supervisor on other film and television productions. Her debut feature film, tentatively titled Buenas noches mon amour, entered development in 2022.

Her 2025 short film No Matter the Weather (Beau temps, mauvais temps) won the award for Best Canadian Short Film at the 2026 Kingston Canadian Film Festival.
