= Jazz Infernal =

- Directed by: Will Niava
- Written by: Will Niava; Kristelle Laroche
- Produced by: Zion Lipstein-Saffer; Samuel Caron
- Starring: Ange Eric N'Guessan; Alexis Belhumeur; Kalombo Kasongo
- Cinematography: Harley Francis
- Edited by: Thomas Bellefleur; Will Niava; Joshua Rosenbaum
- Music by: Hichem Khalfa
- Production companies: Telescope Films; Productions Disamare; Scara-B
- Distributed by: Travelling Distribution
- Release date: September 4, 2025 (TIFF)
- Running time: 16 minutes
- Country: Canada
- Languages: French; English

Jazz Infernal is a Canadian short drama film, directed by Will Niava and released in 2025. A semi-autobiographical story set in Montreal, the film explores themes of immigration, grief, and family legacy through the lens of the city's jazz scene.

The film premiered at the 2025 Toronto International Film Festival (TIFF), where it was named to Canada's Top Ten for 2025. In January 2026, it won the Short Film Jury Award: International Fiction at the 2026 Sundance Film Festival.

In March 2026, the film was selected to open the Festival Regard in Saguenay, Quebec.

== Plot ==
Koffi (N'Guessan), a young trumpeter from Ivory Coast, arrives in Montreal on a freezing winter day. He carries the heavy burden of being the son of a legendary jazz musician—a legacy he initially tries to escape. His arrival is chaotic; he struggles with the cold, the language barrier, and the pressure of an aunt who berates him.

Alienated and lost, Koffi is swept into a surreal and intense night out with two strangers (Belhumeur and Kasongo) who drag him into the local underground jazz scene. The experience forces him to confront his grief, his roots, and his own artistic voice, culminating in an improvised performance that bridges his past and present.

== Cast ==
- Ange Eric N'Guessan as Koffi
- Alexis Belhumeur
- Kalombo Kasongo

== Production ==
=== Development ===
The film was directed by Will Niava, a Ghanaian-Ivorian filmmaker based in Montreal. It was produced by Zion Lipstein-Saffer and Samuel Caron (best known for the Academy Award-nominated short Invincible) through Telescope Films, in collaboration with Productions Disamare and Scarabee Films. Executive Produced by McCray Sutherlin and Muddy Water.

The project was originally conceived as a comedy focused on the "hilarious" confusion of the immigrant experience, inspired by Niava's own arrival in Canada. However, the creative direction shifted significantly during pre-production. Niava, who was processing the earlier loss of his father (a prominent interpreter who worked with figures such as Nelson Mandela), felt compelled to reframe the narrative. He pivoted the film from a lighthearted comedy into a "sacred exploration of grief," turning the project into a "love letter" to his late father.

=== Music ===
The film features original music by Montreal jazz trumpeter Hichem Khalfa. The score plays a central narrative role, described by critics as an "emotional language" that replaces dialogue in key moments. Niava, who does not play an instrument, worked closely with Khalfa to ensure the jazz felt "structured, but alive with improvisation."

== Themes ==
Critics have noted that Jazz Infernal subverts typical immigrant narratives by focusing on "remixing" identity rather than assimilating. A review in Afrocritik observed that the film portrays diaspora identity as "less about preservation and more about improvisation," mirroring the structure of jazz music itself. The film also tackles the pressure of "legacy," asking whether inheriting a famous parent's talent is a gift or a haunting.

== Reception ==
=== Festivals ===
Jazz Infernal had its world premiere in the Short Cuts program at the 2025 Toronto International Film Festival on September 4, 2025. It was subsequently named to TIFF's annual Canada's Top Ten list for 2025, which recognizes the best Canadian films of the year.

In January 2026, the film screened at the Sundance Film Festival, where it was awarded the Short Film Jury Award: International Fiction. The jury citation stated: "This film deeply resonates in a way that lingers long after viewing, powerfully blending evocative atmosphere, gorgeous cinematography, music, and global storytelling influences into a profoundly singular vision."

It was selected as the Opening Film for the 2026 Festival Regard in Saguenay, Quebec.

=== Awards ===
Award	Date of ceremony	Category	Recipient(s)	Result	Ref.
Sundance Film Festival	2026	Short Film Jury Award: International Fiction	Will Niava	Won	
Festival Regard	2026	Grand Prize	Will Niava	Pending	
