= Samuel Caron =

Canadian film producer

- Born: Montreal, Quebec
- Education: Université du Québec à Montréal (UQAM)
- Occupation: Film producer
- Years active: 2017–present
- Known for: Invincible; Jazz Infernal
- Awards: Prix Iris for Best Live Action Short Film (2023)
- Website: telescopefilms.ca

Samuel Caron is a Canadian film producer based in Montreal, Quebec. He is a co-founder of the production company Telescope Films. Caron is best known for producing the short film Invincible (2022), which was nominated for the Academy Award for Best Live Action Short Film at the 96th Academy Awards.

In 2026, his production Jazz Infernal won the Short Film Jury Award: International Fiction at the 2026 Sundance Film Festival.

== Education ==
Caron studied at the Université du Québec à Montréal (UQAM).

== Career ==
Caron began his career producing music videos for major international artists, including Celine Dion ("Courage"), Kygo, and Charlotte Cardin. In 2017, he co-founded the production company Telescope Films with director Vincent René-Lortie.

=== Invincible ===
In 2022, Caron produced the short drama Invincible, directed by Vincent René-Lortie. The film, which recounts the final 48 hours of a 14-year-old boy's life, received widespread critical acclaim. It won the Special Jury Prize at the Clermont-Ferrand International Short Film Festival and the Prix Iris for Best Live Action Short Film at the 25th Quebec Cinema Awards. In January 2024, the film received an Academy Award nomination.

=== Recent work ===
Caron continued his success in the short film circuit with Jazz Infernal (2025), directed by Will Niava. The film premiered at the 2025 Toronto International Film Festival and won a Jury Award at Sundance in 2026.

== Filmography ==
- La Volière - 2017
- Le déménagement - 2017
- Premier matin sans toi - 2018
- We Had It Coming - 2018
- American Dream - 2018
- Chez les heureux de ce monde - 2019
- Beast - 2019
- Quand elle tombe - 2019
- Take Me to a Nice Place - 2019
- Invincible - 2022
- Jazz Infernal - 2025
- A Dying Tree (La Peau de l'autre) - 2025
