= Until You Die =

2023 Canadian short film directed by Florence Lafond

- French: Jusqu'à ce que tu meures
- Directed by: Florence Lafond
- Written by: Florence Lafond
- Produced by: Mylène Corbeil
- Starring: Marine Johnson; Anthony Therrien
- Cinematography: Louis Turcotte
- Edited by: Marie-Pier Dupuis
- Music by: Marc-Antoine Barbier
- Production company: La Créative Films
- Distributed by: Travelling Distribution
- Release date: March 20, 2023 (Regard)
- Running time: 17 minutes
- Country: Canada
- Language: French

Until You Die (French: Jusqu'à ce que tu meures) is a Canadian short drama film, written and directed by Florence Lafond and released in 2023. The film stars Marine Johnson and Anthony Therrien as Léa and Xavier, a couple who have recently decided to maintain an open relationship, and centres on their conversation after Xavier returns home from his first time having sex with somebody else.

The film premiered in March 2023 at the Regard short film festival in Saguenay, Quebec.

Johnson and Therrien both received Canadian Screen Award nominations for Best Performance in a Live Action Short Drama at the 12th Canadian Screen Awards, and the film was a shortlisted finalist in the short film category at the Prix collégial du cinéma québécois.
