= 2020 Cinéfest Sudbury International Film Festival =

- Opening film: Percy
- Closing film: The Father
- Location: Sudbury, Ontario, Canada
- Founded: 1989
- Festival date: September 19–27, 2020
- Website: cinefest.com

Cinéfest Sudbury International Film Festival
- 2021 2019

The 2020 edition of the Cinéfest Sudbury International Film Festival, the 32nd edition in the event's history, was held from September 19 to 27, 2020 in Sudbury, Ontario, Canada.

Due to the ongoing COVID-19 pandemic in Canada, organizers announced that the 2020 Cinéfest would proceed with a mix of in-person and online screenings, similarly to the 2020 Toronto International Film Festival. The festival also programmed a smaller lineup than it had in recent years, with 55 feature films.

== Awards ==
Award	Film	Filmmaker	Ref
Audience Choice, Live Screening	The Father	Florian Zeller	
Audience Choice, Virtual Platform	The Last Vermeer	Dan Friedkin	
Audience Choice, Documentary	Call Me Human (Je m'appelle humain)	Kim O'Bomsawin	
Audience Choice, Documentary Runner-Up	Chaakapesh	Roger Frappier, Justin Kingsley	
Audience Choice, Short Film	Cayenne	Simon Gionet	
Audience Choice, Short Film Runner-Up	Zoo	Will Niava	

== Official selections ==
=== Gala Presentations ===
English title	Original title	Director(s)	Production country
Ammonite		Francis Lee	United Kingdom, Australia
Girl		Chad Faust	Canada, United States
My Salinger Year		Philippe Falardeau	Canada
Nadia, Butterfly		Pascal Plante	Canada
The Nest		Sean Durkin	Canada, United Kingdom, United States
Nine Days		Edson Oda	United States
Percy		Clark Johnson	Canada, United States
The Rose Maker	La fine fleur	Pierre Pinaud	France

=== Special Presentations ===
English title	Original title	Director(s)	Production country
Akilla's Escape		Charles Officer	Canada
Another Round	Druk	Thomas Vinterberg	Denmark, Netherlands, Sweden
Body and Bones		Melanie Oates	Canada
Falling		Viggo Mortensen	Canada, United Kingdom
The Father		Florian Zeller	France, United Kingdom
Games People Play	Seurapeli	Jenni Toivoniemi	Finland
I Am Greta		Nathan Grossman	Sweden, United Kingdom, United States, Germany
Laughter	Le Rire	Martin Laroche	Canada
Mogul Mowgli		Bassam Tariq	United Kingdom, United States
The Pack	Smecka	Tomas Polensky	Czech Republic, Slovakia, Latvia
Spare Parts		Andrew Thomas Hunt	Canada
Trickster		Michelle Latimer	Canada
Undine		Christian Petzold	Germany, France
Wander		April Mullen	Canada, United States

=== Features Canada ===
English title	Original title	Director(s)	Production country
Bone Cage		Taylor Olson	Canada
Events Transpiring Before, During and After a High School Basketball Game		Ted Stenson	Canada
For the Sake of Vicious		Gabriel Carrer, Reese Eveneshen	Canada
Happy Place		Helen Shaver	Canada
Hazy Little Thing		Sam Coyle	Canada
Our Own	Les Nôtres	Jeanne Leblanc	Canada
Québexit		Joshua Demers	Canada
Queen of the Morning Calm		Gloria Ui Young Kim	Canada
Reservoir	Réservoir	Kim St-Pierre	Canada
Saint-Narcisse		Bruce La Bruce	Canada
The Winter Lake		Phil Sheerin	Canada, Ireland

=== Cana-Doc ===
English title	Original title	Director(s)	Production country
Eddy's Kingdom		Greg Crompton	Canada
The Forbidden Reel		Ariel Nasr	Canada
Keyboard Fantasies: The Beverly Glenn-Copeland Story		Posy Dixon	Canada, United Kingdom
Sisterhood	Ainsi soient-elles	Maxime Faure	Canada

=== Cinema Indigenized ===
English title	Original title	Director(s)	Production country
The Arctics		Naomi Mark, Marty O'Brien	Canada
Call Me Human	Je m'appelle humain	Kim O'Bomsawin	Canada
Chaakapesh		Roger Frappier, Justin Kingsley	Canada
Parallel Minds		Benjamin Ross Hayden	Canada

=== World Cinema ===
English title	Original title	Director(s)	Production country
Abe		Fernando Grostein Andrade	Brazil, United States
Black Bear		Lawrence Michael Levine	United States
Call Mom!	Ring mamma!	Lisa Aschan	Sweden
Digger		Georgis Grigorakis	Greece
How to Be a Good Wife	La bonne épouse	Martin Provost	France
The Last Vermeer		Dan Friedkin	United States
My Dog Stupid	Mon chien Stupide	Yvan Attal	France
Two of Us	Deux	Filippo Meneghetti	France

=== World Doc ===
English title	Original title	Director(s)	Production country
The Human Factor		Dror Moreh	Israel, United States
The Truffle Hunters		Michael Dweck, Gregory Kershaw	Greece, Italy, United States

=== Stir Crazy Late Night Frights ===
English title	Original title	Director(s)	Production country
Possessor		Brandon Cronenberg	Canada, United Kingdom

=== First Cut ===
English title	Original title	Director(s)	Production country
Perspective		B. P. Paquette	Canada

=== Audience Choices from Around the World ===
English title	Original title	Director(s)	Production country
Girl with No Mouth	Peri: Ağzı Olmayan Kız	Can Evrenol	Turkey
Lucky Grandma		Sasie Sealy	United States
Radioactive		Marjane Satrapi	United Kingdom

=== Short Circuit ===
English title	Original title	Director(s)	Production country
A Birthday	Un jour de fête	Philippe Arsenault	Canada
A Broken Hearted Solstice	Solstice d'un cœur brisé	Fanny Lefort	Canada
All-In Madonna		Arnold Lim	Canada
Anna		Dekel Berenson	United Kingdom
Audionomie		Maximillien Rolland	Canada
BKS	SDR	Alexa-Jeanne Dubé	Canada
Cayenne		Simon Gionet	Canada
Drifting		Hanxiong Bo	China
Goodbye Golovin		Mathieu Grimard	Canada
The House Abandon		Clint D'Souza	Canada
I Am in the World as Free and Slender as a Deer on a Plain		Sofia Banzhaf	Canada
Landgraves		Jean-François Leblanc	Canada
Red Balloon		Avi Federgreen	Canada
Shooting Star	Comme une cométe	Ariane Louis-Seize	Canada
Single		Ashley Eakin	United States
Sleeping Longing	Dormir désir	Virginie Nolin	Canada
Veil		Zahra Golafshani	Canada
Zoo		Will Niava	Canada
