= Someone's Trying to Get In =

2024 Canadian short film directed by Colin Nixon

- Directed by: Colin Nixon
- Written by: Colin Nixon
- Produced by: Rosalie Chicoine Perreault
- Starring: Ralph Prosper
- Cinematography: Simran Dewan
- Edited by: Philippe Lefebvre
- Music by: Ilyaa Ghafouri
- Production company: Bravo Charlie
- Distributed by: H264 Distribution
- Release date: February 10, 2024 (SBIFF)
- Running time: 24 minutes
- Country: Canada
- Languages: English; French; Haitian Creole

Someone's Trying to Get In is a Canadian short drama film, written and directed by Colin Nixon and released in 2024. The film stars Ralph Prosper as Bertrand, an asylum seeker from Haiti who is desperate to escape from the Canadian refugee camp where he has been interned pending his immigration hearing, after rumours of mass deportations begin to sweep the camp.

The cast also includes Nisha Coleman, Tyler Epassy, Vanina Epassy and Alastor Vael.

The film premiered in February 2024 at the 39th Santa Barbara International Film Festival, and had its Canadian premiere in March at the Regard short film festival.

== Awards ==
Award	Year	Category	Recipient	Result	Ref.
Torino Film Festival	2024	Short Film Competition	Colin Nixon	Honored	
Knowlton Film Festival	2024	Best Regional Film	Colin Nixon	Won	
Canadian Screen Awards	2025	Best Performance in a Live Action Short Drama	Ralph Prosper	Nominated	
