= Zoo (2019 film) =

2019 Canadian short drama film

- Directed by: Will Niava
- Written by: Will Niava; Anthony Galati
- Produced by: Alleck Doxer
- Starring: Amos Nzamba; Brendan Sheehan; Ian Contreras; Ian Cloutier
- Cinematography: Simran Dewan
- Edited by: Will Niava
- Release date: February 4, 2019 (Clermont-Ferrand)
- Running time: 12 minutes
- Country: Canada
- Language: English

Zoo is a 2019 Canadian short drama film directed and co-written by Will Niava. The film explores themes of police brutality, racial profiling, and power dynamics through the story of three young men whose night out takes a violent turn.

The film premiered at the Clermont-Ferrand International Short Film Festival in 2019. It later gained significant attention for its prescient depiction of racial conflict shortly before the global George Floyd protests, eventually being selected for the Criterion Collection.

== Plot ==
Amos (Amos Nzamba), Slim (Brendan Sheehan), and Santos (Ian Contreras) are three misfits drifting through the suburbs of Montreal on a restless night. Bored and looking for trouble, they engage in petty theft and wander aimlessly. Their night takes a dark turn when they stop at a convenience store parking lot and encounter a troubled older man (Ian Cloutier). What begins as a minor misunderstanding between the youths and the man quickly escalates into a physical confrontation. The situation spirals out of control when it is revealed that the man is an off-duty police officer, shifting the power dynamic and leading to a violent climax that exposes the fragility of the boys' freedom.

== Cast ==
- Amos Nzamba as Amos, a quiet but intense young man who serves as the film's emotional anchor.
- Brendan Sheehan as Slim, a reckless member of the trio.
- Ian Contreras as Santos, the third member of the group.
- Ian Cloutier as Alec, a troubled off-duty police officer.

== Production ==
=== Development ===
Niava developed the script with co-writer Anthony Galati. The story was inspired by Niava's own experiences with authority figures in Ghana and Canada. He originally intended the project to be a music video but expanded it into a narrative short after securing funding.

=== Casting ===
Niava used a "street casting" approach for the film. He discovered lead actor Amos Nzamba, who had no prior acting experience, and cast him for his "calm force." Brendan Sheehan (Slim) was spotted by Niava in a convenience store wearing an all-white outfit with pink hair, which Niava felt immediately fit the character.

=== Cinematography ===
The film was shot by cinematographer Simran Dewan. The visual style relies on kinetic, handheld camera work and available light—often neon signs and streetlights—to create a gritty, realistic atmosphere.

== Reception ==
=== Critical response ===
Zoo received positive reviews from film critics. Indie Shorts Mag praised the film's refusal to offer easy answers, noting that "in Niava's Zoo, there is no black-and-white, only grey." Film Threat commended the director's control of tone, stating that Niava "nails the tone right from start to finish."

The film was notably acquired by the Criterion Channel in 2021, where it was programmed alongside Michael Haneke's Code Unknown as a study on alienation and authority.

=== Awards ===
The film screened at numerous festivals, including the Regard festival in Quebec. It was a runner-up for the Audience Choice Award at the 2020 Cinéfest Sudbury International Film Festival.
