= Maurice (2015 film) =

2015 Canadian film directed by François Jaros

- Directed by: François Jaros
- Written by: François Jaros; Marie-Eve Leclerc-Dion
- Produced by: Fanny-Laure Malo; François Jaros
- Starring: Richard Fréchette
- Cinematography: Olivier Gossot
- Edited by: Michel Arcand
- Music by: Philippe Leduc
- Production company: La Boîte à Fanny
- Release date: March 13, 2015 (Regard)
- Running time: 14 minutes
- Country: Canada
- Language: French

Maurice is a Canadian short drama film, directed by François Jaros and released in 2015. The film stars Richard Fréchette as Maurice, a man with amyotrophic lateral sclerosis who is making his final preparations before his planned death by assisted suicide.

The cast also includes Andrée Cousineau, Yves Jacques, François Lambert, Pierre Lenoir, Alice Pascual and Fred-Eric Salvail.

The film premiered in March 2015 at the Regard short film festival in Saguenay, Quebec. It was subsequently screened at the Fantasia International Film Festival, where it won the Cheval noir for best short film.

The film won the Jutra Award for Best Live Action Short Film at the 18th Jutra Awards in 2016.
