= A Dying Tree =

2025 Canadian short film directed by Vincent René-Lortie

- French: La Peau de l'autre
- Directed by: Vincent René-Lortie
- Written by: Charles-Alexis Desgagnés
- Produced by: Samuel Caron
- Starring: Charles-Alexis Desgagnés; Vincent René-Lortie
- Cinematography: Alexandre Nour
- Edited by: Thomas Bellefleur
- Music by: Wilhelm Brandl
- Production company: Metafilms
- Distributed by: Travelling Distribution
- Release date: February 21, 2025 (Slamdance)
- Running time: 17 minutes
- Country: Canada

A Dying Tree (French: La Peau de l'autre, lit, "The Skin of the Other") is a Canadian experimental short drama film, directed by Vincent René-Lortie and released in 2025. The film stars Charles-Alexis Desgagnés as a middle-aged office worker who makes an irreversible decision after unexpectedly meeting the gaze of a chimpanzee during his commute on the metro.

The film premiered at the 2025 Slamdance Film Festival, followed by its Canadian premiere at the Regard short film festival.

== Awards ==
Award	Date of ceremony	Category	Recipient	Result	Ref.
Canadian Screen Awards	2026	Best Performance in a Live Action Short Drama	Charles-Alexis Desgagnés	Nominated	
Festival international du cinéma francophone en Acadie	2025	Best Canadian Short Film	Vincent René-Lortie	Won	
