= Canadian Screen Award for Best Performance in a Live Action Short Drama =

Annual Canadian film award

- Country: Canada
- Presented by: Academy of Canadian Cinema & Television
- First award: 2023
- Currently held by: Fiona Fu for Year of the Dragon (2025)
- Website: academy.ca/awards

The Canadian Screen Award for Best Performance in a Live Action Short Film is an annual award, presented by the Academy of Canadian Cinema and Television as part of the Canadian Screen Awards program, to honour the best leading performance in a short film.

The award was presented for the first time in 2024.

== 2020s ==
Year	Actor	Film	Ref
2023; 12th Canadian Screen Awards
2023; 12th Canadian Screen Awards	Behtash Fazlali	Motherland	
2023; 12th Canadian Screen Awards	Léokim Beaumier-Lépine	Invincible	
2023; 12th Canadian Screen Awards	Florence Blain Mbaye	Making Babies (Faire un enfant)	
2023; 12th Canadian Screen Awards	Eric K. Boulianne	Making Babies (Faire un enfant)	
2023; 12th Canadian Screen Awards	Marine Johnson	Until You Die (Jusqu’à ce que tu meures)	
2023; 12th Canadian Screen Awards	Agathe Ledoux	Heat Spell (L'Été des chaleurs)	
2023; 12th Canadian Screen Awards	Ilyes Tarmasti	Muscat	
2023; 12th Canadian Screen Awards	Anthony Therrien	Until You Die (Jusqu’à ce que tu meures)	
2024; 13th Canadian Screen Awards
2024; 13th Canadian Screen Awards	Bryn McAuley	Bibi's Dog Is Dead	
2024; 13th Canadian Screen Awards	Ali Eldurssi	Hatch	
2024; 13th Canadian Screen Awards	Tara Hakim	I Never Promised You a Jasmine Garden	
2024; 13th Canadian Screen Awards	Laura Luu	The Little Shopping Trolley (Le petit panier à roulettes)	
2024; 13th Canadian Screen Awards	Lío Mehiel	Are You Scared to Be Yourself Because You Think That You Might Fail?	
2024; 13th Canadian Screen Awards	Zoë Peak	On a Sunday at Eleven	
2024; 13th Canadian Screen Awards	Ralph Prosper	Someone's Trying to Get In	
2024; 13th Canadian Screen Awards	Ayo Tsalithaba	Gender Reveal	
2025; 14th Canadian Screen Awards
2025; 14th Canadian Screen Awards	Fiona Fu	Year of the Dragon	
2025; 14th Canadian Screen Awards	Sumathy Balaram	Karupy	
2025; 14th Canadian Screen Awards	Charles-Alexis Desgagnés	A Dying Tree (La Peau de l'autre)	
2025; 14th Canadian Screen Awards	Siobhan Connors	Headcase	
2025; 14th Canadian Screen Awards	Noam Desbiens-Lépine	Himalia	
2025; 14th Canadian Screen Awards	Jamie Thomas King	The Light Before the Sun	
2025; 14th Canadian Screen Awards	Lee Lawson	Thin Walls	
2025; 14th Canadian Screen Awards	Hannan Younis	Halfway Haunted	
