= Ralph Prosper =

Ralph Prosper is a Canadian actor from Quebec, best known for his regular role as police reception clerk François Asselin in the television series District 31.

He received a Canadian Screen Award nomination for Best Performance in a Live Action Short Drama at the 13th Canadian Screen Awards in 2025, for the film Someone's Trying to Get In.

== Filmography ==
=== Film ===
- The Wild - 2002
- Enemy Combatant - 2009
- Exit 67 (Sortie 67) - 2010
- Trash (Décharge) - 2011
- Exile (Exil) - 2012
- War Witch (Rebelle) - 2012
- White House Down - 2013
- Noir - 2015
- Dear Mr. President - 2016
- Eye on Juliet - 2017
- Maz - 2018
- My Very Own Circus (Mon cirque à moi) - 2020
- A Revision (Une révision) - 2021
- See You Garbage! (Au plaisir les ordures!) - 2021
- In Your Palm (En ta paume) - 2021
- Invincible - 2022
- Ru - 2023
- Someone's Trying to Get In - 2024
- The Last Meal (Le Dernier repas) - 2024
- A Christmas Storm (Le Cyclone de Noël) - 2024
- French Girl - 2024

=== Television ===
- A Life Interrupted - 2007
- Sophie - 2008, one episode
- Final Verdict - 2009
- Out of Control - 2009
- Blue Mountain State - 2010, one episode
- District 31 - 2016-22, 160 episodes
- Prémonitions - 2016, four episodes
- Blue Moon - 2018, one episode
- The Bold Type - 2020, two episodes
- En tout cas - 2020, one episode
- Chaos - 2021, five episodes
- Aller simple - 2022, one episode
- Alertes - 2022, four episodes
- Mea Culpa - 2025
