= Fiona Fu =

Chinese-Canadian actress

Fiona Fu is a Chinese-Canadian actress. She is most noted for her performance in the 2025 short film Year of the Dragon, for which she won the Canadian Screen Award for Best Performance in a Live Action Short Drama at the 14th Canadian Screen Awards in 2026.

A native of China, she began her career as a journalist for China Central Television before emigrating to Canada, where she has continued as a host and journalist for OMNI Television as well as taking acting roles. She first became known as one of the main stars of the drama series Blood and Water in 2015.

== Filmography ==
=== Film ===
- Power Rangers - 2017
- Tigertail - 2020
- Float - 2023
- Year of the Dragon - 2025
- Lucky Lu - 2025
- Dear Stranger - 2025
- Rock Springs - 2026

=== Television ===
- Blood and Water - 2015–21
- Away - 2020
- Kung Fu - 2021
