= Motherland (2023 Canadian film) =

2023 Canadian short film directed by Jasmin Mozaffari

- Directed by: Jasmin Mozaffari
- Written by: Jasmin Mozaffari
- Produced by: Priscilla Galvez; Caitlin Grabham
- Starring: Behtash Fazlali
- Cinematography: Farhad Ghaderi
- Edited by: Alexander Farah
- Production companies: Prowler Film; Silent Tower; Fela
- Release date: September 12, 2023 (TIFF)
- Running time: 24 minutes
- Country: Canada
- Languages: English; Persian

Motherland is a 2023 Canadian short drama film, written and directed by Jasmin Mozaffari. The film stars Behtash Fazlali as Babak, an Iranian immigrant to the United States during the Iran hostage crisis in the 1970s, who must confront anti-Iranian prejudice when he meets his girlfriend's parents for the first time.

The cast also includes Oriana Leman, John Ralston, Niaz Salimi, Birgitte Solem, Kevin Owen Clarke, Piret Jõgeda and Kiera Osborne.

The film screened in the Short Cuts program at the 2023 Toronto International Film Festival, where it was the winner of the Best Canadian Short Film award.

The film was later named to TIFF's annual Canada's Top Ten list for 2023. The film won the Canadian Screen Award for Best Live Action Short Drama, and Fazlali won the award for Best Performance in a Live Action Short Drama, at the 12th Canadian Screen Awards in 2024.
