= Olivier Gossot =

Olivier Gossot is a Canadian cinematographer based in Montreal, Quebec. He is most noted for his work on the 2025 film Peak Everything (Amour Apocalypse), for which he received a Quebec Cinema Award nomination for Best Cinematography at the 27th Quebec Cinema Awards.

== Filmography ==
- Life's a Bitch (Toutes des connes) - 2013
- Blue Thunder (Bleu tonnerre) - 2015
- Maurice - 2015
- Oh What a Wonderful Feeling - 2016
- Crème de menthe - 2017
- Fauve - 2018
- Mahalia Melts in the Rain - 2018
- Black Forest (Forêt noire) - 2018
- Young Juliette (Jeune Juliette) - 2019
- Mothers and Monsters - 2023
- Lucy Grizzli Sophie - 2024
- Peak Everything (Amour Apocalypse) - 2025
- Paradise - 2026
