= Paradise (2026 film) =

- Directed by: Jérémy Comte
- Screenplay by: Jérémy Comte; Will Niava
- Produced by: Tim Ringuette; Anne-Marie Gélinas; Fabien Westerhoff
- Starring: Daniel Atsu Hukporti; Joey Boivin-Desmeules; Évelyne de la Chenelière
- Cinematography: Olivier Gossot
- Edited by: Jérémy Comte
- Music by: Valentin Hadjadj
- Production companies: Entract Films; EMAFilms; Constellation Productions
- Distributed by: Elevation Pictures; Tandem Films; Global Constellation
- Release date: 14 February 2026 (Berlin)
- Running time: 90 minutes
- Countries: Canada; France; Ghana
- Languages: English; French

Paradise is a Canadian drama film, directed by Jérémy Comte and released in 2026. It stars Daniel Atsu Hukporti and Joey Boivin-Desmeules as Kojo and Tony, two young men – Kojo from Ghana and Tony from Montreal – who are brought together by their respective searches for information about their absent fathers.

The film had its world premiere at the Panorama section of the 76th Berlin International Film Festival on 14 February 2026.

== Cast ==
- Daniel Atsu Hukporti as Kojo
- Joey Boivin-Desmeules as Tony
- Évelyne de la Chenelière as Chantal

== Production ==
The film was shot in fall 2024, in both Quebec and Ghana. Its screenplay was co-written by Comte and Will Niava.

== Distribution ==
The film premiered at the 76th Berlin International Film Festival on 14 February 2026.

It has been acquired for commercial distribution by Elevation Pictures in Canada, Tandem Films in France, and Quiver Distribution in America.
