= Chloé Djandji =

Canadian actress

Chloé Djandji is a Canadian child actress. She is most noted for her performance in the film Ru, for which she received a Prix Iris nomination for Revelation of the Year at the 26th Quebec Cinema Awards.

In 2024 she appeared in the short film The Little Shopping Trolley (Le petit panier à roulettes).
