= Ru (novel) =

2009 novel by Kim Thúy

- First edition (French)
- Author: Kim Thúy
- Translator: Sheila Fischman
- Language: French
- Genre: Migrant literature, autobiographical fiction, littérature Québecois
- Published: 2009 (Libre Expression)
- Publication place: Quebec, Canada
- Media type: Print (hardback & paperback)
- Pages: 152
- ISBN: 978-1-4000-3430-7

Ru is a novel by Vietnamese-born Canadian novelist Kim Thúy, first published in French in 2009 by Montreal publisher Libre Expression. It was translated into English in 2012 by Sheila Fischman and published by Vintage Canada.

Ru, a film adaptation of the novel, was directed by Charles-Olivier Michaud and released in 2023.

== Plot summary ==
The novel tells the tale of a woman, An Tinh Nguyen, born in Saigon in 1968 during the Tet Offensive who immigrates to Canada with her family as a child.

The book switches between her childhood in Vietnam where she was born into a large and wealthy family, her time as a boat person when she left her country for a refugee camp in Malaysia, and her life as an early immigrant in Granby, Quebec. The story is told through a first-person narrative.

== Title ==
The word "ru" has significance in both French and Vietnamese. In French, the word means stream or flow of money, tears or blood. In Vietnamese, the word means cradle or lullaby.

== About ==
Kim Thúy wrote the book in honor of the people who welcomed her and her family into their life when they first arrived. The themes of war, migration, and resettlement reoccur throughout the novel.

== Style ==
Ru reads like an autobiography but is written as the fictional tale of migrant experiences. The style of the book has been described as being an auto-fiction.

The book tells the story of the first wave of Boat People who fled Vietnam between 1977 and 1979 and the trauma they lived through, taking the reader on their journey. It is estimated that more than 200,000 boat people fled, many of which drowned.

The novel is written in 144 unnumbered vignettes, that share the memories of the protagonist in three completely different environments: Her childhood home in Vietnam, a refugee camp in Malaysia, and the town of Granby in Quebec, Canada. The style of writing resembles memories shared by the narrator, which are woven together to create a narrative.

The characters included in the novel are the narrator's family members, both immediate and extended, as well as friends and individuals whom she encountered along her journey. Consistent with practice in Vietnamese families, the family members of the narrator are not given names, but instead referred to by birth order. By having nameless characters, the author depersonalizes them and leaves room for interpretation.

== Awards and nominations ==
The original French edition of the novel was selected for the 2014 edition of Le Combat des livres, where it was defended by author and physician Jean-François Chicoine. Its English translation was selected for the 2015 edition of Canada Reads by film critic and Toronto International Film Festival programmer Cameron Bailey, and won the competition on March 19, 2015.

The English edition, translated by Sheila Fischman, was published in 2012 by Random House Canada and was a shortlisted nominee for the 2012 Scotiabank Giller Prize, the 2012 Governor General's Award for French to English translation, and the 2013 Amazon.ca First Novel Award.

- Winner 2015 – Canada Reads
- Winner 2011 – Grand Prix littéraire Archambault
- Winner 2011 – Mondello Prize for Multiculturalism
- Winner 2010 – Prix du Grand Public Salon du livre––Essai/Livre pratique
- Winner 2010 – Governor General's Award for Fiction (French-language)
- Winner 2010 – Grand Prix RTL-Lire at the Salon du livre de Paris

== Reception ==
Kim Thúy lives and works in Canada. However, the audience, discourse, and geographical locations in Ru are taken beyond the borders of Canada. The book has been published in Canada, both in English and French, as well as eighteen other countries.

In an interview, Thúy describes the different perspective readers have depended on where they are from. She gives the example of people in Romania focusing on the communist regime described in the book, while people in France focused on the structure and the language used in the book.

The book has been seen as controversial, especially in Vietnam where the author describes the communist history as still being recent and a sensitive topic. Thúy discusses the fact that the history of the Boat People has not yet become part of Vietnam history. The novel Ru does not portray the communists in a completely negative perspective, which Thúy claims has caused controversy as a portion of the Vietnamese population blame them for the hardships their families endured.

== Adaptation ==
The novel was adapted into a 2023 film from Charles-Olivier Michaud that premiered at the 2023 Toronto International Film Festival.
