= Karupy =

2025 Canadian short film directed by Kalainithan Kalaichelvan

- Directed by: Kalainithan Kalaichelvan
- Written by: Kalainithan Kalaichelvan
- Produced by: Shaista Roshan; Alison Almeida
- Starring: Sumathy Balaram
- Cinematography: Shady Hanna
- Edited by: Jake Lee
- Music by: Kalaisan Kalaichelvan
- Production company: Canadian Film Centre
- Release date: September 9, 2025 (TIFF)
- Running time: 12 minutes
- Country: Canada
- Languages: English; Tamil

Karupy is a Canadian short drama film, directed by Kalainithan Kalaichelvan and released in 2025. The film stars Sumathy Balaram as Karupy, the matriarch of a Tamil Canadian immigrant family who unexpectedly announces at her 65th birthday party that she is ready to die and intends to commit suicide that evening, setting off a chain reaction in the family dynamics as her family respond in various ways to the announcement.

The cast also includes Ranjith Joseph, Smrithi Dhanasekar, UnniKannan S S, Arrthami Siva-Kuruvinth and Umeash Siva.

The film was made as Kalaichelvan's student project while studying at the Canadian Film Centre. It had its genesis when he overheard his grandfather saying that he was simply waiting around to die, leading him to write a story that explored Tamil culture's ambivalent relationship with expressing difficult emotions around subjects such as death.

The film premiered in the Short Cuts program at the 2025 Toronto International Film Festival.

== Awards ==
Award	Date of ceremony	Category	Recipient	Result	Ref.
Canadian Screen Awards	2026	Best Live Action Short Drama	Kalainithan Kalaichelvan, Shaista Roshan, Alison Almeida	Nominated	
Canadian Screen Awards	2026	Best Performance in a Live Action Short Drama	Sumathy Balaram	Nominated	
Toronto Reel Asian International Film Festival	2025	Outstanding Performer in a Canadian Short Film	Sumathy Balaram	Won	
Canadian Screen Music Awards	2026	Best Original Score for a Short Film	Kalaisan Kalaichelvan	Pending	
