= Stone Makers =

- French: Carrière
- Directed by: Jean-Marc E. Roy
- Written by: Jean-Marc E. Roy
- Produced by: Denis McCready; Colette Loumède; Claudia Chabot
- Cinematography: Vincent Biron
- Edited by: Stéphane Lafleur
- Production company: National Film Board of Canada
- Release date: 2016
- Running time: 5 minutes
- Country: Canada

Stone Makers (French: Carrière) is a Canadian short documentary film, directed by Jean-Marc E. Roy and released in 2016. Created as part of the National Film Board of Canada's 5 Shorts Project, the film depicts workers at a quarry in Saguenay, Quebec, allowing the sound of the machines to create a sort of "industrial symphony".

The film was shot with a monochrome Digital Bolex.

The film was a shortlisted Canadian Screen Award finalist for Best Short Documentary Film at the 5th Canadian Screen Awards.
