= Blood and Water (Canadian TV series) =

- Genre: Crime Drama
- Written by: Dan Trotta; Al Kratina
- Directed by: John L'Écuyer
- Starring: Simu Liu; Loretta Yu; Elfina Luk; Steph Song; Fiona Fu; Osric Chau; Peter Outerbridge; Selena Lee
- Composers: Richard Pell; Isabelle Noel; Ian LeFeuvre
- Country of origin: Canada
- Original languages: English; Cantonese; Mandarin
- No. of seasons: 3
- No. of episodes: 32

Production
- Running time: 24 minutes
- Production company: Breakthrough Entertainment

Original release
- Network: Omni Television
- Release: November 8, 2015 – present

Blood and Water (simplified Chinese: 血与水; traditional Chinese: 血與水; pinyin: Xuè Yǔ Shuǐ) is a Canadian television crime drama series, which premiered on OMNI Television in November 2015. The first television drama series produced for a Chinese Canadian audience, the show mixes dialogue in English, Cantonese and Mandarin.

== Plot overview ==
In the first season, set in Vancouver, British Columbia, ambitious police detective Josephine Bradley (Steph Song) has been brought in to investigate the murder of Charlie Xie (Osric Chau), the son of billionaire real estate developer Li-Rong "Ron" Xie, despite Josephine having just been diagnosed with cancer. However, the privileged and wealthy Xie family will do everything they can to stop Jo from uncovering the family's long held secrets that will fracture their family and leave Jo broken and searching for her own identity and the meaning of family. The first season also stars Fiona Fu as Weiran Xie, the matriarch who holds the Xie family together; Loretta Yu as Charlie's widow Teresa Fai; Elfina Luk as his sister Anna, who is plotting her eventual takeover of the family business empire; Simu Liu as his brother Paul, a guardian of many of the family's shady secrets; and Peter Outerbridge as Detective Al Gorski, a police colleague of Josephine's.

In the second season, Jo Bradley is called upon by her friend Teresa to find Teresa's boyfriend, Jimmy Lin, who is on the run after witnessing a brutal murder. But finding Jimmy will once again bring Jo and her partner Detective Evan Ong into the orbit of Teresa’s father-in-law, ruthless billionaire Ron Xie and the undertow of his dark secrets. Selena Lee joins the cast as Michelle Chang, a disgraced detective turned a deadly assassin who factors into Jo and Evan's investigation.

The third season, subtitled Fire and Ice, follows Michelle Chang, now a Toronto-based private detective, on a personal mission to hunt down Norris Pang (Sean Baek), the man who has kidnapped Michelle's estranged daughter. Meanwhile, the Xie family has also relocated to Toronto, where Anna has been trying to rebuild the family's fortunes and reputation, much to her father's chagrin. Michelle and Anna's paths cross when they realize that Norris is now masterminding a money laundering scheme that threatens Anna's plans to expand the Xie family's casino.

== Release ==
The first season began airing the first block of eight episodes on November 8, 2015. The first season was further extended with a second block of eight episodes, which began airing on November 13, 2016.

The second season of eight episodes began airing on September 9, 2018. Selena Lee was nominated as the best-supporting actress in drama series in 7th Canadian Screen Awards in 2019.

The third and final season - Blood and Water - Fire and Ice of eight episodes began airing on June 13, 2021.
