= Sumathy Balaram =

Sri Lankan-Canadian filmmaker and actress

Sumathy Balaram is a Sri Lankan-Canadian filmmaker and actress. She is most noted for her 2015 feature film Niyoga, and her performance in the 2025 short film Karupy.

Born and raised in Jaffna, she emigrated to Canada in 1989. She has also directed a number of short films, and was a founder of Uyirppu Progressive Tamil Women Artistic Organization, a theatre company that produces and stages plays about Tamil women. She played a lead role in the theatrical performance You, Always, Never, which debuted at the 2026 Toronto Fringe Festival.

For Karupy, she won the award for Outstanding Performer in a Canadian Short Film at the 2025 Toronto Reel Asian International Film Festival, and received a Canadian Screen Award nomination for Best Performance in a Live Action Short Drama at the 14th Canadian Screen Awards in 2026.

== Filmography ==
=== Director ===
- Mannamuzh (2001)
- Inni (2002)
- Uashh (2003)
- Manushi (2004)
- You2 (2005)
- To Be Continued (2006)
- Pillai (2007)
- Niyoga (2015)

=== Actress ===
- Rooba (2017)
- Funny Boy (2020)
- The Misadventure of Unlikely Heroes (2022)
- Karupy (2025)
