= Blue Thunder (2015 film) =

- French: Bleu tonnerre
- Directed by: Philippe David Gagné; Jean-Marc E. Roy
- Written by: Philippe David Gagné; Jean-Marc E. Roy
- Produced by: Ménaïc Raoul; Gabrielle Tougas-Fréchette
- Starring: Dany Placard; Isabelle Blais; Sandrine Bisson; Louis Champagne
- Cinematography: Olivier Gossot
- Edited by: Philippe David Gagné; Jean-Marc E. Roy
- Music by: Dany Placard
- Production company: Voyelles Films
- Release date: March 12, 2015 (Saguenay)
- Running time: 21 minutes
- Country: Canada
- Language: French

Blue Thunder (French: Bleu tonnerre) is a Canadian short musical comedy-drama film, directed by Philippe David Gagné and Jean-Marc E. Roy and released in 2015.

The film stars Dany Placard as Bruno, a sawmill worker whose girlfriend (Isabelle Blais) breaks up with him after suffering a miscarriage. Losing both his home and his job in the aftermath, Bruno is not defeated, but rather decides to rekindle his long-dormant dream of becoming a professional wrestler. The film also stars Sandrine Bisson and Louis Champagne.

The film premiered at the Saguenay International Short Film Festival in March 2015, where it won the Prix créativité and the Bourse de création régionale. It was screened in the Director's Fortnight stream at the 2015 Cannes Film Festival, where it received an honorable mention from the Illy Prize jury.

The film received a Quebec Cinema Award nomination for Best Short Film at the 18th Quebec Cinema Awards, and a Canadian Screen Award nomination for Best Live Action Short Drama at the 4th Canadian Screen Awards.
