= Charles-Alexis Desgagnés =

Canadian dancer, choreographer, and actor

Charles-Alexis Desgagnés is a Canadian dancer, choreographer and actor from Quebec. He is most noted for his performance in the short film A Dying Tree (La Peau de l'autre), for which he received a Canadian Screen Award nomination for Best Performance in a Live Action Short Drama at the 14th Canadian Screen Awards in 2026.

He studied dance at the Toronto Dance Theatre, but left the program after a year and has been largely a self-taught dancer and choreographer. In 2018 he was a finalist in the first season of the dance competition series Révolution; his younger brother Julien also competed in the same series in 2021. Following Révolution, he appeared in Cirque Eloize's 2019 production of Seul ensemble, a dance show built around the music of Quebec rock icon Serge Fiori.

He subsequently launched his own dance company, Personne Danse, with whom he has created and performed dance shows including J’ai pleuré ce matin dans le métro, Mue érable, and L'Appel des braises.
