= The Rose Maker =

- French: La fine fleur
- Directed by: Pierre Pinaud
- Written by: Fadette Drouard; Philippe Le Guay; Pierre Pinaud
- Produced by: Stéphanie Carreras; Philippe Pujo
- Starring: Catherine Frot
- Cinematography: Guillaume Deffontaines
- Edited by: Valérie Deseine; Loïc Lallemand
- Music by: Mathieu Lamboley
- Production companies: Auvergne Rhône-Alpes Cinéma; Estrella Productions; France 3 Cinéma
- Distributed by: Diaphana Films
- Release date: 29 August 2020 (Angoulême)
- Running time: 105 minutes
- Country: France
- Language: French
- Budget: $6.4 million
- Box office: $2.9 million

The Rose Maker (French: La fine fleur) is a 2020 French comedy film, directed by Pierre Pinaud. The film stars Catherine Frot as Ève Vernet, a formerly successful rose grower on the verge of bankruptcy, who hires three workers with no horticultural skills and must train them to help save her business.

== Plot ==
Ève Vernet, a renowned rose breeder, runs a horticultural company inherited from her father, which is experiencing serious financial difficulties. Vernet's secretary, Vera, recruits three employees through a back-to-work program run through a homeless shelter in a bid to rescue the company. In exchange for reduced wages, Vernet must train Fred, Nadège and Samir in horticulture.

Ève's business name and skills are coveted by a powerful competitor, Lamarzelle, a corporate company with a leader driven only by profit. Ève is repulsed by his business model, particularly that the eponymous CEO takes the credit for the hybrids which are the result of his employee's labour, not his. But the financial ruin of Roses Vernet may force Ève to bend to pressure to a proposed buy-out.

In an effort to save her company, Ève wants to create a new hybrid rose to enter in an upcoming rose competition, the financial remuneration and recognition of which would save her from dissolution or purchase from Lamarzelle. But one of the necessary parent roses, 'The Lion' is in the conservatory of Lamarzelle, who refuses to lend out their specimens to retain exclusivity. Ève's discovery of young Fred's history of burglary inspires her, and she and Fred plan a heist with the help of Nadège and Samir in exchange for permanent contracts.

The heist succeeds, with Fred displaying ingenuity and an exceptional sense of smell to correctly identify the rose. Ève realises that Fred has a gift, and that she could open the doors to a successful career in perfumery for him, though he rejects the idea of getting tested due to his childhood. Back home, Ève carries out the delicate hybridisation process, showing the three employees what to do and allowing them to practice their own hybridisation on the wild rose stock.

In order to meet financial obligations until the hybrids are flowering, Samir and Nadège sell greenhouse-forced (not naturally occurring for the season) roses door-to-door, while Fred hustles in his own unique way. Following a hail shower that causes considerable damage to the greenhouse and its stock, Ève resigns herself to mortgage her house and sell some of her furniture. She eventually convinces Fred to take an olfactory test, the results of which land him a place in a renowned perfumery college in Paris.

Unfortunately, the hybridisation of 'The Lion' and 'Rosa Wichuraiana' is unsuccessful, taking on none of the traits Ève hoped to cultivate. She resigns to sell her late father's business to Lamarzelle, with the stipulation her employees all retain permanent contracts. Concurrently, Fred leaves for Paris to begin his training in perfumery, opening Ève's parting gift, The Language of Flowers by Vanessa Diffenbaugh, on the bus. Inside he finds three pressed flowers: Campanula, for 'thank you', Blue pansy for 'I'm going to miss you', and Forget-me-not for 'memories'.

As Ève prepares to sign the sales contract, Nadège realises that one of the hybrids she, Samir and Fred have made to practice, has produced an exceptional rose bush that could win an award. Ève cancels the sale at the last second, pinning her faith on her unlikely heroes. The rose wins the gold medal in the Concours international de roses nouvelles de Bagatelle (International Competition for New Roses). In her winning speech, she expresses her gratitude and love for Fred, Nadège and Samir.

== Cast ==
- Catherine Frot as Ève Vernet
- Melan Omerta as Fred
- Fatsah Bouyahmed as Samir
- Olivia Côte as Véra
- Marie Petiot as Nadège
- Vincent Dedienne as Lamarzelle

== Production ==
The film entered production in 2019.

The film premiered on 29 August 2020 at the Angoulême Francophone Film Festival. It was subsequently screened at several francophone or bilingual film festivals in Canada, including the 2020 Cinéfest Sudbury International Film Festival and the Abitibi-Témiscamingue International Film Festival. It is slated to premiere commercially in 2021.

== Reception ==
On Rotten Tomatoes, the film holds an approval rating of 96% based on 23 reviews.
