= Marine Johnson =

Canadian actress from Quebec

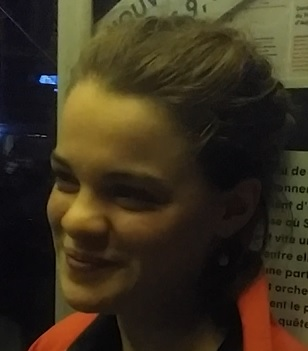
Marine Johnson

Marine Johnson is a Canadian actress from Quebec. She is most noted for her performance in the 2017 film The Little Girl Who Was Too Fond of Matches (La petite fille qui aimait trop les allumettes), for which she received a Canadian Screen Award nomination for Best Actress at the 6th Canadian Screen Awards, and a Prix Iris nomination for Revelation of the Year at the 20th Quebec Cinema Awards.

She had her first acting role in Anaïs Barbeau-Lavalette and André Turpin's 2012 short film Ina Litovski. with other noted film roles including A Paradise Too Far (Y’est où le paradis?) in 2017.

In 2020 she appeared in Barbeau-Lavalette's feature film Goddess of the Fireflies (La déesse des mouches à feu), and in 2023 she appeared in Florence Lafond's short film Until You Die (Jusqu'à ce que tu meures).

In 2021 she appeared in Ivan Grbovic's film Drunken Birds (Les Oiseaux ivres), for which she received a Canadian Screen Award nomination for Best Supporting Actress at the 10th Canadian Screen Awards.

She received a Canadian Screen Award nomination for Best Performance in a Live Action Short Drama at the 12th Canadian Screen Awards in 2024, for Until You Die.
