= The Little Shopping Trolley =

2024 Canadian short film directed by Laurence Ly

- French: Le petit panier à roulettes
- Directed by: Laurence Ly
- Written by: Laurence Ly
- Produced by: Laurence Ly; Koussay Hamzeh
- Starring: Laura Luu; Chloé Djandji; Sandrine Bisson
- Cinematography: Guy-Carl Dubé
- Edited by: Namaï Kham Po
- Music by: Thierry Simard
- Production company: Les Films Voi
- Release date: July 28, 2024 (Fantasia)
- Running time: 18 minutes
- Country: Canada
- Language: French

The Little Shopping Trolley (French: Le petit panier à roulettes) is a Canadian short drama film, written and directed by Laurence Ly and released in 2024. The film stars Laura Luu as Trang, a Vietnamese Canadian mother in Montreal living on a limited budget, who is forced to resort to subterfuge when a grocery store refuses to sell her 12 containers of laundry detergent at the discounted coupon price.

The cast also includes Chloé Djandji, Sandrine Bisson, Jean Bui, Miko Nguyen-Cromp, Charlie Nguyen-Cromp, Charlotte Poitras, Maxime-Olivier Potvin, Martin Desgagné, Michael Richard and Daniel Bernatchez.

== Awards ==
Award	Year	Category	Recipient	Result	Ref.
Abitibi-Témiscamingue International Film Festival	2024	Jury Prize Crave	Laurence Ly	Won	
Les Percéides	2024	Winner Best Short Film Quebecois	The Little Shopping Trolley	Won	
Canadian Screen Awards	2025	Best Performance in a Live Action Short Drama	Laura Luu	Nominated	
