= Tigertail (film) =

2020 American drama film

- Official poster
- Directed by: Alan Yang
- Written by: Alan Yang
- Produced by: Charles King; Kim Roth; Poppy Hanks; Alan Yang
- Starring: Tzi Ma; Christine Ko; Hayden Szeto; Lee Hong-chi; Kunjue Li; Fiona Fu; Yang Kuei-mei; James Saito; Joan Chen
- Cinematography: Nigel Bluck
- Edited by: Daniel Haworth
- Music by: Michael Brook
- Production company: MACRO
- Distributed by: Netflix
- Release date: April 10, 2020
- Running time: 91 minutes
- Country: United States
- Languages: English; Taiwanese Hokkien; Mandarin

Tigertail is a 2020 American drama film written and directed by Alan Yang in his directorial debut. The film stars Tzi Ma, Christine Ko, Hayden Szeto, Lee Hong-chi, Kunjue Li, Fiona Fu, Yang Kuei-mei, James Saito and Joan Chen.

Tigertail was released on April 10, 2020, by Netflix.

== Plot ==
Pin-Jui is a young boy from a poor family living in Huwei ("tiger tail"). His father died when he was a year old, so his mother sent him to live with his grandparents who work in a rice field removed from Huwei. There, he meets a similarly aged girl, Yuan Lee, from a wealthy family. They spend an idyllic few years together, but after he returns to Huwei, he loses touch with her.

Years later, after Pin-Jui and Yuan have grown into young adults, they reconnect in Huwei and begin an intense romance. Pin-Jui feels they can never marry, however, because of the economic disparity of their families. During this time, he works at the same factory as his mother, Minghua, doing manual labor.

The boss of the factory tells Pin-Jui that he has heard that Pin-Jui wants to go to America, to which the teen replies it is his dream. The boss tells Pin-Jui to meet his daughter Zhenzhen. During dinner, Pin-Jui and Zhenzhen make small talk but seem unable to connect. After dinner, Pin-Jui rushes to see Yuan, who wonders why he is late. Pin-Jui lies that he was just at home and forgot the time. Afterwards, Pin-Jui shows Yuan his home. One day at the factory, Minghua gets into an accident and hurts her hand. This prompts Pin-Jui to marry Zhenzhen so that he can move to America and provide a better life for his mother.

Pin-Jui and Zhenzhen get into a car for the airport, and while riding, he sees a woman who looks like Yuan seeing him.

After moving to America, the couple move into a small apartment, and Pin-Jui gets a job working at a grocery store. Zhenzhen stays at home and cleans. Feeling lonely, she begins doing small loads of laundry to see other people. She eventually meets Peijing, another Taiwanese woman, at the laundromat and they become friends. While hanging out, Zhenzhen confides in Peijing that she doesn't connect with Pin-Jui and wants to become a teacher. Peijing tells her that they will begin to connect over time and encourages her to pursue a teaching career. While Zhenzhen is at dinner, Pin-Jui calls his mother and tells her she can come to America. His mother declines, however, saying she likes it in Taiwan and neither speaks English nor has friends in America. After coming home from dinner with Peijing, Zhenzhen finds Pin-Jui at home, where he immediately asks where she has been. Zhenzhen tells him she was having dinner with Peijing and that she wants to become a teacher. Pin-Jui discourages her from pursuing teaching, thinking she will have little time to take care of the children they will have. Though she tells him that they do not have kids yet, she gets pregnant soon after, and they move out of their small apartment.

Pin-Jui and Zhenzhen have a daughter, Angela. Growing up, the father and his daughter have an estranged relationship. In a flashback, Angela forgets part of the song she plays at a piano recital, to the embarrassment of her parents. She cries in the car on the way home, and Pin-Jui tells her crying will not solve anything. After the children are grown up, Zhenzhen tells Pin-Jui she wants a divorce because she feels Pin-Jui treats her like a servant and seems to care only for himself.

Angela moves into an apartment with her fiance Eric, and her father visits her there. He expresses reservations about Eric, saying her fiance does not work as hard as Angela.

Later, Angela picks up her father from the airport, as he has returned from a trip to Taiwan to attend his mother's funeral. She did not know he went to Taiwan and asks why he did not tell her about the funeral. He tells her that she did not know her grandmother. After Pin-Jui is dropped off at home, his ex-wife calls him to say Angela has been having a hard time at work. Pin-Jui says he did not know and Zhenzhen asks for him to connect with her more.

Pin-Jui asks to have lunch with his daughter, and they spend most of it in silence. She eventually says Eric left her, but feels Pin-Jui does not comfort her. She leaves the lunch abruptly in frustration.

One day, Pin-Jui looks up Yuan on Facebook and they begin messaging. When she comes to New York from Maryland, they decide to meet at a Chinese restaurant. They talk about the past and missed opportunities and she says she is happily married, and he admits his difficulties in connecting with his daughter. She suggests that he open up to Angela about his life.

Angela hosts a Chinese New Year party for family and friends. Her mother, now a teacher, attends with a new partner, who clearly makes her happier than Pin-Jui did. After the party, Pin-Jui stays to his daughter's surprise and opens up about his tragic past. He eventually takes her to Taiwan — including his hometown — and begins to tell his life story.

== Cast ==
- Tzi Ma as Pin-Jui
  - Hong Chi-Lee as young Pin-Jui
- Fiona Fu as Zhenzhen, Pin-Jui’s wife
  - Kunjue Li as young Zhenzhen
- Christine Ko as Angela, Pin-Jui and Zhenzhen’s daughter
- Hayden Szeto as Eric, Angela’s boyfriend
- Joan Chen as Yuan
  - Yo-Hsing Fang as Young Yuan
- Cindera Che as Peijing
- Margot Bingham as Lara
- Yang Kuei-mei as Minghua
- James Saito as Hank

== Production ==
In May 2018, it was revealed that Alan Yang would write and direct Tigertail for Netflix, making it his directorial debut. In August 2018, John Cho, Christine Ko, Tzi Ma, Kunjue Li and Hayden Szeto joined the cast. In September 2018, Joan Chen, Lee Hong-chi, Yo-Hsing Fang, Fiona Fu, Margot Bingham, Yang Kuei-mei and James Saito were announced as the rest of the cast. In February 2019, Jessica Gomes announced on her Instagram as part of the cast.

Principal photography commenced on August 27, 2018, in New York and Taiwan. During post-production on the film, Cho's scenes were cut.

== Release ==
The film was released on Netflix and in select theatres on April 10, 2020.

== Critical reception ==
Tigertail received positive reviews from film critics. As of October 2021, 81% of the 80 reviews compiled on Rotten Tomatoes are positive, and have an average score of 7/10. The site's critical consensus reads: "Uneven yet revealing, Tigertail offers a well-acted -- and ultimately valuable -- look at the immigrant experience in America." On Metacritic, the film holds a rating of 65 out of 100, based on 19 critics, indicating "generally favorable reviews".
