= Giran Findlay Liu =

Giran Findlay Liu is a Canadian film director and screenwriter based in Toronto, Ontario. He is most noted for his 2025 short film Year of the Dragon, which won the Canadian Screen Award for Best Live Action Short Drama at the 14th Canadian Screen Awards in 2026.

An alumnus of Toronto Metropolitan University, his student film Execution Triptych was screened in the Young Creators Showcase at TIFF Next Wave in 2023. Year of the Dragon premiered in the Short Cuts lineup at the 2025 Toronto International Film Festival. It later won the award for Best Canadian Short Film, and Findlay Liu won the award for Best Director of a Canadian Short Film, at the 2025 Vancouver Asian Film Festival.

== Filmography ==
- Line - 2019
- Execution Triptych - 2022
- Eleanor in the Evening - 2024
- Things Behind the Sun - 2024
- Year of the Dragon - 2025
- Footsteps on the Ceiling - 2026
