= Kalainithan Kalaichelvan =

Tamil Canadian film director

Kalainithan Kalaichelvan is a Tamil Canadian film director and screenwriter. He is most noted for his 2025 short film Karupy, which was a Canadian Screen Award nominee for Best Live Action Short Drama at the 14th Canadian Screen Awards in 2026.

He previously directed a number of short films and music videos before studying at the Canadian Film Centre, where he made Karupy as his student project. In 2022 he received a Juno Award nomination for Video of the Year, for Shan Vincent de Paul's "Neeye Oli".

Karupy premiered in the Short Cuts program at the 2025 Toronto International Film Festival.

His first feature film, A Varnam in Silence, is in development.

His brother, Kalaisan Kalaichelvan, is also active as a film and television score composer.

== Filmography ==
- Stella Maris - 2017
- Inland Freaks - 2017
- The Windless Days - 2018
- Petit Four - 2019
- Kingdom Animalia: The Melanie Fyfe Story - 2020
- 80613 - 2020
- Two Doves on a Painted Lake - 2020
- A Feller and the Tree - 2021
- Junglefowl - 2023
- Karupy - 2025
- Till the Milk Runs Dry - 2026
