= Kim Thúy =

Vietnamese-born Canadian novelist (born 1968)

Kim Thúy CM CQ
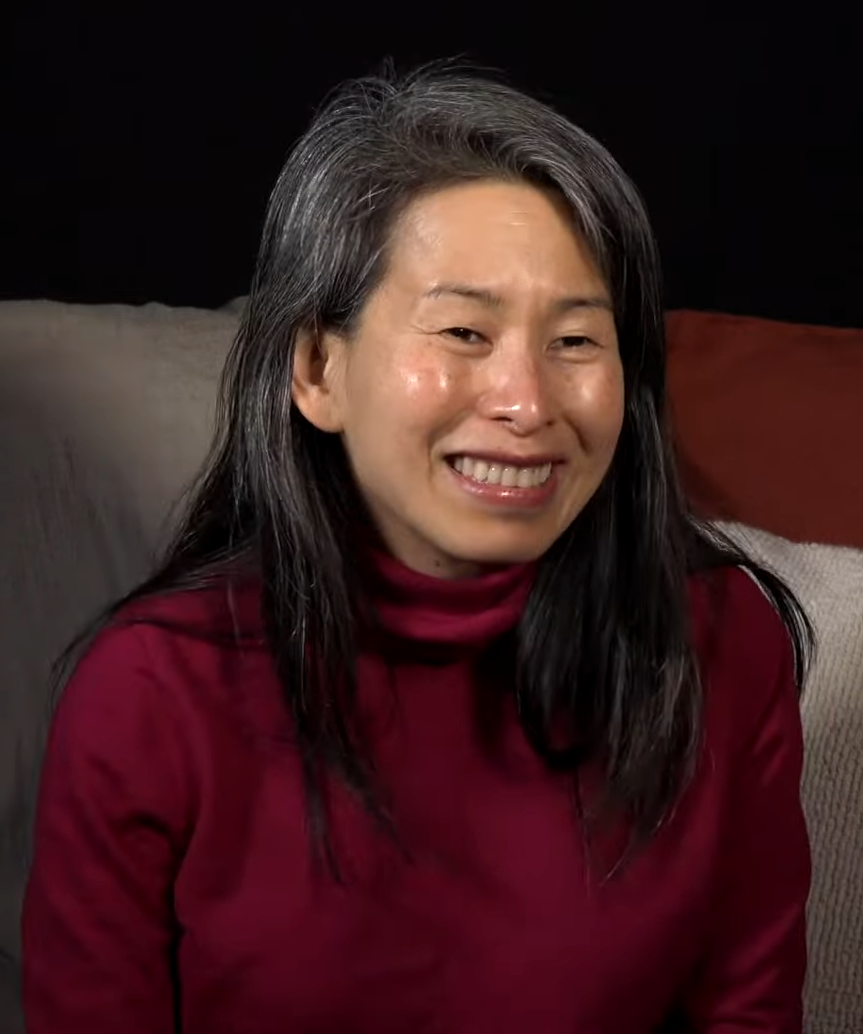
- Thúy in 2021
- Born: September 18, 1968 (age 58); Saigon, South Vietnam
- Education: Université de Montréal
- Occupation: Novelist
- Children: 2
- Writing career
- Genre: Migrant literature
- Notable work: Ru (2009)

Kim Thúy Ly Thanh (born 1968) is a Vietnamese-born Canadian writer. At the age of 10 she left Vietnam along with a wave of refugees commonly referred to in the media as the "boat people" and settled with her family in Quebec, Canada. As an author she has received many awards, including a Governor General’s Award in 2010, and was one of the top 4 finalists of the Right Livelihood Award in 2018. Her books have sold more than 850,000 copies around the world across 43 countries and have been translated into 31 languages. Thúy lives in Montreal.

== Life and career ==
At the age of ten, Thúy left Vietnam with her parents and two brothers, joining more than one million Vietnamese boat people fleeing the country after the fall of Saigon in 1975. Her family arrived at a refugee camp in Malaysia run by the United Nations High Commission for Refugees, where they spent four months before a Canadian delegation selected her parents for refugee status because of their French-language proficiency. In late 1979, Thúy and her family arrived in Granby, in the Eastern Townships of Quebec, and later settled in Montreal.

Thúy earned a bachelor's degree from the Université de Montréal in linguistics and translation in 1990, and later earned a law degree from the same school in 1993. In her early career, Thúy worked as a translator and interpreter and was recruited by the Montreal-based law firm Stikeman Elliott to help with a Vietnam-based project. In this capacity, she returned to Vietnam as one of a group of Canadian experts advising the country's communist leadership on their tentative steps toward capitalism. She met her husband while working at the same firm, and the couple had their first child while on assignment in Vietnam. Their second child was born after the couple relocated to Bangkok, Thailand, for of her husband's work.

After moving back to Montreal, Thúy opened a modern Vietnamese cuisine restaurant called Ru de Nam. She worked as a restaurateur for five years, after which she dedicated a year to creative writing and received a publishing contract for her first book thanks to a former patron of Ru de Nam.

In 2015, Thúy was one of the recipients of the Top 25 Canadian Immigrant Award from Canadian Immigrant. She was also made a Knight of the National Order of Québec.

Thúy was a spokesperson for Petit Robert between 2016 and 2018 and was featured in the 2018 edition of the Robert illustré.

In 2017, Thúy was the recipient of an honorary doctorate from Concordia University. She received a National Assembly of Québec Medal of Honour the same year.

She was nominated for the New Academy Prize in Literature in 2018.

In 2019 she was made Compagne of the Ordre des arts et des lettres du Québec and received an honorary doctorate from Bishop's University.

In 2022 she was president of the selection committee for the Prix Ulrick-Chérubin.

In 2023 she was made a Member of the Order of Canada.

== Work ==
Thúy's debut novel Ru won the Governor General's Award for French-language fiction at the 2010 Governor General's Awards. An English edition, translated by Sheila Fischman, was published in 2012. The novel was shortlisted for the 2012 Giller Prize and the 2013 Amazon Canada First Novel Award. The novel won the 2015 edition of Canada Reads, where it was championed by Cameron Bailey.

In 2016, Thúy published her third novel, Vi. An English translation, again by Fischman, was published in 2018. The book was longlisted for the 2018 Giller Prize.

Ru, a film adaptation of Thúy's novel, was directed by Charles-Olivier Michaud and released in 2023.

In 2025, her first play, Ấm, premiered at the Théâtre du Nouveau Monde.

== Bibliography ==
- Ru (Libre Expression, 2009)
  - Translated by Sheila Fischman (Random House of Canada, 2012)
- À toi (Libre Expression, 2011), co-written with Pascal Janovjak
- Mãn (Libre Expression, 2013)
  - Translated by Sheila Fischman (Random House of Canada, 2014)
- Vi (Libre Expression, 2016)
  - Translated by Sheila Fischman (Random House of Canada, 2018)
- L’Autisme expliqué aux non-autistes (Trécarré, 2017), co-written with Brigitte Harrisson and Lise St-Charles
  - New Ways of Understanding Autism, translated by Juliet Sutcliffe (Dundurn Press, 2019)
- Le secret des Vietnamiennes (Trécarré, 2017)
  - Secrets from My Vietnamese Kitchen, translated by Sheila Fischman and Marie Asselin (Random House of Canada, 2019)
- Le poisson et l'oiseau (De la Bagnole, 2019)
- Em (Libre Expression, 2020)
  - Translated by Sheila Fischman (Random House of Canada, 2021)

== Awards and honours ==
Year	Nominated work	Award	Category	Result	Ref.
2010	Ru	Grand prix RTL-Lire	—	Winner	
2010	Ru	Salon du livre de Montréal Prix du Grand Public La Presse	Essai/Livre pratique	Winner	
2010	Ru	Governor General's Award	French-language fiction	Winner	
2011	Ru	Mondello Prize	Multiculturalism	Winner	
2011	Ru	Grand prix littéraire Archambault	—	Winner	
2013	—	Ensemble pour le respect de la diversité Prix de la tolérance Paul Gérin-Lajoie	—	Winner	
2018	—	Women's Y Foundation Women of Distinction Award	Arts, Culture and Design	Winner	
2018	—	New Academy Prize in Literature	—	Finalist	
2025	—	Writers' Trust Awards	Engel/Findley Award	Winner	
