= Zoë Peak =

Zoë Peak is a Canadian actress. She is most noted for her performance in the 2024 short film On a Sunday at Eleven, for which she received a Canadian Screen Award nomination for Best Performance in a Live Action Short Drama at the 13th Canadian Screen Awards in 2025.
