= On a Sunday at Eleven =

2024 Canadian short film directed by Alicia K. Harris

- Directed by: Alicia K. Harris
- Written by: Alicia K. Harris
- Produced by: Hayley Brown; Jeff Chiu
- Starring: Zoë Peak; Amia Ogieva
- Cinematography: Jeremy Cox
- Edited by: Ashley Gilmour
- Production company: Frontgirl Films
- Release date: September 9, 2024 (TIFF)
- Running time: 9 minutes
- Country: Canada
- Language: English

On a Sunday at Eleven is a Canadian short drama film, written and directed by Alicia K. Harris and released in 2024. The film stars Zoë Peak as Angel, a young girl who is the only Black Canadian student in her weekly dance classes, and feels pressured to conform to Eurocentric beauty standards.

The cast also includes Amia Ogieva as Angel's mother, as well as Valérie Carrier, Darius Zee, Serena Powell, Samaya Hodge, Phyola James, Eletha Sandra Cooke, Abigail Dunbar, Naomi Bowen, Verna Hodge, Malea Yarde, Severyn Dahlke, Jasmine Best and Evelyn Effs in supporting roles.

The film premiered at the 2024 Toronto International Film Festival. It is also slated to screen in the Generations program at the 75th Berlin International Film Festival, and at the 40th Santa Barbara International Film Festival in February 2025.

== Awards ==
The film was named to TIFF's annual Canada's Top Ten list for 2024, and received a Black Reel Award nomination for Best Short Film at the Black Reel Awards of 2025.

The film won the Canadian Screen Award for Best Live Action Short Drama, and Peak was nominated for Best Performance in a Live Action Short Drama, at the 13th Canadian Screen Awards in 2025.

It won the award for Best Short Film at the 2025 Directors Guild of Canada awards.
