= Simon Leoza =

Canadian composer

Simon Leoza is a Canadian composer from Quebec, whose music blends neoclassical, ambient, electronic and jazz influences.

He released three EPs under the pseudonym Tambour before releasing Albatross, his first full-length album, under his own name in 2021. In May 2021 he performed a show at the Montreal Symphony House, which he subsequently released as a mini-album.

His video for "La nuée", directed by Vincent René-Lortie, was a Juno Award nominee for Video of the Year at the Juno Awards of 2022, and was shortlisted for the 2022 Prism Prize.

In the same year, he composed music for René-Lortie's short film Invincible.

In 2023 he released L'Enfer d'un monde, a score for a ballet work by the Zemmour Ballet.

His most recent album, Acte III, was released in 2024.
