= Year of the Dragon (2025 film) =

2025 Canadian short film directed by Giran Findlay Liu

- Film poster
- Directed by: Giran Findlay Liu
- Written by: Giran Findlay Liu
- Produced by: Lina Li
- Starring: Fiona Fu
- Cinematography: Vincent Prochoroff
- Edited by: Maria Bykina
- Production company: Sublime Pictures
- Release date: September 8, 2025 (TIFF)
- Running time: 13 minutes
- Country: Canada
- Languages: English; Mandarin; Cantonese

Year of the Dragon is a Canadian short drama film, directed by Giran Findlay Liu and released in 2025. The film stars Fiona Fu as Beatrice, a Chinese Canadian immigrant mother who orders a cake for her son's birthday, only to face various challenges and complications as she sets out to pick up and deliver it.

The film premiered in the Short Cuts program at the 2025 Toronto International Film Festival.

== Awards ==
Award	Date of ceremony	Category	Recipient	Result	Ref.
Canadian Screen Awards	2026	Best Live Action Short Drama	Giran Findlay Liu	Won	
Canadian Screen Awards	2026	Best Performance in a Live Action Short Drama	Fiona Fu	Won	
Vancouver Asian Film Festival	2025	Best Canadian Short Film	Giran Findlay Liu	Won	
Vancouver Asian Film Festival	2025	Best Director of a Canadian Short Film	Giran Findlay Liu	Won	
Vancouver Asian Film Festival	2025	Best Cinematography in a Canadian Short Film	Vincent Prochoroff	Won	
