= Léokim Beaumier-Lépine =

Canadian actor (born 2006)

Léokim Beaumier-Lépine (born 2006) is a Canadian actor from Victoriaville, Quebec. He is most noted for his performance in the 2022 short film Invincible, for which he received a Canadian Screen Award nomination for Best Performance in a Live Action Short Drama at the 12th Canadian Screen Awards in 2024.

He has also appeared in the television series Le Pacte, Les Cavaliers and Les Yeux fermés, and the feature film Fanny.
