= Vincent René-Lortie =

Canadian film director

- Citizenship: Canadian
- Occupation: Director
- Known for: Invincible

Vincent René-Lortie is a Canadian film director and screenwriter from Montreal, Quebec, most noted for his 2022 short film Invincible.

He was named amongst the 2022 Young Guns Class. He has been a two-time Juno Award nominee for Video of the Year, receiving nods at the Juno Awards of 2021 for Sheenah Ko's "Wrap Me Up" and at the Juno Awards of 2022 for Simon Leoza's "La Nuée", and a Prism Prize nominee in 2022 for "La Nuée". In 2023 he won a Young Directors Award for "Talk Away the Dark", a public service spot for suicide prevention.

== Career ==
René-Lortie graduated from Montreal’s Mel Hoppenheim School of Cinema with a degree in Film Production. After graduating, he began his career as director of narrative music videos. His music videos La Nuée (2021) and Wrap Me Up (2021) were both nominated at for a Juno Award. In 2016, he co-founded the production company Telescope Films with partners Samuel Caron and Alexandre Nour.

René-Lortie has made several experimental films, one live action short film, and is currently developing his first feature film, You Were Always An Island In 2023, he also directed a piece for the American Foundation for Suicide Prevention, titled Talk Away The Dark.

== Filmography ==
=== Short films ===
- 2022: Invincible
- 2025: A Dying Tree (La Peau de l'autre)

=== Other projects ===
- 2017: The Aviary (La Volière, dance short film)
- 2019: The Man Who Traveled Nowhere in Time (dance short film)
- 2021: Sit Still
- 2021: La Nuée (music video)
- 2023: Talk Away the Dark (commercial short film)
- (pending): You Were Always an Island (feature film)

== Recognition ==
In 2022, René-Lortie was awarded with the Young Guns International Award, an award celebrating creatives under 30 from across the globe.

In 2023, his film Invincible (2022) won the Prix Iris for Best Live Action Short Film at the 25th Quebec Cinema Awards. The short also won a number of awards from international film festivals, including the International Jury Special Award at the 2023 Clermont-Ferrand International Short Film Festival and the Grand Jury Prize at the 2023 Saguenay International Short Film Festival. In January 2024, the film received an Academy Award nomination for Best Live Action Short Film at the 96th Academy Awards.
