= Nadia Essadiqi =

Moroccan-Canadian musician

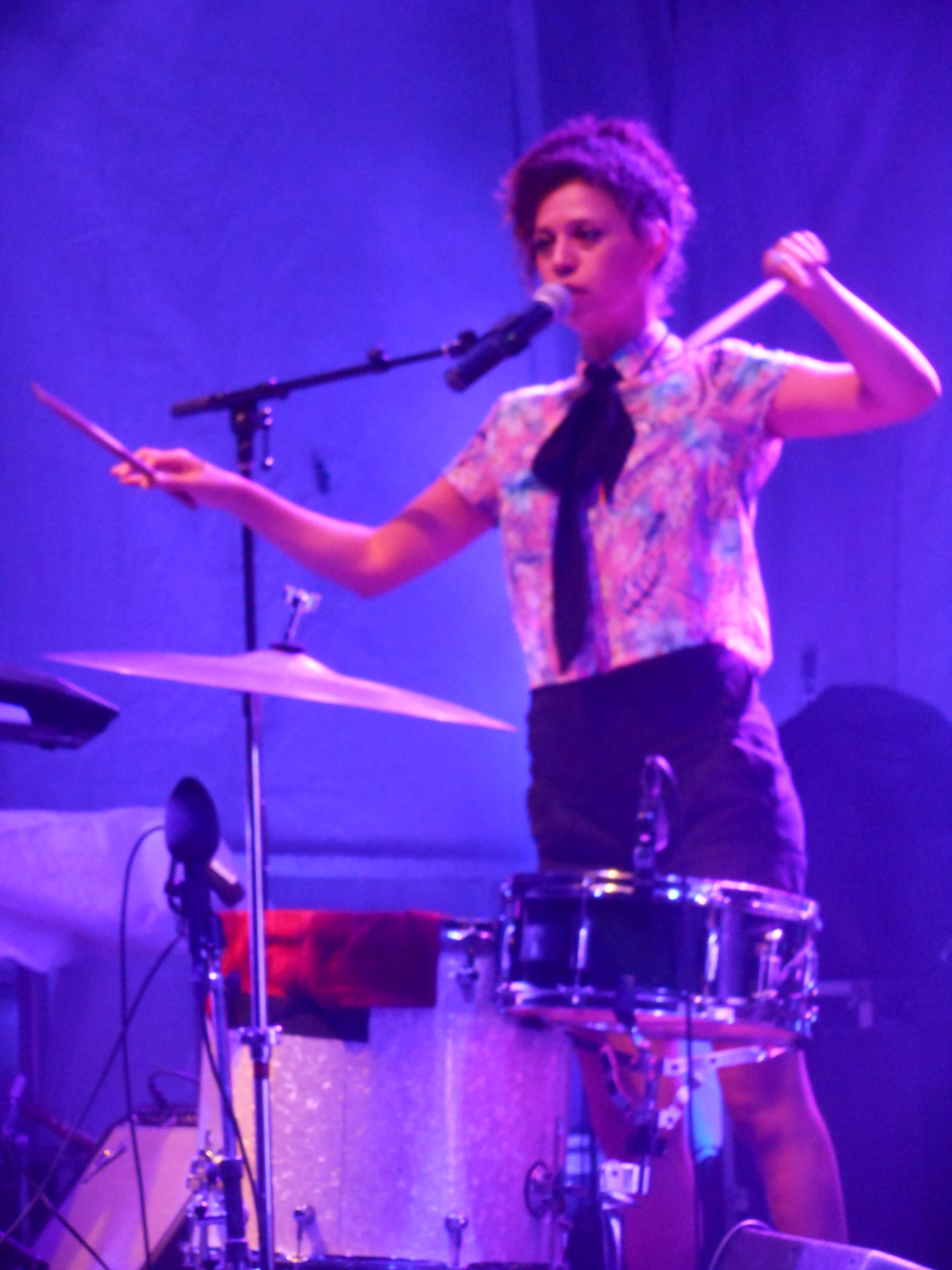
La Bronze, Montreal, 2016-09-09

Nadia Essadiqi, better known by her stage name La Bronze, is a Moroccan-Canadian musician and actress. Although usually singing in French, she is currently best known for her Maghrebi Arabic version of the Stromae hit "Formidable".

As an actress she has appeared in the television series Trauma, season 3 of Ici Radio-Canada Télé's Unité 9, the web series Quart de vie (TOU.TV), the short film Black Forest (Forêt Noire) and the science-fiction Projet-M.

Her first album, La Bronze, was released in September 2014. In 2015, she was nominated "Emerging artist of the year" for the Canadian Music Week Awards. A second album was announced for 2016, and finally released on 3 November 2017.
