= Behtash Fazlali =

Iranian-Canadian actor

Behtash Fazlali is an Iranian-Canadian actor. He is most noted for his performance in the 2023 short film Motherland, for which he won the Canadian Screen Award for Best Performance in a Live Action Short Drama at the 12th Canadian Screen Awards in 2024.
