= See You Garbage! =

- French: Au plaisir les ordures!
- Directed by: Romain Dumont
- Written by: Romain Dumont
- Produced by: Patrick Francke-Sirois
- Starring: Guillaume Laurin; Hamza Meziani; Hamidou Savadogo; Steve Laplante; Caroline Dhavernas; Ralph Prosper
- Cinematography: Antoine Ryan
- Edited by: Anouk Deschênes; Guillaume Marin-Lafond
- Music by: Ilyaa Ghafouri
- Production company: Club Vidéo
- Distributed by: H264
- Release date: September 10, 2021 (Trouville-sur-Mer)
- Running time: 17 minutes
- Country: Canada
- Language: French

See You Garbage! (French: Au plaisir les ordures!) is a Canadian short comedy-drama film, directed by Romain Dumont and released in 2021. The film centres on Nino (Guillaume Laurin), Élle (Hamza Meziani) and Belz (Hamidou Savadogo), three garbage collectors from Montreal who have been unexpectedly invited to have Christmas dinner with the Prime Minister (Steve Laplante) and his wife (Caroline Dhavernas) as part of a staged photo opportunity to show off how in touch the prime minister is with the common man, only for the dinner to go awry as their vastly different sets of social class values come into conflict.

The cast also includes Ralph Prosper as the prime minister's bodyguard.

The film premiered in September 2021 at the Trouville Off-Courts Film Festival in Trouville-sur-Mer, France, and had its Canadian premiere in the national short film competition at the 2021 Festival du nouveau cinéma. It was later screened at the 2022 Slamdance Film Festival, where it received an honorable mention for the Narrative Shorts Grand Jury Prize, and at the 2022 Canadian Film Festival, where it won the award for best short film.
