= Ru (film) =

2023 Canadian drama film

- Directed by: Charles-Olivier Michaud
- Written by: Jacques Davidts
- Based on: Ru by Kim Thúy
- Produced by: André Dupuy; Marie-Alexandra Forget
- Starring: Chloé Djandji; Chantal Thuy; Karine Vanasse; Patrice Robitaille
- Cinematography: Jean-François Lord
- Edited by: Claude Palardy
- Music by: Michel Corriveau
- Production company: Amalga
- Distributed by: Immina Films
- Release date: September 13, 2023 (TIFF)
- Running time: 116 minutes
- Country: Canada
- Languages: French, Vietnamese

Ru is a 2023 Canadian drama film directed by Charles-Olivier Michaud. An adaptation of Kim Thúy's award-winning 2009 novel Ru, the film centres on the coming-of-age of Tinh (Chloé Djandji), a young girl from Vietnam who is adapting to Quebec culture and society after her family move to Granby as refugees from the Vietnam War.

The cast also includes Chantal Thuy, Jean Bui, Olivier Dinh, Xavier Nguyen, Karine Vanasse, Patrice Robitaille, Mali Corbeil Gauvreau, Marie-Thérèse Fortin and Richard Fréchette. It was shot in 2022 in and around Montreal.

The film premiered in the Special Presentations program at the 2023 Toronto International Film Festival.

== Production ==
Director Charles-Olivier Michaud met with Kim Thúy to discuss his ideas for the film. Years later the film went into production with funding from the production company, Amalga, and the financial participation of Telefilm Canada, SODEC, and tax credits. Filming began on February 27 and wrapped up on April 13 of 2022, with additional filming taking place later that year in June. It was filmed in Montreal and surrounding areas.

== Distribution ==
Ru had its world premiere at the 2023 Toronto International Film Festival in the Special Presentations program. Canadian FIlm distributor, Immina Films, released the film in Quebec in November 2023. It was released theatrically to 70 screens on November 24, 2023.

== Awards ==
Award	Date of ceremony	Category	Recipient(s)	Result	Ref(s)
Canadian Screen Awards	2024	Best Supporting Performance in a Drama Film	Chantal Thuy	Won	
Canadian Screen Awards	2024	Best Adapted Screenplay	Jacques Davidts	Nominated	
Canadian Screen Awards	2024	Best Art Direction/Production Design	Marie-Hélène Lavoie	Nominated	
Canadian Screen Awards	2024	Best Cinematography	Jean-François Lord	Nominated	
Canadian Screen Awards	2024	Best Costume Design	Rosalie Clermont	Nominated	
Canadian Screen Awards	2024	Best Sound Editing	Pierre-Jules Audet, Marie-Miel Lacasse Hévey, Monique Vézina, Natalie Fleurant	Nominated	
Canadian Screen Awards	2024	Best Sound Mixing	Hans Laitres, Guillaume Daoust, Maxime Vermette, Daniel Bisson, Mathieu Maillé	Nominated	
Canadian Screen Awards	2024	Best Makeup	Dominique T. Hasbani	Nominated	
Canadian Screen Awards	2024	Best Hair	Vincent Dufault	Nominated	
Prix Iris	December 8, 2024	Best Film	André Dupuy, Marie-Alexandra Forget	Nominated	
Prix Iris	December 8, 2024	Revelation of the Year	Chloé Djandji	Nominated	
Prix Iris	December 8, 2024	Best Art Direction	Marie-Hélène Lavoie	Nominated	
Prix Iris	December 8, 2024	Best Cinematography	Jean-François Lord	Nominated	
Prix Iris	December 8, 2024	Best Original Music	Michel Corriveau	Nominated	
Prix Iris	December 8, 2024	Best Makeup	Dominique T. Hasbani	Nominated	
Prix Iris	December 8, 2024	Best Casting	Nathalie Boutrie, Geneviève Hébert	Nominated	
Prix Iris	December 8, 2024	Prix Michel-Côté	Patrick Roy, Marie-Alexandra Forget, André Dupuy, Charles-Olivier Michaud, Jacques Davidts	Nominated	
