= Black Forest (2018 film) =

2018 Canadian-French short film

- Film poster
- French: Forêt Noire
- Directed by: Philippe David Gagné; Jean-Marc E. Roy
- Written by: Philippe David Gagné; Jean-Marc E. Roy; Daisy Sadler
- Produced by: Philippe David Gagné; Julie Groleau; Thierry Lounas; Jean Marc E. Roy
- Starring: Pascale Montpetit; Nadia Essadiqi; Charli Arcouette-Martineau; Jean-Carl Boucher
- Cinematography: Olivier Gossot
- Edited by: Philippe-David Gagné; Jean-Marc E. Roy
- Music by: Amaury Chabauty
- Production companies: La Boîte de Pickup; Capricci Films; Canal+
- Distributed by: Spira
- Release date: December 1, 2018
- Running time: 20 minutes
- Country: Canada
- Language: French

Black Forest (French: Forêt Noire) is a short drama film, directed by Philippe David Gagné and Jean-Marc E. Roy, and released in 2018. It is a co-production of companies from Canada and France.

== Plot ==
The film centres on three Canadian women travelling in the Jura department of France, who are accused of murder and are ordered by the judge to participate in a forensic reconstruction of the crime.

== Cast ==
The film's cast includes Charli Arcouette-Martineau, Bernard Belley, Jean-Carl Boucher, Érika Brisson, Paul-Henri Callens, Philippe Dillembourg, Nadia Essadiqi, Josée Gagnon, Luc Gauthier, Joanie Guérin, Fayolle Jean, Pascale Montpetit, Christian Ouellet, Guillaume Ouellet, Bruno Piccolo and Sasha Samar.

== Production ==
Although set in France, the film was shot primarily in Saguenay, Quebec, most notably at the Père-Honorat mill in Laterrière.

== Awards ==
The film received a Canadian Screen Award nomination for Best Live Action Short Drama at the 8th Canadian Screen Awards in 2020.
