= Will Niava =

Ivorian-Ghanaian film director

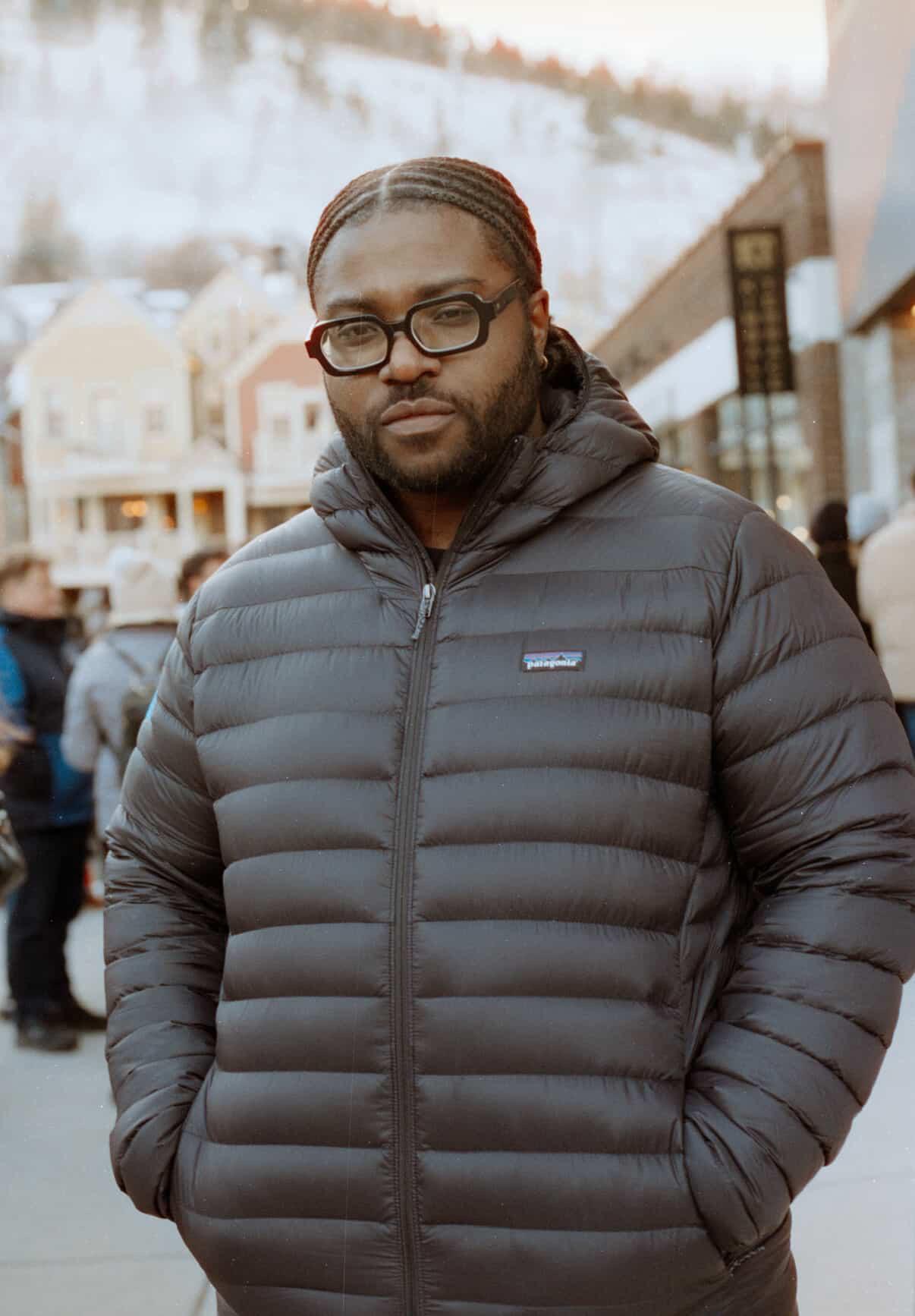
- Niava at the 2026 Sundance Film Festival
- Born: February 17, 1992 (age 34); Abidjan, Ivory Coast
- Education: Mel Hoppenheim School of Cinema
- Occupations: Film director; Screenwriter
- Years active: 2019–present
- Known for: Zoo; Jazz Infernal
- Website: willniava.com

Will Niava (born February 17, 1992) is an Ivorian-Ghanaian film director and screenwriter based in Montreal, Quebec. He is best known for his short films Zoo (2019) and Jazz Infernal (2025), the latter of which won the Short Film Jury Award: International Fiction at the 2026 Sundance Film Festival.

== Early life and education ==
Niava was born in Abidjan, Ivory Coast, and raised in Ghana. He moved to Canada to pursue film studies, attending the Mel Hoppenheim School of Cinema at Concordia University in Montreal. His multicultural background and fluency in multiple languages often inform the themes of his work, which frequently explore the intersection of African and Western identities.

== Career ==
=== Short films ===
Niava's directorial debut, Zoo (2019), premiered at the Clermont-Ferrand International Short Film Festival. The film, which depicts a tense encounter between three youths and a police officer, was praised for its handling of power dynamics and racial tension. It was selected for the Criterion Collection and was a runner-up for the Audience Choice Award at the 2020 Cinéfest Sudbury International Film Festival.

His second short film, Element, won the Best Short Film award in the "Rebels with a Cause" competition at the Tallinn Black Nights Film Festival in 2023.

In 2025, Niava released Jazz Infernal, which premiered in the Short Cuts program at the 2025 Toronto International Film Festival (TIFF). The film was named to TIFF's annual Canada's Top Ten list for 2025. In January 2026, it won the Short Film Jury Award: International Fiction at the Sundance Film Festival, with the jury citing its unique blend of "evocative atmosphere" and "global storytelling influences."

=== Feature films ===
Niava co-wrote the screenplay for the feature film Paradise (2026) alongside director Jérémy Comte. The film, a drama set between Quebec and Ghana, is slated to premiere at the Berlin International Film Festival in February 2026.

=== Commercial work ===
Outside of narrative film, Niava has directed commercial campaigns for major international brands including the NBA, Amazon, and Apple Music.

== Filmography ==
| Year | Title | Director | Writer | Notes |
|---|---|---|---|---|
| 2019 | Zoo | Yes | Yes | Short film |
| 2023 | Element | Yes | Yes | Short film |
| 2025 | Jazz Infernal | Yes | Yes | Short film |
| 2026 | Paradise | No | Yes | Feature film (Co-writer) |

== Awards and nominations ==
| Year | Award | Category | Work | Result |
|---|---|---|---|---|
| 2020 | Cinéfest Sudbury International Film Festival | Audience Choice Award (Shorts) | Zoo | Runner-up |
| 2023 | Tallinn Black Nights Film Festival | Best Short Film (Rebels with a Cause) | Element | Won |
| 2025 | Toronto International Film Festival | Canada's Top Ten | Jazz Infernal | Selected |
| 2026 | Sundance Film Festival | Jury Award: International Fiction | Jazz Infernal | Won |
