= Fauve (film) =

- Film poster
- Directed by: Jérémy Comte
- Written by: Jérémy Comte
- Produced by: Evren Boisjoli; Maria Gracia Turgeon
- Starring: Félix Grenier; Alexandre Perreault; Louise Bombardier
- Cinematography: Olivier Gossot
- Edited by: Jérémy Comte
- Music by: Brian D'Oliveira
- Production companies: Achromatic Media; Midi la Nuit
- Distributed by: H264 Distribution
- Release date: January 19, 2018 (Sundance)
- Running time: 16 minutes
- Country: Canada
- Language: French

Fauve is a Canadian short drama film, directed by Jérémy Comte and released in 2018. The film centres on two boys (Félix Grenier and Alexandre Perreault) looking for adventure near an open pit mine, who are soon drawn into a dangerous situation as their power game spins out of control.

The film was shot near Thetford Mines, Quebec.

== Awards ==
The film premiered at the 2018 Sundance Film Festival, where it won a Special Jury Prize in the short films program. It won several awards at other film festivals throughout the year, including the top award at the Palm Springs International Festival of Short Films, an Honourable Mention from the Best Canadian Short Film jury at the 2018 Toronto International Film Festival, and the Grand Jury Prize at the 24FPS International Short Film Festival.

It was named to TIFF's annual year-end Canada's Top Ten list.

The film won the Canadian Screen Award for Best Live Action Short Drama at the 7th Canadian Screen Awards. It was also an Academy Award nominee for Best Live Action Short Film at the 91st Academy Awards, and a Prix Iris nominee for Best Short Film at the 21st Quebec Cinema Awards.
