= Crème de menthe (film) =

2017 Canadian film

- Film poster
- Directed by: Philippe David Gagné; Jean-Marc E. Roy
- Written by: Philippe David Gagné; Jean-Marc E. Roy
- Produced by: Philippe David Gagné; Jean-Marc E. Roy
- Starring: Charlotte Aubin; Macha Limonchik; Fred-Éric Salvail
- Cinematography: Olivier Gossot
- Edited by: Philippe David Gagné; Jean-Marc E. Roy
- Production company: Spira
- Distributed by: La Boîte de pickup
- Release date: May 2017 (Cannes)
- Running time: 22 minutes
- Country: Canada
- Language: French

Crème de menthe is a Canadian short drama film, directed by Jean-Marc E. Roy and Philippe David Gagné, and released in 2017. The film stars Charlotte Aubin as Renée, a young woman who has been left with the responsibility of cleaning out her hoarder father's apartment after his death. Its cast also includes Macha Limonchik and Fred-Éric Salvail.

The film premiered in the Director's Fortnight stream at the 2017 Cannes Film Festival, and had its Canadian premiere at the 2017 Toronto International Film Festival. It was also screened at the Festival Off-courts de Trouville, where it won the Prix Studio Élément, and at the Quebec City Film Festival, where it won the Prix Public for Best Short Film.

The film received a Prix Iris nomination for Best Live Action Short Film at the 20th Quebec Cinema Awards in 2018.
