= Jérémy Comte =

Canadian film director

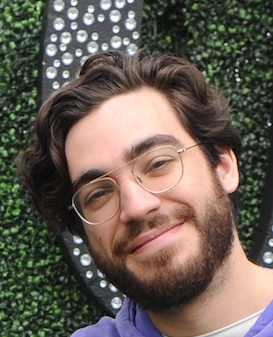
- Citizenship: Canadian
- Education: Concordia University
- Occupations: Film director, screenwriter
- Website: JeremyComte.com

Jérémy Comte is a Canadian film director from Quebec. He is best known for his 2018 short film Fauve which won a Special Jury Prize at the 2018 Sundance Film Festival and the Canadian Screen Award for Best Live Action Short Drama, and was nominated for 91st Academy Awards.

== Life and career ==
Comte grew up in Sherbrooke, Quebec. He graduated from Concordia University, Montreal, majoring in film production at 2013. At the age of 18, Comte made his first short documentary named Feel The Hill. Comte also directed the documentary short films Rueda and Paths and the narrative short film What Remains (Ce qu'il reste).

After directing student films at in Concordia, Comte made his first two fictional short films, the second of which was Fauve (2018). Shot in 2017, the film centres on two boys (Félix Grenier and Alexandre Perreault) looking for adventure near an open pit mine, who are soon drawn into a dangerous situation as their power game spins out of control.

The film premiered at the 2018 Sundance Film Festival and won a Special Jury Prize. It won several awards at other film festivals throughout the year, including the top award at the Palm Springs International Festival of Short Films, an Honourable Mention from the Best Canadian Short Film jury at the 2018 Toronto International Film Festival, and the Grand Jury Prize at the 24FPS International Short Film Festival. It was later named to TIFF's annual year-end Canada's Top Ten list for 2018.

In 2019 the film won the Canadian Screen Award for Best Live Action Short Drama at the 7th Canadian Screen Awards, and nominated for the Academy Award for Best Live Action Short Film at the 91st Academy Awards.

His feature debut, Paradise, is slated for release in 2026. The film's screenplay was co-written with filmmaker Will Niava. In the same year he entered production on his second feature film, Eleo and Nova.

== Filmography ==
=== Feature films ===
Year	Title	Role
2026	Paradise	Director
TBA	Eleo and Nova	Director

=== Short films ===
Year	Title	Role
2012	Rueda	Director, Editor
2014	Paths	Director, Editor, Co-producer
2016	What Remains (Ce qu’il reste)	Director, Editor
2018	Fauve	Director, Editor

=== Music videos ===
Year	Artist	Title	Role
2015	Rivver feat. Milk & Bone	Am I Ok	Director
2016	Daniela Andrade	Shore – A Visual Album	Director
2016	Daniela Andrade	Shore	Director
2016	Daniela Andrade	Come Around	Director
2016	Daniela Andrade	Sound	Director
2016	Daniela Andrade	Digital Age	Director
2017	Aliocha	Sarah	Director
2019	Daniela Andrade	Genesis	Director
2019	Daniela Andrade	Gallo Pinto	Director
2019	Daniela Andrade	Polly Pocket	Director
2020	Daniela Andrade	K.L.F.G.	Director
2020	Daniela Andrade	Puddles	Director
