= Anthony Therrien =

Canadian actor

Anthony Therrien (born December 17, 1997) is a Canadian actor from Charlemagne, Quebec. He is most noted for his performances in the films Fake Tattoos (Les faux tatouages), for which he was a Vancouver Film Critics Circle nominee for Best Actor in a Canadian Film at the Vancouver Film Critics Circle Awards 2017, and Slut in a Good Way (Charlotte a du fun), for which he received a Prix Iris nomination for Best Supporting Actor at the 20th Quebec Cinema Awards in 2018.

He has also appeared in the films The Torrent (Le Torrent), Corbo, 1:54, Miséricorde, Vieux Jeu, The Dishwasher (Le Plongeur), Until You Die (Jusqu'à ce que tu meures) and Out Standing (Seule au front), and the television series Faux départs and Alerte amber.

From 2022 to 2024 he played the leading role of Félix in the drama series Les Bracelets rouges. His character was a leg amputee due to cancer treatment; Therrien himself is not an amputee, and special effects were used to hide his leg.

He received a Canadian Screen Award nomination for Best Performance in a Live Action Short Drama at the 12th Canadian Screen Awards in 2024, for Until You Die.
