= Laura Luu =

Canadian actress and community organizer

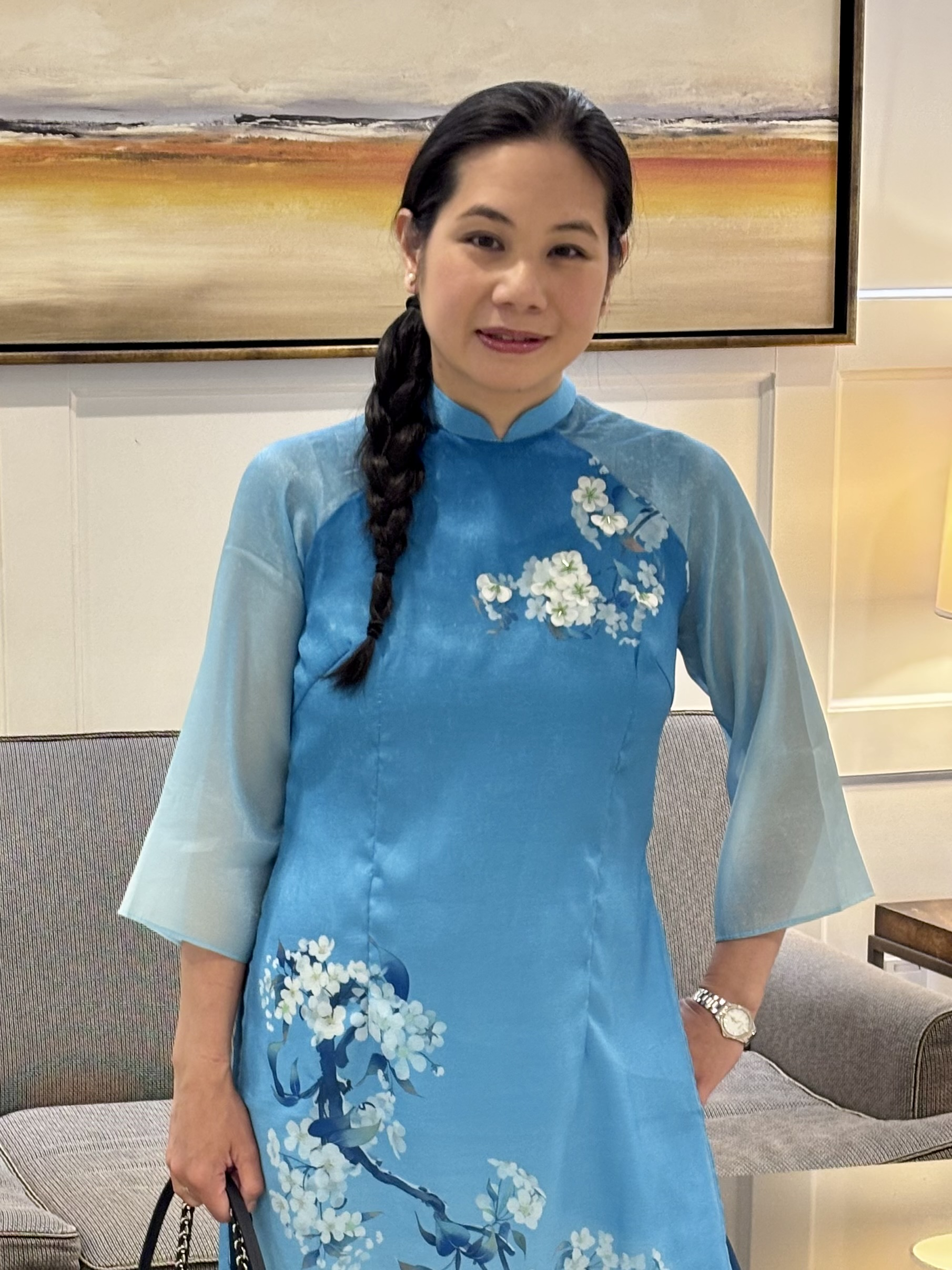
Laura Luu at a public event in 2025

Laura Luu is a Canadian actress and community organizer. She is known for her lead role in the short film The Little Shopping Trolley (Le petit panier à roulettes), which earned her acting nomination at the Canadian Screen Awards and the Vancouver Short Film Festival in 2025. She co-founded a local mutual aid group in Montreal, focused on supporting the Asian community during the COVID-19 pandemic and has been involved in efforts to support Asian restaurants in Canada.
