= Invincible (2022 film) =

- Poster
- Directed by: Vincent René-Lortie
- Written by: Vincent René-Lortie
- Produced by: Samuel Caron
- Starring: Léokim Beaumier-Lépine; Isabelle Blais; Ralph Prosper
- Cinematography: Alexandre Nour-Desjardins
- Edited by: Thomas Bellefleur
- Music by: Simon Leoza
- Production company: Telescope Films
- Distributed by: H264 Distribution
- Release date: 2022
- Running time: 30 minutes
- Country: Canada
- Language: French

Invincible is a 2022 Canadian short drama film written and directed by Vincent René-Lortie.

It was the winner of the Prix Iris for Best Live Action Short Film at the 25th Quebec Cinema Awards in 2023, and was nominated for Best Live Action Short Film at the 96th Academy Awards and Best Live Action Short Drama at the 12th Canadian Screen Awards in 2024.

== Summary ==
Inspired by a true story, the thirty-minute short stars Léokim Beaumier-Lépine as Marc-Antoine Bernier, a troubled young man who has been incarcerated in a youth detention centre; after spending a weekend with his family on a furlough, he is willing to go to any lengths necessary to avoid having to return to the facility.

== Cast ==
The cast also includes Isabelle Blais and Pierre-Luc Brillant as Marc-Antoine's parents, and Élia St-Pierre, Ralph Prosper, Naoufel Chkirate, Miguel Tionjock, and Florence Blain Mbaye in supporting roles.

== Release ==
The film premiered at the 2022 Tirana International Film Festival, and had its Canadian premiere at the 2022 Festival du nouveau cinéma.

== Awards ==
Award	Date	Category	Recipient(s)	Status	Ref
Chicago International Children's Film Festival	2022	Best Live Action Short Film	Samuel Caron, Vincent René-Lortie	Won	
Clermont-Ferrand International Short Film Festival	2023	International Jury Special Award	Samuel Caron, Vincent René-Lortie	Won	
Tampere Film Festival	2023	Best International Fiction	Samuel Caron, Vincent René-Lortie	Won	
Regard – Saguenay International Short Film Festival	2023	Jury Prize	Samuel Caron, Vincent René-Lortie	Won	
Prix Iris	2023	Best Live Action Short Film	Samuel Caron, Vincent René-Lortie	Won	
Academy Awards	2024	Best Live Action Short Film	Samuel Caron, Vincent René-Lortie	Nominated	
Canadian Screen Awards	2024	Best Live Action Short Drama	Samuel Caron, Vincent René-Lortie	Nominated	
Canadian Screen Awards	2024	Best Performance in a Live Action Short Drama	Léokim Beaumier-Lépine	Nominated	
