= Philippe David Gagné =

Philippe David Gagné is a Canadian film director, screenwriter and editor from Saguenay, Quebec. He is most noted for several Canadian Screen Award and Prix Iris nominated short films that he co-directed with Jean-Marc E. Roy, with whom he cofounded the independent film studio La Boîte de pickup in 2015.

== Filmography ==
=== Director ===
- Dandurand Cinquième - 2008, with Philippe Arsenault
- [bwa] - 2009, with Jean-Marc E. Roy
- Patchwork - 2009, with Jean-Marc E. Roy
- 35MPH (Vivre à 35 milles à l'heure) - 2010, with Jean-Marc E. Roy and Dominic Leclerc
- Life and Death of Yul Brynner – 2011, with Jean-Marc E. Roy
- Pick-Up: À la rencontre d'un bout du monde - 2011, with Jean-Marc E. Roy
- Anata O Korosu - 2012
- Le chant des cabanes - 2013
- Cowboy: Un rêve candien - 2013, with Jean-Marc E. Roy
- Blue Thunder (Bleu tonnerre) – 2015, with Jean-Marc E. Roy
- Dialogue(s) - 2016
- Airs communs - 2016, with Jean-Marc E. Roy
- Destrier - 2017
- Crème de menthe – 2017, with Jean-Marc E. Roy
- Black Forest (Forêt noire) – 2018, with Jean-Marc E. Roy
- Un jour de course - 2023

=== Editor ===
- Dandurand Cinquième - 2008
- Life and Death of Yul Brynner – 2011
- Anata O Korosu - 2012
- Le chant des cabanes - 2013
- The Weight (Le Mal-être) - 2014
- The Hearing - 2014
- Softly Spoken - 2014
- Where the Rive Widens - 2014
- Megwitetm - 2014
- The Routes - 2014
- Notes of Understanding - 2014
- Blue Thunder (Bleu tonnerre) – 2015
- Dialogue(s) - 2016
- Destrier - 2017
- Brutes Are Afraid of Silence (Le silence fait peur aux brutes) - 2017
- Crème de menthe – 2017
- Black Forest (Forêt noire) – 2018
- Des histoires inventées – 2018

== Awards ==
Award	Year	Category	Work	Result	Ref
Abitibi-Témiscamingue International Film Festival	2011	Prix Télé-Québec	Life and Death of Yul Brynner with Jean-Marc E. Roy	Won	
Canadian Screen Awards	2016	Best Live Action Short Drama	Blue Thunder (Bleu tonnerre) with Jean-Marc E. Roy	Nominated	
Canadian Screen Awards	2020	Best Live Action Short Drama	Black Forest (Forêt noire) with Jean-Marc E. Roy, Julie Groleau	Nominated	
Gala Québec Cinéma	2016	Best Live Action Short Film	Blue Thunder (Bleu tonnerre) with Jean-Marc E. Roy, Ménaîc Raoul, Gabrielle Tougas-Fréchette	Nominated	
Gala Québec Cinéma	2018	Best Live Action Short Film	Crème de menthe with Jean-Marc E. Roy	Nominated	
Quebec City Film Festival	2017	Public Prize, Short Film	Crème de menthe with Jean-Marc E. Roy	Won	
Quebec City Film Festival	2017	Grand Prize, National Competition for Short Films	Crème de menthe with Jean-Marc E. Roy	Honored	
Regard: Saguenay International Short Film Festival	2015	Prix créativité	Blue Thunder (Bleu tonnerre) with Jean-Marc E. Roy	Won	
Regard: Saguenay International Short Film Festival	2015	Bourse de création régionale	Blue Thunder (Bleu tonnerre) with Jean-Marc E. Roy	Won	
