= The Human Factor (2019 film) =

- Official release poster
- Directed by: Dror Moreh
- Written by: Oron Adar; Dror Moreh
- Produced by: Teddy Leifer; Dror Moreh; Sol Goodman
- Cinematography: Kobi Zaig-Mendez
- Edited by: Oron Adar
- Music by: Eugene Levitas
- Production companies: Rise Films; DMP; Rabinowitz Fund; Tel Aviv Channel 8; Reshet
- Distributed by: Sony Pictures Classics
- Release dates: August 30, 2019 (Telluride); January 22, 2021 (United States)
- Running time: 108 minutes
- Countries: United States; Israel
- Language: English
- Box office: $42,812

The Human Factor is a 2019 documentary film directed by Dror Moreh. The film follows a thirty-year effort to secure peace in the Middle-East.

The film had its world premiere at the Telluride Film Festival on August 30, 2019. It was released in the United States on January 22, 2021, by Sony Pictures Classics.

== Premise ==
The epic behind-the-scenes story of the United States' 30-year effort to secure peace in the Middle East. Recounted from the unique perspective of the American mediators on the frontlines.

== Release ==
The film had its world premiere at the Telluride Film Festival on August 30, 2019. It also screened at the Hamptons International Film Festival on October 12, 2019, AFI Fest on November 17, 2019, and DOC NYC in November 2019. In January 2020, Sony Pictures Classics acquired distribution rights to the film in North America, Scandinavia, South Africa, the Benelux, Australia, New Zealand, Asia and airlines. It was released in the United States on January 22, 2021.

== Reception ==
=== Critical response ===
On review aggregator website Rotten Tomatoes, the film holds an approval rating of 96% based on 47 critic reviews, with an average rating of 7.8/10. The site's critical consensus reads, "A rare opportunity to look back at history being made, The Human Factor offers an engrossing behind-the-scenes look at efforts to end generations of bloodshed." Metacritic, which uses a weighted average, assigned the film a score of 78 out of 100, based on 14 critics, indicating "generally favorable" reviews.

Joe Morgenstern of The Wall Street Journal reviewed the film positively, stating "It's a deeply wise examination of statesmanship and leadership, or their egregious absence; a celebration of compromise as the indispensable element of diplomacy; and a stirring argument for the power of humanity." The Hollywood Reporter's Todd McCarthy called the film "A riveting look at a missed opportunity."

=== Accolades ===
Year	Organizations	Category	Nominee(s)	Result
2019	Hamptons International Film Festival	Best Film	The Human Factor	Nominated
