= Jean-Marc E. Roy =

Jean-Marc E. Roy is a Canadian film director and screenwriter from Saguenay, Quebec. He is most noted for Des histoires inventées, his 2018 documentary about filmmaker André Forcier, and Cardboard City (Ville Jacques-Carton), a 2025 hybrid docufiction film he co-directed with Forcier.

He has also co-directed several Canadian Screen Award and Prix Iris nominated short films with Philippe David Gagné, with whom he cofounded the independent film studio La Boîte de pickup in 2015.

== Filmography ==
- [bwa] - 2009, with Philippe David Gagné
- Patchwork - 2009, with Philippe David Gagné
- 35MPH (Vivre à 35 milles à l'heure) - 2010, with Philippe David Gagné and Dominic Leclerc
- Life and Death of Yul Brynner – 2011, with Philippe David Gagné
- Pick-Up: À la rencontre d'un bout du monde - 2011, with Philippe David Gagné
- Genèse – 2013
- Cowboy: Un rêve candien - 2013, with Philippe David Gagné
- Nevermind – 2014
- Puisqu'il le faut – 2015
- Blue Thunder (Bleu tonnerre) – 2015, with Philippe David Gagné
- Stone Makers (Carrière) – 2016
- Airs communs - 2016, with Philippe David Gagné
- Close-Up - 2017
- Crème de menthe – 2017, with Philippe David Gagné
- Black Forest (Forêt noire) – 2018, with Philippe David Gagné
- Des histoires inventées – 2018
- Cardboard City (Ville Jacques-Carton) – 2025, with André Forcier

== Awards ==
Award	Year	Category	Work	Result	Ref
Abitibi-Témiscamingue International Film Festival	2011	Prix Télé-Québec	Life and Death of Yul Brynner with Philippe David Gagné	Won	
Canadian Screen Awards	2016	Best Live Action Short Drama	Blue Thunder (Bleu tonnerre) with Philippe David Gagné	Nominated	
Canadian Screen Awards	2017	Best Short Documentary	Stone Makers (Carrière) with Colette Loumède, Denis McCready, Claudia Chabot	Nominated	
Canadian Screen Awards	2020	Best Live Action Short Drama	Black Forest (Forêt noire) with Philippe David Gagné, Julie Groleau	Nominated	
Gala Québec Cinéma	2016	Best Live Action Short Film	Blue Thunder (Bleu tonnerre) with Philippe David Gagné, Ménaîc Raoul, Gabrielle Tougas-Fréchette	Nominated	
Gala Québec Cinéma	2018	Best Live Action Short Film	Crème de menthe with Philippe David Gagné	Nominated	
Quebec City Film Festival	2017	Public Prize, Short Film	Crème de menthe with Philippe David Gagné	Won	
Quebec City Film Festival	2017	Grand Prize, National Competition for Short Films	Crème de menthe with Philippe David Gagné	Honored	
Regard: Saguenay International Short Film Festival	2015	Prix créativité	Blue Thunder (Bleu tonnerre) with Philippe David Gagné	Won	
Regard: Saguenay International Short Film Festival	2015	Bourse de création régionale	Blue Thunder (Bleu tonnerre) with Philippe David Gagné	Won	
