= Regard (film festival) =

Canadian short film festival

Coordinates: 48°24′22″N 71°14′52″W

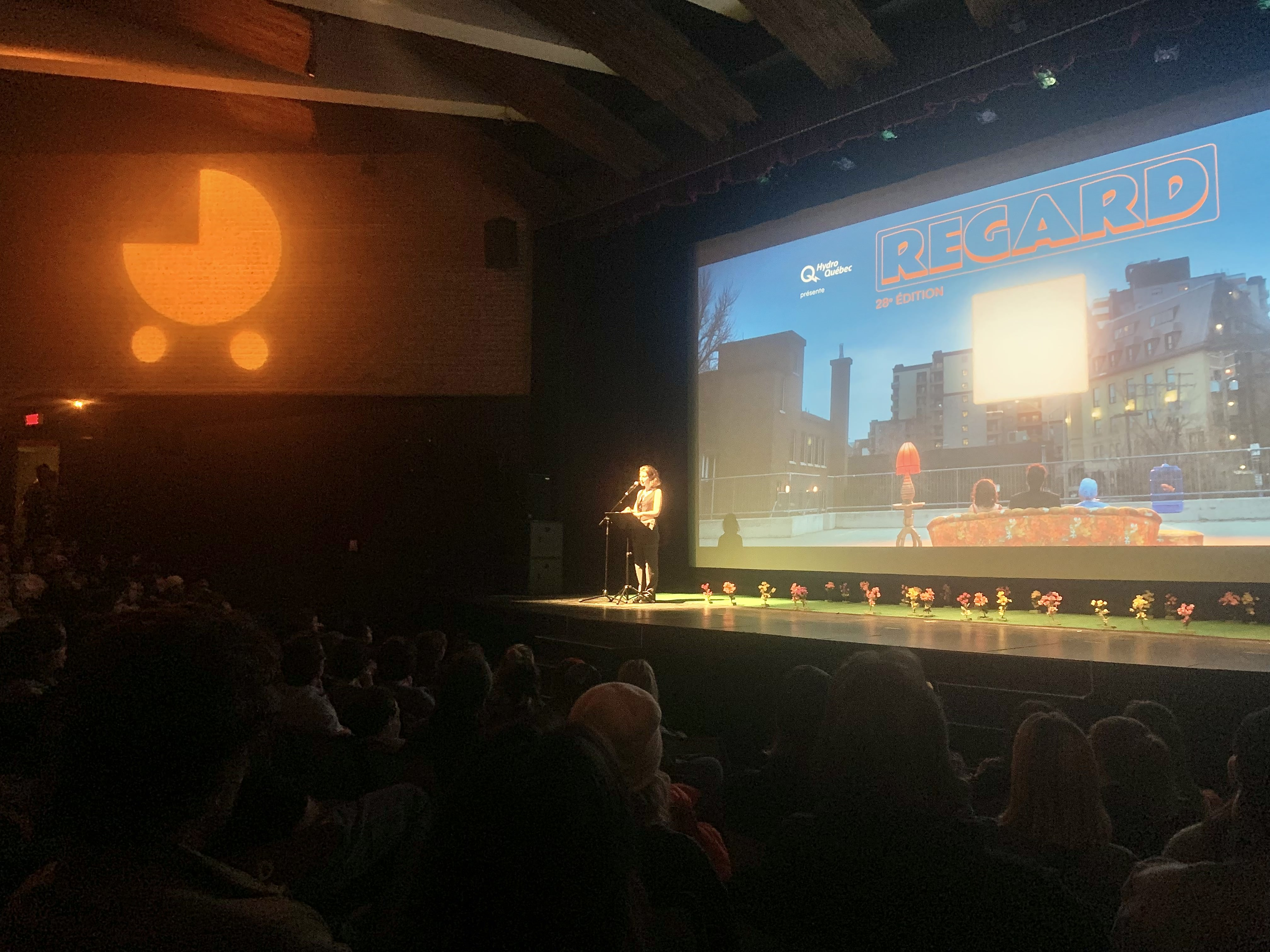
- 28th edition of Regard, 2024
- Location: Saguenay, Quebec, Canada
- Founded: 1995
- Most recent: 2025 (29th edition)
- Awards: Grand Prize, Canadian Grand Prize, Jury Prize
- No. of films: ≈ 200 short films/year
- Language: French, English
- Website: festivalregard.com
- March 18–22, 2026 (30th edition)

Regard – Saguenay International Short Film Festival (French: Festival Regard or Festival international du court métrage au Saguenay), also known as the Saguenay International Short Film Festival, or simply Regard (stylized as REGARD; lit. "Look"), is a short film festival taking place annually in March in the city of Saguenay, Quebec, Canada. Founded in 1995 by Caravane Films Productions, it is one of the largest film festivals dedicated exclusively to short films in North America, and serves as both a gateway to the Americas for international short cinema and a launch pad for Canadian filmmakers seeking international recognition.

The festival has been Academy Award-qualifying since 2017, meaning winners of its top prizes are automatically eligible for Oscar nominations in the short film categories. It is also recognized by the International Federation of Film Critics (FIPRESCI). The festival typically screens approximately 200 short films from over 50 countries during its five-day run and distributes over CAD$120,000 in prizes and grants to winning filmmakers.

Since 2024, Marie-Michèle Plante has served as the festival's general director.

== History ==
=== Founding and early years (1995–2001) ===
Regard was founded in 1995 by Éric Bachand, a recently graduated art student from the University of Quebec in Chicoutimi. Bachand conceived the idea for the festival while volunteering for the Festival du nouveau cinéma in Montreal.

The festival was initially called "Regard sur la relève du cinéma québécois" (lit. "Look on the next generation of Quebec cinema"), and was later renamed "Regard sur le court métrage au Saguenay" (lit. "Look on the short film in Saguenay") before adopting its current name. The first edition took place in the Le Ménestrel room of the Cégep de Chicoutimi; it screened both feature-length and short films and received an audience of approximately 30 people per projection.

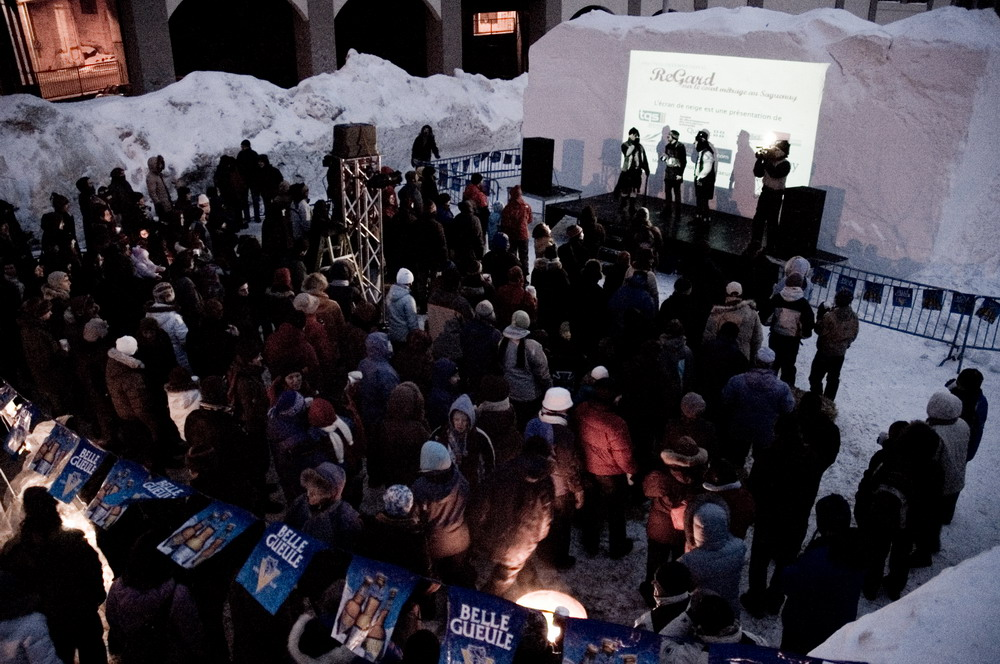
Film projection on a snow bank at Regard, 2001

In Regard's second year, filmmaker Sébastien Pilote—who would later become an acclaimed Quebec director known for films such as The Salesman (2011) and The Fireflies Are Gone (2018)—joined Bachand in developing the festival. Bachand and Pilote conceived of the festival as a cultural bridge between the cities of Jonquière and Chicoutimi, which were subsequently merged into the city of Saguenay in 2002. The two founders drew inspiration from the Clermont-Ferrand International Short Film Festival in France, as well as the Abitibi-Témiscamingue International Film Festival in Quebec.

=== Growth and development (2001–2016) ===
The 6th edition of Regard marked a pivotal transition when the festival became exclusively focused on short films, abandoning feature-length programming. The initial editions of the festival were also non-competitive, with awards being introduced at the 12th edition in 2008.

By the 10th edition in 2006, Regard had grown significantly, receiving 10,000 audience members. Under the leadership of general director Ian Gailer, the festival continued to expand, growing by approximately 4–5% annually through 2015.

In 2015, Marie-Elaine Riou succeeded Gailer as general director, bringing international experience from her work in Barcelona and fluency in five languages to the role.

=== International recognition (2017–present) ===
The year 2017 marked a significant milestone when two of the festival's awards—the Grand Prize and the Canadian Grand Prize—were designated as Academy Award-qualifying by the Academy of Motion Picture Arts and Sciences. This status means that films winning these prizes are automatically eligible for nomination for the Academy Award for Best Live Action Short Film, Best Documentary Short Film, or Best Animated Short Film.

That same year, Regard became the third North American festival—after the Palm Springs International Film Festival and the Toronto International Film Festival—to host a jury from the International Federation of Film Critics (FIPRESCI). The festival was also named one of the "25 Coolest Film Festivals in the World" by MovieMaker magazine.

The COVID-19 pandemic significantly impacted the festival. The 2020 edition was cancelled on its second day due to the pandemic's progression in Canada. The 2021 edition, celebrating the festival's 25th anniversary, was postponed to June and made innovative use of drive-in theaters and outdoor screenings.

In 2023, the 27th edition of Regard achieved record attendance with 30,000 audience members, cementing its position as the cultural event attracting the most tourists annually to the Saguenay region.

== Programming ==
=== Official Competition ===
The Official Competition is open to all Canadian and international short film directors and producers. Films must be under 40 minutes in length, with priority given to works completed after March of the previous year, independently-produced auteur films, and national, North American, and world premieres. All genres—fiction, animation, documentary, and experimental—are eligible.

=== Focus Competition ===
The Focus Competition encompasses several specialized sections:

- Tourner à tout prix! (Shoot No Matter What) – showcases films by promising Quebec filmmakers
- 100% Régions (Philippe Belley Award) – highlights regional filmmaking
- Americana – features first and second films from filmmakers across the Americas
- Short & Queer – LGBTQ+-focused programming
- Indigenous Perspectives (Alanis-Obomsawin Award) – celebrates Indigenous filmmakers

=== Youth Competition ===
The Youth Competition presents programming tailored to various age groups from preschool through high school:

- Regarderie – cultural outings for daycare centres
- P'tites vues (ages 3–7) – programs for preschool to 2nd grade
- Grandes vues (ages 8+) – programs for 3rd to 6th grade
- High school programs for junior and senior cycles
- #13-17 – teen-curated programming

The festival's youth section reaches approximately 12,000–17,000 students annually through school screenings.

=== Additional Programming ===
The festival also features carte blanche programs given to foreign festivals, retrospectives, panorama screenings, and various thematic programs. Special outdoor activities include the traditional sugaring-off party and community events in the "Ruelle du court métrage" (Short Film Alley).

== Short Film Market ==
Regard hosts Quebec's only short film market, an industry event that gathers approximately 400 professionals annually, including directors, producers, distributors, domestic and international buyers, journalists, and screenwriters. The market provides networking opportunities through discussion workshops, roundtables, forums, master classes, and a video library containing all films submitted to the festival. Activities are free and open to both professionals and the general public.

== Awards ==
The festival has been competitive since its 12th edition in 2008. As of 2025, 15 awards are presented:

=== Academy Award-Qualifying Awards ===
- Grand Prize – CAD$5,000 cash plus post-production services
- Canadian Grand Prize – CAD$5,000 cash plus production services

=== Jury Awards ===
- Jury Prize – CAD$3,000 cash plus post-production services
- Best Animation Short Film Award
- Best Documentary Short Film Award
- International FIPRESCI Critic's Award
- Quebec Critics Award (AQCC)

=== Focus Competition Awards ===
- Tourner à tout prix! Award (Shoot No Matter What)
- Philippe Belley Award (100% Régions)
- Americana Award
- Short & Queer Award
- Indigenous Perspectives Award (Alanis-Obomsawin Award)

=== Audience and Youth Awards ===
- Public Award – Official Competition
- Public Award – Focus Competition
- Best Youth Short Film

== Award winners ==
=== Grand Prize ===
The Grand Prize has been awarded since the 12th edition in 2008. It became Academy Award-qualifying in 2017.

Year	Edition	Film	Director(s)	Country
2008	12th	Don't Let It All Unravel	Sarah Cox	United Kingdom
2009	13th	Two Birds (Smáfuglar)	Rúnar Rúnarsson	Iceland
2010	14th	The Ballad of Marie Nord and Her Clients (Balladen om Marie Nord och hennes klienter)	Alexander Onofri	Sweden
2011	15th	Garagouz	Abdenour Zahzah	Algeria
2012	16th	Silent River	Anca Miruna Lazarescu	Germany, Romania
2013	17th	On Suffocation	Jenifer Malmqvist	Sweden
2014	18th	The Mass of Men	Gabriel Gauchet	United Kingdom
2015	19th	Listen	Hamy Ramezan, Rungano Nyoni	Finland, Zambia
2016	20th	Everything Will Be Okay (Alles wird gut)	Patrick Vollrath	Austria, Germany
2017	21st	Home	Daniel Mulloy	United Kingdom
2018	22nd	Black Line (Ligne Noire)	Mark Olexa, Francesca Scalisi	Switzerland
2019	23rd	Riviera	Jonas Schloesing	France
2020	24th	Atkurimas	Laurynas Bareiša	Lithuania
2021	25th	Free Fall	Emmanuel Tenenbaum	France
2022	26th	Vlekkloos	Emma Branderhorst	Netherlands
2023	27th	Natureza Humana	Mónica Lima	Portugal, Germany
2024	28th	Cross My Heart and Hope To Die	Sam Manacsa	Philippines
2025	29th	Shadows	Rand Beiruty	France, Jordan
2026	30th	A Shot at Art	Ilke Paddenburg	Netherlands

=== Canadian Grand Prize ===
The Canadian Grand Prize has been awarded since 2008, and is Academy Award-qualifying.

Year	Film	Director(s)	Country
2008	My Name Is Victor Gazon (Mon nom est Victor Gazon)	Patrick Gazé	Canada
2009	Rains (L'Ondée)	David Coquard-Dassault	Canada, France
2010	Danse Macabre	Pedro Pires	Canada
2011	Mokhtar	Halima Ouardiri	Canada
2012	The Near Future (Le futur proche)	Sophie Goyette	Canada
2013	Edmond Was a Donkey (Edmond était un âne)	Franck Dion	Canada, France
2014	An Extraordinary Person (Quelqu'un d'extraordinaire)	Monia Chokri	Canada
2015	On Cement (Sur le ciment)	Robin Aubert	Canada
2016	The Voice (La Voce)	David Uloth	Canada
2017	My Last Summer (Mon dernier été)	Claude Demers	Canada
2018	Fauve	Jérémy Comte	Canada
2019	Just Me and You (Juste moi et toi)	Sandrine Brodeur-Desrosiers	Canada
2020	Cayenne	Simon Gionet	Canada
2021	Like the Ones I Used to Know (Les Grandes Claques)	Annie St-Pierre	Canada
2022	Sikiitu	Gabriel Allard	Canada
2023	Thirty-Second Season (La trente-deuxième saison)	Charles-Émile Lafrance	Canada
2024	EarthWorm	Phillip Barker	Canada
2024	Losing Your Home (Juste un toit)	Emmanuel Rioux	Canada
2025	Orbits (Orbites)	Sarah Seené	Canada
2026	A Wolf in the Suburbs	Amélie Hardy	Canada

=== Jury Prize ===
Year	Film	Director(s)	Country
2018	Sovdagari	Tamta Cabrichidze	Georgia
2019	A Sister (Une sœur)	Delphine Girard	Belgium
2020	Postcards from the End of the World	Konstantinos Antonopoulos	Greece
2021	White Eye	Tomer Shushan	Israel
2022	Warsha	Dania Bdeir	France, Lebanon
2023	Invincible	Vincent René-Lortie	Canada
2024	An Example (Et eksempel: Dem på gulvet)	Selma Sunniva	Denmark
2025	What If They Bomb Here Tonight	Samir Syriani	Lebanon
2026	Les Âmes du Fouta	Alpha Diallo	France, Senegal

=== Best Animation Short Film ===
Year	Film	Director(s)	Country
2009	Skhizein	Jérémy Clapin	France
2010	Logorama	François Alaux, Ludovic Houplain, Hervé de Crécy	France
2011	White Tape	Michelle and Uri Kranot	Denmark
2012	Not presented		
2013	Not presented		
2014	Supervenus	Frédéric Doazan	France
2015	Hipopotamy	Piotr Dumala	Poland
2016	Sunday Lunch (Le repas dominical)	Céline Devaux	France
2017	Cipka	Renata Gasiorowska	Poland
2018	The Burden (Min Börda)	Niki Lindroth von Bahr	Sweden
2019	Riviera	Jonas Schloesing	France
2020	Girl in the Hallway	Valerie Barnhart	Canada
2021	The Passerby	Pieter Coudyzer	Belgium
2022	Night	Ahmad Saleh	Jordan, Palestine, Germany, Qatar
2023	Ice Merchants	João Gonzalez	Portugal, United Kingdom, France
2024	A Kind of Testament	Stephen Vuillemin	France
2025	Sans voix	Samuel Patthey	Switzerland
2026	Boundaries	Seun Yee	South Korea

=== Best Documentary Short Film ===
Year	Film	Director(s)	Country
2010	Wagah	Supriyo Sen	India
2011	Smolarze	Piotr Zlotorowicz	Poland
2012	Flying Anne	Catherine Van Campen	Netherlands
2013	Story for the Modlins	Sergio Oksman	Spain
2014	Jack, vétéran du Vietnam	François Pesant	Canada
2015	Un royaume démémage	Terence Chotard, Raphael J. Dostie	Canada
2016	Bacon and God's Wrath	Sol Friedman	Canada
2017	The Marmot's Cry (Le cri de la marmotte)	Colin Nixon	Canada
2018	Rewind Forward	Justin Stoneham	Switzerland
2019	Suspension d'audience	Nina Marissiaux	Belgium
2020	All Cats Are Grey in the Dark (Nachts sind alle katzen grau)	Lasse Linder	Switzerland
2021	Joe Buffalo	Amar Chebib	Canada
2022	Nuisance Bear	Jack Weisman, Gabriela Osio Vanden	Canada
2023	Buurman Abdi	Douwe Dijkstra	Netherlands
2024	O Gün Bu Gündür, Uçuyorum	Aylin Gökmen	Switzerland
2024	Our Grandmother the Inlet	Jaime Leigh Gianopoulos, Kayah George	Canada
2025	Who Loves the Sun	Arshia Shakiba	Canada
2026	Ndjimu	Petna Ndaliko Katondolo	Democratic Republic of the Congo

=== FIPRESCI International Critics' Prize ===
Awarded to a Canadian filmmaker in the Official Competition by a jury from the International Federation of Film Critics.

Year	Film	Director(s)	Country
2017	An Other (Un autre)	Nils Caneele	Canada
2018	Go Play Outside (Va jouer dehors)	Adib Alkhalidey	Canada
2019	The Colour of Your Lips (La couleur de tes lèvres)	Annick Blanc	Canada
2020	Nitrate	Yousra Benziane	Canada
2021	Ain't No Time for Women (Y'a pas d'heure pour les femmes)	Sarra El Abed	Canada
2022	Nuisance Bear	Jack Weisman, Gabriela Osio Vanden	Canada
2023	Madeleine	Raquel Sancinetti	Canada
2024	Extras	Marc-Antoine Lemire	Canada
2025	Orbits (Orbites)	Sarah Seené	Canada
2026	A Wolf in the Suburbs	Amélie Hardy	Canada

=== AQCC Quebec Critics' Award ===
Year	Film	Director(s)	Country
2018	Mother (Madre)	Rodrigo Sorogoyen	Spain
2019	Le champ de maïs	Sandhya Suri	France, United Kingdom, India
2020	The Manila Lover	Johanna Pyykkö	Philippines, Norway
2021	Maalbeek	Ismaël Joffroy Chandoutis	France
2022	Soft Animals	Renée Zhan	United Kingdom
2023	Se dit d'un cerf qui quitte son bois	Salomé Crickx	Belgium
2024	The Miracle	Nienke Deutz	Belgium, Netherlands, France
2025	O	Rúnar Rúnarsson	Iceland, Sweden
2026	Sixty-Seven Milliseconds (Soixante-sept millisecondes)	Fleury Fontaine	France

=== Tourner à tout prix! (Shoot No Matter What) Award ===
Awarded to an independent Quebec short film produced without institutional financial assistance.

Year	Film	Director(s)
2008	Un an déjà	Claudia Chabot
2009	Chère Rosalia	Aude Maltais-Landry, Iphigénie Marcoux-Fortier, Karine Van Ameringen
2010	Crudités	Lawrence Côté-Collins
2011	Fuck That	Lawrence Côté-Collins
2012	Il ne fait pas soleil	Xavier Beauchesne-Rondeau
2013	Ô Divin Bovin	Alexandre Ruffin
2014	Lespouère	Moïse Marcoux-Chabot
2015	Le Truck	Sandrine Brodeur-Desrosiers
2016	Papa Trouble	Cécile Gariépy
2017	Quand je serai parti	Justin Richard-Dostie
2018	L'Appartement	Justine Gauthier
2019	Le déménagement	Gabriel Vilandré
2020	Mon père, Elvis	Éric Piccoli
2021	L'Expiration	Joris Cottin
2022	Do Butterflies Remember Being Caterpillars?	Caraz
2023	Bergen, Norvège	Alexia Roc
2024	Unclean	Simon Chouinard
2025	Ma sœur	Rosalie Pelletier
2026	Fan	Philippe Berthelet

=== Americana Award ===
Awarded to an emerging filmmaker from the Americas.

Year	Film	Director(s)	Country
2020	Quebramar	Cris Lyra	Brazil
2021	Cumbres y cenizas	Fernando Criollo	Peru
2022	Pilona	July Naters	Peru
2023	Entre dos islas	Hideki Nakazaki	Cuba, Spain
2024	AliEN0089	Valeria Hofmann	Chile, Argentina
2025	Servicio necrológico para usted	María Salafranca	Cuba
2026	Niña Chilapa	Juana Lotero López	Colombia

=== Philippe Belley Award (100% Régions) ===
Awarded to a filmmaker based outside of Montreal, honouring the memory of Saguenay filmmaker Philippe Belley.

Year	Film	Director(s)
2021	Girls Shouldn't Walk Alone at Night (Les filles ne marchent pas seules la nuit)	Katerine Martineau
2022	Rencontre avec Robert Dole	François Harvey
2023	Au bout du monde	William Pagé
2025	Interurbain	Marc-Olivier Huard
2026	Au cœur du remous	Mélanie Saint-Germain

=== Short & Queer Award ===
Year	Film	Director(s)	Country
2023	Blond Night (Nuit blonde)	Gabrielle Demers	Canada
2024	Dildotectonics	Tomás Paula Marques	Portugal
2025	The Eating of an Orange	May Kindred-Boothby	United Kingdom
2026	Bleifrei 95	Tina Muffler, Emma Hütt	Germany, Austria

=== Indigenous Perspectives Award (Alanis Obomsawin Award) ===
Year	Film	Director(s)	Country
2025	Dipped in Black (Marungka tjalatjunu)	Derik Lynch, Matthew Thorne	Australia
2026	The Great Cherokee Grandmother	Anthony Sneed	United States

=== Public Award – Official Competition ===
Year	Film	Director(s)	Country
2008	J'viendrai t'chercher	Sophie Dupuis	Canada
2009	Belle maman	Sébastien Trahan, Simon Lamontagne	Canada
2010	Toute ma vie	Pierre Ferrière	France
2011	Born Sweet	Cynthia Wade	United States
2012	L'Accordeur	Olivier Treiner	France
2013	Délivre-moi	Antoine Duquesne	Belgium
2014	An Extraordinary Person (Quelqu'un d'extraordinaire)	Monia Chokri	Canada
2015	Aubabe	Mauro Carraro	Switzerland
2016	The Voice (La voce)	David Uloth	Canada
2017	Law of Lamb (La laine sur le dos)	Lotfi Achour	France, Tunisia
2018	Trois pages	Roger Gariépy	Canada
2019	Nursery Rhymes	Tom Noakes	Australia
2020	La petite Floride	Tim Bouvette	Canada
2021	Pharmakon	Jean-Martin Gagnon	Canada
2022	Suzanne & Chantal	Rachel Graton	Canada
2023	An Avocado Pit	Ary Zara	Portugal
2024	Extras	Marc-Antoine Lemire	Canada
2025	The Punk of Natashquan (Le punk de Natashquan)	Nicolas Lachapelle	Canada
2026	Diego	Melissa Silveira	France

=== Public Award – Parallel/Focus Competition ===
Year	Film	Director(s)	Country
2022	A Shore Away (L'Autre rive)	Gaëlle Graton	Canada
2023	Bonne fête, le désordre!	Jean-Martin Gagnon, Guillaume Harvey	Canada
2024	Audio y el Caimán	Andres I. Estrada	Canada, Venezuela
2025	Le patenteux	Maude Petel-Légaré	Canada

=== Best Youth Short Film ===
Year	Film	Director(s)	Country
2016	The Painter of Jalouzzi	Bryn Moser, David Darg	Haiti
2017	Blind Vaysha	Theodore Ushev	Canada
2018	Fauve	Jérémy Comte	Canada
2019	Irony	Radheya Jegatheva	Australia
2020	Poustet Draka	Martin Smatana	Poland, Czech Republic, Slovakia
2021	Only a Child	Simone Giampaolo	Switzerland
2023	Death to the Bikini! (À mort le bikini !)	Justine Gauthier	Canada
2024	My Name Is Edgar and I Have a Cow	Filip Diviak	Slovakia, Czech Republic
2025	Game Rules	Christian Zetterberg	Sweden
2026	La Légende du Colibri	Morgan Devos	France

=== Best Quebec Youth Short Film ===
Year	Film	Director(s)	Country
2026	C'est ma sœur	Zoé Pelchat	Canada

=== Bourse à la création du Saguenay ===
A prize for local filmmakers from the Saguenay—Lac-Saint-Jean region.

Year	Film	Director(s)
2011	Madame Dubois et les cyclo-machines	Claudia Chabot
2012	Haut-Fond prince	Martin Rodolphe Villeneuve
2013	Award not presented	
2014	Joggin	Yohann Gasse
2015	Blue Thunder (Bleu tonnerre)	Jean-Marc E. Roy, Philippe David Gagné
2016	Le Passage	Alexa Tremblay-Francoeur
2017	Brutes Are Afraid of Silence (Le silence fait peur aux brutes)	Étienne Boulanger
2018	Crème de menthe	Jean-Marc E. Roy, Philippe David Gagné
2019	À l'aube	Anaë Bilodeau, Louis-Pierre Cossette
2020	Playeros: travailleurs des plages	Alexandre Beaumont-Vachon
2021	Girls Shouldn't Walk Alone at Night (Les filles ne marchent pas seules la nuit)	Katerine Martineau

=== Best Direction ===
Award presented from 2008 to 2017 for the best direction in a Quebec short film.

Year	Film	Director(s)
2008	Madame Tutli-Putli	Chris Lavis, Maciek Szczerbowski
2009	Beyond the Walls (La Battue)	Guy Édoin
2010	The Delian Mode	Kara Blake
2011	Opasatica	Éric Morin
2012	Solar Wind (Vent solaire)	Ian Lagarde
2013	Struggle (Faillir)	Sophie Dupuis
2014	The Cut (La Coupe)	Geneviève Dulude-De Celles
2015	Nan Lakou Kanaval	Kaveh Nabatian
2016	Overpass (Viaduc)	Patrice Laliberté
2017	The Beep Test (La Course navette)	Maxime Aubert

=== Best Screenplay ===
Award presented from 2008 to 2017 for the best screenplay in a Quebec short film.

Year	Film	Director(s)
2008	J'viendrai t'chercher	Sophie Dupuis
2009	Rosa, Rosa	Félix Dufour-Laperrière
2010	Snow Hides the Shade of Fig Trees (La neige cache l'ombre des figuiers)	Samer Najari
2011	Light in the Night (Lumière dans la nuit)	Pierre-Luc Lafontaine
2012	Surveillant	Yan Giroux
2013	Edmond Was a Donkey (Edmond était un âne)	Franck Dion
2014	Remember Me (Mémorable moi)	Jean-François Asselin
2015	Award not presented	
2016	Jean-Marc Vallée	Annie St-Pierre
2017	Comme les dinosaures	Emilie Rosas

=== Coup de cœur BravoFACT ===
Year	Film	Director(s)
2008	I Met the Walrus	John Raskin

== Notable alumni ==
Several filmmakers have launched or advanced their careers through Regard before achieving international recognition:

- Meryam Joobeur – Her short film Born in the Maelstrom (2017) screened at Regard. Her subsequent short Brotherhood (2018) was nominated for the Academy Award for Best Live Action Short Film at the 92nd Academy Awards, and her feature debut Who Do I Belong To (2024) premiered at the Berlinale.
- Charlotte Le Bon – The actress-turned-director made award-winning shorts before her feature directorial debut Falcon Lake (2022) premiered at the Cannes Directors' Fortnight.
- Sébastien Pilote – Co-founded the festival in its second year and went on to become an acclaimed Quebec filmmaker, with works including The Salesman (2011) and Maria Chapdelaine (2021).
- Annick Blanc and Jean-François Leblanc – Made award-winning shorts at Regard before transitioning to feature filmmaking.
- Caroline Monnet – Her experimental short Pidikwe (2025), mixing Indigenous traditional and contemporary dance, was highlighted at the festival.

== Organization ==
The festival is produced by Caravane Films Productions, a non-profit organization with the mission of producing Regard and its related activities. The organization contributes to film education for youth, promotes and disseminates short films to the general public, facilitates professional networking, and supports film creation.

=== Educational outreach ===
Through its Caravane du court métrage (Short Film Caravan) program, the organization conducts year-round school tours, bringing short film screenings and cinema workshops to thousands of elementary and high school students across the Saguenay–Lac-Saint-Jean region.

=== Leadership ===
The festival has had several general directors:

- Ian Gailer (until 2015)
- Marie-Elaine Riou (2015–2022)
- Marie-Michèle Plante (2024–present)

== Honorary presidents ==
Since 1998, the festival has featured honorary presidents (présidents d'honneur), typically notable figures from Quebec cinema and television:

- 1998–2001: David La Haye
- 2002: Robert Brouillette
- 2003: Germain Houde
- 2004: Geneviève Brouillette
- 2005: Jean-Nicolas Verreault
- 2006: Isabelle Blais
- 2007: Sylvain Marcel
- 2008: Rémi-Pierre Paquin
- 2009: Julie Le Breton
- 2010: Anne-Marie Cadieux
- 2011: Simon-Olivier Fecteau
- 2012: Sophie Cadieux
- 2013: Luc Picard
- 2014: Sébastien Huberdeau
- 2015: Sandrine Bisson
- 2016: Anne-Élisabeth Bossé
- 2017: Émile Proulx-Cloutier
- 2018: Sarah-Jeanne Labrosse
- 2019: Rémy Girard
- 2020: Guillaume Lambert
- 2021: Louis-David Morasse
- 2022: Charlotte Aubin
- 2023: Florence Longpré
- 2024: Étienne Galloy
- 2025: Marilyn Castonguay
- 2026: Pier-Luc Funk

== Cultural impact ==
Regard has become the cultural event attracting the most tourists annually to the Saguenay region. The festival is known for its distinctive atmosphere, combining the warmth of a sugar shack with the excitement of a film festival despite the challenging winter conditions—with temperatures well below zero and snowbanks reaching several feet high during the March event.

In 2021, the City of Saguenay allocated a budget of CAD$25,000 to Caravane Films Productions for the construction of a creation residence in memory of Philippe Belley, a Saguenay filmmaker who died in 2021 while training for a crossing of Lac Saint-Jean. The Philippe Belley Award at the festival now honors his memory.

== See also ==
- List of film festivals in Canada
- Clermont-Ferrand International Short Film Festival
- Cinema of Quebec
- Short film
