= Abitibi-Témiscamingue International Film Festival =

Film festival in Quebec, Canada

Abitibi-Témiscamingue International Film Festival Festival du cinéma international en Abitibi-Témiscamingue
- Frequency: Annual
- Locations: Rouyn-Noranda, Quebec, Canada
- Years active: 40
- Inaugurated: 1982
- Website: Official website

The Abitibi-Témiscamingue International Film Festival (French: Festival du cinéma international en Abitibi-Témiscamingue) is an annual film festival which takes place in Rouyn-Noranda, Quebec, Canada. It presents a program of Canadian and international films in late October and early November each year.

The festival was launched in 1982. It was an expansion of the Semaine du cinéma régional, a festival launched in 1977 which concentrated exclusively on films made in the Abitibi-Témiscamingue region.

Festival programmer Anne-France Thibault has compared it to the Cinéfest Sudbury International Film Festival, in that both festivals became popular cultural events and important stops on the Canadian film festival circuit despite having been launched in blue-collar mining communities removed from Canada's traditional cultural meccas.

While the COVID-19 pandemic in Canada forced nearly all other Canadian film festivals to either cancel their 2020 programs or shift to an online streaming model, the Abitibi-Témiscamingue region's very low rate of COVID-19 cases made it one of the few film festivals in the country that was able to hold physical screenings. Despite the reduced risk, social distancing protocols, including mandatory masks, sanitizer stations and reduced audience sizes, were still maintained for audience safety.

== Awards ==
=== Grand Prix Hydro-Québec ===
The Grand Prix Hydro-Québec is presented to the film that was voted the most popular by audiences.

Year	Film	Director	Ref
1983	The Taste of Water (De smaak van water)	Orlow Seunke	
1984	The Dog Who Stopped the War (La Guerre des tuques)	André Melançon	
1985	Rocking Silver	Erik Clausen	
1986	Bach and Broccoli (Bach et Bottine)	André Melançon	
1987	Night Zoo (Un zoo la nuit)	Jean-Claude Lauzon	
1988	Salut Victor	Anne Claire Poirier	
1989	Jesus of Montreal (Jésus de Montréal)	Denys Arcand	
1990	Princes in Exile	Giles Walker	
1991	L'Homme de rêve	Robert Ménard	
1992	Anna's Garden (Le jardin d'Anna)	Alain Chartrand	
1993	The Engagement (Les Fiancés de la tour Eiffel)	Gilles Blais	
1994	To Live	Zhang Yimou	
1995	Water Child (L'Enfant d'eau)	Robert Ménard	
1996	The Eighth Day (Le huitième jour)	Jaco Van Dormael	
1997	Marius and Jeannette	Robert Guédiguian	
1998	Life Is Beautiful (La vita è bella)	Roberto Benigni	
1999	Memories Unlocked (Souvenirs intimes)	Jean Beaudin	
2000	Shower	Zhang Yang	
2001	Italian for Beginners	Lone Scherfig	
2002	Chaos and Desire (La Turbulence des fluides)	Manon Briand	
2003	Strange Gardens (Effroyables jardins)	Jean Becker	
2004	Villa Paranoia	Erik Clausen	
2005	Merry Christmas (Joyeux Noël)	Christian Carion	
2006	The Little Book of Revenge (Le Guide de la petite vengeance)	Jean-François Pouliot	
2006	April in Love (Avril)	Gérald Hustache-Mathieu	
2007	Emma's Bliss	Sven Taddicken	
2008	Trisomie 21: Le défi Pérou	Lisette Marcotte	
2009	The Over the Hill Band (Meisjes)	Geoffrey Enthoven	
2010	Oxygen (Adem)	Hans Van Nuffel	
2011	Monsieur Lazhar	Philippe Falardeau	
2012	What's in a Name? (Le Prénom)	Alexandre de La Patellière and Matthieu Delaporte	
2013	Time of My Life (Tot altijd)	Nic Balthazar	
2014	Whiplash	Damien Chazelle	
2015	Brooklyn	John Crowley	
2016	Maudie	Aisling Walsh	
2017	Mr. Stein Goes Online (Un profil pour deux)	Stéphane Robelin	
2018	Woman at War	Benedikt Erlingsson	
2019	The Wolfdogs (Les chiens-loups)	Dominic Leclerc	
2020	Heroic Losers (La odisea de los Giles)	Sebastián Borensztein	
2021	Forgotten We'll Be (El olvido que seremos)	Fernando Trueba	
2022	You Will Remember Me (Tu te souviendras de moi)	Éric Tessier	
2023	Tell Me Why These Things Are So Beautiful (Dis-moi pourquoi ces choses sont si belles)	Lyne Charlebois	
2024	Prodigieuses	Frédéric Potier, Valentin Potier	
2025	A Place for Her (La maison des femmes)	Mélisa Godet	

=== Prix Crave ===
The Prix Crave, formerly the Télébec Prize, is a juried award presented to a film judged as the best short or mid-length film of the festival.

Year	Film	Director	Ref
1985	Le Film d'Arianne	Josée Beaudet	
1986	Sonia	Paule Baillargeon	
1987	The Man Who Planted Trees (L'homme qui plantait des arbres)	Frédéric Back	
1988	Sortie 234	Michel Langlois	
1989	L'Humeur à l'humour	Nicole Giguère, Michèle Pérusse	
1990	Nuits d'Afrique	Catherine Martin	
1991	67 bis, boulevard Lannes	Jean-Claude Labrecque	
1992	L'Année qui change la vie	Suzanne Guy	
1993	Ménage	Pierre Salvadori	
1994	Act Naturally (Gull og grønne skoger)	Harald Zwart	
1995	Yoidore Jirohachi	Tsukuru Imanishi	
1996	35 Aside	Damien O'Donnell	
1997	Ernest and the Light (Ernst og Lyset)	Tomas Villum Jensen	
1998	No Problem	Eva Colmers	
1999	Kuproquo	Jean-François Rivard	
2000	Echo	Frédéric Roullier-Gall	
2001	Il parle avec les loups	Carlos Ferrand Zavala	
2002	Tiro de gracia	Mario Mandujano, Jesus Ochoa	
2003	Merci	Christine Rabette	
2004	7:35 de la mañana	Nacho Vigalondo	
2005	Un charter pour les étoiles	Philippe Levasseur	
2006	Bawke	Hisham Zaman	
2007	Salvador	Abdelatif Hwidar	
2008	Next Floor	Denis Villeneuve	
2009	Léger problème	Hélène Florent	
2010	Beast	Lars Pedersen Arendt	
2011	L'Accordeur	Olivier Treiner	
2012	Curfew	Shawn Christensen	
2013	Penny Dreadful	Shane Atkinson	
2014	Life's a Bitch (Toutes des connes)	François Jaros	
2015	Père	Lotfi Achour	
2016	Stanley Vollant: De Compostelle à Kuujjuaq	Simon C. Vaillancourt	
2017	Baggage (Bagages)	Paul Tom	
2018	Trois pages	Roger Gariépy	
2019	Le Défi	Mélissa Major	
2020	Shooting Star (Comme une comète)	Ariane Louis-Seize	
2021	Still Fighting (Se battre encore)	Arthur Lecouturier	
2022	Ma gueule	Thibaut Wohlfahrt, Grégory Carnoli	
2023	Making Babies (Faire un enfant)	Eric K. Boulianne	
2024	The Little Shopping Trolley (Le petit panier à roulettes)	Laurence Ly	
2025	La mort	Jesús Martinez	

=== Prix Télé-Québec ===
The Télé-Québec Volet Espace Court Prize is an audience award presented to the short film by a Quebec director voted most popular with audiences.

Year	Film	Director	Ref
2005	Radio	Patrick Boivin	
2006	Terreur au 3918	Mathieu Fontaine	
2007	Le petit terrorisme	Pierre-Mathieu Fortin	
2008	Chronos	Kristian Manchester	
2009	Danse Macabre	Pedro Pires	
2010	La Guérison	Louis-Thomas Pelletier	
2011	Life and Death of Yul Brynner	Jean-Marc E. Roy, Philippe David Gagné	
2012	La Faim	François Charette	
2013	Remember Me (Mémorable moi)	Jean-François Asselin	
2014	Little Brother (Petit frère)	Rémi St-Michel	
2015	Un roadtrip à l’envers	Pierre-Étienne Bordeleau	
2016	Une formalité	Pierre-Marc Drouin, Simon Lamarre-Ledoux	
2017	Garage at Night (Garage de soir)	Daniel Daigle	
2018	Lunar-Orbit Rendezvous	Mélanie Charbonneau	
2019	Le Pigeon	William Mazzoleni	
2020	Found Me	David Findlay	
2021	Opération Carcajou	Nicolas Krief	
2022	The Temple (Le Temple)	Alain Fournier	
2023	Death to the Bikini! (À mort le bikini!)	Justine Gauthier	
2024	Wild Flowers (Les Fleurs sauvages)	Rodolphe Saint-Gelais, Thierry Sirois	
2025	The Punk of Natashquan (Le punk de Natashquan)	Nicolas Lachapelle	

=== TVA Animation Prize ===
The TVA Animation Prize is an audience award presented to the most popular animated film. The award is most commonly given to shorts, but animated feature films are also eligible if screened at the festival.

Year	Film	Director	Ref
1988	The Cat Came Back	Cordell Barker	
1989	Juke-Bar	Martin Barry	
1990	Eternity	Sheryl Sardina	
1991	Light & Heavy and Surprise	John Lasseter, Andrew Stanton	
1992	Adam	Peter Lord	
1993	The Wrong Trousers	Nick Park	
1994	Bob's Birthday	Alison Snowden, David Fine	
1995	Pat & Mat: The Billiards	Lubomír Beneš	
1996	A Close Shave	Nick Park	
1997	Puss in Boots (Кот в сапогах)	Garri Bardin	
1998	Ludovic: The Snow Gift	Co Hoedeman	
1999	Kirikou and the Sorceress (Kirikou et la sorcière)	Michel Ocelot	
2000	Media	Pavel Koutsky	
2001	The Shark and the Piano	Gabriele Pennacchioli	
2002	Trim Time	Gil Alkabetz	
2003	Oïo	Simon Goulet	
2004	Panthoffelhelden	Suzanne Seidel	
2005	Wallace & Gromit: The Curse of the Were-Rabbit	Steve Box, Nick Park	
2006	Azur & Asmar: The Princes' Quest	Michel Ocelot	
2007	Lapsus	Juan Pablo Zaramella	
2008	Mia and the Migoo (Mia et le Migou)	Jacques-Rémy Girerd	
2009	The Happy Duckling	Gili Dolev	
2010	Bob	Harry Fast, Jacob Frey	
2011	En la opéra	Juan Pablo Zaramella	
2012	Ernest & Celestine	Stéphane Aubier, Vincent Patar, Benjamin Renner	
2013	Beerbug	Ander Mendia	
2014	Bus Story (Histoires de bus)	Tali Prévost	
2015	Tigres à la queue leu leu	Benoît Chieux	
2016	Changeover	Mehdi Alibeygi	
2017	The Jungle Bunch (Les As de la jungle)	David Alaux	
2018	Animal Behaviour	Alison Snowden, David Fine	
2019	Tangle	Malileh Gholamzade	
2020	Athleticus: Une patinoire pour deux	Nicolas Deveaux	
2021	Migrants	Hugo Caby, Zoé Devise, Antoine Dupriez, Aubin Kubiak, Lucas Lermytte	
2022	Canary	Pierre-Hugues Dallaire, Benoit Therriault	
2023	Pig	Jorn Leeuwering	
2024	Maybe Elephants (Peut-être des éléphants)	Torill Kove	
2025	D.S. Al Coda	Louis Cocquet, Rachel Cuvilliez, Emma Feret, Florian Lecocq, François Mainguet, Jérémy Trochet, Maxime Wattrelos	

=== Médiafilm Robert-Claude Bérubé Prize ===
The Médiafilm Robert-Claude Bérubé Prize is presented to a film distinguished by themes of moral, social and ethical values.

Year	Film	Director	Ref
2005	Merry Christmas (Joyeux Noël)	Christian Carion	
2006	Azur & Asmar: The Princes' Quest	Michel Ocelot	
2007	Michou d'Auber	Thomas Gilou	
2008	Trisomie 21 / Le défi Pérou	Lisette Marcotte	
2009	The Legacy (La Donation)	Bernard Émond	
2010	Of Gods and Men (Des hommes et des dieux)	Xavier Beauvois	
2011	Monsieur Lazhar	Philippe Falardeau	
2012	All That You Possess (Tout ce que tu possèdes)	Bernard Émond	
2013	Offline	Peter Monsaert	
2014	Geronimo	Tony Gatlif	
2015	Hotel La Louisiane	Michel La Veaux	
2016	Tuktuq	Robin Aubert	
2017	Burn Out, or The Voluntary Servitude (Burn Out ou La Servitude Volontaire)	Michel Jetté	
2018	Happy Face	Alexandre Franchi	
2019	Papicha	Mounia Meddour	
2020	Los Lobos	Samuel Kishi Leopo	
2021	France	Bruno Dumont	
2022	Boy from Heaven	Tarik Saleh	
2023	Atikamekw Suns (Soleils Atikamekw)	Chloé Leriche	
2024	Souleymane's Story (L'Histoire de Souleymane)	Boris Lojkine	
2025	Dossier 137	Dominik Moll	

=== Prix SPIRA/Vital ===
The Prix Vital, presented for the first time in 2019 as Prix SPIRA before adopting its current name in 2023, is a juried award for short films, whose prize is $10,000 in equipment and post-production services toward a future project.

Year	Film	Director	Ref
2019	I'll End Up in Jail (Je finirai en prison)	Alexandre Dostie	
2020	Regret	Santiago Meng	
2021	Like the Ones I Used to Know (Les Grandes claques)	Annie St-Pierre	
2022	Municipal Relaxation Module	Matthew Rankin	
2023	A Kind of Testament	Stephen Vuillemin	
2024	Mercenaire	Pier-Philippe Chevigny	

=== Relève Desjardins ===
The Relève Desjardins is a $2,000 bursary presented for short local films made by students at the Cégep de l'Abitibi-Témiscamingue and the Université du Québec en Abitibi-Témiscamingue.

Year	Film	Director	Ref
2008	Un pick-up à Rouyn – Carnet de voyage de Liu Ben	Julien Pierre Arsenault, Marika Jacob, Maude Labrecque-Denis, Simon Lapierre, David Marcotte, Jérémie Monderie-Larouche, Frédérick Pelletier, Jean-Robert Simard	
2009	Chlorophylle	Valérie Gauron, Marika Jacob, Simon Lapierre, Qin Wang, Yun Wang, Yi Yang, Xiao-Xu Xhu	
2010	Keep on Trucking	Rémi Adam-Richer, Alex Beauchemin	
2011	Robin dans la lune	Martine Gauthier-Vallières, Christina Huard, Annie Roussel	
2012	Lutherie sauvage	Andréane Boulanger, Jean-François Perron	
2013	Pour l’amour de la boxe	Marion Gasqui, Antoine Hache	
2014	Contribution volontaire	Hélène Théberge	
2015	Vie et mort d’un objet usuel	Simon Descôteaux, Valentin Foch, Martin Laroche, Gabriel Tardif	
2016	Octobre	Alison Fortin, Samy Girard, Vicky Lavoie	
2017	Mélisse et Citronnelle	Alex Alisich	
2017	Fidèle	Sophie Chaffaut, Jan Declerck	
2018	Je déteste ma vie	Adam Moreau, Simon Roberge, Shany Lanoix	
2018	Réflexion	Cyprien Jeancolas	
2019	M. Richard	Didier Belzile, Roxanne St-Arneault	
2019	Crise de calme	Camille Corbeil, Mélodie Charbonneau-Demers, Ariane Lafrenière	
2020	Drought	Mia Salera, Félix Caouette	
2020	L’apocalypse confortable	Antoine Girard	
2021	En 8 temps	Magali Ouimet	
2021	La livraison	Maxim-Olivier Lavallée	
2022	A Lost Child	Max Spiegel	
2022	Toxique	Anahée Brousseau	
2023	Quitter le jardin	Mathis Anger, Alec Gendron	
2023	Psyché	Léonie Beusquart	
2024	Corrosion	Manon Lefébure	
2024	Silentium	Alex Nolan	
2025	Parano	Elsa Aubin, Danik Bolduc, Thomas Loiselle	
2025	La vierge de fer	Maé Pozzolo, Léo Salaun	

=== Prix Fonds Bell ===
Prize for web series.

Year	Film	Director	Ref
2021	Je voudrais qu’on m’efface	Éric Piccoli	
2021	Meilleur avant	Laura Bergeron, Maxime Robin	
2022	Caresses magiques	Lori Malépart-Traversy	
2022	Complètement Lycée	Alec Pronovost	
2023	Maisonneuve	Jean-Martin Gagnon	
2023	Symphone pathétique	Alec Pronovost	
2024	La Dernière communion	Eli Jean Tahchi	

=== Prix Unis TV ===
Year	Film	Director	Ref
2022	Blond Night (Nuit blonde)	Gabrielle Demers	
2023	Heat Spell (L'Été des chaleurs)	Marie-Pier Dupuis	
2024	The Second-to-Last Time I Pooped My Pants (L'avant-dernière fois que j'ai fait caca dans mes culottes)	Sébastien Landry	

=== Prix Jeunesse Fonderie Horne ===
Year	Film	Director	Ref
2021	Migrants	Hugo Caby, Zoé Devise, Antoine Dupriez, Aubin Kubiak and Lucas Lermytte	
2022	Kayak	Solène Bosseboeuf	
2023	Le temps des orages	Gabrielle Gingras	
2024			
2025	Boîte à savon	Jimmy G. Pettigrew	
