= Prix Iris for Best Live Action Short Film =

Annual Canadian film award

The Prix Iris for Best Live Action Short Film (French: Prix Iris du meilleur court ou moyen métrage de fiction) is an annual film award presented by Québec Cinéma as part of its Prix Iris program, to honour the year's best short film made within the cinema of Quebec. Starting at the 16th Jutra Awards, the award was presented to the directors and producers of the short films. Prior to that ceremony, only the directors received nominations.

Until 2016, it was known as the Jutra Award for Best Live Action Short Film in memory of influential Quebec film director Claude Jutra. Following the withdrawal of Jutra's name from the award, the 2016 award was presented under the name Québec Cinéma. The Prix Iris name was announced in October 2016.

Hany Ouichou received the most nominations, five, and won one award, while François Jaros, Fanny-Laure Malo and Maria Gracia Turgeon won two awards, each time in consecutive years: Jaros and Malo in 2016 and 2017 and Gracia Turgeon in 2019 and 2020.

Two short films nominated during the 21st Quebec Cinema Awards were nominated for the Academy Award for Best Live Action Short Film: Fauve at the 91st Academy Awards and Brotherhood at the 92nd Academy Awards. Invincible, the winner of the award at the 25th Quebec Cinema Awards, was also nominated during the 96th Academy Awards.

== 1990s ==
Year	Film	Filmmakers	Ref
1999; 1st Jutra Awards
1999; 1st Jutra Awards	Magical Words (Les mots magiques)	Jean-Marc Vallée	
1999; 1st Jutra Awards	Meanwhile (Pendant ce temps...)	Ghyslaine Côté	
1999; 1st Jutra Awards	Pas de deux sur chanson triste	Gaëlle d'Ynglemare	
1999; 1st Jutra Awards	Straight from the Suburbs	Carole Ducharme	

== 2000s ==
Year	Film	Filmmakers	Ref
2000; 2nd Jutra Awards
2000; 2nd Jutra Awards	Atomic Saké	Louise Archambault	
2000; 2nd Jutra Awards	2000 pieds carrés	Stéphane Morissette	
2000; 2nd Jutra Awards	The Little Story of a Man Without a Story (La petite histoire d'un homme sans histoire)	Jean-François Asselin	
2000; 2nd Jutra Awards	Mommie, There's a Monster in My Bed (Maman, y'a un monstre dans mon lit)	Guy Bonneau, Martine Fortin	
2001; 3rd Jutra Awards
2001; 3rd Jutra Awards	Inséparables	Normand Bergeron	
2001; 3rd Jutra Awards	Lila	Robin Aubert	
2001; 3rd Jutra Awards	Romain et Juliette	Frédéric Lapierre	
2001; 3rd Jutra Awards	Take-out	Jean-François Monette	
2002; 4th Jutra Awards
2002; 4th Jutra Awards	Remembrance	Stephanie Morgenstern	
2002; 4th Jutra Awards	Ismael	Rudy Barichello	
2002; 4th Jutra Awards	Sunk	Yves Christian Fournier	
2002; 4th Jutra Awards	Under a Leaden Sky	Guy Lampron	
2003; 5th Jutra Awards
2003; 5th Jutra Awards	Hit and Run	Richard Jutras	
2003; 5th Jutra Awards	Aspiration	Constant Mentzas	
2003; 5th Jutra Awards	The City Without Windows	Julien Fonfrede, Karim Hussain	
2003; 5th Jutra Awards	Song	Karl R. Hearne	
2004; 6th Jutra Awards
2004; 6th Jutra Awards	Mammouth	Stefan Miljevic	
2004; 6th Jutra Awards	Bager	Tomi Grgicevic	
2004; 6th Jutra Awards	Corps étrangers	Simon Lavoie	
2004; 6th Jutra Awards	Léo	Nicolas Roy	
2005; 7th Jutra Awards
2005; 7th Jutra Awards	Papa	Émile Proulx-Cloutier	
2005; 7th Jutra Awards	The Bridge (Le pont)	Guy Édoin	
2005; 7th Jutra Awards	J'te laisserai pas tomber	Patrick Goyette	
2005; 7th Jutra Awards	Quelques éclats d'aube	Simon Lavoie	
2006; 8th Jutra Awards
2006; 8th Jutra Awards	The White Chapel (Une chapelle blanche)	Simon Lavoie	
2006; 8th Jutra Awards	Nobody (L'air de rien)	Frédérick Pelletier	
2006; 8th Jutra Awards	Radio	Patrick Boivin	
2006; 8th Jutra Awards	Red (Le rouge au sol)	Maxime Giroux	
2007; 9th Jutra Awards
2007; 9th Jutra Awards	The Dead Water (Les eaux mortes)	Guy Édoin	
2007; 9th Jutra Awards	À L'ombre	Simon Lavoie	
2007; 9th Jutra Awards	The Days (Les jours)	Maxime Giroux	
2007; 9th Jutra Awards	Sunday (Petit dimanche)	Nicolas Roy	
2008; 10th Jutra Awards
2008; 10th Jutra Awards	Our Jail Is a Kingdom (Notre prison est un royaume)	Simon Galiero	
2008; 10th Jutra Awards	Can You Wave Bye-Bye?	Sarah Galea-Davis	
2008; 10th Jutra Awards	The Colony	Jeff Barnaby	
2008; 10th Jutra Awards	Dust Bowl Ha! Ha!	Sébastien Pilote	
2009; 11th Jutra Awards
2009; 11th Jutra Awards	Next Floor	Denis Villeneuve	
2009; 11th Jutra Awards	Beyond the Walls (La battue)	Guy Édoin	
2009; 11th Jutra Awards	My Name Is Victor Gazon (Mon nom est Victor Gazon)	Patrick Gazé	
2009; 11th Jutra Awards	Les Réfugies	Émile Proulx-Cloutier	

== 2010s ==
Year	Film	Filmmakers	Ref
2010; 12th Jutra Awards
2010; 12th Jutra Awards	Danse Macabre	Pedro Pires	
2010; 12th Jutra Awards	La chute	Ivan Grbovic	
2010; 12th Jutra Awards	Mon cher Robert	Claude Brie	
2010; 12th Jutra Awards	L'ordre des choses	Anne Émond	
2010; 12th Jutra Awards	Snow Hides the Shade of Fig Trees (La neige cache l'ombre des figuiers)	Samer Najari	
2011; 13th Jutra Awards
2011; 13th Jutra Awards	Opening Up (M'ouvrir)	Albéric Aurtenèche	
2011; 13th Jutra Awards	Félix et Malou	Sophie Dupuis	
2011; 13th Jutra Awards	Mokhtar	Halima Ouardiri	
2011; 13th Jutra Awards	Sophie Lavoie	Anne Émond	
2011; 13th Jutra Awards	Vapor	Kaveh Nabatian	
2012; 14th Jutra Awards
2012; 14th Jutra Awards	Trotteur	Arnaud Brisebois, Francis Leclerc	
2012; 14th Jutra Awards	Hope	Pedro Pires	
2012; 14th Jutra Awards	It Is Nothing (Ce n'est rien)	Nicolas Roy	
2012; 14th Jutra Awards	Tabula Rasa	Matthew Rankin	
2012; 14th Jutra Awards	Vacarme	Daniel Karolewicz	
2013; 15th Jutra Awards
2013; 15th Jutra Awards	Where I Am (Là où je suis)	Myriam Magassouba	
2013; 15th Jutra Awards	Acrobat	Eduardo Menz	
2013; 15th Jutra Awards	Herd Leader (Chef de meute)	Chloé Robichaud	
2013; 15th Jutra Awards	The Near Future (Le futur proche)	Sophie Goyette	
2013; 15th Jutra Awards	With Jeff (Avec Jeff, à moto)	Marie-Ève Juste	
2014; 16th Jutra Awards
2014; 16th Jutra Awards	An Extraordinary Person (Quelqu'un d'extraordinaire)	Monia Chokri, Nancy Grant	
2014; 16th Jutra Awards	Gaspé Copper	Alexis Fortier Gauthier, Hany Ouichou	
2014; 16th Jutra Awards	Hurricane Boy Fuck You Tabarnak! (L'ouragan Fuck You Tabarnak!)	Ara Ball, Tania Duguay	
2014; 16th Jutra Awards	Remember Me (Mémorable moi)	Jean-François Asselin	
2014; 16th Jutra Awards	Time Flies (Nous avions)	Stéphane Moukarzel, Gabrielle Tougas Fréquette, Ménaïc Raoul	
2015; 17th Jutra Awards
2015; 17th Jutra Awards	Life's a Bitch (Toutes des connes)	François Jaros, Fanny-Laure Malo	
2015; 17th Jutra Awards	Anatomie	Patrick Bossé, Catherine Chagnon, Nathalie Cloutier	
2015; 17th Jutra Awards	Chaloupe	Sophie B. Jacques, Joëlle Agathe Tardif	
2015; 17th Jutra Awards	Follow the Fox (Suivre la piste du renard)	Simon Laganière, Mathieu Denis	
2015; 17th Jutra Awards	Mynarski Death Plummet (Mynarski chute mortelle)	Matthew Rankin, Gabrielle Tougas-Fréchette	
2016; 18th Quebec Cinema Awards
2016; 18th Quebec Cinema Awards	Maurice	François Jaros, Fanny-Laure Malo	
2016; 18th Quebec Cinema Awards	Blue Thunder (Bleu tonnerre)	Jean-Marc E. Roy, Philippe David Gagné, Ménaïc Raoul, Gabrielle Tougas-Fréchette	
2016; 18th Quebec Cinema Awards	Le cycle des moteurs	Patrice Laliberté, Julie Groleau	
2016; 18th Quebec Cinema Awards	The Pedophile (Le pédophile)	Ara Ball, Estelle Champoux, Jean-Philippe Bernier	
2016; 18th Quebec Cinema Awards	Star	Émilie Mannering, Fanny Drew, Sarah Mannering	
2017; 19th Quebec Cinema Awards
2017; 19th Quebec Cinema Awards	Mutants	Alexandre Dostie, Hany Ouichou, Gabrielle Tougas-Fréchette	
2017; 19th Quebec Cinema Awards	Oh What a Wonderful Feeling	François Jaros, Fanny-Laure Malo	
2017; 19th Quebec Cinema Awards	Plain and Simple (Tout simplement)	Raphaël Ouellet, Annick Blanc	
2017; 19th Quebec Cinema Awards	The Voice (La voce)	David Uloth, Galilé Marion-Gauvin, Dominique Noujeim	
2017; 19th Quebec Cinema Awards	Wild Skin (La peau sauvage)	Ariane Louis-Seize, Hany Ouichou, Jeanne-Marie Poulain	
2018; 20th Quebec Cinema Awards
2018; 20th Quebec Cinema Awards	Pre-Drink	Marc-Antoine Lemire, Maria Gracia Turgeon	
2018; 20th Quebec Cinema Awards	Born in the Maelstrom (Née dans la tourmente)	Meryam Joobeur, Hany Ouichou, Sylvain Corbeil	
2018; 20th Quebec Cinema Awards	The Catch	Holly Brace-Lavoie, Fanny Drew, Sarah Mannering	
2018; 20th Quebec Cinema Awards	Crème de menthe	Jean-Marc E. Roy, Philippe David Gagné	
2018; 20th Quebec Cinema Awards	Lost Paradise Lost	Yan Giroux, Annick Blanc	
2019; 21st Quebec Cinema Awards
2019; 21st Quebec Cinema Awards	Brotherhood	Meryam Joobeur, Habib Attia, Sarra Ben-Hassen, Andreas Rocksén, Maria Gracia Turgeon	
2019; 21st Quebec Cinema Awards	Fauve	Jérémy Comte, Maria Gracia Turgeon, Evren Boisjoli	
2019; 21st Quebec Cinema Awards	Lunar-Orbit Rendezvous	Mélanie Charbonneau, Virginie Nolin	
2019; 21st Quebec Cinema Awards	Milk	Santiago Menghini, Max Walker	
2019; 21st Quebec Cinema Awards	My Boy (Mon Boy)	Sarah Pellerin, Fanny-Laure Malo, Annie-Claude Quirion	

== 2020s ==
Year	Film	Filmmakers	Ref
2020; 22nd Quebec Cinema Awards
2020; 22nd Quebec Cinema Awards	Just Me and You (Juste moi et toi)	Sandrine Brodeur-Desrosiers, Johannie Deschambault	
2020; 22nd Quebec Cinema Awards	BKS (SDR)	Alexa-Jeanne Dubé, Émilie Mercier	
2020; 22nd Quebec Cinema Awards	Heart Bomb (Une bombe au cœur)	Rémi St-Michel, Christian Larouche, Sébastien Létourneau	
2020; 22nd Quebec Cinema Awards	I'll End Up in Jail (Je finirai en prison)	Alexandre Dostie, Hany Ouichou	
2020; 22nd Quebec Cinema Awards	Jojo	Guillaume Laurin, Fanny Forest, Julie Groleau	
2021; 23rd Quebec Cinema Awards
2021; 23rd Quebec Cinema Awards	Foam (Écume)	Omar Elhamy, Jonathan Beaulieu-Cyr, Paul Chotel	
2021; 23rd Quebec Cinema Awards	Aniksha	Vincent Toi, Guillaume Collin	
2021; 23rd Quebec Cinema Awards	Goodbye Golovin	Simon Corriveau-Gagné, Mathieu Grimard	
2021; 23rd Quebec Cinema Awards	Moon (Lune)	Zoé Pelchat, Mélanie S. Dubois	
2021; 23rd Quebec Cinema Awards	Shooting Star (Comme une comète)	Ariane Louis-Seize, Fanny Drew, Sarah Mannering	
2022; 24th Quebec Cinema Awards
2022; 24th Quebec Cinema Awards	Like the Ones I Used to Know (Les grandes claques)	Annie St-Pierre, Sarah Mannering, Fanny Drew	
2022; 24th Quebec Cinema Awards	Fanmi	Sandrine Brodeur-Desrosiers, François Bonneau, Carmine Pierre-Dufour	
2022; 24th Quebec Cinema Awards	In the Jam Jar	Étienne Hansez, Colin Nixon	
2022; 24th Quebec Cinema Awards	Joutel	Alexa-Jeanne Dubé, Geneviève Gosselin-G.	
2022; 24th Quebec Cinema Awards	Ousmane	Jorge Camarotti	
2023; 25th Quebec Cinema Awards
2023; 25th Quebec Cinema Awards	Invincible	Vincent René-Lortie, Élise Lardinois, Samuel Caron	
2023; 25th Quebec Cinema Awards	Blond Night (Nuit blonde)	Gabrielle Demers, Nellie Carrier	
2023; 25th Quebec Cinema Awards	Nanitic	Carol Nguyen, Marie Lytwynuk	
2023; 25th Quebec Cinema Awards	No Ghost in the Morgue	Marilyn Cooke, Kélyna N. Lauzier, Macha Houssart	
2023; 25th Quebec Cinema Awards	Simo	Aziz Zoromba, Rosalie Chicoine Perreault	
2024; 26th Quebec Cinema Awards
2024; 26th Quebec Cinema Awards	Summer of 2000 (Été 2000)	Virginie Nolin, Laurence Olivier, Estelle Champoux, Mylène Corbeil	
2024; 26th Quebec Cinema Awards	Gaby's Hills (Gaby les collines)	Zoé Pelchat, Véronique Charbonneau	
2024; 26th Quebec Cinema Awards	I Used to Live There	Ryan McKenna	
2024; 26th Quebec Cinema Awards	Making Babies (Faire un enfant)	Eric K. Boulianne, Jean-Sébastien Beaudoin Gagnon, Johannie Deschambault	
2024; 26th Quebec Cinema Awards	Mothers and Monsters	Édith Jorisch, Patrick Francke-Sirois, Isabelle Grignon-Francke	
2025; 27th Quebec Cinema Awards
2025; 27th Quebec Cinema Awards	Mercenaire	Pier-Philippe Chevigny, Geneviève Gosselin-G.	
2025; 27th Quebec Cinema Awards	Fantas	Halima Elkhatabi	
2025; 27th Quebec Cinema Awards	Gender Reveal	Mo Matton, Léonie Hurtubise	
2025; 27th Quebec Cinema Awards	Platanero	Juan Frank Hernandez, Vincent Labelle, Laurence Ly, Béatrice Moukhaiber	
2025; 27th Quebec Cinema Awards	Rituals Under a Scarlet Sky (Rituels sous un ciel écarlate)	Dominique Chila, Samer Najari, Galilé Marion-Gauvin	

== Multiple wins and nominations ==
=== Multiple wins ===
Wins	Filmmaker
2	François Jaros
2	Fanny-Laure Malo
2	Maria Gracia Turgeon

=== Three or more nominations ===
Nominations	Filmmaker
5	Hany Ouichou
4	Fanny Drew
4	Simon Lavoie
4	Fanny-Laure Malo
4	Sarah Mannering
4	Gabrielle Tougas-Fréchette
3	Guy Édoin
3	François Jaros
3	Nicolas Roy
3	Maria Gracia Turgeon

== See also ==
- Canadian Screen Award for Best Live Action Short Drama
