= Sarah Mannering =

Canadian film producer

Sarah Mannering is a Canadian film producer, who was a cofounder of Colonelle Films with Fanny Drew and Geneviève Dulude-De Celles. She is most noted as producer of the 2018 film A Colony (Une colonie), which was the winner of the Canadian Screen Award for Best Motion Picture at the 7th Canadian Screen Awards in 2019.

== Filmography ==
- The Cut (La Coupe) - 2014
- Jachère - 2014
- Milky (Lactée) - 2014
- Fucké - 2014
- Welcome to F.L. (Bienvenue à F.L.) - 2015
- The Guy from Work (Le gars d'la shop) - 2015
- Star - 2015
- A Love Story - 2015
- Beyond Blue Waves (Flots gris) - 2016
- Drabes - 2016
- Gulîstan, Land of Roses (Gulîstan, terre de roses) - 2016
- Cast Off (Larguer les amarres) - 2016
- The Catch - 2017
- The Other Rio (L'Autre Rio) - 2017
- Snowbirds - 2017
- Minoritaires - 2017
- A Colony (Une colonie) - 2018
- Mahalia Melts in the Rain - 2018
- The Prince of Val-Bé (Le Prince de Val-Bé) - 2019
- Astres - 2019
- King Lajoie - 2019
- Like a House on Fire - 2020
- Shooting Star (Comme une comète) - 2020
- Like the Ones I Used to Know (Les grandes claques) - 2021
- Happy Life (La vie heureuse) - 2021
- Mimine - 2021
- Rodeo (Rodéo) - 2022
- Days (Les Jours) - 2023
- Hello Stranger - 2024
- Extras - 2024
- Vile & Miserable (Vil & Misérable) - 2024
- Nina Roza - 2026

== Awards ==
| Award | Year | Work | Result | Ref(s) |
|---|---|---|---|---|
| Canadian Screen Award for Best Motion Picture | 2019 | A Colony (Une colonie) (with Fanny Drew) | Won | |
| Canadian Screen Award for Best Live Action Short Drama | 2015 | The Cut (La Coupe) (with Fanny Drew, Geneviève Dulude-De Celles) | Nominated | |
| Canadian Screen Award for Best Live Action Short Drama | 2017 | Star (with Fanny Drew, Émilie Mannering) | Nominated | |
| Canadian Screen Award for Best Live Action Short Drama | 2019 | Mahalia Melts in the Rain (with Émilie Mannering, Carmine Pierre-Dufour) | Nominated | |
| Canadian Screen Award for Best Live Action Short Drama | 2022 | Like the Ones I Used to Know (Les Grandes claques) (with Fanny Drew, Annie St-Pierre) | Nominated | |
| Canadian Screen Award for Best Live Action Short Drama | 2023 | Mimine (with Fanny Drew, Simon Laganière) | Nominated | |
| Canadian Screen Award for Best Feature Length Documentary | 2017 | Gulîstan, Land of Roses (Gulîstan, terre de roses) (with Fanny Drew, Zaynê Akyol, Yanick Létourneau, Mehmet Aktas, Denis McCready) | Nominated | |
| Prix Iris for Best Film | 2019 | A Colony (Une colonie) (with Fanny Drew) | Nominated | |
| Prix Iris for Best Live Action Short Film | 2018 | The Catch (with Fanny Drew, Holly Brace-Lavoie) | Nominated | |
| Prix Iris for Best Live Action Short Film | 2021 | Shooting Star (Comme une comète) (with Fanny Drew, Ariane Louis-Seize) | Nominated | |
| Prix Iris for Best Live Action Short Film | 2022 | Like the Ones I Used to Know (Les grandes claques) (with Fanny Drew, Annie St-Pierre) | Won | |
