= Fanny Drew =

Canadian film producer

Fanny Drew is a Canadian film producer, who was a cofounder of Colonelle Films with Sarah Mannering and Geneviève Dulude-De Celles. She is most noted as producer of the 2018 film A Colony (Une colonie), which was the winner of the Canadian Screen Award for Best Motion Picture at the 7th Canadian Screen Awards in 2019.

== Filmography ==
- Un royaume déménage - 2013
- The Cut (La Coupe) - 2014
- Jachère - 2014
- Milky (Lactée) - 2014
- Fucké - 2014
- Welcome to F.L. (Bienvenue à F.L.) - 2015
- The Guy from Work (Le gars d'la shop) - 2015
- Star - 2015
- A Love Story - 2015
- Beyond Blue Waves (Flots gris) - 2016
- Drabes - 2016
- Gulîstan, Land of Roses (Gulîstan, terre de roses) - 2016
- Cast Off (Larguer les amarres) - 2016
- The Catch - 2017
- The Other Rio (L'Autre Rio) - 2017
- Snowbirds - 2017
- Minoritaires - 2017
- A Colony (Une colonie) - 2018
- Mahalia Melts in the Rain - 2018
- The Prince of Val-Bé (Le Prince de Val-Bé) - 2019
- Astres - 2019
- King Lajoie - 2019
- Like a House on Fire - 2020
- Shooting Star (Comme une comète) - 2020
- Like the Ones I Used to Know (Les grandes claques) - 2021
- Happy Life (La vie heureuse) - 2021
- Mimine - 2021
- Rodeo (Rodéo) - 2022
- Days (Les Jours) - 2023
- Hello Stranger - 2024
- Extras - 2024
- Vile & Miserable (Vil & Misérable) - 2024
- Nina Roza - 2026

== Awards ==
Award	Year	Work	Result	Ref(s)
Canadian Screen Award for Best Motion Picture	2019	A Colony (Une colonie) (with Sarah Mannering)	Won	
Canadian Screen Award for Best Live Action Short Drama	2015	The Cut (La Coupe) (with Sarah Mannering, Geneviève Dulude-De Celles)	Nominated	
Canadian Screen Award for Best Live Action Short Drama	2017	Star (with Sarah Mannering, Émilie Mannering)	Nominated	
Canadian Screen Award for Best Live Action Short Drama	2019	Mahalia Melts in the Rain (with Sarah Mannering, Émilie Mannering, Carmine Pierre-Dufour)	Nominated	
Canadian Screen Award for Best Live Action Short Drama	2022	Like the Ones I Used to Know (Les Grandes claques) (with Sarah Mannering, Annie St-Pierre)	Nominated	
Canadian Screen Award for Best Live Action Short Drama	2023	Mimine (with Sarah Mannering, Simon Laganière)	Nominated	
Canadian Screen Award for Best Feature Length Documentary	2017	Gulîstan, Land of Roses (Gulîstan, terre de roses) (with Sarah Mannering, Zaynê Akyol, Yanick Létourneau, Mehmet Aktas, Denis McCready)	Nominated	
Prix Iris for Best Film	2019	A Colony (Une colonie) (with Sarah Mannering)	Nominated	
Prix Iris for Best Live Action Short Film	2018	The Catch (with Sarah Mannering, Holly Brace-Lavoie)	Nominated	
Prix Iris for Best Live Action Short Film	2021	Shooting Star (Comme une comète) (with Sarah Mannering, Ariane Louis-Seize)	Nominated	
Prix Iris for Best Live Action Short Film	2022	Like the Ones I Used to Know (Les grandes claques) (with Sarah Mannering, Annie St-Pierre)	Won	
