= Canadian Screen Award for Best Live Action Short Drama =

Award by the Academy of Canadian Cinema and Television

- Country: Canada
- Presented by: Academy of Canadian Cinema & Television
- First award: 1986
- Currently held by: Year of the Dragon (2025)
- Website: academy.ca/awards

The Canadian Screen Award for Best Live Action Short Drama is awarded by the Academy of Canadian Cinema and Television to the best Canadian live action short film. Formerly part of the Genie Awards, since 2012 it has been presented as part of the Canadian Screen Awards.

In the 1980s and 1990s, the award was not always presented at every Genie Award ceremony. In years when the award was not presented, a single award was instead presented for Best Theatrical Short Film, inclusive of both animated and live-action shorts. Under current Academy regulations, the awards for live action and animated shorts can be collapsed into a single award if either category receives two or fewer eligible submissions, but remain separate if both categories surpass two submissions.

== 1980s ==
| Year | Film | Filmmakers | Ref |
|---|---|---|---|
| 1980; 1st Genie Awards | No award presented; see Genie Award for Best Theatrical Short Film. | | |
| 1981; 2nd Genie Awards | No award presented; see Genie Award for Best Theatrical Short Film. | | |
| 1982; 3rd Genie Awards | No award presented; see Genie Award for Best Theatrical Short Film. | | |
| 1983; 4th Genie Awards | No award presented; see Genie Award for Best Theatrical Short Film. | | |
| 1984; 5th Genie Awards | No award presented; see Genie Award for Best Theatrical Short Film. | | |
| 1985; 6th Genie Awards | No award presented; see Genie Award for Best Theatrical Short Film. | | |
| 1986; 7th Genie Awards | The Edit | Paul Caulfield | |
| 1986; 7th Genie Awards | Summer Rain (Pluie d’été) | Louis-Georges Tétreault | |
| 1986; 7th Genie Awards | Working Title | Fred Jones, Ken Scott | |
| 1987; 8th Genie Awards | I Need a Man Like You to Make My Dreams Come True | Daria Stermac, Kalli Paakspuu | |
| 1987; 8th Genie Awards | It's a Party! | Peg Campbell | |
| 1987; 8th Genie Awards | Nion in the Kabaret de La Vita | Jeremy Podeswa | |
| 1987; 8th Genie Awards | Transit | Jean-Roch Marcotte | |
| 1987; 8th Genie Awards | Where's Pete | Michael Scott | |
| 1988; 9th Genie Awards | No award presented; see Genie Award for Best Theatrical Short Film. | | |
| 1989; 10th Genie Awards | The Mysterious Moon Men of Canada | Bruce McDonald, Colin Brunton | |
| 1989; 10th Genie Awards | Inside/Out | Lori Spring | |
| 1989; 10th Genie Awards | The Job | Donald Scott | |
| 1989; 10th Genie Awards | The Milkman Cometh | Lorne Bailey | |
| 1989; 10th Genie Awards | Tenderfoot (Le Pied tendre) | Viateur Castonguay, Roger Boire | |

== 1990s ==
| Year | Film | Filmmakers | Ref |
|---|---|---|---|
| 1990; 11th Genie Awards | In Search of the Last Good Man | Peggy Thompson, Peg Campbell | |
| 1990; 11th Genie Awards | The Journey Home | Mary Armstrong | |
| 1990; 11th Genie Awards | Monster in the Coal Bin | Ellen Rutter, Tracy Traeger, Allen Schinkel | |
| 1990; 11th Genie Awards | Multiple Choice | Debbie McGee | |
| 1990; 11th Genie Awards | Odyssey in August | Leonard Farlinger, Stephen Roscoe | |
| 1991; 12th Genie Awards | No award presented; see Genie Award for Best Theatrical Short Film. | | |
| 1992; 13th Genie Awards | Battle of the Bulge | Arlene Hazzan Green | |
| 1992; 13th Genie Awards | Kumar and Mr. Jones | Paul Brown, Leonard Farlinger | |
| 1992; 13th Genie Awards | Stroke | Gregory Middleton, Mark Sawers | |
| 1993; 14th Genie Awards | The Fairy Who Didn't Want to Be a Fairy Anymore | Laurie Lynd | |
| 1993; 14th Genie Awards | The Date | Linda Theodosakis, Nikos Theodosakis | |
| 1993; 14th Genie Awards | Hate Mail | Chris Kelly, Mark Sawers | |
| 1993; 14th Genie Awards | Stereotypes (Stéréotypes) | Marcel Giroux, Jean-Marc Vallée | |
| 1993; 14th Genie Awards | Your Country, My Country (Dans ton pays...) | Marquise Lepage | |
| 1994; 15th Genie Awards | No award presented; see Genie Award for Best Theatrical Short Film. | | |
| 1995; 16th Genie Awards | No award presented; see Genie Award for Best Theatrical Short Film. | | |
| 1996; 17th Genie Awards | No award presented; see Genie Award for Best Theatrical Short Film. | | |
| 1997; 18th Genie Awards | The Hangman's Bride | Naomi McCormack | |
| 1997; 18th Genie Awards | Elevated | Steve Hoban, Vincenzo Natali, Vanessa Laufer | |
| 1997; 18th Genie Awards | SSHHH | Sarah James Overton, Scott Smith, Helen du Toit | |
| 1997; 18th Genie Awards | Zie 37 Stagen | Marcel Giroux, Sylvain Guy | |
| 1998; 19th Genie Awards | When Ponds Freeze Over | Mary Lewis | |
| 1998; 19th Genie Awards | The Chocolate Bomb (La Bombe au chocolat) | Sylvie Rosenthal | |
| 1998; 19th Genie Awards | Claire | Julie Trimingham, Ric Kokotovich | |
| 1998; 19th Genie Awards | Elimination Dance | Michael Ondaatje, Sandy Kaplansky, Bruce McDonald, Don McKellar | |
| 1998; 19th Genie Awards | Shoes Off! | Mark Sawers, Leah Mallen | |
| 1999; 20th Genie Awards | Moving Day | Tina Goldlist, Chris Deacon | |
| 1999; 20th Genie Awards | Chronique d'un cheval fou | Michel Juliani, Raymond Gravelle | |
| 1999; 20th Genie Awards | Kuproquo | Jean-François Rivard, Marie-Josée Larocque | |
| 1999; 20th Genie Awards | Meanwhile (Pendant ce temps...) | Ghyslaine Côté, Robert Lacerte | |
| 1999; 20th Genie Awards | Revisited | Scott Weber | |

== 2000s ==
| Year | Film | Filmmakers | Ref |
|---|---|---|---|
| 2000; 21st Genie Awards | The Little Varius (Le P'tit Varius) | Alain Jacques, André Théberge | |
| 2000; 21st Genie Awards | Below the Belt | Dominique Cardona, Laurie Colbert, Kate Gillen | |
| 2000; 21st Genie Awards | Clean Rite Cowboy | Michael Downing, Joel Awerbuck | |
| 2000; 21st Genie Awards | Foxy Lady, Wild Cherry | Marlene Rodgers, Ines Buchli | |
| 2000; 21st Genie Awards | Soul Cages | Phillip Barker, Simone Urdl | |
| 2001; 22nd Genie Awards | The Heart of the World | Guy Maddin, Jody Shapiro | |
| 2001; 22nd Genie Awards | Camera | David Cronenberg, Jody Shapiro | |
| 2001; 22nd Genie Awards | Side Orders (Foie de canard et cœur de femme) | Marie-Josée Larocque, Stéphane Lapointe, Christiane Ciupka | |
| 2001; 22nd Genie Awards | Three Stories from the End of Everything | John Buchan, Semi Chellas | |
| 2002; 23rd Genie Awards | I Shout Love | Meredith Caplan, Sarah Polley, Jennifer Weiss | |
| 2002; 23rd Genie Awards | Blue Skies | Dawn Rubin, Ann Marie Fleming | |
| 2002; 23rd Genie Awards | Clearing Skies (Une éclaircie sur le fleuve) | Barbara Shrier, Rosa Zacharie | |
| 2002; 23rd Genie Awards | Hit and Run | Éric Couture, Éric Beauséjour, Richard Jutras, Ginette Petit, Christian Larouche | |
| 2002; 23rd Genie Awards | In Store (En magasin) | Raymond Gravelle, Mario Bonenfant | |
| 2002; 23rd Genie Awards | Remembrance | Stephanie Morgenstern, Paula Fleck | |
| 2003; 24th Genie Awards | Noël Blank | Jean-François Rivard, Christiane Ciupka | |
| 2003; 24th Genie Awards | Evelyn: The Cutest Evil Dead Girl | Brad Peyton, Jim Mauro | |
| 2003; 24th Genie Awards | Lonesome Joe | Leah Mallen, Mark Sawers | |
| 2003; 24th Genie Awards | Short Hymn, Silent War | Kate Kung, Sandy Reimer, Charles Officer | |
| 2003; 24th Genie Awards | Why Don't You Dance? | Meredith Caplan, Michael Downing, Joel Awerbuck | |
| 2004; 25th Genie Awards | Capacité 11 personnes | Gaëlle d'Ynglemare, Yves Fortin | |
| 2004; 25th Genie Awards | Choke. | David Hyde, Tyler Levine, Carolyn Newman | |
| 2004; 25th Genie Awards | Desastre | Jay Field, Jane Michener, Ryan O'Donnell | |
| 2004; 25th Genie Awards | The Dog Walker | Andrew Rosen, Geoffrey Turnbull, James Genn | |
| 2004; 25th Genie Awards | TV Dinner...Burp! | Antonello Cozzolino, Annie Normandin, Vanessa-Tatjana Beerli | |
| 2005; 26th Genie Awards | Milo 55160 | Matthew Cervi, David Ostry | |
| 2005; 26th Genie Awards | The Big Thing | Carl Laudan | |
| 2005; 26th Genie Awards | Noise | Greg Spottiswood, Jason Charters, Liam Romalis | |
| 2005; 26th Genie Awards | The Remaining Days (Les Derniers jours) | Simon Olivier Fecteau, Jean-François Lord, Guillaume Lespérance | |
| 2005; 26th Genie Awards | Tuesday Morning...Somewhere (Mardi matin...quelque part) | Hélène Bélanger Martin, Antonello Cozzolino | |
| 2006; 27th Genie Awards | Red (Le rouge au sol) | Maxime Giroux, Paul Barbeau | |
| 2006; 27th Genie Awards | Big Girl | Renuka Jeyapalan, Anneli Ekborn, Michael Gelfand | |
| 2006; 27th Genie Awards | Hiro | Matthew Swanson, Oliver-Barret Lindsay | |
| 2006; 27th Genie Awards | Jack and Jacques (Jack et Jacques) | Marie-Hélène Copti | |
| 2006; 27th Genie Awards | Snapshots for Henry | Teresa Hannigan, Charlotte Disher | |
| 2007; 28th Genie Awards | After All (Après tout) | Alexis Fortier Gauthier, Élaine Hébert | |
| 2007; 28th Genie Awards | Regarding Sarah | Michelle Porter, Amy Belling | |
| 2007; 28th Genie Awards | Screening | Anthony Green, Philip Svoboda | |
| 2007; 28th Genie Awards | The Tragic Story of Nling | Jeffrey St. Jules, Larissa Giroux | |
| 2007; 28th Genie Awards | The Wake of Calum MacLeod (Faire Chaluim Mhic Leòid) | Marc Almon, Nona MacDermid | |
| 2008; 29th Genie Awards | Next Floor | Denis Villeneuve and Phoebe Greenberg | |
| 2008; 29th Genie Awards | The Answer Key | Samir Rehem, Robin Crumley | |
| 2008; 29th Genie Awards | Beyond the Walls (La Battue) | Guy Édoin, Pascal Bascaron, Sylvain Corbeil | |
| 2008; 29th Genie Awards | Can You Wave Bye-Bye? | Sarah Galea-Davis, Paul Barbeau | |
| 2008; 29th Genie Awards | My Name Is Victor Gazon (Mon nom est Victor Gazon) | Patrick Gazé, Antonello Cozzolino, Marie-Josée Laroque, Annie Normandin | |
| 2009; 30th Genie Awards | Danse Macabre | Pedro Pires, Catherine Chagnon | |
| 2009; 30th Genie Awards | Gilles | Constant Mentzas | |
| 2009; 30th Genie Awards | Land of Men (Terre des hommes) | Ky Nam Le Duc | |
| 2009; 30th Genie Awards | Life Begins (La Vie commence) | Élaine Hébert, Émile Proulx-Cloutier | |
| 2009; 30th Genie Awards | Princess Margaret Blvd. | Dan Montgomery, Kazik Radwanski | |

== 2010s ==
| Year | Film | Filmmakers | Ref |
|---|---|---|---|
| 2010; 31st Genie Awards | Savage | Lisa Jackson, Lauren Grant, Lori Lozinski | |
| 2010; 31st Genie Awards | File Under Miscellaneous | Jeff Barnaby, John Christou | |
| 2010; 31st Genie Awards | Marius Borodine | Emanuel Hoss-Desmarais, Vincent Hoss-Desmarais | |
| 2010; 31st Genie Awards | Out in That Deep Blue Sea | Kazik Radwanski, Dan Montgomery | |
| 2010; 31st Genie Awards | Vapor | Kaveh Nabatian, Cédric Bourdeau, Stéphane Tanguay | |
| 2011; 32nd Genie Awards | Doubles with Slight Pepper | Ian Harnarine | |
| 2011; 32nd Genie Awards | Ora | René Chénier, Philippe Baylaucq | |
| 2011; 32nd Genie Awards | La Ronde | Élaine Hébert, Sophie Goyette | |
| 2011; 32nd Genie Awards | Hope | Pedro Pires, Phoebe Greenberg, Penny Mancuso | |
| 2012; 1st Canadian Screen Awards | Throat Song | Miranda de Pencier, Stacey Aglok Macdonald | |
| 2012; 1st Canadian Screen Awards | First Snow (Première neige) | Michaël Lalancette | |
| 2012; 1st Canadian Screen Awards | Frost | Lauren Grant, Jeremy Ball, Robert Munroe | |
| 2012; 1st Canadian Screen Awards | Herd Leader (Chef de meute) | Fanny-Laure Malo, Sarah Pellerin, Chloé Robichaud | |
| 2012; 1st Canadian Screen Awards | The Near Future (Le futur proche) | Sophie Goyette | |
| 2013; 2nd Canadian Screen Awards | Noah | Patrick Cederberg, Walter Woodman | |
| 2013; 2nd Canadian Screen Awards | A Grand Canal | Johnny Ma | |
| 2013; 2nd Canadian Screen Awards | Ina Litovski | Anaïs Barbeau-Lavalette, André Turpin | |
| 2013; 2nd Canadian Screen Awards | Remember Me (Mémorable moi) | Jean-François Asselin | |
| 2013; 2nd Canadian Screen Awards | Time Flies (Nous avions) | Stéphane Moukarzel | |
| 2014; 3rd Canadian Screen Awards | Hole | Martin Edralin, Laura Perlmutter, Andrew Nicholas McCann Smith | |
| 2014; 3rd Canadian Screen Awards | The Cut (La Coupe) | Geneviève Dulude-De Celles, Fanny Drew, Sarah Mannering | |
| 2014; 3rd Canadian Screen Awards | Follow the Fox (Suivre la piste du renard) | Simon Laganière | |
| 2014; 3rd Canadian Screen Awards | Little Brother (Petit frère) | Rémi St-Michel, Jean-Sébastien Beaudoin Gagnon, Eric K. Boulianne | |
| 2014; 3rd Canadian Screen Awards | Sleeping Giant | Andrew Cividino, Karen Harnisch, Marc Swenker, Aaron Yeger | |
| 2015; 4th Canadian Screen Awards | She Stoops to Conquer | Zack Russell, Marianna Khoury | |
| 2015; 4th Canadian Screen Awards | Blue Thunder (Bleu tonnerre) | Philippe David Gagné, Jean-Marc E. Roy | |
| 2015; 4th Canadian Screen Awards | Mynarski Death Plummet (Mynarski chute mortelle) | Matthew Rankin, Gabrielle Tougas-Fréchette | |
| 2015; 4th Canadian Screen Awards | Overpass (Viaduc) | Patrice Laliberté | |
| 2015; 4th Canadian Screen Awards | Roberta | Catherine Chagnon, Caroline Monnet | |
| 2016; 5th Canadian Screen Awards | Mutants | Alexandre Dostie, Hany Ouichou, Gabrielle Tougas-Fréchette | |
| 2016; 5th Canadian Screen Awards | A Funeral for Lightning | Emily Kai Bock | |
| 2016; 5th Canadian Screen Awards | Oh What a Wonderful Feeling | François Jaros, Fanny-Laure Malo | |
| 2016; 5th Canadian Screen Awards | Star | Émilie Mannering, Fanny Drew, Sarah Mannering | |
| 2016; 5th Canadian Screen Awards | Wild Skin (La Peau sauvage) | Ariane Louis-Seize, Jeanne-Marie Poulain, Hany Ouichou | |
| 2017; 6th Canadian Screen Awards | Fluffy | Lee Filipovski | |
| 2017; 6th Canadian Screen Awards | The Beep Test (La Course navette) | Maxime Aubert, Audrey D. Laroche | |
| 2017; 6th Canadian Screen Awards | Garage at Night (Garage de soir) | Daniel Daigle, Aurélie Breton | |
| 2017; 6th Canadian Screen Awards | Plain and Simple (Tout simplement) | Raphaël Ouellet, Annick Blanc | |
| 2017; 6th Canadian Screen Awards | Pre-Drink | Marc-Antoine Lemire, Maria Gracia Turgeon | |
2018; 7th Canadian Screen Awards
| 2018; 7th Canadian Screen Awards | Fauve | Jérémy Comte, Maria Gracia Turgeon, Evren Boisjoli | |
| 2018; 7th Canadian Screen Awards | The Colour of Your Lips (La couleur de tes lèvres) | Annick Blanc, Maria Gracia Turgeon | |
| 2018; 7th Canadian Screen Awards | The Fish and the Sea | Phillip Thomas | |
| 2018; 7th Canadian Screen Awards | For Nonna Anna | Luis De Filippis | |
| 2018; 7th Canadian Screen Awards | Mahalia Melts in the Rain | Émilie Mannering, Carmine Pierre-Dufour. Sarah Mannering, Fanny Drew | |
2019; 8th Canadian Screen Awards
| 2019; 8th Canadian Screen Awards | Pick | Alicia K. Harris | |
| 2019; 8th Canadian Screen Awards | Black Forest (Forêt Noire) | Jean-Marc E. Roy, Philippe David Gagné, Julie Groleau | |
| 2019; 8th Canadian Screen Awards | Just Me and You (Juste moi et toi) | Sandrine Brodeur-Desrosiers, Johannie Deschambault | |
| 2019; 8th Canadian Screen Awards | Kinship | Jorge Camarotti | |
| 2019; 8th Canadian Screen Awards | My Boy (Mon Boy) | Sarah Pellerin, Fanny-Laure Malo, Annie-Claude Quirion | |

== 2020s ==
| Year | Film | Filmmakers | Ref |
|---|---|---|---|
2020; 9th Canadian Screen Awards
| 2020; 9th Canadian Screen Awards | Black Bodies | Kelly Fyffe-Marshall, Tamar Bird, Sasha Leigh Henry | |
| 2020; 9th Canadian Screen Awards | Bad Omen | Salar Pashtoonyar | |
| 2020; 9th Canadian Screen Awards | Benjamin, Benny, Ben | Paul Shkordoff, Jason Aita | |
| 2020; 9th Canadian Screen Awards | Cayenne | Simon Gionet | |
| 2020; 9th Canadian Screen Awards | Goodbye Golovin | Mathieu Grimard, Simon Corriveau | |
2021; 10th Canadian Screen Awards
| 2021; 10th Canadian Screen Awards | Girls Shouldn't Walk Alone at Night (Les filles ne marchent pas seules la nuit) | Katerine Martineau, Guillaume Collin | |
| 2021; 10th Canadian Screen Awards | Fanmi | Sandrine Brodeur-Desrosiers, François Bonneau, Carmine Pierre-Dufour | |
| 2021; 10th Canadian Screen Awards | In the Jam Jar | Étienne Hansez, Colin Nixon | |
| 2021; 10th Canadian Screen Awards | Like the Ones I Used to Know (Les Grandes claques) | Annie St-Pierre, Sarah Mannering, Fanny Drew | |
| 2021; 10th Canadian Screen Awards | Ousmane | Jorge Camarotti | |
2022; 11th Canadian Screen Awards
| 2022; 11th Canadian Screen Awards | Simo | Rosalie Chicoine Perreault, Aziz Zoromba | |
| 2022; 11th Canadian Screen Awards | III | Salomé Villeneuve, Catherine Boily, Rosalie Chicoine Perreault | |
| 2022; 11th Canadian Screen Awards | À la vie à l'amor | Lex Garcia, Léonie Hurtubise, Émilie Mannering | |
| 2022; 11th Canadian Screen Awards | Mimine | Simon Laganière, Fanny Drew, Sarah Mannering | |
| 2022; 11th Canadian Screen Awards | No Ghost in the Morgue | Marilyn Cooke, Kélyna N. Lauzier | |
2023; 12th Canadian Screen Awards
| 2023; 12th Canadian Screen Awards | Motherland | Jasmin Mozaffari, Priscilla Galvez, Caitlin Grabham | |
| 2023; 12th Canadian Screen Awards | Death to the Bikini! (À mort le bikini!) | Justine Gauthier, Léonie Hurtubise | |
| 2023; 12th Canadian Screen Awards | Heat Spell (L'Été des chaleurs) | Amélie Tremblay, Marie-Pier Dupuis, Dominique Dussault | |
| 2023; 12th Canadian Screen Awards | Invincible | Samuel Caron, Vincent René-Lortie | |
| 2023; 12th Canadian Screen Awards | Mothers and Monsters | Patrick Francke-Sirois, Isabelle Grignon-Francke, Édith Jorisch | |
2024; 13th Canadian Screen Awards
| 2024; 13th Canadian Screen Awards | On a Sunday at Eleven | Alicia K. Harris | |
| 2024; 13th Canadian Screen Awards | Are You Scared to Be Yourself Because You Think That You Might Fail? | Emily Harris, Bec Pecaut | |
| 2024; 13th Canadian Screen Awards | Bibi's Dog Is Dead | Shervin Kermani | |
| 2024; 13th Canadian Screen Awards | Fantas | Halima Elkhatabi | |
| 2024; 13th Canadian Screen Awards | Gender Reveal | Mo Matton, Léonie Hurtubise | |
2025; 14th Canadian Screen Awards
| 2025; 14th Canadian Screen Awards | Year of the Dragon | Giran Findlay Liu | |
| 2025; 14th Canadian Screen Awards | Himalia | Catherine Boily, Rosalie Chicoine Perreault, Clara Milo, Juliette Lossky | |
| 2025; 14th Canadian Screen Awards | Karupy | Kalainithan Kalaichelvan, Shaista Roshan, Alison Almeida | |
| 2025; 14th Canadian Screen Awards | Little Victories (Les petites victoires) | Rafaël Beauchamp, Laurie Pominville | |
| 2025; 14th Canadian Screen Awards | Thin Walls | Robert Armanyous, Dayyaan Jameel | |

== See also ==
- Prix Iris for Best Live Action Short Film
