= Laurie Pominville =

Canadian film producer

Laurie Pominville is a Canadian film producer from Quebec, associated with the Coop Vidéo de Montréal. She is most noted as a producer of the 2025 film Follies (Folichonneries), which was a Canadian Screen Award nominee for Best Picture at the 14th Canadian Screen Awards in 2026.

She was also a producer of the short film Little Victories (Les petites victoires), which was a CSA nominee for Best Live Action Short Drama in the same year.

She began her career as a child actress, with a small supporting acting role in the 2011 film Monsieur Lazhar, prior to studying film at the Université du Québec à Montréal. She was also an associate producer of Romane Garant Chartrand's 2023 short documentary film Afterwards (Après-coups).
