= Star (2015 film) =

- Directed by: Émilie Mannering
- Written by: Emilie Mannering
- Produced by: Fanny Drew; Sarah Mannering; Geneviève Dulude-De Celles
- Starring: Kevin Geronimo Tejeda; Justin Joselin Geronimo Morris
- Cinematography: Hervé Baillargeon
- Edited by: Sylvain Bellemare; Myriam Magassouba
- Production company: Colonelle Films
- Release date: 2015
- Running time: 19 minutes
- Country: Canada
- Language: French

Star is a Canadian short drama film, directed by Émilie Mannering and released in 2015. The film stars Kevin Geronimo Tejeda and Justin Joselin Geronimo Morris as Tito and Jay, two young Black Canadian brothers living in the Montreal neighbourhood of Parc-Extension.

The film was a shortlisted Quebec Cinema Award nominee for Best Short Film at the 18th Quebec Cinema Awards. At the 5th Canadian Screen Awards, the film was shortlisted for Best Live Action Short Drama.

== Cast ==
- Kevin Geronimo Tejeda as Tito
- Justin Joselin Geronimo Morris as Jay
- Jean Josué Junior Petit Frère as Albert
- Sultan Iskandar Chevrier as Chevrier
- Pénélope Langlois-Major
- Nassim Meghriche
