= Pilou =

Pilou may refer to:

- Pilou, a character in the children's animated television series 44 Cats,
- a stage name sometimes used by Canadian musician Pierre-Philippe Côté,
- Pilou, a French stage magician who won an award at the 2006 convention of the Fédération Internationale des Sociétés Magiques.
