= Mynarski Death Plummet =

2014 Canadian film by Matthew Rankin

- Film poster
- French: Mynarski chute mortelle
- Directed by: Matthew Rankin
- Written by: Matthew Rankin
- Produced by: Matthew Rankin; Gabrielle Tougas-Fréchette
- Starring: Alek Rzeszowski; Robert Vilar; Louis Negin
- Cinematography: Julien Fontaine
- Edited by: Matthew Rankin
- Music by: Patrick Keenan
- Distributed by: La Distributrice de films
- Release date: September 5, 2014 (TIFF)
- Running time: 8 minutes
- Country: Canada
- Language: English

Mynarski Death Plummet (French: Mynarski chute mortelle) is a 2014 Canadian short film, written, produced, edited, animated, and directed by Matthew Rankin. Blending live action with animation, the film expressionistically imagines the final moments of Andrew Mynarski, a Canadian World War II airman who was posthumously awarded the Victoria Cross for attempting to free colleague Pat Brophy before plummeting to his death from their burning airplane.

The film was named to the Toronto International Film Festival's annual year-end Canada's Top Ten list for 2014. It was a shortlisted Canadian Screen Award nominee for Best Live Action Short Drama at the 4th Canadian Screen Awards, and a shortlisted Jutra Award nominee for Best Short Film at the 17th Jutra Awards.

== Cast ==
- Alek Rzeszowski as Andrew Mynarski
- Robert Vilar as Pat Brophy the trapped rear gunner
- Annie St-Pierre as Annie St-Pierre
- Louis Negin as Mayor of Cambrai
- Eve Majzels and Maryse Lebeau as women of Cambrai
