= Suzie Bastien =

Canadian playwright (1963–2021)

Suzie Bastien was the pen name of Diane Jean (March 23, 1963 – July 26, 2021), a Canadian playwright from Montreal, Quebec. She was most noted for her 2019 play Sucré seize (Huit filles), which was a Governor General's Award nominee for French-language drama at the 2020 Governor General's Awards, and was adapted by Alexa-Jeanne Dubé into the 2023 feature film Sweet Sixteen (Sucré seize).

== Works ==
- Le désir de Gobi, 2003
- Ceux qui l'ont connu, 2005
- Epicentre, 2016
- LukaLila, 2017
- L'effritement 1 et 2, 2017
- L'enfant revenant, 2018
- Sucré seize (Huit filles), 2019
