= The Remaining Days =

2004 Canadian short film

- French: Les Derniers jours
- Directed by: Simon-Olivier Fecteau
- Written by: Simon-Olivier Fecteau
- Produced by: Simon-Olivier Fecteau; Jean-François Lord; Guillaume Lespérance
- Starring: Isidore Lapin
- Cinematography: Jean-François Lord
- Edited by: Simon-Olivier Fecteau
- Production company: Locomotion Films
- Release date: 2004 (FCIAT)
- Running time: 8 minutes
- Country: Canada
- Language: French

The Remaining Days (French: Les Derniers jours) is a Canadian short comedy film, directed by Simon-Olivier Fecteau and released in 2004. The film stars Isidore Lapin as Gaston, an elderly man who discovers an old forgotten copy of his bucket list while cleaning out his closet, and decides to use his remaining days to carry out all the things he still hasn't done.

The film premiered at the Abitibi-Témiscamingue International Film Festival in 2004.

The film received a Genie Award nomination for Best Live Action Short Drama at the 26th Genie Awards in 2006.
