= Gaëlle d'Ynglemare =

Canadian film director and screenwriter

Gaëlle d'Ynglemare, sometimes credited as Gaël d'Ynglemare, is a Canadian film director and screenwriter from Quebec. She is most noted for her 2004 short film Capacité 11 personnes, which won the Genie Award for Best Live Action Short Drama at the 21st Genie Awards.

Her first short film, Pas de deux sur chanson triste (1998), was a Jutra Award nominee for Best Live Action Short Film at the 1st Jutra Awards in 1999. She subsequently directed the short film No Vacancy (2006) and the documentary film MixMania, Le réveil (2006) before releasing her debut feature film Le Colis in 2011.

She followed up in 2021 with Livrés chez vous sans contact, a sketch comedy film starring the duo of Jean-Marie Corbeil and François Maranda. She is married to Jean-Marie Corbeil.
