= Follow the Fox =

2014 Canadian short film

- Film poster
- French: Suivre la piste du renard
- Directed by: Simon Laganière
- Written by: Simon Laganière
- Produced by: Mathieu Denis
- Starring: Mathieu Gosselin; Francis La Haye
- Cinematography: Geneviève Perron
- Edited by: Annie Jean
- Production companies: Art & Essai
- Release date: 2014
- Running time: 18 minutes
- Country: Canada
- Language: French

Follow the Fox (French: Suivre la piste du renard) is a Canadian short drama film, directed by Simon Laganière and released in 2014. The film stars Mathieu Gosselin and Francis La Haye as Richard and Clément, two brothers planning a bicycle ride across Canada to raise money after their grandfather is diagnosed with cancer.

The film was a Canadian Screen Award nominee for Best Live Action Short Drama at the 3rd Canadian Screen Awards, and a Prix Jutra nominee for Best Short Film at the 17th Jutra Awards.
