= In the Jam Jar =

2021 Canadian short drama film

- Directed by: Colin Nixon
- Written by: Colin Nixon
- Produced by: Étienne Hansez
- Starring: France Castel; Alain Goulem
- Cinematography: Natan B. Foisy
- Edited by: Philippe Lefebvre
- Music by: Anaïs Larocque
- Production company: Bravo Charlie
- Distributed by: H264 Distribution
- Release date: October 9, 2021 (FNC)
- Running time: 13 minutes
- Country: Canada
- Language: English

In the Jam Jar is a Canadian short drama film, directed by Colin Nixon and released in 2021. A tribute to maternal love, the film stars France Castel as Joan, a dying woman who is being cared for by her son Dan (Alain Goulem).

Despite featuring francophone actors, the film's dialogue was shot in English and subtitled in French for francophone audiences.

The film was screened in July 2021 as part of Telefilm Canada's annual Not Short on Talent showcase of Canadian short films at the Cannes Film Market. It had its official public premiere at the 2021 Festival du nouveau cinéma, where it won both the juried and audience-choice awards for Best Canadian Short Film.

The film was a Canadian Screen Award nominee for Best Live Action Short Drama at the 10th Canadian Screen Awards, and a Prix Iris nominee for Best Live Action Short Film at the 24th Quebec Cinema Awards.
