= My Boy (2018 film) =

2018 Canadian short film

- Film poster
- French: Mon Boy
- Directed by: Sarah Pellerin
- Written by: Sarah Pellerin
- Produced by: Fanny-Laure Malo; Sarah Pellerin; Annie-Claude Quirion
- Starring: Henri Richer-Picard; Marilyn Castonguay; Alexandre Landry
- Cinematography: Ariel Méthot-Bellemare
- Edited by: Charles Grenier
- Production company: La Boîte à Fanny
- Release date: September 2018 (TIFF)
- Running time: 12 minutes
- Country: Canada
- Language: French

My Boy (French: Mon Boy) is a Canadian short teen drama film, directed by Sarah Pellerin and released in 2018. The film stars Henri Richer-Picard as Louis, a shy, quiet teenager struggling with the rituals and codes of masculinity at his older brother's bachelor party.

The film premiered at the 2018 Toronto International Film Festival.

The film received a Prix Iris nomination for Best Short Film at the 21st Quebec Cinema Awards in 2019, and a Canadian Screen Award nomination for Best Live Action Short Drama at the 8th Canadian Screen Awards in 2020.
