= Léna Mill-Reuillard =

Canadian cinematographer and photographer

Léna Mill-Reuillard is a Canadian cinematographer and photographer. She is most noted as a two-time Canadian Screen Award nominee for Best Cinematography in a Documentary, receiving nods at the 4th Canadian Screen Awards in 2016 for Welcome to F.L. (Bienvenue à F.L.) and at the 8th Canadian Screen Awards in 2020 for City Dreamers, and a Prix Iris nominee for Best Cinematography in a Documentary at the 24th Quebec Cinema Awards in 2022 for Sisterhood (Ainsi soient-elles).

Her other film credits have included the films The Cut (La Coupe), Still Night, Still Light (Mes nuits feront écho), Pre-Drink, A Colony (Une colonie), No Ordinary Man, Fanmi, Joutel, Noemie Says Yes (Noémie dit oui), Days (Les Jours) and Nesting (Peau à peau).

As a photographer, she was a nominee for the Prix nouvelle génération de photographe in 2021.

She is an alumna of the Université du Québec à Montréal.
