= Hello Stranger (2024 film) =

2024 Canadian short documentary film

- Directed by: Amélie Hardy
- Written by: Amélie Hardy; Cooper Josephine
- Produced by: Fanny Drew; Sarah Mannering
- Starring: Cooper Josephine
- Cinematography: Myriam Payette
- Edited by: Amélie Hardy
- Music by: Joseph Marchand
- Production company: Colonelle Films
- Distributed by: h264 Distribution
- Release date: March 10, 2024 (SXSW)
- Running time: 16 minutes
- Country: Canada
- Language: English

Hello Stranger is a Canadian short documentary film, directed by Amélie Hardy and released in 2024. The film centres on Cooper Josephine, a trans woman battling familial and social prejudices as she embarks on her transition.

The film premiered at the 2024 South by Southwest Film & TV Festival.

== Awards ==
Year	Award	Category	Result	Ref.
2024	Palm Springs International Festival of Short Films	Young Cineastes Award	Honored	
2024	Calgary International Film Festival	Best Short Documentary	Won	
2024	Whistler Film Festival	Canadian ShortWork	Won	
2025	Prix collégial du cinéma québécois	Best Short Film	Nominated	
2025	Canadian Screen Awards	Best Short Documentary	Won	
2025	Inside Out Film and Video Festival	Best Canadian Short Film	Won	
