= Aspiration (film) =

2002 Canadian film

- Directed by: Constant Mentzas
- Written by: Sylvain Arcand; Constant Mentzas
- Produced by: Constant Mentzas
- Starring: Nicolino Marinacci
- Cinematography: Constant Mentzas
- Edited by: Constant Mentzas
- Production company: Cosmodeon Films
- Release date: 2002
- Running time: 12 minutes
- Country: Canada

Aspiration is a Canadian short drama film, directed by Constant Mentzas and released in 2002. The film is a silent depiction of a man (Nicolino Marinacci)'s isolation and anguish.

The film was a Jutra Award nominee for Best Live Action Short Film at the 5th Jutra Awards in 2003. It was subsequently screened at the 2003 Toronto International Film Festival, where it won the award for Best Canadian Short Film; in his acceptance speech, Mentzas joked that he knew he had won the award when he realized that he was the only director of a Canadian short film who had been invited to the awards luncheon, before thanking the jury for paying attention to the film and not falling asleep.
