= Like a House on Fire (film) =

2021 Canadian drama film

- Directed by: Jesse Noah Klein
- Written by: Jesse Noah Klein
- Produced by: Fanny Drew; Sarah Mannering; William Woods
- Starring: Sarah Sutherland; Jared Abrahamson; Dominique Provost-Chalkley
- Cinematography: Ariel Méthot-Bellemare
- Edited by: Richard Comeau
- Music by: Christophe Lamarche-Ledoux
- Production companies: Colonelle Films; Woods Entertainment
- Distributed by: Entract Films
- Release date: March 26, 2021
- Running time: 84 minutes
- Country: Canada
- Language: English

Like a House on Fire is a Canadian drama film, directed by Jesse Noah Klein and released in 2021. The film stars Sarah Sutherland and Jared Abrahamson.

== Plot ==
Dara returns home two years after running away from her family due to post-partum depression. She learns that her daughter, Isabel, does not remember her and that her husband, Danny, has started a new relationship with Therese, who is seven months pregnant. Dara moves in with her father and stepmother, Jack and Audrey. While trying to earn Danny's trust, and form a relationship with Isabel, Dara also builds the courage to face her own mother, Katherine, who abandoned her as a baby and does not know Dara at all.

== Production ==
The film is a coproduction by Colonelle Films from Quebec and Woods Entertainment from Ontario.

== Cast ==
- Sarah Sutherland as Dara
- Jared Abrahamson as Danny
- Dominique Provost-Chalkley as Therese
- Margaux Vaillancort as Isabel
- Amanda Brugel as Audrey
- Hubert Lenoir as Jordan
- Sheila McCarthy as Katherine
- Yanna McIntosh as Nancy
- Michael Riley as Jack

== Release ==
The film was screened for film critics and distributors in the Industry Selects film market at the 2020 Toronto International Film Festival, but was not made available for viewing by the general public. It had its commercial premiere on March 26 at the Cinéma du Parc in Montreal, before being released to video on demand streaming platforms in both English and French versions on March 30.

== Critical response ==
André Duchesne of La Presse rated the film three and a half stars, praising the performances of Sutherland and Abrahamson.

Writing for The Film Stage, Jared Mobarak also reviewed the film positively, writing that "Sutherland is great in the lead role. We see when Dara’s putting on a front and when that façade cracks under the pressure of pretending she can outrun what’s hiding beneath. Abrahamson moves between the emotions of being close to her and knowing that that closeness is no longer possible with authenticity as Provost-Chalkley proves the unsung MVP of the whole thanks to the compassion her Thérèse provides without fail from the moment she enters the frame. Klein could have written their two characters very differently and pushed Dara to a much darker place as a result, but he chose to embrace hope instead. While it’s not the hope she had of preserving her family, the opportunity to enter theirs and share it is hope just the same."
