= Hit and Run (2002 film) =

2002 Canadian film

- Directed by: Richard Jutras
- Written by: Richard Jutras
- Produced by: Ginette Petit; Éric Beauséjour
- Starring: Isabelle Miquelon; Serge Dupire
- Cinematography: James Gray
- Edited by: Stéphane Olivier
- Music by: Alain Blais
- Production company: Locomotion Films
- Distributed by: Christal Films
- Release date: September 30, 2002 (FIFF)
- Running time: 10 minutes
- Country: Canada
- Language: French

Hit and Run is a Canadian short drama film, directed by Richard Jutras and released in 2002. Adapted from Jean-Marc Dalpé's short theatrical monologue "Give the Lady a Break", the film stars Isabelle Miquelon as a woman processing and expressing her anger after her husband (Serge Dupire) leaves her for a younger woman.

The film premiered at the 2002 Festival International du Film Francophone de Namur.

The film won the Jutra Award for Best Live Action Short Film at the 5th Jutra Awards, and was a Genie Award nominee for Best Live Action Short Drama at the 23rd Genie Awards.
