= Stéphane Breton (actor) =

Canadian actor

Stéphane Breton

Stéphane Breton (Lévis, Québec) is a Canadian actor. He graduated from the Conservatoire d'art dramatique de Montréal in 1996.

== Filmography ==
He has appeared in various TV series including:

- Smash (TV series) (as Martial the trainer of François)
- 2 frères (Michel Guilbert)
- Mon meilleur ennemi (Michel Lebeau)
- Les Invincibles (Martin)
- Dans une galaxie près de chez vous (Extraterrestre mâle)
- District 31

In film he has appeared in:

- Le Petit ciel (2000),
- Québec-Montréal (2002)
- Red Nose (Nez rouge) (2003).
- Il était une fois dans le trouble in the role of Réal
- The Happiness of Others (Le Bonheur des autres) in 2011 as Yves
- French Kiss
- Camion 2012 directed by Rafaël Ouellet
- Mimine - 2021
