= Nina Roza =

2026 film by Geneviève Dulude-De Celles

- Canadian theatrical release poster
- Directed by: Geneviève Dulude-De Celles
- Written by: Geneviève Dulude-De Celles
- Produced by: Fanny Drew; Sarah Mannering
- Starring: Galin Stoev; Chiara Caselli; Christian Bégin
- Cinematography: Alexandre Nour Desjardins
- Edited by: Damien Keyeux
- Production companies: Colonelle Films; Ginger Light; Premier Studio; Echo Bravo; UMI Films
- Distributed by: Entract Films (Canada)
- Release dates: February 16, 2026 (Berlinale); April 22, 2026 (Canada); October 9, 2026 (Bulgaria)
- Running time: 103 minutes
- Countries: Canada; Belgium; Bulgaria; Italy
- Languages: Bulgarian; French

Nina Roza is a 2026 drama film written and directed by Geneviève Dulude-De Celles. It stars Galin Stoev as Mihail, a Bulgarian immigrant to Canada who works as an art curator, and must face his past when his employer (Christian Bégin) asks him to return to his home country for the first time in 30 years to investigate the veracity of a viral video depicting a Bulgarian child art prodigy.

The film had its world premiere in the main competition of the 76th Berlin International Film Festival on February 16, 2026, where it won the Silver Bear for Best Screenplay. It was theatrically released in Canada by Entract Films on April 24.

It was also selected as Canada's submission for the Best International Feature Film award at the 99th Academy Awards.

== Cast ==
- Galin Stoev as Mihail
- Christian Bégin
- Chiara Caselli
- Sofia Stanina
- Michelle Tzontchev as Rose/Roza
- Mart Lachev
- Nikolay Mutafchiev
- Svetlana Yancheva
- Raphaël Fournier
- Sylvie Lemay
- Alexia Roc
- Maria-Radena Bozhkova

== Production ==
A co-production of companies from Canada, Belgium, Bulgaria and Italy, the film was shot in 2024. It was screened as a work-in-progress in the First Look program at the 78th Locarno Film Festival in 2025, winning the Urban Post First Look Award and the Jannuzzi Smith Award.

== Release ==
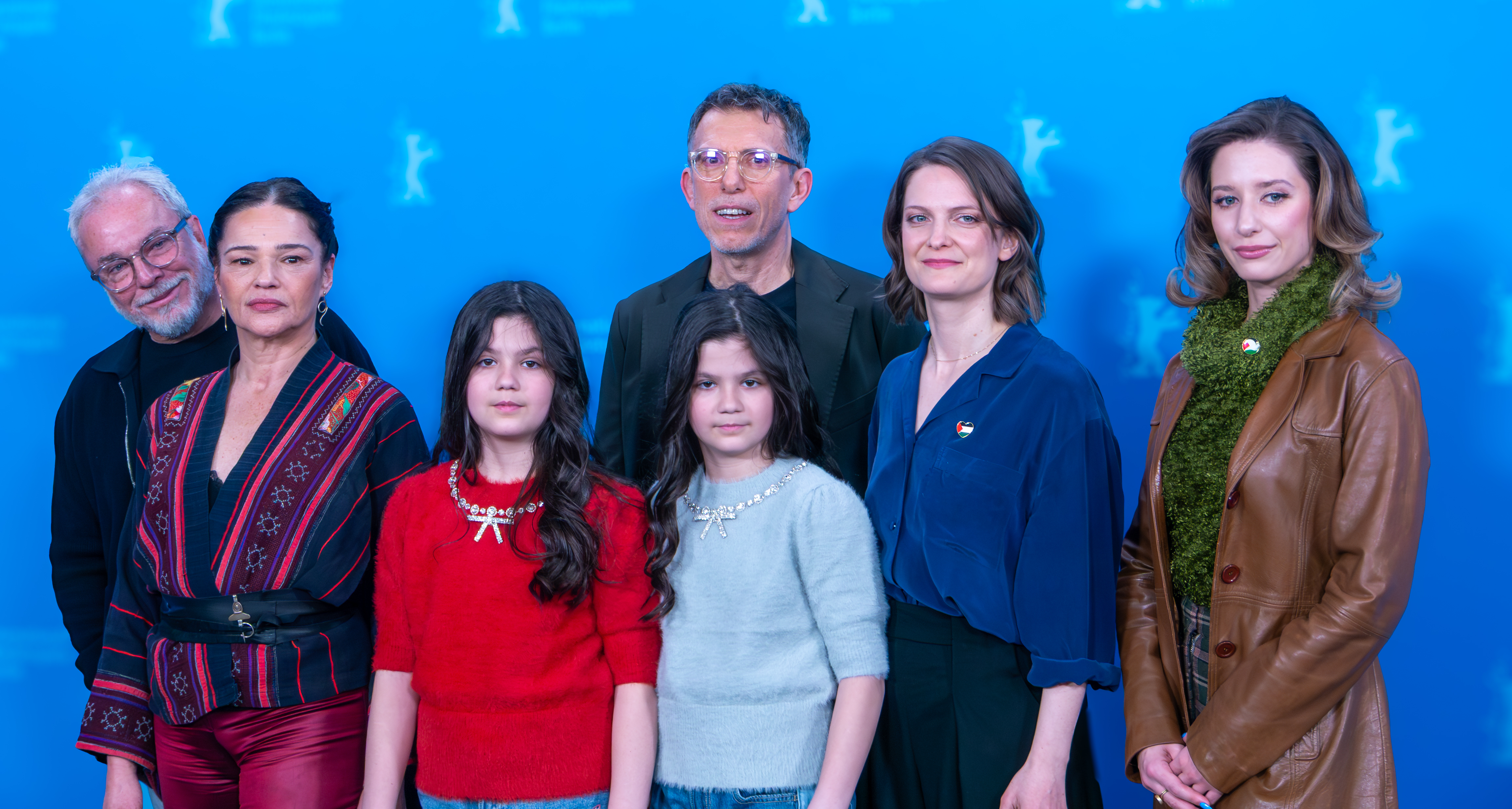
Cast and crew at the 76th Berlin International Film Festival

The film premiered in competition at the 76th Berlin International Film Festival.

Following its Canadian premiere on April 22 as the opening film of the 2026 Rendez-vous Québec Cinéma, it went into commercial release in Canada on April 24.

The film was selected as Canada's submission for the Academy Award for Best International Feature Film at the 99th Academy Awards in 2027. It will also screen at the Windsor International Film Festival, in competition for the $25,000 WIFF Prize in Canadian Film.

== Reception ==
On review aggregator Rotten Tomatoes, the film holds an approval rating of 80% based on 10 reviews, with an average rating of 6.4/10.

At the 2026 Vancouver International Film Festival, it won the Summit Award for Best Canadian Film.

== See also ==
- List of Canadian submissions for the Academy Award for Best International Feature Film
- List of submissions to the 99th Academy Awards for Best International Feature Film
