= Bluff (2007 film) =

- Directed by: Simon Olivier Fecteau; Marc-André Lavoie
- Written by: Marc-André Lavoie; Simon Olivier Fecteau
- Produced by: Marc-André Lavoie; Jean-René Parteneau; Simon Olivier Fecteau
- Starring: Rémy Girard; Pierre-François Legendre; Julie Perreault; Isabelle Blais; Emmanuel Bilodeau; Marie-Laurence Moreau
- Cinematography: Marc-André Lavoie
- Edited by: Simon-Olivier Fecteau; Marc-André Lavoie
- Music by: Frédéric Bégin
- Production company: Orange Films
- Distributed by: Seville Pictures
- Release date: August 23, 2007
- Running time: 88 minutes
- Country: Canada
- Language: French

Bluff is a 2007 Canadian comedy film. It was directed, written and produced by Simon Olivier Fecteau and Marc-André Lavoie.

The film premiered in August 2007 as the opening film of the Montreal World Film Festival, before going into commercial release in September.

== Plot ==
Taking place almost entirely within a single apartment, the film opens with a building inspector (Jean-Philippe Pearson) finding a shocking discovery in the basement to a building that is about to be destroyed. He contacts the landlord and, as the pair wait for a police officer (Denis Trudel) to show up, the story of this discovery comes uncovered through vignettes depicting the various tenants of the apartment over the previous 15 years.

Vignettes include the stories of Julien (Fecteau), a guy nervously preparing for a job interview with the assistance of his girlfriend (Ève Duranceau); Michel (Alexis Martin and Josée (Isabelle Blais), a couple desperately searching the apartment for a lost painting after learning that it might be worth over $100,000; Nico (Emmanuel Bilodeau) and Céline (Julie Perreault), a couple who have invited Serge (David La Haye) over for a ménage à trois; Patrice (Marc Messier) and Chuck (Nicolas Canuel), a pair of bumbling crooks who attempt to rob the landlord; and Georges (Rémy Girard), an older man who challenges his daughter Julie's (Marie-Laurence Moreau) boyfriend Sébastien (Pierre-François Legendre) to a boxing match in an attempt to prove his claim, believed by absolutely nobody he knows, that he was once a championship boxer.

The cast also includes Gilbert Sicotte and Raymond Bouchard.

== Recognition ==
Bluff was nominated for Best Original Screenplay at the 28th Genie Awards. Bilodeau received a Jutra Award nomination for Best Supporting Actor at the 10th Jutra Awards in 2008.
