= Capacité 11 personnes =

2004 Canadian short film

- Directed by: Gaëlle d'Ynglemare
- Written by: Gaëlle d'Ynglemare
- Produced by: Yves Fortin
- Cinematography: Francis Piquette
- Edited by: Gaëlle d'Ynglemare
- Music by: Olivier Auriol
- Production company: Productions Thalie
- Release date: 2004
- Running time: 10 minutes
- Country: Canada
- Language: French

Capacité 11 personnes is a Canadian comedy-drama short film, directed by Gaëlle d'Ynglemare and released in 2004. Set entirely in the elevator of an office building, the film depicts the interactions of various passengers as the elevator travels up and down the building. Its cast includes Nancy Bernier, Nicolas Canuel, Jean-Marie Corbeil, Évelyne de la Chenelière, Tristan Dubois, Marc Fortin, Bruno Landry, Linda Laplante, Denis Mercier and Pierre Verville.

The film was commercially distributed as an opening film at screenings of John L'Ecuyer's feature On the Verge of a Fever (Le Goût des jeunes filles) in 2005.

The film won the Genie Award for Best Live Action Short Drama at the 21st Genie Awards.
