= The Catch (2017 film) =

2017 Canadian film

- Directed by: Holly Brace-Lavoie
- Written by: Holly Brace-Lavoie
- Produced by: Sarah Mannering; Fanny Drew
- Starring: Charli Birdgenaw
- Cinematography: Joseph Baron
- Edited by: Sophie B. Sylvestre
- Music by: Sei Nakauchi Pelletier
- Production company: Colonelle Films
- Distributed by: h264 Distribution
- Release date: February 10, 2017 (Berlin)
- Running time: 14 minutes
- Country: Canada
- Language: English

The Catch is a Canadian short drama film, directed by Holly Brace-Lavoie and released in 2017. The film stars Charli Birdgenaw as Morgan, a young girl with a passion for fly fishing, who struggles with the fact that boys don't want to date her because of her interest in an activity that isn't stereotypically feminine.

The cast also includes Nafsika Baloukas, Sara Bradeen, Hannah Dorozio, Billy Iliopoulos and Joseph Napolitano.

The film premiered at the 67th Berlin International Film Festival in February 2017.

The film received a Prix Iris nomination for Best Live Action Short Film at the 20th Quebec Cinema Awards in 2018.
