= Sweet Sixteen (2023 film) =

2023 Canadian drama film

- French: Sucré seize
- Directed by: Alexa-Jeanne Dubé
- Written by: Suzie Bastien
- Produced by: Luce Pelletier
- Starring: Julie Boissonneault; Pénélope Ducharme; Laurence Trudelle; Charlène Beaubien; Roxane Lavoie; Doriane Lens-Pitt; Melania Balmaceda Venegas; Marie Reid
- Cinematography: Emili Mercier
- Edited by: Emma Bertin
- Music by: Guillaume Bourque; Éric Shaw
- Production company: Théâtre de l’Opsis
- Distributed by: H264 Distribution
- Release date: October 28, 2023 (Raindance)
- Running time: 65 minutes
- Country: Canada
- Language: French

Sweet Sixteen (French: Sucré seize) is a Canadian coming-of-age drama film, directed by Alexa-Jeanne Dubé and released in 2023. Adapted from the theatrical play of the same name by Suzie Bastien, the film centres on eight teenage girls, who each perform monologues about their hopes, dreams and struggles navigating young womanhood in modern society.

The girls are played by Julie Boissonneault, Pénélope Ducharme, Laurence Trudelle, Charlène Beaubien, Roxane Lavoie, Doriane Lens-Pitt, Melania Balmaceda Venegas and Marie Reid.

The film premiered at the 2023 Raindance Film Festival. It was subsequently screened at Cinemania, where it was the winner of the Jury Prize.

The film went into commercial release on March 8, 2024.
