= The Cut (2014 short film) =

2014 film

- Film poster
- French: La Coupe
- Directed by: Geneviève Dulude-De Celles
- Written by: Geneviève Dulude-De Celles
- Produced by: Fanny Drew; Sarah Mannering
- Starring: Milya Corbeil Gauvreau; Alain Houle
- Cinematography: Léna Mill-Reuillard
- Edited by: François Lamarche
- Production company: Colonelle Films
- Distributed by: 3.14 *Collectif
- Release date: January 18, 2014 (Sundance)
- Running time: 15 minutes
- Country: Canada
- Language: French

The Cut (French: La Coupe) is a Canadian short film, directed by Geneviève Dulude-De Celles and released in 2014. The film stars Milya Corbeil Gauvreau as Fanny, a young girl whose relationship with her father Yves (Alain Houle) is explored when her offer to cut his hair is interrupted by external events.

== Accolades ==
The film won the Short Film Jury Award for International Fiction at the 2014 Sundance Film Festival. At the 2014 Vancouver International Film Festival, Dulude-De Celles won the award for most promising director of a Canadian short film.

The film was named to the Toronto International Film Festival's year-end Canada's Top Ten list for 2014, and received a Canadian Screen Award nomination for Best Live Action Short Drama at the 3rd Canadian Screen Awards.
