= Constant Mentzas =

Canadian film director

- Born: 1978 (age 47–48); Montreal
- Known for: Film directing, screenwriting Restaurant work; Garde Côte and Palomar
- Notable work: Aspiration
- Awards: Best Canadian Short Film

Constant Mentzas (born 1978) is a Canadian film director, screenwriter and restaurateur from Montreal, Quebec. He is most noted for the short films Aspiration, which was a Jutra Award nominee for Best Live Action Short Film at the 5th Jutra Awards and won the award for Best Canadian Short Film at the 2003 Toronto International Film Festival, and Gilles, which was a Genie Award nominee for Best Live Action Short Drama at the 30th Genie Awards in 2010.

He subsequently left the film business to take over ownership and operation of Ikanos, his father's Greek restaurant in Montreal. In 2023, he rebranded Ikanos as Garde Côte and opened a new restaurant, Palomar in the Jean-Talon Market. Palomar is a fishmonger concept specializing in dry-aged fish and also operates as a café and wine bar.
