= Mutants (2016 film) =

- Directed by: Alexandre Dostie
- Written by: Alexandre Dostie
- Produced by: Hany Ouichou; Gabrielle Tougas-Fréchette
- Starring: Joseph DeLorey; Francis La Haye; Sandrine Bisson
- Cinematography: Vincent Biron
- Edited by: Stéphane Lafleur
- Music by: Christophe Lamarche-Ledoux
- Production companies: Art & Essai
- Distributed by: Travelling Distribution
- Release date: September 12, 2016 (TIFF)
- Running time: 17 minutes
- Country: Canada
- Language: French

Mutants is a Canadian short drama film, directed by Alexandre Dostie and released in 2016. The film stars Joseph DeLorey as Keven, a teenager who, after being injured at baseball practice, is sent on an unexpected emotional journey of discovery.

The film's cast also includes Francis La Haye and Sandrine Bisson.

== Awards ==
At TIFF, the film won the award for Best Canadian Short Film. It was subsequently named to the festival's year-end Canada's Top Ten list of the year's best short films.

At the 5th Canadian Screen Awards in 2017, the film won the Canadian Screen Award for Best Live Action Short Drama, and at the 19th Quebec Cinema Awards in 2017, the film won the award for Best Short Film.
