= Oh What a Wonderful Feeling =

- Directed by: François Jaros
- Produced by: François Jaros; Fanny-Laure Malo
- Starring: Ellen David; Louis Negin; Karelle Tremblay
- Cinematography: Olivier Gossot
- Edited by: François Jaros
- Music by: Olivier Alary
- Production company: La Boîte à Fanny
- Release date: May 15, 2016 (Cannes)
- Running time: 14 minutes
- Country: Canada

Oh What a Wonderful Feeling is a Canadian short drama film, directed by François Jaros and released in 2016. The film, an experimental drama described by Jaros as one in which he wanted "to have the narrative just outside of the frame; to suggest that there’s a bigger world, a bigger thing and something maybe meaner, more strange happening", largely depicts actions driven by offscreen events and features very little spoken dialogue.

The film's cast includes Patrice Beauchesne, Frédérike Bédard, Ellen David, Dany Gange, Catherine Hughes, Tania Kontoyanni, François Lambert, Dominique Laurence, Marguerite Laurence, Louis Negin, Sarah Pellerin, Karelle Tremblay and Zachary Tremblay.

The film premiered in the Critics' Week stream at the 2016 Cannes Film Festival.

The film was a shortlisted Prix Iris nominee for Best Short Film at the 19th Quebec Cinema Awards. At the 5th Canadian Screen Awards, the film was shortlisted for Best Live Action Short Drama.
