= Days (2023 film) =

2023 Canadian documentary film

- French: Les Jours
- Directed by: Geneviève Dulude-De Celles
- Written by: Geneviève Dulude-De Celles
- Produced by: Fanny Drew; Sarah Mannering
- Cinematography: Geneviève Dulude-De Celles; Léna Mill-Reuillard
- Edited by: Emmanuelle Lane
- Music by: Pierre-Philippe Côté
- Production company: Colonelle Films
- Distributed by: Maison 4:3
- Release date: May 6, 2023 (DOXA)
- Running time: 81 minutes
- Country: Canada
- Language: French

Days (French: Les Jours) is a Canadian documentary film, directed by Geneviève Dulude-De Celles and released in 2023. The film centres on Marie-Philip, a university graduate student who receives a breast cancer diagnosis at age 28, profiling her treatment journey over the next year of her life.

The film premiered on May 6, 2023, at the 2023 DOXA Documentary Film Festival, before going into commercial release in September.

== Awards ==
Award	Date of ceremony	Category	Recipient(s)	Result	Ref.
Canadian Screen Awards	May 2024	Best Sound Design in a Documentary	Sylvain Bellemare, Isabelle Lussier	Nominated	
Prix Iris	December 8, 2024	Best Documentary	Geneviève Dulude-De Celles, Fanny Drew, Sarah Mannering	Nominated	
Prix Iris	December 8, 2024	Best Editing in a Documentary	Emmanuelle Lane	Nominated	
Prix Iris	December 8, 2024	Best Original Music in a Documentary	Pierre-Philippe Côté	Nominated	
