= No Ghost in the Morgue =

2022 Canadian short comedy-drama film

- Directed by: Marilyn Cooke
- Written by: Marilyn Cooke
- Produced by: Kélyna N. Lauzier
- Starring: Schelby Jean-Baptiste; Mireille Métellus
- Cinematography: Juliette Lossky
- Edited by: Myriam Magassouba
- Music by: Pierre-Philippe Côté
- Production company: La 115e
- Distributed by: H264 Distribution
- Release date: March 9, 2022 (SBIFF)
- Running time: 16 minutes
- Country: Canada
- Language: English

No Ghost in the Morgue is a 2022 Canadian short comedy-drama film, written and directed by Marilyn Cooke. The film stars Schelby Jean-Baptiste as Keity, a medical student who takes an internship working in the morgue after failing to get her desired surgery placement, and repeatedly sees the ghost of her dead grandmother Myriam (Mireille Métellus).

The cast also includes Michel Laperrière, Ariane Bérubé and Alexandra Laferrière.

The film premiered in March 2022 at the Santa Barbara International Film Festival, and had its Canadian premiere at the 2022 Toronto International Film Festival.

The film was named to TIFF's annual year-end Canada's Top Ten list for 2022, and was a Canadian Screen Award nominee for Best Live Action Short Drama at the 11th Canadian Screen Awards in 2023.

It was a Prix Iris nominee for Best Live Action Short Film at the 25th Quebec Cinema Awards in 2023.
