= Herd Leader =

2012 Canadian film

- Film poster
- French: Chef de meute
- Directed by: Chloé Robichaud
- Written by: Chloé Robichaud
- Produced by: Fanny-Laure Malo; Chloé Robichaud; Sarah Pellerin
- Starring: Ève Duranceau
- Cinematography: Jessica Lee Gagné
- Edited by: Chloé Robichaud
- Production companies: La Boîte à Fanny; Les films de la meute
- Release date: May 26, 2012 (Cannes)
- Running time: 13 minutes
- Country: Canada
- Language: French

Herd Leader (French: Chef de meute) is a Canadian short drama film, directed by Chloé Robichaud and released in 2012. The film stars Ève Duranceau as Clara, a shy woman who must build confidence in herself when she inherits her late aunt's dog and has to learn how to train it.

The film premiered at the 2012 Cannes Film Festival, in the competitive short film program, and had its Canadian premiere at the 2012 Toronto International Film Festival.

The film was named to TIFF's annual year-end Canada's Top Ten list for 2012. In 2013, it was a Canadian Screen Award nominee for Best Live Action Short Drama at the 1st Canadian Screen Awards and a Prix Jutra nominee for Best Short Film at the 15th Jutra Awards.
