= Colin Nixon (director) =

Canadian film director

Colin Nixon is a Canadian film director from Cowansville, Quebec. He is most noted for his 2021 short film In the Jam Jar, which was a Canadian Screen Award nominee for Best Live Action Short Drama at the 10th Canadian Screen Awards, and a Prix Iris nominee for Best Live Action Short Film at the 24th Quebec Cinema Awards.

== Filmography ==
- The Marmot's Cry (Le cri de la marmotte) - 2016
- Jeez - 2017
- -21 - 2018
- In the Jam Jar - 2021
- Someone's Trying to Get In - 2024
- Ferret (Furet) - 2024
