= Little Victories (film) =

2025 Canadian short film directed by Rafaël Beauchamp

- French: Les Petites victoires
- Directed by: Rafaël Beauchamp
- Written by: Rafaël Beauchamp
- Produced by: Laurie Pominville
- Starring: Jean-Philippe Lehoux; Millie-Jeanne Drouin
- Cinematography: Simran Dewan
- Edited by: Alexis Viau
- Music by: Charles Humenry
- Production company: Coop Vidéo de Montréal
- Distributed by: Welcome Aboard
- Release date: June 2025
- Running time: 16 minutes
- Country: Canada

Little Victories (French: Les Petites victoires) is a Canadian short drama film, directed by Rafaël Beauchamp and released in 2025. Told without dialogue, the film centres on a terminally ill kart racing champion (Jean-Philippe Lehoux) spending his last autumn with his daughter (Millie-Jeanne Drouin).

The film premiered at Short Shorts Asia in June 2025, followed by a North American premiere at the Palm Springs International Festival of Short Films.

It had its Canadian premiere at the 29th Fantasia International Film Festival, where it was named by the Association des réalisateurs et réalisatrices du Québec (ARRQ) as one of the ten best short films by emerging Quebec directors in the Fantastique week-end du court métrage program.

== Awards ==
Award	Date of ceremony	Category	Recipient	Result	Ref.
Canadian Screen Awards	2026	Best Live Action Short Drama	Rafaël Beauchamp, Laurie Pominville	Nominated	
