= Mimine =

2021 Canadian short drama film

- Directed by: Simon Laganière
- Written by: Simon Laganière
- Produced by: Fanny Drew; Sarah Mannering
- Starring: Stéphane Breton; Laurent Lemaire; Émilie Lévesque
- Cinematography: Alexandre Lampron
- Edited by: Stéphane Lafleur
- Production company: Colonelle Films
- Distributed by: Travelling Distribution
- Release date: 2021
- Running time: 13 minutes
- Country: Canada
- Language: French

Mimine is a Canadian short drama film, directed by Simon Laganière and released in 2021. The film stars Stéphane Breton as Bonus, a divorced father whose son Mimine (Laurent Lemaire) is visiting for the day, who is trying to impress the boy with a special, magical experience out of fear that he will be replaced in Mimine's heart by his mother's new boyfriend.

The film won the award for Best Regional Film at the 2023 Festival Plein(s) Écran(s), and was a Canadian Screen Award nominee for Best Live Action Short Drama at the 11th Canadian Screen Awards.
