= Rafaël Beauchamp =

Canadian film director and screenwriter

Rafaël Beauchamp is a Canadian film director and screenwriter based in Montreal, Quebec. He is most noted for his 2025 short film Little Victories (Les petites victoires), which was a Canadian Screen Award nominee for Best Live Action Short Drama at the 14th Canadian Screen Awards in 2026.

Born in Magog and raised in Quebec City, he studied film at the Université du Québec à Montréal. He first became widely known for his 2023 short film The Fading (Les Battues), which premiered at the 2023 South by Southwest Film & TV Festival. Later that year he was named to the Sundance Institute's Ignite and Adobe Fellowship program for emerging directors.

His feature debut, Glass Eyes, was in development as of 2025.

== Filmography ==
- La fille du bain - 2018
- La Crise - 2020
- Beyond the Void (Au-delà du vide) - 2021
- The Fading (Les Battues) - 2023
- Little Victories (Les petites victoires) - 2025
- The Taste of Your Scales (Le goût de tes écailles) - 2026
