= Hope (2011 film) =

2011 Canadian short film

- Film poster
- Directed by: Pedro Pires
- Written by: Pedro Pires
- Based on: Jimmy, créature de rêve by Marie Brassard
- Produced by: Phoebe Greenberg; Penny Mancuso
- Starring: Bill Croft; Lucas Silveira
- Cinematography: Pedro Pires; Jean-François Lord
- Edited by: Pedro Pires; Aube Foglia
- Music by: Robert Marcel Lepage
- Production company: Phi
- Release date: September 12, 2011 (TIFF)
- Running time: 11 minutes
- Country: Canada

Hope is a Canadian short drama film, directed by Pedro Pires and released in 2011. Inspired by Marie Brassard's theatrical play Jimmy, créature de rêve, the film depicts a military general (Bill Croft) reflecting on his life as he lays dying on a battlefield.

The film premiered at the 2011 Toronto International Film Festival. It was subsequently screened in Montreal as the opening film for selected screenings of Lars von Trier's film Melancholia.

The film was named to TIFF's annual year-end Canada's Top Ten list for 2011. It was a Genie Award nominee for Best Live Action Short Drama at the 32nd Genie Awards, and a Prix Jutra nominee for Best Short Film at the 14th Jutra Awards.
