= Gilles (2008 film) =

2008 Canadian film

- Directed by: Constant Mentzas
- Written by: Sylvain Arcand; Constant Mentzas
- Produced by: Constant Mentzas
- Starring: Hélène Loiselle; Réjean Lefrançois
- Cinematography: John Ashmore
- Edited by: Stéphane Lafleur
- Production company: Les Films Cosmodéon
- Distributed by: Travelling Distribution
- Release date: August 10, 2008
- Running time: 14 minutes
- Country: Canada
- Language: French

Gilles is a Canadian short drama film, directed by Constant Mentzas and released in 2008. The film stars Hélène Loiselle as an elderly woman who has spent her life caring for her developmentally disabled son Gilles (Réjean Lefrançois), but who is now terminally ill and struggling to prepare him for the day he will have to move into assisted living.

The film was the last significant acting role for Loiselle, one of Quebec's major actresses of the 20th century, before her own death in 2013.

The film was a Genie Award nominee for Best Live Action Short Drama at the 30th Genie Awards in 2010.
