= Livrés chez vous sans contact =

- Directed by: Gaëlle d'Ynglemare
- Written by: Jean-Marie Corbeil; François Maranda
- Produced by: Jean-Marie Corbeil; François Maranda
- Starring: Jean-Marie Corbeil; François Maranda
- Cinematography: Jean-Philippe Talbot
- Edited by: Guillaume Girard
- Production company: Productions La Firme
- Distributed by: Cinémas Guzzo
- Release date: June 18, 2021
- Running time: 77 minutes
- Country: Canada
- Language: French

Livrés chez vous sans contact ("Delivered to You Without Contact") is a Canadian comedy film, directed by Gaëlle d'Ynglemare and released in 2021. Starring the sketch comedy duo of Jean-Marie Corbeil and François Maranda, the film consists of a selection of comedy sketches, wrapped by a fictional frame story in which the duo respond to the lockdowns associated with the COVID-19 pandemic in Canada by setting up their own sketch comedy delivery service to perform sketches for people at their homes.

The film's cast also includes Michel Courtemanche, France Castel, Anne Casabonne and Luc Senay.

The film was conceived in 2020, after Corbeil and Maranda's real comedy tour was halted by the pandemic shutdowns, and was shot in the summer of 2020. The duo have described the film as inspired by the popularity of sketch comedy films in their childhoods, particularly those of Monty Python.

Following the reopening of public spaces in 2021, the film premiered theatrically on June 18, 2021. Some physical screenings were also presented as "double features", in which the screening was preceded or followed by Corbeil and Maranda performing a live stage show.
