= The Near Future (film) =

- Film poster
- French: Le futur proche
- Directed by: Sophie Goyette
- Written by: Madeleine David; Sophie Goyette
- Produced by: Sophie Goyette
- Starring: Patrice Berthomier
- Cinematography: Neil Oakshott; Philippe Roy
- Edited by: Jules Saulnier
- Music by: Éliane Préfonaine
- Release date: March 2012 (Saguenay)
- Running time: 19 minutes
- Country: Canada
- Language: French

The Near Future (French: Le futur proche) is a Canadian short drama film, directed by Sophie Goyette and released in 2012. The film stars Patrice Berthomier as Robin, a pilot for a small Quebec airline who learns of his mother's death, but goes through his day emotionally ambivalent about the news due to their complicated relationship.

The film premiered at the Saguenay International Short Film Festival (Regard sur le court métrage au Saguenay) in March 2012. It was subsequently screened at the 2012 Toronto International Film Festival, and at the 2013 Sundance Film Festival.

The film was a Canadian Screen Award nominee for Best Live Action Short Drama at the 1st Canadian Screen Awards, and a Prix Jutra nominee for Best Short Film at the 15th Jutra Awards.
