= BKS (film) =

2019 Canadian short film

- French: SDR
- Directed by: Alexa-Jeanne Dubé
- Written by: Marjorie Armstrong; Alexa-Jeanne Dubé
- Produced by: Émilie Mercier
- Starring: Victoria Diamond; Iannicko N'Doua-Légaré
- Cinematography: John Londono
- Edited by: Marie-Pier Dupuis
- Music by: Pierre-Philippe Côté
- Production company: À Deux
- Distributed by: Fragments Distribution
- Release date: October 14, 2019 (FNC)
- Running time: 11 minutes
- Country: Canada
- Language: French

BKS: Breakup Sex (French: SDR: Sexe de rupture) is a Canadian short film, directed by Alexa-Jeanne Dubé and released in 2019. The film stars Victoria Diamond as a woman narrating the story of her breakup with her boyfriend (Iannicko N'Doua-Légaré), using ASMR-based sound design to accentuate the viewer's emotional response.

The film premiered at the 2019 Festival du nouveau cinéma.

The film was a Prix Iris nominee for Best Live Action Short Film at the 22nd Quebec Cinema Awards in 2020.
