= Shooting Star (2020 film) =

2020 Canadian film

- French: Comme une comète
- Directed by: Ariane Louis-Seize
- Written by: Ariane Louis-Seize
- Produced by: Fanny Drew; Sarah Mannering
- Starring: Marguerite Bouchard; Whitney Lafleur; Patrick Hivon
- Cinematography: Shawn Pavlin
- Edited by: Stéphane Lafleur
- Music by: Pierre-Philippe Côté
- Production company: Colonelle Films
- Release date: September 14, 2020 (TIFF)
- Running time: 23 minutes
- Country: Canada
- Language: French

Shooting Star (French: Comme une comète) is a 2020 Canadian short drama film, written and directed by Ariane Louis-Seize. The film stars Marguerite Bouchard as Chloé, a teenage girl travelling with her mother Nathalie (Whitney Lafleur) and her mother's boyfriend Christopher (Patrick Hivon) to observe shooting stars, only to begin developing a sexual and romantic attraction of her own to Christopher.

The film premiered at the 2020 Toronto International Film Festival. It was subsequently screened at the Abitibi-Témiscamingue International Film Festival, where it won the Prix Télébec, and at the Whistler Film Festival, where it won the award for Best Canadian ShortWork.

The film received a Prix Iris nomination for Best Live Action Short Film at the 23rd Quebec Cinema Awards in 2021.
