= Welcome to F.L. =

- Film poster
- French: Bienvenue à F.L.
- Directed by: Geneviève Dulude-De Celles
- Written by: Geneviève Dulude-De Celles
- Produced by: Fanny Drew; Sarah Mannering
- Cinematography: Léna Mill-Reuillard; Étienne Roussy
- Edited by: Emmanuelle Lane
- Music by: Peter Venne
- Production company: Colonelle Films
- Release date: September 10, 2015 (TIFF)
- Running time: 75 minutes
- Country: Canada
- Language: French

Welcome to F.L. (French: Bienvenue à F.L.) is a Canadian documentary film, directed by Geneviève Dulude-De Celles and released in 2015. The film profiles the students of École secondaire Fernand-Lefebvre in Sorel-Tracy, Quebec, as they embark on an art project to beautify their school, and features them discussing their perspectives on issues, such as bullying and peer pressure, that are endemic to student environments.

The film premiered at the 2015 Toronto International Film Festival.

The film received two Canadian Screen Award nominations at the 4th Canadian Screen Awards in 2016, for Best Cinematography in a Documentary (Léna Mill-Reuillard and Étienne Roussy) and Best Editing in a Documentary (Emmanuelle Lane).
