= Emmanuelle Lane =

Canadian film editor

Emmanuelle Lane is a Canadian film editor from Quebec.

== Filmography ==
=== Film ===
- Under Two Skies - 2010
- Ludivines - 2013
- Épicentres - 2013
- Welcome to F.L. (Bienvenue à F.L.) - 2015
- Our Family - 2017
- Cities Held Hostage (Main basse sur la ville) - 2017
- If This Isn't Love - 2018
- Fuck You Eric - 2018
- Secreto - 2019
- Little Waves (Les Petites vagues) - 2019
- Gabor - 2021
- Petites morts - 2022
- Days (Les Jours) - 2023
- Lumen - 2024
- The Punk of Natashquan (Le Punk de Natashquan) - 2025

=== Television ===
- Restoration Garage - 2013
- Les Brutes - 2016
- Avec moi - 2019
- La Une - 2021
- Ça prends pas la tchas à Papineau - 2023

== Awards ==
| Award | Date of ceremony | Category | Recipient(s) | Result | Ref(s) |
|---|---|---|---|---|---|
| Canadian Screen Awards | 2016 | Best Editing in a Documentary | Welcome to F.L. (Bienvenue à F.L.) | Nominated | |
| Prix Iris | 2023 | Best Editing in a Documentary | Gabor | Nominated | |
| Prix Iris | 2024 | Best Editing in a Documentary | Days (Les Jours) | Nominated | |
