= Marilyn Cooke =

Canadian filmmaker

Marilyn Cooke is a Canadian filmmaker from Montreal, Quebec. She is most noted for her 2022 short film No Ghost in the Morgue, which was a Canadian Screen Award nominee for Best Live Action Short Drama at the 11th Canadian Screen Awards, and a Prix Iris nominee for Best Live Action Short Film at the 25th Quebec Cinema Awards.

She previously directed the short films Nothing But Us (Envers et contre nous) and Wanted: Strong Woman. Her debut feature film, La Fille du mangier, entered production in 2023.
