= Plain and Simple (film) =

- French: Tout simplement
- Directed by: Raphaël Ouellet
- Written by: Sarah Pellerin
- Produced by: Annick Blanc
- Starring: Marguerite D'Amour; Aldéric Kenne
- Cinematography: Jessica Lee Gagné
- Edited by: Olivier Binette
- Distributed by: La Distributrice de Films
- Release date: 2016
- Running time: 12 minutes
- Country: Canada
- Language: French

Plain and Simple (French: Tout simplement) is a Canadian short drama film, directed by Raphaël Ouellet and released in 2016.

The film centres on four people struggling with feelings of isolation and loneliness.

The film was screened at the Cannes Film Market before having its theatrical premiere at the 2016 Toronto International Film Festival.

The film received a nomination for Best Short Film at the 19th Quebec Cinema Awards, and a Canadian Screen Award nomination for Best Live Action Short Film at the 6th Canadian Screen Awards.
