= Red (2005 film) =

- French: Le Rouge au sol
- Directed by: Maxime Giroux
- Written by: Alexandre Laferrière
- Produced by: Paul Barbeau
- Starring: Martin Dubreuil; Monique Pion
- Cinematography: Sara Mishara
- Edited by: Mathieu Bouchard-Malo
- Music by: Martin Pelland
- Production company: NuFilms
- Release date: 2005
- Running time: 16 minutes
- Country: Canada
- Language: French

Red (French: Le Rouge au sol) is a Canadian short drama film, directed by Maxime Giroux and released in 2005. The film stars Martin Dubreuil as Christian, a man struggling with alcoholism who opens up about his feelings to his mother (Monique Pion) during a shopping trip to Ikea.

The film won the Genie Award for Best Live Action Short Drama at the 27th Genie Awards, and was a shortlisted Jutra Award nominee for Best Short Film at the 8th Jutra Awards.
