= Joutel (film) =

2021 Canadian short drama film

- Directed by: Alexa-Jeanne Dubé
- Written by: Alexa-Jeanne Dubé
- Produced by: Geneviève Gosselin-G.
- Starring: Pierre Curzi; Marie Tifo
- Cinematography: Léna Mill-Reuillard
- Edited by: Marie-Pier Dupuis
- Music by: Pierre-Philippe Côté
- Production company: Unité centrale
- Distributed by: H264 Distribution
- Release date: October 9, 2021 (FNC)
- Running time: 15 minutes
- Country: Canada
- Language: French

Joutel is a Canadian short drama film, directed by Alexa-Jeanne Dubé and released in 2021. The film stars Pierre Curzi and Marie Tifo as Gérard and Jocelyne, an elderly couple who decide, upon finding a dead raccoon in their yard, to take a trip to bury it on their former property in the ghost town of Joutel.

The film was screened as part of Telefilm Canada's annual Not Short on Talent lineup at the Cannes Film Market, and had its public premiere at the 2021 Festival du nouveau cinéma.

The film was a Prix Iris nominee for Best Live Action Short Film at the 24th Quebec Cinema Awards in 2022.
