= François Jaros =

François Jaros (born October 15, 1985) is a Canadian film and television director from Montreal, Quebec.

He is a two-time winner of the award for Best Live Action Short Film at the Prix Jutra/Iris, winning at the 17th Jutra Awards in 2015 for Life's a Bitch (Toutes des connes) and at the 18th Quebec Cinema Awards in 2016 for Maurice. For Maurice, he was also awarded at Fantasia's International Short Film Competition.

His 2016 film Oh What a Wonderful Feeling was also shortlisted in the same category at the 19th Quebec Cinema Awards in 2017, and was a shortlisted Canadian Screen Award nominee for Best Live Action Short Drama at the 5th Canadian Screen Awards.

Jaros is largely a self-taught filmmaker; after completing CEGEP education he applied to study film at Concordia University but was not successfully admitted to the program. According to Jaros, "I was proactive. I went on and did films instead of studying them."

He has also directed episodes of the television series En tout cas and the web series Adulthood (L'Âge adulte).
