= Alexandre Dostie =

Canadian film director

Alexandre Dostie is a Canadian film director whose debut short film, Mutants, was released in 2016. The film won the Toronto International Film Festival award for Best Canadian Short Film at the 2016 Toronto International Film Festival, the Canadian Screen Award for Best Live Action Short Drama at the 5th Canadian Screen Awards, and the Prix Iris for Best Live Action Short Film at the 19th Quebec Cinema Awards.

Originally from the Beauce region of Quebec, Dostie is currently based in Trois-Rivières.

I'll End Up in Jail (Je finirai en prison) premiered in 2019 and received a Prix Iris nomination for Best Live Action Short Film at the 22nd Quebec Cinema Awards.

BOA premiered at the 78th Locarno Film Festival in 2025.
