= Marie-Pier Dupuis =

Canadian film director and editor

Marie-Pier Dupuis is a Canadian film director and editor from Quebec. She is most noted for her short film Heat Spell (L'Été des chaleurs), which was a Canadian Screen Award nominee for Best Live Action Short Drama at the 12th Canadian Screen Awards in 2024, and her work on the film Solo, for which she received a Prix Iris nomination for Best Editing at the 26th Quebec Cinema Awards in 2024.

Her other editing credits have included the films BKS (SDR), Joutel, Until You Die (Jusqu'à ce que tu meures) and Afterwards (Après-coups).
