= Remember Me (2013 film) =

2013 Canadian short film

- French: Mémorable moi
- Directed by: Jean-François Asselin
- Written by: Jean-François Asselin
- Produced by: Jean-François Asselin
- Starring: Émile Proulx-Cloutier
- Cinematography: André Turpin
- Edited by: Simon Sauvé
- Music by: Mathieu Vanasse
- Release date: September 7, 2013 (TIFF)
- Running time: 15 minutes
- Country: Canada
- Language: French

Remember Me (French: Mémorable moi) is a Canadian short science fiction film, directed by Jean-François Asselin and released in 2013. The film stars Émile Proulx-Cloutier as Mathieu, a man who is forced into increasingly dangerous situations to get noticed by other people because he fears he will cease to exist if he ever becomes forgotten.

The film premiered at the 2013 Toronto International Film Festival. It was subsequently screened at the Fantastic Fest in Austin, Texas, where it won the award for Best Short Film, Horror.

The film was a Canadian Screen Award nominee for Best Live Action Short Drama at the 2nd Canadian Screen Awards in 2014, and a Prix Jutra nominee for Best Short Film at the 16th Jutra Awards.
