= Alexa-Jeanne Dubé =

Canadian actress and film director

- Born: 1988 (age 37–38); Montreal, Quebec, Canada
- Occupations: Film director, actress
- Relatives: Christophe "CRi" Dubé (brother)

Alexa-Jeanne Dubé (1988; Montreal) is a Canadian actress and film director. She is most noted as a two-time Prix Iris nominee for Best Live Action Short Film, receiving nods at the 22nd Quebec Cinema Awards in 2020 for BKS (SDR), and at the 24th Quebec Cinema Awards in 2022 for Joutel.

As an actress she is most noted for the web series Féminin/Féminin, for which she was a Gémeaux Award nominee for Best Actress in a Web Series in 2015. She was also the narrator of Amélie Hardy's 2022 documentary film About Memory and Loss (Notes sur la mémoire et l'oubli).

Her feature film debut, Sweet Sixteen (Sucré seize), premiered in fall 2023 at the Raindance Film Festival.

She is the sister of electronic musician Christophe "CRi" Dubé, and directed the music video for his 2020 single "Never Really Get There".
