= Afterwards (2023 film) =

2023 Canadian documentary film

- French: Après-coups
- Directed by: Romane Garant Chartrand
- Produced by: Nathalie Cloutier
- Cinematography: Isabelle Stachtchenko
- Edited by: Marie-Pier Dupuis
- Music by: Frannie Holder
- Production company: National Film Board of Canada
- Release date: November 23, 2023 (RIDM)
- Running time: 24 minutes
- Country: Canada
- Language: French

Afterwards (French: Après-coups) is a Canadian short documentary film, directed by Romane Garant Chartrand and released in 2023. The film centres on a group of women who are participating in a support group to help each other recover and move on from having been victims of domestic violence.

The film premiered at the 2023 Montreal International Documentary Festival, and was subsequently screened at the 2024 Clermont-Ferrand International Short Film Festival.

== Awards ==
Award	Date of ceremony	Category	Recipient(s)	Result	Ref.
Prix Iris	December 8, 2024	Best Short Documentary	Romane Garant Chartrand, Nathalie Cloutier	Nominated	
Canadian Screen Awards	June 1, 2025	Best Short Documentary	Romane Garant Chartrand, Nathalie Cloutier	Nominated	
