= Simon-Olivier Fecteau =

Canadian actor and director (born 1975)

Simon-Olivier Fecteau (born July 28, 1975) is a Canadian director, actor, producer and screenwriter. He was nominated in 2008 for a Genie Award for Best Original Screenplay for Bluff with Marc-André Lavoie and David Gauthier. He was also the creator, writer, director, and star of the webseries "En audition avec Simon", where he plays an arrogant director who is auditioning actors. In 2014, he starred in the TV series "Ces gars-là" along with fellow Canadian comedian Sugar Sammy.

== Recognition ==
- 2008 Genie Award for Best Original Screenplay - Bluff - Nominee (with David Gauthier, David Gauthier)
- 2006 Genie Award for Best Live Action Short Drama - The Remaining Days (Les Derniers jours) - Nominated (shared with: Guillaume Lespérance, Jean-François Lord)
