= Pierre-Philippe Côté =

Canadian musician and composer

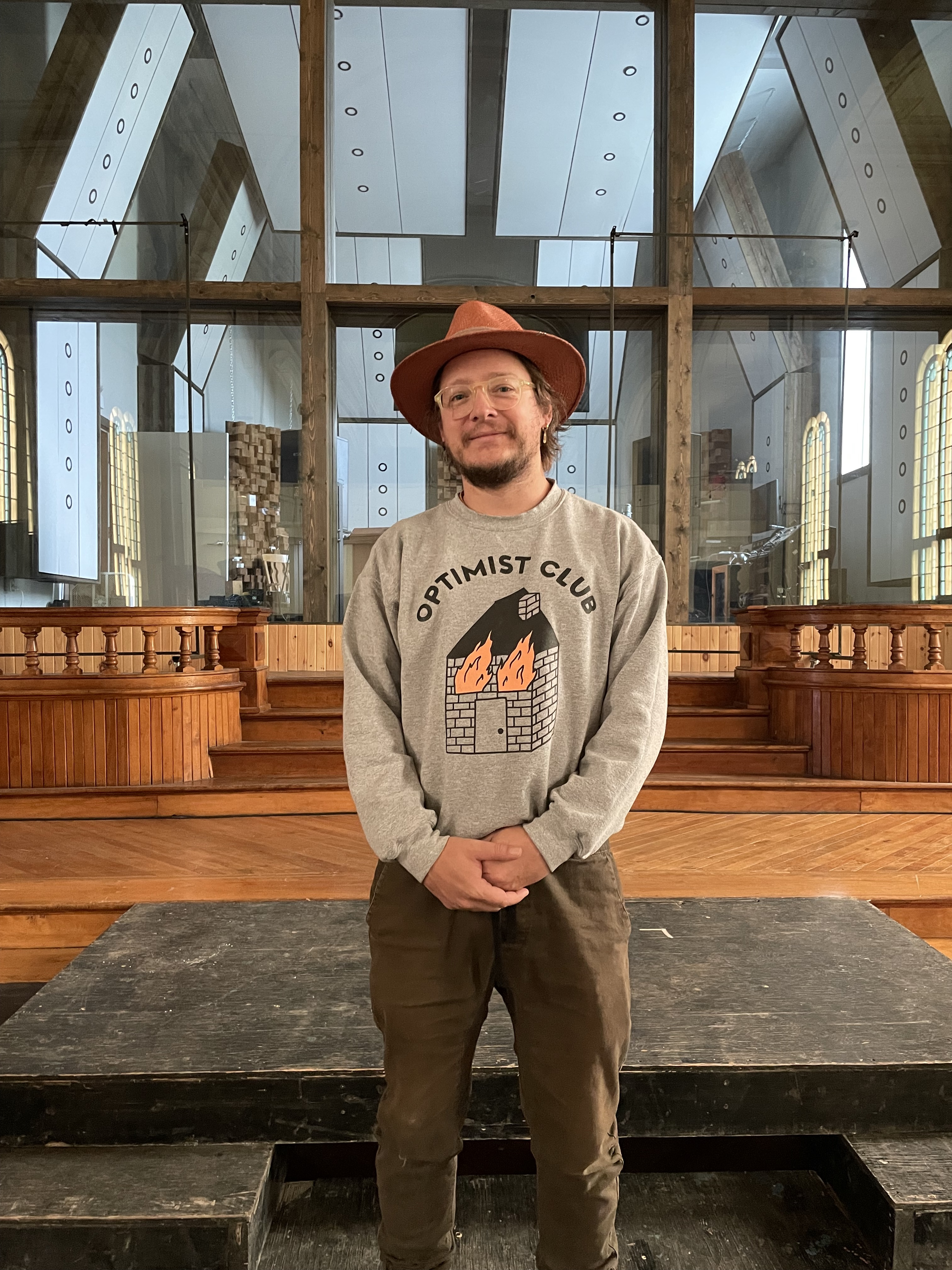

Pierre-Philippe Côté, also known by the stage names Pilou or Peter Henry Phillips, is a Canadian musician and composer from Quebec. He is most noted for his score to the 2017 film Ravenous (Les Affamés), for which he won the Prix Iris for Best Original Music at the 20th Quebec Cinema Awards, and was a Canadian Screen Award nominee for Best Original Score at the 6th Canadian Screen Awards.

Originally from Asbestos (Val-des-Sources), Quebec, he studied music at the Université du Québec à Montréal, where he was often commissioned to write music for films made by his friends in the film studies program. He subsequently formed the band Mimosa with singer Ines Talbi, who were the winners of the 2007 Francouvertes competition for emerging musical artists from Quebec. He later launched his own recording studio, Le Nid.

He has released albums as a recording artist under the names Peter Henry Phillips in English and Pilou in French, but is credited under his own name on film scores.

He is married to actress Geneviève Boivin-Roussy.

== Discography ==
- The Origin (2017, as Peter Henry Phillips)
- La Vraie Nature - Chansons Par Pilou (2018, as Pilou)

== Filmography ==
=== Film ===
- The Nomads of Oz - 2012
- An Eye for Beauty (Le règne de la beauté) - 2014
- Anime - 2017
- Blame - 2017
- Ravenous (Les Affamés) - 2017
- Upset Body (Corps contrarié) - 2017
- My Intelligent Comedy (Les Scènes fortuites) - 2018
- Cuba Merci-gracias - 2018
- Luz, a Witch Story (Luz, un film de sorcières) - 2019
- The Depths (Les Profondeurs) - 2019
- Evergreen (Cimes) - 2019
- BKS (SDR) - 2019
- Flashwood - 2020
- Shooting Star (Comme une comète) - 2020
- Monsters - 2021
- Une princesse chez les Généreux - 2021
- Joutel - 2021
- No Ghost in the Morgue - 2022
- Not Okay - 2022
- Nude (Nu) - 2022
- Of Night and Men (Des hommes, la nuit) - 2023
- Humanist Vampire Seeking Consenting Suicidal Person (Vampire humaniste cherche suicidaire consentant) - 2023
- Days (Les Jours) - 2023
- You Are Not Alone (Vous n'êtes pas seuls) - 2024
- Tight Lettuce (Tissé serré) - 2026

=== Television ===
- Blood on the Docks (Deux flics sur les docks) - 2014–16
- Switch & Bitch - 2015–16
- The Accident (L'Accident) - 2016–17
- Real Detective - 2016–17
- The Detectives - 2018–20
- The Case That Haunts Me - 2018

== Awards ==
Award	Year	Category	Work	Result	Ref(s)
Canadian Screen Awards	2018	Best Original Score	Ravenous (Les Affamés)	Nominated	
Prix Félix	2019	Other Language Album of the Year	La vraie nature – Chansons par Pilou	Nominated	
Prix Iris	2018	Best Original Music	Ravenous (Les Affamés)	Won	
Prix Iris	2024	Best Original Music	Humanist Vampire Seeking Consenting Suicidal Person (Vampire humaniste cherche suicidaire consentant)	Nominated	
Prix Iris	2024	Best Original Music in a Documentary	Days (Les Jours)	Nominated	
