= Like the Ones I Used to Know =

2021 Canadian short film

- French: Les grandes claques
- Directed by: Annie St-Pierre
- Written by: Daniel I. Schachter; Annie St-Pierre
- Produced by: Fanny Drew; Sarah Mannering
- Starring: Steve Laplante; Lilou Roy-Lanouette; Larissa Corriveau
- Cinematography: Étienne Roussy
- Edited by: Myriam Magassouba
- Music by: Christophe Lamarche-Ledoux
- Production company: Colonelle Films
- Distributed by: H264 Distribution
- Release date: January 28, 2021 (Sundance)
- Running time: 18 minutes
- Country: Canada
- Language: French

Like the Ones I Used to Know (French: Les grandes claques) is a Canadian short drama film, directed by Annie St-Pierre and released in 2021. The film stars Steve Laplante as Denis, a recently divorced father who is struggling with his emotions as he prepares to pick up his kids, including daughter Julie (Lilou Roy-Lanouette), at the home of his former in-laws on Christmas Eve.

The cast also includes Larissa Corriveau, Laurent Lemaire, Jérémy Tremblay Boudreau, Alice Charbonneau, Émir Cloutier, Catherine Dumas, Amélie Grenier, Jérémie Jacob, Mingo L'Indien, Marc Larrivée and Gilles Pilon.

The film premiered at the 2021 Sundance Film Festival.

== Awards ==
The film won the award for Best Canadian Short Film at the 2021 Saguenay International Short Film Festival, and the award for Best Canadian Short Film at the 2021 Festival international du cinéma francophone en Acadie.

It was named to the Toronto International Film Festival's annual year-end Canada's Top Ten list for 2021.

It was subsequently named to the initial shortlist for the Academy Award for Best Live Action Short Film for the 94th Academy Awards, but was not one of the final nominees.

The film was a Canadian Screen Award nominee for Best Live Action Short Drama at the 10th Canadian Screen Awards, and won the Prix Iris for Best Live Action Short Film at the 24th Quebec Cinema Awards.
