= Romane Garant Chartrand =

Canadian documentary filmmaker

Romane Garant Chartrand is a Canadian documentary filmmaker from Quebec. She is most noted for her 2023 short documentary film Afterwards (Après-coups), which was a Prix Iris nominee for Best Short Documentary at the 26th Quebec Cinema Awards in 2024, and a Canadian Screen Award nominee for Best Short Documentary at the 13th Canadian Screen Awards in 2025.

A graduate of the film studies program at the Université du Québec à Montréal, she made a number of short films and music videos before garnering wider attention in 2021 with her graduation film Love Me (Love-moi), which won the Roméo – Bourses Prize at the 2021 Rendez-vous Québec Cinéma and the Coup de cœur du jury award at the Plein(s) Écran(s) festival.
