= Geneviève Dulude-De Celles =

Canadian film director

- Born: 1986 (age 39–40); Canada
- Occupations: Film director; Screenwriter
- Years active: 2014 - present

Geneviève Dulude-De Celles is a Canadian film director, who received a Canadian Screen Award nomination for Best Director at the 7th Canadian Screen Awards in 2019 for her debut feature film A Colony (Une colonie).

== Career ==
She previously directed the short film The Cut (La Coupe), which was a nominee for Best Live Action Short Drama at the 3rd Canadian Screen Awards in 2015, and the documentary film Welcome to F.L.. In 2023 she released the documentary film Days (Les Jours).

In 2024 she completed production on her second narrative feature film, Nina Roza, which had its world premiere at the main competition of the 76th Berlin International Film Festival in February 2026, where it was nominated for the Golden Bear and won the Silver Bear for Best Screenplay. The film was selected as Canada's submission for the Academy Award for Best International Feature Film at the 99th Academy Awards in 2027.

She was a cofounder of Colonelle Films with Sarah Mannering and Fanny Drew.
