= Émile Proulx-Cloutier =

Canadian actor and musician (born 1983)

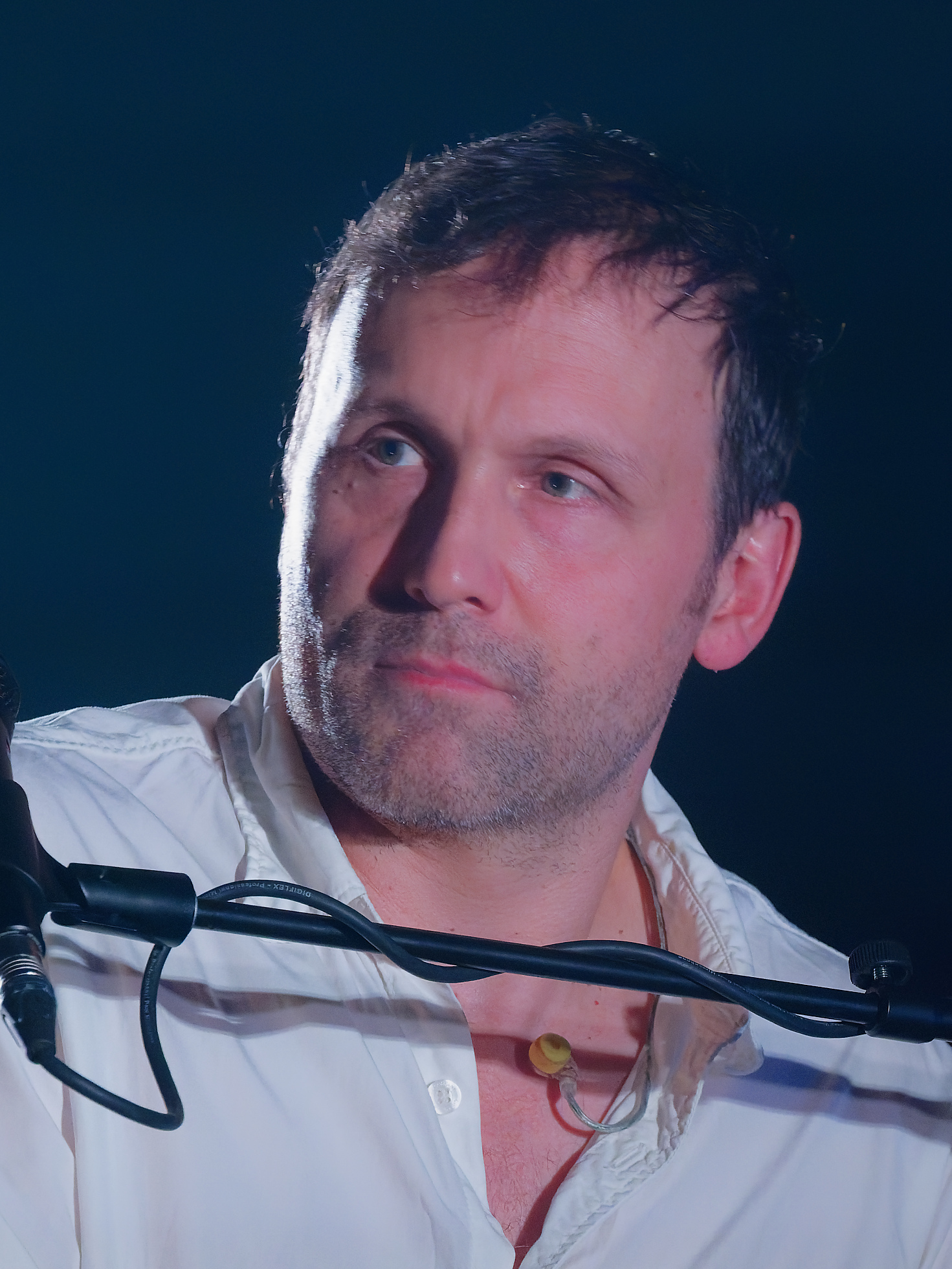
Proulx-Cloutier in 2026

Émile Proulx-Cloutier (born 1983) is a Canadian actor and musician. He is most noted for his performance in the film We Are the Others (Nous sommes les autres), for which he received a Canadian Screen Award nomination for Best Actor at the 6th Canadian Screen Awards.

His other roles have included the films Matusalem, The Ring, Le Banquet, The Deserter (Le Déserteur), Another House (L'Autre maison), Remember Me (Mémorable moi), La Bolduc, Mont Foster and The Time Thief (L'Arracheuse de temps), and the television series Deux frères, Les Hauts et les bas de Sophie Paquin, 30 vies, Plan B and Sortez-moi de moi. As a musician he has released two albums, Aimer les monstres (2014) and Marée haute (2017). He is also singer.

Proulx-Cloutier has also directed short films. His film Life Begins (La Vie commence) was a shortlisted Genie Award nominee for Best Live Action Short Drama at the 30th Genie Awards.

As a musician, Proulx-Cloutier received a SOCAN Songwriting Prize nomination in 2018 for his song "Petite valise".

== Personal life ==
Born in Montreal, Quebec, Émile Proulx-Cloutier is the son of actors Raymond Cloutier and Danielle Proulx.
