= Carmine Pierre-Dufour =

Canadian film director and screenwriter

Carmine Pierre-Dufour is a Canadian film director and screenwriter from Quebec. She is most noted as co-director with Émilie Mannering of the short film Mahalia Melts in the Rain, which was a shortlisted Canadian Screen Award nominee for Best Live Action Short Drama at the 7th Canadian Screen Awards in 2019.

Her 2021 film Fanmi, codirected with Sandrine Brodeur-Desrosiers, was named to the Toronto International Film Festival's annual year-end Canada's Top Ten list for 2021.

She has also been a writer and story editor for the television series Big Top Academy and Transplant.
