= Matthew Rankin =

Canadian experimental filmmaker

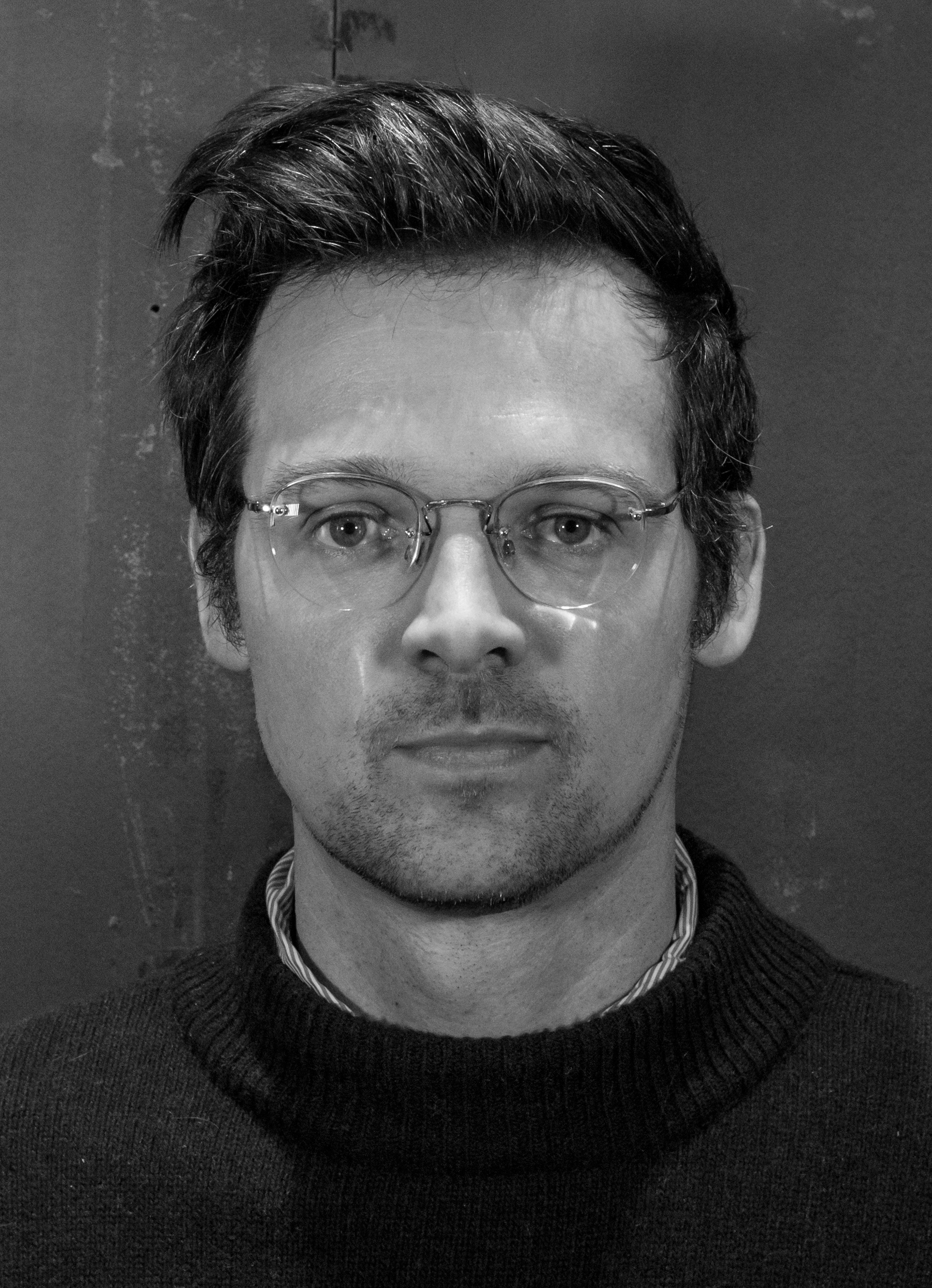
- Born: August 5, 1980 (age 46); Winnipeg, Manitoba, Canada
- Education: McGill University, Université Laval
- Occupation: Filmmaker

Matthew Rankin is a Canadian experimental filmmaker and actor. His feature-length debut, The Twentieth Century, premiered in 2019 and was nominated for eight Canadian Screen Awards, winning three.

He has also received accolades for his 2014 film Mynarski Death Plummet, which was a shortlisted Canadian Screen Award nominee for Best Live Action Short Drama at the 4th Canadian Screen Awards and a shortlisted Jutra Award nominee for Best Short Film at the 17th Jutra Awards, and his 2017 film The Tesla World Light, which won the Canadian Screen Award for Best Animated Short at the 6th Canadian Screen Awards and received an Honourable Mention for the Toronto International Film Festival Award for Best Canadian Short Film at the 2017 Toronto International Film Festival.

His second feature film, Universal Language (Une langue universelle), premiered in the Directors' Fortnight section of the 2024 Cannes Film Festival, The film was longlisted for the 2024 Jean-Marc Vallée DGC Discovery Award, and was selected as the Canadian entry for the Academy Award for the Best International Feature Film at the 97th Academy Awards.

Universal Language received 13 Canadian Screen Award nominations at the 13th Canadian Screen Awards in 2025, and won six awards including Best Director.

== Life ==
Originally from Winnipeg, Manitoba, he was associated with the Winnipeg Film Group as a teenager, and later studied history at McGill University, at Université Laval and at the Institut national de l'image et du son.

His father, Laird Rankin, was longtime executive director of Canada's National History Society and publisher of the history magazine The Beaver.

He has also appeared as an actor in films by other directors, including This House (Cette maison) and Before I Change My Mind, and portrayed one of the lead characters in his own film Universal Language.

== Filmography ==
=== As filmmaker ===
==== Short films ====
- 2003 - Je me souviens
- 2003 - Les deux McGill (Co-director: Walter Forsberg)
- 2003 - Weapons of Mass Destruction (Co-director: Walter Forsberg)
- 2005 - Le facteur poulpe
- 2006 - Où est Maurice? (Co-director: Alek Rzeszowski)
- 2006 - Kubasa in a Glass: The World of the Winnipeg TV Commercial (Co-director: Walter Forsberg)
- 2006 - Death by Popcorn: The Tragedy of the Winnipeg Jets (Co-directors: Mike Maryniuk, Walter Forsberg)
- 2006 - I Dream of Driftwood
- 2008 - Sharhé-Halé Shakhsi: M. Rankin
- 2008 - Cattle Call (Co-director: Mike Maryniuk)
- 2008 - Hydro-Lévesque
- 2008 - Barber Gull Rub
- 2010 - Negativipeg
- 2012 - Tabula Rasa
- 2014 - Mynarski Death Plummet
- 2014 - Exodus of the Year
- 2015 - The Radical Expeditions of Walter Boudreau
- 2015 - Ceci est un message officiel
- 2017 - The Tesla World Light
- 2022 - Municipal Relaxation Module
- 2023 - Federal Owl Commission

==== Feature-length films ====
- 2019 - The Twentieth Century
- 2024 - Universal Language
- 2026 - Ladies and Gentlemen, Brian Mulroney (Mesdames et Messieurs, Brian Mulroney)

=== Acting roles ===
- 2022 - Before I Change My Mind, as Daniel - directed by Trevor Anderson
- 2022 - This House (Cette maison), as Dr. Densmore - directed by Miryam Charles
- 2024 - Universal Language, as Matthew - directed by himself
- 2024 - Blue Heron, as the psychologist - directed by Sophy Romvari
- 2026 - So Long Pluto (Au revoir Pluton) as Clyde Tombaugh - directed by Sarianne Cormier
