= Émilie Mannering =

Canadian film director

Émilie Mannering is a Canadian film director. She is most noted for her short films Star, which was a Quebec Cinema Award nominee for Best Short Film at the 18th Quebec Cinema Awards and a Canadian Screen Award nominee for Best Live Action Short Drama at the 5th Canadian Screen Awards, and Mahalia Melts in the Rain, which was shortlisted for Best Live Action Short Drama at the 7th Canadian Screen Awards.

Mannering directed the feminist web-series, Les Brutes. Her 2019 film Jarvik was named to TIFF's annual year-end Canada's Top Ten list for short films.

Her 2022 short film À la vie à l'amor was a shortlisted finalist for the 2023 Prix collégial du cinéma québécois for short films, and a Canadian Screen Award nominee for Best Live Action Short Drama at the 11th Canadian Screen Awards.
