= Annie St-Pierre =

Canadian film director and producer

Annie St-Pierre is a Canadian film director and producer from Saint-Pascal, Quebec. She is most noted for her documentary film All That We Make (Fermières), which was a Canadian Screen Award nominee for Best Feature Length Documentary at the 3rd Canadian Screen Awards in 2015, and her narrative short film Like the Ones I Used to Know (Les Grandes claques), which was named to the initial shortlist for the Academy Award for Best Live Action Short Film for the 94th Academy Awards.

In 2024 she released the documentary film Your Higher Self (Le Plein potentiel).

In addition to her own films, St-Pierre has been a producer on Denis Côté's films Wilcox and Social Hygiene (Hygiène social).

She has also had occasional small acting roles, most notably in the films of Matthew Rankin.
