= List of Canadian films of 2019 =

This is a list of Canadian films released in 2019:

== Films ==
Title	Director	Cast	Notes	Ref
14 Days, 12 Nights (14 jours 12 nuits)	Jean-Philippe Duval	Anne Dorval, Leanna Chea, François Papineau		
2008	Blake Williams			
Acadiana	Guillaume Fournier, Samuel Matteau and Yannick Nolin			
The Acrobat (L'Acrobate)	Rodrigue Jean	Sébastien Ricard, Yury Paulau		
Alexander Odyssey (Alexandre le fou)	Pedro Pires	Alexandre Demard		
American Woman	Semi Chellas	Hong Chau, Sarah Gadon, Lola Kirke, Ellen Burstyn		
And the Birds Rained Down (Il pleuvait des oiseaux)	Louise Archambault	Andrée Lachapelle, Rémy Girard, Gilbert Sicotte	Adaptation of the novel by Jocelyne Saucier	
Anne at 13,000 Ft.	Kazik Radwanski	Deragh Campbell, Matt Johnson		
Antigone	Sophie Deraspe	Nahéma Ricci		
Apapacho	Marquise Lepage	Fanny Mallette, Laurence Leboeuf		
Aquaslash	Renaud Gauthier	Ryan Ali, Lanisa Dawn, Brittany Drisdelle		
Ash	Andrew Huculiak	Tim Guinee, Chelah Horsdal, Eric Keenleyside		
Assholes: A Theory	John Walker	John Cleese		
Barbarians of the Bay (Les Barbares de La Malbaie)	Vincent Biron	Philippe-Audrey Larrue-St-Jacques, Justin Leyrolles-Bouchard		
Because We Are Girls	Baljit Sangra	Jeeti Pooni, Kira Pooni, Salakshana Pooni		
Before We Explode (Avant qu'on explose)	Rémi St-Michel	Étienne Galloy, Julianne Côté		
BKS (SDR)	Alexa-Jeanne Dubé	Victoria Diamond, Iannicko N'Doua-Légaré		
Black Conflux	Nicole Dorsey	Ella Ballentine, Ryan McDonald, Luke Bilyk		
Blood Quantum	Jeff Barnaby	Elle-Máijá Tailfeathers, Forrest Goodluck, Kiowa Gordon, Kawennáhere Devery Jacobs, Gary Farmer		
Body and Bones	Melanie Oates	Kelly Van der Burg, Joel Thomas Hynes, Lawrence Barry		
The Body Remembers When the World Broke Open	Elle-Máijá Tailfeathers and Kathleen Hepburn	Elle-Máijá Tailfeathers, Violet Nelson		
Book of Hours	Annie MacDonell			
A Brother's Love (La femme de mon frère)	Monia Chokri	Evelyne Brochu, Niels Schneider		
Brotherhood	Richard Bell	Brendan Fletcher, Brendan Fehr, Jake Manley		
Canadian Strain	Geordie Sabbagh	Jess Salgueiro, Colin Mochrie, Naomi Snieckus, Maria Vacratsis, Thom Allison		
Cassy	Noël Mitrani	Natacha Mitrani, Ayana O'Shun, Stéphane Krau		
Castle in the Ground	Joey Klein	Alex Wolff, Imogen Poots, Neve Campbell		
Chaakapesh	Roger Frappier, Justin Kingsley	Kent Nagano, Tomson Highway		
Cityscape	Michael Snow			
Compulsive Liar (Menteur)	Émile Gaudreault	Louis-José Houde, Antoine Bertrand, Véronique Le Flaguais, Anne-Élisabeth Bossé		
Coppers	Alan Zweig			
The Cuban	Sergio Navarretta	Louis Gossett Jr., Ana Golja, Shohreh Aghdashloo, Lauren Holly		
Danny	Aaron Zeghers, Lewis Bennett	Danny Ryder		
Daughter	Anthony Shim	John Cassini, Gabrielle Rose, Camille Sullivan		
David Foster: Off the Record	Barry Avrich			
Delphine	Chloé Robichaud			
The Depths (Les profondeurs)	Ariane Louis-Seize			
Disappearance at Clifton Hill	Albert Shin	Tuppence Middleton, Hannah Gross		
Disruptor Conductor	Sharon Lewis	Daniel Bartholomew-Poyser, Thorgy Thor		
Docking	Trevor Anderson			
Don't Worry, the Doors Will Open	Oksana Karpovych			
Drag Kids	Megan Wennberg			
Dreamland	Bruce McDonald	Stephen McHattie, Juliette Lewis, Henry Rollins, Tómas Lemarquis		
Dumbo	Tim Burton	Colin Farrell, Michael Keaton, Danny DeVito, Eva Green, Alan Arkin	Co-production with the UK, Australia and the US	
Easy Land	Sanja Živković			
Fabulous (Fabuleuses)	Mélanie Charbonneau	Noémie O'Farrell, Juliette Gosselin, Mounia Zahzam		
A Fire in the Cold Season	Justin Oakey	Stephen Oates, Michaela Kurimsky		
Flood	Joseph Amenta			
The Forbidden Reel	Ariel Nasr			
Forgotten Flowers (Les fleurs oubliées)	André Forcier	Roy Dupuis, Yves Jacques, Émile Schneider, Juliette Gosselin, Christine Beaulieu		
From the Vine	Sean Cisterna	Joe Pantoliano, Wendy Crewson		
Ghost Town Anthology (Répertoire des villes disparues)	Denis Côté	Robert Naylor, Jocelyne Zucco, Diane Lavallée		
Giant Bear (ᓇᓄᕐᓗᒃ)	Daniel Paige, Neil Christopher, Daniel Gies	Solomon Awa, Beatrice Deer		
God's Nightmares	Daniel Cockburn			
Goodbye Golovin	Mathieu Grimard	Oleksandr Rudynskyy, Darya Plakhtiy, Maria Stopnyk		
Gordon Lightfoot: If You Could Read My Mind	Martha Kehoe, Joan Tosoni	Gordon Lightfoot		
The Great Malaise (Le Mal du siècle)	Catherine Lepage			
The Greatest Country in the World (Le Meilleur pays du monde)	Ky Nam Le Duc	Nguyen Thanh Tri, Mickaël Gouin, Schelby Jean-Baptiste		
Gun Killers	Jason Young			
Guest of Honour	Atom Egoyan	David Thewlis, Luke Wilson, Rossif Sutherland		
Hammer	Christian Sparkes	Will Patton, Mark O'Brien, Ben Cotton, Connor Price		
Harpoon	Rob Grant	Munro Chambers, Emily Tyra, Christopher Gray		
Havana, from on High (Sur les toits Havane)	Pedro Ruiz			
Head First (Tenir tête)	Mathieu Arsenault	Mathieu Arsenault, Frédérique Ménard-Aubin, Louis Parizeau		
Heart Bomb (Une bombe au cœur)	Rémi St-Michel	Alexis Lefebvre		
Highway to Heaven	Sandra Ignagni			
Homeport (Port d'attache)	Laurence Lévesque			
Hot Flash	Thea Hollatz			
Hrvoji, Look at You from the Tower	Ryan Ferko			
I Am in the World as Free and Slender as a Deer on a Plain	Sofia Banzhaf	Micaela Robertson		
I'll End Up in Jail (Je finirai en prison)	Alexandre Dostie	Martine Francke, Émile Schneider		
I'm Going to Break Your Heart	Annie Bradley, Jim Morrison	Raine Maida, Chantal Kreviazuk		
The Incredible 25th Year of Mitzi Bearclaw	Shelley Niro			
It Must Be Heaven	Elia Suleiman		International co-production	
It's Nothing	Anna Maguire			
James vs. His Future Self	Jeremy Lalonde	Jonas Chernick, Daniel Stern, Cleopatra Coleman, Tommie-Amber Pirie, Frances Conroy		
Jarvik	Émilie Mannering			
Jordan River Anderson, the Messenger	Alanis Obomsawin			
Jouliks	Mariloup Wolfe	Victor Andrés Trelles Turgeon, Jeanne Roux-Côté, Lilou Roy-Lanouette		
Just Me and You (Juste moi et toi)	Sandrine Brodeur-Desrosiers			
A Kandahar Away	Aisha Jamal			
Kenbe la, Until We Win (Kenbe la, jusqu’à la victoire)	Will Prosper			
Killing Patient Zero	Laurie Lynd	Gaëtan Dugas		
Kinship	Jorge Camarotti	Rabah Aït Ouyahia, Ryan Nikirad		
Kuessipan	Myriam Verreault		Adaptation of the novel by Naomi Fontaine	
L.A. Tea Time	Sophie Bédard Marcotte	Sophie Bédard Marcotte, Isabelle Stachtchenko		
The Last Nataq (Le dernier Nataq)	Lisette Marcotte	Richard Desjardins		
The Last Porno Show	Kire Paputts			
Lie Exposed	Jerry Ciccoritti	Leslie Hope, Jeff Kober, Bruce Greenwood		
Life Support	Renuka Jeyapalan			
Living 100 MPH (Vivre à 100 milles à l'heure)	Louis Bélanger			
Mad Dog and the Butcher (Les Derniers vilains)	Thomas Rinfret	Maurice "Mad Dog" Vachon, Paul "Butcher" Vachon		
Mafia Inc.	Daniel Grou	Marc-André Grondin, Mylène Mackay, Benz Antoine		
The Marijuana Conspiracy	Craig Pryce	Brittany Bristow, Morgan Kohan, Julia Sarah Stone. Tymika Tafari		
Matthias & Maxime	Xavier Dolan	Xavier Dolan, Gabriel D'Almeida Freitas, Pier-Luc Funk		
Measure	Karen Chapman			
Mon ami Walid	Adib Alkhalidey	Adib Alkhalidey, Julien Lacroix, Guy Jodoin		
Mont Foster	Louis Godbout	Patrick Hivon, Laurence Leboeuf, Lucie Laurier, Émile Proulx-Cloutier, Laurent Lucas		
Mr. Jane and Finch	Ngardy Conteh George	Winston LaRose		
MS Slavic 7	Sofia Bohdanowicz, Deragh Campbell	Deragh Campbell		
Murmur	Heather Young			
Mutts (Clebs)	Halima Ouardiri			
My Skin, Luminous	Gabino Rodríguez, Nicolás Pereda			
Nahanni: River of Forgiveness	Geoff Bowie			
nîpawistamâsowin: We Will Stand Up	Tasha Hubbard			
No Crying at the Dinner Table	Carol Nguyen			
Now Is the Time	Christopher Auchter	Robert Davidson		
Once Were Brothers: Robbie Robertson and The Band	Daniel Roher	The Band		
One Day in the Life of Noah Piugattuk	Zacharias Kunuk			
Oracle	Aaron Poole			
Our Dance of Revolution	Phillip Pike	Angela Robertson, Rinaldo Walcott		
The Physics of Sorrow	Theodore Ushev			
Pick	Alicia K. Harris	Hazel Downey, Deragh Campbell		
Pinch	Diego Maclean			
Please Speak Continuously and Describe Your Experiences as They Come to You	Brandon Cronenberg	Deragh Campbell, Neil Bennett		
Pompei	Anna Falguères, John Shank	Aliocha Schneider, Garance Marillier, Vincent Rottiers		
Prey	Matt Gallagher	Rod McLeod		
The Prince of Val-Bé (Le Prince de Val-Bé)	Jean-François Leblanc	Éric Robidoux, Irlande Côté, Joanie Guérin		
The Procession (Le Cortège)	Pascal Blanchet, Rodolphe Saint-Gelais			
Propaganda: The Art of Selling Lies	Larry Weinstein			
Queen of the Morning Calm	Gloria Ui Young Kim	Tina Jung, Eponine Lee, Jesse LaVercombe, Shaun Benson		
Queering the Script	Gabrielle Zilkha			
Raf	Harry Cepka	Grace Glowicki, Jesse Stanley		
Random Acts of Violence	Jay Baruchel	Jesse Williams, Jordana Brewster, Niamh Wilson, Jay Baruchel	Canada/United States co-production	
Rebel (Recrue)	Pier-Philippe Chevigny			
Red Snow	Marie Clements	Asivak Koostachin, Samuel Marty, Tarun Keram, Tantoo Cardinal		
The Rest of Us	Aisling Chin-Yee	Heather Graham, Jodi Balfour, Sophie Nélisse		
Restless River (La rivière sans repos)	Marie-Hélène Cousineau, Madeline Ivalu	Malaya Qaunirq Chapman, Magalie Lépine-Blondeau, Patrick Hivon		
Riot Girls	Jovanka Vuckovic	Paloma Kwiatkowski, Madison Iseman, Munro Chambers		
The Rise of Jordan Peterson	Patricia Marcoccia	Jordan Peterson		
The River You Step In	Jon Michaelson	Astrid Van Wieren, Sharmila Dey		
Run This Town	Ricky Tollman	Damian Lewis, Ben Platt, Nina Dobrev, Scott Speedman		
Rustic Oracle	Sonia Boileau	Carmen Moore, Lake Delisle		
Second Generation	Miryam Charles			
The Secret Marathon	Scott Townend, Kate McKenzie			
The Seven Last Words (Les sept dernières paroles)	Kaveh Nabatian, Juan Andrés Arango, Sophie Deraspe, Karl Lemieux, Ariane Lorrain, Sophie Goyette, Caroline Monnet			
Shannon Amen	Chris Dainty			
Sisterhood (Ainsi soient-elles)	Maxime Faure			
The Song of Names	François Girard	Tim Roth, Clive Owen		
Spinster	Andrea Dorfman	Chelsea Peretti, Jonathan Watton, Susan Kent		
Spiral	Kurtis David Harder	Jeffrey Bowyer-Chapman, Ari Cohen		
Stand!	Robert Adetuyi	Marshall Williams, Laura Slade Wiggins		
Standing on the Line	Paul-Émile d'Entremont	David Testo, Anastasia Bucsis, Brock McGillis	Documentary on LGBT people in sports	
Sweetness in the Belly	Zeresenay Berhane Mehari	Dakota Fanning, Wunmi Mosaku, Kunal Nayyar	Adaptation of the novel by Camilla Gibb	
Sympathy for the Devil (Sympathie pour le diable)	Guillaume de Fontenay	Niels Schneider, Vincent Rottiers, Ella Rumpf		
Take Me to Prom	Andrew Moir			
Tammy's Always Dying	Amy Jo Johnson	Felicity Huffman, Anastasia Phillips		
Thanks for Everything (Merci pour tout)	Louise Archambault	Julie Perreault, Magalie Lépine-Blondeau		
There Are No Fakes	Jamie Kastner	Kevin Hearn		
There's Something in the Water	Elliot Page, (Note: Credited as Ellen Page) Ian Daniel			
Things I Do for Money	Warren P. Sonoda	Theodor Aoki, Maximilian Aoki	Crime drama	
This Ink Runs Deep	Asia Youngman			
This Is Not a Movie	Yung Chang			
Throat Singing in Kangirsuk (Katatjatuuk Kangirsumi)	Eva Kaukai and Manon Chamberland			
Tito	Grace Glowicki	Grace Glowicki, Ben Petrie		
The Twentieth Century	Matthew Rankin	Dan Beirne, Catherine St-Laurent, Louis Negin, Brent Skagford		
Uncle Thomas: Accounting for the Days	Regina Pessoa			
Village of the Missing	Michael Del Monte			
Volcano	Karen Moore	Hannah Cheesman, Jess Salgueiro		
A Way of Life (Une manière de vivre)	Micheline Lanctôt	Gabrielle Lazure, Rose-Marie Perreault, Laurent Lucas		
We Are Gold (Nous sommes Gold)	Éric Morin	Emmanuel Schwartz, Vincent Bilodeau, Monia Chokri, Patrick Hivon		
We Had It Coming	Paul Barbeau	Natalie Krill, Erin Agostino, Alexia Fast, Nabil Khatib		
White Lie	Calvin Thomas and Yonah Lewis	Kacey Rohl, Amber Anderson, Martin Donovan, Connor Jessup		
Wilcox	Denis Côté	Guillaume Tremblay		
Willie	Laurence Mathieu-Léger	Willie O'Ree		
Wintopia	Mira Burt-Wintonick			
A Woman, My Mother (Une femme, ma mère)	Claude Demers			
Workhorse	Cliff Caines			
The World Is Bright	Ying Wang			
Young Juliette (Jeune Juliette)	Anne Émond	Alexane Jamieson, Léanne Désilets, Antoine Desrochers		
Zoo	Will Niava			

== See also ==
- 2019 in Canada
- 2019 in Canadian television
