= Alexandre Auger =

Canadian screenwriter

Alexandre Auger is a Canadian screenwriter from Quebec. He is most noted as a dual Canadian Screen Award nominee for Best Original Screenplay at the 14th Canadian Screen Awards in 2026 as co-writer with Éric K. Boulianne of Follies (Folichonneries) and with Mathieu Denis of The Cost of Heaven (Gagne ton ciel).

== Filmography ==
- La Trappe - 2010
- Gaspé Copper - 2013
- Pas la grosse Sophie - 2014
- Yo - 2015, with Matías Meyer
- Prank - 2016, with Éric K. Boulianne, Marc-Antoine Rioux, Vincent Biron
- Heart Bomb (Une bombe au cœur) - 2019, with Éric K. Boulianne, Marc-Antoine Rioux, Rémi St-Michel
- Barbarians of the Bay (Les Barbares de La Malbaie) - 2019, with Éric K. Boulianne, Marc-Antoine Rioux
- Landgraves - 2020
- Bungalow - 2022, with Lawrence Côté-Collins
- Follies (Folichonneries) - 2025, with Éric K. Boulianne
- The Cost of Heaven (Gagne ton ciel) - 2025, with Mathieu Denis
