= Emmanuelle Lussier-Martinez =

Canadian actress

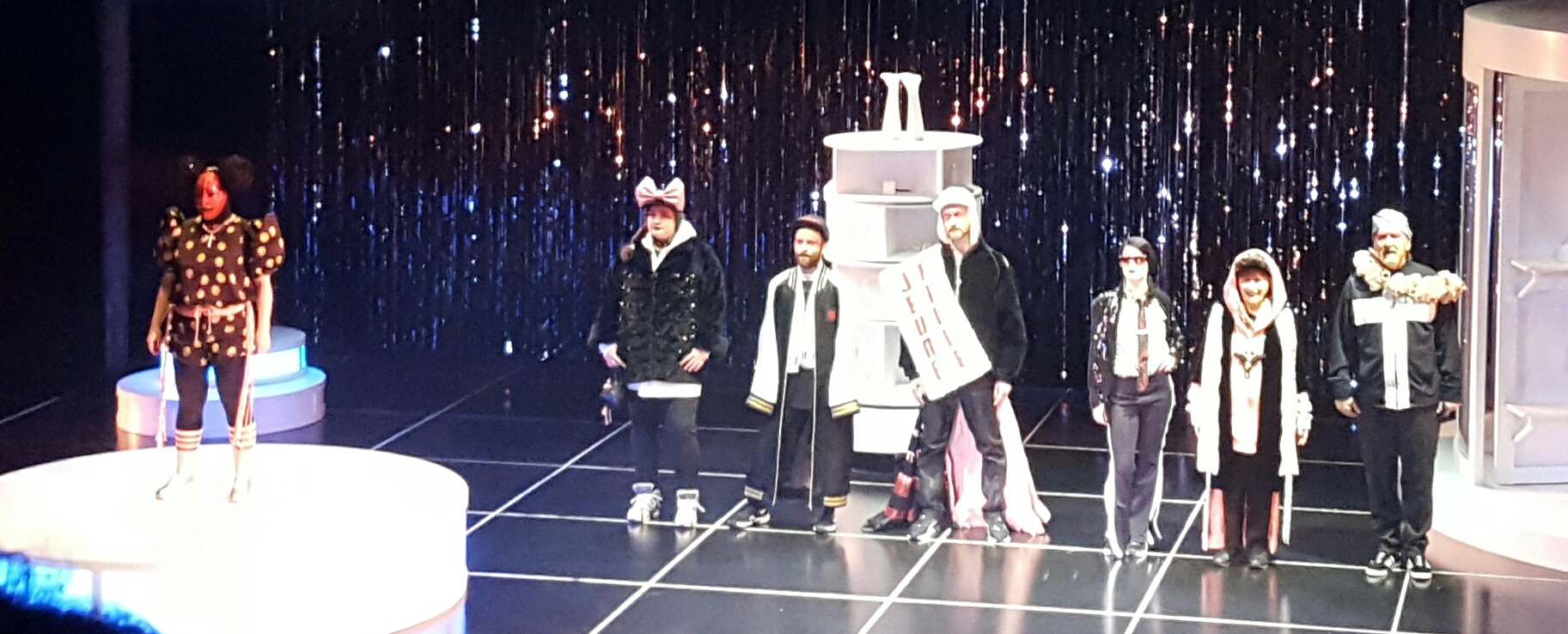
- Emmanuelle Lussier-Martinez performing in Manifeste de la jeune fille in Montreal.
- Born: Ottawa, Ontario
- Education: University of Ottawa
- Occupation: Actress

Emmanuelle Lussier-Martinez is a Canadian actress who has worked in both film and television. She was born in Ottawa, Ontario, to a Chilean Canadian mother and a French Canadian father, and attended the University of Ottawa.

== Career ==
Lussier-Martinez acted in the TV series 19-2, before she had her first film role in director Louis Bélanger's Bad Seeds (2016). For the 2016 film Those Who Make Revolution Halfway Only Dig Their Own Graves, directors Mathieu Denis and Simon Lavoie sought a youthful cast, securing Lussier-Martinez for a lead role. She also performed in the Conservatoire de Montréal in 2013.

In April 2017, Lussier-Martinez received two Prix Iris nominations, namely Best Actress for Those Who Make Revolution Halfway Only Dig Their Own Graves for her role of Ordine Nuovo and Best Supporting Actress for Bad Seeds.

In 2021, Emmanuelle voiced Mantis in the video game Marvel's Guardians of the Galaxy.
