= Making Babies (2023 film) =

2023 Canadian short film directed by Eric K. Boulianne

- French: Faire un enfant
- Directed by: Eric K. Boulianne
- Written by: Eric K. Boulianne
- Produced by: Jean-Sébastien Beaudoin Gagnon; Johannie Deschambault
- Starring: Eric K. Boulianne; Florence Blain Mbaye; Rémi St-Michel
- Cinematography: François Messier-Rheault
- Edited by: Myriam Magassouba
- Music by: Peter Venne
- Production company: Chez Sport
- Release date: August 6, 2023 (Locarno)
- Running time: 19 minutes
- Country: Canada
- Language: French

Making Babies (French: Faire un enfant) is a Canadian short comedy-drama film, directed by Eric K. Boulianne and released in 2023. The film stars Boulianne and Florence Blain Mbaye as a couple who aspire to have their first child together but are facing fertility difficulties.

The cast also includes Rémi St-Michel as the doctor, as well as Jérémie Desbiens and Andrée-Anne Lacasse in small roles as another couple.

== Distribution ==
The film premiered on August 6, 2023, at the 76th Locarno Film Festival, and had its Canadian premiere on September 8 at the 2023 Toronto International Film Festival.

== Response ==
The film was named to TIFF's annual Canada's Top Ten list for 2023.

== Awards ==
At Locarno, Boulianne won the Pardi di domani award for best direction in a short film.

At the 2023 Abitibi-Témiscamingue International Film Festival, it won the Prix Crave for most popular short film in the festival program.

Boulianne and Mbaye both received Canadian Screen Award nominations for Best Performance in a Live Action Short Drama at the 12th Canadian Screen Awards in 2024.

The film received a Prix Iris nomination for Best Live Action Short Film at the 26th Quebec Cinema Awards in 2024.
