= Florence Blain Mbaye =

- Born: 1986 (age 39–40)
- Occupations: Actress, voice actress, oboist, singer, music producer and director, sound designer
- Years active: 2004–present
- Awards: Canadian Screen Award nominations, Gala Dynastie Actrice de l'année

Florence Blain Mbaye (born 1986), sometimes credited as Florence Blain, is a Senegalese-Canadian actress, voice actress, oboist, singer, music producer and director, and sound designer based in Montreal. She has performed on both national and international stages across film, television, theatre, music, and multimedia projects.

== Early life and education ==
Blain Mbaye studied oboe and chamber music at the Montreal Conservatory of Music, as well as theatre acting and dubbing at the Montreal Conservatory of Dramatic Art.

== Career ==
She has appeared in films including Waiting for April (En attendant avril), There Are No False Undertakings (Il n'y a pas de faux métier), Bungalow, This House (Cette maison), Invincible, Ireland Blue Book (Irlande cahier bleu), Making Babies (Faire un enfant), and the upcoming film Follies (autumn 2025) by Eric K. Boulianne. Her television credits include Bellefleur, Dumas, and L'œil du cyclone. She has also appeared in numerous theatre productions, including Cabaret Noir, Civilization and Its Discontents, Selle de nouvelles, and Sappho. She also performs dub and voiceover work.

Blain Mbaye has performed as a professional ensemble oboist since 2008. She has appeared on several albums and has released multiple albums of her own. As a musician, she has collaborated with the UBS Verbier Festival Orchestra, Orquesta y Coro Nacionales de España, Les Violons du Roy, Orchestre Métropolitain, Philippe B, and Avec pas d'casque. In 2023, she released her album Les lignes de désir, and in 2024, she released the EP Cabaret Noir, which she produced and directed.

== Awards and recognition ==
- 2004 – Étoile Galaxie, 1st prize (category 17 and under), Music Competition of Canada
- 2004 – Winner, Montreal Youth Symphony Orchestra concerto competition
- 2004 – Recipient, Grant Sandra Wilson
- 2006 – Golden Category, Mozart Competition of Sinfonia de Lanaudière
- 2006 – Winner, Competition Young Artists of Radio-Canada
- 2006 – Recipient, Grant McAbby, Montreal Conservatory
- 2014 – Canadian Screen Award nomination for Best Supporting Actress, Another House
- 2024 – Canadian Screen Award nomination for Best Performance in a Live Action Short Drama, Making Babies
- 2024 – Actress of the Year (Cinema/Television), Gala Dynastie

== Filmography ==
=== Film ===
Year	Title	Role	Notes
2012	Another House (L'autre maison)	Maïa	Canadian Screen Award nomination for Best Supporting Actress
2017	La Voyante	Actrice	Short film
2018	Waiting for April (En attendant Avril)	La Renarde	
2020	There Are No False Undertakings (Il n'y a pas de faux métier)	La Renarde	
2020	The Sticky Side of Baklava (La face cachée du baklava)	Museum guide	
2021	This House (Cette Maison)	Valeska	
2021	Archipelago (Archipel)	Narrator	
2022	Bungalow	Lilou	
2022	Invincible	Sonia	Short film
2023	Making Babies (Faire un enfant)	Elle	Canadian Screen Award nomination for Best Performance in a Live Action Short Drama
2023	Ireland Blue Book (Irlande cahier bleu)	Charming Louise	
2024	Vile & Miserable (Vil & Misérable)	Agent Marion	
2024	You Are Not Alone (Vous n'êtes pas seuls)	Police officer	
2025	Follies (Folichonneries)		

=== Television ===
Year	Title	Role	Notes
2022–2022	L'œil du cyclone	Julie	Agence RBL
2024	Bellefleur	Mia	Agence RBL
2024	Dumas	Mylène	Agence RBL

=== Theatre ===
Year	Production	Role	Director	Notes
2022	Mythe	Florence	Mykalle Bielinski	La Serre – Arts vivants [Agence RBL]
2022	Sappho	Ariane	Marie-Ève Milot	Théâtre de Quat'sous [Agence RBL]
2019–2020	Soifs matériaux	Vénus	Denis Marleau	Ubus Théâtre [Agence RBL]
2021–2025	Cabaret Noir	Florence	Mélanie Demers	Mayday Danse [Agence RBL]

=== Music / Discography ===
Year	Album / EP	Role / Notes
2024	Cabaret Noir (EP)	Producer, director, composer, performer [Agence RBL]
2023	Les lignes de désir	Co-producer, co-director, composer, performer [Agence RBL]
2020–2021	Dans mon salon	Co-producer, co-director, composer, performer [Agence RBL]

=== Dubbing (selected) ===
Year	Project	Role	Notes
2021	Dune	Shadout Mapes	Cinélume [Agence RBL]
2021	Cruella	Anita Darling	Difuze Inc [Agence RBL]
2022	Sonic the Hedgehog 2	Maddie	Cinélume [Agence RBL]
2023	The Color Purple	Sofia	Difuze Inc [Agence RBL]
2024	The Fire Inside	Jackie	Cinélume [Agence RBL]
