= Those Who Make Revolution Halfway Only Dig Their Own Graves =

2016 film by Mathieu Denis

- Film poster
- French: Ceux qui font les révolutions à moitié n'ont fait que se creuser un tombeau
- Directed by: Mathieu Denis; Simon Lavoie
- Produced by: Hany Ouichou
- Starring: Charlotte Aubin; Laurent Bélanger; Emmanuelle Lussier-Martinez; Gabrielle Tremblay
- Cinematography: Nicolas Canniccioni
- Edited by: Mathieu Denis
- Production companies: Art&Essai
- Distributed by: K-Films Amérique
- Release date: September 13, 2016 (Toronto)
- Running time: 184 minutes
- Country: Canada
- Language: French

Those Who Make Revolution Halfway Only Dig Their Own Graves (French: Ceux qui font les révolutions à moitié n'ont fait que se creuser un tombeau) is a 2016 Canadian drama film directed by Mathieu Denis and Simon Lavoie. It stars Charlotte Aubin, Laurent Bélanger, Emmanuelle Lussier-Martinez and Gabrielle Tremblay as four young people, veterans of the 2012 Quebec student protests, who have been disillusioned by the failure of their past activism to effect meaningful social change and now engage in small-scale public vandalism.

The film competed in the Platform program at the 2016 Toronto International Film Festival, where it won for Best Canadian Film. It was also nominated for three Canadian Screen Awards, including Best Motion Picture.

== Cast ==
- Charlotte Aubin as Giutizia
- Laurent Bélanger as Tumulto
- Emmanuelle Lussier-Martinez as Ordine Nuovo
- Gabrielle Tremblay as Klas Batalo

== Production ==
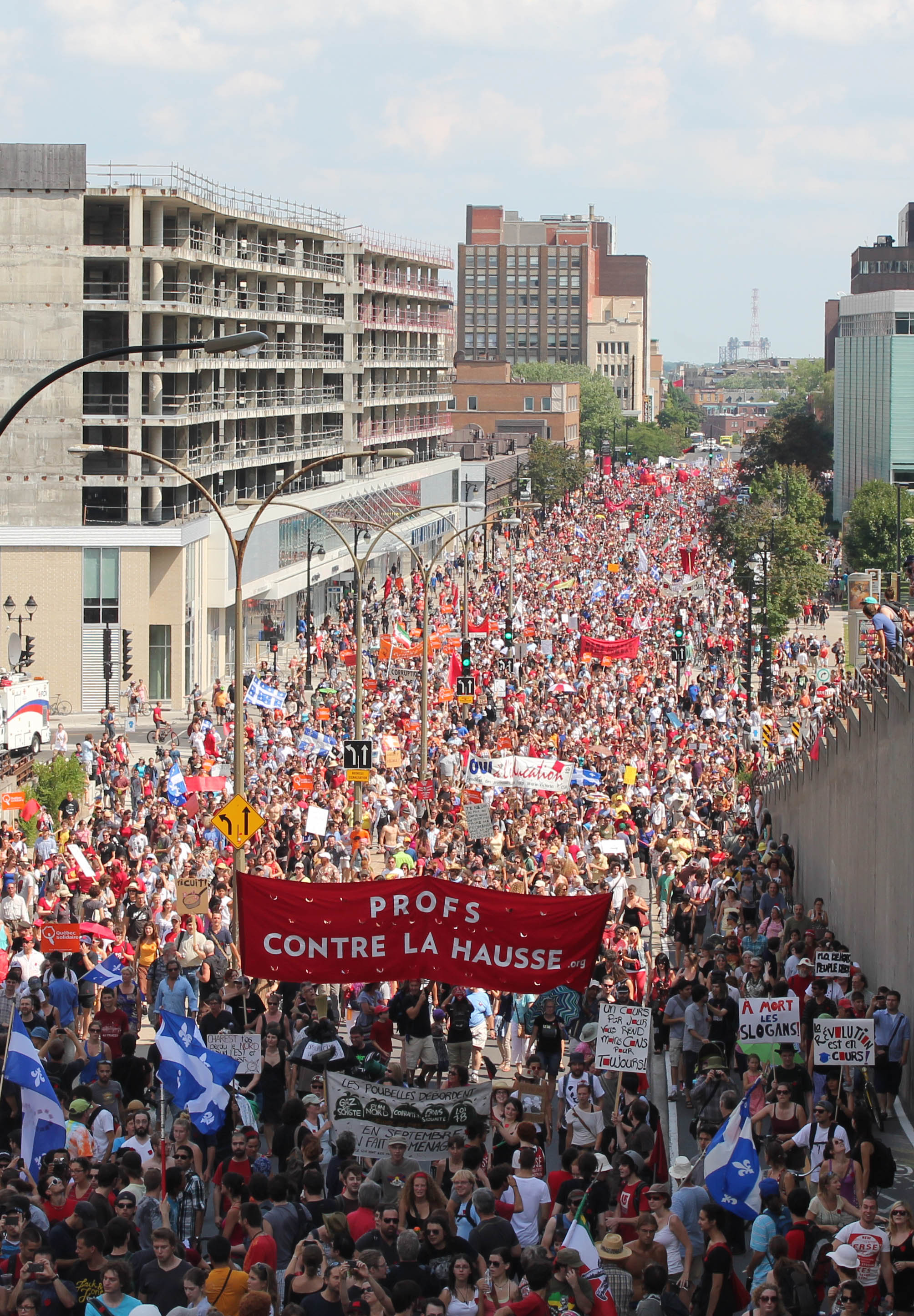
The 2012 Quebec student protests in Montreal inspired the film.

The film was conceived by co-directors Mathieu Denis and Simon Lavoie, inspired by the 2012 Quebec student protests. The directors claimed they spoke with students during the protests while showing their film Laurentia (Laurentie). Denis and Lavoie said they often wondered what happened to these students in later years. Denis stated his conviction that the protests were important but unsuccessful, noting the Quebec Liberal Party, which governed in 2012, was back in government after the 2014 Quebec general election.

While showing Laurentia in Saint Petersburg, Russia, Denis and Lavoie considered partnering on another project. Lavoie was particularly influenced by mug shots of four young people who placed smoke bombs on the Montreal Metro during the protests. The title was a phrase used by Louis Antoine de Saint-Just, a leader of the French Revolution, and was initially intended as a working title.

For the film, the directors sought a youthful cast, securing Aubin, Lussier-Martinez, Bélanger and Tremblay. Lussier-Martinez had previously acted in the TV series 19-2. Aubin stated the screenplay attracted her for how the characters symbolized larger ideas. For the transgender character of Klas Batalo, Denis and Lavoie searched for a real-life transgender performer, and found Tremblay, a trans woman. Tremblay said she idolized the protest for creating a social movement, and drew on personal experiences to portray her character. Production was continuing through January 2016, and Denis estimated the last of the editing would occur in the spring or summer of 2016.

== Release ==
The film screened at the Toronto International Film Festival in September 2016, and has been selected for the 67th Berlin International Film Festival. A wider release was planned for the spring of 2017. The Quebec release was later scheduled for 3 February.

The film was included in the travelling Top Ten Film Festival, screened in Toronto from 13 to 26 January 2017. Plans were made for screenings in Vancouver, Montreal and Edmonton between 13 January and 29 January 2017.

== Reception ==
=== Critical reception ===
On 7 December 2016, it was named to TIFF's annual Canada's Top 10 list. In La Presse, Nathalie Petrowski wrote the film was unusual, amazing and occasionally shocking, and was long but not dull at any time. Odile Tremblay, writing for Le Devoir, called the film poetic, and said the film received applause at TIFF but was also divisive. Martin Gignac called the film dense and unrestrained, with great cinematography.

Outside Canada, Scott Tobias, writing for Variety, called it "a tense, mournful, and profoundly ambivalent portrait of radicalism". Adam Cook of The New York Times called it "unapologetically abrasive and politically charged".

=== Accolades ===
For producing the film, Hany Ouichou received the Canadian Media Producers Association's Emerging Producer Award, a $5,000 prize conferred by a jury headed by Robert Lantos. Tremblay became the first trans woman nominated for the Canadian Screen Award for Best Supporting Actress.

Award	Date of ceremony	Category	Recipient(s)	Result	Ref(s)
Buenos Aires International Festival of Independent Cinema	19 – 30 April 2017	Grand Prize - Avant-Garde and Genre	Mathieu Denis and Simon Lavoie	Won	
Canadian Screen Awards	12 March 2017	Best Motion Picture	Hany Ouichou	Nominated	
Canadian Screen Awards	12 March 2017	Best Director	Mathieu Denis and Simon Lavoie	Nominated	
Canadian Screen Awards	12 March 2017	Best Supporting Actress	Gabrielle Tremblay	Nominated	
Prix Iris	4 June 2017	Best Film	Hany Ouichou	Nominated	
Prix Iris	4 June 2017	Best Actress	Emmanuelle Lussier-Martinez	Nominated	
Prix Iris	4 June 2017	Best Art Direction	Éric Barbeau	Won	
Prix Iris	4 June 2017	Best Editing	Mathieu Denis	Nominated	
Toronto International Film Festival	8–18 September 2016	Best Canadian Film	Hany Ouichou	Won	
