= Gaspé Copper =

2013 Canadian short film

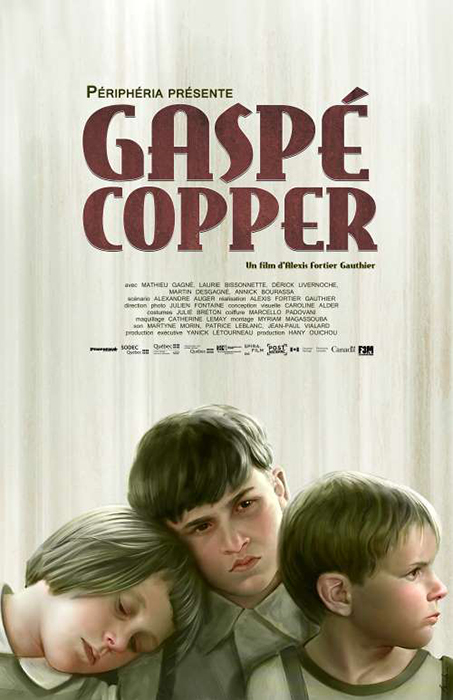
- Directed by: Alexis Fortier Gauthier
- Written by: Alexandre Auger
- Produced by: Hany Ouichou
- Starring: Laurie Bissonnette; Annick Bourassa; Martin Desgagné; Mathieu Gagné; Dérick Livernoche
- Cinematography: Julien Fontaine
- Edited by: Myriam Magassouba
- Production company: Peripheria Productions
- Distributed by: Les Films du 3 mars
- Release date: March 23, 2013 (RVCQ)
- Running time: 14 minutes
- Country: Canada
- Language: French

Gaspé Copper is a Canadian short drama film, directed by Alexis Fortier Gauthier and released in 2013. The film centres on a family living in the small town of Murdochville, Quebec in the 1950s, who are preparing to move to a bigger city so that the father can get a new job after being thrown out of work by the Murdochville strike.

The cast includes Laurie Bissonnette, Annick Bourassa, Martin Desgagné, Mathieu Gagné and Dérick Livernoche.

The film premiered on March 3, 2013, at the Rendez-vous du cinéma québécois.

The film was a Prix Jutra nominee for Best Short Film at the 16th Jutra Awards in 2014.
