= Just Me and You =

Just Me and You may refer to:

- Just Me and You (1978 film)
- Just Me and You (2019 film)
