= Stéphane Crête =

Canadian actor

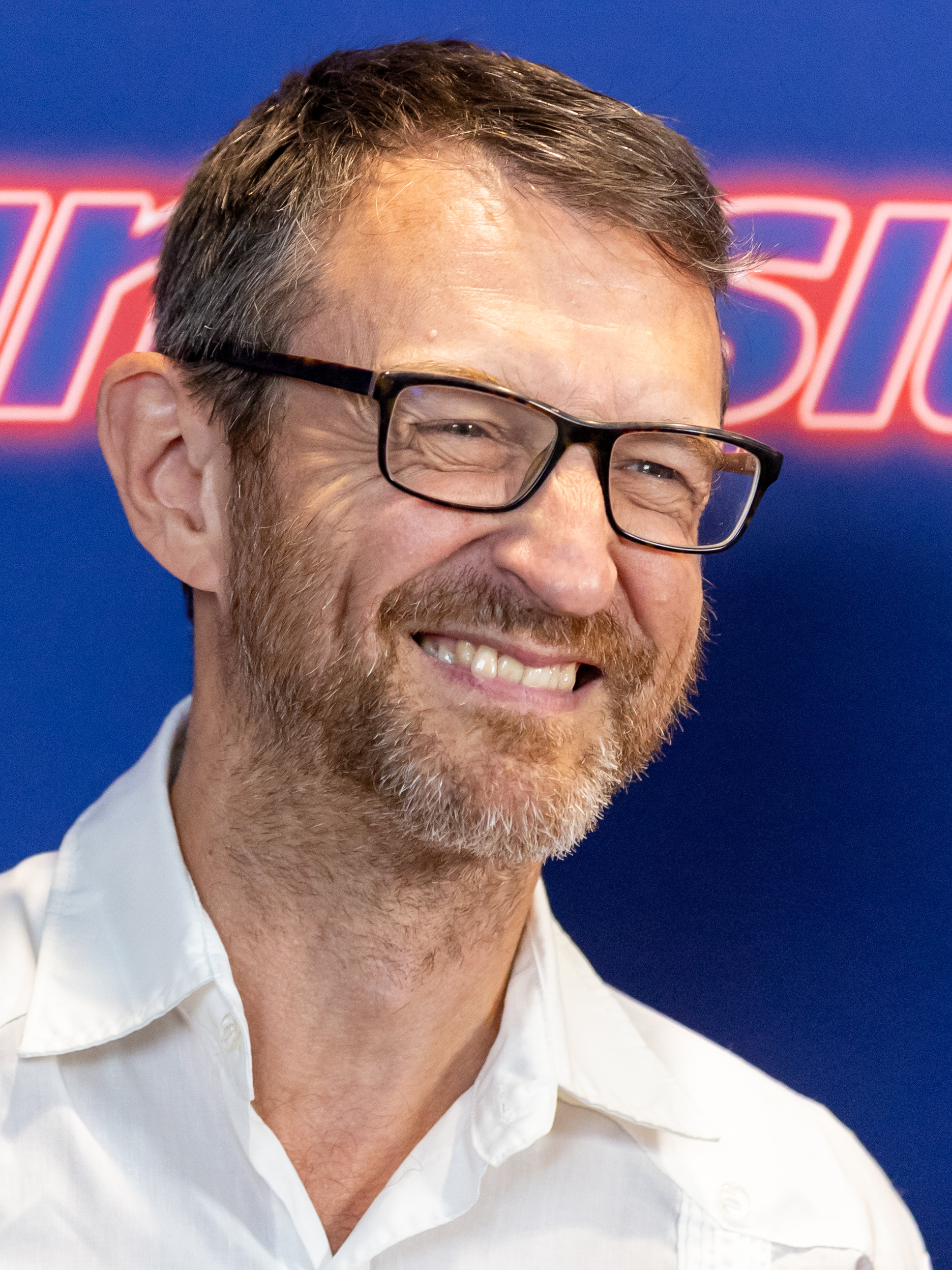
Stéphane Crête in 2024

Stéphane Crête (September 19, 1967) is a Canadian actor and comedian from Quebec. He is known for his roles as Brad Spitfire in the Le Canal Famille television show Dans une galaxie près de chez-vous and Jacques Préfontaine on the Télévision de Radio-Canada miniseries Les Étoiles filantes.

In 2002, he won a Gémeaux Award for his work in Dans une galaxie près de chez-vous.

== Filmography ==
=== Film ===
Year	Title	Role	Notes
1995	Zigrail	Agent de stationnement	
1996	Cosmos	Antoine	
2000	The Left-Hand Side of the Fridge (La moitié gauche du frigo)	Collègue de théâtre	
2000	Inséparables	Alexandre	
2000	The Bottle (La Bouteille)	Stéphane	
2004	Dans une galaxie près de chez vous	Brad Spitfire	
2008	Dans une galaxie près de chez vous 2	Brad Spitfire	
2010	A Life Begins (Une vie commence)	Directeur salon funéraire	
2015	Endorphine	Père de Simone	
2016	Un paradis pour tous	Buster Simard	
2016	Kiss Me Like a Lover (Embrasse-moi comme tu m'aimes)	Monsieur Rivest	
2017	Infiltration (Le problème d'infiltration)	Directeur	Voice
2018	For Those Who Don't Read Me (À tous ceux qui ne me lisent pas)	Claude	
2019	Young Juliette (Jeune Juliette)	M. Bernier	
2019	Mafia Inc.	Gilles	
2020	Flashwood	Homme du quartier	
2020	There Are No False Undertakings (Il n'y a pas de faux métier)	Concierge père	
2021	Brain Freeze	Michel	
2023	Ireland Blue Book (Irlande cahier bleu)	Coach	
TBA	Aux âmes Patriotes	Dr. James Perrigo	

=== Television ===
Year	Title	Role	Notes
1994	4 et demi...	Animateur de télé	2 episodes
1998	Km/h	Nino	Episode: "C'est beau un homme"
1998	Bouledogue Bazar	L'homme-statue	Episode: "Le biathlon de Ferdinand"
1998–2023	Un gars, une fille	Various roles	5 episodes
1999–2001	Dans une galaxie près de chez vous	Brad Spitfire	62 episodes
2001	Fortier	Assistant légiste	Episode: "Un petit lapin qui dit tout (2/3)"
2004–2007	Ramdam	Richard Lagarde	16 episodes
2005	L'auberge du chien noir	Various roles	Episode: "L'arroseur arrosé"
2006	Et Dieu créa... Laflaque	Bobino	Episode: "Y'a t'il un pépére dans l'avion"
2009–2010	Tactik	Rick Vallières	40 episodes
2010	En audition avec Simon	Stéphane Crête	Episode: "Stéphane Crête"
2012	Trauma	Patrick Donovan	Episode: "Humains et machines"
2016	Legacy, a Kate McDougal Investigation	Claude Jolicoeur	6 episodes
2017	Béliveau	René Lecavalier	5 episodes
2021	Sans rendez-vous	Dr. Gagné	10 episodes
2022–2023	Famille Magique	Malire Binette	20 episodes
