= Toy Gun Bandit =

2026 Canadian crime drama film

- French: Faux gun bandit
- Directed by: Rémi St-Michel
- Written by: Rémi St-Michel
- Produced by: Jeanne-Marie Poulain; Anaëlle Béglet
- Starring: Félix Munger; David Beaudoin; Sara Montpetit; Lou Thompson
- Cinematography: Xavier Bossé
- Edited by: Rémi St-Michel
- Music by: Peter Venne
- Production company: Les Productions Spécimen
- Distributed by: h264 Distribution
- Release date: September 10, 2026 (TIFF)
- Running time: 102 minutes
- Country: Canada
- Language: French

Toy Gun Bandit (French: Faux Gun Bandit) is a Canadian action drama film, written and directed by Rémi St-Michel and released in 2026.

== Synopsis ==
After bragging about stealing from a convenience store, Félix is pulled in by his new friend Dave into a plan to rob a local bank. Hungry for recognition, he dives in without hesitation. But the thrill fades fast as things unravel, and the guns turn out to be all too real.

== Production ==
The film was shot in spring 2025, in Quebec City, Beauport and Lévis. It is St-Michel's second feature film overall, following Before We Explode (Avant qu'on explose) in 2019, but the first for which he was both the director and the screenwriter.

== Cast ==
- Félix Munger : Félix
- David Beaudoin : Dave
- Sara Montpetit : Sara
- Brandon Truong : Brandon
- Chau-Phi Van Quirion : Chau
- Jenny-Mark Turmel-Pichette : Jenny
- Lou Thompson : Lou

== Distribution ==
Faux Gun Bandit premiered in the Centrepiece program at the 2026 Toronto International Film Festival. The film is set to be released theatrically in Quebec in 2027. The distributor h264 is handling international sales for the film.

It had its Quebec premiere at the Quebec City Film Festival.

The film is set for theatrical release in Quebec in 2027.

== Critical response ==
For That Shelf, Rachel West wrote that "it is easy to see why Toy Gun Bandit is one of this year’s TIFF Next Wave Selects, a group of films highlighted by a group of teenage film enthusiasts. Félix’s incredulous teenage experience is filled with such universal truths that, beneath this wild premise, the film feels remarkably relatable. It’s the type of film that will have audiences championing the state of Canadian cinema as they exit the theatre, engaged and excited about the distinctive and spirited stories coming out of our home country, particularly in Quebec."

== Awards ==
The film was shortlisted for the Jean-Marc Vallée DGC Discovery Award at the Directors Guild of Canada awards in 2026.

The film is also slated to screen in the Borsos Competition program at the 2026 Whistler Film Festival.
