= Little Brother (2014 film) =

Canadian short comedy film

- French: Petit frère
- Directed by: Rémi St-Michel
- Written by: Eric K. Boulianne
- Produced by: Jean-Sébastien Beaudoin Gagnon; Rémi St-Michel; Eric K. Boulianne
- Starring: Étienne Galloy; Eric K. Boulianne
- Cinematography: François Messier-Rheault
- Edited by: Sophie B. Sylvestre
- Music by: Peter Venne
- Production companies: Klaus Kinky; Romance Polanski
- Distributed by: Traveling Distribution
- Release date: May 24, 2014 (Cannes)
- Running time: 14 minutes
- Country: Canada
- Language: French

Little Brother (French: Petit frère) is a Canadian short comedy film, directed by Rémi St-Michel and released in 2014. The film stars Étienne Galloy as Antoine, a troubled teenager who is spending the day having fun around the city with his Big Brother Julian (Eric K. Boulianne) before the latter's departure for Russia.

The film premiered at the 2014 Cannes Film Festival, in the Critics' Week stream. It later won the Audience Choice award for best short film at the 2014 Cinéfest Sudbury International Film Festival.

The film was a Canadian Screen Award nominee for Best Live Action Short Drama at the 3rd Canadian Screen Awards in 2015.

Galloy was also cast in St-Michel's 2019 feature film debut Before We Explode (Avant qu'on explose), which addressed some similar themes but was not intended as a literal sequel to Little Brother. In 2021 Saint-Michel released the short film Big Brother (Grand frère), in which Antoine and Julian reunited several years later after Julian's return from Russia, only to learn that their relationship with each other had changed.
