= The White Chapel (film) =

2005 Canadian short film

- French: Une chapelle blanche
- Directed by: Simon Lavoie
- Written by: Simon Lavoie
- Produced by: Pascal Bascaron; Sylvain Corbeil
- Starring: Hélène Loiselle
- Cinematography: John Ashmore
- Edited by: Mathieu Denis
- Production company: Metafilms
- Distributed by: Les Distributions Netima
- Release date: September 10, 2005 (TIFF)
- Running time: 39 minutes
- Country: Canada
- Language: French

The White Chapel (French: Une chapelle blanche) is a Canadian short drama film, directed by Simon Lavoie and released in 2005. The film stars Hélène Loiselle as Rose-Flore, an elderly woman living in a small town whose familiar routines are disrupted when the small white chapel across the street from her home is repainted blue.

The film premiered at the 2005 Toronto International Film Festival.

The film won the Jutra Award for Best Live Action Short Film at the 8th Jutra Awards in 2006.
