= Catherine Brunet =

Canadian actress

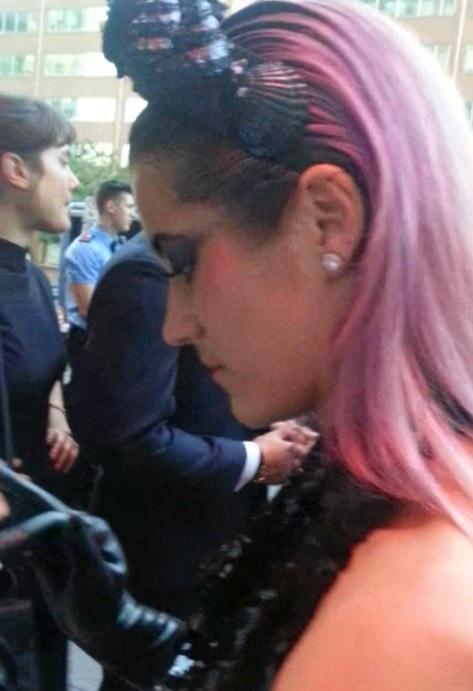
- Brunet at the 2016 Prix Gémeaux
- Born: October 30, 1990 (age 35); Terrebonne, Quebec, Canada
- Occupation: Actress
- Notable work: Le monde de Charlotte

Catherine Brunet (born 30 October 1990 in Terrebonne, Quebec) is a Canadian actress. Her breakout role was in the television series Le monde de Charlotte (1999–2006).

Aside from the title role in Le monde de Charlotte, her extensive list of lead roles includes Ramdam (2004–2008), Légitime dépense (2009–2011), and Marche à l'ombre (2015–2016). She played Catherine in Le Chalet (2015–2018).

Brunet does extensive dubbing for the French releases of films in Quebec. Her first major dubbing role was as the title character in Matilda and she has dubbed Miley Cyrus, Emilia Clarke, Jennifer Lawrence, Evanna Lynch (the Harry Potter film series), Ella Purnell (Miss Peregrine's Home for Peculiar Children), Daisy Ridley (Star Wars: The Force Awakens), Margot Robbie (Suicide Squad), and Emma Stone. She has expressed intent to continue to dub even as her on-screen career increases.

She is a spokesperson for GRIS Montréal (Groupe de Recherche et d'Intervention Sociale), a group that runs high school programs to educate and bring awareness about issues of sexual orientation and gender identity, a result of her active promotion of LGBT rights, including on social media. She is also a spokesperson for ANEB Québec, a group that offers programming related to eating disorders. In the media, she has talked about her body image, suggesting she was more comfortable in front of the camera than at school, where people would taunt her as "grosse" ("fat") and "naine" ("dwarf"). She was a spokesperson for UNICEF Quebec from 2000–2003, and ambassador from 2003–2008.

She has known director Xavier Dolan since age 12, working together on-screen and in dubbing, and was with him when he came out to his parents. She has appeared as an extra in his films Mommy and The Death and Life of John F. Donovan.

She is in a relationship with actor Antoine Pilon.
