= Where Souls Go =

2025 Canadian drama film

- French: Où vont les âmes?
- Directed by: Brigitte Poupart
- Written by: Brigitte Poupart
- Produced by: Étienne Hansez
- Starring: Sara Montpetit; Monia Chokri; Julianne Côté; Sylvie Testud
- Cinematography: Gontran Chartré
- Edited by: Justin Lachance
- Music by: Mathieu David Gagnon
- Production company: Bravo Charlie
- Distributed by: Axia Films
- Release date: September 10, 2025 (Cinemania)
- Running time: 121 minutes
- Country: Canada
- Language: French

Where Souls Go (French: Où vont les âmes?) is a Canadian drama film, directed by Brigitte Poupart and released in 2025. The film stars Sara Montpetit as Anna, a girl who has been diagnosed with incurable terminal cancer and has chosen to end her life via assisted suicide; her dying wish is to reconnect with her older half-sisters Ève (Monia Chokri) and Éléonore (Julianne Côté), from whom she has been estranged ever since their father (Jean Marchand) went to prison for committing sexual assault.

The cast also includes Sylvie Testud, Micheline Lanctôt, Fabiola Nyrva Aladin, Ambre Jabrane, and Dayam Rubiano in supporting roles.

== Production and release ==
The film, Poupart's narrative fiction filmmaking debut, was shot in fall 2024 in Quebec, including Montreal, Frelighsburg and Léry. The film premiered on November 10, 2025, at the Cinemania film festival, before opening commercially on November 14.
