= Agathe Ledoux =

Agathe Bellemare-Ledoux, generally credited in acting roles as Agathe Ledoux, is a Canadian child actress. She is most noted for her performances in the 2023 short film Heat Spell (L'Été des chaleurs), for which she received a Canadian Screen Award nomination for Best Performance in a Live Action Short Drama at the 12th Canadian Screen Awards in 2024, and the 2025 film Follies (Folichonneries), for which she was a CSA nominee for Best Supporting Performance in a Comedy Film at the 14th Canadian Screen Awards in 2026.

In 2026 she was announced as leading the cast of La symphonie du sens, the forthcoming feature film by Charlotte Le Bon.

She has also appeared in the films How to Get Your Parents to Divorce (Pas d'chicane dans ma cabane!), Coyote, Dusk for a Hitman (Crépuscule pour un tueur) and All Stirred Up! (Tous toqués), and the television series Happily Married (C'est comme ça que je t'aime), Doute raisonnable, Sweetheart (Chouchou) and Alertes.

Her younger sister Simone Ledoux is also an actress, who appeared with her in both Heat Spell and Follies.
