= Olivier Godin =

Olivier Godin is a Canadian film director and screenwriter from Quebec.

He directed a number of short films before premiering his full-length directoral debut, Le Pays des âmes, at the 2011 Festival du nouveau cinéma. He followed up in 2014 with Nouvelles, nouvelles, and in 2016 with The Art of Speech (Les Arts de la parole), for which he won a jury prize at the 2017 edition of Les Percéides.

In 2018 he released Waiting for April (En attendant avril), which was his first film to receive wide distribution beyond Quebec, including being selected for the 2018 Vancouver International Film Festival.

There Are No False Undertakings (Il n'y a pas de faux métier) premiered at the virtual 2020 edition of the Festival du nouveau cinéma.

His sixth film, Ireland Blue Book (Irlande cahier bleu), premiered at the 2023 Fantasia Film Festival, where it was the winner of the Camera Lucida award from the Association québécoise des critiques de cinéma.

Don't Forget the Oatmeal (Oublie pas le gruau) premiered at the 2026 Montreal Critics' Week.

== Filmography ==
- Le Pays des âmes - 2011
- Nouvelles, nouvelles - 2014
- The Art of Speech (Les Arts de la parole) - 2016
- Waiting for April (En attendant avril) - 2018
- There Are No False Undertakings (Il n'y a pas de faux métier) - 2020
- Ireland Blue Book (Irlande cahier bleu) - 2023
- Don't Forget the Oatmeal (Oublie pas le gruau) - 2026
