= Stéfanie Clermont =

Canadian writer

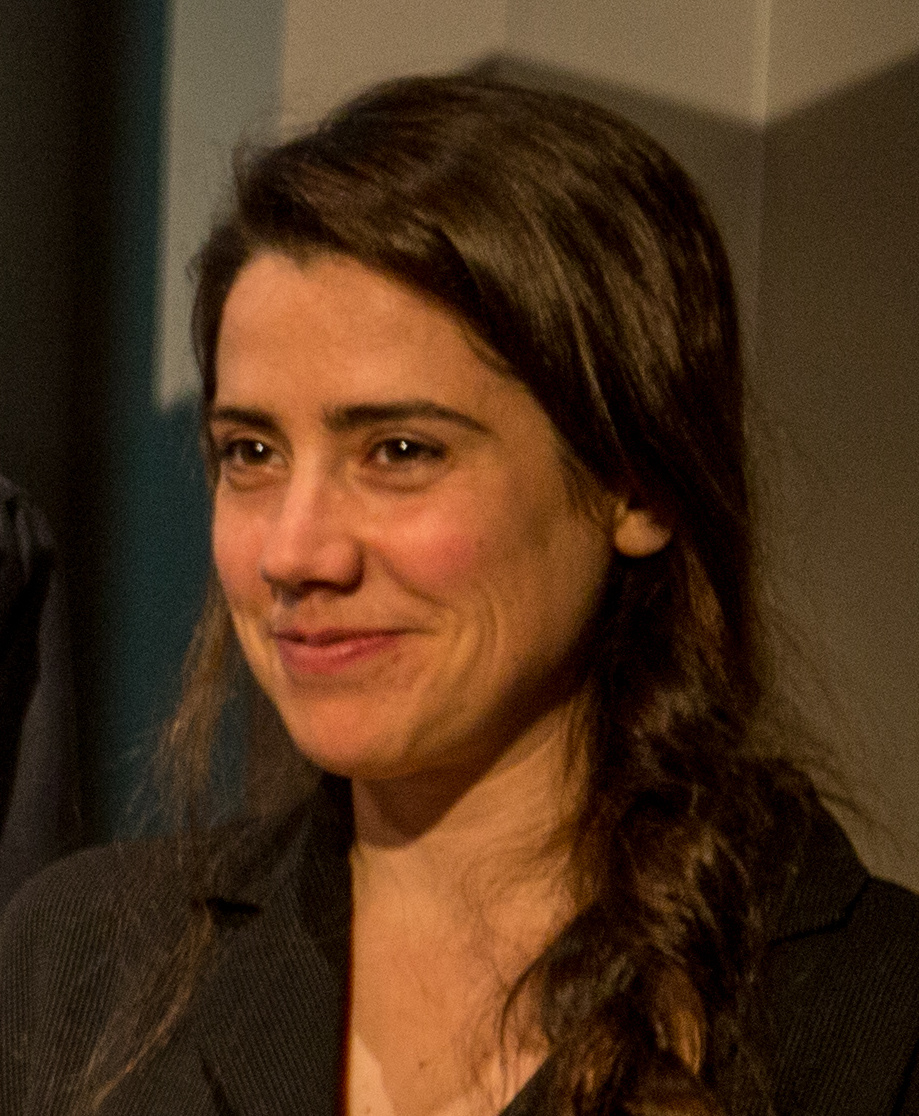
Clermont in 2017.

Stéfanie Clermont (born April 24, 1988) is a Canadian writer, who published her debut novel Le jeu de la musique in 2017.

The novel was published in an English translation, The Music Game, in 2022.

== Biography ==
Originally from Ottawa, Ontario, Clermont won a children's poetry contest sponsored by the Ottawa Public Library in 2001, in the ages 12–14 division. After completing high school, she travelled throughout Canada and the United States before settling in Montreal in 2012.

== Awards and honours ==
Le jeu de la musique won the Prix de l'Œuvre de la relève from the Conseil des arts et des lettres du Québec and the Prix Adrienne-Choquette in 2018. It was a competing title in the 2018 edition of Le Combat des livres, where it was defended by comedian Philippe-Audrey Larrue-St-Jacques.
