= Heat Spell =

2023 Canadian short film directed by Marie-Pier Dupuis

- French: L'Été des chaleurs
- Directed by: Marie-Pier Dupuis
- Written by: Marie-Pier Dupuis
- Produced by: Amélie Tremblay; Dominique Dussault
- Starring: Gabrielle Poulin; Agathe Ledoux; Simone Ledoux
- Cinematography: Simran Dewan
- Edited by: Mathieu Bouchard-Malo
- Music by: Peter Venne
- Production company: Nemesis Films Production
- Distributed by: h264 Distribution
- Release date: April 28, 2023 (BSFF)
- Running time: 13 minutes
- Country: Canada
- Language: French

Heat Spell (French: L'Été des chaleurs) is a Canadian short drama film, written and directed by Marie-Pier Dupuis and released in 2023. The film dramatizes a true story from Dupuis's own childhood, when her mother accidentally left her sister locked in the car on a hot summer day, and Dupuis herself didn't do or say anything about it because she was mad at her sister for other reasons.

The film stars Gabrielle Poulin as the mother, and real-life sisters Agathe Ledoux and Simone Ledoux as the sisters Maxime and Fred.

The film premiered at the 2023 Brussels Short Film Festival, where it was the winner of the ARTE Award in the international competition. It was later screened at the 2023 Abitibi-Témiscamingue International Film Festival, where it won the Prix Unis for short films.

The film received a Canadian Screen Award nomination for Best Live Action Short Drama, and Agathe Ledoux was nominated for Best Performance in a Live Action Short Drama, at the 12th Canadian Screen Awards in 2024.
