= Follies (film) =

2025 Canadian comedy film

- Promotional release poster
- French: Folichonneries
- Directed by: Eric K. Boulianne
- Written by: Eric K. Boulianne; Alexandre Auger
- Produced by: Eric K. Boulianne; Hany Ouichou; Laurie Pominville
- Starring: Eric K. Boulianne; Catherine Chabot
- Cinematography: François Messier-Rheault
- Edited by: Myriam Magassouba
- Music by: Peter Venne
- Production company: Coop Vidéo de Montréal
- Distributed by: Entract Films
- Release date: August 10, 2025 (Locarno)
- Running time: 101 minutes
- Country: Canada
- Language: French

Follies (French: Folichonneries) is a 2025 Canadian sex comedy film co-written, co-produced and directed by Eric K. Boulianne. The film stars Boulianne and Catherine Chabot as François and Julie, a couple whose 16-year marriage has grown sexually unfulfilling, who therefore decide to embark on an open relationship. The cast also includes Sophie Letourneur, Agathe Ledoux, Julie Le Breton, Ève Landry, Florence Blain Mbaye, Étienne Galloy, and Antonin Mousseau-Rivard in supporting roles.

The film, Boulianne's full-length directorial debut, entered production in fall 2024 in Montreal, and premiered at the 78th Locarno Film Festival on August 10, 2025.

On July 21, 2025, it was announced that Totem Films has acquired the rights for the international sales of the film.

== Cast ==
- Eric K. Boulianne as François
- Catherine Chabot as Julie
- Florence Blain Mbaye as Suzanne
- Étienne Galloy as Étienne
- Sarah Chouinard Poirier as Maxine
- Simone Bellemare-Ledoux as Lili
- Agathe Ledoux as Louise
- Antonin Mousseau-Rivard as Antonin
- Sophie Letourneur as Sophie
- Ève Landry as Sonia
- Éric Robidoux as Luc
- Julie Le Breton as Mrs. Sirois

== Release ==
Follies had its world premiere in the 'Filmmakers of the Present Competition' section of the 78th Locarno Film Festival on August 10, 2025, vying for the Golden Leopard – Filmmakers of the Present.

The film also had its North American premiere in the Centrepiece section of the 50th Toronto International Film Festival on September 10, 2025.

It is slated to go into commercial release on January 30, 2026.

== Reception ==
The film was named to the Toronto International Film Festival's annual year-end Canada's Top Ten list for 2026.

== Accolades ==
Award	Date of ceremony	Category	Recipient	Result	Ref.
Locarno Film Festival	August 16, 2025	Golden Leopard – Filmmakers of the Present	Follies	Nominated	
Director's Guild of Canada	2025	Jean-Marc Vallée DGC Discovery Award	Follies	Longlisted	
Kingston Canadian Film Festival	2026	Best First Feature	Follies	Won	
Canadian Screen Awards	2026	Best Picture	Laurie Pominville, Hany Ouichou, Éric K. Boulianne	Nominated	
Canadian Screen Awards	2026	Best Director	Éric K. Boulianne	Nominated	
Canadian Screen Awards	2026	Best Lead Performance in a Comedy Film	Éric K. Boulianne	Nominated	
Canadian Screen Awards	2026	Best Lead Performance in a Comedy Film	Catherine Chabot	Nominated	
Canadian Screen Awards	2026	Best Supporting Performance in a Comedy Film	Agathe Ledoux	Nominated	
Canadian Screen Awards	2026	Best Original Screenplay	Alexandre Auger, Éric K. Boulianne	Nominated	
Canadian Screen Awards	2026	Best Editing	Myriam Magassouba	Nominated	
Canadian Screen Awards	2026	John Dunning Best First Feature Award	Éric K. Boulianne	Nominated	
Rendez-vous Québec Cinéma	2026	Prix Gilles-Carle	Éric K. Boulianne	Won	
