= Yo (film) =

2015 Mexican drama film

- Mexican theatrical release poster
- Directed by: Matías Meyer
- Screenplay by: Matías Meyer; Alexandre Auger
- Produced by: Julio Bárcenas; Matías Meyer; Israel Cárdenas; Laura Amelia Guzmán
- Starring: Raúl Silva; Elizabeth Mendoza; Ignacio Rojas; Isis Vanessa Cortés
- Cinematography: Gerardo Barroso Alcalá
- Edited by: León Felipe González
- Music by: Galo Durán; Chac Moola
- Production companies: LUC La Película; Axolote Cine
- Release date: October 23, 2015 (Morelia)
- Running time: 80 minutes
- Countries: Mexico; Canada; Switzerland; Holland; Dominican Republic
- Language: Spanish
- Budget: USD$400,000

Yo ("Me") is a 2015 Mexican drama film, directed and written by Matías Meyer. The film stars Raúl Silva, as a young man, with limited mental skills. He says he is fifteen years old, although he seems to be older. He lives and works in his mother's restaurant by a busy freeway. One day he meets Elena, an eleven-year-old girl, who will change his life forever. Yo is adapted by Meyer and Alexandre Auger from Histoire du pied et autres fantaisies by French author J.M.G. Le Clézio.

Yo premiered at the 13th Morelia International Film Festival and was awarded Best Mexican Feature Film and Best Actor for Raúl Silva. The film also received a nomination for Best Adapted Screenplay at the Ariel Awards of 2016.

== Cast ==
- Raúl Silva as Yo
- Elizabeth Mendoza as Mamá Yo
- Ignacio Rojas Nieto as Pady
- Isis Vanesa Cortés as Elena
- Mireya Ivonne Morales as Sra. Elia
- Alfonso Miguel González as Poncho
- Melody Petite as Jenny
- Félix Miranda Pérez as Capataz
