= Murdochville strike =

1957 mining strike in Quebec, Canada

The Murdochville strike was a mining strike on March 10, 1957, in Quebec, Canada, during the regime of Quebec premier Maurice Duplessis. It provided the impetus and inspiration for other labour leaders to emerge and future calls for labour rights to become vocalized.

One thousand copper miners struck at the Gaspé Copper Mines in Murdochville, Quebec, acquired by mining company Noranda only two years earlier. (Murdochville was named for Noranda executive James Y. Murdoch.)

It was publicly supported by Pierre Trudeau who, as a lawyer in 1957, stated on CBC television that the strikers needed the "whole force of public opinion" in order to win in their efforts. Trudeau called the Murdochville strike a "fight for recognition" and advocated for all trade unions throughout Quebec to show their solidarity and the economic influence they collectively possessed.

The strike failed and was called off in October. Duplessis's labour laws and action against strikers here and in the 1949 Asbestos strike have been cited by individuals such as Pierre Vallières as providing catalyst for the development of his own social and political consciousness and actions.

Gaspé Copper, a 2013 short film by Alexis Fortier Gauthier, was set against the context of the strike.
