= Prank (film) =

2016 Canadian comedy film

- Directed by: Vincent Biron
- Written by: Alexandre Auger; Eric K. Boulianne; Marc-Antoine Rioux; Vincent Biron
- Produced by: Jean-Sébastien Beaudoin Gagnon; Vincent Biron; Eric K. Boulianne; Hany Ouichou
- Starring: Étienne Galloy
- Cinematography: Vincent Biron
- Edited by: Alexandre Leblanc
- Music by: Peter Venne
- Production companies: Art et essai Le Giragon; Romance Polanski
- Distributed by: Funflim Distribution
- Release date: 30 August 2016 (Hamburg Film Festival)
- Running time: 78 minutes
- Country: Canada
- Language: French

Prank is a 2016 Canadian comedy film directed by Vincent Biron. It was screened in the Discovery section at the 2016 Toronto International Film Festival.

== Cast ==
- Étienne Galloy as Stefie
- Alexandre Lavigne as Martin
- Constance Massicotte as Lea
- Simon Pigeon as Jean-Se

== Awards ==
The film was shortlisted for the Prix collégial du cinéma québécois in 2017.
