= Simon Pigeon =

Canadian actor (born 1992)

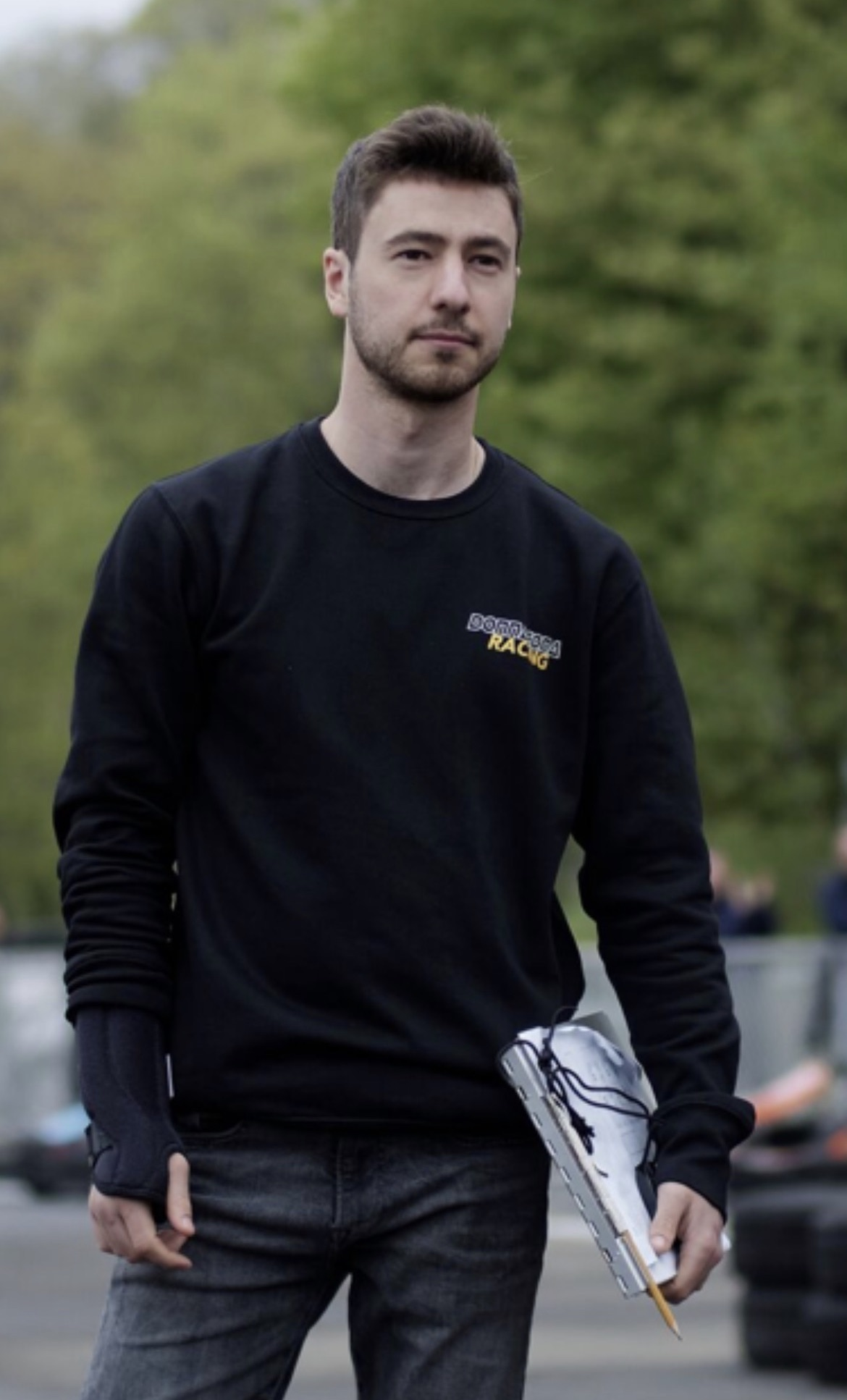
- Born: September 17, 1992 (age 34); Montreal, Quebec, Canada
- Years active: 2000s–present

Simon Pigeon (born September 17, 1992) is a Canadian actor from Quebec. He is most noted for his performance in the film Prank, for which he was a Prix Iris nominee for Best Supporting Actor at the 19th Quebec Cinema Awards in 2017.

Born in Montreal and raised in Terrebonne, he began his career as a child actor, first becoming widely known for the television series Les étoiles filantes.

== Filmography ==
=== Film ===
| Year | Title | Role | Notes |
|---|---|---|---|
| 2003 | Stork Derby | | |
| 2005 | Open Sea | Janitor | |
| 2006 | Interzone | | |
| 2006 | À l'ombre | Nicolas | |
| 2007 | Y a-t-il un homme dans la salle | | |
| 2008 | A No-Hit No-Run Summer (Un été sans point ni coup sûr) | Proulx | |
| 2008 | The Deserter (Le Déserteur) | Fernand Larochelle | |
| 2013 | When We Were Boys (Il était une fois les Boys) | Stan Ouellet | |
| 2014 | 1987 | Caron | |
| 2014 | Corbo | Jacques | |
| 2014 | Puzzle | Laurent | |
| 2015 | The Mirage (Le Mirage) | Employee #1 | |
| 2016 | By the Pool | Simon | |
| 2016 | Prank | Jean-Se | |
| 2018 | Simon | | |
| 2018 | With Love (L'Amour) | David | |
| 2019 | Be Yourself | Craig | |
| 2020 | Flashwood | Louis | |
| 2020 | The Marina (La Marina) | Host #1 | |
| 2020 | Comme des garçons | Nino | |
| 2022 | Her Home | Guy | |
| 2022 | Tulipe conne | Simon | |

=== Television ===
| Year | Title | Role | Notes |
|---|---|---|---|
| 2007 | Les étoiles filantes | Thomas Préfontaine-Beauséjour | |
| 2009 | Tactik | Kevin Boilard | |
| 2010 | Toute la vérité | Jordan Delorme | |
| 2015 | Les Beaux malaises | Hotel waiter | |
| 2015 | Têtes d'affiche | Marius Martel | |
| 2017 | District 31 | Zacharie Déziel | |
| 2017 | Terreur 404 | Patry | |
| 2017 | Olivier | Adrien Lafleur | |
| 2018 | Le Band et Sébastien | Olivier | |
| 2020 | 5e rang | | |
| 2020 | FLQ la traque | Francis Simard | |
| 2021–2023 | Entre deux draps | Jean-Pascal | |
| 2021 | Caméra Café | Jocelyn Simard | |
| 2021 | Nuit blanche | Bertrand Desmarais in 1970 | |
| 2024 | Discrètes | | |
