= Barbarians of the Bay =

2019 Canadian comedy-drama film

- Film poster
- French: Les Barbares de La Malbaie
- Directed by: Vincent Biron
- Written by: Alexandre Auger; Eric K. Boulianne; Marc-Antoine Rioux
- Produced by: Hany Ouichou
- Starring: Philippe-Audrey Larrue-Saint-Jacques; Justin Leyrolles-Bouchard
- Cinematography: Marie Davignon
- Edited by: Alexandre Leblanc
- Production companies: Art & Essai
- Distributed by: Entract Films
- Release date: November 22, 2019
- Running time: 115 minutes
- Country: Canada
- Language: French

Barbarians of the Bay (French: Les Barbares de La Malbaie) is a Canadian comedy-drama film, directed by Vincent Biron and released in 2019. The film stars Philippe-Audrey Larrue-Saint-Jacques as Yves, a hockey player who failed at the National Hockey League level and has been reduced to playing amateur hockey in La Malbaie, Quebec. After being sidelined by an injury that has prevented him from playing in the national championship tournament in Thunder Bay, Ontario, he enlists his younger cousin Jean-Philippe (Justin Leyrolles-Bouchard), who also loves hockey but aspires to be a sports agent rather than a player, to drive him on a road trip to the tournament in an attempt to reclaim his rightful glory on the ice.

According to Biron, the film was made with the intention of exploring the life trajectory of the many hockey players who don't make it to the big leagues rather than the relatively few who do.

The film held an advance screening event in Montreal on November 18, 2019 before opening in theatres on November 22.
