= You're Sleeping Nicole =

2014 film

- Film poster
- French: Tu dors Nicole
- Directed by: Stéphane Lafleur
- Written by: Stéphane Lafleur
- Produced by: Luc Déry; Kim McCraw
- Starring: Julianne Côté; Marc-André Grondin
- Cinematography: Sara Mishara
- Edited by: Sophie Leblond
- Music by: Rémy Nadeau-Aubin; Christophe Lamarche-Ledoux
- Production companies: Fullum Films Studios microscope
- Distributed by: Christal Films
- Release date: 20 May 2014 (Cannes)
- Running time: 93 minutes
- Country: Canada
- Language: French
- Budget: CA$3.5 million

You're Sleeping Nicole (French: Tu dors Nicole) is a 2014 Canadian drama film directed by Stéphane Lafleur. It was selected to be screened as part of the Directors' Fortnight section of the 2014 Cannes Film Festival. The film had a limited release (in Montreal) on 22 August 2014, followed by a general Quebec theatrical release on 29 August 2014. It was screened in the Contemporary World Cinema section at the 2014 Toronto International Film Festival.

The film stars Julianne Côté as Nicole, a young woman who is becoming increasingly disillusioned with her quiet small-town life over the course of a summer.

== Plot ==
Nicole Gagnon is left at home for the summer as her parents go on vacation. Looking forward to a peaceful summer she is annoyed when her brother, Rémi, brings his band to the house to practice. She develops a crush on his new drummer, JF.

Restless and unable to sleep Nicole decides to use her new credit card to take a vacation. She and her best friend Véronique decide to quit their jobs to go to Iceland for the summer.

After Nicole buys the tickets Véronique reveals she does not want to go and the two have a falling out. Nicole is also fired from her job at a thrift shop for theft.

Rémi's band dissolves as his best friend is having a child with his girlfriend and he fires JF in anger. He confesses to Nicole he doesn't like playing solo.

Nicole goes back to babysitting Martin, a small boy with an adult's voice who has a crush on her. He tells her he is in no rush and will wait for her. After his confession she falls asleep.

Returning home she finds the band asleep after practice with JF and Véronique in her parents bed. She throws JF's drum in the pool.

== Cast ==
- Marc-André Grondin as Rémi Gagnon
- Fanny Mallette as Mère de Martin
- Julianne Côté as Nicole Gagnon
- Francis La Haye as JF / batteur
- Catherine St-Laurent as Véronique Simard
- Simon Larouche as Pat / bassiste

== Reception ==
The film was included in the list of Canada's Top Ten feature films of 2014, selected by a panel of filmmakers and industry professionals organized by TIFF.

It has a Metacritic score of 79%.

Released in the United States under the title Tu Dors Nicole, the film garnered positive reviews in The New York Times and other publications, for an average rating of 7.8/10 at Rotten Tomatoes.

When film critic Barry Hertz created a list of the 23 best Canadian films ever made for The Globe and Mail in 2023, although You're Sleeping Nicole was not one of his own selections it was singled out in a sidebar as a favourite of filmmaker Chandler Levack.

=== Awards ===
The film garnered six Canadian Screen Award nominations at the 3rd Canadian Screen Awards, including Best Picture, Best Director (Lafleur), Best Actress (Côté), Best Supporting Actor (Marc-André Grondin), Best Supporting Actress (Catherine St-Laurent) and Best Original Screenplay (Lafleur).

Tu Dors Nicole had nine Jutra Award nominations (the second-most of any film for 2014), winning for Best Sound (Sylvain Bellemare, Pierre Bertrand, and Bernard Gariépy Strobl) and Best Original Music (Rémi Nadeau-Aubin and Christophe Lamarche-Ledoux).

The Vancouver Film Critics Circle named Tu Dors Nicole Best Canadian Film of 2014, and also honoured it for Best Actress in a Canadian Film (Côté) and Best Supporting Actor in a Canadian Film (Grondin).

The film was the winner of the Prix collégial du cinéma québécois in 2015.

== Home video ==
Kino Lorber has announced a Blu-ray and DVD of Tu Dors Nicole, to be released on 27 October 2015.
