= The Cost of Heaven =

2025 Canadian drama film

- Official release poster
- French: Gagne ton ciel
- Directed by: Mathieu Denis
- Written by: Mathieu Denis; Alexandre Auger
- Produced by: Hany Ouichou; Nadim Cheikhrouha
- Starring: Samir Guesmi
- Cinematography: Sara Mishara
- Edited by: Nicolas Roy
- Music by: Olivier Alary
- Production companies: Coop Vidéo de Montréal; Tanit Films
- Distributed by: Maison 4:3
- Release date: September 9, 2025 (TIFF)
- Running time: 116 minutes
- Country: Canada
- Language: French

The Cost of Heaven (French: Gagne ton ciel) is a Canadian thriller drama film, directed by Mathieu Denis and released in 2025. The film stars Samir Guesmi as Nacer Belkacem, a man who has seemingly built an enviable career and family life, but who has in fact accumulated significant debt from overspending and bad investments, and who thus hatches a desperate plan to stave off financial disaster.

The cast also includes Crixus Lapointe, Meriem Medjkane, Brett Donahue, Marie-Josée Bélanger and Samir Firouz in supporting roles.

The film received production funding from Quebec's Société de développement des entreprises culturelles in 2023, and was shot in Montreal in fall 2024.

The film premiered in the Centrepiece program at the 2025 Toronto International Film Festival. It is also slated to screen in the Borsos Competition program at the 2025 Whistler Film Festival.

== Cast ==
- Samir Guesmi as Nacer Belkacem
- Crixius Lapointe as Felix Boyd-Novak
- Meriem Medjkane as Farrah
- Vincent Leclerc as Richard
- Adrien Bletton as Thibaud de Balanthier-Lantage
- Mohammed Marouazi as Rafik
- Victoria Diamond as Sarah Novak
- Brett Donahue as Michael Boyd
- Vlasta Vrána as Ben Novak

== Release ==
The Cost of Heaven premiered at the Toronto International Film Festival on September 9, 2025. The film was then screened at various other film festivals across Canada, France, and the United States between February and October 2026, including the Miami Film Festival and the Reims Polar International Film Festival.

The Cost of Heaven became available on digital streaming in select regions on November 6, 2026.

== Critical response ==
Sarah Gopaul of That Shelf wrote that "as Nacer’s fallacy turns into delusion, his grip on right and wrong erodes. While the camera views are mostly traditional, there are two key points in the narrative that intentionally stand out. As Nacer goes past the point of no return, the camera rotates to reflect his unstable mental state. Viewers can guess what Nacer going off the deep end will look like, but it’s not exactly as you’d expect. The revolving perspective acts as a turning point in the story."

== Awards ==
Award	Year	Category	Work	Result	Reference
Cinéfest Sudbury International Film Festival	2025	Outstanding French-Language Feature Film	Mathieu Denis	Won	
Kingston Canadian Film Festival	2026	Best Film (Playback Prize)	Mathieu Denis	Won	
