= Heart Bomb =

2019 Canadian short film

- Film poster
- French: Une bombe au cœur
- Directed by: Rémi St-Michel
- Written by: Alexandre Auger; Eric K. Boulianne; Marc-Antoine Rioux; Rémi St-Michel
- Produced by: Christian Larouche; Sébastien Létourneau
- Starring: Alexis Lefebvre
- Cinematography: François Messier-Rheault
- Edited by: Sophie Benoît Sylvestre
- Music by: Peter Venne
- Production companies: Christal Films; Panache Films
- Release date: September 2019 (FCVQ)
- Running time: 21 minutes
- Country: Canada
- Language: French

Heart Bomb (French: Une bombe au cœur) is a 2019 Canadian short film, directed by Rémi St-Michel. The film stars Alexis Lefebvre as an actor who must confront his fears when a role requires him to perform a dangerous stunt.

The cast also includes Brigitte Poupart, Julianne Côté, Sébastien René, Guillaume Cyr, Eric K. Boulianne, Normand Daoust, Étienne Galloy and Müller Hammadi.

The film won the award for Best Canadian Short Film at the 2019 Quebec City Film Festival, and was a Prix Iris nominee for Best Live Action Short Film at the 22nd Quebec Cinema Awards in 2020.
