= Sara Montpetit =

Canadian actress and environmental activist

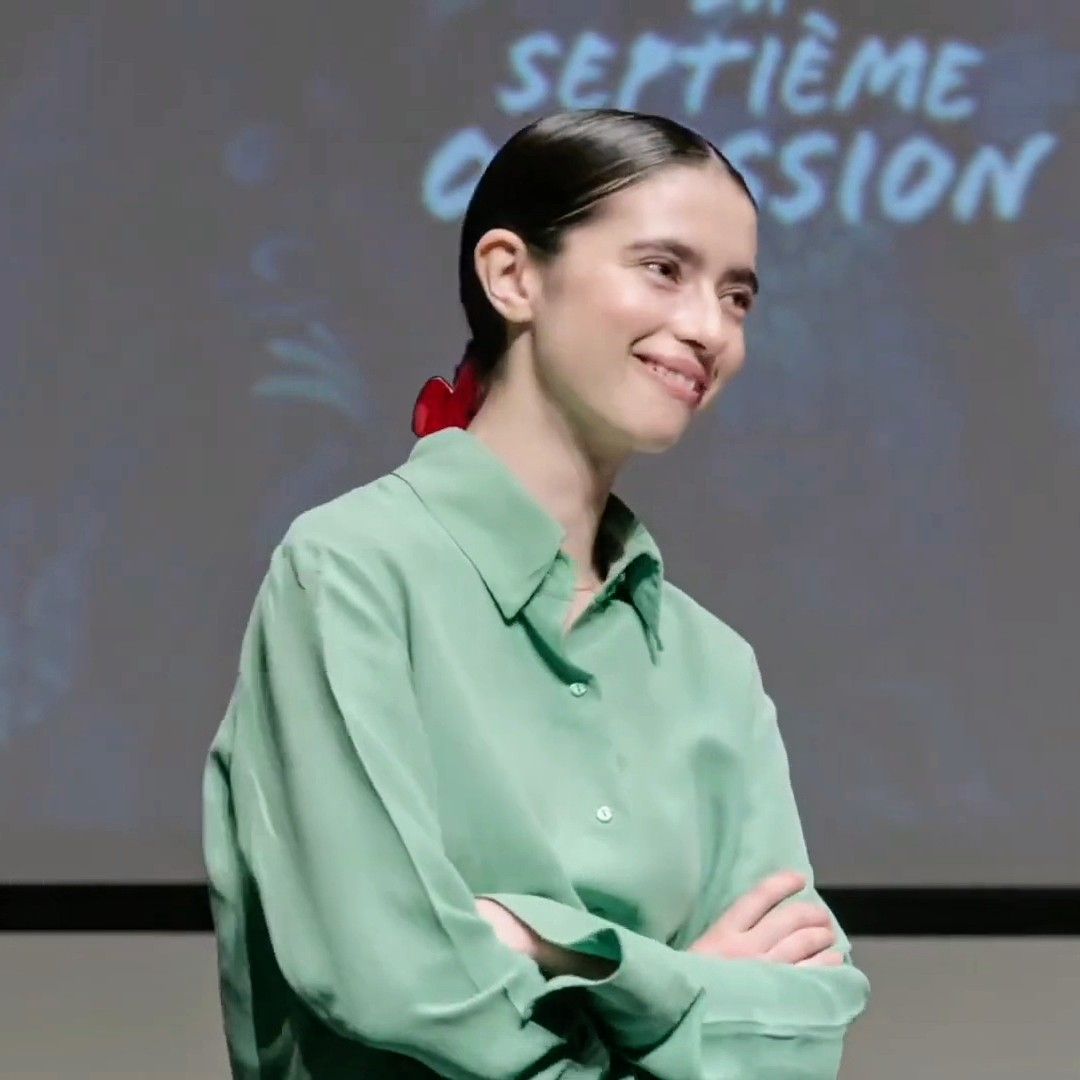
- Montpetit in 2022
- Born: 2001 or 2002 (age 24–25)
- Education: Cégep de Saint-Laurent
- Occupation: Actor
- Years active: 2021–present

Sara Montpetit (born 2001 or 2002) is a French Canadian actress and environmental activist from Quebec. She is most noted for her performance in the 2021 film Maria Chapdelaine, for which she won the Prix Iris for Revelation of the Year at the 24th Quebec Cinema Awards.

== Career ==
In 2021, she garnered acclaim for her performance in the film Maria Chapdelaine, winning the Prix Iris for Revelation of the Year at the 24th Quebec Cinema Awards. That year, she was also cast in Charlotte Le Bon's debut feature film Falcon Lake.

Falcon Lake film was shot in mid-2021 in and around Gore, Quebec, during the COVID-19 pandemic. The film debuted in the Director's Fortnight program at the 2022 Cannes Film Festival on May 18, 2022. It had its Canadian premiere at the 2022 Toronto International Film Festival.

In 2022, she was cast as Sasha, a teenage vampire who befriends Paul (Félix-Antoine Bénard), a boy with suicidal tendencies, in Ariane Louis-Seize's Humanist Vampire Seeking Consenting Suicidal Person (Vampire humaniste cherche suicidaire consentant), planned for release in 2023. Humanist Vampire Seeking Consenting Suicidal Person premiered at the 80th Venice International Film Festival on September 3, 2023. The film had its Canadian premiere in the Centrepiece program at the 2023 Toronto International Film Festival.

== Filmography ==
=== Film ===
Year	Title	Role	Notes
2021	Maria Chapdelaine	Maria Chapdelaine	
2022	Falcon Lake	Chloé	
2022	White Dog (Chien blanc)	Madeleine	
2023	The Flower Darkens (À la fontaine)	Alice	Short film
2023	Humanist Vampire Seeking Consenting Suicidal Person (Vampire humaniste cherche suicidaire consentant)	Sasha	
2023	My Girl (Ma poule)	Madeleine	Short film
2025	Where Souls Go (Où vont les âmes?)	Anna	
2026	Toy Gun Bandit (Faux gun bandit)		
TBA	2024, Une Année Quelconque	Lomane	

== Accolades ==
For her performance in the film Maria Chapdelaine, Montpetit won the Prix Iris for Revelation of the Year at the 24th Quebec Cinema Awards.

For her performance in Falcon Lake, Montpetit received both a Canadian Screen Award nomination for Best Supporting Performance in a Film at the 11th Canadian Screen Awards, and a Prix Iris nomination for Best Actress at the 25th Quebec Cinema Awards.

In 2024 she received a Canadian Screen Award nomination for Best Lead Performance in a Comedy Film at the 12th Canadian Screen Awards, and a Prix Iris nomination for Best Actress at the 26th Quebec Cinema Awards, for Humanist Vampire.
