= Garage at Night =

- French: Garage de soir
- Directed by: Daniel Daigle
- Written by: Daniel Daigle
- Produced by: Aurélie Breton; Daniel Daigle
- Starring: Guillaume Laurin; Ève Lemieux; Stéphane Messier; Antoine Pilon
- Cinematography: Louis Lavoie Isebaert
- Edited by: Daniel Daigle
- Music by: David Fleury
- Release date: 2017
- Running time: 13 minutes
- Country: Canada
- Language: French

Garage at Night (French: Garage de soir) is a Canadian short drama film, directed by Daniel Daigle and released in 2017. The film stars Guillaume Laurin, Ève Lemieux, Stéphane Messier and Antoine Pilon, and centres on two brothers.

The film won the Prix Télé-Québec for best short film at the Abitibi-Témiscamingue International Film Festival.

At the 6th Canadian Screen Awards in 2018, the film was shortlisted for Best Live Action Short Drama.
