= Ireland Blue Book =

2023 Canadian comedy film

- French: Irlande cahier bleu
- Directed by: Olivier Godin
- Written by: Olivier Godin
- Produced by: Amélie Tremblay; Olivier Godin
- Starring: Emery Habwineza; Florence Blain Mbaye; Étienne Pilon; Ève Duranceau
- Cinematography: Renaud Després-Larose
- Edited by: Olivier Godin
- Production company: Palabres
- Release date: July 28, 2023 (Fantasia)
- Running time: 82 minutes
- Country: Canada
- Language: French

Ireland Blue Book (French: Irlande cahier bleu) is a Canadian comedy film, directed by Olivier Godin and released in 2023. The film stars Emery Habwineza as Ducarmel, a firefighter and basketball player who has fantastical dreams about being sent on an intergalactic mission in outer space when he falls asleep at night.

The cast also includes Étienne Pilon, Florence Blain Mbaye, Ève Duranceau, Stéphane Crête, Jean-Marc Dalpé, Johanna Nutter, François-Simon Poirier, Charlotte Aubin, Rawam Sleiman, Philomène Lévesque-Rainville, Élia Dassi, Annie Darisse-Desbiens, Suzanne Beth, Anne Lapierre, Josée Laviolette, Pierre Mailloux and Samer Najari in supporting roles.

== Production ==
Ducarmel previously appeared, also played by Habwineza, as a minor supporting character in Godin's previous film There Are No False Undertakings (Il n'y a pas de faux métier).

== Distribution ==
The film premiered in July 2023 at the Fantasia International Film Festival, where it was named the winner of the Camera Lucida award from the Association québécoise des critiques de cinéma.

It went into commercial distribution in September 2023.
