= Fanmi =

2021 Canadian short film

- Directed by: Sandrine Brodeur-Desrosiers; Carmine Pierre-Dufour
- Written by: Carmine Pierre-Dufour
- Produced by: François Bonneau
- Starring: Mireille Métellus; Marie-Evelyne Lessard
- Cinematography: Léna Mill-Reuillard
- Edited by: Myriam Magassouba
- Music by: Peter Venne
- Production company: By-Pass Films
- Distributed by: H264 Distribution
- Release date: September 10, 2021 (TIFF)
- Running time: 14 minutes
- Country: Canada
- Languages: French; Creole

Fanmi is a Canadian short drama film, directed by Sandrine Brodeur-Desrosiers and Carmine Pierre-Dufour and released in 2021. The film stars Mireille Métellus and Marie-Evelyne Lessard as Monique and Martine, a mother and daughter who are supporting each other through difficult times as Martine's partner Simon has recently committed suicide, while Monique is awaiting the results of medical tests to determine whether or not she has a serious illness.

The film was included in Telefilm Canada's Not Short on Talent program in the industry film market of the Clermont-Ferrand International Short Film Festival in 2021, but was not screened for the general public. It had its public premiere at the 2021 Toronto International Film Festival.

The film was named to TIFF's annual year-end Canada's Top Ten list for 2021. It was a Canadian Screen Award nominee for Best Live Action Short Drama at the 10th Canadian Screen Awards, and a Prix Iris nominee for Best Live Action Short Film at the 24th Quebec Cinema Awards.
