= How to Get Your Parents to Divorce =

2022 Canadian comedy-drama film

- French: Pas d'chicane dans ma cabane!
- Directed by: Sandrine Brodeur-Desrosiers
- Written by: Sandrine Brodeur-Desrosiers; Maryse Latendresse
- Produced by: Richard Lalonde
- Starring: Charlotte St-Martin; Isabelle Blais; Pierre-Luc Brillant
- Cinematography: Isabelle Stachtchenko
- Edited by: Myriam Magassouba
- Music by: Peter Venne
- Production company: Forum Films
- Distributed by: Axia Films
- Release date: June 8, 2022
- Running time: 83 minutes
- Country: Canada
- Language: French

How to Get Your Parents to Divorce (French: Pas d'chicane dans ma cabane!, lit. "No Fighting in My House!") is a Canadian comedy-drama film, directed by Sandrine Brodeur-Desrosiers and released in 2022. The film stars Charlotte St-Martin as Justine, a preteen girl who is frustrated by the constant fighting of her parents Julie (Isabelle Blais) and Martin (Pierre-Luc Brillant), and plots with her friends to figure out how to convince them to divorce.

The film's cast also includes Louka Bélanger-Leos, Charlie Fortier, Liam Patenaude, Simone Laperle, Joanie Guérin, Elliot Léonard, Jamal Fortier, Agathe Ledoux and Pierrette Robitaille.

The film premiered at the Festival du film de l'Outaouais on June 8, 2022, before opening commercially on June 10.

== Awards ==
The film was screened at the 2023 Canadian Film Festival, where it won the awards for Best Screenplay and Best Ensemble Cast.
