= Matthias & Maxime =

2019 film by Xavier Dolan

- Theatrical release poster
- Directed by: Xavier Dolan
- Written by: Xavier Dolan
- Produced by: Nancy Grant; Xavier Dolan
- Starring: Gabriel D'Almeida Freitas; Xavier Dolan; Pier-Luc Funk; Samuel Gauthier; Antoine Pilon; Adib Alkhalidey; Anne Dorval; Micheline Bernard; Marilyn Castonguay; Catherine Brunet
- Cinematography: André Turpin
- Edited by: Xavier Dolan
- Music by: Jean-Michel Blais
- Production company: Sons of Manual
- Distributed by: Les Films Séville
- Release dates: 22 May 2019 (Cannes); 9 October 2019 (Canada)
- Running time: 119 minutes
- Country: Canada
- Languages: French; English
- Box office: $1.9 million

Matthias & Maxime is a 2019 Canadian drama film written, directed and edited by Xavier Dolan. It stars Dolan, Gabriel D'Almeida Freitas, Pier-Luc Funk, Samuel Gauthier, Antoine Pilon, Adib Alkhalidey, Anne Dorval, Micheline Bernard, Marilyn Castonguay and Catherine Brunet.

The film had its world premiere at the Cannes Film Festival on 22 May 2019. It was released in Canada on 9 October 2019 by Les Films Séville.

== Plot ==
Matthias and Maxime are lifelong friends in their late twenties living in Montreal. The motivated but uptight Matthias is a successful businessman with a caring girlfriend, Sarah, while the quieter, gentler Maxime is a bartender who spends time taking care of his abusive, alcoholic mother. Matthias is primed for a promotion at his job while Maxime is preparing to move to Australia for work opportunities.

The two take a trip to the lakeside cabin of a wealthy friend, Rivette. Rivette's pushy sister, Érika, is a film student and pressures Matthias and Maxime to appear in her student short film, as her two actors have dropped out. Maxime capitulates and agrees to participate in the project, and Matthias is later forced to join after losing a bet to Rivette. They are upset to later learn that their scene will require them to kiss, but their friends remind them that they had kissed before, years earlier in high school, which Matthias claimed was the result of him being under the influence of party drugs. Nevertheless, they share a kiss (offscreen) for the film.

The kiss has a profound, distracting effect on Matthias, who cannot sleep the next morning and goes for a swim, accidentally ending up on the wrong side of the lake; later, he turns down a job promotion and argues with Sarah. He is further unnerved when Erika shows the completed short film at a get-together thrown by her mother, though Sarah seems to understand his conflicted feelings. Meanwhile, Maxime turns over care of his mother's estate to his aunt and tries to obtain a letter of recommendation from Matthias's father, who is a successful businessman in Chicago. Both men are further confused by the kiss due to their understood interest in women, and Matthias is especially upset because of his relationship with Sarah.

Matthias tries to get out of attending Maxime's party, apparently in denial that he will actually leave for Australia, but Sarah pushes for him to go. He upsets their friends by arriving late, making a poor speech for Maxime, and initially turning down the invitation for an afterparty with the rest of their friends, before Sarah convinces him to attend. At the afterparty, he further antagonizes the group by starting an argument during a party game and getting into a fight, culminating in insulting Maxime's facial birthmark. Matthias leaves the party angrily before returning and apologizing. After the night is over, he and Maxime share a kiss and a brief sexual encounter, but Matthias breaks away, leaving Maxime hurt and confused.

Later, Matthias goes to a strip club with a business associate before abruptly leaving to run through the streets. Maxime cleans out his house in preparation for moving and discovers a childhood drawing of himself and Matthias living on a farm together, which touches him. He finally receives a call back from the office of Matthias' father, as he had inquired after his missing letter of recommendation; the secretary informs him that it was actually sent to Matthias, who had failed to forward it to him. Maxime realizes Matthias' state of denial and has the letter forwarded to his email directly. Ready to leave, Maxime departs his home to meet a friend who will take him to the airport, and is happy to see that Matthias is there waiting for him as well.

== Cast ==
- Gabriel D'Almeida Freitas as Matthias Rivas
- Xavier Dolan as Maxime Leduc
- Pier-Luc Funk as Rivette
- Samuel Gauthier as Frank
- Antoine Pilon as Brass
- Adib Alkhalidey as Shariff
- Micheline Bernard as Francine
- Anne Dorval as Manon
- Marilyn Castonguay as Sarah
- Catherine Brunet as Lisa
- Harris Dickinson as Kevin McAfee
- Camille Felton as Érika

== Production ==
In January 2018, it was announced that Dolan would write, direct, produce, and star in the film, alongside Anne Dorval. In August 2018, it was announced Pier-Luc Funk and Micheline Bernard joined the cast of the film. In September 2018, Gabriel D'Almeida Freitas, Antoine Pilon, Samuel Gauthier, Adib Alkhalidey, Catherine Brunet and Marilyn Castonguay joined the cast of the film. In November 2018, Another Man magazine mentioned that Harris Dickinson had just finished filming with Dolan and would be co-starring in the film.

Principal photography began on 15 August 2018 in Montreal and the Laurentides, and wrapped on 15 November 2018.

== Music ==
Original soundtrack is composed by Jean-Michel Blais, a pianist and composer living in Montreal, Canada. His piano piece called "Solitude" was inspired, amongst other sources, by Franz Schubert's "Themes and Variations". Blais was honoured on 25 May 2019 with the Cannes Soundtrack Award for his work in the film.

Notable songs used include "Work Bitch" by Britney Spears, "J'ai cherché" by Amir Haddad, "Always on My Mind" by Pet Shop Boys, "Stranger's Kiss" by Alex Cameron and Angel Olsen, and "Song for Zula" by Phosphorescent.

== Release ==
Matthias & Maxime had its world premiere at the Cannes Film Festival on 22 May 2019. The film was released in Canada on 9 October 2019 by Les Films Séville. In May 2020, Mubi acquired distribution rights to the film in the United States, United Kingdom, Ireland, Australia, New Zealand, Latin America (excluding Mexico), and India. It was released on Mubi on 28 August 2020.

== Reception ==
On the review aggregator website Rotten Tomatoes, the film holds an approval rating of 63% based on 76 reviews, with an average rating of 6.5/10. The website's critics consensus reads, "Matthias and Maxime enchants almost as much as it frustrates, although Xavier Dolan fans may appreciate seeing the writer-director working at a more restrained pitch." Metacritic, which uses a weighted average, assigned the film a score of 60 out of 100, based on 18 critics, indicating "mixed or average" reviews.

In December 2019, the film was named to TIFF's annual year-end Canada's Top Ten list. The film was nominated for seven awards at the 22nd Quebec Cinema Awards, including Best Supporting Actor for Funk and Best Editing for Dolan. It won for Best Supporting Actress for Bernard, Best Music for Jean-Michel Blais and Most Successful Film Outside Quebec.

The film was shortlisted for the Prix collégial du cinéma québécois in 2020.
