= Catherine St-Laurent =

Canadian actress

Catherine St-Laurent is a Canadian actress from Quebec. She is best known for her debut feature film performance as Véronique in You're Sleeping Nicole (Tu dors Nicole), for which she was a Best Supporting Actress nominee at both the 3rd Canadian Screen Awards and the 17th Jutra Awards in 2015.

In 2016, she appeared in the web series Switch & Bitch for TOU.TV. She later appeared in the films Bon Cop, Bad Cop 2 (2017), Mon ami Walid (2019) and The Twentieth Century (2019). In the TV series La Faille (2019) she provided a supporting role.
