= Mon ami Walid =

2019 Canadian comedy-drama film directed by Adib Alkhalidey

- Directed by: Adib Alkhalidey
- Written by: Adib Alkhalidey; Julien Lacroix
- Produced by: Adib Alkhalidey; Éric Belley; Julien Lacroix; Alexis Poulin
- Starring: Adib Alkhalidey; Julien Lacroix
- Cinematography: Ménad Kesraoui
- Edited by: Jacques Barthélémy; David Mills
- Music by: Mathieu Magny; Daniel Moranville
- Release date: January 13, 2019
- Running time: 72 minutes
- Country: Canada
- Language: French

Mon ami Walid ("My Friend Walid") is a Canadian comedy-drama film, directed by Adib Alkhalidey and released in 2019. The film stars Alkhalidey as Walid, a depressed immigrant working in a grocery store in Montreal whose decision to attempt suicide is interrupted by his coworker Antonin (Julien Lacroix), who decides to help Walid out of his mental health struggles by insinuating himself into Walid's life as Walid's new best friend whether Walid wants him around or not.

The cast also includes Iani Bédard, Laurent Paquin, Guy Jodoin, Christian Bégin, Sophie Cadieux, Marie-Ève Perron, Yannick De Martino, Catherine St-Laurent, Jean-François Provençal, Guenièvre Sandré, Isabel Richer, Antoine Pilon, Sophie Caron, Karina Aktouf, Danielle Fichaud, Hubert Proulx, Mehdi Bousaidan and Debbie Lynch-White in supporting roles.

The film, Alkhalidey's full-length directorial debut, was shot in just ten days on a crowdfunded budget of just $150,000. It was originally planned for independent distribution as a web series, but instead premiered at a self-funded theatrical screening in Montreal on January 13, 2019, followed by an independent screening tour of other Quebec cities over the next number of weeks.
