= Gabriel D'Almeida Freitas =

Canadian actor

- Born: Gabriel D'Almeida Freitas; 4 June 1990 (age 35); Quebec City, Quebec, Canada
- Occupations: actor; comedian; screenwriter

Gabriel D'Almeida Freitas (born 4 June 1990) is a Canadian actor, comedian, and screenwriter.

== Biography ==
Born in Quebec City, Quebec, Canada, he is of Portuguese descent. In 2008, D'Almeida Freitas began a career at the Collège Lionel-Groulx, and in 2009, he was accepted to the National School of Humor, from which he graduated in June 2011.

He later worked alongside director Patrice Laliberté and made more than a hundred videos, starring in several of them. His web series was also nominated for the Laurence Olivier Awards.

In 2017, D'Almeida Freitas took part in the return of the reality show Occupation Double on Canadian television.

His acting career had a breakthrough role in September 2018, when Xavier Dolan contacted him to join the cast of his film Matthias & Maxime. In the film, Dolan, who plays Maxime, gave D'Almeida Freitas the role of Matthias. In 2019, the film was selected for the official competition at the 72nd Cannes Film Festival.

Also in 2019, he began to work for Radio Canada, alongside Hélène Bourgeois Leclerc and Roy Dupuis.

== Filmography ==
| Year | Title | Role |
|---|---|---|
| 2016 | Richard Superstar | Richard |
| 2018 | Matthias & Maxime | Matthias |
| 2018 | Mon ami Walid | Bachelor Fairy |
| 2024 | La verbena | Alex |
