= Antoine Pilon =

Canadian actor (born 1993)

Antoine Pilon (born July 9, 1993) is a Canadian actor from Saint-Bruno-de-Montarville, Quebec. He is most noted for his role as Émile Lapointe in the television drama series Nouvelle adresse, for which he was a Gémeaux Award nominee for Best Supporting Actor in a Drama Series in 2015.

His other roles have included the films Garage at Night (Garage de soir), The Squealing Game (La chasse au collet), Mad Dog Labine, Matthias & Maxime, Mon ami Walid, Victoire (La Cordonnière), Out Standing (Seule au front) and The Furies (Les Furies), and the television series Victor Lessard, Terreur 404, Le Chalet, Manuel de la vie sauvage and Entre deux draps.

Over 2019-2023, Pilon was regularly nominated for the Prix Gémeaux.
