= Adib Alkhalidey =

Canadian actor

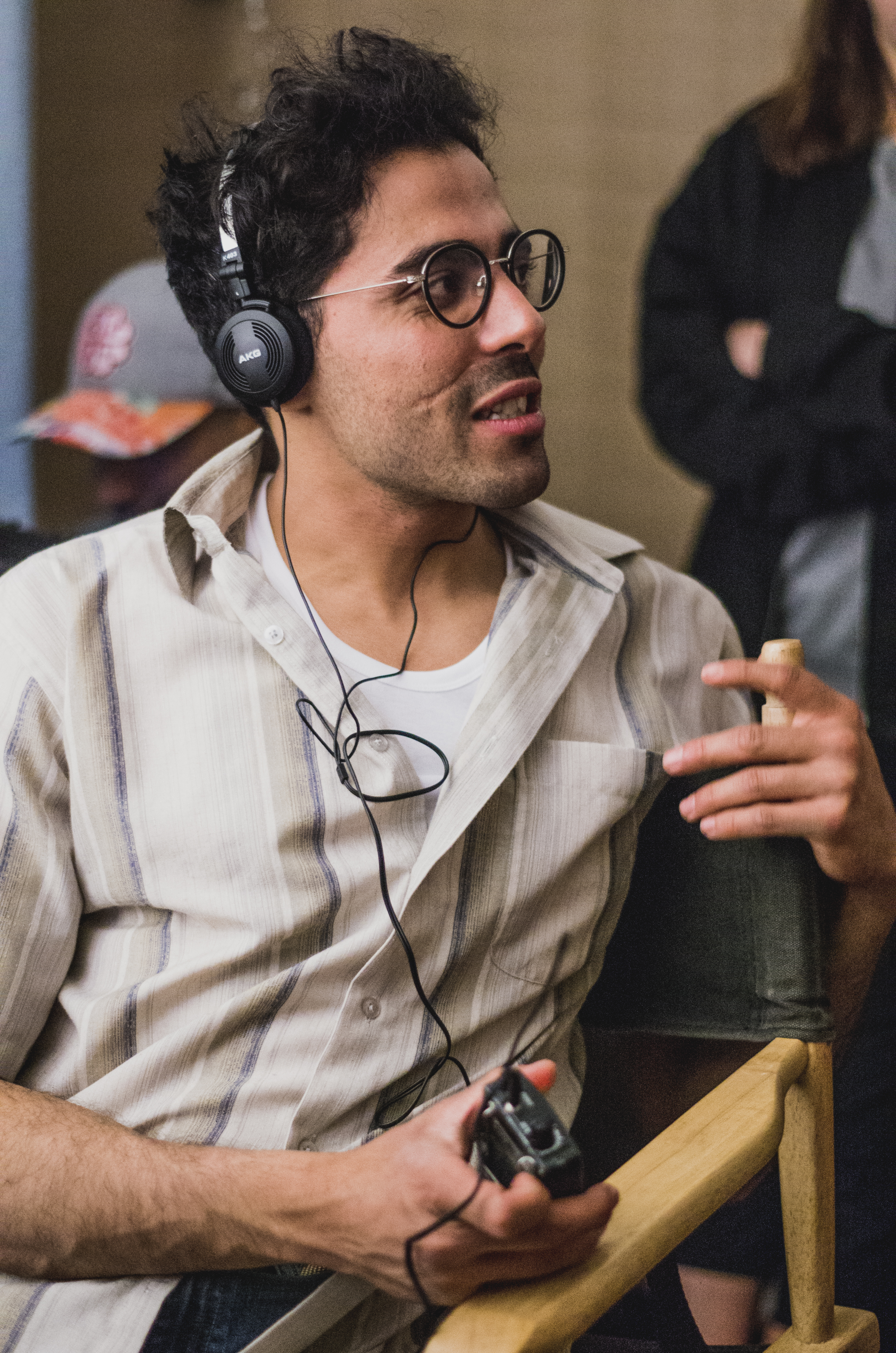
- Alkhalidey in 2018
- Born: Adib Alkhalidey; 1987 or 1988 (age 38–39); Ouarzazate, Morocco
- Citizenship: Canadian
- Occupations: actor; comedian; musician
- Website: https://www.adibalkhalidey.com/ (in French)

Adib Alkhalidey is a Canadian actor, director, singer-songwriter, and comedian.

== Biography ==
Alkhalidey was born in 1988 in Ouarzazate, Morocco, to an Iraqi father and a Moroccan mother. His father had fled from the regime of Saddam Hussein to Morocco, and later relocated the family to Canada.

Alkhalidey graduated from the École nationale de l'humour in Montreal in 2010.

Alkhalidey works as a comedian and a columnist on radio and television. He also writes for other comedians and was the recipient of the Jury Prize at the Franco-Québec Comedy Festival in 2012 and won the Revelation of the Year at the Olivier Awards Gala in 2013.

In October 2015, during the Canadian federal election, Alkhalidey was criticized for mocking women who wore niqab to vote, comparing them with a person wearing a potato sack over their heads.

In 2018 he won the FIPRESCI International Critics' Prize at the Regard film festival for his short film Go Play Outside (Va jouer dehors). The following year he released the comedy-drama film Mon ami Walid, his full-length directorial debut.

He subsequently achieved success with his show Québecois Tabarnak , which won the Félix Award for Comedy Show of the Year in 2023.

In 2023, he released a new musical album, over which he embarked on a tour across Canada.

== Works ==
Year	Title	Role
2016	Hibou	
2017	Go Play Outside (Va jouer dehors)	director
2019	Matthias & Maxime	Shariff
2019	Mon ami Walid	Walid
