= There Are No False Undertakings =

2020 Canadian comedy film

- French: Il n'y a pas de faux métier
- Directed by: Olivier Godin
- Written by: Olivier Godin
- Produced by: Jean-Sébastien Beaudoin Gagnon; Johannie Deschambault
- Starring: Tatiana Zinga Botao; François-Simon Poirier; Leslie Mavangui; Fayolle Jean
- Cinematography: Renaud Després-Larose
- Edited by: Olivier Godin
- Music by: Ana Tapia Rousiouk
- Production company: Chez Sport
- Distributed by: La Distributrice de films
- Release date: October 7, 2020 (FNC)
- Running time: 104 minutes
- Country: Canada
- Language: French

There Are No False Undertakings (French: Il n'y a pas de faux métier) is a Canadian comedy film, directed by Olivier Godin and released in 2020.

The film stars Tatiana Zinga Botao as Marie-Cobra Tremblay, a writer who is working on a screenplay she hopes that Denzel Washington will star in; however, her work is complicated by the disapproval of her ex-husband Rosaire (François-Simon Poirier) and her best friend Mélusine (Leslie Mavangui), Washington's (Fayolle Jean) lack of interest in the project as he is more focused on the goal of getting cast as Angel in a new Buffy the Vampire Slayer reboot, and the discouraging feedback of professional screenwriter Croquette (Eric K. Boulianne).

The film's cast also includes Florence Blain Mbaye, Alexis Martin, Ève Duranceau, Schelby Jean-Baptiste, Jean-Marc Dalpé and Emery Habwineza. Habwineza's character, Ducarmel, appeared in only a minor capacity in There Are No False Undertakings, but was the central character of Godin's next film Ireland Blue Book (Irlande cahier bleu).

The film premiered on October 7, 2020 at the 2020 Festival du nouveau cinéma.

== Critical response ==
Alex Rose of Cult MTL reviewed the film positively, writing that it "goes in every direction at once, a dialogue-dense comedy of manners that subscribes to no particular sense of genre or comedic timing. Though somewhat of a meta-deconstruction of the process of writing a film (with copious jabs at the wonderfulness of grants) and of the invisible borders of intellectualism (prompting the immortal line “Pasolini, y’est-tu sur Netflix?!”), it’s also just fucking weird from top to bottom. It’s rare to see a film that’s so playful and yet so comfortable with alienating the majority of people who might lay eyes on it, which puts it in its own category on the Quebec cinematic landscape." He additionally noted that "it's also extremely rare to see this many people of colour in a Quebec movie that isn’t about street gangs or refugees."

For Screen Anarchy, Shelagh Rowan-Legg wrote that "At nearly two hours, it could have probably trimmed its time a bit; absurdism can get tiring when the audience has to keep up with all the complicated connections, and perhaps a few of the vignettes didn't quite find their feet. Yet overall, There Are No False Undertakings is a bizarre journey into the oddities of a collective imagination, one in which you will likely find your own thoughts (ones you thought to never speak aloud) reflected in delightful characters and their deadpan yet whimsical understakings [sic]."
