= Sandrine Brodeur-Desrosiers =

Canadian film director and producer

- Education: Concordia University (BFA)
- Occupations: film director and producer
- Known for: short film Just Me and You

Sandrine Brodeur-Desrosiers is a Canadian film director and producer from Quebec. She is most noted for her 2019 short film Just Me and You (Juste moi et toi), which was a Canadian Screen Award nominee for Best Live Action Short Drama at the 8th Canadian Screen Awards, and won the Prix Iris for Best Live Action Short Film at the 22nd Quebec Cinema Awards.

== Education ==
Brodeur-Desrosiers graduated from Concordia University with BFA in Film Production. She received an MFA in Classical Acting at the Drama Center London and studied feature writing at L’INIS.

== Career ==
Her 2021 film Fanmi, codirected with Carmine Pierre-Dufour, was named to the Toronto International Film Festival's annual year-end Canada's Top Ten list for 2021.

In 2022, Brodeur-Desrosiers directed her first feature-length film, How to Get Your Parents to Divorce (Pas d'chicane dans ma cabane). The film, aimed at a pre-adolescent audience, premiered at the Festival du film de l'Outaouais (Outaouais Film Festival). She co-wrote the film with Maryse Latendresse.

== Filmography ==
- Un trou dans la mémoire – 2010
- Soon Enough (Avant demain) – 2013
- Kaupunki Etsii Klovnia – 2014
- The Truck (Le Truck) – 2015
- T'es pas game – 2015
- Cast Off (Larguer les amarres) – 2016
- Just Me and You (Juste moi et toi) – 2019
- Fanmi – 2021
- How to Get Your Parents to Divorce (Pas d'chicane dans ma cabane) – 2022
