= Simon Lavoie =

Canadian film director and screenwriter

Simon Lavoie (born May 15, 1979) is a Canadian film director and screenwriter from Quebec. He is best known as codirector with Mathieu Denis of Those Who Make Revolution Halfway Only Dig Their Own Graves (Ceux qui font les révolutions à moitié n'ont fait que se creuser un tombeau), which won the award for Best Canadian Film at the 2016 Toronto International Film Festival and garnered several Canadian Screen Award nominations at the 5th Canadian Screen Awards in 2017, including for Best Picture and Best Director.

He made a number of short films — including The White Chapel (Une chapelle blanche), which won the Prix Jutra for Best Short Film in 2006 — before making his feature film debut in 2008 with The Deserter (Le Déserteur). He first collaborated with Denis on the 2011 film Laurentia (Laurentie), and followed up with The Torrent (Le Torrent) in 2012.

His next project, The Little Girl Who Was Too Fond of Matches (La petite fille qui aimait trop les allumettes), a film adaptation of Gaétan Soucy's novel of the same name, premiered at the Toronto International Film Festival in September 2017. It received an honorable mention for Best Canadian Film, and received a nomination for Best Motion Picture at the 2018 Canadian Screen Awards.

His next film, No Trace (Nulle trace), premiered in 2021. He also wrote the screenplay for the 2022 film Norbourg, directed by Maxime Giroux.

His most recent film, Dissolution (Se fondre), premiered at the 2024 Rendez-vous Québec Cinéma.
