= Queering the Script =

2019 Canadian documentary film

- Directed by: Gabrielle Zilkha
- Written by: Gabrielle Zilkha
- Produced by: Alex House; Steph Ouaknine
- Cinematography: Marianna Margaret
- Edited by: Shelley Therrien
- Music by: Armen Bazarian
- Production company: Shaftesbury Films
- Distributed by: Hollywood Suite
- Release date: May 26, 2019 (Inside Out)
- Running time: 93 minutes
- Country: Canada
- Language: English

Queering the Script is a 2019 Canadian documentary film, directed by Gabrielle Zilkha. Beginning at ClexaCon, a fan convention for lesbian, bisexual, queer and transgender women, the film explores the issue of LGBTQ representation in media, including the ways in which social media activism has influenced the telling of queer women's stories in entertainment by organizing campaigns against storytelling tropes such as queerbaiting and Dead Lesbian Syndrome.

The film premiered on May 26, 2019 at the Inside Out Film and Video Festival in Toronto. It was subsequently screened at Outfest in Los Angeles, where it won a Special Programming Award for Freedom.
