= Philippe-Audrey Larrue-Saint-Jacques =

Canadian actor and comedian

Saint-Jacques at the Olivier awards in 2021.

Philippe-Audrey Larrue-Saint-Jacques is a Canadian comedian and actor from Quebec.

He graduated from the Conservatoire de musique et d'art dramatique du Québec in 2010 and from the École nationale de l'humour in 2014.

He gained popularity with the general public after taking part in the comic series Like-Moi!, which aired between 2015 and 2020 on Télé-Québec. He presented his first solo comedy show, Hélas, ce n'est qu'un spectacle d'humour, in 2017, for which he won the Zoofest first prize the same year.

In 2018 he appeared in Le Combat des livres, advocating for Stéfanie Clermont's Le jeu de la musique.

In 2019, he played the lead role in the film Barbarians of the Bay (Les Barbares de La Malbaie), directed by Vincent Biron. The same year, he played the lead role of Teodore in the web-series Teodore pas de H.

In 2021, he and Thomas Levac launched the comedy podcast Deux Princes.

In 2023, he presented his second comedy show, Enfant du siècle, for which he received two Olivier Awards in 2024 for best comedy show and writer of the year.

== Filmography ==
- 2017: Father and Guns 2 (De père en flic 2): Kev
- 2018: Les Scènes fortuites: Loïc Saulnier
- 2019: Barbarians of the Bay (Les Barbares de La Malbaie): Yves Tanguay
