= Étienne Galloy =

Canadian actor and filmmaker from Quebec

Étienne Galloy is a Canadian actor and filmmaker from Quebec. He is most noted for his performance as Stefie in the 2016 film Prank, for which he received a Prix Iris nomination for Revelation of the Year at the 19th Quebec Cinema Awards in 2017.

He has also appeared in the films Little Brother (Petit frère), Genesis (Genèse), Before We Explode (Avant qu'on explose), Heart Bomb (Une bombe au cœur), Kuessipan, Evergreen$ (Sapin$), Follies (Folichonneries) and Villeneuve: The Rise of a Legend (Villeneuve : l'ascension d'une légende), and the television series No More Parents, Marc-en-Peluche, Karl & Max, GAME(R) and Olivier.

The Marina (La Marina), which he co-directed with Christophe Levac as both actors' directorial debut film, was released in 2020.
