= I'll End Up in Jail =

- Film poster
- French: Je finirai en prison
- Directed by: Alexandre Dostie
- Written by: Alexandre Dostie
- Produced by: Hany Ouichou
- Starring: Martine Francke; Émile Schneider
- Cinematography: Vincent Biron
- Edited by: Stéphane Lafleur
- Music by: Simon Trottier
- Production companies: Art & Essai
- Distributed by: Travelling Distribution
- Release date: July 20, 2019
- Running time: 23 minutes
- Country: Canada
- Language: French

I'll End Up in Jail (French: Je finirai en prison) is a Canadian short drama film, directed by Alexandre Dostie and released in 2019. The film stars Martine Francke as an unhappy housewife who is attempting to escape her life, when she arrives at the scene of a fatal car accident and is convinced by its perpetrator Jelly (Émile Schneider) to help him try to hide the dead body in the forest.

The film premiered at the Guanajuato International Film Festival in July 2019, and had its Canadian premiere at the 2019 Toronto International Film Festival. It subsequently screened in competition at the 2020 Sundance Film Festival, and received an honorable mention in the drama category at the 2020 Aspen Shortsfest.

== Awards ==
The film won several awards at Québec Cinéma's Prend ça court! gala in 2020, including a Best Actress award for Francke.

The film received a Prix Iris nomination for Best Live Action Short Film at the 22nd Quebec Cinema Awards.
