= Laurentia (film) =

2011 Canadian drama film

- French: Laurentie
- Directed by: Mathieu Denis; Simon Lavoie
- Written by: Mathieu Denis; Simon Lavoie
- Produced by: Nancy Grant; Sylvain Corbeil; Pascal Bascaron
- Starring: Emmanuel Schwartz; Jade Hassouné
- Cinematography: Nicolas Canniccioni
- Edited by: Mathieu Denis
- Production company: Metafilms
- Distributed by: Funfilm Distribution
- Release date: July 3, 2011 (KVIFF)
- Running time: 118 minutes
- Country: Canada
- Language: French

Laurentia (French: Laurentie) is a Canadian drama film, directed by Mathieu Denis and Simon Lavoie and released in 2011. A meditation on Québécois identity which draws its title from the philosophical concept of Laurentie that was an early precursor to the contemporary Quebec sovereignty movement, the film stars Emmanuel Schwartz as Louis Desprès, an audiovisual technician in Montreal who sinks into a malaise of depression and identity crisis as he becomes increasingly distrustful and suspicious of his new anglophone immigrant neighbour Jay Kashyap (Jade Hassouné).

The film's cast also includes Eugénie Beaudry, Guillaume Cyr, Martin Boily and Simon Gfeller.

The film was screened at the 2011 Cannes Film Market as part of Telefilm Canada's annual Perspectives Canada program, and had its public premiere at the 46th Karlovy Vary International Film Festival. It had its Canadian premiere at the 2011 Festival du nouveau cinéma.

The film faced some controversy for a scene which featured the lead character masturbating.

== Awards ==
The film won the award for Best International Film at the 2012 Raindance Film Festival, and Denis and Lavoie won the award for best director at the 2012 Polar Lights film festival in Saint Petersburg.
