= Eric K. Boulianne =

Canadian actor

Eric K. Boulianne is a Canadian screenwriter and actor from Quebec. He is most noted as the writer of the film Before We Explode (Avant qu'on explose), for which he was a Prix Iris nominee for Best Screenplay at the 21st Quebec Cinema Awards in 2019, and as cowriter with Stéphane Lafleur of the film Viking, for which they received a Canadian Screen Award nomination for Best Original Screenplay at the 11th Canadian Screen Awards in 2023.

He has also directed a number of short films. In 2024 he entered production on Follies (Folichonneries), his feature-length directorial debut, which premiered at the 78th Locarno Film Festival.

He received two Canadian Screen Award nominations at the 12th Canadian Screen Awards in 2024, in the categories of Best Adapted Screenplay for The Dishwasher (Le Plongeur), and Best Performance in a Live Action Short Drama for Making Babies (Faire un enfant).

== Filmography ==
=== Writer ===
- Little Brother (Petit frère) - 2014
- Prank - 2016
- Father and Guns 2 (De père en flic 2) - 2017
- Before We Explode (Avant qu'on explose) - 2019
- Compulsive Liar (Menteur) - 2019
- Heart Bomb (Une bombe au cœur) - 2019
- Barbarians of the Bay (Les Barbares de la Malbaie) - 2019
- Viking - 2022
- The Dishwasher (Le Plongeur) - 2023
- Farador - 2023
- Making Babies (Faire un enfant) - 2023
- Follies (Folichonneries) - 2025
- Compulsive Liar 2 (Menteuse) - 2025
- Bon Cop, Bad Cop - 2026

=== Actor ===
- L'Affaire Dumont - 2012
- Little Brother (Petit frère) - 2014
- Prank - 2016
- The Fall of Sparta (La Chute de Sparte) - 2018
- Heart Bomb (Une bombe au cœur) - 2019
- A Brother's Love (La femme de mon frère) - 2019
- There Are No False Undertakings (Il n'y a pas de faux métier) - 2020
- Farador - 2023
- Making Babies (Faire un enfant) - 2023
- Peak Everything (Amour Apocalypse) - 2025
- Follies (Folichonneries) - 2025
- Bon Cop, Bad Cop - 2026

=== Director ===
- Le cul des autres - 2011
- Bubblegum Champs (Champions gomme-balloune) - 2011
- Montréal Zombies - 2012
- Les Royaumes de Kromaki - 2013
- De Borst - 2013
- Fireman - 2014
- Making Babies (Faire un enfant) - 2023
- Follies (Folichonneries) - 2025
