= Julianne Côté =

Canadian actress

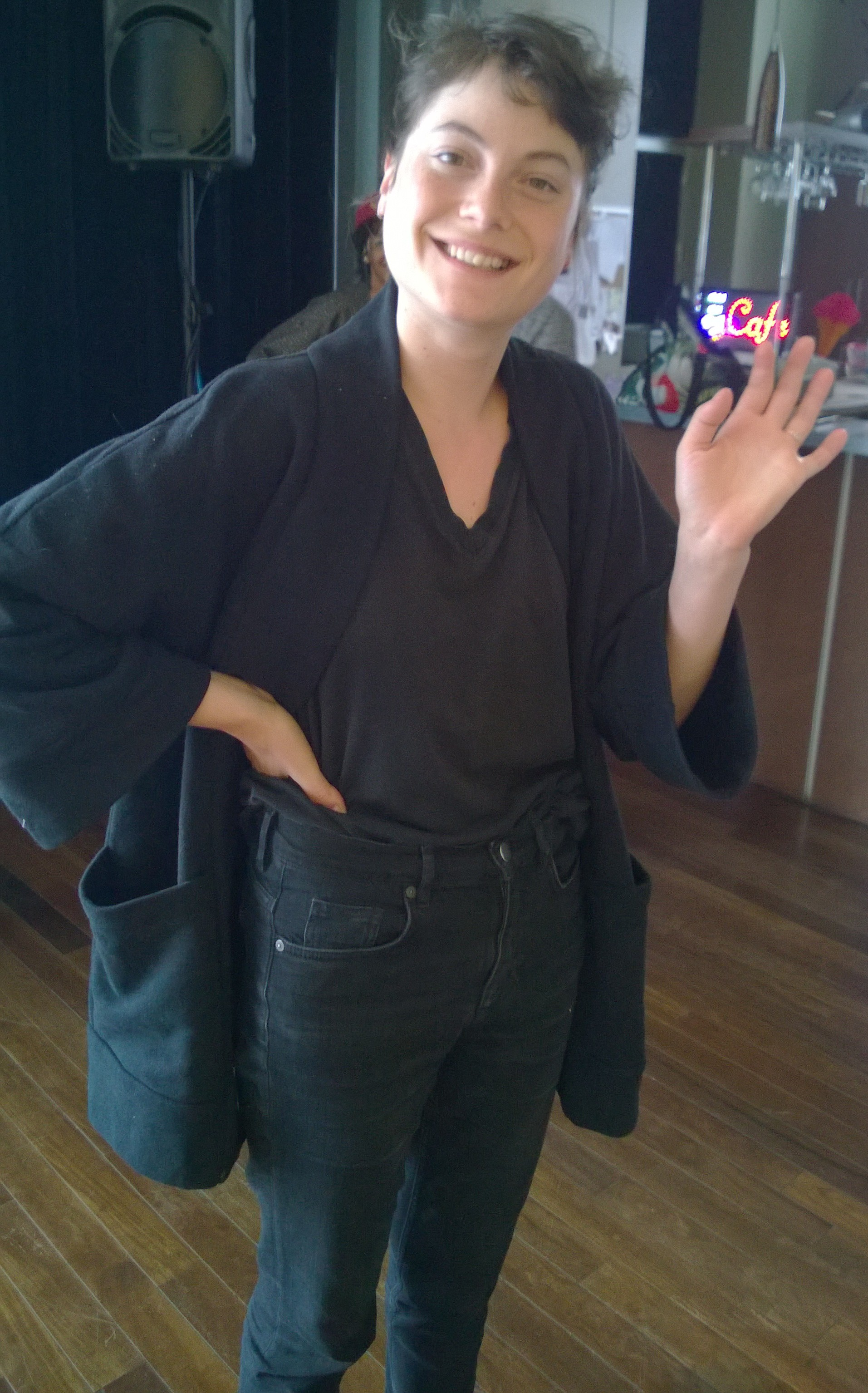
- Côte in 2017
- Born: May 7, 1990 (age 35)
- Occupation: actress
- Years active: 2003–present
- Known for: You're Sleeping Nicole

Julianne Côté (born May 7, 1990) is a Canadian film and television actress, best known for her Canadian Screen Award-nominated performance in the 2014 film You're Sleeping Nicole (Tu dors Nicole).

Her other roles have included the television series Ramdam, Les étoiles filantes, Grande Ourse, Nos étés, Virginie and The Night Logan Woke Up (La nuit où Laurier Gaudreault s'est réveillé), and the films Bittersweet Memories (Ma vie en cinémascope), The Ring, Sarah Prefers to Run (Sarah préfère la course), Mad Dog Labine, Before We Explode (Avant qu'on explose) and Where Souls Go (Où vont les âmes?).
