= Just Me and You (2019 film) =

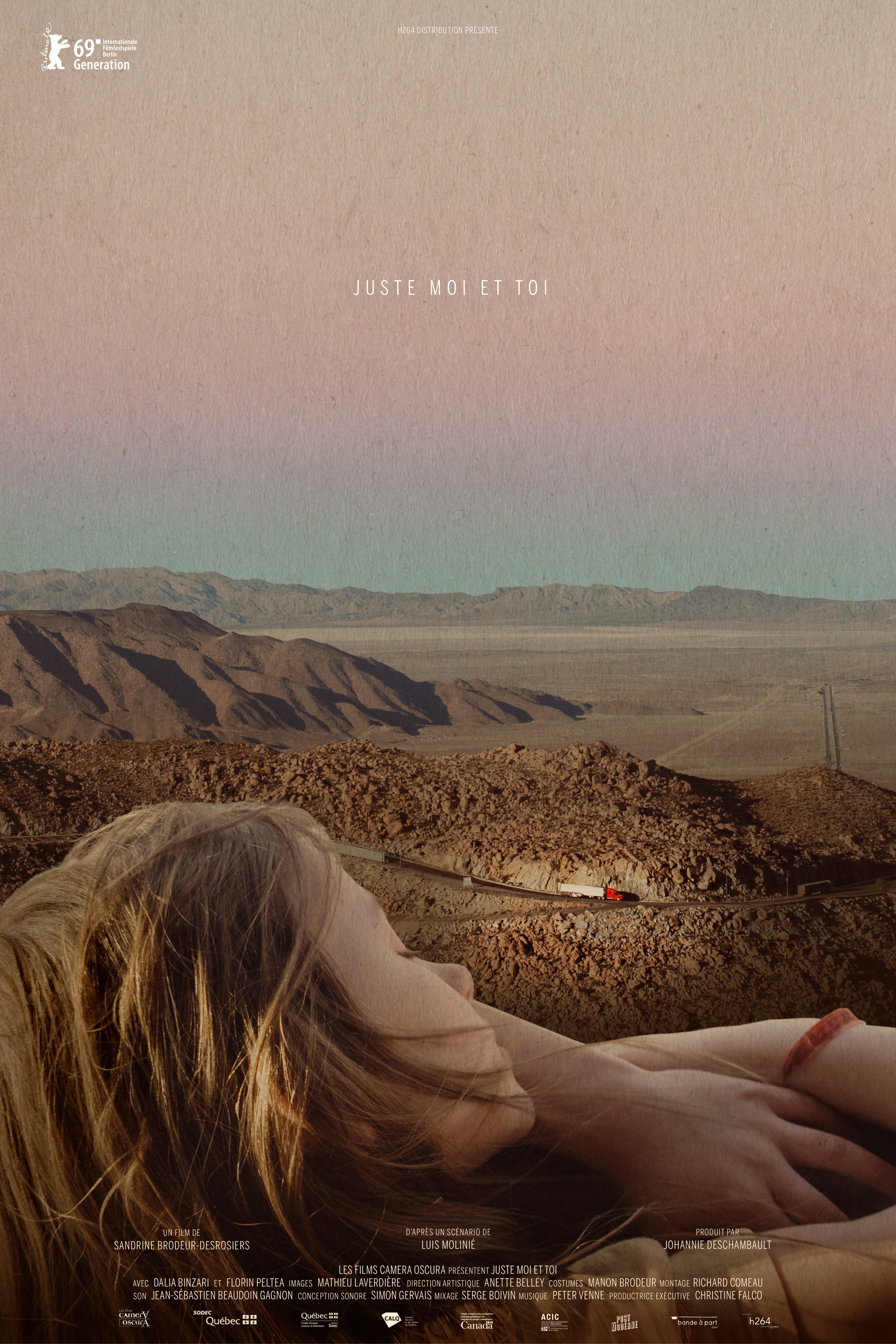
- French: Juste moi et toi
- Directed by: Sandrine Brodeur-Desrosiers
- Written by: Luis Molinié
- Produced by: Johannie Deschambault
- Starring: Florin Peltea; Dalia Binzari
- Cinematography: Mathieu Laverdière
- Edited by: Richard Comeau
- Music by: Peter Venne
- Production company: Les Films Camera Oscura
- Distributed by: H264 Distribution
- Release date: 11 February 2019 (Berlin)
- Running time: 22 minutes
- Country: Canada
- Languages: French & Romanian

Just Me and You (French: Juste moi et toi) is a Canadian short drama film, directed by Sandrine Brodeur-Desrosiers and released in 2019. The film centres on eight-year-old Eva and her father going on a Montreal to Mexico road trip aboard an 18-wheeler.

== Awards ==
The film premiered at the 69th Berlin International Film Festival, where it won the Crystal Bear for Best Short Film (Kplus). It won several awards at other film festivals, including the Best Narrative Short award at the Hamptons International Film Festival, the Grand National Prize at Regard film festival in Saguenay, and the award for Best Editing at the Sapporo International Short Film Festival.

The film received a Canadian Screen Award nomination for Best Live Action Short Drama at the 8th Canadian Screen Awards, and won the Prix Iris for Best Live Action Short Film at the 22nd Quebec Cinema Awards.
