= Hany Ouichou =

- Born: Montreal, Canada
- Occupation: Film producer
- Years active: 2009-...
- Notable work: Ceux qui font les révolutions à moitié n’ont fait que se creuser un tombeau, Mutants, Folichonneries, Je finirai en prison

Hany Ouichou is a Canadian film producer. He co-founded the production company Art & Essai with Mathieu Denis in 2012, and has been a producer and artistic director at La Coop Vidéo de Montréal since 2020.

In 2016, he received the inaugural Canadian Media Producers Association (CMPA) Emerging Producer Award at the Toronto International Film Festival (TIFF), selected by a jury chaired by Robert Lantos. The association cited his “unique creative vision and impressive talents”. He took part in Berlinale Talents in 2015.

== Career ==
He produced Those Who Make Revolution Halfway Only Dig Their Own Graves (Ceux qui font les révolutions à moitié n’ont fait que se creuser un tombeau, 2016), directed by Mathieu Denis and Simon Lavoie, which premiered in the Platform competition at TIFF 2016 and won the festival’s award for Best Canadian Film. The film was named to TIFF’s Canada’s Top Ten, received a Special Mention in the Generation 14plus section of the 67th Berlin International Film Festival, and was a Canadian Screen Award nominee for Best Picture at the 5th Canadian Screen Awards in 2017.

His other feature credits include Prank (2016), directed by Vincent Biron, which premiered in the Critics’ Week at the Venice Film Festival and won the Audience Award at the Festival du nouveau cinéma; Bungalow; and Adventures in the Land of Asha (Jules au pays d’Asha, 2023), a children’s film directed by Sophie Farkas Bolla, which won the Grand Prix de Montréal at the Montreal International Children’s Film Festival and the environmental film prize at the Giffoni Film Festival in 2023.

The documentary Paul (2025), directed by Denis Côté, premiered in the Panorama section of the 75th Berlin International Film Festival and won the DGC Special Jury Prize for Canadian Feature Documentary at the Hot Docs Canadian International Documentary Festival.

Follies (Folichonneries, 2025), directed by Éric K. Boulianne, premiered in the Filmmakers of the Present competition at the 78th Locarno Film Festival, was named to Canada’s Top Ten, and won the Prix Gilles-Carle at the 2026 Rendez-vous Québec Cinéma. The Cost of Heaven (Gagne ton ciel, 2025), directed by Mathieu Denis, premiered at the 2025 Toronto International Film Festival, won the award for best French-language feature at the Cinéfest Sudbury International Film Festival and the Playback Prize for Best Film at the 2026 Kingston Canadian Film Festival. Both films were nominated for Best Motion Picture at the 14th Canadian Screen Awards in 2026, where Follies received eight nominations and The Cost of Heaven two.

Among his short films, Mutants (2016), directed by Alexandre Dostie, won the Best Canadian Short Film award at TIFF and the Canadian Screen Award for Best Live Action Short Drama at the 5th Canadian Screen Awards, where Wild Skin (La Peau sauvage) was also a nominee in the same category. I’ll End Up in Jail (Je finirai en prison, 2019), also directed by Dostie, screened in competition at the 2020 Sundance Film Festival. In 2025, Pidikwe, directed by Caroline Monnet and produced through La Coop Vidéo de Montréal, premiered in the Forum Expanded section of the 75th Berlin International Film Festival, and Boa, directed by Dostie, had its world premiere in the Pardi di Domani international competition at the 78th Locarno Film Festival.

== Filmography ==
- Ceux qui font les révolutions à moitié n’ont fait que se creuser un tombeau, 2016
- Prank, 2016
- Mutants, 2016
- La peau sauvage, 2016
- Je finirai en prison, 2019
- Bungalow, 2022
- Jules au pays d’Asha, 2023
- Paul, 2025
- Folichonneries, 2025
- Gagne ton ciel, 2025
- Pidikwe, 2025
- Boa, 2025

== Awards & Nominations ==
- Hany Ouichou, Emerging Producer Award, Canadian Media Producers Association (CMPA), Toronto International Film Festival (TIFF) 2016
