= Before We Explode =

2019 Canadian sex comedy film by Rémi St-Michel

- Film poster
- French: Avant qu'on explose
- Directed by: Rémi St-Michel
- Written by: Eric K. Boulianne
- Produced by: Christian Larouche
- Starring: Étienne Galloy; Amadou Madani Tall; William Monette; Julianne Côté; Monia Chokri; Brigitte Poupart; Antoine Olivier Pilon; Rose-Marie Perreault
- Cinematography: Mathieu Laverdière
- Edited by: Jean-François Bergeron
- Music by: Peter Venne
- Production company: Christal Films
- Distributed by: Les Films Séville
- Release date: February 28, 2019 (RVQC)
- Running time: 108 minutes
- Country: Canada
- Language: French

Before We Explode (French: Avant qu'on explose) is a Canadian sex comedy film, directed by Rémi St-Michel and released in 2019. The film stars Étienne Galloy as Pier-Luc, a teenager who fears that the diplomatic war of words between Donald Trump and Kim Jong-un is going to escalate into World War III, and embarks on a quest to lose his virginity before the world blows up.

The film's cast also includes Amadou Madani Tall, William Monette, Julianne Côté, Monia Chokri, Brigitte Poupart, Antoine Olivier Pilon, Laurie Babin and Rose-Marie Perreault.

The film premiered in February 2019 at the Rendez-vous Québec Cinéma. It received two Prix Iris nominations at the 21st Quebec Cinema Awards, for Best Screenplay (Eric K. Boulianne) and Best Original Music (Peter Venne).

== Cast ==
- Étienne Galloy as Pier-Luc
- Amadou Madani Tall as Hubert
- William Monette as Samuel
- Julianne Côté as Maude
- Monia Chokri as Psy
- Brigitte Poupart as Mère à Quick
- Antoine Olivier Pilon as Little
- Rose-Marie Perreault as Cynthia Desmeules
