= Rémi St-Michel =

Canadian film director from Quebec

Rémi St-Michel is a Canadian film director from Quebec. He is most noted for his short films Little Brother (Petit frère), which was a Canadian Screen Award nominee for Best Live Action Short Drama at the 3rd Canadian Screen Awards in 2015, and Heart Bomb (Une bombe au cœur), which was a Prix Iris nominee for Best Live Action Short Film at the 22nd Quebec Cinema Awards in 2020.

His debut feature film, Before We Explode (Avant qu'on explose), was released in 2019. He followed up in 2026 with Toy Gun Bandit (Faux gun bandit), which premiered at the 2026 Toronto International Film Festival.
