= Mathieu Denis =

Canadian screenwriter and film director

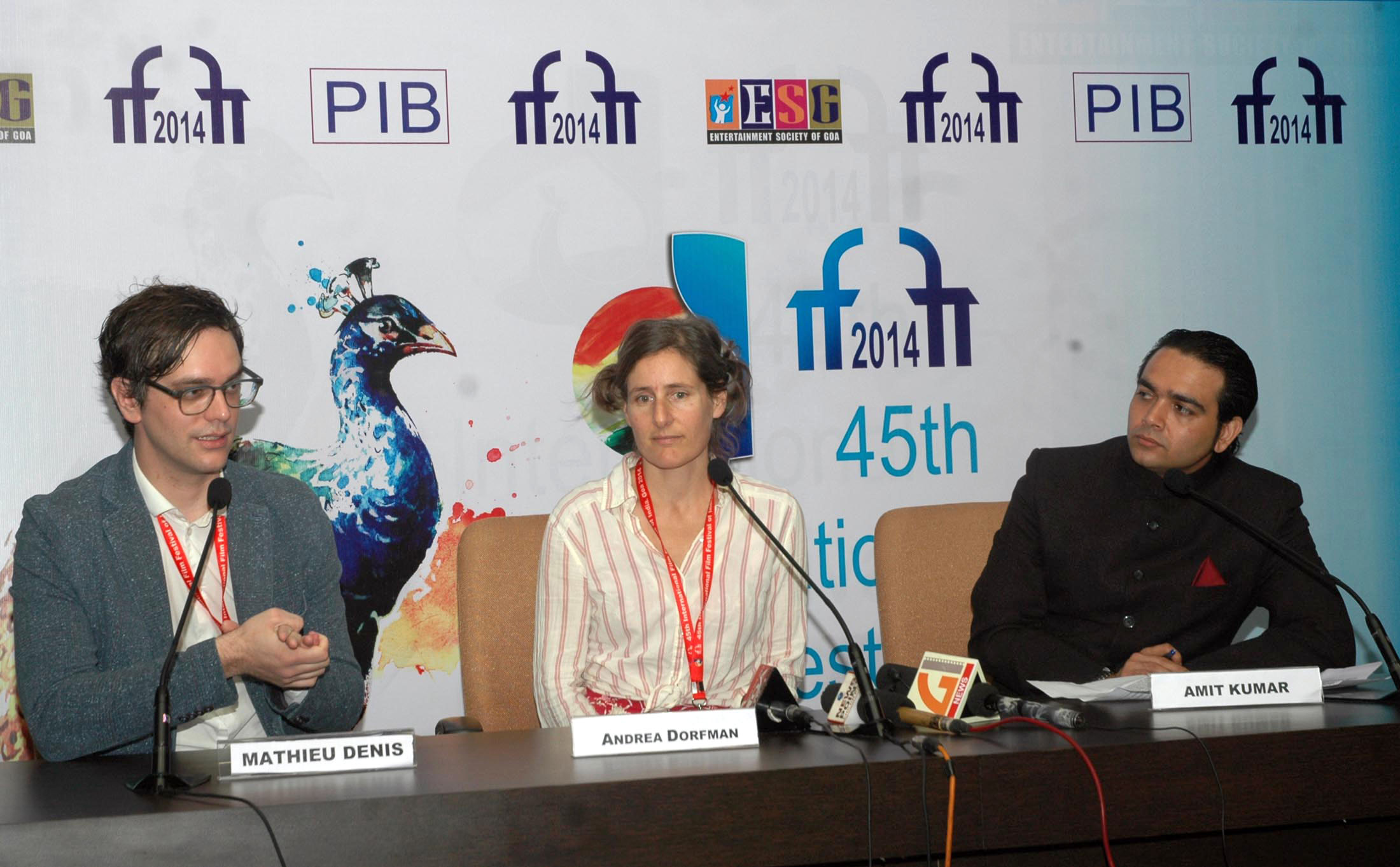
- Born: Canada
- Occupations: Screenwriter, film director

Mathieu Denis is a Canadian screenwriter and film director from Quebec. He is best known for his films Corbo, which was a Canadian Screen Award and Quebec Cinema Award nominee for Best Picture in 2016, and Those Who Make Revolution Halfway Only Dig Their Own Graves (Ceux qui font les révolutions à moitié n'ont fait que se creuser un tombeau), which won the award for Best Canadian Film at the 2016 Toronto International Film Festival.

Denis made several short films before his feature film debut, Laurentia (Laurentie), in 2011. The most noted of his short films was Code 13, which was named to TIFF's annual year-end Canada's Top Ten list in 2007.

Most but not all of his films have been made in collaboration with Simon Lavoie.

== Filmography ==
- The Silence Will Echo Us (Le silence nous fera écho) - 2006
- Code 13 - 2007
- Laurentia (Laurentie) - 2011
- Corbo - 2014
- Those Who Make Revolution Halfway Only Dig Their Own Graves (Ceux qui font les révolutions à moitié n'ont fait que se creuser un tombeau) - 2016
- The Cost of Heaven (Gagne ton ciel) - 2025
