= List of Canadian films of 2012 =

This is a list of Canadian films which were released in 2012:

Title	Director	Cast	Genre	Notes	Ref
A Drop of Love	Golam Mustofa	Marcel Legault, Sabreena Ghaffar Siddiqui, Jarvis Alam, Simon Henri	Romantic comedy		
L'Affaire Dumont	Daniel Grou	Marc-André Grondin, Geneviève Brouillette, Marilyn Castonguay	Drama		
All That You Possess (Tout ce que tu possèdes)	Bernard Émond	Patrick Drolet, Gilles Renaud, Isabelle Vincent	Drama		
Alphée of the Stars (Alphée des étoiles)	Hugo Latulippe	Hugo Latulippe, Laure Waridel	Documentary		
Antiviral	Brandon Cronenberg	Caleb Landry Jones, Sarah Gadon, Malcolm McDowell	Horror	Made with U.S. financing	
Before My Heart Falls (Avant que mon cœur bascule)	Sébastien Rose	Sophie Lorain, Sébastien Ricard, Alexis Martin	Drama		
Bestiaire	Denis Côté		Documentary		
Beyond the Walls (Hors les murs)	David Lambert	Guillaume Gouix, Matila Malliarakis, Mélissa Désormeaux-Poulin, David Salles, Flonja Kodheli	Drama		
Blackbird	Jason Buxton	Connor Jessup, Alexia Fast, Jeremy Akerman	Drama		
The Bossé Empire (L'Empire Bossé)	Claude Desrosiers	Guy A. Lepage, Claude Legault, Élise Guilbault	Comedy		
The Boxing Girls of Kabul	Ariel Nasr		National Film Board Documentary	Best short documentary, 1st Canadian Screen Awards	
Bydlo	Patrick Bouchard		Animated short		
Camera Shy	Mark Sawers	Nicolas Wright, Gerard Plunkett, David Nykl, Lara Gilchrist, Stephen Lobo	Comedy		
Camion	Rafaël Ouellet	Julien Poulin, Patrice Dubois, Stéphane Breton	Comedy, drama	Prix Jutra – Actor (Poulin), Musical Score	
Catimini	Nathalie Saint-Pierre	Émilie Bierre	Drama		
Cosmopolis	David Cronenberg	Robert Pattinson, Jay Baruchel, Juliette Binoche, Samantha Morton, Emily Hampshire, Sara Gorden, Paul Giamatti		Original Score, Song-1st Canadian Screen Awards; Canada-Italy-France-Portugal co-production	
Chained	Jennifer Lynch	Vincent D'Onofrio, Julia Ormond	Thriller	Direct to DVD	
Crackin' Down Hard	Mike Clattenburg	Nicolas Wright, Yoursie Thomas	Short comedy		
Crimes of Mike Recket	Bruce Sweeney	Nicholas Lea, Gabrielle Rose, Agam Darshi, Jillian Fargey	Drama		
Demoni	Theodore Ushev		Animated short		
The Disappeared	Shandi Mitchell	Billy Campbell, Shawn Doyle, Brian Downey	Drama		
East Hastings Pharmacy	Antoine Bourges	Shauna Hansen	Docufiction		
Edmond Was a Donkey (Edmond était un âne)	Franck Dion		Animated short		
Ésimésac	Luc Picard	Nicola-Frank Vachon, Marie Brassard, Isabel Richler, Luc Picard, Gildor Roy		Prix Jutra – Costumes	
Exile (Exil)	Charles-Olivier Michaud	Francis Cleophat, Paul Doucet, Julie Le Breton, Stephen McHattie	Drama		
Fair Sex (Les Manèges humains)	Martin Laroche	Marie-Evelyne Lessard, Marc-André Brunet, Normand Daoust	Drama		
First Snow (Première neige)	Michaël Lalancette	François Bernier, David Boutin, Karine Gonthier-Hyndman, Benoît Gouin, Louise Latraverse, Marie-Laurence Moreau, Noémie Yelle	Short drama		
For Dorian	Rodrigo Barriuso	Ron Lea, Dylan Harman	Short drama		
Frost	Jeremy Ball	Emily Piggford	Short drama		
The Fruit Hunters	Yung Chang	Bill Pullman	Documentary produced with the National Film Board and CBC-TV	Inspired by the book by Adam Gollner; made for TV.	
Goon	Michael Dowse	Seann William Scott, Liev Schreiber, Jay Baruchel	Comedy		
Herd Leader (Chef de meute)	Chloé Robichaud	Ève Duranceau	Short drama		
Here and the Great Elsewhere (Le Grand ailleurs et le petit ici)	Michèle Lemieux		Animated short		
Herman's House	Angad Singh Bhalla	Jackie Sumell, Herman Wallace	Documentary		
High Chicago	Alfons Adetuyi	Colin Salmon, Kevin Hanchard, Karen LeBlanc, Sebastian Pigott	Drama	Direct to DVD	
Home Again	Sudz Sutherland	Lyriq Bent, Stephan James	Drama		
In No Particular Order	Terry Miles & Kristine Cofsky	Kristine Cofsky, Sonja Bennett, Ben Cotton, Mike Dopud, Stephen Lobo, Carmen Lavigne	Comedy-drama		
Ina Litovski	Anaïs Barbeau-Lavalette, André Turpin	Marine Johnson, Geneviève Alarie	Short drama		
Inch'Allah	Anaïs Barbeau-Lavalette	Evelyne Brochu, Sivan Levy, Sabrina Ouazani	Drama	Canada-France co-production	
Indie Game: The Movie	James Swirsky & Lisanne Pajot		Documentary		
Inescapable	Ruba Nadda	Alexander Siddig, Joshua Jackson, Marisa Tomei, Oded Fehr, Fadia Nadda	Political drama	Canada-South Africa co-production	
Inner Worlds Outer Worlds	Daniel Schmidt & Patrick Sweeney		Documentary	Winner, Award of Excellence, Canada International Film Festival	
I, Pet Goat II	Louis Lefebvre		Animated short	Ocelot Robot Film Festival 2012 - Best Short Film	
Just As I Remember	Andrew Moir		Documentary		
Kaspar	Diane Obomsawin	Mathew Mackay, Gabriel Lessard, Kathleen Fee, Arthur Holden	Animated short		
Keep a Modest Head (Ne crâne pas sois modeste)	Deco Dawson		Short documentary		
Karakara	Claude Gagnon	Gabriel Arcand, Youki Kudoh	Drama		
Krivina	Igor Drljaca	Jasmin Geljo, Goran Slavkovic	Drama	Toronto International Film Festival world premiere	
Last Chance	Paul-Émile d'Entremont		National Film Board Documentary		
Laurence Anyways	Xavier Dolan	Melvil Poupaud, Suzanne Clément, Nathalie Baye	Drama	TIFF – Best Canadian Feature Film; Cannes Film Festival – Queer Palm, Un Certain Regard, Best Actress (Clément)	
The Lesser Blessed	Anita Doron	Joel Evans, Chloe Rose, Kiowa Gordon, Benjamin Bratt	Drama		
Let the Daylight Into the Swamp	Jeffrey St. Jules		National Film Board 3D short		
Letters from Pyongyang	Jason Lee	Jason Lee, Young Tae Lee	Documentary		
A Little Bit Zombie	Casey Walker	Kristopher Turner, Crystal Lowe, Shawn Roberts, Kristen Hager, Stephen McHattie	Horror comedy		
Liverpool	Manon Briand	Stéphanie Lapointe, Charles-Alexandre Dubé	Comedy/crime		
Lowlife	Seth Smith	Chik White	Drama/horror		
Margarita	Laurie Colbert, Dominique Cardona	Nicola Correia-Damude, Patrick McKenna, Christine Horne, Maya Ritter	Comedy-drama		
Mars et Avril	Martin Villeneuve	Jacques Languirand, Caroline Dhavernas, Paul Ahmarani, Robert Lepage	Sci-fi fantasy		
Midnight's Children	Deepa Mehta	Satya Bhabha, Shriya Saran, Seema Biswas, Siddarth, Rajat Kappor, Rahul Bose	Drama	A Canada-U.K. co-production based on the novel by Salman Rushdie.	
Mort subite d'un homme-théâtre	Jean-Claude Coulbois		Documentary		
Moving Day	Mike Clattenburg	Will Sasso, Gabriel Hogan, Jonny Harris, Charlie Murphy, Victor Garber, Gabrielle Miller	Comedy		
My Awkward Sexual Adventure	Sean Garrity	Jonas Chernick, Emily Hampshire, Sarah Manninen	Comedy-drama		
My Real Life (Ma vie réelle)	Magnus Isacsson	Alexandre Bryson, Don Karnage, Danny Raymond, Michael Stiverne, Mikerson Stiverne	Documentary		
The Mystery of Mazo de la Roche	Maya Gallus	Severn Thompson, Deborah Hay	Docudrama		
The Near Future (Le futur proche)	Sophie Goyette	Patrice Berthomier	Short drama		
Old Stock	James Genn	Noah Reid, Melanie Leishman, Danny Wells, Meghan Heffern	Comedy-drama		
Omertà	Luc Dionne	Michel Côté, Rachelle Lefevre, Patrick Huard, René Angélil, Stéphane Rousseau	Crime drama	Feature film sequel to the 1990s drama series Omertà	
Over My Dead Body	Brigitte Poupart	Dave St-Pierre	Documentary		
Payback	Jennifer Baichwal	Margaret Atwood, Raj Patel	National Film Board Documentary	Based on the book Payback: Debt and the Shadow Side of Wealth	
The Pee-Wee 3D: The Winter That Changed My Life (Les Pee-Wee 3D)	Éric Tessier	Antoine Olivier Pilon, Alice Morel-Michaud, Julie Le Breton, Guy Nadon	Sports comedy-drama		
The People of the Kattawapiskak River	Alanis Obomsawin		National Film Board Documentary	Attawapiskat housing crisis	
Resident Evil: Retribution	Paul W. S. Anderson	Milla Jovovich, Sienna Guillory, Kevin Durand, Colin Salmon	Horror	Canada-German co-production; Golden Reel Award; shot in 3D	
Rufus	Dave Schultz	Rory J. Saper, Kim Coates, David James Elliott, Kelly Rowan, Merritt Patterson, Richard Harmon	Drama/horror		
The Secret Disco Revolution	Jamie Kastner		Documentary		
She Said Boom: The Story of Fifth Column	Kevin Hegge		Documentary	Profile of the queer punk band Fifth Column	
Silence Is Gold (Le Prix des mots)	Julien Fréchette	Alain Deneault	Documentary		
Silent Hill: Revelation 3D	Michael J. Bassett	Adelaide Clemens, Kit Harington, Deborah Kara Unger, Martin Donovan. Malcolm McDowell, Carrie-Anne Moss, Sean Bean	Horror	Canada-France co-production made with U.S. financing	
Small Blind (La Mise à l'aveugle)	Simon Galiero	Micheline Bernard, Christine Beaulieu, Julien Poulin	Drama		
Still Mine	Michael McGowan	James Cromwell, Geneviève Bujold, Jonathan Potts	Drama	Toronto International Film Festival screening only; general release in 2013. Actor (Cromwell)-1st Canadian Screen Awards.	
Status Quo? The Unfinished Business of Feminism in Canada	Karen Cho		National Film Board Documentary	Best documentary, Whistler Film Festival	
Stories We Tell	Sarah Polley	Rebecca Jenkins, Sarah Polley	National Film Board Documentary	Premiered at 69th Venice International Film Festival; Documentary-1st Canadian Screen Awards; TFCA – Best Canadian Film	
The Torrent (Le Torrent)	Simon Lavoie	Victor Andrés Trelles Turgeon, Dominique Quesnel, Laurence Leboeuf	Drama		
Tower	Kazik Radwanski	Derek Bogart, Nicole Fairbairn, Deborah Sawyer	Drama		
Two Hands to Mouth	Michael DeCarlo	Art Hindle and an ensemble cast	Dark comedy drama		
The Valley of Tears (La Vallée des larmes)	Maryanne Zéhil		Drama		
Vampire Dog (Le Chien Vampire)	Geoff Anderson	Collin MacKechnie, Julia Sarah Stone, Norm MacDonald, Amy Matysio, Ron Pederson, Jodi Sadowsky	Comedy		
Vanishing Point	Stephen A. Smith & Julia Szucs	Navarana K'avigak	National Film Board Documentary		
War Witch (Rebelle)	Kim Nguyen	Rachel Mwanza, Serge Kanyinda	Drama about child soldiers	Academy Award nominee for Best Foreign-Language Film	
We Were Children	Tim Wolochatiuk		Documentary produced with the National Film Board	Documenting experiences in the residential school system	
Where I Am (Là où je suis)	Myriam Magassouba	Virginie Léger, Marie Brassard	Short drama		
Wintergreen (Paparmane)	Joëlle Desjardins Paquette	Steve Laplante, Sophie Desmarais	Short comedy-drama		
With Jeff (Avec Jeff, à moto)	Marie-Ève Juste	Laury Verdieu, Liridon Rashiti	Short drama		
The World Before Her	Nisha Pahuja		Documentary		

== See also ==
- 2012 in Canada
- 2012 in Canadian television
