= List of Canadian films of 2011 =

This is a list of Canadian films which were released in 2011:

| Title | Director | Cast | Genre | Notes |
|---|---|---|---|---|
| 75 Watts | John Cullen | Matt Giordano | Documentary | |
| 388 Arletta Avenue | Randall Cole | Nick Stahl, Mia Kirshner, Devon Sawa | Horror | |
| About Her | Phyllis Ellis | | Documentary | |
| Afghan Luke | Mike Clattenburg | Nick Stahl, Nicolas Wright, Stephen Lobo, Vik Sahay | Comedy drama | |
| Amy George | Yonah Lewis and Calvin Thomas | Gabriel del Castillo Mullaly | Coming-of-age drama | |
| At Night, They Dance (La Nuit, elles dansent) | Isabelle Lavigne & Stéphane Thibault | | Documentary | Genie Award – Documentary |
| Bail Enforcers | Patrick McBrearty | Trish Stratus | Crime drama | Direct to DVD |
| Beauty Day | Jay Cheel | | Documentary | |
| Blind Spot (Angle mort) | Dominic James | Karine Vanasse, Sébastien Huberdeau, Sophie Cadieux | Thriller | |
| A Bottle in the Gaza Sea | Thierry Binisti | Agathe Bonitzer, Hiam Abbass, Salim Dau, Riff Cohen | Drama | Canada-France-Israel co-production based on a novel by Valérie Zenatti |
| Breakaway | Robert Lieberman | Vinay Virmani, Russell Peters, Akshay Kumar | Hockey drama | Canada-India co-production |
| BumRush | Michel Jetté | Emmanuel Auger | Crime drama | |
| Café de Flore | Jean-Marc Vallée | Kevin Parent, Vanessa Paradis, Hélène Florent, Evelyne Brochu | Drama | |
| The Captains | William Shatner | William Shatner | Documentary | |
| Choke | Michelle Latimer | | Animated short | |
| Citizen Gangster | Nathan Morlando | Scott Speedman, Kelly Reilly, Kevin Durand | biodrama | About the exploits of notorious Toronto bank robber, Edwin Boyd |
| Cloudburst | Thom Fitzgerald | Olympia Dukakis, Brenda Fricker | Drama | Made with U.S. financing |
| Collaborator | Martin Donovan | Martin Donovan, David Morse, Olivia Williams, Melissa Auf der Maur, Katherine Helmond | Drama | Made with U.S. financing |
| Coteau Rouge | André Forcier | Roy Dupuis, Céline Bonnier | Comedy | |
| A Dangerous Method | David Cronenberg | Viggo Mortensen, Michael Fassbender, Keira Knightley, Vincent Cassel | Historical/Drama | Canada-U.K.-German-Switzerland co-production |
| Derailments (Deragliamenti) | Chelsea McMullan | Milo Manara | Documentary | |
| Donovan's Echo | Jim Cliffe | Danny Glover, Bruce Greenwood, Natasha Calls, Sonja Bennett | Thriller, drama | |
| Doppelgänger Paul | Dylan Akio Smith, Kris Elgstrand | Brad Dryborough, Tygh Runyan, Arabella Bushnell, Ben Cotton | Comedy | |
| Doubles with Slight Pepper | Ian Harnarine | Sanjiv Boodhu, Errol Sitahal | Short drama | |
| Down the Road Again | Don Shebib | Doug McGrath, Kathleen Robertson, Anthony Lemke, Jayne Eastwood | Drama | A sequel to the 1970 film, Goin' Down the Road. |
| East End Forever (L'Est pour toujours) | Carole Laganière | | Documentary | |
| Encounters (Rencontre) | Mélanie Carrier, Olivier Higgins | | Documentary | |
| Familiar Grounds (En terrains connus) | Stéphane Lafleur | Francis La Haye, Fanny Mallette | Drama | |
| Family Portrait in Black and White | Julia Ivanova | Olga Nenya | Documentary | |
| Fear of Water (La Peur de l'eau) | Gabriel Pelletier | Pierre-François Legendre, Brigitte Pogonat | Drama | |
| For the Love of God (Pour l'amour de dieu) | Micheline Lanctôt | Madeleine Péloquin, Ariane Legault, Geneviève Bujold | | Prix Jutra – Costumes |
| French Immersion | Kevin Tierney | Karine Vanasse, Pascale Bussières, Robert Charlebois, Martha Burns, Colm Feore | Comedy | |
| French Kiss | Sylvain Archambault | Claude Legault, Céline Bonnier | Romantic comedy | |
| Funkytown | Daniel Roby | Patrick Huard, Raymond Bouchard, Geneviève Brouillette, Justin Chatwin, Paul Doucet, Sarah Mutch | Drama | |
| The Fuse: Or How I Burned Simon Bolivar (Kako sam Zapalio Simona Bolivara) | Igor Drljaca | | Documentary | |
| Gerry | Alain DesRochers | Mario Saint-Amand, Capucine Delaby | Biodrama | Biopic about singer Gérald Boulet from the Quebec band Offenbach; Prix Jutra – Hair, Makeup |
| The Girl in the White Coat | Darrell Wasyk | Pascale Monpetit | Drama | Based on The Overcoat by Nikolai Gogol. |
| Grave Encounters | The Vicious Brothers | Sean Rogerson | Sci-fi horror | |
| The Guantanamo Trap | Thomas Wallner | | Documentary | |
| The Happiness of Others (Le Bonheur des autres) | Jean-Philippe Pearson | Michel Barrette, Louise Portal, Marc-André Grondin, Julie Le Breton | Comedy drama | |
| Hellacious Acres: The Case of John Glass | Pat Tremblay | Navin Pratap, Jamie Abrams, Laurent Lecompte, Francis Dubois | Science fiction | |
| Henry | Yan England | Gérard Poirier, Louise Laprade, Marie Tifo, Hubert Lemire, Ariane-Li Simard-Côté | Short drama | |
| Hidden 3D | Antoine Thomas | Devon Bostick, Jason Blicker | Horror | Canada-Italy co-production |
| Hobo with a Shotgun | Jason Eisener | Ruger Hauer, Gregory Smith, Robb Wells, Molly Dunsworth, Brian Downey | Crime thriller | |
| The Hole Story | Richard Desjardins & Robert Monderie | | National Film Board Documentary | |
| Hope | Pedro Pires | Bill Croft, Lucas Silveira | Short drama | |
| If I Should Fall | Brendon Culliton | | Documentary | |
| I'm Yours | Leonard Farlinger | Rossif Sutherland, Karine Vanasse, Don McKellar, Nicholas Campbell | Drama | |
| Inner City (La Cité entre les murs) | Alain Fournier | | Animated short | |
| An Insignificant Harvey | Jeff Kopas | Jordan Prentice, Kristin Adams, Steven McCarthy, Art Hindle | Drama | |
| In Darkness | Agnieszka Holland | Robert Więckiewicz, Benno Fürmann | Drama | Canada-Poland-German co-production; screenplay by David F. Shamoon; Academy Award nominee for Foreign-Language Film |
| Irvine Welsh's Ecstasy | Rob Heydon | Adam Sinclair, Kristin Kreuk, Billy Boyd, Carlo Rota | Black comedy | |
| Keyhole | Guy Maddin | Jason Patric, Isabella Rossellini | Drama | |
| Knockout | Anne Wheeler | Steve Austin, Daniel Magder | Boxing drama | Made with U.S. financing |
| Laurentia (Laurentie) | Mathieu Denis and Simon Lavoie | | Drama | |
| Lost Years: A People's Struggle for Justice | Kenda Gee & Tom Radford | | Documentary | International-award winning documentary for tv and theatrical screening, including multiple Canadian Screen Awards nominations. Winner at the 2011 Guangzhou International Documentary Film Festival. |
| Mesnak | Yves Sioui Durand | Victor Andrés Trelles Turgeon, Ève Ringuette | Drama | |
| Monsieur Lazhar | Philippe Falardeau | Mohamed Fellag, Danielle Proulx, Sophie Nélisse | Drama | Academy Award nominee; TIFF – Best Canadian Feature; TFCA – Best Canadian Film |
| Moon Point | Sean Cisterna | | Drama | |
| The Moth Diaries | Mary Harron | Lily Cole, Scott Speedman, Sarah Bolger | Vampire, Horror | Canada-Ireland co-production |
| The Mountie | S. Wyeth Clarkson | Andrew Walker, Jessica Paré, Earl Pastko | Northern film | |
| Music from the Big House | Bruce McDonald | | Documentary | Rita Chiarelli, an award-winning recording artist, takes a pilgrimage to the birthplace of the blues, Louisiana’s infamous Angola Prison. |
| Muybridge's Strings (Maiburijji no ito) | Kōji Yamamura | | Animated short | Canada-Japan coproduction |
| Nuit #1 | Anne Émond | Catherine De Léan, Dimitri Storoge | Drama | Claude Jutra Award |
| Of Events (D'aléas) | Mathieu Tremblay | | Animated short | |
| On the Beat (Sur le rythme) | Charles-Olivier Michaud | Nico Archambault | Romantic comedy | |
| Ora | Philippe Baylaucq | José Navas, choreographer | National Film Board experimental 3D dance film | Filmed with 3D thermography |
| Paula | Dominic-Étienne Simard | | Animated short | |
| Peace Out | Charles Wilkinson | Energy academics, CEOs, activists | Documentary | Winner Special Jury Prize Hot Docs, Most Popular Canadian Documentary VIFF |
| People of a Feather | Joel Heath | | Documentary | |
| Pink Ribbons, Inc. | Léa Pool | | National Film Board Documentary | Explores the Pink ribbon campaign |
| The Private Life of Cinema | Denys Desjardins | | Documentary | |
| Rocky Mountain Express | Stephen Low | | IMAX short | |
| Roller Town | Andrew Bush | Mark Little, Kayla Lorette, Evany Rosen, Pat Thornton | Comedy | |
| Romeo Eleven (Roméo Onze) | Ivan Grbovic | Ali Ammar | Drama | |
| La Ronde | Sophie Goyette | Éliane Préfontaine, Hubert Lemire | Short drama | |
| La Run | Demian Fuica | Jason Roy Léveillée, Marc Beaupré, Pierre-Luc Brillant, Nicolas Canuel | Crime drama | |
| The Salesman (Le Vendeur) | Sébastien Pilote | Gilbert Sicotte | Drama | Prix Jutra – Actor (Sicotte) |
| A Sense of Humour (Le Sens de l'humour) | Émile Gaudreault | Michel Côté, Louis-José Houde, Benoît Brière | Comedy | |
| Son of the Sunshine | Ryan Ward | Ryan Ward | Supernatural drama | |
| Starbuck | Ken Scott | Patrick Huard, Julie Le Breton, Antoine Bertrand | Comedy | Golden Reel Award; remade as Delivery Man, and Vince Vaughn played the lead character in 2013. |
| Sunday (Dimanche) | Patrick Doyon | | National Film Board animated short | Academy Award nominee; Prix Jutra – Animated Short |
| Surviving Progress | Mathieu Roy & Harold Crooks | | Documentary | Based on the book, A Short History of Progress |
| Take This Waltz | Sarah Polley | Michelle Williams, Seth Rogen, Sarah Silverman | Romantic drama | |
| Textuality | Warren P. Sonoda | Jason Lewis, Carly Pope, Eric McCormack | Romantic comedy | |
| Three Walls | Zaheed Mawani | | Documentary | |
| Thrill of the Hills (Frisson des collines) | Richard Roy | Antoine Olivier Pilon, Antoine Bertrand, Evelyne Brochu | Coming-of-age drama | |
| Throat Song | Miranda de Pencier | Ippiksaut Friesen | Short drama | |
| Trash (Décharge) | Benoît Pilon | David Boutin, Isabel Richer, Sophie Desmarais | Drama | |
| Trente tableaux | Paule Baillargeon | | National Film Board Autobiographical documentary | |
| Trotteur | Arnaud Brisebois, Francis Leclerc | Kyle Gatehouse | Shirt drama | |
| Tucker & Dale vs. Evil | Eli Craig | Tyler Labine, Alan Tudyk, Katrina Bowden, Jesse Moss | Comedy, horror | Made with U.S. financing |
| Upside Down | Juan Diego Solanas | Jim Sturgess, Kirsten Dunst | Sci-fi/Romance | Canada-France co-production |
| The Van Doos in Afghanistan | Claude Guilmain | | National Film Board documentary | Following the Royal 22nd Regiment |
| We Ate the Children Last | Andrew Cividino | Keith Berry, David Disher, Frank Longo, Ryan Ward | Science fiction short | |
| West Wind: The Vision of Tom Thomson | Peter Raymont, Michèle Hozer | | Documentary | |
| Wetlands (Marécages) | Guy Édoin | Pascale Bussières, Gabriel Maillé, Luc Picard | Drama | |
| Wild Life | Wendy Tilby & Amanda Forbis | voices Adam Blackwood, Luba Goy | National Film Board animated short | Academy Award nominee |
| Winnie Mandela | Darrell Roodt | Jennifer Hudson, Terrence Howard | Biodrama | About the life of Winnie Mandela; Canada-South Africa co-production |
| Wrecked | Michael Greenspan | Adrien Brody | Thriller | |
| The Year Dolly Parton Was My Mom | Tara Johns | Macha Grenon, Gil Bellows, Julia Stone | Coming-of-age drama | |
| You Got Served: Beat the World | Robert Adetuyi | Tyrone Brown, Mishael Morgan | Dance film | |

== See also ==
- 2011 in Canada
- 2011 in Canadian television
