= 15th Jutra Awards =

2013 Canadian film awards ceremony

The 15th Prix Jutra ceremony was held on March 17, 2013 at the Salle Pierre-Mercure theatre in Montreal, Quebec, to honour achievements in the Cinema of Quebec in 2012.

War Witch (Rebelle) swept the ceremony, winning eight awards out of ten nominations, including Best Film, Best Director and Best Screenplay. It also won two acting awards, becoming the first film to win Best Actress and Best Supporting Actor for Rachel Mwanza and Serge Kanyinda respectively, who became the first black actress and actor to win an acting Jutra award. However, the film lost the award for Most Successful Film Outside Quebec to previous year's Best Film winner Monsieur Lazhar, which in turn had lost the same award to that year's previous Best Film winner Incendies. All three of these films were nominated for the Academy Award for Best Foreign Language Film.

Xavier Dolan's Laurence Anyways received a leading eleven nominations and won three awards, while Camion received two awards from eight nominations, including Best Actor for Julien Poulin. This was Poulin's second acting award, having previously won Best Supporting Actor for The Last Breath (Le dernier souffle).

== Winners and nominees ==
Best Film	Best Director
War Witch (Rebelle) — Pierre Even, Marie-Claude Poulin; Camion — Stéphanie Morissette; Inch'Allah — Luc Déry, Kim McCraw; Laurence Anyways — Charles Gillibert, Nathanaël Karmitz, Lyse Lafontaine; Romeo Eleven (Roméo Onze) — Paul Barbeau	Kim Nguyen, War Witch (Rebelle); Xavier Dolan, Laurence Anyways; Ivan Grbovic, Romeo Eleven (Roméo Onze); Rafaël Ouellet, Camion; Podz, L'Affaire Dumont
Best Actor	Best Actress
Julien Poulin, Camion; Ali Ammar, Romeo Eleven (Roméo Onze); Gabriel Arcand, Karakara; Marc-André Grondin, L'Affaire Dumont; Victor Andrés Trelles Turgeon, The Torrent (Le torrent)	Rachel Mwanza, War Witch (Rebelle); Micheline Bernard, Small Blind (La mise à l'aveugle); Marilyn Castonguay, L'Affaire Dumont; Suzanne Clément, Laurence Anyways; Dominique Quesnel, The Torrent (Le torrent)
Best Supporting Actor	Best Supporting Actress
Serge Kanyinda, War Witch (Rebelle); Joey Klein, The Girl in the White Coat; Guy Nadon, The Pee-Wee 3D: The Winter That Changed My Life (Les Pee-Wee 3D: L'hiver qui a changé ma vie); Sébastien Ricard, Before My Heart Falls (Avant que mon cœur bascule); Gildor Roy, Ésimésac	Sabrina Ouazani, Inch'Allah; Nathalie Baye, Laurence Anyways; Monia Chokri, Laurence Anyways; Sophie Lorain, Before My Heart Falls (Avant que mon cœur bascule); Ève Ringuette, Mesnak
Best Screenplay	Best Documentary
Kim Nguyen, War Witch (Rebelle); Xavier Dolan, Laurence Anyways; Claude Gagnon, Karakara; Ivan Grbovic and Sara Mishara, Romeo Eleven (Roméo Onze); Rafaël Ouellet, Camion	Over My Dead Body — Brigitte Poupart; Alphée of the Stars (Alphée des étoiles) — Hugo Latulippe; Bestiaire — Denis Côté; Mort subite d'un homme-théâtre — Jean-Claude Coulbois; My Real Life (Ma vie réelle) — Magnus Isacsson
Best Live Short	Best Animated Short Film
Where I Am (Là où je suis) — Myriam Magassouba; Acrobat — Eduardo Menz; Herd Leader (Chef de meute) — Chloé Robichaud; The Near Future (Le futur proche) — Sophie Goyette; With Jeff (Avec Jeff, à moto) — Marie-Ève Juste	Bydlo — Patrick Bouchard; Here and the Great Elsewhere (Le grand ailleurs et le petit ici) — Michèle Lemieux; Joda — Théodore Ushev; Kaspar — Diane Obomsawin; Triptych 2 (Triptyque 2) — Pierre Hébert
Best Art Direction	Best Cinematography
Anne Pritchard, Laurence Anyways; Éric Barbeau, The Torrent (Le torrent); André-Line Beauparlant, Inch'Allah; André Guimond, L'Affaire Dumont; François Schuiten, Patrick Sioui, Martin Tessier and Élisabeth Williams, Mars and April (Mars et Avril)	Nicolas Bolduc, War Witch (Rebelle); Yves Bélanger, Laurence Anyways; Mathieu Laverdière, The Torrent (Le torrent); Sara Mishara, All That You Possess (Tout ce que tu possèdes); Geneviève Perron, Camion
Best Editing	Best Original Music
Richard Comeau, War Witch (Rebelle); Hélène Girard, Beyond the Walls (Hors les murs); Hubert Hayaud, Romeo Eleven (Roméo Onze); Sophie Leblond, Inch'Allah; Rafaël Ouellet, Camion	Viviane Audet, Robin-Joël Cool and Éric West-Millette, Camion; Benoît Charest, A Bottle in the Gaza Sea (Une bouteille dans la mer de Gaza); Benoît Charest, Mars and April (Mars et Avril); Normand Corbeil, The Torrent (Le torrent); Michel Corriveau, Ésimésac
Best Costume Design	Best Makeup
Carmen Alie, Ésimésac; Mariane Carter, Mars and April (Mars et Avril); Monic Ferland, L'Affaire Dumont; Sophie Lefebvre, Inch'Allah; Éric Poirier, War Witch (Rebelle)	Kathy Kelso and Colleen Quinton, Laurence Anyways; Kathryn Casault, Ésimésac; Kathryn Casault, The Bossé Empire (L'empire Bossé); Pascale Jones, The Girl in the White Coat; Marlène Rouleau, L'Affaire Dumont
Best Hairstyling	Best Sound
Michelle Côté and Martin Lapointe, Laurence Anyways; André Duval, L'Affaire Dumont; Richard Hansen, Mars and April (Mars et Avril); Ann-Louise Landry, The Bossé Empire (L'empire Bossé); Denis Parent, Ésimésac	Claude La Haye, Martin Pinsonnault and Bernard Gariépy Strobl, War Witch (Rebelle); Pierre-Jules Audet, Luc Boudrias and Michel Lecoufle, L'Affaire Dumont; Pascal Beaudin, Luc Boudrias and Olivier Calvert, Mars and April (Mars et Avril); Sylvain Bellemare, Jean-Paul Hurier and Jean Umansky, Inch'Allah; Luc Boudrias, Marcel Chouinard and Patrice Leblanc, The Torrent (Le torrent)
Most Successful Film Outside Quebec	Special awards
Monsieur Lazhar — Philippe Falardeau; Bestiaire — Denis Côté; Camion — Rafaël Ouellet; Laurence Anyways — Xavier Dolan; Starbuck — Ken Scott; War Witch (Rebelle) — Kim Nguyen	Jutra Hommage: Michel Côté; Billet d'or: Omertà

== Multiple wins and nominations ==
=== Films with multiple nominations ===
Nominations	Film
11	Laurence Anyways
10	War Witch (Rebelle)
8	L'Affaire Dumont
8	Camion
6	Inch'Allah
6	The Torrent (Le torrent)
5	Ésimésac
5	Mars and April
5	Romeo Eleven (Roméo Onze)
2	Before My Heart Falls (Avant que mon cœur bascule)
2	The Bossé Empire (L'empire Bossé)
2	The Girl in the White Coat
2	Karakara

=== Films with multiple wins ===
Wins	Film
8	War Witch (Rebelle)
3	Laurence Anyways
2	Camion
