= Ali Ammar =

Ali Ammar may refer to:

- Ali La Pointe (Ali Ammar, 1930–1957), Algerian freedom fighter
- Ali Ammar (Canadian actor), actor in Romeo Eleven
- Ali Ammar (politician) (born 1956), Lebanese politician
- Ali Ammar (weightlifter) (born 2004), Iraqi weightlifter

== See also ==
- Ammar Ali, Iraqi wheelchair fencer
