= Emmanuel Fréchette =

Canadian film production designer

- Born: January 15, 1969 (age 56); Montreal (Quebec), Canada
- Occupation: Production Designer • Art Director
- Years active: 2008 — present

Emmanuel Fréchette (born January 15, 1969) is a Canadian film production designer and Commercial art director, best known for his collaborations with Kim Nguyen, Andrew Haigh, and Wim Wenders. He has worked extensively with the Canadian film and advertising industry, Netflix, and independent European films and series.

Trained as an architect, Fréchette is fluent in French, English, and Spanish. He has developed expertise in filming in challenging natural environments, including forests, snow-covered landscapes, Arctic ice floes, and the open sea.

== Early life and education ==
Fréchette grew up in Montreal, Canada. He studied architecture at Université Laval in Quebec City and completed an internship in Mexico City.

== Filmography ==
As Production Designer
Year	Title	Notes	Ref(s)
2025	Wayward		
2023	One Summer (Le temps d'un été)		
2022	White Dog (Chien Blanc)		
2021	The North Water		
2020	The Decline (Jusqu’au déclin)		
2018	The Hummingbird Project	Official Selection, Toronto Film Festival (2018); Official Selection, London Film Festival (2018)	
2018	Birthmarked		
2017	Allure		
2017	Eye on Juliet		
2016	Two Lovers And A Bear	Official Selection, Cannes Film Festival (2016); Official Selection, Toronto Film Festival (2016); Winner, Achievement in Production Design, Canadian Screen Awards (2017); Official Selection, London Film Festival (2016)	
2015	Endorphine		
2014	Everything Will Be Fine	Official Selection, Berlin Film Festival (2015); Official Selection, Toronto Film Festival (2015)	
2013	Gabrielle	Official Selection, Toronto Film Festival (2013)	
2013	Whitewash	Winner, Best New Narrative Director, Tribeca Film Festival (2013)	
2012	War Witch (Rebelle)	Winner, Best Movie, Canadian Screen Awards (2013); Winner, Best Production Design, Canadian Screen Awards (2013)	
2011	A Better Life (Une vie meilleure)	Official Selection, Toronto Film Festival (2011)	
2011	Monsieur Lazhar	Nominated, Best Foreign Language Film, Academy Awards (2012); Official Selection, Sundance Film Festival (2012); Winner, Best Canadian Feature, Toronto Film Festival (2011)	
2010	Route 132		
2009	Father and Guns (De père en flic)		
2008	Le grand départ		
