= Sara Mishara =

American-Canadian cinematographer

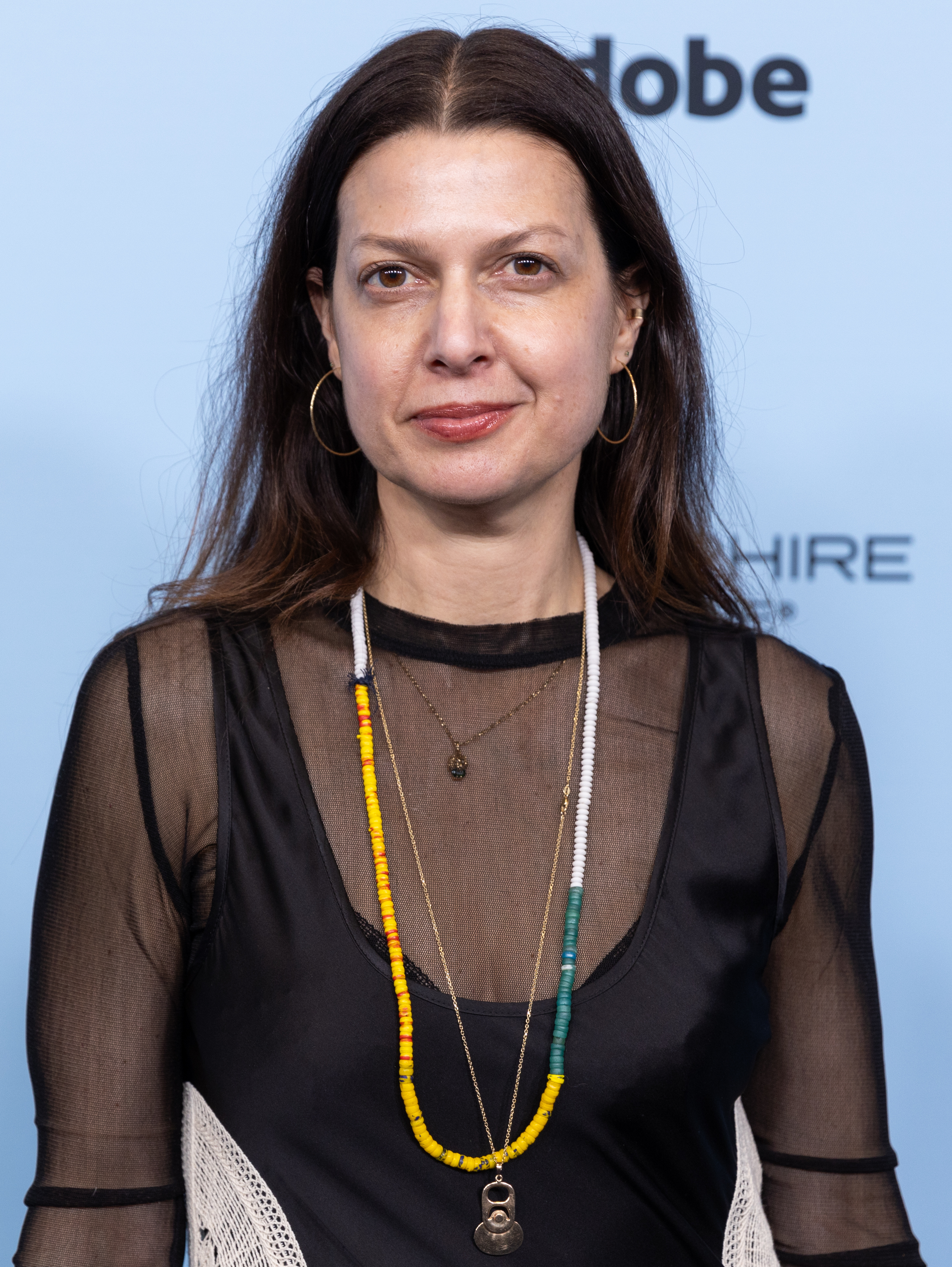
- Occupations: Screenwriter, cinematographer

Sara Mishara (born July 8, 1976) is an American-Canadian cinematographer. She has been a three-time Canadian Screen Award winner for Best Cinematography at the 7th Canadian Screen Awards in 2019 for her work on the film The Great Darkened Days (La grande noirceur), at the 10th Canadian Screen Awards in 2022 for Drunken Birds (Les Oiseaux ivres), and at the 11th Canadian Screen Awards in 2023 for Viking.

She was also a dual nominee in 2019 for Allure, and was previously nominated in the same category at the 28th Genie Awards for Everything Is Fine (Tout est parfait) and at the 4th Canadian Screen Awards for Felix and Meira (Félix et Meira).

She won the Prix Iris for Best Cinematography at the 24th Quebec Cinema Awards for Drunken Birds, and received four previous Prix Jutra nominations for Best Cinematography for her work on Continental, a Film Without Guns (Continental, un film sans fusil), The Legacy (La Donation), All That You Possess (Tout ce que tu possèdes) and You're Sleeping Nicole (Tu dors Nicole).

Born in Boston, Massachusetts, she studied film at Concordia University and the Prague Film School. She was a cowriter with Ivan Grbovic of the films Romeo Eleven (Roméo Onze) and Drunken Birds, with the duo receiving a Jutra nomination for Best Screenplay for Romeo Eleven (Roméo Onze) at the 15th Jutra Awards in 2013, and winning for Drunken Birds at the 24th Quebec Cinema Awards in 2022.

Alongside Nicolas Bolduc, Erik Ljung, Tobie Marier Robitaille, Van Royko, Alexia Toman and André Turpin, she won a Gémeaux Award for Best Photography in a Documentary or Public Affairs program in 2024 for Lac-Mégantic: This Is Not an Accident (Lac-Mégantic : ceci n’est pas un accident).

== Filmography ==
- Angélique - 1999
- Versus - 2000
- The Pedestrian - 2001
- Hardcore Action News - 2003
- Being Dorothy - 2004
- Doux rendez-vous - 2004
- When Erma Made Herman - 2006
- Between Life and Death - 2006
- Continental, a Film Without Guns (Continental, un film sans fusil) - 2007
- Everything Is Fine (Tout est parfait) - 2008
- Sunday Afternoon 2008
- Upwards March - 2008
- Shadow Riders - 2008
- Tomorrow (Demain) - 2008
- The Legacy (La Donation) - 2009
- Les mots - 2009
- Jo for Jonathan (Jo pour Jonathan) - 2010
- Familiar Grounds (En terrains connus) - 2011
- Romeo Eleven (Roméo Onze) - 2011
- All That You Possess (Tout ce que tu possèdes) - 2012
- La tête en bas - 2013
- You're Sleeping Nicole (Tu dors Nicole) - 2014
- Felix and Meira (Félix et Meira) - 2014
- An Apartment - 2014
- Allure - 2017
- Boundaries (Pays) - 2018
- The Great Darkened Days (La grande noirceur) - 2018
- My Salinger Year - 2020
- Drunken Birds (Les Oiseaux ivres) - 2021
- Viking - 2022
- Norbourg - 2022
- Lac-Mégantic: This Is Not an Accident (Lac-Mégantic : ceci n’est pas un accident) - 2023
- In Cold Light - 2025
- The Players - 2025
- Two Women (Deux femmes en or) - 2025
- The Cost of Heaven (Gagne ton ciel) - 2025
- The Stunt Driver - 2026
- François.e - 2026
