= Paul Barbeau =

Canadian director and film producer

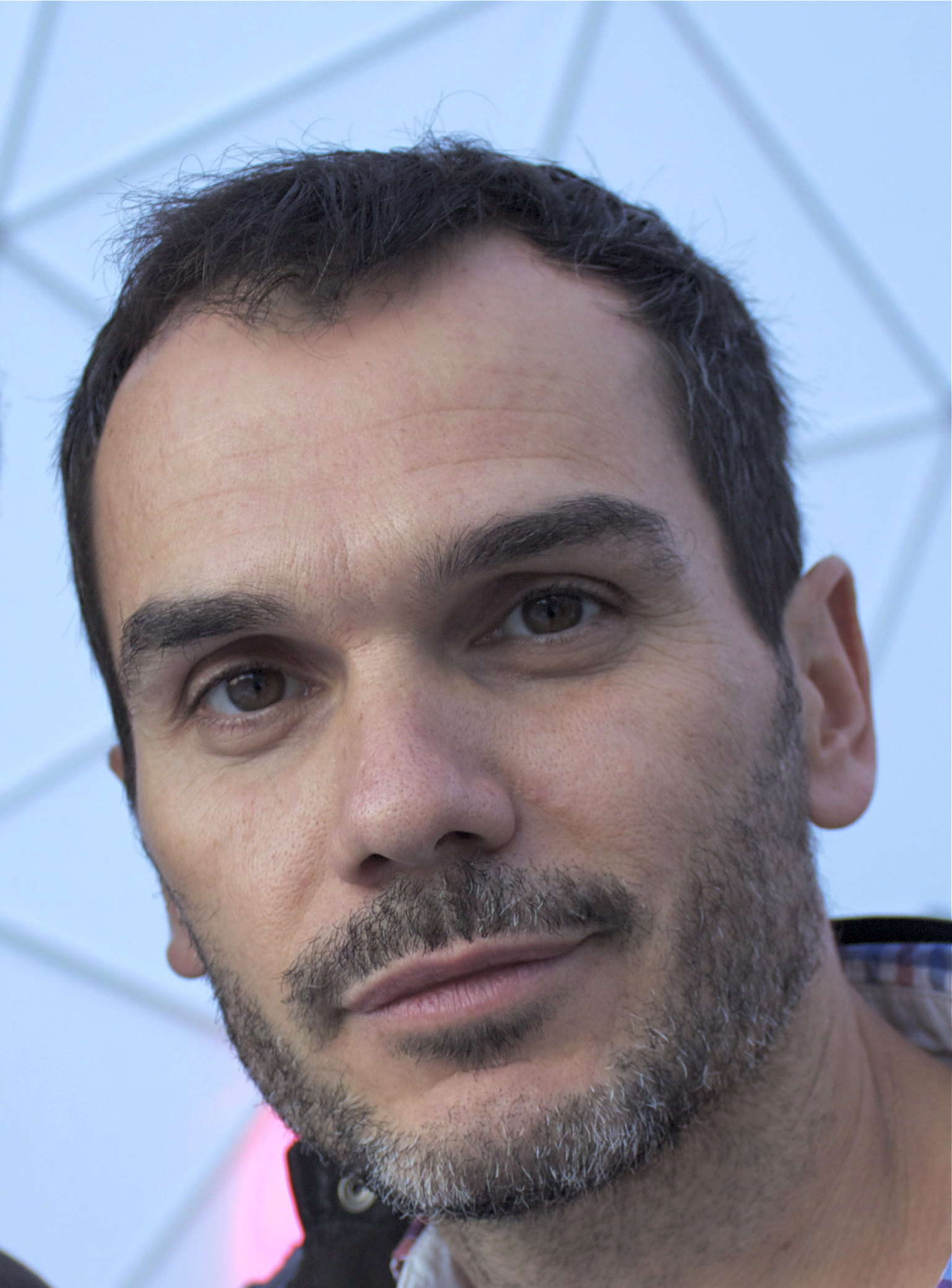
- Paul Barbeau, Quebec City Film Festival 2012
- Occupation: Film Producer

Paul Barbeau is a Canadian film director and producer.

Barbeau began his career producing music videos with NúFilms, which he founded with Bernard Nadeau, Stéphane Raymond and Jean-François Lord in May 2000. NuFilms later shut down, citing the financial impacts of illegal downloading of music during Napster's surge.

He produced the early short films of Maxime Giroux, as well as Giroux's early features, and was the producer of Ivan Grbovic's debut film Romeo Eleven (Roméo Onze).

Barbeau subsequently wrote and directed his directorial debut, Winter Passed (Après la neige). He followed up as a director with the films We Have Forever (À nous l'éternité) in 2018, and We Had It Coming in 2019.

In recent years he has had co-producer or executive producer credits on international films, including Pieces of a Woman (2020), Woman of the Hour (2023),Novocaine (2025) and Splitsville (film)

== Filmography ==
- Red (Le rouge au sol) - 2006, producer
- The Days (Les Jours) - 2006, producer
- Hotel - 2007, producer
- Souffle - 2007, producer
- Can You Wave Bye-Bye? - 2007, producer
- Tomorrow (Demain) - 2008, producer
- La Chute - 2009, producer
- Les Mots - 2009, producer
- Jo for Jonathan (Jo pour Jonathan) - 2010, producer
- Romeo Eleven (Roméo Onze) - 2011, producer
- Winter Passed (Après la neige) - 2012, producer and director
- Before My Heart Falls (Avant que mon cœur bascule) - 2012, producer
- The Handout (Autrui) - 2015, producer
- Black Friday - 2018, producer
- We Have Forever (À nous l'éternité) - 2018, director and producer
- We Had It Coming - 2019, director and producer
- Pieces of a Woman - 2020, co-producer
- Woman of the Hour - 2023, executive producer
- To Catch a Killer - 2023, executive producer
- Novocaine - 2025, executive producer
- Splitsville - 2025, executive producer

== Awards ==
Award	Date of ceremony	Category	Work	Result	Ref.
Genie Awards	2007	Best Live Action Short Drama	Red (Le rouge au sol) with Maxime Giroux	Won	
Genie Awards	2009	Best Live Action Short Drama	Can You Wave Bye-Bye? with Sarah Galea-Davis	Nominated	
Jutra Awards	2013	Best Film	Romeo Eleven (Roméo Onze)	Nominated	
