= Jorge Antonio Guerrero =

Mexican actor

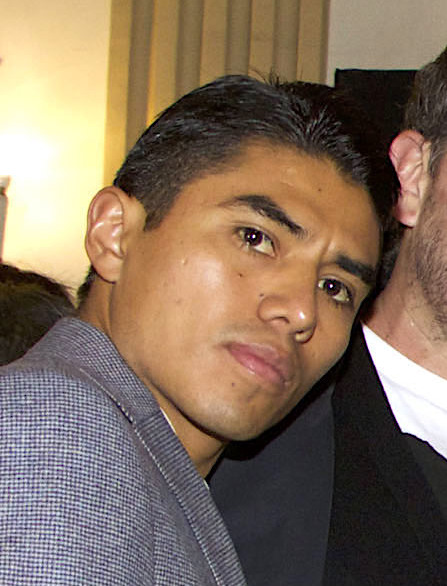
- Guerrero in 2018
- Born: August 11, 1987 (age 38)
- Occupation: Actor
- Years active: 2018–present

Jorge Antonio Guerrero (born August 11, 1987) is a Mexican actor. He is best known for his roles in Roma (2018) and Drunken Birds (2021).

He has also appeared in the television series Crime Diaries: The Candidate, Sitiados: México and Hernán.

== Career ==
He is most noted for his performance as Fermín in the 2018 film Roma, for which he was an Ariel Award nominee for Best Supporting Actor at the 61st Ariel Awards in 2019. He received further accolades for his role as Willy in the 2021 film Drunken Birds, including a Vancouver Film Critics Circle nomination for Best Actor in a Canadian Film at the Vancouver Film Critics Circle Awards 2021, and a Prix Iris nomination for Revelation of the Year at the 24th Quebec Cinema Awards in 2022.

== Filmography ==
=== Film ===
Year	Title	Role	Notes
2018	Roma	Fermín	
2021	Everybody's Talking About Jamie	Dancer	
2021	We Are Living Things	Solomon	
2021	Drunken Birds	Willy	
2022	Eagle Knight	Nacho	
2023	City of Dreams	José	
2023	Luna negra	Irvin	
2023	El Águila y el Gusano	Pepino	
2024	Without Blood	El Blanco	
2025	Emiliano's Mask	Emiliano Zapata	Short film

=== Television ===
Year	Title	Role	Notes
2018	Luis Miguel: The Series	Cadete Tello	2 episodes
2018	Narcos: Mexico	Third Narco	Episode: El Padrino
2019	Crime Diaries: The Candidate	Mario Aburto	8 episodes
2019	Sitiados: México	Tonahuac	8 episodes
2019	Hernán	Xicoténcatl	8 episodes
2021	The Five Juanas	Lorenzo Marquez	17 episodes
2022	El Refugio	Pedro Joven	6 episodes
