= The Colony (2013 film) =

2013 science fiction action film by Jeff Renfroe

- Poster
- Directed by: Jeff Renfroe
- Written by: Jeff Renfroe; Svet Rouskov; Patrick Tarr; Pascal Trottier
- Produced by: Paul Barkin; Matthew Cervi; Pierre Even; Marie-Claude Poulin
- Starring: Kevin Zegers; Bill Paxton; Charlotte Sullivan; Dru Viergever; Atticus Mitchell; John Tench; Lisa Berry; Julian Richings; Laurence Fishburne
- Cinematography: Pierre Gill
- Edited by: Aaron Marshall
- Music by: Jeff Danna
- Production company: RLJ Entertainment
- Distributed by: Entertainment One; Image Entertainment
- Release date: 26 April 2013
- Running time: 93 minutes
- Country: Canada
- Language: English
- Budget: $16 million (CA$)

The Colony is a 2013 Canadian post-apocalyptic science fiction action film directed by Jeff Renfroe, starring Laurence Fishburne, Kevin Zegers, and Bill Paxton. It had a limited release on 26 April 2013 in Canada, and was released on 20 September 2013 in the United States.

== Plot ==
Humans have built climate modification towers to control Earth's warming climate due to climate change. The towers, however, inadvertently cause a new ice age. By 2045, the remnants of human civilization live in underground bunkers to escape the extreme cold. Their challenges are controlling disease and producing sufficient food. Two soldiers, Briggs and Mason are the leaders of one such bunker, Colony 7. Briggs, Sam and Graydon travel to nearby Colony 5 after receiving a distress signal. Briggs leaves Sam's lover Kai in charge of the colony while he is gone, much to Mason's chagrin.

Upon arrival, they find Colony 5 covered in blood. They eventually reach a locked door which Sam picks open. Inside they find Leland, who shows them a message they received from another group of people who fixed a weather machine and have caused the snow to thaw. The group offers aid to anyone and asks that they bring seeds so they can be planted in the newly thawed permafrost soil. Leland shows them where the signal came from, but informs them that an expedition failed to find the source of the transmission. Moreover, the expedition's tracks led a marauding group of cannibals back to Colony 5, and the killing ensued. Briggs, Sam, and Graydon try to force Leland to return with them, but he locks himself back into his room.

The three then begin to explore Colony 5 and approach a room where a fire burns. Here they see a human chopping up members of Colony 5, while others feast on human remains. As the three try to escape, Graydon is killed by the cannibals. Briggs and Sam are able to make it up the ladder out of the colony and destroy the shaft with a stick of dynamite. Taking shelter in an abandoned helicopter, they wake up in the morning to find that the cannibals have managed to escape from the entombed Colony 5 and have tracked their footprints in the snow. Briggs suggests that they lure the group over a decrepit bridge then use dynamite. When the dynamite fuse goes out, Briggs rushes back to light it, but is attacked by the cannibals. He relights the fuse and sacrifices himself to blow a large gap in the bridge.

Kai gets into a heated argument with Mason after learning that he intends to kill a colonist without testing her for disease. Their argument is interrupted when Kai spots a returning, exhausted Sam and runs to him, but Mason promptly knocks her out. When Sam awakens, he finds Mason has taken over and plans to make harsh changes. Sam explains that the cannibals are coming and that there is a thawed-out area they should flee to. Mason does not believe him, thinking he has become unhinged by his ordeal, and handcuffs him to a bed. Sam is able to get free and checks images from a functioning satellite to locate the thawed-out zone. Then the cannibals arrive. Many of the Colony 7 inhabitants are killed, including Sam's friend Viktor. The survivors lock themselves in a room. Sam and Kai bang on the door, but Mason will not let them in. Briggs' daughter Nara knocks Mason down and lets them in. Sam opens a vent for an escape route. The wounded Mason stays behind and, when the cannibals break in, shoots a propane container, causing an explosion that kills presumably all but the leader. The cannibals' leader pursues and attacks Sam, but Sam is able to kill him. Then he, Kai, Nara and a few others begin their journey to the thawed-out site with the precious seeds.

== Cast ==
- Laurence Fishburne as Briggs
- Kevin Zegers as Sam
- Bill Paxton as Mason
- Charlotte Sullivan as Kai
- John Tench as Viktor
- Lisa Berry as Nara
- Atticus Mitchell as Graydon
- Dru Viergever as Feral Leader
- Romano Orzari as Reynolds
- Michael Mando as Cooper
- Earl Pastko as the Scientist
- Julian Richings as Leyland

== Production ==
The film was shot at CFB North Bay using former NORAD facilities and at the R. L. Hearn Generating Station in Toronto.

== Reception ==
Rotten Tomatoes gives the film a score of 18% based on reviews from 33 critics, and a rating average of 4 out of 10. The consensus states "A formulaic sci-fi thriller, The Colony features clichéd dialogue, cheesy special effects, and underdeveloped characters." Critics considered the film to consist of old science fiction ideas. Peter Howell of the Toronto Star noted it could "show investors how well Canadians can mimic Hollywood blockbusters, decent CGI and all, using a fraction of the budget". Jay Stone of Postmedia deemed the film had "too many clichés ... and half-developed characters to make us care enough." The Globe and Mail's Liam Lacey also panned the recycled nature of the plot, although noting the scenes appeared to be "authentically chilly throughout".

The film received two Canadian Screen Award nominations at the 2nd Canadian Screen Awards in 2014, for Best Costume Design (Lea Carlson) and Best Makeup (Louise Mackintosh, Peggy Kyriakidou and Shauna Llewellyn).

== Home media ==
The Colony was released on DVD and Blu-ray on 27 August 2013 in Canada, 15 October 2013 in the United States and 20 January 2014 in the United Kingdom.
