= 2011 in Canadian television =

The following is a list of events affecting Canadian television in 2011. Events listed include television show debuts, finales, cancellations, and channel launches, closures and rebrandings.

== Events ==
=== January ===
Date	Event
3	The American-Canadian animated television series The Adventures of Chuck and Friends begins airing on Treehouse.
5	The American-Canadian animated television series My Little Pony: Friendship Is Magic begins airing on Treehouse.
6	Almost 7 million people watch the 2011 World Junior Ice Hockey Championships final on TSN and RDS.
11	YTV and Family Channel both launch high-definition simulcasts of their east coast video feeds, effectively becoming the first children's networks in Canada to air in HD. These feeds are available through all major television providers in Canada. The latter also undergoes a major rebranding.

=== February ===
Date	Event
7	Niagara News TV, a Category B regional news channel serving the Niagara Region, begins broadcasting in Niagara Falls on Cogeco Cable digital channel 556. The channel would later indefinitely suspend operations on April 18, 2011, because of "technical difficulties" cited by owner Peninsula Broadcasting Corporation's president Frank Thibault, with plans to resume operations by fall 2011.

=== March ===
Date	Event
1	Corus Entertainment relaunches Viva as the Canadian version of the Oprah Winfrey Network.

=== April ===
Date	Event
12	A combined 3.2 million people watch the 2011 federal leaders debate on the three main networks.
18	Category B channel Sun News Network debuts, with Toronto independent station CKXT-DT and its Hamilton, Ottawa and London translators being effectively turned into a full-power broadcast relay of the network in Southern Ontario.

=== May ===
Date	Event
2	Mlle, a French-language Category B service aimed at women owned by Groupe TVA, launches.

=== June ===
Date	Event
1	WildBrain TV launched as Disney XD; the WildBrain-owned specialty channel, formerly owned by Astral Media (licensed separately from premium channel Family Channel, which held programming from the U.S. Disney XD's sister network Disney Channel until 2015) was aimed at an audience between 7 and 15 years old. As Family was previously licensed as a premium television service, and like the channel itself and unlike its sister channel Family Jr. and, at the time, unlike its former sister channels The Movie Network and MPix, and like their former joint venture Teletoon (co-owned with Corus Entertainment at the time) and their BC CBC affiliates, the channel ran commercials during programs.
15	8.7 million people watch Game 7 of the 2011 Stanley Cup Finals on CBC.
24	OLN is launched in high-definition.

=== August ===
Date	Event
2	Launch of W Network in high-definition.
27	The state funeral for opposition leader Jack Layton airs live on all the main television networks.
29	The A television system, as well as Alberta-based educational/entertainment service Access rebrand as CTV Two. At the same time, CJAL-TV (channel 9) in Edmonton and CIAN-TV (channel 13) in Calgary, which both relayed Access' programming over-the-air sign off the air as Access is licensed as a satellite-to-cable undertaking.
31	Analog television is switched off in all of Canada.

=== September ===
Date	Event
7	The 2011 Gemini Awards air on CBC Television.

=== October ===
Date	Event
3	Rogers Communications launches CityNews Channel, a Category B 24-hour regional cable news channel available in Ontario, based out of the studios of Citytv flagship station CITY-DT.
31	FX Canada launches across the country, the Rogers Communications-owned Category B channel primarily carries original programming from the U.S. cable network FX.

=== November ===
Date	Event
1	Toronto station CKXT-DT (channel 52) and its Hamilton and London, Ontario transmitters shut down. CKXT's Ottawa transmitter shut down more than two months earlier on August 31. The move by owner Quebecor Media was due to a CRTC inquiry in early July on the company's usage of the CKXT signal to simulcast Sun News.

== Television programs ==
=== Programs debuting in 2011 ===
Series currently listed here have been announced by their respective networks as scheduled to premiere in 2011. Note that shows may be delayed or cancelled by the network between now and their scheduled air dates.

Show	Station	Premiere Date
The Adventures of Chuck and Friends	Treehouse TV	January 3
InSecurity	CBC	January 4
My Little Pony: Friendship Is Magic	Treehouse TV	January 5
Almost Naked Animals	YTV	January 7
The Marilyn Denis Show	CTV	January 10
Being Human	Space	January 17
Skins	The Movie Network/Movie Central	January 17
Blackstone	APTN	January 25
Mr. Young	YTV	March 1
Funny as Hell	HBO Canada	March 11
My Babysitter's a Vampire: The Series	Teletoon	March 14 (English); February 28 (French)
Endgame	Showcase	March 14
Splatalot!	YTV	March 14
Scaredy Squirrel	YTV	April 3
Wipeout Canada	TVtropolis	April 3
Til Debt Do Us Part: Home Edition	HGTV	April 7
Decked Out	HGTV	April 7
Top Chef Canada	Food Network	
King	Showcase	April 17
XIII: The Series	Showcase	April 20
Combat Hospital	Global	April 21
Really Me	Family	April 22
Debra!	Family	June 4
Picnicface	The Comedy Network	August 31
Intervention Canada	Slice	September 9
Michael: Tuesdays and Thursdays	CBC	September 14
Cover Me Canada	CBC	September 18
Crash Canyon	Teletoon at Night	September 18
Recipe to Riches	Food Network and Global	October 19
The West Block	Global	November 6

=== Programs ending in 2011 ===
Show	Station	End date
Carl²	Teletoon	January 23
Make the Politician Work	CBC	February 27
Total Drama World Tour	Teletoon	April 24
Météo+	TFO	April 28
Kid vs Kat	YTV	June 4
Dan for Mayor	CTV	September 13
Hiccups	CTV	September 13
So You Think You Can Dance Canada	CTV	September 13
How to Be Indie	YTV	October 24
Being Erica	CBC	December 12

=== Made for TV movies & miniseries ===
Show	Station	Premiere Date
The Kennedys	History Television	April 10
John A.: Birth of a Country	CBC Television	September 19

== Deaths ==
Date	Name	Age	Notability	Source
January 8	Peter Donaldson	57	Known best for his stage work, he had recurring guest spots on Road to Avonlea, Street Legal, and Emily of New Moon, starring as John Adams in Liberty! The American Revolution.	
March 26	Roger Abbott	64	British-born Canadian sketch comedian, best known for his years on radio and television program Royal Canadian Air Farce (1975–2010). Also co-executive produced XPM (2003).	
April 4	Wayne Robson	64	Canadian television, film and stage actor best known for playing the part of Mike Hamar, an ex-con on The Red Green Show. He won Gemini Awards for And Then You Die (1987) and The Diviners (1993).	
April 17	Michael Sarrazin	70	Canadian film and television. Recurring role on The City. Guest spots on The Virginian, Wojeck, Street Legal, Murder, She Wrote, and Star Trek: Deep Space Nine.	
June 9	Claude Léveillée	78	Singer appearing on French television as an actor.	
July 5	Gordon Tootoosis CM	69	Canadian film, television, and theatre actor of Cree and Stoney descent, Order of Canada winner. In 2011, he co-starred in Blackstone, a series for APTN and Showcase. Television roles include Albert Golo on North of 60, for which he was twice nominated for a Gemini Award, and the voice of Mushom in Wapos Bay: The Series, for which he shared a Gemini Award. Guest spots include MacGyver, Northern Exposure, Lonesome Dove: The Series, and Smallville.	
September 15	Frances Bay	92	Canadian-born American actress (Seinfeld, Happy Days, The Middle)	

== Television stations ==
=== Debuts ===
Date	Market	Station	Channel	Affiliation	Notes/References
August 1	Bellingham, Washington (USA) (Vancouver, British Columbia)	KBCB-DT2	24.2	Estrella TV	
August 18	Bellingham, Washington (USA) (Vancouver, British Columbia)	KVOS-DT2	12.2	TheCoolTV (not to be confused with Canadian cable channel CoolTV)	
October 3	Toronto, Ontario	CityNews Channel	(cable-only)	CityNews	

=== Network affiliation changes ===
Date	Market	Station	Channel	Old affiliation	New affiliation	References
April 18	Toronto, Ontario	CKXT-TV/DT	52 (analogue); 66 (digital)	Independent	Sun News Network (simulcast)	
April 25	Bellingham, Washington (USA) (Vancouver, British Columbia)	KVOS-TV	12.1	Independent	MeTV	

=== Closures ===
Date	Market	Station	Channel	Affiliation	Notes
November 1	Toronto, Ontario	CKXT-TV/DT	52 (analog); 66 (digital)	Sun News Network	

== See also ==
- 2011 in Canada
- List of Canadian films of 2011
