= Meetings with a Young Poet =

- Directed by: Rudy Barichello
- Screenplay by: Rudy Barichello; Marcel Beaulieu
- Produced by: Pierre Even; Marie-Claude Poulin
- Starring: Stephen McHattie; Vincent Hoss-Desmarais; Maria de Medeiros
- Cinematography: Michel La Veaux
- Edited by: Dominique Fortin
- Music by: Patrice Dubuc; Gaëtan Gravel
- Production company: Item 7
- Distributed by: TVA Films
- Release date: November 24, 2013
- Running time: 85 minutes
- Country: Canada
- Languages: English; French; Italian; German

Meetings with a Young Poet is a Canadian film that premiered at the 2013 International Film Festival of India. It was directed by Rudy Barichello and stars Stephen McHattie, Vincent Hoss-Desmarais and Maria de Medeiros.

The film explores the life and works of Irish playwright, poet and author Samuel Beckett, through his discussions with a depressed young poet from Montreal, Quebec.

== Awards ==
Award	Year	Category	Work	Result	Ref(s)
Canadian Screen Awards	2015	Best Cinematography	Michel La Veaux	Nominated	
Canadian Screen Awards	2015	Best Overall Sound	Daniel Bisson, Gilles Corbeil, Bernard Gariépy Strobl	Nominated	
Canadian Screen Awards	2015	Best Sound Editing	Raymond Legault, Simon Meilleur, Martin Pinsonnault, Claire Pochon	Nominated	
Canadian Screen Awards	2015	Best Original Score	Patrice Dubuc, Gaëtan Gravel	Nominated	
Canadian Screen Awards	2015	Best Make-Up	Colleen Quinton	Nominated	
