= Sitiados: México =

- Genre: Historical drama
- Created by: Willy Van Broock
- Written by: Carmen Gloria López
- Directed by: Álvaro Curiel; Sebastián del Amo
- Starring: Alfonso Herrera; Eréndira Ibarra; Juan Manuel Bernal
- Music by: Federico Jusid
- Country of origin: Mexico
- Original language: Spanish
- No. of seasons: 1
- No. of episodes: 8

Production
- Production locations: Perote, Veracruz; Morelos, Mexico; Texcoco, Mexico; Chiconcuac de Juárez
- Cinematography: Ignacio Prieto
- Production company: Estudios Teleméxico

Original release
- Network: Fox Premium
- Release: 26 July 2019

Sitiados: México is a Mexican historical drama web television series created by Willy Van Broock, along to Carmen Gloria López. The series is developed by Fox Premium and Estudios Teleméxico. All 8 episodes of the first season became available for streaming on Fox Premium on 26 July 2019. The series is considered an independent production, but in turn is part of the Sitiados series; as a third season set in Mexico. The story revolves around the years 1660 and 1680 between attacks and looting in Veracruz, Mexico. It stars Alfonso Herrera and Eréndira Ibarra.

== Plot ==
The series revolves around the Mexican municipality of Veracruz of the seventeenth century, specifically, 1683. In a world full of pirates, shamans and caste conflicts, the inhabitants of the city will have to seek survival. The protagonist, León (Alfonso Herrera), witnessed the murder of his father when he was young, having been unfairly hanged. 25 years later, he returns to collect revenge and, according to his plan, arrives at the governor's house presenting himself as Lorenzo.

== Cast ==
- Alfonso Herrera as Léon / Lorenzo
- Eréndira Ibarra as Inés
- Juan Manuel Bernal as Damián
- Jorge Antonio Guerrero as Tonahuac
- J.C. Montes-Roldán as René
- Enrique Arreola as Chaval
- Everardo Arzate as Guevara
- Gilberto Barraza as Prieto
- Julio Bracho as Agramonte
- Ari Brickman as Van Hoorn
- Carlos Corona as Dupont
- Juan Pablo de Santiago as Chicahua
- Paulette Hernández as Tania
- Ricardo Kleinbaum as Valenciaga
- Claudio Lafarga as Marcial
- Cassandra Sánchez Navarro as Carmina
- Mauricio Isaac as Miguel
- Tomás Rojas as Comandante Español

=== Guest stars ===
- Javier Díaz Dueñas as Gobernador
- Juan Carlos Colombo as Inquisidor

== Episodes ==
No.	Title	Directed by	Written by	Original release date
1	"El desconocido"	Álvaro Curiel & Sebastián del Amo	Willy Van Broock	26 July 2019
2	"El banquete"	Álvaro Curiel & Sebastián del Amo	Willy Van Broock	26 July 2019
3	"El sitio"	Álvaro Curiel & Sebastián del Amo	Willy Van Broock	26 July 2019
4	"El collar"	Álvaro Curiel & Sebastián del Amo	Willy Van Broock	26 July 2019
5	"La promesa"	Álvaro Curiel & Sebastián del Amo	Willy Van Broock	26 July 2019
6	"El destino"	Álvaro Curiel & Sebastián del Amo	Willy Van Broock	26 July 2019
7	"La venganza"	Álvaro Curiel & Sebastián del Amo	Willy Van Broock	26 July 2019
8	"El ataque"	Álvaro Curiel & Sebastián del Amo	Willy Van Broock	26 July 2019
