= Hubert Hayaud =

Hubert Hayaud (born March 1, 1972) is a French film editor and photographer based in Canada. He is most noted as a two-time Prix Iris nominee for Best Editing, receiving nods at the 15th Jutra Awards in 2013 for Romeo Eleven (Roméo Onze) and at the 18th Quebec Cinema Awards in 2016 for Scratch.

Born and raised in Évreux, Eure, Normandy, he has been based in Montreal, Quebec, since the early 2000s.

In 2025 he received a Canadian Cinema Editors award nomination for his work on the documentary film The Man I Left Behind, which he co-directed with Matthieu Rytz and Larry Towell.

== Selected filmography ==
- Aurelie Laflamme's Diary (Le journal d'Aurélie Laflamme) - 2010
- Romeo Eleven (Roméo Onze) - 2012
- Scratch - 2015
- Happy Face - 2018
- The Fall of Sparta (La chute de Sparte) - 2018
- Saint-Narcisse - 2020
- 1+1+1 Life, Love, Chaos (1+1+1 La vie, l'amour, le chaos)- 2024
- The Man I Left Behind - 2024
- L'Autre - 2026
