= Drunken Birds =

2021 Canadian drama film

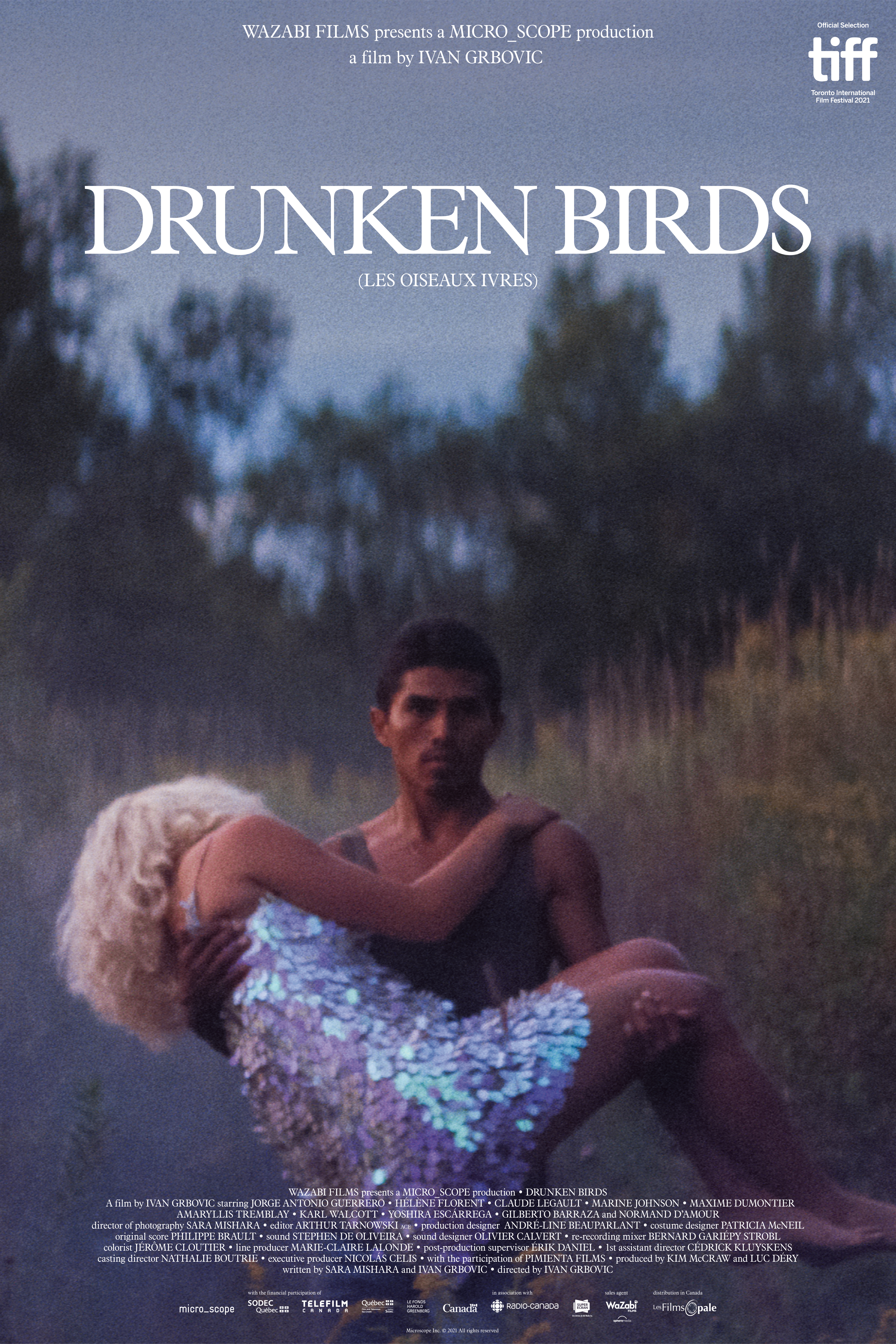
- Official poster
- French: Les Oiseaux ivres
- Directed by: Ivan Grbovic
- Written by: Ivan Grbovic; Sara Mishara
- Produced by: Luc Déry; Kim McCraw
- Starring: Jorge Antonio Guerrero; Hélène Florent; Claude Legault; Marine Johnson
- Cinematography: Sara Mishara
- Edited by: Arthur Tarnowski
- Music by: Philippe Brault
- Production company: micro_scope
- Distributed by: Les Films Opale (Canada); WaZabi Films (World)
- Release date: September 13, 2021 (TIFF)
- Running time: 104 minutes
- Countries: Canada; Mexico
- Languages: French; Spanish

Drunken Birds (French: Les Oiseaux ivres) is a 2021 Canadian drama film directed by Ivan Grbovic who co-wrote with Sara Mishara. The film stars Jorge Antonio Guerrero as Willy, a Mexican drug runner in a crime cartel who travels to Canada in search of his girlfriend Marlena (Yoshira Escárrega) after she disappears, and takes a job as a migrant worker on a farm in the Montérégie region.

The film's cast also includes Hélène Florent, Claude Legault, Marine Johnson, Maxime Dumontier, Amaryllis Tremblay, Karl Walcott, Gilberto Barraza, and Normand D'Amour.

The film premiered at the 2021 Toronto International Film Festival, in the Platform Prize program. The film was digitally and theatrically released in Canada is on October 15, 2021, by Les Films Opale. It was selected as the Canadian entry for the Best International Feature Film at the 94th Academy Awards, but it was not nominated.

== Synopsis ==
Marlena is the young wife of a powerful wealthy man in Mexico, Willy is her secret lover. Fearing the worst, the lovers will flee separately in the hopes of finding each other in a safer place. Willy suspects that Marlena is hiding in Montreal, so he escapes to Quebec where he is hired as a seasonal worker at the Bécotte Farm. While friendships are being forged between foreign workers on the farm, a gap is growing between the Bécotte family members. Willy, unknowingly, will arouse the desire in Julie, the wife of the owner. The situation will not be without consequences for the group - especially for her estranged teenage daughter Léa, who soon finds herself exploited after running away in search of freedom. Willy is accused of a crime he did not commit, which sends a ripple effect through the lives of all, leading to an eventual redemption.

== Cast ==
- Jorge Antonio Guerrero as Willy
- Hélène Florent as Julie
- Claude Legault as Richard
- Marine Johnson as Léa
- Gilberto Barazza as Storyteller
- Yoshira Escárrega as Marlena
- Amaryllis Tremblay as Lou
- Maxime Dumontier as Benji
- Karl Walcott as Formula One driver
- Normand D'Amour as Normand
- Jorge Martinez Colorado as Antonio

== Reception ==
=== Critical response ===
Drunken Birds has an approval rating of 75% on review aggregator website Rotten Tomatoes, based on 12 reviews, and an average rating of 6.1/10.

Jared Mobarak of The Film Stage gave the film a positive review writing, "Writer/director Ivan Grbovic and co-writer/cinematographer Sara Mishara seamlessly take us back and forth through time so the romance at the center of their Les oiseaux ivres [Drunken Birds] can unfold with mystery and anticipation." Another positive review was written by Pat Mullen for That Shelf: "Exceptionally crafted with its feet firmly planted between two worlds, Drunken Birds represents the best that is happening in Canadian cinema right now. It challenges us to look at the landscape we love and wonder if it looks so golden from another perspective. Drunken Birds is the best film the TIFF Platform competition had to offer this year and a Canadian standout for the year overall."

The film was named to TIFF's annual year-end Canada's Top Ten list for 2021.

=== Awards and nominations ===
Award	Date of ceremony	Category	Recipient(s)	Result	Ref(s)
FICFA	2021	Best Canadian Film	Ivan Grbovic	Won	
Canadian Screen Awards	2022	Best Picture	Luc Déry, Kim McCraw	Nominated	
Canadian Screen Awards	2022	Best Supporting Actor	Claude Legault	Nominated	
Canadian Screen Awards	2022	Best Supporting Actress	Marine Johnson	Nominated	
Canadian Screen Awards	2022	Best Art Direction/Production Design	André-Line Beauparlant	Nominated	
Canadian Screen Awards	2022	Best Cinematography	Sara Mishara	Won	
Canadian Screen Awards	2022	Best Editing	Arthur Tarnowski	Nominated	
Vancouver Film Critics Circle	2021	Best Actor in a Canadian Film	Jorge Antonio Guerrero	Nominated	
Prix Iris	2022	Best Film	Luc Déry, Kim McCraw	Won	
Prix Iris	2022	Best Director	Ivan Grbovic	Won	
Prix Iris	2022	Best Actress	Hélène Florent	Won	
Prix Iris	2022	Best Supporting Actor	Claude Legault	Won	
Prix Iris	2022	Best Supporting Actress	Marine Johnson	Nominated	
Prix Iris	2022	Revelation of the Year	Jorge Antonio Guerrero	Nominated	
Prix Iris	2022	Best Screenplay	Ivan Grbovic, Sara Mishara	Won	
Prix Iris	2022	Best Art Direction	André-Line Beauparlant	Nominated	
Prix Iris	2022	Best Costume Design	Patricia McNeil	Nominated	
Prix Iris	2022	Best Cinematography	Sara Mishara	Won	
Prix Iris	2022	Best Editing	Arthur Tarnowski	Won	
Prix Iris	2022	Best Original Music	Philippe Brault	Won	
Prix Iris	2022	Best Sound	Olivier Calvert, Stephen de Oliveira, Bernard Gariépy Strobl	Won	
Prix Iris	2022	Best Makeup	Marie-Josée Galibert	Nominated	
Prix Iris	2022	Best Casting	Nathalie Boutrie	Won	
Prix Iris	2022	Public Prize	Luc Déry, Kim McCraw	Nominated	
Prix collégial du cinéma québécois	2022	Best Film	Drunken Birds	Nominated	

== See also ==
- List of submissions to the 94th Academy Awards for Best International Feature Film
- List of Canadian submissions for the Academy Award for Best International Feature Film
