= Henri Henri =

- Film poster
- Directed by: Martin Talbot
- Written by: Martin Talbot
- Produced by: Christian Larouche; Caroline Héroux
- Starring: Victor Andrés Trelles Turgeon; Sophie Desmarais; Marcel Sabourin; Michel Perron
- Cinematography: Mathieu Laverdière
- Edited by: Arthur Tarnowski
- Music by: Patrick Lavoie
- Release date: November 7, 2014
- Running time: 100 minutes
- Country: Canada
- Language: French

Henri Henri is a Canadian film from Quebec, released in 2014. A quirky comedy described by the Montreal Gazette as an attempt to create "Quebec's own Amélie", the film is the feature debut of television and documentary director Martin Talbot.

The film stars Victor Andrés Trelles Turgeon as the title character Henri Henri, an orphan who was raised and lives in a convent in Montreal. He finds his life turned upside down when the nuns sell the convent to a real estate developer, forcing Henri to move out and learn how to make his way in the outside world.

The film garnered six Canadian Screen Award nominations at the 3rd Canadian Screen Awards, in the categories of Best Cinematography (Mathieu Laverdière), Best Costume Design (Francesca Chamberland), Best Editing (Arthur Tarnowski), Best Sound Editing (Christian Rivest), Best Original Score (Patrick Lavoie) and Best Makeup (Lizanne Lasalle).
