= Rachel Mwanza =

Congolese Actress (born 1997)

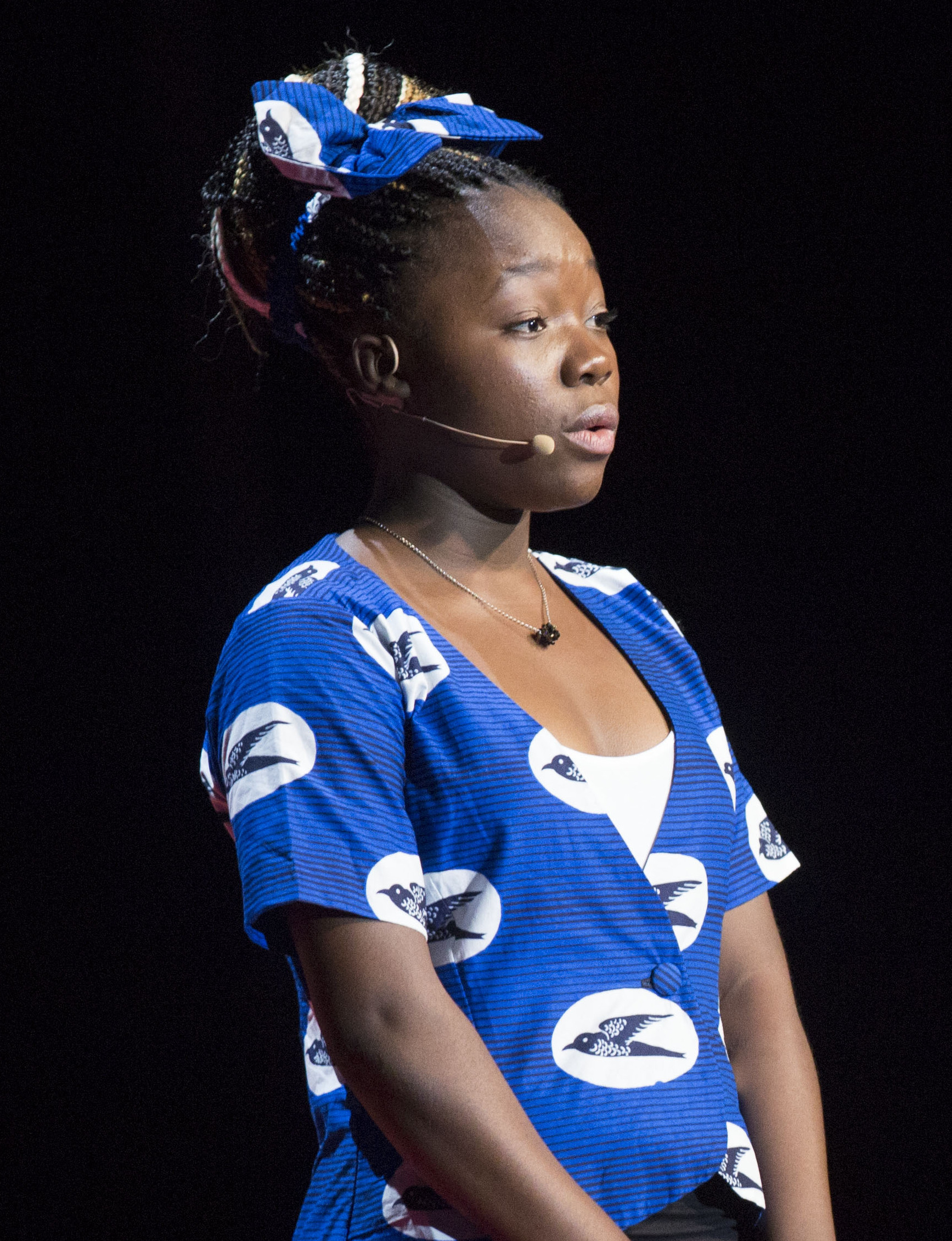
- Rachel Mwanza at a TEDx presentation in Paris, October 2014
- Born: 1997 (age 28–29); Kasai Province, Democratic Republic of the Congo
- Occupation: Actress
- Years active: 2013-present
- Notable work: War Witch

Rachel Mwanza is an actress from the Democratic Republic of the Congo, best known for her performance as Komona in the 2012 film War Witch (Rebelle) for which she won the Silver Bear for Best Actress. Prior to being cast in the film, she was homeless and living on the streets of Kinshasa.

== Early life ==
Mwanza was born in 1997 in Mbuji-Mayi, the third of six siblings, and spent her early childhood in Kasai Province. Her father dispatched her mother and siblings to Kinshasa when she was eight years old, promising to rejoin them later. There, the children no longer attended school, and her mother held her responsible for the family's misfortune after a false prophet stated Mwanza was a witch. He charged her mother for attempted exorcisms to rid Mwanza of witchcraft, but eventually she was thrown out on the street.

Mwanza spent several years living as a street child in Kinshasa before being cast in the Canadian film War Witch (Rebelle). She also appeared in the 2013 film Kinshasa Kids written and directed by Marc-Henri Wajnberg.

She later moved to Montreal, where she attended the high school École Lucien-Pagé and lived with the family of Anne-Marie Gélinas, the associate film producer for War Witch.

== Acting career ==
Mwanza was cast in Rebelle after director Kim Nguyen and producers Pierre Even and Marie-Claude Poulin saw her in a documentary film on the street kids of Kinshasa. Due to her lack of education, she did not know how to read or write when she was first cast in the film; the filmmakers have since made arrangements to pay for her education and housing until she turns 18. In February 2013, she was granted a visa to allow her to attend the Academy Awards, as it was the Canadian entry for the Academy Award for Best Foreign Language Film. The visit combined attendance at the awards along with promotion work for Rebelle while she was in the United States.

Mwanza's performance in Rebelle garnered her awards including the Silver Bear for Best Actress from the Berlin Film Festival, the Tribeca Film Festival and the Vancouver Film Critics Circle in 2012, as well as the award for Best Actress at the 1st Canadian Screen Awards and Québec Cinéma.

Mwanza subsequently wrote a book titled Survivre pour voir ce jour, describing her childhood and experiences in the hope that it would both inspire young people but also bring attention to the 20,000 children who live on the streets of Kinshasa.

Her later performances have included the Belgian film Third Wedding (Troisièmes noces) in 2018.
