= The Masters of Suspense =

- French: Les Maîtres du suspense
- Directed by: Stéphane Lapointe
- Written by: Stéphane Lapointe
- Produced by: Pierre Even; Marie-Claude Poulin
- Starring: Michel Côté; Robin Aubert; Antoine Bertrand
- Cinematography: Jean-François Lord
- Edited by: Nathalie Lysight
- Music by: Benoît de Villeneuve
- Production company: Item 7
- Distributed by: Les Films Séville
- Release date: December 17, 2014
- Running time: 101 minutes
- Country: Canada
- Language: French

The Masters of Suspense (French: Les Maîtres du suspense) is a 2014 Canadian film directed by Stéphane Lapointe.

== Plot ==
Hubert Wolfe (Michel Côté), an author of detective novels, has used the services of Dany Cabana (Robin Aubert) for several years, as a ghostwriter. When the Cabana runs out of inspiration, he hires Quentin Wilson (Antoine Bertrand), his son's teacher, as a second ghost writer. Wolfe's next book Paradise Zombie is announced and impatiently awaited by its publisher, but things get complicated when Quentin, until then inhibited and infantilized by his mother, has to write a sex scene. Since he lacks experience, Dany sets a sexual trap for him with an accomplice prostitute.
