= We Had It Coming =

2019 Canadian film

- Film poster
- Directed by: Paul Barbeau
- Written by: Paul Barbeau
- Produced by: Paul Barbeau; Melissa A. Smith
- Starring: Natalie Krill; Alexia Fast; Erin Agostino
- Cinematography: Benoit Jones-Vallée
- Edited by: Laurent Bernier
- Music by: Daniel Birch
- Production companies: Reprise Films; Fairmount Films
- Distributed by: MK2 Mile End
- Release date: December 6, 2019 (Whistler)
- Running time: 84 minutes
- Country: Canada
- Language: English

We Had It Coming is a Canadian vigilante thriller drama film, directed by Paul Barbeau and released in 2019.

== Plot ==
Katja commits suicide after being recruited into a prostitution ring and coerced if she attempts to leave. Anna, Katja's older sister, a security guard working in a grade school, sets out to Montreal with her girlfriend Olivia to track down those responsible. She ends up in a cat and mouse chase with a female recruiter who grooms young girls for a pimp named Jack. Anna discovers the location of Jack's den, where he hides women. Anna takes a gun to the hideout. It is discharged once, leaving it ambiguous if she shot either the recruiter or Jack.

== Cast ==
- Natalie Krill as Anna
- Alexia Fast as Olivia
- Sofie Holland as Katja
- Erin Agostino as Recruiter
- Nabil Khatib as Jack
- Sarah-Anne Parent as Karina

== Production ==
The film was originally conceived by Barbeau as centred around a male protagonist, but he subsequently decided to complete the screenplay with a woman for the lead role instead.

== Release ==
The film premiered at the 2019 Whistler Film Festival, before going into commercial release in 2020.

At Whistler, Krill was one of four recipients, alongside Andrew Dunbar, Ryan McDonald and Andrea Stefancikova, of the Stars to Watch award. The film had its international premiere at the Prague International Film Festival (Febiofest) in the Panorama section.

The film received positive reviews with Bradley Gibson from Film Threat giving it a 9/10 where he writes "...there is no wasted motion, stripped down to essential elements, with a fierce woman protagonist" calling the film " Brilliant." Francois Lévesque from Le Devoir, gave the film 4 Stars and stated, "We Had It Coming, is a perfect example of what can be accomplished with a strong point a view even with very limited means. "
