= Marie-Claude Poulin =

Canadian film and television producer

- Born: Quebec, Canada
- Occupation: Producer

Marie-Claude Poulin is a Canadian film and television producer from Quebec. Formerly a partner with Pierre Even in Item 7 from 2009 to 2016, she left that firm in 2016 to launch her own company, MCP Productions, before joining Sphere Media in 2021.

She won a Canadian Screen Award as producer of War Witch (Rebelle), the Best Motion Picture winner at the 1st Canadian Screen Awards in 2013. She was also a producer of the Best Picture nominees Café de Flore at the 32nd Genie Awards in 2011, and Brooklyn at the 4th Canadian Screen Awards in 2016.

War Witch was also the winner of the Jutra Award for Best Film at the 15th Jutra Awards in 2013, and The Dishwasher (Le Plongeur) was a nominee at the 25th Quebec Cinema Awards in 2023.

== Filmography ==
- Aftermath - 2002
- White Coats - 2004
- Let It Ride - 2006
- Café de Flore - 2011
- War Witch (Rebelle) - 2012
- Mars & Avril - 2012
- Cyanide - 2013
- The Colony - 2013
- Three Night Stand - 2013
- Meetings with a Young Poet - 2013
- Miraculum - 2014
- The Masters of Suspense (Les maîtres du suspense) - 2014
- Brooklyn - 2015
- Boundaries (Pays) - 2016
- A Kid (Le Fils de Jean) - 2016
- Eye on Juliet - 2017
- Skin - 2018
- Death of a Ladies' Man - 2020
- The Curse of Audrey Earnshaw - 2020
- Ride Above (Tempête) - 2022
- The Dishwasher (Le Plongeur) - 2023
- Agression armée—2023
- 1995 - 2024
