= The Handout =

- French: Autrui
- Directed by: Micheline Lanctôt
- Screenplay by: Micheline Lanctôt; Hubert-Yves Rose
- Produced by: Paul Barbeau
- Starring: Robin Aubert; Brigitte Pogonat
- Cinematography: Nicolas Canniccioni
- Edited by: Aube Foglia
- Music by: Philip Glass
- Production company: Reprise Films
- Distributed by: Métropole Films
- Release date: February 27, 2015 (RVCQ)
- Running time: 99 minutes
- Country: Canada
- Language: French

The Handout (French: Autrui) is a Canadian drama film, directed by Micheline Lanctôt and released in 2015. The film stars Robin Aubert as Éloi, a homeless man who is drawn into a complicated relationship with Lucie (Brigitte Pogonat), an aimless young woman who tries to help him.

The film premiered at the 2015 Rendez-vous du cinéma québécois, prior to opening commercially a few days later.
