= Bestiaire =

- Film poster
- Directed by: Denis Côté
- Written by: Denis Côté
- Produced by: Sylvain Corbeil; Denis Côté
- Cinematography: Vincent Biron
- Edited by: Nicolas Roy
- Production companies: Metafilms; Le Fresnoy - Studio national des arts contemporains nihilproductions
- Distributed by: FunFilm
- Release date: January 22, 2012 (Sundance)
- Running time: 72 minutes
- Countries: Canada; France
- Language: No dialogue

Bestiaire is a 2012 Canadian-French experimental docufiction film written and directed by Denis Côté. Filmed at Parc Safari in Quebec, the film examines human and animal observation without dialogue. It had its world premiere at the 2012 Sundance Film Festival and was nominated for Best Documentary Film at the 15th Jutra Awards.

== Synopsis ==
The film observes animals, staff and visitors at Parc Safari in Quebec. It uses fixed-camera images of animal enclosures, visitor areas and work behind the scenes, including a section involving taxidermy. The film focuses on acts of looking and interpretation rather than on conventional narration.

== Production ==
The film was produced by Metafilms, nihilproductions and Le Fresnoy, and had a budget of a few thousand dollars. It was filmed at Parc Safari in Hemmingford, Quebec. The film has no dialogue.

== Release ==
The film had its world premiere at the 2012 Sundance Film Festival. It had its European premiere in the Forum section of the 2012 Berlin International Film Festival.

The film was released theatrically on April 6, 2012. It also opened in a single theatre in Paris. FunFilm Distribution handled distribution, and the film has been available on DVD since December 4, 2012.

== Reception ==
=== Critical response ===
Peter Debruge of Variety described the film as a "brief yet slow-building visual essay" built from "artfully framed, static-camera compositions". He wrote that the film looked at how humans observe animals, but thought its focus on one facility was too narrow.

Mark Olsen of the Los Angeles Times wrote that the film had "a meditative calm" and found it "remarkable and engaging" for its close views of animals. He praised Côté’s visual approach, noting that the fixed camera was paired with "masterful" compositions.

Michał Oleszczyk of Slant Magazine wrote that the film had a "wordless, unlovely splendor" and argued that the film avoided anthropomorphizing its animal subjects, instead using the zoo setting to examine the human gaze directed at nature.

=== Awards and nominations ===
The film was nominated for Best Documentary Film at the 15th Jutra Awards. It was also a finalist for the Toronto Film Critics Association's Rogers Best Canadian Film Award.
