= I, Pet Goat II =

- Directed by: Louis Lefebvre
- Written by: Louis Lefebvre
- Produced by: Louis Lefebvre
- Edited by: Louis Lefebvre
- Music by: Tanuki Project
- Production company: Heliofant
- Release date: June 24, 2012
- Running time: 7 minutes
- Budget: $500,000

I, Pet Goat II is a 2012 Canadian animated short film written, directed, produced and edited by Louis Lefebvre. The title is a reference to "The Pet Goat", the book George W. Bush read to children at a school in Sarasota, Florida at the time of the September 11 attacks.

The film is a commentary on both globalism and American post 9/11 society and politics, infused with religious and occult imagery. Presidents George W. Bush and Barack Obama are presented as main characters, alongside the gnostic Christ with allusions to Osama bin Laden, the war on terror, Biblical theology, and Egyptian mythology in a post-apocalyptic setting. The film is known for its strong use of cryptic symbolism and referencing Lefebvre's belief in the Illuminati and 9/11 trutherism. I, Pet Goat II continues to be discussed online, with Lew Rockwell describing it as the "granddaddy of conspiracy cartoons".

== Development ==
Louis Lefebvre began production on I, Pet Goat II in 2006. By 2008, he had established his studio, Heliofant, in Montreal, Quebec, employing various 3D animators, and the Tanuki Project, who scored the film. I, Pet Goat II was released on June 24, 2012.

Lefebvre stated in an interview with Webneel that he had sought to create images that came to him without necessarily understanding their meaning during the creative process:

I had always been interested in spiritual traditions and philosophies and it's as if I felt that I would find some sort of resolve in this exploration of my internal landscape using all these universal symbols. I felt that I would be lead to a deeper peace. Throughout the process I tried not to let my intellect get in the way, choosing to let the images pass through me even if I didn't fully understand them on a conscious level rather than censoring everything, even if I was a bit shocked by some of the imagery. I followed the story in its visual form. When things made sense visually and rhythmically, I went with that. In the course of doing this work I have found many explanations for all the micro stories and I have had many other people give me various other explanations. I think it works well that way – evoking different things for different people.

Lefebvre predominantly used Autodesk Maya, V-Ray, FumeFX and RealFlow software for rendering sprites and animation. He hired several dance teachers at a Montreal university to motion capture the dancers who appear in the film.

== Reception ==
SUFI Journal said, "bringing together dancers, musicians, visual artists and 3d animators, the film takes a critical look at the events of the past decade that have shaped our world, and visualises a global-scale spiritual awakening featuring spiritual entities from various cultures across the world."

Amid Amidi, the editor of Cartoon Brewf, commented, "The sophisticated production design stirs mo-cap and keyframe animation into a mesmerizing Surrealist soup that is hard to stop looking at. Conversely, the film's occult and spiritual symbolism–cataloged in excruciating detail on the company's website–is almost embarrassing, like peering into the mind of a precocious high schooler who thinks he understands the world."

== Awards ==
I, Pet Goat II won the following awards:

- Ocelot Robot Film Festival 2012 - Best Short Film
- Fubiz - Best of 2012 (14th of 100)
- The Future of Animation - The Short of the Week Award
- 4th International Animated Short Film Festival "Ciné court animé" (Roanne) - 3D Movie Creation Best Film Distinction
- Bitfilm Festival - 3D Film Award
- Toronto Animation Arts Festival International
- Short Shorts Film Festival & Asia 2013
- 20th Granada Short film festival - International Competition
