= Mesnak =

2011 film

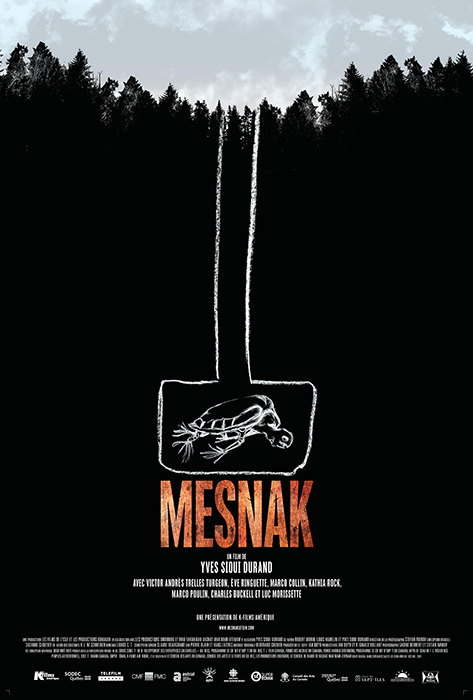
- Directed by: Yves Sioui Durand
- Written by: Louis Hamelin; Robert Morin; Yves Sioui Durand
- Produced by: Réginald Vollant; Ian Boyd
- Starring: Victor Andrés Trelles Turgeon; Ève Ringuette; Kathia Rock; Marco Collin
- Cinematography: Stefan Ivanov
- Edited by: Louise Côté
- Music by: Bertrand Chénier
- Production companies: Kunakan Productions; Les Films de l'Isle
- Release date: November 11, 2011 (imagineNATIVE)
- Running time: 96 minutes
- Country: Canada
- Languages: French; Innu-aimun

Mesnak is a Canadian drama film, directed by Yves Sioui Durand and released in 2011.

The first feature film written and directed by an indigenous filmmaker from Quebec, the film stars Victor Andrés Trelles Turgeon as Dave, a young man of Innu origin who was adopted by parents who raised him with no connection to his First Nations heritage. He receives an unexpected invitation to return home to his birthplace, only to learn that he was invited because his birth mother Gertrude (Kathia Rock) is about to marry Claude (Marco Collin), the corrupt band chief who is taking kickbacks from a forestry company to support a logging development on the band's land. Meanwhile, he befriends Osalic (Ève Ringuette), a young woman in the community who is being victimized by sexual abuse, and tries to help her achieve her dream of escaping the community for a better life.

The film was partially inspired by William Shakespeare's play Hamlet. Its cast also includes musician Florent Vollant in a small role as a homeless man; some of Vollant's music is used in the film's soundtrack.

The film premiered in October 2011 at the imagineNATIVE Film and Media Arts Festival, before opening commercially in early 2012.

Ringuette received a Prix Jutra nomination for Best Supporting Actress at the 15th Jutra Awards in 2013. The film won three awards at the 2012 American Indian Film Festival, for Best Film, Best Actor (Trelles Turgeon) and Best Actress (Ringuette).
