= War Witch =

2012 Canadian war film

- Film poster
- French: Rebelle
- Directed by: Kim Nguyen
- Written by: Kim Nguyen
- Produced by: Pierre Even; Marie-Claude Poulin
- Starring: Rachel Mwanza; Serge Kanyinda; Alain Lino Mic Eli Bastien
- Cinematography: Nicolas Bolduc
- Edited by: Richard Comeau
- Distributed by: Métropole Films
- Release dates: 17 February 2012 (Berlin); October 2012 (Canada)
- Running time: 90 minutes
- Country: Canada
- Languages: French; Lingala
- Box office: $70,544

War Witch (French: Rebelle, lit. 'Rebel') is a 2012 Canadian war drama written and directed by Kim Nguyen and starring Rachel Mwanza, Alain Lino Mic Eli Bastien and Serge Kanyinda. It is about a child soldier forced into a civil war in Africa, and who is believed to be a witch. The film was primarily shot in the Democratic Republic of the Congo in French and Lingala.

After premiering at the 62nd Berlin International Film Festival, the film received positive reviews. It won several honours, including ten at the 1st Canadian Screen Awards, notably Best Motion Picture. War Witch was also nominated for the Academy Award for Best International Feature Film.

== Plot ==
During a civil war in sub-Saharan Africa, a 12-year-old girl named Komona is abducted by a rebel group who raided her village to become a child soldier under a warlord known as the Great Tiger. The rebels compel Komona to kill her own parents. Then, she is sailed to a deserted island with many more children. They are used as porters, then taught to use automatic weapons and forced to go to war with the rebels. After drinking tree sap, she begins to experience vivid hallucinations. When her visions enable her to survive an attack, she is considered to be a child witch and is viewed as an asset by the Great Tiger.

Komona and her young love interest, a boy with albinism known as Magician, eventually escape the rebels and move to live with her uncle. He hopes to marry her, and she asks him to capture a rare white rooster to secure her agreement. He does so but she is tracked down and kidnapped by one of the Great Tiger's commanders, and Magician is killed. After Komona becomes the commander's concubine, she kills him and runs away to her uncle, narrating her life story to her fetus. On the way to her hometown, to bury her parents who have been haunting her, she gives birth to a baby boy whom she names after the magician.

== Cast ==
- Rachel Mwanza as Komona
- Alain Lino Mic Eli Bastien as Commandant-rebelle
- Serge Kanyinda as Magician
- Mizinga Mwinga as Grand Tigre Royal
- Ralph Prosper as Boucher
- Jean Kabuya as School camp coach
- Jupiter Bokondji as Royal Tiger sorcerer
- Starlette Mathata as Komona's mother
- Alex Herabo as Komona's father
- Dole Malalou as Coltan dealer
- Karim Bamaraki as Biker

== Production ==
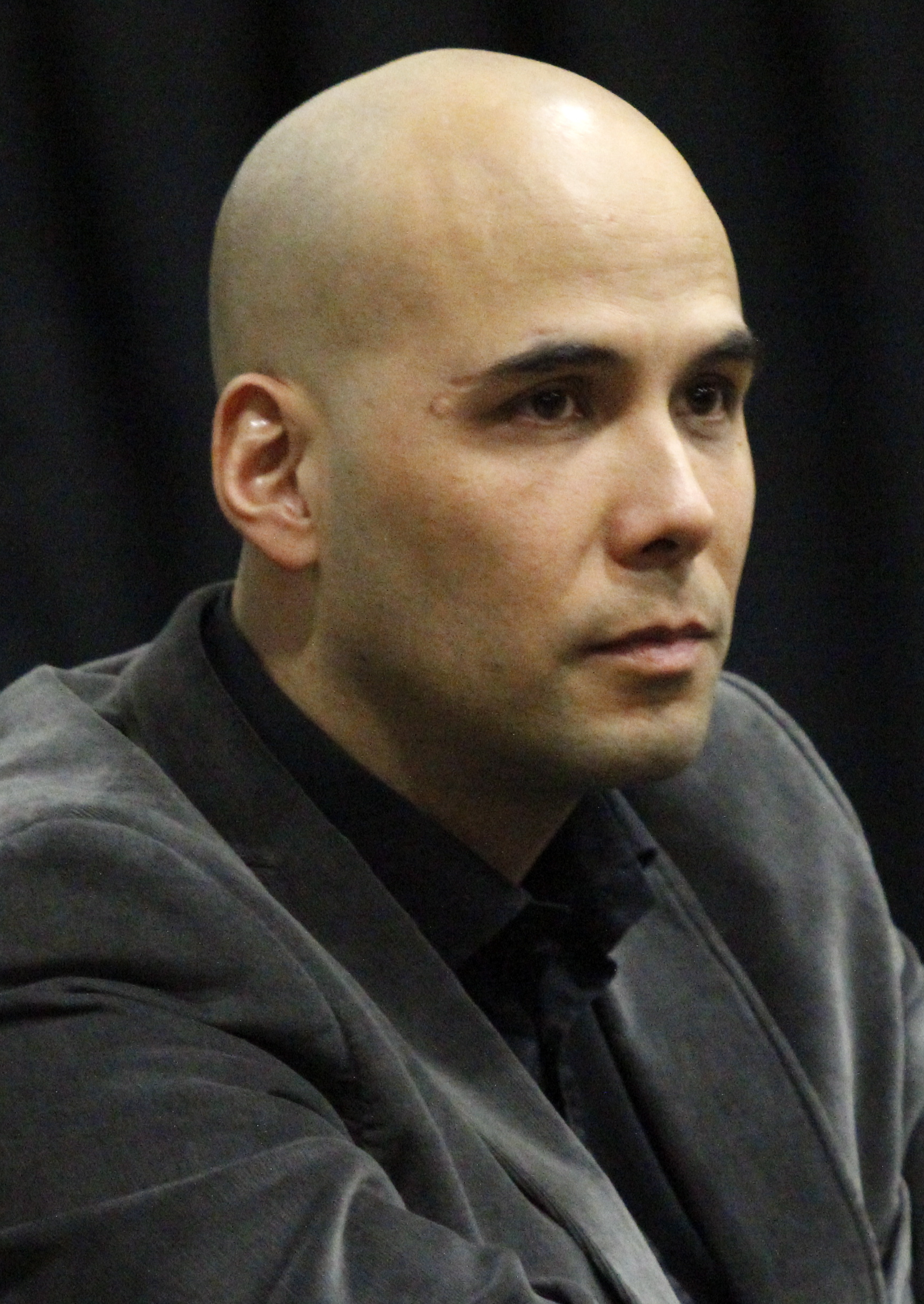
Director Kim Nguyen wrote the screenplay after reading about child soldiers in Burma.

Montreal director Kim Nguyen wrote the screenplay over a period of 10 years, inspired by an article about children in Burma leading a rebellion force. In researching the film, Nguyen met real child soldiers and humanitarian staff. He envisioned his project as "a redemption story about a child who lives through war and peace."

War Witch was primarily filmed in the Democratic Republic of the Congo. Nguyen discovered Rachel Mwanza and numerous other child actors for his cast in Kinshasa, DRC, after open auditions. Mwanza had never acted before, and was 15 by September 2012. Nguyen said that "Rachel was living in the streets before we did the film". Besides the novice Congolese actors, professional Canadian actors joined the cast.

Most of War Witch was filmed in the order of the story. It was only the second film shot in the DRC in 25 years, and due to security concerns, the crew was accompanied by soldiers with AK-47s, and insurance was challenging to obtain.

== Release ==
The film had its debut at the Berlin International Film Festival on 17 February 2012, where it was seen by 1,500 people. Nguyen became the first Canadian to compete for the Silver Bear in 13 years. In the spring, it played in North America for the first time at the Tribeca Film Festival. It also screened from 14 to 15 September at the 2012 Toronto International Film Festival.

It had a limited release in Toronto and Ottawa on 21 September 2012. At Tribeca, distribution rights were sold for the United States.

== Reception ==
=== Critical response ===
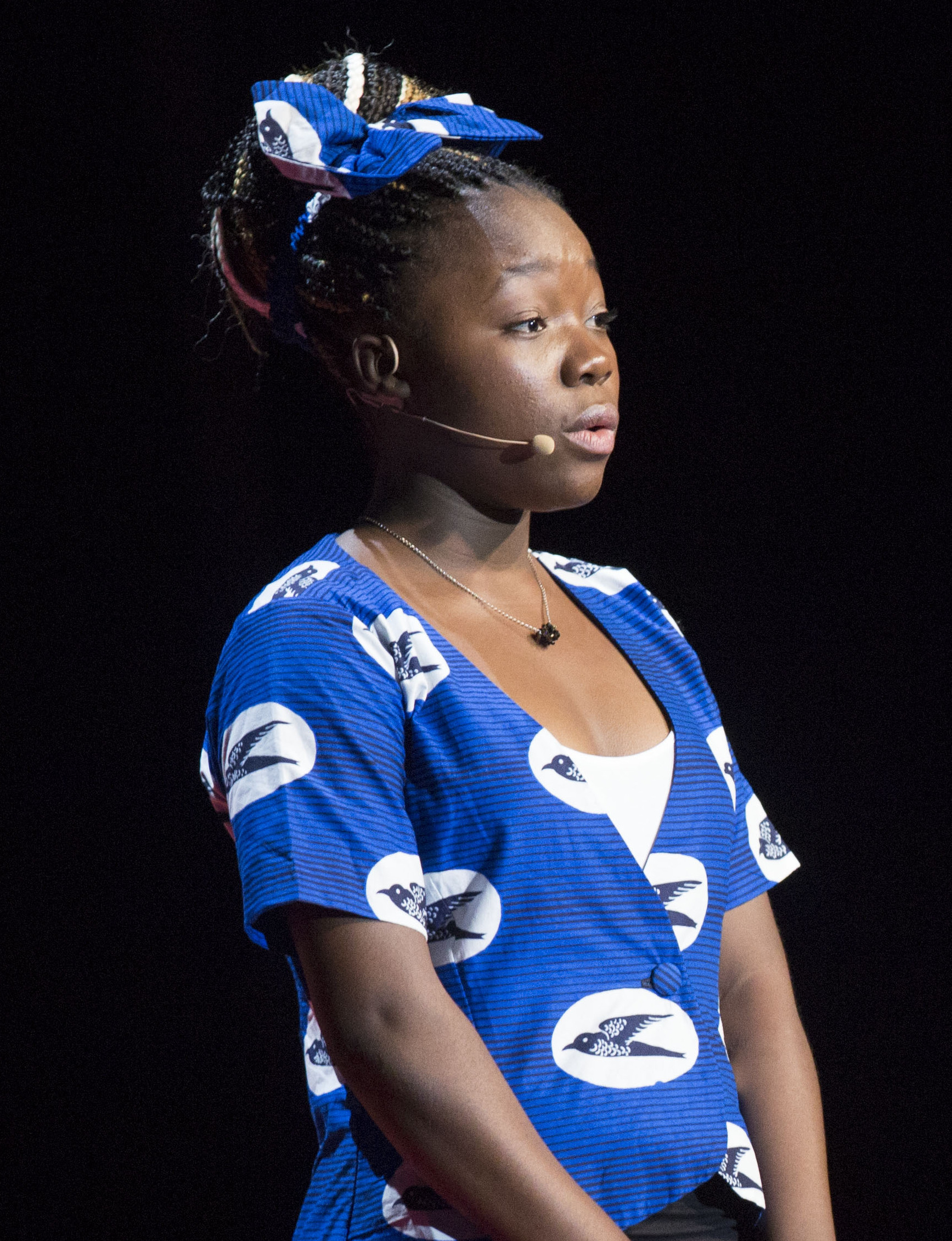
Congolese actress Rachel Mwanza received positive reviews and awards for her performance.

War Witch has a 94% approval rating on Rotten Tomatoes, based on 63 reviews, and an average rating of 8/10. The website's critical consensus states: "War Witch is a mature, intense drama that embraces the bruatlity [sic] of its subject and invites the audience to sympathize with its protagonist's nightmarish circumstances". It also has a score of 84 out of 100 on Metacritic, based on 16 critics, indicating "universal acclaim".

Guy Dixon, writing for The Globe and Mail, gave the film three stars, saying it transcended war films and Rachel Mwanza gave a great performance. The National Post rated it three stars, declaring it "a film you won’t be able to look away from no matter how hard you want to". Jay Stone of The Winnipeg Free Press assessed the film as "harrowing" with "strikingly authentic performances", including from Mwanza.

Stephen Holden's The New York Times review complimented the film for its portrayal of Komona, lacking luridness or smugness. In Variety, Leslie Felperin said the treatment was appropriately "harrowing" for the topic, and positively reviewed Nguyen's aptitude. The Boston Globe's Ty Burr assessed it as "grim yet clear-eyed, and it seeks out glimmers of hope in individual resilience and in the connections that bind us together".

In The Hollywood Reporter, Deborah Young hailed it as an "extraordinary story". University of Berlin film scholar Claudia Kotte wrote War Witch, with Incendies (2010), Monsieur Lazhar (2011) and Inch'Allah (2012), represent a break from focus in the Cinema of Quebec on local history to more global concerns.

=== Accolades ===
The film was Canada's entry in the Best Foreign Language Film category at the 85th Academy Awards.
It was a rare Canadian submission for featuring a substantial amount of Lingala as well as French. It was among nine shortlisted in December 2012, and became one of the five nominees. Mwanza received a visa to allow her to attend the Academy Awards. It was the third consecutive Quebec film nominated, following Incendies and Monsieur Lazhar, with Nguyen proclaiming "People around the world are looking at Quebec cinema now and waiting for the next director to come out of here. This has a tremendous impact on a country’s recognition outside of its borders".

The film was in competition for the Golden Bear at the 62nd Berlin International Film Festival in February 2012.
It also triumphed at the 1st Canadian Screen Awards, which replaced the Genie Awards that year in honouring Canadian film.

Award	Date of ceremony	Category	Recipient(s)	Result	Ref.
Academy Awards	24 February 2013	Best Foreign Language Film	Kim Nguyen	Nominated	
Berlin International Film Festival	9–19 February 2012	Silver Bear for Best Actress	Rachel Mwanza	Won	
Berlin International Film Festival	9–19 February 2012	Ecumenical Jury Special Mention	War Witch	Won	
Cambridge Film Festival	13–23 September 2012	Audience Award for Best Fiction Feature	Kim Nguyen	Won	
Canadian Screen Awards	3 March 2013	Best Motion Picture	Pierre Even, Marie-Claude Poulin	Won	
Canadian Screen Awards	3 March 2013	Best Director	Kim Nguyen	Won	
Canadian Screen Awards	3 March 2013	Best Original Screenplay	Kim Nguyen	Won	
Canadian Screen Awards	3 March 2013	Best Actress	Rachel Mwanza	Won	
Canadian Screen Awards	3 March 2013	Best Supporting Actor	Serge Kanyinda	Won	
Canadian Screen Awards	3 March 2013	Best Art Direction/Production Design	Emmanuel Fréchette, Josée Arsenault	Won	
Canadian Screen Awards	3 March 2013	Best Cinematography	Nicolas Bolduc	Won	
Canadian Screen Awards	3 March 2013	Best Editing	Richard Comeau	Won	
Canadian Screen Awards	3 March 2013	Best Overall Sound	Claude La Haye, Daniel Bisson and Bernard Gariépy Strobl	Won	
Canadian Screen Awards	3 March 2013	Best Sound Editing	Martin Pinsonnault, Jean-François Sauvé, Simon Meilleur and Claire Pochon	Won	
Canadian Screen Awards	3 March 2013	Best Costume Design	Éric Poirier	Nominated	
Canadian Screen Awards	3 March 2013	Best Visual Effects	Ève Brunet, Marc Morissette and Alexandra Vaillancourt	Nominated	
Independent Spirit Awards	February 23, 2013	Best International Film	Kim Nguyen	Nominated	
Jutra Awards	March 2013	Best Film	Pierre Even and Marie-Claude Poulin	Won	
Jutra Awards	March 2013	Best Director	Kim Nguyen	Won	
Jutra Awards	March 2013	Best Screenplay	Kim Nguyen	Won	
Jutra Awards	March 2013	Best Actress	Rachel Mwanza	Won	
Jutra Awards	March 2013	Best Supporting Actor	Serge Kanyinda	Won	
Jutra Awards	March 2013	Best Cinematography	Nicolas Bolduc	Won	
Jutra Awards	March 2013	Best Editing	Richard Comeau	Won	
Jutra Awards	March 2013	Best Sound	Claude La Haye, Martin Pinsonnault and Bernard Gariépy Strobl	Won	
Jutra Awards	March 2013	Best Costume Design	Éric Poirier	Nominated	
Jutra Awards	March 2013	Best International Motion Picture	Kim Nguyen	Nominated	
NAACP Image Award	21–22 February 2014	Outstanding International Motion Picture	Kim Nguyen	Won	
Tribeca Film Festival	April 2012	Best Narrative Feature	Kim Nguyen	Won	
Tribeca Film Festival	April 2012	Best Actress	Rachel Mwanza	Won	
Vancouver Film Critics Circle	2013	Best Canadian Film	Kim Nguyen	Won	
Vancouver Film Critics Circle	2013	Best Actress in a Canadian Film	Rachel Mwanza	Won	
Vancouver Film Critics Circle	2013	Best Supporting Actor in a Canadian Film	Serge Kanyinda	Won	
Vancouver International Film Festival	September 27–October 12, 2012	Best Canadian Feature Film	Kim Nguyen	Nominated	
Prix collégial du cinéma québécois	2013	Best Film	War Witch	Nominated	

== See also ==
- List of submissions to the 85th Academy Awards for Best Foreign Language Film
- List of Canadian submissions for the Academy Award for Best Foreign Language Film
