= Ali Ammar (Canadian actor) =

Canadian actor

- Born: Lebanon
- Occupation: Actor
- Years active: 2012–2013
- Notable work: Romeo Eleven (2011)
- Awards: Jutra Award nominee for Best Actor (2013)

Ali Ammar is a Canadian actor. He is most noted for his performance in the film Romeo Eleven (Roméo Onze), for which he was a Jutra Award nominee for Best Actor at the 15th Jutra Awards in 2013.

Ammar, a native of Lebanon who emigrated to Montreal, Quebec, with his family in childhood, has mild cerebral palsy. At the time of his casting in Romeo Eleven, in which he played a man with a physical disability trying to navigate internet dating, he was a psychology student at Collège Ahuntsic. He has not had any other prominent acting roles since, although he did appear on an episode of the talk show Tout le monde en parle in 2012.
