= Small Blind (film) =

- Film poster
- French: La mise à l'aveugle
- Directed by: Simon Galiero
- Written by: Simon Galiero
- Produced by: Simon Galiero
- Starring: Micheline Bernard; Julien Poulin; Pierre-Luc Brillant
- Cinematography: Nicolas Canniccioni
- Edited by: Simon Galiero
- Music by: Domenico Scarlatti
- Production company: Les Films de l'Autre
- Release date: October 10, 2012 (FNC)
- Running time: 80 minutes
- Country: Canada
- Language: French

Small Blind (French: La mise à l'aveugle) is a Canadian drama film, directed by Simon Galiero and released in 2012. The film stars Micheline Bernard as Denise, a woman rebuilding her life after being divorced by her husband Michel (Julien Poulin) and pushed out of her job with the family company by her son Alex (Pierre-Luc Brillant). Moving into a new apartment, she is initiated into the world of poker by her new neighbours Éric (Marc Fournier), Paul (Louis Sincennes) and Julie (Christine Beaulieu).

The film premiered at the Festival du nouveau cinéma in October 2012, before opening commercially in December.

Bernard received a Prix Jutra nomination for Best Actress at the 15th Jutra Awards in 2013.
