= If I Should Fall =

- Theatrical release poster
- Directed by: Brendon Culliton (director); Dan Heald (co-director)
- Produced by: Paul Culliton (producer); Michael Roberts (executive producer)
- Starring: Marc Diab
- Cinematography: Brendon Culliton
- Edited by: Brendon Culliton
- Music by: Loreena McKennitt
- Release date: December 2010
- Running time: 102 minutes
- Country: Canada
- Language: English

If I Should Fall (full title: If I Should Fall: A True Story of the Afghan War Experience) is a Canadian documentary film about Marc Diab, a Canadian soldier of Lebanese Maronite origin serving in the War in Afghanistan (2001–2021).

== Background ==
Diab was born on 23 September 1986 in Ain Ebel, Lebanon to Hani Diab and Jihan Falah. He had two older sisters, Jessica and Maya. He and his family immigrated to Canada in 2000, and Marc became a Canadian citizen on 11 June 2004. Living in Mississauga, Ontario, he was very active in his community and took part in many church and youth projects.

He later joined the Canadian Forces. While on leave, he regularly returned to his hometown and participated in youth camps, inspiring the children and mentoring them, taking a lot of video footage and photographs. When he left for Afghanistan, a popular Facebook account was created in his support.

He was killed on 8 March 2009 after his vehicle hit an improvised explosive device (IED) in Shah Wali Kot district, Kandahar province. He was just 22 years old and weeks away from coming home. Diab had fallen in love with Mary Barakat, a fellow Lebanese-Canadian, who he had known since their families lived in Lebanon. He had planned to propose and buy an apartment as soon as he returned home from his assignment. He was the 112th Canadian soldier to die in Afghanistan.

There was a huge outpour of grief and support from his community after his death. Trooper Marc Diab Memorial Park was inaugurated in June 2010 in Mississauga, Ontario in his memory. His family and relatives opened a Lebanese restaurant, Madameek, in his memory, just next to his base in Petawawa, Ontario. The restaurant contains memorabilia that once belonged to Diab.

== Synopsis ==
The documentary recounts Diab's life through the accounts of his friends, family, girlfriend, and fellow soldiers from D Squadron, Royal Canadian Dragoons.

Supported by an ensemble of renowned Canadian military experts, including retired Major General Lewis MacKenzie, Esprit de Corps magazine's Scott Taylor, and Major Ray Wiss, a military reservist and emergency room doctor, the film explores the conflict in Afghanistan and the tragedy of losing a loved one to war.

== Production ==
Co-directed by Brendon Culliton, a Canadian film director, and Dan Heald, If I Should Fall is their first long feature documentary film. The film is produced by Joint Media Group Inc (JMGI), a company founded by Culliton with his father Paul Culliton.

JMGI wanted to create a television series called Afghan Diaries two years prior. including an episode on the aftermath of a soldier's death. Executive Producer Michael Roberts had been friends with the Diab family via their Mississauga restaurant and introduced the family to Paul Culliton when Afghan Diaries was in its early stages. Paul Culliton and Roberts felt that they had a lot of excellent material provided by the Diabs and at their suggestion, Brendon Culliton decided to focus on Diab.

The film uses video footage from Diab and other soldiers discussing IEDs, as well as a montage prepared by Diab himself, entitled "See You Tomorrow", for his loved ones in the event he didn't return home alive.

== Music ==
The film features music by award-winning Canadian artist Loreena McKennitt

== Release ==
The documentary premiered in 2012 at the Canadian Embassy in Washington, D.C. before approximately 200 guests, including Pentagon officials. A DVD release (in two versions, the official release version and another version with extended footage in addition to further testimonies) was released with proceeds going to the Marc Diab Children's Foundation and the Military Families' Fund.

== Reception ==
If I Should Fall received favourable reviews, including Peter Worthington of the Toronto Sun who wrote, "Every Canadian should have a chance to see If I Should Fall." Scott Taylor of Esprit de Corps, a Canadian military magazine, said, "This is an authentic story of the Canadian Afghan war experience."

== Awards ==
- 2012: "Best Documentary" at the Toronto Beaches Film Fest, Toronto, Ontario
- 2012: "Audience Award" at the Buffalo Niagara Film Festival, Buffalo, New York
- 2012: "Best Documentary" at the Amelia Island Film Festival, Amelia Island, Florida
- 2011: "Award of Excellence - Documentary Competition" at the Canada International Film Festival, Vancouver, British Columbia
- 2011: "Best Documentary" at the Hamilton Film Festival, Hamilton, Ontario
- 2011: "Best Documentary" at the Silver Wave Film Festival, Fredericton, New Brunswick

Official selections

- 2012: Official Selection, Lebanese Film Festival, Sydney, Australia
- 2012: Official Selection, Ottawa International Film Festival, Ottawa, Ontario
- 2012: Official Selection, GI Film Festival, Washington, DC
- 2012: Official Selection, Canadian Film Fest, Toronto, Ontario
- 2012: Official Selection, Reelworld Film Festival, Toronto, Ontario
- 2012: Official Selection, Belleville International Documentary Film Festival, Belleville, Ontario
- 2011: Official Selection, Brantford International Film Festival, Brantford, Ontario

== See also ==
- Canadian Forces casualties in Afghanistan
- Coalition casualties in Afghanistan
