= Letters from Pyongyang =

- Directed by: Jason Lee
- Release date: 13 November 2012 (RIDM)

Letters from Pyongyang is a 2012 documentary short film (28 minutes) about the filmmaker's search for lost relatives in North Korea, directed by Korean-Canadian filmmaker Jason Lee. The film premiered at the Rencontres internationales du documentaire de Montreal also known by its acronym RIDM on 13 November 2012. The international premiere in Doha, Qatar during the 9th Aljazeera International Documentary Film Festival garnered the film the top juried prize, the Aljazeera Golden Award, in the short film category.

Letters from Pyongyang subsequently received the Best Documentary jury prize at the 23rd Palm Springs International ShortFest in Palm Springs, California and the Best Short Film jury prize at the Toronto Reel Asian International Film Festival in Toronto, Canada.
