= Romeo Eleven =

2011 film

- Film poster
- French: Roméo Onze
- Directed by: Ivan Grbovic
- Written by: Ivan Grbovic; Sara Mishara
- Produced by: Paul Barbeau
- Starring: Ali Ammar
- Cinematography: Sara Mishara
- Edited by: Hubert Hayaud
- Music by: Charles Ives; Hans Otter; Lucas Yeague
- Production company: Reprise Films
- Distributed by: Métropole Films
- Release date: 7 July 2011 (Karlovy)
- Running time: 91 minutes
- Country: Canada
- Language: French

Romeo Eleven (French: Roméo Onze) is a 2011 Canadian drama film directed by Ivan Grbovic, and written by Grbovic and Sara Mishara.

Set in Montreal's Lebanese Christian community, the film is a coming-of-age story about a physically handicapped 20-year-old man who must face his insecurities about his disability when he is invited out on a date by a woman he has been chatting with on the internet.

The film had its theatrical premiere at the Karlovy Vary International Film Festival in July 2011, and its Canadian premiere at the 2011 Toronto International Film Festival, before going into commercial release in 2012.

== Cast ==
- Ali Ammar as Rami
- Joseph Bou Nassar as Ziad
- Sanda Bourenane as Sabine
- Eleonore Millier
- May Hilal
- Caline Habib as Nada
- Ziad Ghanem as Bassam
- Karim Traiaia as Martin
- Inka Malovic as Hostess

== Accolades ==
Award	Date of ceremony	Category	Recipient(s)	Result	Ref(s)
Jutra Awards	March 17, 2013	Best Film	Paul Barbeau	Nominated	
Jutra Awards	March 17, 2013	Best Director	Ivan Grbovic	Nominated	
Jutra Awards	March 17, 2013	Best Actor	Ali Ammar	Nominated	
Jutra Awards	March 17, 2013	Best Screenplay	Ivan Grbovic, Sara Mishara	Nominated	
Jutra Awards	March 17, 2013	Best Editing	Hubert Hayaud	Nominated	
Prix collégial du cinéma québécois	2013	Best Film	Romeo Eleven	Nominated	
