= Birthmarked (film) =

- Theatrical release poster
- Directed by: Emanuel Hoss-Desmarais
- Screenplay by: Marc Tulin
- Story by: Marc Tulin; Emmanuel Hoss-Desmarais
- Produced by: Pierre Even
- Starring: Matthew Goode; Toni Collette; Andreas Apergis; Jordan Poole; Megan O'Kelly; Anton Gillis-Adelman; Michael Smiley; Suzanne Clément; Fionnula Flanagan
- Cinematography: Josée Deshaies
- Edited by: Arthur Tarnowski
- Music by: Stephen Rennicks
- Production companies: Item 7; Parallel Films; Aqute Media
- Distributed by: Vertical Entertainment; Entertainment One
- Release dates: March 30, 2018 (United States); May 25, 2018 (Canada)
- Running time: 90 minutes
- Countries: United States; Canada
- Language: English

Birthmarked is a 2018 Irish-Canadian comedy film directed by Emanuel Hoss-Desmarais, from a screenplay by Marc Tulin, and based on a story by Hoss-Desmarais and Tulin. It stars Matthew Goode, Toni Collette, Andreas Apergis, Jordan Poole, Megan O'Kelly, Anton Gillis-Adelman, Michael Smiley, Suzanne Clément and Fionnula Flanagan.

The film was produced by Item 7 in Canada in co-production Parallel Films. The film was released in the United States in a limited release and on video on demand on March 30, 2018, by Vertical Entertainment. It was released in Canada on May 25, 2018, by Entertainment One.

== Plot ==
In 1977, Ben and Catherine, two respected scientists, leave their jobs to conduct an experiment into human identity. They aim to raise three children contrarily to their genetic predispositions, to prove the ultimate power of nurture over nature.

The parents get funding from Gertz to be able to carry out their experiment. The children are homeschooled to maximize control of the study. Samsonov, hired by Gertz, is a former Olympic athlete and trained psychologist, who helps to care for the kids and regularly keeps a log to report back to him.

Luke is their birth child, and raised to be artistic. He is encouraged to respond artistically to situations and emotions. Maya, adopted from people with a low level of studies, is raised to have a very high academic level. She's given a special diet for intellectual growth. Maurice comes from angry, aggressive people, and is raised to be a pacifist. He meditates daily.

Every six months, Gertz comes to visit and test. At the 12 year mark, he comes with a warning to get much better results soon or he'll pull the plug.

After a psychologist friend of Ben and Catherine takes the kids on a day trip, deeming them normal, the kids start planning an escape by car. Gertz then returns to pressure the pair further, causing Ben to use an extreme method to teach Maya, which snowballs into a huge argument with Catherine, and in turn the kids try to run off in the car. They cause a huge pile up on the highway, prompting social services to take them.

Gertz threatens them, insisting that they either pay him over a million for breach of contract or sign a release for him to write about the experiment, admitting to the couple that he’s actually been experimenting on them the entire time. Once the book is released, the kids are shocked and humiliated, and their parents try to break them out of the school. When they are unsuccessful, they go to Gertz's and Ben hits him in the face with a shovel. Ben is jailed but released a short time later, thanks to Mrs. Tridek, and not long after they are invited to a video montage by Luke, showing all is forgiven.

In the closing, we find out Luke has become a film director, Maya has chosen to explore the world and become an activist for the Animal Liberation Front and Maurice is a lawyer for the Women's Wrestling Federation. Their parents are not together but amicable, enjoying their seven grandchildren.

== Cast ==
- Matthew Goode as Ben
- Toni Collette as Catherine
- Andreas Apergis as Samsonov
- Jordan Poole as Luke
- Megan O'Kelly as Maya
- Anton Gillis-Adelman as Maurice
- Michael Smiley as Gertz
- Suzanne Clément as Dr. Julie Bouchard
- Fionnula Flanagan as Mrs. Tridek

== Production ==
In December 2016, it was announced Toni Collette, Matthew Goode, Andreas Apergis, Michael Smiley, Fionnula Flanagan and Suzanne Clément had joined the cast of the film, with Emanuel Hoss-Desmarais directing from a screenplay by Marc Tulin. Pierre Even produced alongside Susan Mullen, under their Item 7 and Parallel Film Productions banners, respectively. Entertainment One distributes in Canada.

=== Filming ===
Principal photography began in December 2016, in Montreal, Canada.

== Release ==
The film was released in the United States in a limited release and through video on demand on March 30, 2018, by Vertical Entertainment. It was released in Canada on May 25, 2018. The film is now widely available on streaming platform Netflix.

=== Critical reception ===
Birthmarked received negative reviews from film critics. It holds an 11% approval rating on review aggregator website Rotten Tomatoes, based on 18 reviews, with an average of 4.8/10. On Metacritic, the film holds a rating of 44 out of 100, based on 6 critics, indicating "mixed or average" reviews.
