= Dominique Quesnel =

Canadian film, stage and television actress

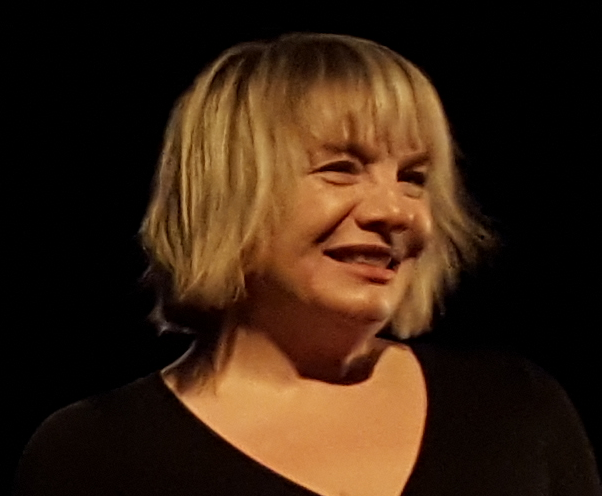
- Born: March 8, 1964 (age 61); Montreal, Quebec, Canada
- Years active: 1980s–present

Dominique Quesnel (born March 8, 1964) is a Canadian actress and musician from Quebec. She is most noted for her performance in the 2012 film The Torrent (Le Torrent), for which she was a Jutra Award nominee for Best Actress at the 15th Jutra Awards in 2013.

A graduate of the National Theatre School of Canada, she began her career on stage in the premiere production of Michel Marc Bouchard's The Orphan Muses (Les muses orphelines). She has had regular roles in film, television and theatre over her career, including in the films 7 Days (Les 7 jours du talion), Widow of Saint-Pierre (La Veuve de Saint-Pierre), Ice Cream, Chocolate and Other Consolations (Crème glacée, chocolat et autres consolations) and Continental, a Film Without Guns (Continental, un film sans fusil).

She was also a founder of the percussion ensemble Les Secrétaires percutantes.
