= Yves Sioui Durand =

Filmmaker and theatre director (born 1951)

Yves Sioui Durand (born May 11, 1951) is a Wendat writer, filmmaker and theatre director from Quebec. A founder of the Ondinnok theatre company, he is an important pioneer of Indigenous theatre in Canada.

Born at Wendake, Quebec, he first became known for his 1983 play Le Porteur des peines du monde, which was later translated into English as The Sun Raiser. He founded the Ondinnok theatre company in 1985, becoming known for a style which blends music, dance and stage design to create a highly image-based style of theatre drawing on Indigenous cultural traditions from throughout North and South America. His later plays have included Atiskenandahate, Voyage to the Land of the Dead (1988), La Conquête de Mexico (1991), UKUAMAQ (1993), Iwouskéa et Tawiskaron (1999) and Kmukamch l'Asierindien (2002).

In 2011 he directed Mesnak, which was the first feature film written and directed by an Indigenous filmmaker from Quebec.

In 2017 he was a recipient of the Governor General's Performing Arts Award.
