= Parc Safari =

- Interactive map of Parc Safari
- 45°02′30″N 73°31′30″W
- Date opened: 1972
- Location: Hemmingford, Quebec, Canada
- Memberships: CAZA
- Website: parcsafari.com

Parc Safari is a zoo and family attraction in Hemmingford, Quebec, Canada. Founded in 1972, the park is one of the major tourist attractions in the Montérégie region and is located near the Canada–United States border.

In 2025, Parc Safari changed ownership after longtime owner Jean-Pierre Ranger sold the park. The new ownership group is associated with Batipart, a Luxembourg-based company active in real estate, tourism and hospitality, which also owns Parc Omega in Montebello, Quebec.

In 2026, the park began a major transition toward a boreal and four-season zoological experience. The new direction emphasizes species better adapted to the Quebec climate and allows the park to operate year-round. As part of this transition, several African species previously associated with the park were relocated to accredited zoological institutions.

The park’s current animal collection includes species such as Highland cattle, Przewalski's horses, bison, elk, deer, fallow deer, mouflon, cougars, snow leopards, lynx, lions, alpacas, meerkats, porcupines, flamingos and emus, among others.

The park includes a drive-through section known as the Safari Aventure, where visitors travel through animal habitats in their own vehicles. Walking areas include the feline tunnels, which allow visitors to observe large cats such as cougars, snow leopards and lynx from protected passageways; the Vallée des daims; and the Ferme des cinq continents.

Parc Safari also offers seasonal and add-on experiences, including aquatic areas with water games and slides, alpaca walks, and a VIP feline experience. The park promotes itself as a family attraction open year-round, with summer attractions including its water park areas.

As of 2026, key staff members include, Aurélien Berthelot, Zoology Director and Randy Smith, Marketing Director.
