= Simon Galiero =

Canadian film director and screenwriter

- Born: July 11, 1978 (age 47); Montreal, Quebec, Canada
- Occupations: Film director, screenwriter
- Years active: 2000s–present

Simon Galiero (born July 11, 1978) is a Canadian film director and a screenwriter from Quebec. He is most noted for his 2007 short film Our Jail Is a Kingdom (Notre prison est un royaume), which won the Jutra Award for Best Live Action Short Film at the 10th Jutra Awards in 2008.

His feature-length debut, Clouds Over the City (Nuages sur la ville), was released in 2009, and won the award for "Best Canadian Film" at that year's Festival du nouveau cinéma. His second feature film, Small Blind (La mise à l'aveugle), was released in 2012.

He has also directed the short films À l'insu du plein gré (2001), Encore dimanche (2002), L'Immigré (2005) and Jean Pierre Lefebvre (2013).
