= The Torrent (2012 film) =

- Film poster
- French: Le torrent
- Directed by: Simon Lavoie
- Written by: Simon Lavoie
- Based on: Le Torrent; 1950 book by Anne Hébert
- Produced by: Jacques Blain; Sylvain Corbeil
- Starring: Victor Andrés Trelles Turgeon; Dominique Quesnel; Laurence Leboeuf
- Cinematography: Mathieu Laverdière
- Edited by: Nicolas Roy
- Music by: Normand Corbeil
- Production company: Lusio Films
- Release date: October 15, 2012 (FNC)
- Running time: 152 minutes
- Country: Canada
- Language: French

The Torrent (French: Le torrent) is a Canadian drama film, directed by Simon Lavoie and released in 2012. An adaptation of Anne Hébert's novella Le Torrent, the film centres on the life of François (played by Anthony Therrien as a child and Victor Andrés Trelles Turgeon as an adult), a man who was raised by his devoutly religious and abusive mother Claudine (Dominique Quesnel). Left deaf when his refusal to obey her demand that he enter the seminary to become a Catholic priest led Claudine to hit him on the head, he has continued to live in rural isolation, and struggles to establish human connection when he purchases Amica (Laurence Leboeuf), a woman being sold into slavery who is eerily similar to his mother in her youth.

The film premiered at the Festival du nouveau cinéma in October 2012.

The film received six Prix Jutra nominations at the 15th Jutra Awards in 2013, for Best Actor (Trelles Turgeon), Best Actress (Quesnel), Best Art Direction (Éric Barbeau), Best Cinematography (Mathieu Laverdière), Best Original Music (Normand Corbeil) and Best Sound (Luc Boudrias, Marcel Chouinard and Patrice Leblanc).

== Cast ==
- Victor Andrés Trelles Turgeon as François
- Laurence Leboeuf as Amica / Claudine (jeune)
- Dominique Quesnel as Claudine
- Anthony Therrien as François (enfant)
- Marco Bacon as Colporteur
- Roger Blay as Clochard
- Normand Canac-Marquis as Proviseur
- Aubert Pallascio as Vieil instituteur
- Martin Desgagné as instituteur
