= Victor Andrés Trelles Turgeon =

Canadian actor

Victor Andrés Trelles Turgeon, sometimes credited as Victor Trelles, is a Canadian actor from Quebec. He is most noted for his performance in the 2012 film The Torrent (Le Torrent), for which he received a Prix Jutra nomination for Best Actor at the 15th Jutra Awards in 2013.

== Career ==
Turgeon has also appeared in the films The Wild Hunt, For the Love of God (Pour l'amour de Dieu), Mesnak, Henri Henri, Touched and Jouliks, and the television series La Marraine, Fatale-Station, Bellevue, The Forbidden Room, Victor Lessard, Deadly Class and Fortunate Son.

== Personal life ==
Turgeon is of partial Peruvian descent.

== Filmography ==
=== Film ===
Year	Title	Role	Notes
2009	The Wild Hunt	Miguel	
2010	The High Cost of Living	Student	
2011	For the Love of God (Pour l'amour de Dieu)	Père Malachy	
2011	Mesnak	Dave	
2012	The Torrent (Le Torrent)	François	
2014	Henri Henri	Henri	
2015	The Forbidden Room	Various roles	
2016	Arrival	Science Team Member	
2017	The Gracefield Incident	Joe Mendez	
2017	Touched	Vaddy	
2019	Coda	Photographer	
2021	Single All the Way	Jim	
2024	1+1+1 Life, Love, Chaos (1+1+1 ou La vie, l’amour, le chaos)	Jan	
2025	Elsewhere at Night (Ailleurs la nuit)	Nico	

=== Television ===
Year	Title	Role	Notes
2002	Ta voix dans la nuit	Alexandre	Television film
2009	The Phantom	Jordy Acevedo	2 episodes
2010	Mirador	Leandro	Episode: "La spirale du silence"
2011	Who Is Simon Miller?	Andres	Television film
2014	La marraine	Fernando Gomez	5 episodes
2015	Mon ex à moi	Alphonso	2 episodes
2016	Quantico	Hugo Ortiz	Episode: "Clear"
2016	Real Detective	Officer Broady	Episode: "No One Is Safe"
2016–2017	Fatale-Station	Dylan	8 episodes
2017	Bellevue	Dwayne	Episode: "Pilot"
2017	Victor Lessard	Diego	7 episodes
2018	Victor Lessard, un pas dans l'ombre	Diego Fernandez	5 episodes
2018	Marika	Paulo	3 episodes
2018–2020	Can You Hear Me?	Keven	15 episodes
2019	Deadly Class	Holy Ghost	4 episodes
2019	Blood & Treasure	Miguel	Episode: "Return of the Queen"
2020	Fortunate Son	Father Sandro Perez	8 episodes
2020	District 31	Samuel Théroux	2 episodes
2022	Transplant	Ephraim	Episode: "Jasmine"
2022	The Recruit	Talco	4 episodes
2022	Alice in Borderland	Sunato Banda / Additional voices (English version)	4 episodes
2023	Wong & Winchester	Sergeant Don	Episode: "The Retreat"
2024	Star Trek: Discovery	Duvin	Episodes: "Jinaal" and "Life, Itself"
