= Serge Kanyinda =

Congolese actor

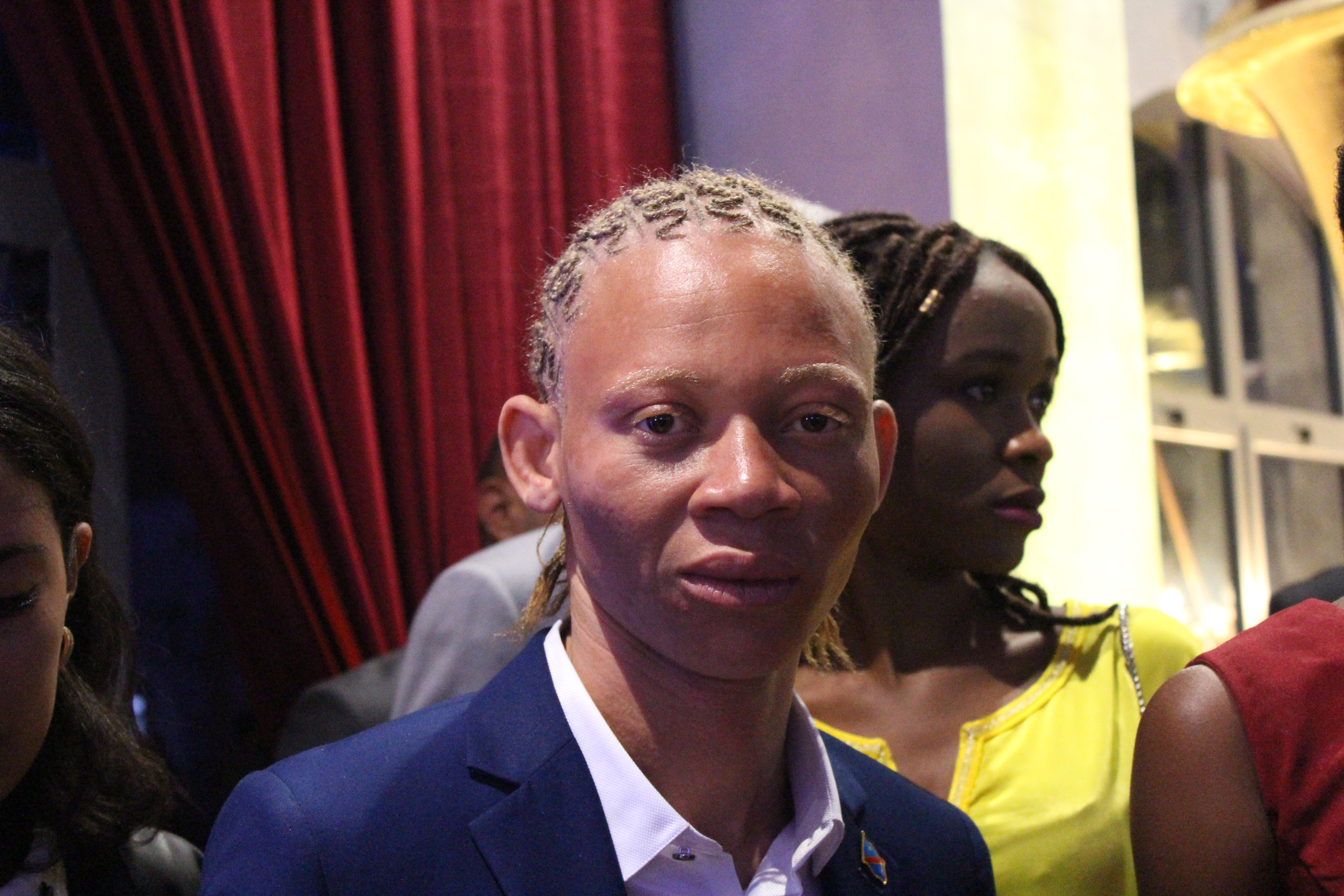
- Serge Kanyinda at the Carthage Film Festival 2018
- Occupation: actor
- Notable work: War Witch
- Awards: Canadian Screen Award

Serge Kanyinda is an actor from the Democratic Republic of the Congo, best known for his performance as Magicien in the 2012 film War Witch (Rebelle). He has albinism.

Kanyinda won the Canadian Screen Award for Best Supporting Actor at the 1st Canadian Screen Awards.
