= Ivan Grbovic =

Canadian cinematographer, film director and screenwriter

- Born: 1979 (age 45–46); Montreal, Canada
- Occupations: Cinematographer; Director; Screenwriter
- Years active: 2011-present
- Known for: Creating the film Drunken Birds
- Notable work: Romeo Eleven; Drunken Birds

Ivan Grbovic (born 1979 in Montreal, Quebec) is a Canadian cinematographer, film director and screenwriter, most noted for his film Drunken Birds (Les oiseaux ivres). The film was the top winner at the 24th Quebec Cinema Awards in 2022, including winning Best Film and garnering awards for Grbovic for Best Director and Best Screenplay, and was selected as the Canadian entry for the Best International Feature Film at the 94th Academy Awards.

He released his debut feature film Romeo Eleven (Roméo Onze) in 2011, for which he was a Jutra Award nominee for Best Director and Best Screenplay at the 15th Jutra Awards in 2013. He was also previously a Jutra nominee for Best Live Action Short Film at the 12th Jutra Awards in 2010 for La Chute, and a Prism Prize nominee in 2014 for his music video for Young Galaxy's "New Summer".

== Filmography ==
Year	Title	Director	Writer	Producer	Language	Ref
2010	La Chute	Yes	Yes	No	French	
2011	Romeo Eleven	Yes	Yes	No	French	
2021	Drunken Birds	Yes	Yes	No	French, Spanish	

== Awards ==
Year	Film	Award	Category	Remarks	Ref
2013	Romeo Eleven	Jutra Awards	Best Director	Nominated	
2013	Romeo Eleven	Jutra Awards	Best Screenplay	Nominated	
2021	Drunken Birds	FICFA	Best Canadian Film	Won	
2022	Drunken Birds	Prix Iris	Best Director	Won	
2022	Drunken Birds	Prix Iris	Best Screenplay	Won	
