= Pierre Even (producer) =

Canadian film producer from Quebec

- Born: Qeubec, Canada
- Occupation: Film producer
- Known for: War Witch, C.R.A.Z.Y., Café de Flore

Pierre Even is a Canadian film producer from Quebec. He is a two-time winner of the award for Best Motion Picture from the Academy of Canadian Cinema and Television, as producer of the films War Witch and C.R.A.Z.Y.; he was also nominated, but did not win, for Café de Flore.

His other production credits include The Colony, 5150 Elm's Way, Nitro, A Life Begins, Mars and April and Bon Cop, Bad Cop 2.

== Filmography ==
- 2005: C.R.A.Z.Y.
- 2007: Nitro
- 2008: Hank and Mike
- 2008: Le Banquet
- 2008: Modern Love
- 2008: The Woman of Ahhs
- 2009: Wild Hunt
- 2009: 5150 Elm's Way
- 2010: A Life Begins (Une vie qui commence)
- 2011: Café de Flore
- 2012: War Witch (Rebelle)
- 2012: Mars and April (Mars et Avril)
- 2013: Cyanide (Cyanure)
- 2013: The Colony
- 2014: Meetings with a Young Poet
- 2014: Miraculum
- 2014: The Masters of Suspense (Les Maîtres du suspense)
- 2015: Brooklyn
- 2016: Boundaries
- 2016: A Kid (Le fils de Jean)
- 2017: Eye on Juliet
- 2017: Bon Cop, Bad Cop 2
- 2017: We Are the Others (Nous sommes les autres)
- 2018: Birthmarked
- 2018: The Hummingbird Project
- 2021: Best Sellers
- 2021: Maria Chapdelaine
- 2023: Little Jesus (Petit Jésus)
- 2024: All Stirred Up! (Tous toqués!)
