= Dubois brothers =

French-Canadian crime gang

Dubois family
- Years active: 1950s - mid 1980s
- Territory: Montreal
- Ethnicity: French
- Membership: 9 members
- Activities: drug trafficking, pimping, extortion
- Allies: Popeyes Motorcycle Club,
- Rivals: Cotroni crime family, West End Gang, Devil's Disciples MC

The Dubois Brothers, also known as the Dubois gang, were a French-Canadian organized crime group consisting of nine brothers, which operated mostly in Montreal in the 1950s to the mid-1980s. The Dubois Brothers first gained their reputation for their criminal behaviour and their toughness throughout their teenage years. By the 1960s the Dubois Brothers were gaining control and were becoming the only crime group in Montreal that were considered to rival the Cotroni family in the 1960s and 1970s. The Dubois Brothers engaged in extortion, the exploitation of strippers and prostitutes, drug trafficking, loan sharking, and the murder of rival victims. A report by the Quebec Crime Commission called the gang "the most important criminal organization in Quebec," so vicious and strong that they were known to be feared by both outlaw motorcycle gangs and the nearby Mafia.

== Family background ==
The Dubois Brothers are nine of the ten sons of Napoléon Dubois also known as "Paulo" and Alice Thibodeau. The 10th son, Roger, never had any part of the organized crime group and worked for the government. The nine brothers consisted of: Raymond, Jean-Guy, Normand, Claude, Rene, Rolland, Jean-Paul, and the twins Maurice and Adrien. The Dubois Brothers came from Saint-Henri, a working-class neighbourhood in Montreal, which was bordered by rail yards and factories. Their father worked as a bartender at a local bar. The boys grew up in what they described as an "impoverished childhood" but were considered as being aggressive, strong and very close-knit, quickly realizing the strength in their unity. The Dubois Brothers had explained in an interview that in school they were mocked because of what they wore and many times had to skip meals or could only have molasses sandwiches. Their father, Napoléon 'Paulo' Dubois, died near the end of the Dubois Brothers reign in January 1976 of what was considered a natural death in an old folks home.

== Brothers ==
Adrien Dubois

Adrien Dubois was the second youngest of the ten brothers. Adrien was generally considered the strong man in the drug trade along with his brother Claude. He was perceived as the smarter and more discreet operator, while some of his brothers were the flexing type. After Adrien was charged and acquitted in a highly publicized case in 1983 he stayed clear of the spotlight and criminal charges. In the final years of his life he lived in a cottage north of Montreal in Saint Adele and presided over a company, which was registered as a real-estate firm. His family stated in his obituary that he died at the age of 68 and no cause of death was given, although there was a request that any donations go to the Canadian Cancer Society.

Claude Dubois

Claude was known as the singing killer. Keep in mind that there was another Claude Dubois at the time whose career was purely musical. Claude was a nightclub singer in his spare time. When he was young he started out by working as a door-man for the Mafia, which gave him a foot in the door of the criminal underworld. As the Cotroni family began to weaken it allowed him to expand his work into strip clubs and bars. He ran his empire very efficiently and would ensure regular meetings to make sure he was on top of everything. Claude was very active in the downtown drug trafficking trade along with his brother Adrien. At the end of Claude's career he was sentenced to 25 years for the murder of Cotroni's brother-in-law in 1973.

Jean-Guy Dubois

He was convicted of murder after he dumped a bartender's body into the Lachine Canal in 1975. Jean-Guy had a son named Alain Dubois, who grew up as Jean-Guy served time in prison for second degree murder and later continued the cycle of criminality because he claimed it was the only place he felt like he fit in.

Raymond Dubois

Raymond was the eldest of the brothers and was considered the deadliest of the gang, having a criminal record stretching back to 1947. Raymond specialized in extortion and was a suspect in hundreds of crimes throughout Montreal, but despite his crimes and tactics he was rarely convicted. In November 1976, Raymond had been driving in his limousine when he was violating traffic laws by going through twelve red lights in a row, when he was pulled over by a police officer and was arrested, he grabbed the officers finger and twisted it until it broke. Raymond faced murder charges in 1974 but was acquitted. Raymond committed suicide in 1989 at the age of 57. He was found in a hotel room surrounded by pills with his wrists slit.

Normand and Rolland Dubois

Both these Rolland and Normand were charged with assault in 1977 and spent some time in prison.

Jean-Paul Dubois

In 1977, Jean-Paul received a year's sentence for possessing the proceeds of a $100,000 jewelry theft and was also charged with perjury and contempt by the commission.

René and Maurice Dubois

There was no information found on them.

== Life of crime ==
It is believed that the strength of the Dubois Brothers was built from the trust that they had between them, they were said to have made a gang of perfect cohesion in their neighbourhood who few would compete against. They built their criminal organization and power on intimidation and violence; they reigned like crime lords over illegitimate and legitimate businesses in their controlled territories. The Quebec Police Commission complimented the Brothers in a statement they gave in 1977 in their report: "Some maintain that the ruthless methods of the Dubois, the large number of toughs gravitating about each of the nine brothers, as well as the widely dreaded cruelty of their hirelings, make them the most influential criminal group at the present time on the island of Montreal." The network that the Dubois Brothers organized was made up of about two hundred men loosely organized into independent gangs of several dozen members with the brothers at the centre of this organization. Even the Dubois Brothers' number one hitman, Donald Lavoie, was scared of the brothers because he claimed that they were too powerful and he believed that one day Claude Dubois would put a bullet through his head. The Dubois Brothers were not considered ones to hold back, and they acted to a degree they thought was necessary regardless of the cost, which reaffirmed the cruelty they demonstrated to their victims and foes that in turn shaped their reputation. Instances such as when a restaurant owner stood up to the Brothers insisting that they needed to pay for their food, which resulted in him being assaulted and a knife taken to his chest in order to carve a cross in it. Events such as this one left people fearful of the Dubois Brothers and reinforced their supremacy.

Mercier, a Montreal journalist, started to realize how much corruption and integration into the community the group had once he began to follow one of the assault cases through the courts. The case was involving one of the young Dubois brothers and a merchant from St. Henri who had been beaten after he had refused to pay his daily receipt to the brothers’ hold up men. Mercier believed that the Dubois Brothers were getting help from someone on the inside as the victim was almost sentenced and the Dubois brother had only received a small fine. The Dubois Brothers also received permits, swung votes to which person they wanted through intimidation and were able to get judges to give reduced sentences. They had corrupted a journalist in order to have the journalist change information they needed and report information they wanted out. However, with his change of careers due to the company finding out about his corruption, the Dubois Brothers turned him into their lawyer, opening an office and giving them legal information. They were able to corrupt politicians, the police, judges and lawyers according to Mercier.

There was never any formal structure or hierarchy to the Dubois Brothers group, other than the Brothers were on the top, they either individually or in tandem with each other controlled a particular criminal activity or territory and often shared their army or other members. The Dubois Brothers began in the 1950s with petty street crimes and eventually moved on to the four oldest brothers - Raymond, Jean-Guy, Normand and Claude - starting to convince local bar owners to give them protection funds and other extortions. Some of their earliest street crimes were a series of burglaries and armed robberies. By the 1960s, the Dubois Brothers began targeting the owners and employees of nightclubs, bars and taverns in the eastern side of the city. Near the end of the 1960s, five of the brothers were charged with murdering a waiter at a quarrel in a local bar, which ended with the waiter shot. They were later acquitted and continued their reign. Between the late 1960s and the early 1970s, the Dubois Brothers expanded their territory into the downtown region as they challenged the supremacy of the Cotroni Mafia family. The Cotroni Family began to show signs of weakness around the 1970s, allowing the expansion of the Dubois Brothers territory into both the east and west sides of Montreal. This allowed the Brothers to wipe out the rival Irish gang and to take over the lucrative drug market by out muscling a motorcycle gang. The Dubois Brothers were prospering in the 1970s and continued to expand their territory and add to their criminal lifestyle. One of the Commissioners in the 1977 report described the Dubois brothers as living, in "opulence if we can judge by the external manifestations of wealth, such as town houses, country houses, expensive cars and an ostentatious life style."

=== Protection tax and loan sharking ===
The Dubois Brothers were known to terrorize the owners of nightclubs and bars in order to force the owners into paying protection taxes and then would begin to take over their business. They were known to use these tactics similarly with drug dealers, prostitutes, pimps, loan sharks, strippers, thieves and fences. The Brothers would start by frequenting a bar or nightclub either themselves or through sending an associate or cronies, they would begin by seeming friendly and then move on to picking fights with patrons, vandalizing the premises, commence harassing staff and assaulting the owner in a hostile take over. It would continue to get progressively worse until the owner could not take anymore of the attacks and agreed to what they Dubois Brothers were wanting. There seemed to be no option for the owners once the Brothers became interested, and they would do what it took in order to get what they wanted. The Dubois Brothers would often settle for $100 a week in protection tax or payments, which at the time would have been equivalent to around $1000 a week today, with the Brothers collecting individually from dozens of bars or clubs. One witness, Charles Houle, who owned a bar on Notre Dame street west in Montreal claimed to police that the Dubois Brothers, specifically Raymond, in 1965 had paid a quick visit to his bar shortly they had opened and demanded he pay the weekly fee for the protection tax. It turned out that even at his testimony many years later he was still paying the tax and at this time it was believed to have totalled $50,000. Once there was control over the bar they would force integration of other criminal activities such as: control hiring so they could hire criminals, loansharking, drugs, gambling, etc. The owners would have no say in the matter and the criminal activities and the Dubois Brothers would gain a business or home base for their transactions and other criminal business.

If the Brothers received a refusal or negative response from an owner of a business they wished to take over, the Brothers or their associates would ensure nightly visits to the business where they would threaten patrons and staff and continue the hostility and if worse came to worse threaten the owners life. There were many cases of the attacks on business owners, one of them was Louis Fournier, owner of Jean Lou Cabaret, who refused the transaction with the Brothers and later was murdered on June 20, 1971. Another similar case was that of Laurier Gatien, owner the Tavern Montreal, who had to endure multiple attempts on his life including shootings, knifing, and attacks with billiard cues and balls. Gatien could not deal with the pressure and later had to sell the tavern in October 1973. One of the Brothers, Claude Dubois, had decided to expand the protection taxes even further by including pimps, prostitutes and strippers by requiring them to buy a work permit if they wished to work the streets or work in the club within the Dubois territory.

By the 1970s, the Dubois Brothers, in the west end, had become the most prevalent loan sharks using the bars they had taken as their offices in order to run their loan sharking business. In order for a borrower to obtain a loan they had to pay a visit to one of the Dubois Brothers offices or businesses where if the loan were approved they would either receive the money directly or delivered later to them. It was expected of the borrower to make their payments in cash to the same location that they borrowed from and the interest of the loan was substantial usually sitting around 30%. One of their associates who turned informant, Dugenais, told police that the majority of the Dubois Brothers loan shark customers were taxi drivers who would take the money to go to nightclubs and racetracks. One of the clients had claimed that because he could not afford to pay his $50 debt, which he ran up playing billiards, to Adrien Dubois, he had no choice but to agree to be forced into the drug trade as a drug pusher claiming that they were greedy and took more profit than they should have.

=== Drug trafficking ===
As the Dubois Brothers continued to make money and become wealthier, they realized that the highest profits were in the drug trade. Realizing that drugs, especially methamphetamine, were cheap enough to get and highly addictive and once a customer was hooked they could not resist coming back for more, creating a customer base. One of their previous drug pushers stated that the Dubois Brothers could get a pound of marijuana for $30 imported from Mexico and were able to sell it on the streets for up to $750, making a major profit. The Dubois Brothers, specifically Adrien, Claude and Rolland, had branched off into drug trafficking in the mid 1970s and were controlling, in the west end and city center of Montreal, the sales of marijuana, hashish, LSD, amphetamines, and cocaine. They had a web of dealers set up to distribute the drugs, all of which were working in licensed establishments under the control of at least one of the Brothers. Montreal police were able to seize a drug distribution for the Dubois Brothers that consisted of nearly two million tenure pills in late 1973 to early 1974. The Brothers took it one step further by going continental when they began having roots in Pakistan because Adrien Dubois decided to introduce a Sixth Family associate to his impressive source of hashish through a corrupt government official in Pakistan, who had a ministerial position and thrived for foreign currency. The Dubois Brothers were always thirsty for more territory and money, which lead to the McSween Turf War.

==== McSween turf war ====
The Dubois Brothers had the McSweens, an Irish-Canadian gang, join their associates in 1957 after one of the Brothers met Pierre McSween in reform school while serving a two-year term for theft. McSween reported in his testimony that he and his brothers specialized in truck hijackings, selling the booty to the Dubois gang for a fraction of the value and committing theft or robbery, and the Dubois Brothers in turn provided them with supplies such as weapons, getaway cars and other hired hands.

The war between the two groups, Dubois Brothers and the McSween gang, broke out in 1973. The McSweens owned the territory adjacent to the Dubois Brothers for many years and the Dubois Brothers intended to drive the McSweens from their territory and start what was considered "the war over the west end." What instigated the war was when Réal Lapine, one of the friends and drug trafficking associates of the McSweens, was murdered in a bar on Notre Dame street after he refused to sell Adrien Dubois drugs. The Dubois ended up being victorious in the battle and were able to expand their territory, but at the expense of over a dozen lives from both sides. Amongst the deceased was Jacques McSween, who was ambushed in his home by Jean-Guy, and Adrien and Claude Dubeau and were killed on October 5, 1974. The most notorious of all the killings though was known as the Valentine's Eve Massacre.

==== Valentine’s Eve Massacre ====
The Valentine's Eve Massacre happened on the south side of Montreal, in Hôtel Lapinière on February 13, 1975, which was a hangout of the McSween gang. It happened when three men walked into the packed bar during a country-music show and opened fire, killing four men and injuring five others. Three of the people killed had no association with either gangs and according to Pierre McSween, he did not consider them "cool" killers because they just walked in and sprayed the place instead of walking up to the person they wished to execute and shooting them in the back of the head so no one else would get hurt. The target that evening was Roger "Birdie" Létourneau, who was a former member of the gang before the Dubois Brothers took over. The men behind the shooting, according to McSween, were Roger Fontaine, Claude Dubois, and Claude Lebeau who were carrying M-1 Semi-automatic rifles. After the Dubois Brothers had taken over the McSween territory they focused on taking over the downtown area.

==== Devils Disciples conflict ====
The downtown area, which was Claude Dubois’ target, was very profitable in the trafficking of marijuana, LSD, and particularly meth, which operated out of the hippie area of St. Henri Square. Dubois was wanting to gain control of Saint-Louis Square, which was run by the Devil's Disciples Motorcycle Club. The Devil's Disciples were purely French and were considered the most powerful biker gang in Montreal at the time. The Disciples had created a highly profitable drug trafficking business in the Saint-Louis Square, which was located in downtown Montreal in 1972, and almost instantly became the largest open-air drug market in Montreal. Claude Dubois considered this as a threat and intrusion into his and his Brothers territory and hired another muscle group of bikers called the Popeyes Motorcycle Club led by Yves Buteau. Between 1974 and 1976, fifteen members of the Disciples were killed and the Dubois Brothers succeeded, taking over the territory and running the Disciples out of the city, yet again displaying their power. The Popeyes then began selling and managing the drugs in Saint-Henri square and the surrounding area after they chased out the Disciples, but this was short lived as the Montreal Police had assembled a well- organized task force to take down the Dubois Brothers.

== The fall of the Dubois Brothers ==
On November 17, 1975, the police began to set forth action by organizing a task force in order to bring down the powerful Dubois Brothers. After some time, pressure started to mount on Dubois Brothers organization through undercover operations. Some of the organizations most notorious and loyal associates began to turn on them, either becoming informants or had met violent deaths. The police and media stated that never before has the code of silence of the criminal underworld been broken by so many criminals, especially those who were so loyal to the organization's core. Among these numerous informants was Donald Lavoie, one of the Dubois Brothers most trusted hitman, whose previous occupation had been to eliminate anyone suspected of snitching as well as anyone who they told him to eliminate. It was Donald Lavoie who played the biggest part in the fall of the Dubois Brothers power, when Claude Dubois had put a bounty on Lavoie, forcing Lavoie to testify for protection.

By 1977, Rolland and Normand were charged with assault and Claude and Adrien were charged with perjury for giving a false testimony to the Police Commission. Earlier that year, Jean-Paul was charged with perjury and contempt by the commission and received a one year prison sentence for possessing the proceeds of a $100,000 jewelry theft, leaving five of the brothers behind bars. On April 27, 1977, Jean-Guy was found guilty of the 2nd degree murder of Jean-Guy Fournier. It was not until November 12, 1982, that Claude Dubois, who was considered one of the driving forces of the family's crime empire, was convicted of the 1973 murder of Cotroni's brother-in-law and was locked away for 25 years, resulting in the fall of the Dubois Brothers. By the mid-1980s, the Brothers had lost their empire and were split up with some behind bars and some laying low. The name would have been all but forgotten in Montreal if it were not for Adrien Dubois, who had become a successful businessman, after he was acquitted from his crime, owning buildings and nightclubs in Laurentian.

== In popular culture ==
The 2023 film Dusk for a Hitman (Crépuscule pour un tueur) centres on the Dubois Gang, starring Éric Bruneau as Donald Lavoie and Benoît Gouin as Claude Dubois.
