= Christine Beaulieu =

Canadian actress and playwright

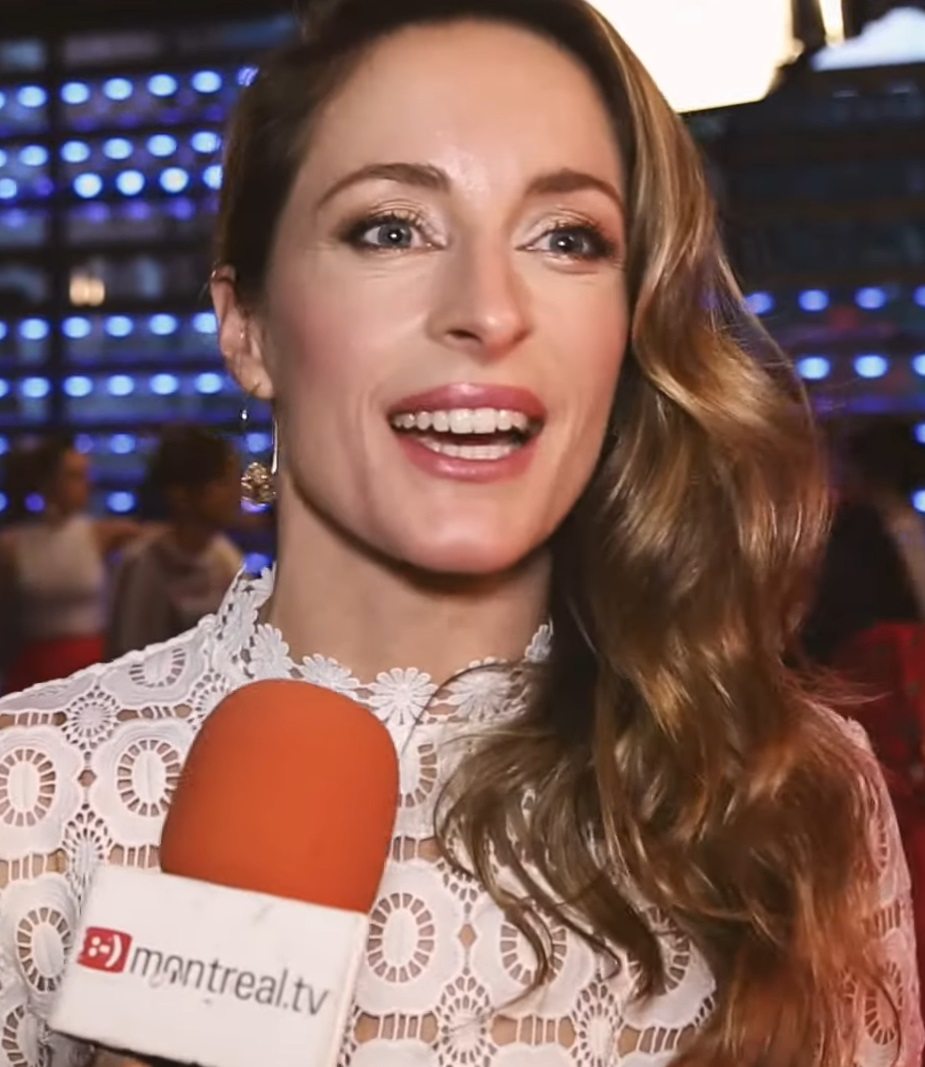
- Beaulieu in 2016
- Born: October 14, 1981 (age 45); Pointe-du-Lac, Quebec, Canada
- Occupations: Actress, playwright
- Years active: 2005–present

Christine Beaulieu (born October 14, 1981) is a Canadian actress and playwright.

== Career ==
She received a Canadian Screen Award nomination as Best Supporting Actress at the 4th Canadian Screen Awards, and a Prix Iris nomination for Best Supporting Actress at the 18th Quebec Cinema Awards, for her performance in The Mirage (Le Mirage), and was again a Prix Iris nominee for Best Supporting Actress at the 24th Quebec Cinema Awards in 2022 for Norbourg.

She won the Gémeaux Award for Best Supporting Actress in a Comedy Series in 2020 for her regular role as Josiane in Lâcher prise. She was previously a nominee in the same category in 2019.

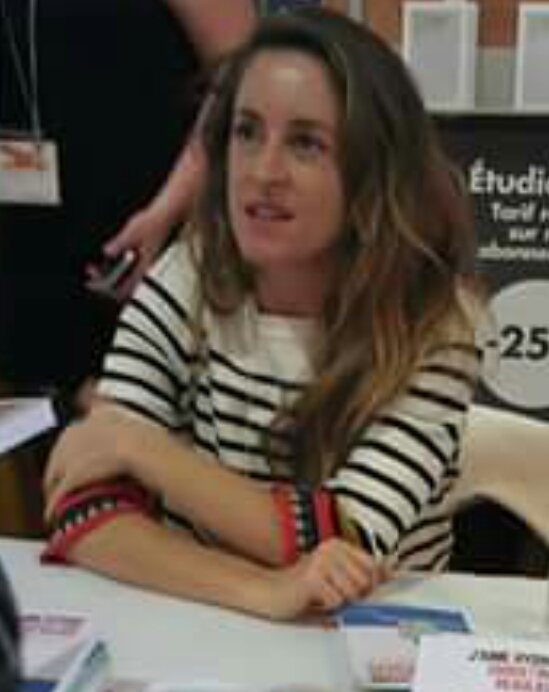
Beaulieu at the Salon du livre de Montréal 2017

As a playwright, she was shortlisted for the Governor General's Award for French-language drama at the 2018 Governor General's Awards for J'aime Hydro. In 2024, she won the TD Canadian Children's Literature Award in the French category for Les saumons de la Mitis, a children's book adaptation of her own theatrical play of the same title.

In 2025 she was announced as having a supporting role in the upcoming television series adaptation of Bon Cop, Bad Cop.

== Filmography ==
=== Film ===
Year	Title	Role	Notes
2005	Life with My Father (La vie avec mon père)	Guest #1	
2007	My Daughter, My Angel (Ma fille, mon ange)	Secretary	
2008	Je fonds en comble	Isabelle	
2008	Something in the Way	Other Girl	
2008	Mesrine	Lizon	
2009	Romaine par moins 30	Justin's girlfriend	
2009	2e touché		
2010	Love Requiem	Katherine	
2010	Suspicions (Jaloux)	Nancy	
2010	L'Insecte	Jenny	
2010	Les bons termes selon Dewey		
2011	Fall, Finally (Enfin l'automne)	Maude	
2012	Camion	Marion	
2012	Small Blind (La Mise à l'aveugle)	Julie	
2012	Parachute	Woman	
2012	Justin & Julie	Julie	
2013	La soutenable lourdeur de l'être	Julie	
2014	Stranger in a Cab (Ceci n'est pas un polar)	Marianne	
2015	The Mirage (Le Mirage)	Roxane	
2016	Kiss Me Like a Lover (Embrasse-moi comme tu m'aimes)	Mother	
2017	My Last Summer (Mon dernier été)	Édith's mother	
2018	Fontaineblues		
2019	Forgotten Flowers (Les fleurs oubliées)	Mathilde Gauvreau	
2019	Aimé	Marie-Pier	
2020	Laughter (Le Rire)	Sylvie	
2020	Un jour de fête	Mother	
2021	Nouveau Québec	Sophie	
2022	Norbourg	Anne-Marie Boisvert	
2022	Very Nice Day (Très belle journée)		
2022	The Cheaters (Les Tricheurs)	Florence	
2022	Two Days Before Christmas (23 décembre)	Gabrielle	
2023	Frontiers (Frontières)	Carmen Messier	
2023	The Nature of Love (Simple comme Sylvain)		
2024	The Thawing of Ice (La fonte des glaces)	Louise Denoncourt	
2024	A Christmas Storm (Le Cyclone de Noël)	Isabelle Gagnon	
2026	The Parking Spot (La Place)		

=== Television ===
Year	Title	Role	Notes
2005	Félix Leclerc	Parti Québécois campaigner	
2005	Les Invincibles	Julie	Two episodes
2006	Vice caché	Julie	One episode
2010	C.A.	Marie-Pierre	Six episodes
2012-13	Unité 9	IPL transport #1	Two episodes
2014	Ces gars-là	Gerry's mother	One episode
2014-17	Les pêcheurs	Carole Potvin	Three episodes
2015	Mon ex à moi	Maeva	Eight episodes
2015	La théorie du K.O.	Danielle	One episode
2017	Délateurs	Karla Homolka	One episode
2017	Victor Lessard	Josée	One episode
2017	District 31	Geneviève Allaire	17 episodes
2017-20	Lâcher prise	Josiane	13 episodes
2018	Max et Livia	Christine	One episode
2018	Hubert et Fanny	Frédérique Desjardins	11 episodes
2018	Les Simone	Jeanne	Seven episodes
2019-22	Cerebrum	Simone Vallier	18 episodes
2023	L'Œil du cyclone	Isabelle Gagnon	Five episodes
2026	Bon Cop, Bad Cop	Kim Dupuis	
