= Nathalie Doummar =

Canadian actress and playwright

Nathalie Doummar (born in Montreal, Quebec, Canada) is a Canadian actress and playwright. She is most noted for her performance in the 2016 film Boundaries (Pays), for which she received a Canadian Screen Award nomination for Best Actress at the 5th Canadian Screen Awards.

== Early life ==
Doummar was born in Montreal and is second-generation Canadian. Her parents are of Egyptian descent and fled Egypt during Nasser's regime. They settled in Montreal. She has a brother named Daniel. She was raised in Saint Laurent, a large, multicultural borough in Montreal. Lebanese, Egyptian, and Syrian cultures influenced her childhood. Doummar attended private school in Montreal and later university, where she graduated with a degree in primary education. She worked in primary education for two years and was certified as a teacher. However, due to an interest in theatre, she quit teaching and decided to study drama instead. She was admitted to the Conservatoire d'art dramatique de Montréal in her early 20s. During her time at the Conservatory, she was rarely considered for roles traditionally intended to be played by white actors.

== Career ==
She has also appeared in the films Dans l'ombre des Shafia, No Trace (Nulle trace) and The Furies (Les Furies), the television series Au secours de Béatrice, Boomerang and Good Morning Chuck (Bon matin Chuck, ou l'art de réduire les méfaits), and the web series Teodore pas de H. Doummar is a main cast member of TV series Aller Simple (2022).

She is a graduate of the Conservatoire d'art dramatique de Montréal. Her first theatrical play, Coco, premiered in 2016. In 2019, her play Delphine de Ville St-Laurent was adapted by Chloé Robichaud as the short film Delphine.

== Personal life ==
In her early 20s, she married her husband, who is a childhood friend. They share two young daughters. She separated from her husband and had a romantic relationship with a woman. Doummar and her husband divorced when she was in her early 30s. Her divorce and romantic relationship after her divorce inspired her play, Mama, which premiered at the Théâtre Jean-Duceppe in Montreal during the autumn of 2022. Mama ran from September to October 2022 at the Théâtre Jean-Duceppe.

Doummar's father, who worked for Hydro Québéc, died in 2020. She wrote a play in his memory called Frère, which premiered in Canada in April 2025. She described herself in an interview with the Canadian press as a feminist and an extrovert. She is fluent in French and English, speaks some Spanish, and knows basic Arabic.
