= No Trace =

No Trace may refer to:

- No Trace (1950 film), a British crime film directed by John Gilling
- No Trace (2021 film), a Canadian drama film directed by Simon Lavoie
- No Trace Camping, a Canadian film and television studio
