= Mont Foster (film) =

2019 Canadian thriller film

- Film poster
- Directed by: Louis Godbout
- Written by: Louis Godbout
- Produced by: Sébastien Poussard
- Starring: Patrick Hivon; Laurence Leboeuf
- Cinematography: Jean-François Lord
- Edited by: Claude Palardy
- Music by: Ramachandra Borcar
- Production company: Les Films Primatrice
- Distributed by: K Films Amérique
- Release date: October 2019 (Mostra)
- Running time: 97 minutes
- Country: Canada
- Language: French

Mont Foster is a Canadian drama film, directed by Louis Godbout and released in 2019. Freely adapted from the poem Erlkönig by Goethe, the film stars Patrick Hivon and Laurence Leboeuf as Mathieu and Chloé, a couple spending time at an isolated cabin in the country, where Chloé slips into insanity after seeing and hearing strange visions.

The cast also includes Lucie Laurier, Émile Proulx-Cloutier and Laurent Lucas.

The film premiered in October 2019 at the São Paulo International Film Festival, before having its Canadian premiere in March 2020 at the Rendez-vous Québec Cinéma.

The film received a Prix Iris nomination at the 22nd Quebec Cinema Awards in 2021 for Best Actor (Hivon).
