= Sophie Desmarais =

Canadian actress

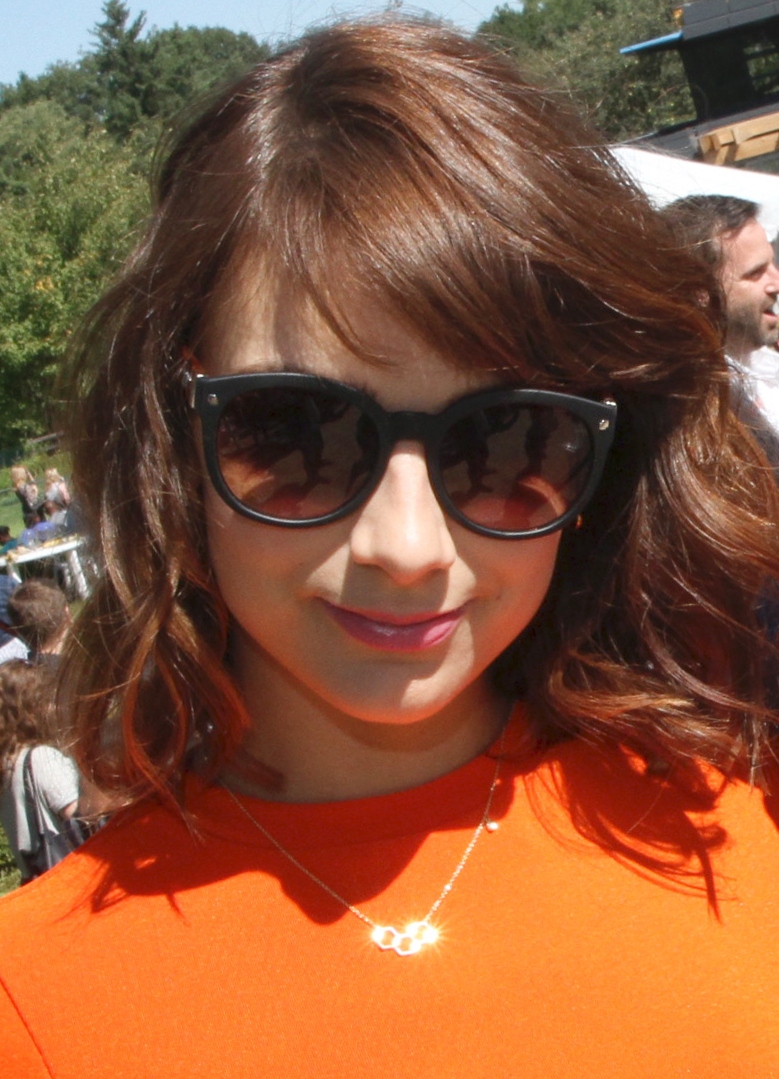
- Born: July 24, 1986 (age 40); Montreal, Quebec
- Occupation: Actor

Sophie Desmarais (born July 24, 1986 in Montreal, Quebec) is a Canadian actress, best known for her role in the 2013 film Sarah Prefers to Run (Sarah préfère la course), written and directed by Chloé Robichaud.

== Career ==
Desmarais began her career with a small roles in John Duigan's Head in the Clouds in 2004.

In 2010 she had a small role in Heartbeats, directed by Xavier Dolan, followed by Benoît Pilon's Trash (Décharge) in 2011.

In 2013 she played the lead role in Sarah Prefers to Run which went on to play in the Un Certain Regard section at the 2013 Cannes Film Festival. The following year, she appeared in Julie Hivon's film What Are We Doing Here? (Qu'est-ce qu'on fait ici ?).

== Awards ==
For Sarah Prefers to Run, she won the Vancouver Film Critics Circle award for Best Actress in a Canadian Film at the Vancouver Film Critics Circle Awards 2013.

She was named a Rising Star at the 2014 Toronto International Film Festival.

She has been a two-time Jutra Award and Prix Iris nominee for Best Supporting Actress, receiving nods at the 16th Jutra Awards in 2014 for The Dismantling (Le Démantèlement) and at the 23rd Quebec Cinema Awards in 2021 for Vacarme.

== Filmography ==
=== Film ===
Year	Title	Role	Notes
2004	Head in the Clouds	Élodie	
2008	Barbe et charisme	Joannie	
2008	Honey, I'm in Love (Le Grand départ)	Myriam	
2008	Sans titre (La jeune fille au matelas)	Captive	
2008	Victoria	Suzanna	
2009	Heat Wave (Les Grandes chaleurs)	Naomie	
2009	Polytechnique	Female student, 3rd floor corridor	
2010	Curling	Isabelle	
2010	L'Épitaphe	Patricia	
2010	Exit 67 (Sortie 67)	Lola	
2010	Heartbeats (Les Amours imaginaires)	Rockabill	
2010	Nature morte	Maryline	
2010	Vodka canneberge	Marilyn	
2011	Funkytown	Kiki	
2011	Trash (Décharge)	Eve	
2012	For Shakespeare with Love (Pour le meilleur et pour Shakespeare)	Juliette	
2012	Wintergreen (Paparmane)	Camille	
2013	The Dismantling (Le Démantèlement)	Frédérique Gagnon	
2013	Hunting the Northern Godard (La Chasse au Godard d'Abbittibbi)	Marie	
2013	Je ne suis pas un grand acteur	Florence	
2013	Sarah Prefers to Run (Sarah préfère la course)	Sarah	
2013	La tête en bas		
2014	Gurov and Anna	Mercedes	
2014	Henri Henri	Hélène Guérin	
2014	Un parallèle plus tard	Eve	
2014	La trilogie du canard (Élise, Gédéon, Sofia)	Mia	
2014	What Are We Doing Here? (Qu’est-ce qu’on fait ici ?)	Lily	
2015	The Forbidden Room	Jane Lanyon	
2018	My Boy (Mon Boy)	Marilyn	
2018	To Live Here (Pour vivre ici)	Sylvie	
2018	La Version nouvelle		
2019	Be Yourself	Noémie	
2020	Don't Read This on a Plane	Jovana Fey	
2020	Pink Lake	Sophie	
2020	Vacarme	Karine	
2022	Nut Jobs (Les pas d'allure)	Angie	
2022	The Switch (La Switch)	Julie	
2023	Days of Happiness (Les Jours heureux)	Emma	
2024	Who by Fire	Émilie	Premiere at 74th Berlin International Film Festival
2026	Redemptions (Rédemptions)		

=== Television ===
Year	Title	Role	Notes
2008	Stan et ses stars	Véro-Nat	
2009	Un tueur si proche	Friend of Jeremy	One episode
2009	La galère	Chanel	Five episodes
2010	Dakodak	Laura Valiquette	Six episodes
2011-15	Yamaska	Suzie Castonguay	18 episodes
2015-16	Mon ex à moi	Amélie Boutet	32 episodes
2016	Prémonitions	Liliane Jacob	10 episodes
2016-17	L'Imposteur	Gaïa Maheux	18 episodes
2018-19	District 31	Charlène Baribeau	28 episodes
2018-20	Can You Hear Me (M'entends-tu?)	Amélie	10 episodes
2018-20	En tout cas	Sophie	27 episodes
2020	Happily Married (C'est comme ça que je t'aime)	Marie-Josée Bolduc	20 episodes
2022	Pour toi Flora	Sister Émilie	Five episodes
