= Benoît Gouin =

Canadian actor

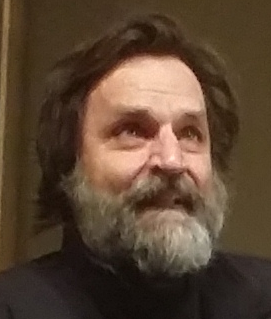
- Born: January 27, 1961 (age 65); Pointe-du-Lac, Quebec
- Occupation: actor
- Notable work: Québec-Montréal, Gabrielle

Benoît Gouin (born January 27, 1961) is a Canadian actor from Pointe-du-Lac, Quebec. He is most noted as a two-time Jutra Award nominee for Best Supporting Actor, receiving nods at the 5th Jutra Awards in 2003 for his performance as Michel Gauvin in Québec-Montréal and at the 16th Jutra Awards in 2014 for his performance as Laurent in Gabrielle.

He has also appeared in the films Love and Magnets (Les Aimants), The Broken Line (La ligne brisée), I Killed My Mother (J'ai tué ma mère), The Last Escape (La dernière fugue), Suspicions (Jaloux), Silence Lies (Tromper le silence), Sarah Prefers to Run (Sarah préfère la course), Origami, Infiltration (Le problème d'infiltration), Antigone, The Cheaters (Les Tricheurs), Dusk for a Hitman (Crépuscule pour un tueur), My Mother's Men (Les Hommes de ma mère), The Parking Spot (La Place) and L'Autre, and the television series Les grands procès, Scoop, L'ombre de l'épervier, Catherine, Le Monde de Charlotte, Fortier, Au nom de la loi, Les Hauts et les bas de Sophie Paquin, Karl & Max, Prémonitions and La Faille.

He is married to literary translator Maryse Warda.
