= Origami (film) =

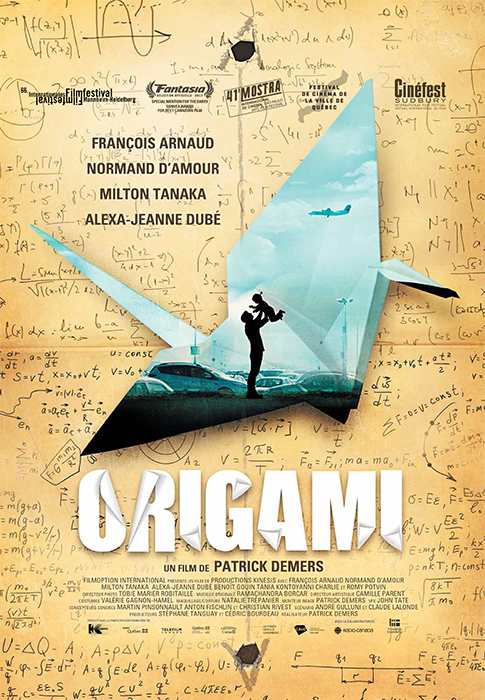
- Directed by: Patrick Demers
- Written by: André Gulluni; Claude Lalonde
- Produced by: Cédric Bourdeau; Stéphane Tanguay
- Starring: François Arnaud
- Cinematography: Tobie Marier Robitaille
- Edited by: Patrick Demers
- Music by: Ramachandra Borcar
- Production company: Productions Kinesis
- Distributed by: Filmoption
- Release date: July 18, 2017 (Fantasia)
- Running time: 95 minutes
- Country: Canada
- Languages: French; Japanese

Origami is a Canadian science fiction thriller film, directed by Patrick Demers and released in 2017. The film stars François Arnaud as David, a man struggling to make sense of whether his apparent ability to travel back and forth in time is the result of a psychotic break or a timeline that is genuinely folding in on itself.

The film's cast also includes Nobuya Shimamoto, Max Laferriere, Stefanie Nakamura, Benoît Gouin, Alexa-Jeanne Dubé, Normand D'Amour, Patrick Forest, Tania Kontoyanni and Milton Tanaka.

The film premiered on July 18, 2017 at the Fantasia Film Festival, before going into commercial release in 2018.

== Critical response ==
Norman Wilner of Now rated the film three N's, writing that "the charismatic Arnaud (Blindspot, The People Garden) does a fine job of holding the whole thing together, even as when it briefly flirts with turning into a bad remake of The Butterfly Effect." André Duchesne of La Presse also praised Arnaud's performance as successfully carrying a difficult film.

== Awards ==
At the Fantasia Film Festival, the film received a special citation from the Barry Convex Award jury.

Screenwriters André Gulluni and Claude Lalonde received a Prix Iris nomination for Best Screenplay at the 21st Quebec Cinema Awards in 2019.
