= Trash (2011 film) =

2011 film by Benoît Pilon

- French: Décharge
- Directed by: Benoît Pilon
- Written by: Benoît Pilon; Pierre Szalowski
- Produced by: Richard Lalonde
- Starring: David Boutin; Isabel Richer; Sophie Desmarais
- Cinematography: Michel La Veaux
- Edited by: Richard Comeau; Louis-Philippe Rathé
- Music by: Robert M. Lepage
- Production company: Forum Films
- Distributed by: Remstar
- Release date: October 2, 2011
- Running time: 94 minutes
- Country: Canada
- Language: French

Trash (French: Décharge) is a Canadian drama film, directed by Benoît Pilon and released in 2011. The film stars David Boutin as Pierre Dalpé, a formerly homeless man who has rebuilt his life with a successful trash collection business and a marriage to Madeleine (Isabel Richer), the woman who saved him from the streets; however, his fortunes begin to take a turn for the worse again after he meets Ève (Sophie Desmarais), a young drug addict living on the streets whom he tries to help in the same way.

The film began production in December 2009 in Montreal. It premiered on October 2, 2011, at the Festival International du Film Francophone de Namur, before premiering commercially in Quebec on October 21.

Kathryn Casault received a Jutra Award nomination for Best Makeup at the 14th Jutra Awards in 2012.
