= Boundaries (2016 film) =

Film directed by Chloé Robichaud

- Film poster
- French: Pays
- Directed by: Chloé Robichaud
- Written by: Chloé Robichaud
- Produced by: Fanny-Laure Malo; Barbara Doran; Pierre Even; Marie-Claude Poulin
- Starring: Emily VanCamp; Macha Grenon; Serge Houde; Rémy Girard
- Cinematography: Jessica Lee Gagné
- Edited by: Michel Arcand
- Music by: Simon Bertrand
- Production companies: Item 7 La Boîte à Fanny; Morag Loves Company
- Distributed by: Les Films Seville
- Release date: September 10, 2016 (TIFF)
- Running time: 100 minutes
- Country: Canada
- Language: French

Boundaries (French: Pays) is a Canadian drama film, directed by Chloé Robichaud and premiering at the 2016 Toronto International Film Festival.

The film's central characters are Emily Price (Emily VanCamp), Danielle Richard (Macha Grenon) and Félixe Nasser-Villeray (Nathalie Doummar). Félixe is a newly elected Canadian Member of Parliament who is part of a delegation to the small island nation of Besco to negotiate Canadian investment in the struggling nation's mining industry. Danielle is the country's president and Emily is a mediator involved in the investment talks.

The cast also includes Serge Houde, Rémy Girard, Micheline Lanctôt, Jean-Guy Bouchard and Alexandre Landry.

The film was shot primarily in St. John's and Fogo Island, Newfoundland and Labrador.

== Plot ==
Félixe Nasser-Villeray (Nathalie Doummar) is a young, newly elected Member of Parliament. She has been assigned to be part of a delegation from Canada sent to the (fictional) independent nation of Besco to try and negotiate on behalf of the Canadian government for mining rights. Danielle Richard (Macha Grenon), is the newly elected president of Besco. She wants to renegotiate the deal that her predecessors struck with the Canadian government as she finds the terms unfavourable. Additionally the Canadian government has not been adhering to the terms that they had previously agreed to. The two parties meet in secret in a school gym to hash out a deal, with mediator Emily Price (Emily VanCamp) assigned to stay neutral.

Initially progress seems to be being made; the Canadian delegation offers to help subsidize some of the costs of mining and environmental protection and offer to help put pressure on the Canadian mining company, Sherman, to help the Besco government. However they abruptly pull out of negotiations and Torpe, the lead Canadian delegate tells president Richard that she must grant Sherman the rights to the mine or Canada will never agree to looser restrictions that will let Besco expand their fishing industry.
