= Kuproquo =

1999 Canadian short film

- Film poster
- Directed by: Jean-François Rivard
- Written by: Jean-François Rivard
- Produced by: Marie-Josée Larocque; (executive producers): Christiane Ciupka; Denis Martel
- Starring: Alain Zouvi; Maude Guérin
- Cinematography: Jean-François Lord
- Edited by: Sylvain Lebel
- Production companies: Locomotions Films; Films Equinox
- Distributed by: Equinox
- Release date: July 1999
- Running time: 13 minutes
- Country: Canada
- Language: French

Kuproquo is a 1999 Canadian short comedy drama film, the fourth to be written and directed by Jean-François Rivard, about what happens when a six-year-old boy asks an awkward question at the dinner table and his parents struggle to come up with an answer. The short has won several international prizes.

== Title ==
Kuproquo is an invented portmanteau made up of the French words cul (pronounced ku), "ass", and quiproquo, derived from the Latin phrase quid pro quo, but having a narrower meaning: "a thing mistaken for another thing".

== Plot summary ==
A cold open of an ordinary quiet evening at home in which a family of three are about to have dinner. At the dining table, six-year-old Jérémie asks what "bugger" means. (Note: In the original French: enculé, past participle form of enculer, also given in some sources.) Black and white images of the parents and Jérémie from a few years past flow, set to music.

The boy's parents are taken completely by surprise, asking where he heard that word; he tells them (someone named Olivier), and they proceed to argue over possible bad influences. Charles also complains that francophones use unhelpful words like "bugger" and prefers "ass hole". (Note: In the sense of anus: trou du cul.) His son knows what that word means, at least. Jérémie repeats his question.

Charles claims he does not know, which draws an immediate objection from Geneviève. Charles now tells the boy his mother will explain. Again Geneviève objects, pointing out that Charles is a psychologist. Increasingly rattled, Charles lights a cigarette at the table and asks Geneviève to tell their son something while he tries to come up with a real answer. She uses a gardening metaphor, explaining that "buggering" is like planting carrots in an alley rather than in the ground. Charles calls the explanation infantile and out of date, harking back to the psychology of the 1950s. Children are not stupid, he says, and should be told how things really are.

While Jérémie plays on his Nintendo, his parents debate what to say. Neither wants to reveal the ins and outs of sex between a mommy and daddy to their six-year-old son, never mind anal sex and possibly homosexuality, particularly Charles, prompting Geneviève to ask him if he has gay thoughts when the two of them have anal sex, which turns their discussion into a heated conversation about their sex life and attitudes towards sex. Charles is surprised that Geneviève does not really like anal sex, as sometimes it is painful. She argues angrily that a man's desire for it is based on a need to express virility by asserting dominance over his partner, and calls out to Jérémie to return to the kitchen, repeating Charles' words to him about children.

Charles tells Jérémie he should not use "bugger" anymore, as it's a bad word. He tells his son that "buggering" is like a rear-end collision. Apparently satisfied, the boy asks if he can play on his Nintendo again and Charles says yes, and lights another cigarette as his wife stares at him.

At the school playground, Jérémie takes Charles' explanation literally, running into another boy, knocking him over, and shouting: "I buggered you! I buggered you!". He is asked where he learned the word, leading to a gross misunderstanding, as the boy overheard his parents talking about their anal sex acts. His half-understood version of life at home leads to Charles being arrested by the police and a visit with Geneviève from child protection services.

Music plays again with a fade to black and the end credits roll.

== Cast ==
- Alain Zouvi • Charles
- Maude Guérin • Geneviève
- Jeremy T. Gaudet • Jérémie
- Sylvia Gariépy • Maîtresse d'école (Schoolteacher)
- Luc Dagenais • Agent de la DPJ (Child protection officer)

Lorsque j'étais petit, ma cousine plus vieille que moi, aimait me chanter des chansons obscènes. Elle m'avait aussi raconté une blague sur la sodomie que je racontais sans la comprendre. Mon père me trouvait drôle jusqu'à ce que je lui demande de me l'expliquer.

— Jean-François Rivard

The police officers were portrayed by Michel Boily and Ricardo Troggi.

== Inspiration and themes ==
Aujourd'hui, nous sommes tous bombardés d'informations, il n'y a presque plus de tabou et les enfants n'y échappent pas. On les dit plus précoces qu'autrefois sûrement à cause de la surinformation. Comme expliquer à un enfant des concepts comme le suicide, la sodomie, l'avortement, etc.? Le film propose ce questionnement.

— Jean-François Rivard

Jean-François Rivard said the idea for the story arose from his own childhood, when his older cousin used to sing off-colour songs, and once told him a sodomy joke which he retold but without understanding it. His father thought it was funny until the young Rivard asked him to explain it.

=== Taboo topics and children in the Information Age ===
People living in an Information Age are bombarded with unfiltered information, children included, who seem more precocious than past generations due to the excess of information available, making questions like the boy's more likely. The film asks how parents and society deal with their questions when they arise: how one explains taboo (adult) concepts like suicide, sodomy, abortion to a child.

== Production ==
=== Background and financing ===
Locomotion Films, part of the Montreal Exponent Group, comprising commercial houses La Fabrique d'Images and S.W.A.T Films, and post- and digital effects house Buzz Image Group, was officially launched the same year as the film's release in 1999 with a view to developing English- and French-track feature films, television series, and dramatic shorts like Kuproquo and Jean-François Asselin's La Petite Histoire d'un homme sans histoire. Marc S. Grenier, one of Locomotion's producers, said the Group was ready "to do something entirely serious", moving into fiction after working many years in commercials. Executive producer Denis Martel was also president of Locomotion.

Kuproquo is Jean-François Rivard's fourth short film, the third following his debut Kopps, which won two prizes at the Vidéaste competition in 1997.

The project received funding from both provincial and federal levels of government, including SODEC, Telefilm Canada, and Radio-Canada.

=== Casting and characters ===
Rivard said that in most of his previous films, he enjoys putting his characters into embarrassing situations and watching them try to extricate themselves from them. Normally, the characters are in their twenties, but for Kuproquo, he wanted to "change universe" and focus on a slice of life of two young parents in their thirties.

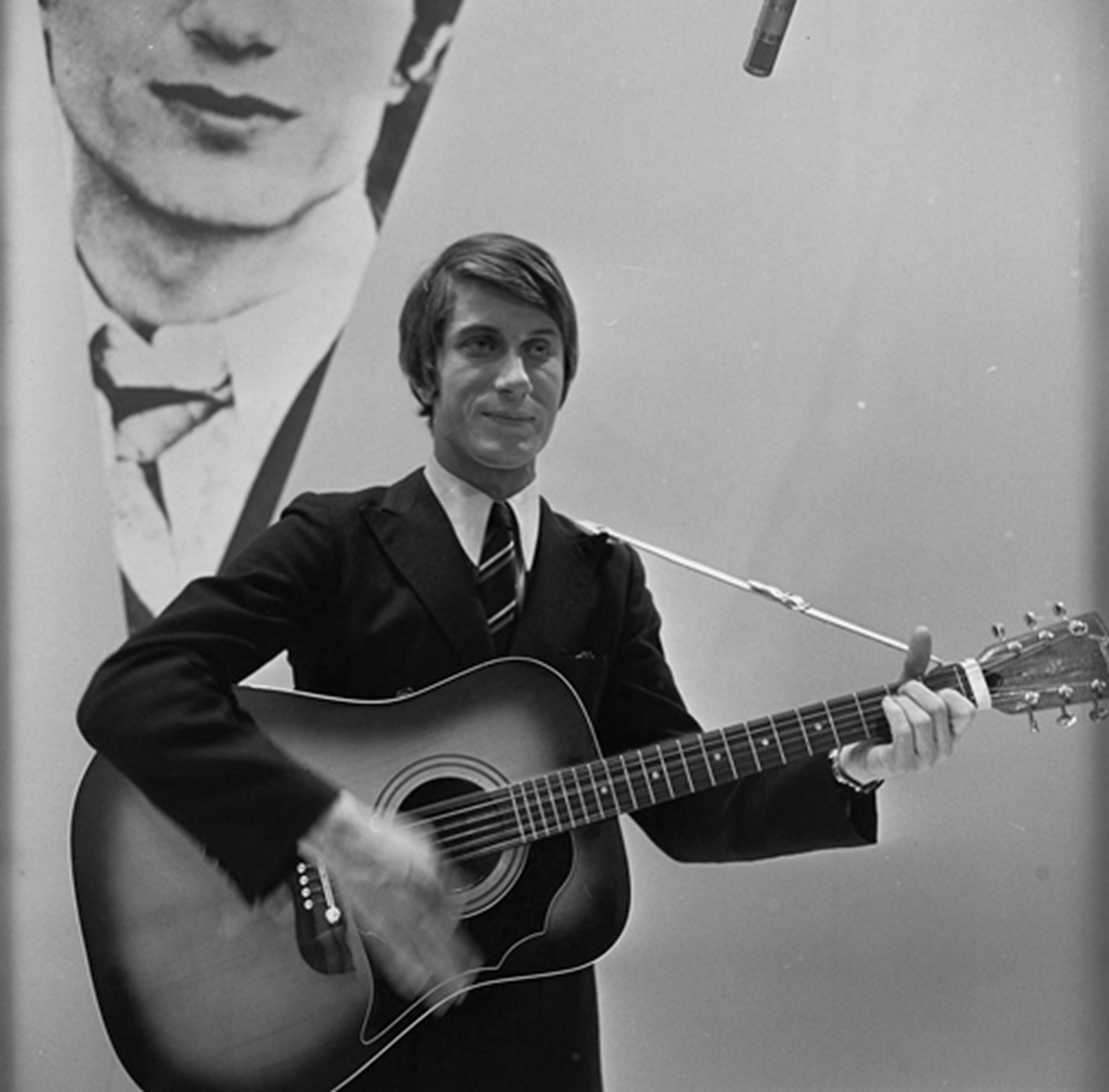
Jacques Dutronc in 1966

=== Filming and music ===
Kuproquo was shot on 16 mm film and then blown up to 35 mm.

The song which plays over the brief title sequence following the cold open and during the end credits is "Fais pas ci, fais pas ça", the second track from Jacques Dutronc's second self-titled studio album (1968).

== Release ==
Released in July 1999, Kuproquo was one of a very few contemporary Quebec films to reach a wider audience, according to Michel Coulombe. In November, it was reported that the short was expected to be shown accompanying another (unspecified) French-Canadian feature film in Quebec theatres.

=== Home media ===
Kuproquo was released on both VHS and DVD formats in 1999 and 2000, and on DVD again in 2009.

=== Streaming ===
The short has been available for streaming from TOU.TV since 2010.

== Reception ==
Kuproquo is described both as a "successful" and "quality" film.

=== Critical response ===
Denise Pelletier called Kuproquo a well directed and very funny film with excellent actors, subjecting contemporary québecois to scrutiny through a lens tinged with irony: Charles and Geneviève believe they are a modern open minded couple but balk when confronted by a frustratingly embarrassing question from their son. However, Rivard does not sit in judgement over them; more like a spectator, he presents a point of view with his particular form of transposition: a good dose of humour.

=== Audience response ===
Rivard was stunned by the positive audience reactions at each screening of his film at the many film festivals in Quebec.

=== Selected accolades ===
Kuproquo won many international prizes over several years.

==== Awards ====
- 5th Rencontres du court métrage de Saint Benoît (Saint Benoît, Réunion, April 2001) • Prix du Public
- Comedia (Just For Laughs Film Festival) • Prix du Public (2002)

==== Nomination ====
The short was nominated for Best Live Action Short Drama at the 20th Genie Awards (2000) but lost to Moving Day.
