= Familiprix =

- Formerly: Médico-Prix (1977–1979)
- Industry: Pharmacy
- Founded: 1977
- Headquarters: Quebec City, Quebec, Canada
- Area served: Quebec, New Brunswick
- Website: familiprix.com

Familiprix is a Canadian group of independent pharmacists. As of 2019, Familiprix consists of almost 400 pharmacies with over $1 billion in retail sales. Familiprix's network employs more than 6,000 and covers all of Quebec and part of New Brunswick. The banner's pharmacies are organized by surface area into three categories: clinic, commercial, and extra. Familiprix is the 29th largest company in Quebec's top 500 list and is among the 150 most admired companies in Quebec.

== History ==
Médico-Prix started in 1977 in Eastern Quebec. It was renamed Familiprix on 17 October 1979. In the mid-1990s, it expanded into Montreal. In 2001, Familiprix acquires a large piece of land in the Armand-Viau industrial park in Québec City for its new head office and distribution centre in order to centralize its operations. The distribution centre was expended in 2009 and in 2018.

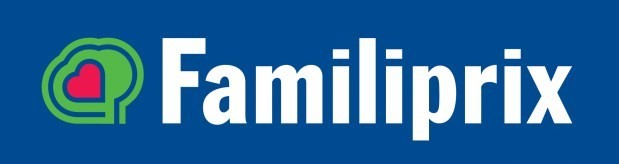
Logo until 2015

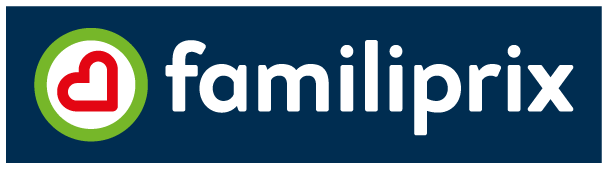
Logo since 2015

During the 2000s, actor Sylvain Marcel became the star of a series of Familiprix humorous TV commercials and Familiprix's corporate website. He plays a pharmacist in a white lab coat that blends in everyday situations, only to suddenly yell "Ah-ha! Familiprix!" when the help of a pharmacist is needed: when a shopper bangs herself against a window, when an ex-smoker bums a cigarette or when a young couple is home alone for the week-end. The signature song of these ad campaigns is Huey "Piano" Smith's "Don't You Just Know It."
