= Pierre Szalowski =

Quebecois screenwriter and novelist

Pierre Szalowski (born 1959) is a Canadian screenwriter and novelist.

In 2009 he won the Grand prix de la relève littéraire Archambault for Froid modifie la trajectoire des poissons (English: Fish Change Direction in Cold Weather). The same year, he was profiled in an episode of the television series Au Coeur du Cinéma Québécois.

In the past, he has worked as a press photographer and an artistic director in marketing. He lives in Montreal.

== Books ==
- Froid modifie la trajectoire des poissons
- Mais qu’est-ce que tu fais là, tout seul?

== Filmography ==
- 2007 - My Daughter, My Angel (Ma fille mon ange), screenwriter.
- 2011 - Trash (Décharge), screenwriter.
- 2012 - Énergie À tout Prix, director. Documentary, collection of the Cinémathèque québécoise
