= Normand Corbeil (writer) =

Canadian writer

Normand Corbeil is a Canadian writer from Quebec. He is most noted as cowriter with Louis Godbout of the film A Revision (Une révision), for which they received a Prix Iris nomination for Best Screenplay at the 24th Quebec Cinema Awards in 2022.

A former professor of philosophy at the Cégep du Vieux Montréal, he has published the novels Un congé forcé (1996), Voix (2004), Ma reine (2006) and Les années-tennis (2010).
