= Suspicions (film) =

- Film poster
- French: Jaloux
- Directed by: Patrick Demers
- Written by: Sophie Cadieux; Patrick Demers; Maxime Denommée; Benoît Gouin
- Produced by: Cédric Bourdeau; Stéphane Tanguay
- Starring: Maxime Denommée; Sophie Cadieux; Benoît Gouin
- Cinematography: Tobie Marier-Robitaille
- Edited by: Patrick Demers
- Music by: Ramachandra Borcar
- Production company: Productions Kinesis
- Release date: July 9, 2010 (Karlovy Vary)
- Running time: 100 minutes
- Country: Canada
- Language: French

Suspicions (French: Jaloux, lit. 'Jealous') is a Canadian thriller film, directed by Patrick Demers and released in 2010. The film stars Maxime Denommée and Sophie Cadieux as Thomas and Marianne, an unhappy couple who are spending time at a cottage in the country to sort out their relationship issues, whose plans are complicated by the intrusions of neighbour Jean (Benoît Gouin). The film, an expansion of his earlier short film Discharge (Décharge), was largely unscripted, with the actors allowed to improvise much of their own dialogue.

The film premiered on July 9, 2010, at the Karlovy Vary Film Festival. and had its Canadian premiere at the 2010 Toronto International Film Festival.

The film received two Genie Award nominations, for Best Editing (Demers) and Best Original Score (Ramachandra Borcar), at the 32nd Genie Awards in 2012. The original short film Discharge, which starred Pierre Brassard, Pierre Gendron and Sonia Vigneault, was the winner of the award for Best Canadian Short Film at the 1999 Toronto International Film Festival.

== Plot summary ==
After 8 years together and a relationship on the rocks, Thomas takes his wife Marianne to his uncle Michel's cottage for a weekend getaway to try to smooth things over. During an argument on the way, their car gets stuck in a ditch and they finish the journey on foot. Upon their arrival they are surprised to find Benoît, owner of the neighboring cottage, who, anticipating the arrival of Michel and his wife, had prepared them dinner. He instead shares the meal with Thomas and Marianne. The next day, leaving Marianne at the cottage while he goes looking for a tow truck, Thomas learns on the trip that Benoît is not who he claims to be.

== Cast ==
- Maxime Denommée as Thomas
- Sophie Cadieux as Marianne
- Benoît Gouin as Jean Messier
- Emmanuelle Rochon as Sylvie
- Mark Latrémouille as Ben
- Marc Beaupré as Steve
- Raphaël Roussel as Mat
- Daniel Malenfant as Luc
- Christine Beaulieu as Nancy
- Maryève Alary as Geneviève
- Jean-Yves Gaudreault as Garagiste
- Daniel Gadouas as Michel
- Marie-France Lambert as Hélène
