= The Parking Spot (film) =

- French: La Place
- Directed by: Louis Godbout
- Screenplay by: Louis Godbout
- Produced by: Sébastien Poussard
- Starring: Maxim Gaudette; Christine Beaulieu; Benoît Gouin
- Cinematography: Jean-François Lord
- Edited by: Claude Palardy
- Music by: Martin Léon
- Production company: Les Films Primatice
- Distributed by: Funfilm Distribution
- Release date: June 16, 2026 (Shanghai)
- Country: Canada
- Language: French

The Parking Spot (French: La Place) is a Canadian thriller film, written and directed by Louis Godbout and released in 2026. The film stars Maxim Gaudette and Christine Beaulieu as a couple with simmering tensions between them, whose plan to go out for dinner is disrupted when they get into a battle of wills with a stranger (Benoît Gouin) over a parking spot.

The cast also includes Alexa-Jeanne Dubé, Maxime Genois and Domenic Di Rosa in supporting roles.

The film premiered at the 2026 Shanghai International Film Festival, with its Canadian premiere slated for the 30th Fantasia International Film Festival. It is scheduled to go into commercial release on August 28.

At Shanghai, The Hollywood Reporter characterized it as the most-talked about film in the festival program, dividing audiences "in the best possible way".
