= Nour Belkhiria =

Canadian actress

Nour Belkhiria (born 26 November 1995) is a Tunisian-Canadian actress from Montreal, Quebec. She is most noted for her performance as Ismène in the film Antigone, for which she won the Canadian Screen Award for Best Supporting Actress at the 8th Canadian Screen Awards.

She received a Prix Iris nomination for Best Actress at the 24th Quebec Cinema Awards in 2022, for her performance as Nacira in A Revision (Une révision).

In 2023 she appeared in the film Days of Happiness (Les Jours heureux).

In 2022, she starred as Inès Saiid in "Indéfendable", a daily show in Québec, Canada.
