= Days of Happiness =

2023 Canadian film by Chloé Robichaud

- Film poster
- French: Les jours heureux
- Directed by: Chloé Robichaud
- Written by: Chloé Robichaud
- Produced by: Pierre Even; Paul-E. Audet
- Starring: Sophie Desmarais; Sylvain Marcel; Nour Belkhiria; Maude Guérin
- Cinematography: Ariel Méthot-Bellemare
- Edited by: Yvann Thibaudeau
- Production company: Item 7
- Distributed by: Maison 4:3
- Release date: September 8, 2023 (TIFF)
- Running time: 118 minutes
- Country: Canada
- Language: French

Days of Happiness (French: Les jours heureux) is a 2023 Canadian drama film written and directed by Chloé Robichaud. The film stars Sophie Desmarais as Emma, an orchestra conductor who is navigating her toxic relationship with her father and agent Patrick (Sylvain Marcel) and her budding new romantic relationship with Naëlle (Nour Belkhiria) as she considers a great new career opportunity with a prestigious orchestra.

== Cast ==
- Sophie Desmarais as Emma
- Sylvain Marcel as Patrick
- Nour Belkhiria as Naëlle
- Maude Guérin
- Vincent Leclerc
- Yves Jacques
- Katherine Levac

== Production ==
Members of the Orchestre Métropolitain perform in the film as the orchestra Emma leads, and real-life OM conductor Yannick Nézet-Séguin served as a creative consultant on the film to ensure that it represented the dynamics of orchestral performance and management accurately.

== Release ==
Days of Happiness had its world premiere at the 2023 Toronto International Film Festival on September 8, 2023. It was slated to be commercially released in October 2023.

== Critical response ==
Pat Mullen of That Shelf wrote that "Comparisons to Tár are inevitable, but any similarity begins and end with the lead characters being lesbian conductors with a grasp for Mahler. (Although one can easily imagine an alternate ending to Days of Happiness that sees Emma conducting Monster Hunter after hitting rock bottom!) Where Lydia Tár is a virtuoso, but kind of an awful person (deliciously so), Emma desperately needs to escape her toxic relationships. She unravels when she approaches the precipice of losing everything."

He praised Desmarais's performance, writing that she "daringly commits to her performance and creates a character with a dynamic psyche. Emma’s career demands her to be a conductor in the sense of the word that’s synonymous with a conduit. She must interpret emotional traits of a piece and translate that for the orchestra. Desmarais therefore affords Emma great emotional intelligence and depth. Music is Emma’s only outlet and Desmarais channels these emotions into her hand movements and posture, creating a character who exudes musicality."

== Awards ==
Award	Date of ceremony	Category	Recipient(s)	Result	Ref.
Directors Guild of Canada	2023	Best Direction in a Feature Film	Chloé Robichaud	Nominated	
Prix Iris	December 8, 2024	Best Actress	Sophie Desmarais	Nominated	
Prix Iris	December 8, 2024	Best Sound	Sylvain Bellemare, Luc Boudrias, François Goupil, Stephen De Oliveira	Nominated	
