= Dragons 3D =

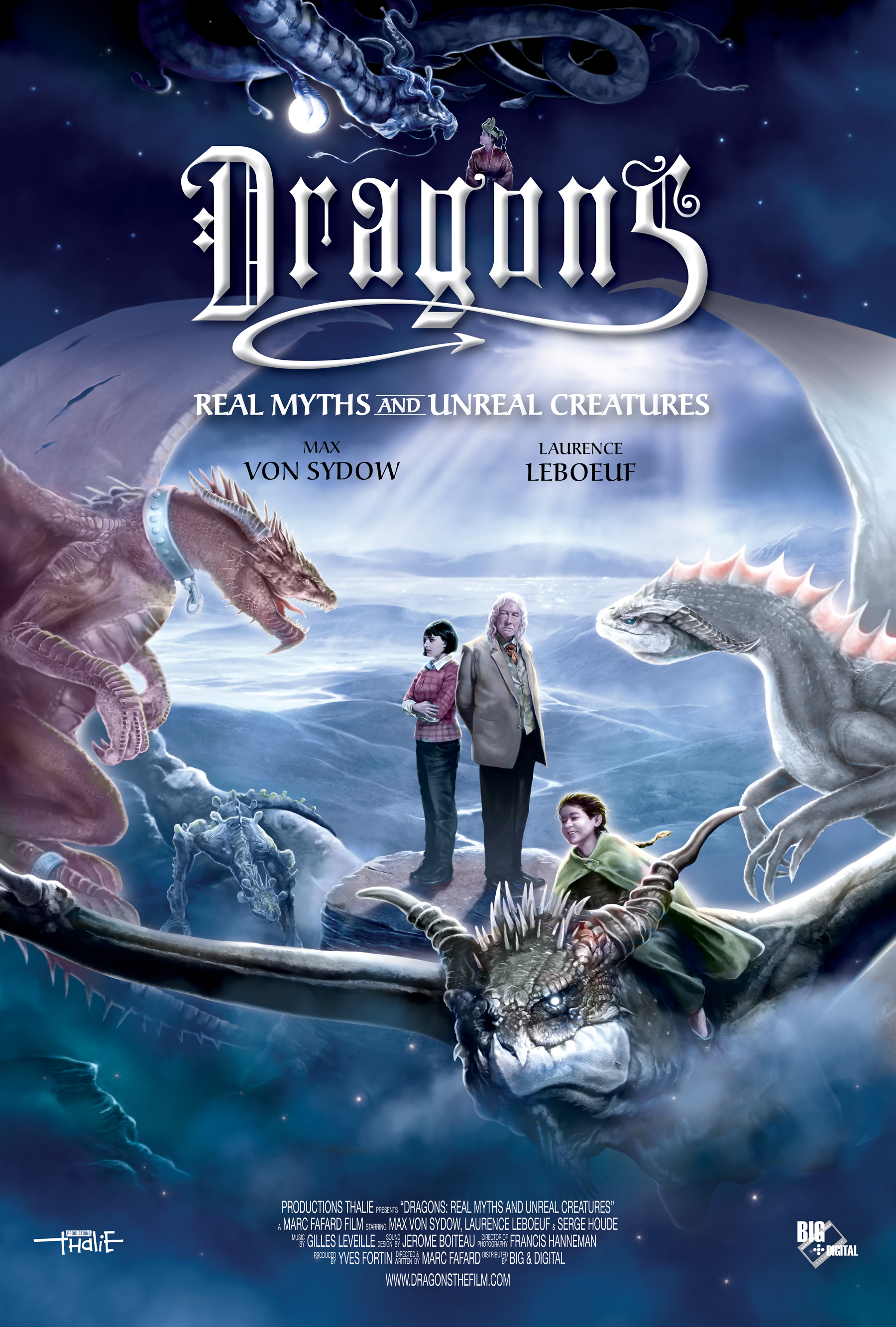
- This 3D film for giant screen theaters delves into the rich history and folklore of dragons.
- Directed by: Marc Fafard
- Written by: Marc Fafard
- Produced by: Yves Fortin
- Starring: Max von Sydow, Laurence Leboeuf, Serge Houde
- Cinematography: Francis Hanneman and Sean McLeod Philips
- Music by: Gilles Léveillé
- Animation by: Studio Élément, Digital Dimension, Frima Studios
- Distributed by: BIG and Digital, LLC
- Release date: June 14, 2013
- Running time: 43 minutes
- Country: Canada
- Languages: English, French, Spanish

Dragons 3D (also known as Dragons: Real Myths and Unreal Creatures - 2D/3D) is a 2013 short 3D film for IMAX and Giant Screen Theaters. The movie was directed and written by Marc Fafard, and stars Max von Sydow as a dream therapist trying to help a young woman who has frequent nightmares about dragons. Dragons 3D is filmed in a docu-fictional approach and utilizes computer-generated imagery to explore the legends and science surrounding dragons from countries such as China, Japan, Mesopotamia, and the United Kingdom.

Of the film, Leboeuf commented that she found the cultural differences between the various depictions of dragons interesting, especially as she saw that many anthropologists didn't have a fully satisfactory answer as to their ongoing popularity in modern-day society. Max von Sydow echoed these statements and added that he had been interested in dragons and mythology since childhood, as he learned about various different folklores from his father, who worked as an ethnologist.

== Synopsis ==
Skye Ingram (Laurence Leboeuf) has had frequent nightmares about dragons, to the point where it's interfering with her daily life. Because of this, she decides to seek help from Dr. Alistair Conis (Max von Sydow), an eccentric dream therapist and expert on dragons. As the pair works together to uncover what is triggering Skye's distress, they recount the various stories about dragons and their connections to various facets of human and natural society, such as history, literature, national identity, and art. Their work is eventually discovered by Dr. Vulnet Grazinar (Serge Houde), Dr. Conis' nemesis.

== Cast ==
- Max von Sydow as Dr. Alistair Conis
- Laurence Leboeuf as Skye Ingram
- Serge Houde as Dr. Vulnet Grazinar

== Reception ==
La Presse gave Dragons 3D three stars, praising it for its visual aspects while commenting that the film did not work as well on the narrative level, while stating that it was overall a good film with "several spectacular sequences". The Metro News gave an overall favorable review, stating that it would be a good film for younger viewers.

In contrast, The Davis Clipper gave it one and a half stars, also praising the movie's visuals while criticizing the film for not making more of an effort to tie in the dragons' mythology into their historical context or provide an analysis or sociological framework.
