= Coda (2019 film) =

2019 film by Claude Lalonde

- Official promotional poster in the United States
- Directed by: Claude Lalonde
- Written by: Louis Godbout
- Produced by: Nicolas Comeau
- Starring: Patrick Stewart; Katie Holmes; Giancarlo Esposito
- Cinematography: Guy Dufaux
- Edited by: Claude Palardy
- Production company: Clinamen Films
- Distributed by: Filmoption International
- Release dates: November 22, 2019 (IFFI); June 3, 2022 (Canada)
- Running time: 100 minutes
- Country: Canada
- Language: English
- Box office: $2.6 million

Coda (Note: Also known by the alternative title of CODA: Life With Music in Canada.) is a 2019 Canadian drama film directed by Claude Lalonde (in his directorial debut) and written by Louis Godbout. The film stars Patrick Stewart, Katie Holmes, and Giancarlo Esposito. It follows a famous pianist struggling with stage fright late in his career who finds inspiration from a free-spirited music critic.

== Plot ==
Henry Cole is an acclaimed classical pianist at the twilight of his career. He returns to the stage after a long absence following the death of his wife only to discover that his performance is marred by stage fright and overall mental instability. He barely escapes catastrophe as he suffers an anxiety attack on stage, running outside after finishing a number and smoking a cigarette.

At a post-recital press conference, he meets Helen Morrison, a music critic for The New Yorker. She wants to write a story about him and unsuccessfully asks for an interview. They meet again a few days later at Steinway Hall, where Henry suffers another episode while attempting to perform. Helen rescues him in extremis and earns his trust. Henry finally agrees to the interview.

Meanwhile, despite his agent Paul’s best efforts, Henry’s mental condition declines steadily. His recitals become more and more perilous, thus jeopardizing his comeback tour and his much anticipated and publicized final concert in London.

Helen urges Henry to travel to Sils Maria in the Swiss Alps to hear another pianist she once knew, famous for the therapeutic effect of his interpretation of Beethoven’s late piano sonatas. Once there, Henry’s symptoms at first worsen, but he gradually finds solace through walks in nature, curious but empathetic encounters with strangers, spirited chess matches with Felix, a hotel porter, and the music of Beethoven.

== Cast ==
- Patrick Stewart as Sir Henry Cole, a talented pianist
- Katie Holmes as Helen Morrison, a reporter for The New Yorker
- Giancarlo Esposito as Paul, Henry's agent
- Beat Marti as Ludwig van Beethoven
- Christoph Gaugler as Felix, owner of the inn in Sils Maria

== Production ==
Stewart spent 3–4 months learning to play piano in order to look like he could play it but still had a body double for the close-up shots.

The film was shot in Montreal, Quebec, with scenes at the Montreal Symphony House. It was also shot in Switzerland.

== Music ==
The musical numbers in the film are performed by Ukrainian-born pianist Serhiy Salov, who also makes a cameo appearance.

== Release ==
Coda had its world premiere in the World Panorama section of the International Film Festival of India on November 22, 2019. The film was released direct-to-VOD in the United States by Gravitas Ventures on January 31, 2020. It was theatrically released in Canada by Filmoption International on June 3, 2022.

== Reception ==
=== Critical response ===
On the review aggregator website Rotten Tomatoes, 58% of 12 critics' reviews are positive, with an average rating of 5.7/10.

Richard Roeper of the Chicago Sun-Times gave the film three stars out of four, and stated, "Coda is a great-looking film, filled with dagger-sharp dialogue, wonderful performances and, as you’d expect, a wondrous and heavenly score, courtesy of Bach and Beethoven, Chopin and Schubert." Joe Leydon of Variety called it "predictable yet compelling" and commented that "the time-tripping structure of Godbout's screenplay makes it all too easy to predict all too early how the narrative ultimately will conclude." Leydon also wrote that "the film's overall tact and discretion enhances the dramatic and emotional evolution of the bond between Henry and Helen, which is rendered with low-key sincerity by a scrupulously restrained Stewart and an arrestingly ambiguous Holmes."

John DeFore of The Hollywood Reporter gave Coda a negative review, criticizing the script for "[being] less persuasive: No single event is fatally implausible, perhaps, but taken together it doesn't ring true" and its "hunger for faux-deep metaphor." Leslie Felperin of The Guardian gave the film two stars out of five and described it as "one of those films where nothing much seems to happen at all." Felperin concluded her review by stating, "Stewart seems to be sleepwalking his way through this, falling back on his sonorous voice to do the heavy dramatic lifting while poor Holmes struggles with a character so beatifically written, I was expecting her to be revealed as a figment of Henry's imagination."
