= Stranger in a Cab =

2014 Canadian drama film

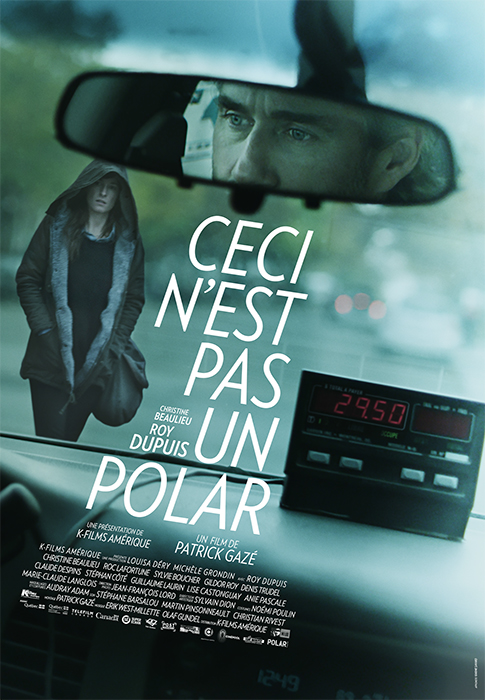
- Film poster
- French: Ceci n'est pas un polar
- Directed by: Patrick Gazé
- Written by: Patrick Gazé
- Produced by: Louisa Déry; Michèle Grondin
- Starring: Roy Dupuis; Christine Beaulieu
- Cinematography: Jean-François Lord
- Edited by: Patrick Gazé
- Production company: Productions Mi-Lou
- Distributed by: K-Films Amérique
- Release date: October 9, 2014
- Running time: 119 minutes
- Country: Canada
- Language: French

Stranger in a Cab (French: Ceci n'est pas un polar, lit. "This is not a thriller") is a Canadian drama film, directed by Patrick Gazé and released in 2014. The film stars Roy Dupuis as André Kosinski, a lonely taxi driver in Montreal who begins a passionate affair with Marianne (Christine Beaulieu) after she is a passenger in his cab, only to become concerned that she may have been involved in a crime.

Brendan Kelly of the Montreal Gazette reviewed the film positively, writing that "You could call writer-director Patrick Gazé’s debut feature a Québécois Taxi Driver but that would be misleading. Like the classic 1976 Martin Scorsese film, Gazé’s Ceci n’est pas un polar — which translates as This Is Not a Thriller — is a drama focusing on a troubled cabbie driving the mean streets of a North American city. But that’s where the comparison ends." He further singled out Dupuis's performance in the film as one of the strongest of his career.

The film premiered on October 9, 2014 at the Festival International du Film Francophone de Namur, and had its Canadian premiere at the Abitibi-Témiscamingue International Film Festival on October 25.
