= Sarah Prefers to Run =

2013 film

- Canadian poster
- Directed by: Chloé Robichaud
- Written by: Chloé Robichaud
- Produced by: Fanny-Laure Malo
- Starring: Sophie Desmarais
- Cinematography: Jessica Lee Gagné
- Release dates: 21 May 2013 (Cannes); 7 June 2013 (Canada)
- Running time: 94 minutes
- Country: Canada
- Language: French

Sarah Prefers to Run (French: Sarah préfère la course) is a 2013 Canadian drama film written and directed by Chloé Robichaud. It was screened in the Un Certain Regard section at the 2013 Cannes Film Festival. It won the Women in Film & Television Vancouver Artistic Merit Award at the 2013 Vancouver International Film Festival.

== Plot ==
After performing well on her school's track team, Sarah (Sophie Desmarais) is encouraged to go to McGill University to train. When she brings up the idea to her mom, she tells Sarah they don't have the money to help her move. Sarah talks with her co-worker Antoine (Jean-Sébastien Courchesne) about wanting to go to Montreal, who is looking for a change of scenery. The both of them decide to move to Montreal and live together as roommates, with Antoine footing the bill for their move and helping her financially with the apartment. On their way to Montreal, Antoine suggests that they marry in order to obtain financing available to young couples in university. Sarah shrugs him off initially, but eventually agrees to the idea, and the two of them get married.

Once at school, Sarah quickly becomes overwhelmed with the financial responsibilities of being enrolled in the running program. She meets a fellow runner named Zoey and befriends her.

At a student party, while watching Zoey singing karaoke, Sarah begins to feel her heart speed up. She is taken to the hospital by Antoine, where she learns that she has a heart condition that could prevent her from running. The doctor refers her to a cardiologist. During the cardiology appointment, she is told to wear a device that measures her heart rate and keep a journal of her physical activity.

On one of Sarah's nights off, she and Antoine hang out together at home. Over dinner, Antoine kisses her, and the two have sex. The following day, Sarah tells him that sleeping with him was a one time thing. Antoine later gets drunk and confesses that he loves Sarah despite not really knowing why, and asks for a divorce. He decides to move back to Quebec City, but tells Sarah that he will continue paying for their apartment for a few months until she can land on her feet.

Before a track meet, Sarah stands in the bathroom, looking at the heart monitoring equipment she is wearing. She decides to take it off and to continue running anyway.

== Cast ==
- Sophie Desmarais as Sarah
- Jean-Sébastien Courchesne as Antoine
- Hélène Florent as Isabelle
- Micheline Lanctôt as Coach Gendron
- Geneviève Boivin-Roussy as Zoey
- Benoît Gouin as Richard
- Ève Duranceau as Fanny
- Julianne Côté as Françoise
