= The Cheaters (2022 film) =

2022 Canadian comedy film

- French: Les Tricheurs
- Directed by: Louis Godbout
- Written by: Louis Godbout
- Produced by: Sébastien Poussard; Vanessa Mujica-Garcia
- Starring: Christine Beaulieu; Benoît Gouin; Alexandre Goyette; Steve Laplante
- Cinematography: Jean-François Lord
- Edited by: Claude Palardy
- Music by: Jean Massicotte; Guy Bernier
- Production company: Les Films Primatice
- Distributed by: K-Films Amérique
- Release date: March 25, 2022 (Sonoma)
- Running time: 92 minutes
- Country: Canada
- Language: French

The Cheaters (French: Les Tricheurs) is a Canadian comedy film, directed by Louis Godbout and released in 2022. The film centres on Hubert (Benoît Gouin), Florence (Christine Beaulieu) and André (Steve Laplante), three friends who plan a casual game of golf, only to find their afternoon disrupted by Michel (Alexandre Goyette), a stranger whose presence on the golf course brings out simmering tensions and reveals buried secrets.

The cast also includes Joseph Antaki, Jean-Pierre Bergeron, Jean-Carl Boucher, Ben Boudreau, Étienne Dano, Braulio Elicer, Felix Famelart, Mia Fortin, Claude Gasse, Héléna Laliberté, Éric Laporte, Sebastien Poussard and Sébastien René in supporting roles.

The film premiered on March 25, 2022, at the Sonoma International Film Festival, before opening commercially in August 2022.
