= Serhiy Salov =

Canadian pianist of Ukrainian origin (born 1979)

Serhiy Salov Сергій Салов
- Born: 30 May 1979 (age 46); Donetsk, Ukrainian SSR, Soviet Union
- Genres: Classical
- Occupation: Pianist
- Instrument: Piano

Serhiy Salov (Note: Ukrainian: Сергій Салов, romanized: Serhii Salov) (born 30 May 1979) is a Canadian pianist of Ukrainian origin. Born in Donetsk, Ukraine, Salov won First Prize in the piano category of the 2004 Montreal International Musical Competition and Second Prize in the 2010 Gina Bachauer International Artists Competition, in Salt Lake City, Utah. In May 2014 he returned to the Montreal International Musical Competition to win the first Richard Lupien Improvisation Prize.

Salov performs the solo piano music in the 2019 feature film Coda (directed by Claude Lalonde). The film stars Patrick Stewart as a famous concert pianist struggling with anxiety attacks. In addition to using Salov’s recordings of more than 25 classical works that appear to be performed by Stewart’s character Henry Cole, the film features Salov on camera in a brief cameo as a minor character, appearing in the credits as “Ukrainian Pianist.”
