= Sylvain Marcel =

Canadian actor (born 1964)

Sylvain Marcel (born 1964) is a Canadian actor. Marcel is best known in French Canada for appearing in Familiprix television commercials since 2003, and in English Canada for his role in the hit film Bon Cop, Bad Cop as Luc Therrien. He has also appeared in various other films and television shows.

He was a César Award nominee for Best Supporting Actor at the 47th César Awards in 2022, for his performance in the film Aline.

== Biography ==
A man of the theater, actor, and improviser, he worked as a beneficiary attendant (nursing assistant) in a Montreal hospital for about ten years before becoming an actor. He pursued his artistic career simultaneously.

His career took off when he accepted the comedic role of a pharmacist in a series of television commercials for Familiprix, produced by the Alfred agency. Each commercial ended with the same exclamation of satisfaction: "Ah! Ha! Familiprix!" This series captured the popular imagination enough to be referenced in various everyday situations.

Sylvain Marcel announced that 2006 would be the final year featuring his pharmacist character in Familiprix advertisements, as the company wished to move toward a new concept''Echos Vedettes'', June 2006.

In 2020, responding to the government's call for help, he volunteered to work in long-term care homes (CHSLDs). In June and July, he cared for the elderly in the "red zone" of the CHSLD in Rosemère.

In 2021, the international public discovered him in the fictionalized biographical film about Céline Dion, the film Aline by Valérie Lemercier, in which he portrays the music producer Guy-Claude (inspired by René Angélil).

== Filmography ==
=== Film ===
Year	Title	Role	Notes
1997	The Revenge of the Woman in Black	Policier moustachu	
2001	The Woman Who Drinks	Homme de main	
2001	The Pig's Law	Paquette	
2003	Red Nose	Monsieur Paquette	
2003	Noël Blank	Denis	
2006	May God Bless America	Pierre St-Rock	
2006	Bon Cop, Bad Cop	Luc Therrien	
2006	The Secret Life of Happy People	Macho du snack-bar	
2009	The Legacy	Mari de Manon	
2011	Familiar Grounds	Alain	
2011	Gerry	Yves Savoie	
2011	French Immersion	Père Tremblay	
2013	Lac Mystère	Jacques Picard	
2014	Miraculum	Michel Beaudry	
2016	9	Louis	
2017	Father and Guns 2	Ministre de la Justice	
2020	Aline	Guy-Claude Kamar	
2023	Dusk for a Hitman (Crépuscule pour un tueur)	Roger Burns	
2023	Days of Happiness (Les Jours heureux)	Patrick	
2024	All Stirred Up! (Tous toqués!)	Ludger	
2025	Nervures	Toupin	

=== Television ===
Year	Title	Role	Notes
1994	4 et demi...	Client	Episode: "Bouquet de pleurs"
1997	Un gars, une fille	Passager #1	Episode: "Dans le métro/La rénovation 1/À l'hôtel 1"
2000	Chartrand et Simonne	Contestataire	Episode: "L'amour et la guerre: 1942-1945"
2000	On n'est pas là pour s'aimer	Le réceptionniste	Television film
2001	Fortier	Pierre Daoust	Episode: "Elles ne sont qu'une: Part 1"
2002	Bunker, le cirque	Hubald	Episode #1.1
2003	Hommes en quarantaine	Francis Lepage	Television film
2003–2007	450, Chemin du Golf	Sylvain	5 episodes
2004–2005	Le Sketch Show	Sylvain	27 episodes
2005	Les Bougon	Garde chasse	Episode: "Bed & Breakfast"
2005	Détect inc.	Phonzo	Episode: "Le retour de Pépé"
2006–2007	Le négociateur	Léo Piché	13 episodes
2007	Rumeurs	Acheteur de condo	Episode: "Accomodements raisonnables"
2007	Dieu merci!	Un homme d'affaires	Episode #1.5
2007	Les Invincibles	Bernard	6 episodes
2011–2015	19-2	Sergent Julien Houle	24 episodes
2012–2014	Toute la vérité	Enquêteur Denis Payeur	6 episodes
2014–2018	Mensonges	Bob Crépault	40 episodes
2015	For Sarah	Luc Vaillancourt	10 episodes
2019–2021	Les Honorables	Gaétan Dessureaux	10 episodes
2021	Virage	Sylvain Lessard	2 episodes
2023	Good Morning Chuck (Bon matin Chuck, ou l'art de réduire les méfaits)	Lionel	
