= Louis Godbout =

Canadian film director and screenwriter

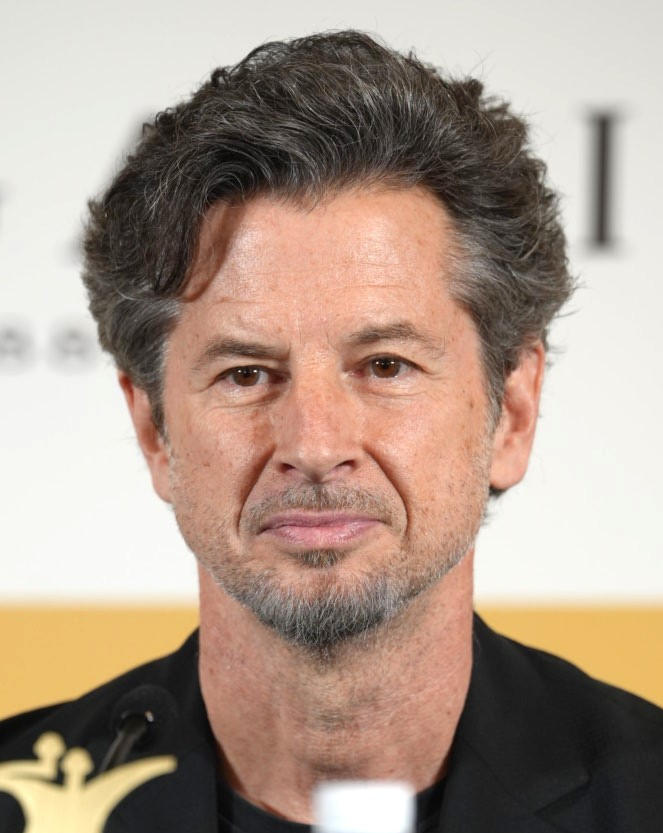
- Godbout in June 2026
- Occupations: Director; Screenwriter

Louis Godbout is a Canadian film director and screenwriter from Quebec.

A former professor of philosophy at the Cégep du Vieux-Montréal, he wrote his Ph.D. thesis on Friedrich Nietzsche. He published several works of philosophical literature, including Du golf, parcours philosophique (2007), Nietzche et la probité (2008), and Hiérarchies (2010).

In 2019 he released his directorial debut Mont Foster, and was the screenwriter of Claude Lalonde's film Coda. His screenplay A Revision (Une révision) was directed by Catherine Therrien and released in 2021, and in 2022 he followed up as director and screenwriter of The Cheaters (Les Tricheurs).

Godbout and cowriter Normand Corbeil received a Prix Iris nomination for Best Screenplay at the 24th Quebec Cinema Awards in 2022 for A Revision.

His 2026 film The Parking Spot (La Place) premiered at the 2026 Shanghai International Film Festival, with its Canadian premiere slated for the 30th Fantasia International Film Festival.
