= Éric Bruneau =

Canadian film and television actor

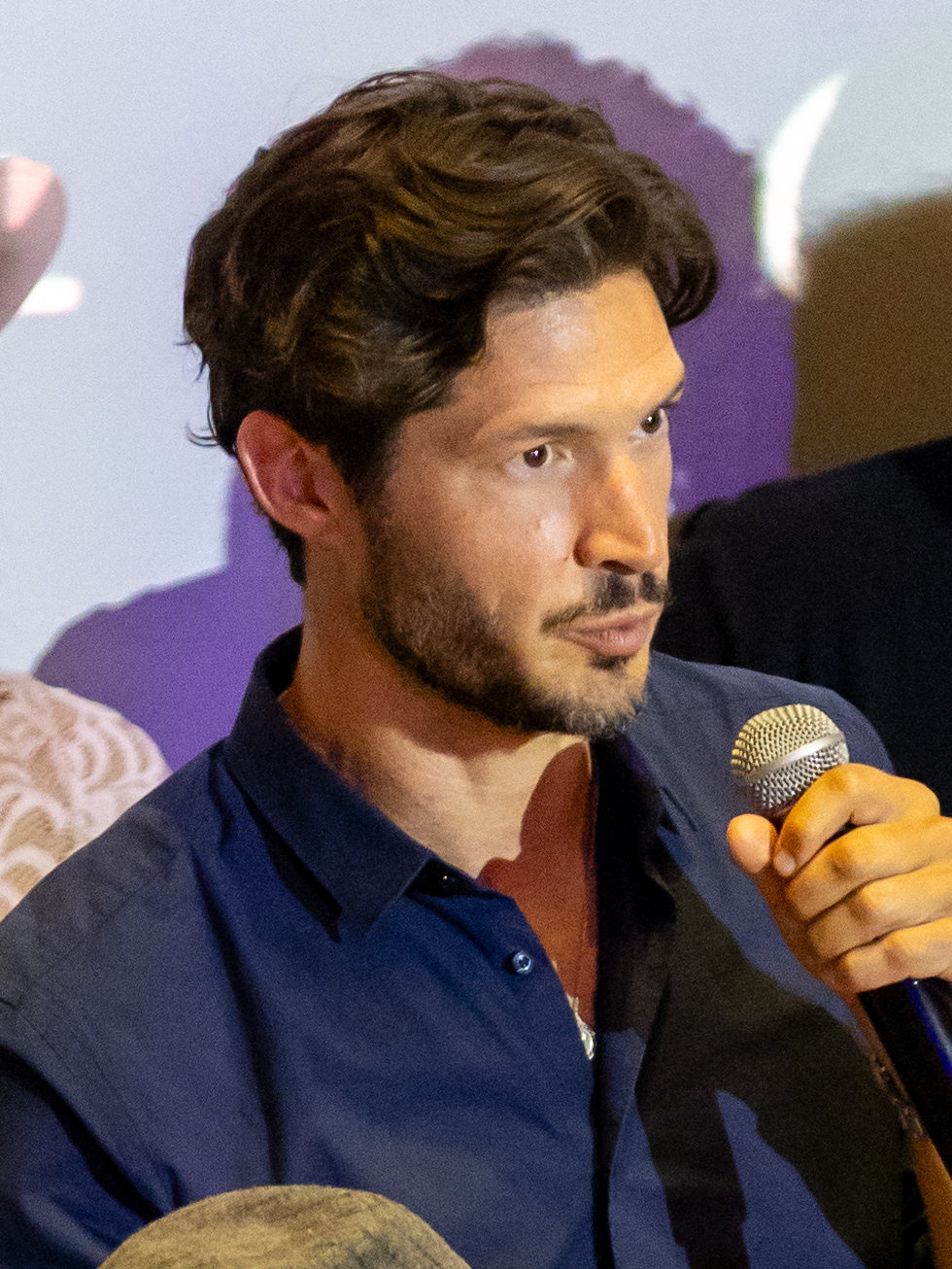
- Born: April 21, 1983 (age 42); Saint-Jean-sur-Richelieu, Quebec, Canada
- Years active: 2005–present

Éric Bruneau (born April 21, 1983) is a Canadian actor. He is most noted for his regular supporting role as Liam Bouchard in the television series Coroner, and his starring role as Charles Rivard in the television series Virage: Double faute.

== Filmography ==
=== Film ===
Year	Title	Role	Notes
2005	The United States of Albert (Les États-Unis d'Albert)	Albert Renaud	
2007	My Daughter, My Angel (Ma fille mon ange)	Young man	
2009	Free Fall (Les Pieds dans le vide)	Rafaël	
2009	Madeleine	Young man	
2010	Heartbeats (Les Amours imaginaires)	Young man 2	
2011	Gerry	Pierre Harel	
2011	Coteau rouge	Janvier Blanchard	
2012	Laurence Anyways	Mathieu	
2012	Écho d'un moment	Alex	
2013	Stay	Luc	
2014	An Eye for Beauty (Le règne de la beauté)	Luc	
2014	Gurov and Anna	Luc	
2018	The Fall of the American Empire (La chute de l'empire américain)	Det. Plamondon	
2019	Goalie	Marcel Pronovost	
2021	Crisis	Guy Broussard	
2022	Sugar	Jules	
2023	Dusk for a Hitman (Crépuscule pour un tueur)	Donald Lavoie	
2024	Ababooned (Ababouiné)	Vicar Cotnoir	
2025	Fanny	Hubert Cloutier	
TBA	Passenger C	Marco	

=== Television ===
Year	Title	Role	Notes
2006	Bon Voyage	Nicolas	Two episodes
2009	Aveux	Young man from the street	One episode
2010	Musée Éden	Étienne Monestie	Nine episodes
2012	Adam & Ève	Marco	Five episodes
2012	Tu m'aimes-tu?	Thomas Landreville	13 episodes
2010-14	Toute la vérité	Sylvain Régimbald	89 episodes
2014-18	Mensonges	Maxime Moreli	40 episodes
2016	Prémonitions	Pascal Deraspe	10 episodes
2016-18	Blue Moon	Milan Garnier	30 episodes
2017-19	Trop	Marc-Antoine	25 episodes
2018	Le Jeu	Julien Forgues	10 episodes
2019	Madame Lebrun	Rich Greenwood	One episode
2019	Les Prodiges		One episode
2019-22	Coroner	Liam Bouchard	23 episodes
2022	Aller simple	Éric Dubois	Three episodes
2022	The Night Logan Woke Up (La nuit où Laurier Gaudreault s'est réveillé)	Denis Larouche	Five episodes
2022	Avant le crash	Marc-André Lévesque	10 episodes
2023	Virage: Double faute	Charles Rivard	Eight episodes
2024	So Long, Marianne	Robert Hershorn	
