= Laurence Leboeuf =

Canadian actress (born 1985)

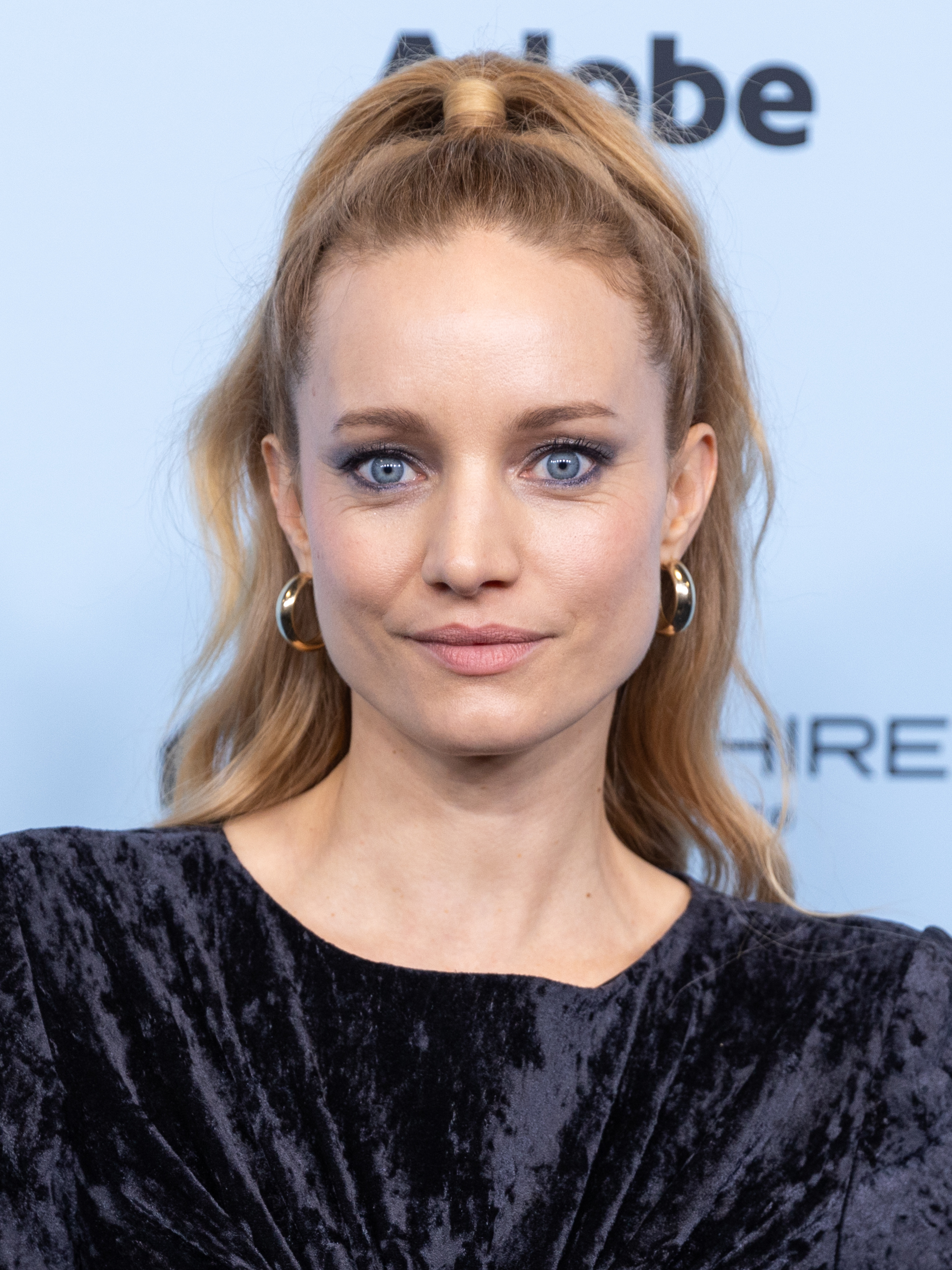
- Leboeuf at the 2025 Sundance Film Festival
- Born: Laurence Charlotte Leboeuf; December 13, 1985 (age 40); Montreal, Quebec, Canada
- Occupation: Actress
- Years active: 1996–present

Laurence Charlotte Leboeuf (born December 13, 1985) is a Canadian actress.

== Early life ==
Leboeuf was born on December 13, 1985, in Montreal, Quebec, the daughter of actors Marcel Leboeuf and Diane Lavallée. She went to École Notre-Dame-de-Grâce for elementary and later on, she went to Villa Maria for high school.

== Career ==
She made her acting debut as Évelyne Boivin in the French Canadian television series Virginie. Later, she played Louise Lavigueur in the Quebec television series Les Lavigueur, la vraie histoire, and more recently as Apple in Turbo Kid.

She won the Prix Jutra for Best Supporting Actress at the 10th Jutra Awards, and received a Genie Award nomination for Best Supporting Actress at the 28th Genie Awards, for her performance in the 2007 film My Daughter, My Angel (Ma fille mon ange). She has also received Canadian Screen Award nominations for Best Supporting Actress in a Drama Series for 19-2 at the 3rd Canadian Screen Awards and the 4th Canadian Screen Awards, and Québec Cinéma nominations for Best Actress at the 17th Jutra Awards for The Little Queen (La petite reine) and at the 18th Quebec Cinema Awards for Turbo Kid.

At the 10th Canadian Screen Awards in 2022, she won the award for Best Actress in a Drama Series for her performance as Magalie Leblanc in Transplant.

== Personal life ==
She is in a romantic relationship with actor and comedian Martin Matte.

== Filmography ==
=== Film ===
Year	Title	Role	Notes	Ref.
2004	L'hôtel de l'avenir	Teenage Girl		
2006	A Family Secret (Le Secret de ma mère)	Jeanne 15–19 ans		
2007	My Daughter, My Angel (Ma fille, mon ange)	Angélique Ménard		
2007	The Secret (Si j'étais toi)	Amelia		
2008	Story of Jen	Jen		
2009	Free Fall (Les Pieds dans le vide)	Manu		
2011	French Immersion	Chantale Tremblay		
2011	Foreverland	Hannah Crane		
2012	The Trouble with Cali	Cali Bluejones		
2012	The Torrent (Le Torrent)	Amica / Young Claudine		
2013	Dragons 3D	Skye Ingram		
2013	An Extraordinary Person (Quelqu'un d'extraordinaire)			
2014	The Little Queen (La Petite Reine)	Julie Arseneau		
2015	Turbo Kid	Apple		
2017	Mother!	Maiden		
2018	Catch and Release	Keely		
2019	Apapacho	Karine		
2019	Mont Foster	Chloé	US distribution by Mbur Indie Film Distribution.	
2025	Two Women (Deux femmes en or)	Violette		
2026	The Stunt Driver	Gloria		

=== Television ===
Year	Title	Role	Notes	Ref.
1996	Virginie	Évelyne Boivin		
1998	L'ombre de l'épervier	Catherine		
2002	Tag – Épilogue	Isabelle Jobin		
2002	Tag II	Isabelle Jobin		
2004–2006	15/Love	Cody Meyers	54 episodes	
2005	Human Trafficking	Nadia	TV miniseries	
2007–2010	Durham County	Sadie Sweeney	18 episodes	
2008	Windfall and Misfortunes	Louise Lavigueur	6 episodes	
2009	Flashpoint	Jessie Wyeth	Episode: "The Perfect Family"	
2009–2010	Being Erica	Claire LeDuc	13 episodes	
2010	Musée Eden	Florence Cuorval	9 episodes	
2010–2014	Trauma	Sophie Léveillée	32 episodes	
2011	Being Human	Young Celine	Episode: "You're the One That I Haunt"; Episode: "A Funny Thing Happened on the Way to Me Killing You"	
2014–2017	19-2	Audrey Pouliot	34 episodes	
2020–2024	Transplant	Dr. Magalie Leblanc	Series regular	
2022–present	Shoresy	Herself	Recurring	
2022	Three Pines	Julia Morrow		

== Awards ==
Year	Award	Category	Film	Result	Ref.
2008	Genie Awards	Best Supporting Actress	My Daughter, My Angel	Nominated	
