= Jean-François Lord =

Canadian cinematographer and film editor

- Occupations: Cinematographer, film editor
- Awards: Canadian Screen Award for Best Cinematography (2011)

Jean-François Lord is a Canadian cinematographer and film editor from Quebec. He is most noted for his work on the film Snow and Ashes, for which he won the Genie Award for Best Cinematography at the 32nd Genie Awards, and was a Jutra Award nominee for Best Cinematography at the 14th Jutra Awards.

== Filmography ==
- Kuproquo - 1999
- Side Orders (Foie de canard et cœur de femme) - 2001
- The Remaining Days (Les Derniers jours) - 2004
- Dodging the Clock (Horloge biologique) - 2005
- A Sentimental Capitalism (Un capitalisme sentimental) - 2008
- Marius Borodine - 2010
- Snow and Ashes - 2010
- The Girl in the White Coat - 2011
- Hope - 2011
- On the Beat (Sur le rythme) - 2011
- La Run - 2011
- Exile (Exil) - 2012
- 4 Minute Mile - 2014
- Stranger in a Cab (Ceci n'est pas un polar) - 2014
- Anna - 2015
- Manor (Manoir) - 2015
- We Are Gold (Nous sommes gold) - 2019
- Mont Foster - 2020
- Dehors Serge dehors - 2021
- The Cheaters (Les Tricheurs) - 2022
- Dusk for a Hitman (Crépuscule pour un tueur) - 2023
- Ru - 2023
- All Stirred Up! (Tous toqués!) - 2024
- Simon and Marianne (Simon et Marianne) - 2024
- Compulsive Liar 2 (Menteuse) - 2025
- The Parking Spot (La Place) - 2026
