= A Revision =

- French: Une révision
- Directed by: Catherine Therrien
- Written by: Louis Godbout; Normand Corbeil
- Produced by: Denise Robert
- Starring: Patrice Robitaille; Nour Belkhiria; Rabah Aït Ouyahia
- Cinematography: Mathieu Laverdière
- Edited by: Arthur Tarnowski
- Music by: Philippe Brault
- Production company: Cinémaginaire
- Distributed by: Les Films Séville
- Release date: August 25, 2021 (FFA)
- Running time: 95 minutes
- Country: Canada
- Language: French

A Revision (French: Une révision) is a Canadian drama film, directed by Catherine Therrien and released in 2021. The film stars Patrice Robitaille as Étienne Brasseur, a philosophy professor who undergoes a crisis of faith after interacting with Nacira Abdeli (Nour Belkhiria), a Muslim student who debates and challenges his values.

The film's cast also includes Rabah Aït Ouyahia, Pierre Curzi, Vincent Bellefleur, Anne-Élisabeth Bossé, Édith Cochrane, Isabelle Giroux, Michel Laperrière, Rose-Marie Perreault, Ralph Prosper and Joe Rohayem.

The film premiered at the Angoulême Francophone Film Festival in August 2021, and had its Canadian premiere on November 2, 2021, as the opening film of the Cinemania film festival.

== Awards ==
| Award | Date of ceremony | Category | Recipient(s) | Result | Ref(s) |
|---|---|---|---|---|---|
| Prix Iris | 2022 | Best Actor | Patrice Robitaille | Nominated | |
| Prix Iris | 2022 | Best Actress | Nour Belkhiria | Nominated | |
| Prix Iris | 2022 | Best Supporting Actor | Rabah Aït Ouyahia | Nominated | |
| Prix Iris | 2022 | Best Screenplay | Louis Godbout, Normand Corbeil | Nominated | |
| Prix Iris | 2022 | Public Prize | Denise Robert, Catherine Therrien, Louis Godbout, Normand Corbeil | Nominated | |
