= Delphine (2019 film) =

2019 Canadian short drama film

- Directed by: Chloé Robichaud
- Written by: Nathalie Doummar
- Based on: Delphine de Ville Saint-Laurent by Nathalie Doummar
- Produced by: Gabrielle Tougas-Fréchette; Guillaume Vasseur
- Starring: Daria Oliel-Sabbag; Ines Feghouli Bozon; Ambre Jabrane; Wiam Mohktari
- Cinematography: Ian Lagarde
- Edited by: Yvann Thibaudeau
- Release date: August 29, 2019 (Venice)
- Running time: 13 minutes
- Country: Canada
- Language: French

Delphine is a Canadian short drama film, directed by Chloé Robichaud and released in 2019. The film centres on Delphine, a young Lebanese Canadian girl who is bullied at her school for being ethnically different, and Nicole, one of her only classmates who sympathizes with her instead of participating.

The film stars Daria Oliel-Sabbag as Delphine and Ines Feghouli Bozon as Nicole in childhood, and Ambre Jabrane as Delphine and Wiam Mohktari as Nicole in their teenage years. The film was written by Nathalie Doummar as an adaptation of her own theatrical short play Delphine de Ville Saint-Laurent.

The film premiered at the 76th Venice International Film Festival in the Horizons stream. It was subsequently screened at the 2019 Toronto International Film Festival, where it won the award for Best Canadian Short Film. In December 2019, the film was named to TIFF's annual year-end Canada's Top Ten list for short films.
