= Donald Lavoie =

Canadian hit man

Donald Lavoie (born 21 May 1942) is a self-proclaimed former hit man for the Dubois Gang, situated in Montreal, Quebec, Canada. During his career as a hit man, Lavoie assassinated at least 15 people, to which he later confessed. Lavoie's testimony was used by the Montreal Police Force to convict members of the Dubois Gang. Until his testimony, the Dubois Gang had been nearly impossible to infiltrate.

== Early childhood ==
Donald Lavoie was born in Chicoutimi, Quebec, Canada, and was one of three children. At a young age, his parents surrendered him and his siblings to a local orphanage. The parents´ reasons for handing their children into care is unclear. Lavoie claims he was a smart, young man who received good grades as a student in high school. As a teenager he committed various crimes, such as breaking and entering or robbing convenience stores.

== Hit man ==
Lavoie moved to Montreal and soon after came in contact with the Dubois brothers, also known as the Dubois Gang. After his infiltration into the gang, he became an important member and was known as the Gang's top hit man. During Lavoie's career as a hit man, he admitted to killing at least fifteen people with a gun (the exact number is unknown). Lavoie testified to 27 murders committed by the Dubois Gang. Lavoie dedicated ten to twelve years of his life to the Dubois Gang.

== Informant ==
Lavoie's career came to an end when he overheard a conversation between Claude Dubois and another gang member planning to shoot him. He was able to hide safely from the other gang members, by sliding down a laundry chute and waiting patiently. Lavoie now needed police protection and decided to testify against the Dubois Gang.

When Lavoie agreed to testify against Claude Dubois in 1982, it resulted in Claude Dubois serving a life sentence for murder charges. Lavoie also testified, as the key witness, against Adrien Dubois. In the testimony, Lavoie claimed he drove Adrien Dubois to a location to murder someone. Lavoie was not convicted of any murder charges he admitted to (but did serve some time in a penitentiary), and was placed in the Witness Protection Program. The testimony of Donald Lavoie was crucial to bringing the Dubois Gang down, and the gang was dissolved after that. Along with the murders Lavoie committed himself, he was also able to give insight on many other murders and other criminal acts.

== Life after crime ==
After serving his time, Lavoie now lives in Laurentian, Quebec, Canada.

He is the subject of the 2023 film Dusk for a Hitman (Crépuscule pour un tueur), in which he is portrayed by Éric Bruneau.
