= Dusk for a Hitman =

2023 Canadian drama film

- French: Crépuscule pour un tueur
- Directed by: Raymond St-Jean
- Written by: Martin Girard; Raymond St-Jean
- Produced by: Paul Cadieux; Louis Laverdière; Michel Ouellette
- Starring: Éric Bruneau; Benoît Gouin; Sylvain Marcel; Rose-Marie Perreault
- Cinematography: Jean-François Lord
- Edited by: Philippe Ralet
- Music by: Gaëtan Gravel
- Production company: Les Productions Megafun
- Distributed by: Filmoption International
- Release date: February 28, 2023 (RVQC)
- Running time: 105 minutes
- Country: Canada
- Language: French

Dusk for a Hitman (French: Crépuscule pour un tueur) is a Canadian crime drama film, directed by Raymond St-Jean and released in 2023. The film stars Éric Bruneau as Donald Lavoie, a hitman for the Dubois brothers crime gang, as he begins to come under pressure from detective Patrick Burns (Sylvain Marcel) to testify against his bosses in a police investigation, while simultaneously being asked to prove his loyalty to his boss Claude Dubois (Benoît Gouin) following a botched double murder.

The cast also includes Rose-Marie Perreault as Francine Lavoie, as well as Alexandra Petrachuk, Paul Zinno, Judith Baribeau, Gabrielle Anne Desy, Charles-Aubey Houde, Joakim Robillard, Benoît Brière, Charlotte Poitras, Alexandre Castonguay, Sylvain Massé, Jean Petitclerc, Agathe Ledoux and Melissa Plante in supporting roles.

The film premiered on February 28, 2023, at the Rendez-vous Québec Cinéma, in advance of its commercial release on March 10.

Dusk for a Hitman was released in the United States on April 19, 2024 to positive reviews, getting a 90% average score on Rotten Tomatoes.
