= No Trace (2021 film) =

Canadian drama film

- French: Nulle trace
- Directed by: Simon Lavoie
- Written by: Simon Lavoie
- Produced by: Marcel Giroux
- Starring: Nathalie Doummar; Monique Gosselin
- Cinematography: Simran Dewan
- Edited by: Mathieu Bouchard-Malo
- Music by: Gabriel Dufour-Laperrière
- Production company: GPA Films
- Distributed by: K Films Amérique
- Release date: February 12, 2021 (Slamdance)
- Running time: 105 minutes
- Country: Canada
- Language: French

No Trace (French: Nulle trace) is a Canadian drama film, directed by Simon Lavoie and released in 2021. An exploration of the conflict between rationality and faith, the film centres on N (Monique Gosselin), a cynical smuggler who is escorting Awa (Nathalie Doummar), a devoutly religious woman, to their country's border after an unspecified event has threatened Awa's safety.

The film had been slated to premiere at the 2020 Festival du nouveau cinéma, but was cancelled when the festival shifted from in-person to online screening due to the COVID-19 pandemic in Quebec.

It premiered at the 2021 Slamdance Film Festival, where it won a Grand Jury Prize in the Breakouts category. It had its Canadian premiere at the Rendez-vous Québec Cinéma, before opening commercially in May.
