= Antigone (2019 film) =

Canadian drama film

- Theatrical release poster
- Directed by: Sophie Deraspe
- Screenplay by: Sophie Deraspe
- Based on: Antigone by Sophocles
- Produced by: Marc Daigle
- Starring: Nahéma Ricci; Rawad El-Zein; Hakim Brahimi; Rachida Oussaada; Nour Belkhiria
- Cinematography: Sophie Deraspe
- Edited by: Geoffrey Boulangé; Sophie Deraspe
- Music by: Jad Orphée Chami; Jean Massicotte
- Production company: ACPAV
- Distributed by: Maison 4:3
- Release dates: 9 September 2019 (TIFF); 8 November 2019 (Quebec)
- Running time: 109 minutes
- Country: Canada
- Languages: French; Arabic

Antigone is a 2019 Canadian drama film directed by Sophie Deraspe. An adaptation of the ancient Greek play Antigone by Sophocles, the film transposes the story to a modern-day refugee family in Montreal. The cast includes Nahéma Ricci as Antigone, with Rawad El-Zein, Hakim Brahimi, Rachida Oussaada, and Nour Belkhiria. It was filmed in Greater Montreal in 2018.

The film premiered at the 2019 Toronto International Film Festival and received positive reviews. It won the Toronto International Film Festival Award for Best Canadian Film.

Antigone won five Canadian Screen Awards, including Best Motion Picture, at the 8th Canadian Screen Awards in 2020. It was also selected as the Canadian entry for Best International Feature Film at the 92nd Academy Awards, but was not nominated.

== Plot ==
In Quebec, the Hipponomes are a family of refugees from Kabylia, headed by grandmother Méni. Méni's grandchildren are Étéocle, Polynice, Ismène and Antigone; whose parents were killed before the family left their village. While Antigone achieves straight As in high school, Polynice descends into a life of crime with the street gang, the Habibis. One day, Polynice and Étéocle are playing jacks with friends when the police show up; Étéocle is shot and killed and Polynice is arrested for assaulting an officer in the aftermath. Through Antigone's friend Hémon, the Hipponomes meet Hémon's father Christian, a local politician. Christian tells them that with Polynice's criminal record and lack of citizenship, he will likely be deported. Antigone, concerned Polynice will never survive in their home country, decides to plot a prison escape. She reasons as a minor, she will escape jail time and pressures Ismène, an aspiring hairdresser, to cut her hair. Now resembling Polynice, Antigone visits the jail with Méni. There, Antigone and Polynice quickly trade clothes, and Polynice leaves with Méni while Antigone goes to Polynice's jail cell.

The prison officials discover the ploy; Antigone is arrested for aiding an escape and transferred to a women's prison. Méni is also arrested for aiding in the escape, to Antigone's horror. A police officer tells Antigone that Étéocle was also a member of the Habibis. Antigone intends to plead guilty, but the judge questions her understanding of the gravity of the situation and assigns her legal aid, with a lawyer named O'Neil. O'Neil warns Antigone about the dangers of a criminal record and shows her the debate on social media, where users are questioning if Antigone herself is a Habibi. Antigone is upset and asserts she is only motivated by family loyalty, accepting O'Neil's representation. Hémon quits school to organize rallies in support of Antigone; supporters pack the courtroom and disrupt the proceedings with cellphone ringtones (identical to Hémon's ringtone), and Antigone professes her heart's desire to help her brother.

After Méni is bailed out of jail, Antigone's words about her heart go viral. Buoyed by the support, O'Neil asks the judge for a suspended sentence; however, the prosecutor calls an unexpected witness, Polynice. Polynice was arrested the previous night at a bar. Antigone becomes hysterical, questioning her brother why he risked what the family had sacrificed for, and disparaging the ceremonies of the court. The judge tells Antigone she is risking her chance at Canadian citizenship. Christian takes Antigone away from jail and offers to serve as her guardian, as Méni has decided to go back to her village with Polynice. Ismène is unwilling to go with them, still desiring a loan to start her own salon. Antigone and Hémon have sex. Later, Antigone, Méni and Polynice go to the airport, passing a young refugee family resembling themselves when they arrived. Antigone hears Hémon's ringtone and turns around.

== Cast ==
Cast and characters of Antigone
Actor	Character	Sophocles' analogue
Nahéma Ricci	Antigone Hipponome	Antigone
Rawad El-Zein	Polynice Hipponome	Polynices
Hakim Brahimi	Étéocle Hipponome	Eteocles
Rachida Oussaada	Méni Hipponome	Menoeceus
Nour Belkhiria	Ismène Hipponome	Ismene
Antoine Desrochers	Hémon	Haimon
Paul Doucet	Christian	Creon
Jean-Sébastien Courchesne	O'Neil	

== Production ==
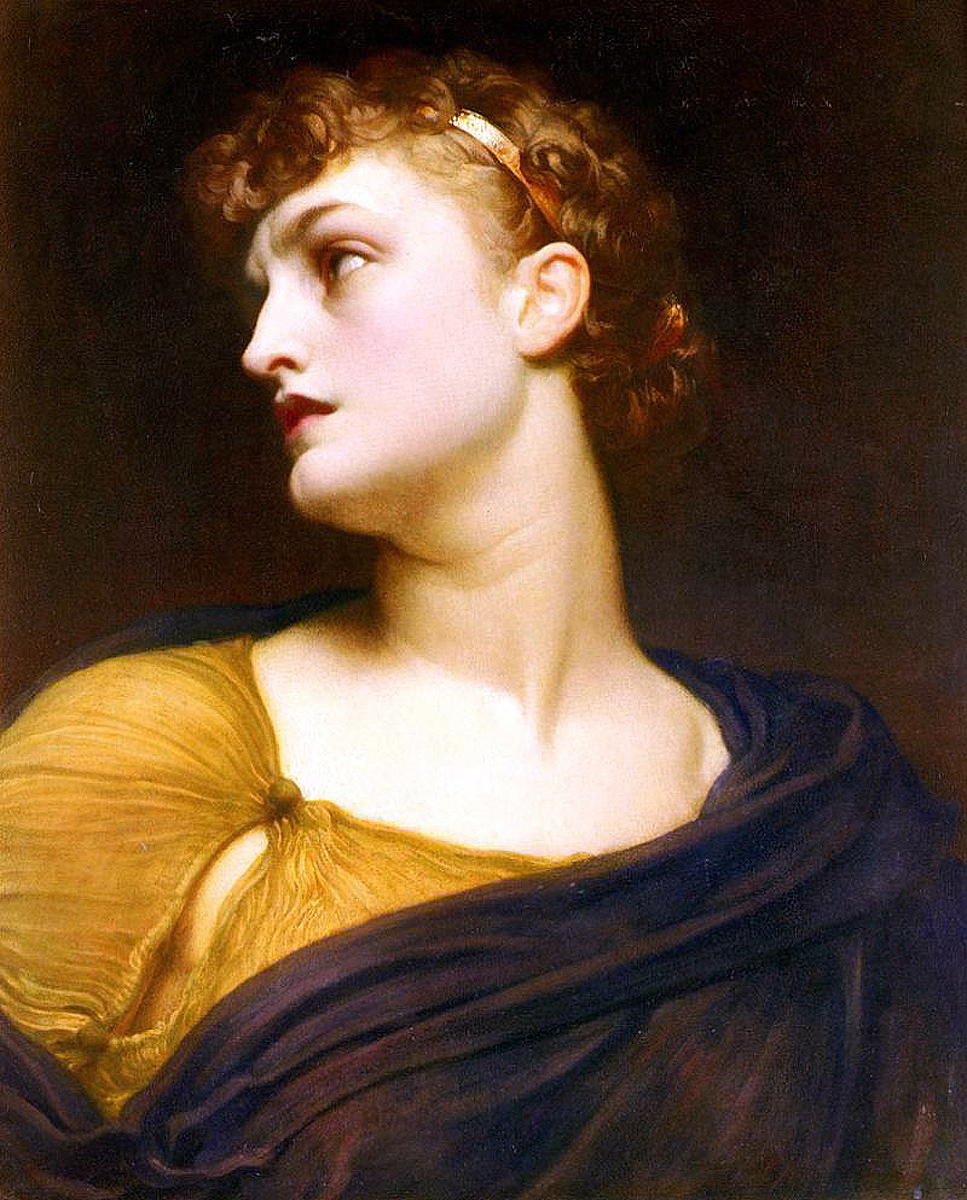
Antigone by Frederic Leighton; the myth inspired the story.

An inspiration for the story was the 2008 death of Fredy Villanueva in Montreal, and an interview with Villanueva's sister director Sophie Deraspe heard. Deraspe announced work on Antigone in 2016, when she was seeking funding. She explained her decision to adapt the play by Sophocles, saying the story of a woman who defies the law for something greater resonated with her, and she wished to update it (moving it to Montreal). In May 2018 Telefilm Canada announced it would spend approximately $13 million to fund 10 Quebec films, including Antigone. In December, it was awarded half of $380,000 funding from the Quebecor Fund for its Event and Film Production Assistance Program, with the other half going to another project, Mafia Inc. by Daniel Grou.

Nahéma Ricci said she won the title role after participating in a long series of auditions to fill all the film's roles. Deraspe particularly looked for novice actors in the process. With 850 people looking to audition, 300 auditioned over a period of three weeks. The process also served to cast the Greek chorus, appearing on the streets and the Internet.

Principal photography was scheduled for 5 May to 17 June 2018. Filming took place in Greater Montreal. Deraspe played piano for the film score.

== Release ==
The film premiered at the 2019 Toronto International Film Festival, and went to theatrical release in November 2019. At TIFF, it won the festival's award for Best Canadian Film.

On 20 September the film screened at Lido Cinema in Rimouski, Quebec to be eligible for consideration for the Academy Award for Best International Feature Film.

== Reception ==
=== Critical response ===
On the review aggregator website Rotten Tomatoes, 96% of 27 critics' reviews are positive, with an average rating of 7.8/10.

For Now, Kelsey Adams called Antigone "heartbreaking" and "an incisive critique of the power imbalance between citizens and immigrants". In La Presse, Marc-André Lussier praised Nahéma Ricci's acting. Montreal Gazette writer Angelo Muredda compared the film's Antigone character to Joan of Arc, adding Ricci, in a "steely, star-making performance", somewhat resembles Maria Falconetti in The Passion of Joan of Arc (1928). Muredda also found parallels between the story and March for Our Lives and Black Lives Matter. Cult MTL's review calls Antigone "sometimes powerful", but criticized what it called a "clumsy translation" of the ancient story to modern Quebec. For Screen Daily, Allan Hunter called the film a "meaty, thought-provoking drama" and Ricci's performance "gutsy, committed", though suggesting she looked too old for her part. Peter Howell of the Toronto Star called it one of the year's best films, praising Ricci's performance in particular. Writing for Variety, Jessica Kiang positively commented the film endeavoured to capture the spirit of Sophocles' play rather than the letter, adding it was "further electrified" by Ricci. The Globe and Mail's Justine Smith noted Sophocles' play had previously been re-imagined to make statements on fascism, the counterculture movement and other subjects.

=== Accolades ===
In addition to winning Best Canadian Film at TIFF, Ricci was named one of the year's "Rising Stars". Antigone was also selected as the Canadian entry for Best International Feature Film at the 92nd Academy Awards, but was not nominated.

On 8 December 2019, the film was named by the Toronto Film Critics Association as a finalist for the Rogers Best Canadian Film Award. On 11 December, the film was named to TIFF's annual year-end Canada's Top Ten list.

Award	Date of ceremony	Category	Recipient(s)	Result	Ref(s)
Canadian Screen Awards	28 May 2020	Best Motion Picture	Marc Daigle	Won	
Canadian Screen Awards	28 May 2020	Best Director	Sophie Deraspe	Nominated	
Canadian Screen Awards	28 May 2020	Best Adapted Screenplay	Sophie Deraspe	Won	
Canadian Screen Awards	28 May 2020	Best Actress	Nahéma Ricci	Won	
Canadian Screen Awards	28 May 2020	Best Supporting Actress	Nour Belkhiria	Won	
Canadian Screen Awards	28 May 2020	Best Editing	Sophie Deraspe and Geoffrey Boulangé	Won	
Canadian Screen Awards	28 May 2020	Best Overall Sound	Stéphane Bergeron	Nominated	
Palm Springs International Film Festival	2–13 January 2020	FIPRESCI Prize for International Screenplay Special Mention	Sophie Deraspe	Won	
Prix collégial du cinéma québécois	2020	Best Film	Antigone	Won	
Prix Iris	10 June 2020	Best Film	Marc Daigle	Won	
Prix Iris	10 June 2020	Best Director	Sophie Deraspe	Won	
Prix Iris	10 June 2020	Best Screenplay	Sophie Deraspe	Won	
Prix Iris	10 June 2020	Revelation of the Year	Nahéma Ricci	Won	
Prix Iris	10 June 2020	Best Casting	Sophie Deraspe, Isabelle Couture, Pierre Pageau, Daniel Poisson	Won	
Prix Iris	10 June 2020	Best Editing	Geoffrey Boulangé, Sophie Deraspe	Won	
Prix Iris	10 June 2020	Best Original Music	Jean Massicotte, Jad Orphée Chami	Nominated	
Prix Iris	10 June 2020	Most Successful Film Outside Quebec	Sophie Deraspe, Marc Daigle	Nominated	
Toronto International Film Festival	5–15 September 2019	Best Canadian Film	Sophie Deraspe	Won	
Toronto Film Critics Association	8 December 2019	Best Canadian Film	Sophie Deraspe	Runner-up	

== See also ==
- List of submissions to the 92nd Academy Awards for Best International Feature Film
- List of Canadian submissions for the Academy Award for Best International Feature Film
