= Ramachandra Borcar =

- Also known as: Ram, DJ Ram, Ramasutra
- Born: Montreal, Quebec, Canada
- Occupation(s): Composer, screen composer, musician
- Instrument(s): drums, percussion

Ramachandra Borcar is a Montreal-born musician and composer of mixed Indian and Danish background. He is also known under the monikers Ramasutra and DJ Ram.

His extensive musical career includes work as a film composer, arranger, orchestrator, performer, studio producer and ethnomusicologist. After studying classical composition, orchestration and electro-acoustic music at McGill University, he went on to create scores for film, television, documentaries, commercials and the theatre.

== Film composer ==
Borcar has composed for over 100 television episodes, 30+ film, documentary and animated short scores and a AAA video game soundtrack (Far Cry 4). Among the few contemporary polystylistic composers, Borcar's portfolio of work includes an astonishing range of musical styles and expressions.

Film, TV & documentary projects include, among others, Soft Shell Man (Un crabe dans la tete) (2001), for which he won a Jutra Award in 2002, Happy Camper (Camping sauvage) (2004), Louise Archambault's debut feature film Familia (2005), Bombay Calling (2005), Karsh Is History (2009) - for which he was nominated for a Gemini Award, and Patrick Demers' critically acclaimed debut Suspicions (Jaloux, 2011), for which he earned a Genie Award nomination. He also composed the opening theme music for Nicolas Roeg's Puffball (2008). His television work includes the ten-part series Web Dreams, themes for Tout le monde en parle, Casting, Women Warriors, Comme Par Magie - for which he was nominated for a Prix Gémaux award - and commercials for Mercedes-Benz, Toyota and Cadbury.

In 2011, Borcar composed film scores for Goon, directed by Michael Dowse and starring Liev Schreiber, Marc-André Grondin, Jay Baruchel, Seann William Scott and Alison Pill; the Belgian-Quebec co-production Un nuage dans un verre d'eau directed by Srinath Samarasinghe and starring Anamaria Marinca, and "The American Tiger" - a David Suzuki The Nature of Things documentary. He also scored the music for the NFB's animated short Paula, by Dominic-Étienne Simard, which won "Best Animated Short" at the Canadian Screen Awards and earned Borcar the "Award for Music in Film" at the Animatòr Film Festival.

In 2012, Borcar composed the original music for the trailer of Martin Villeneuve's science fiction film Mars et Avril; wrote the music for the NFB's ambitious interactive site Here At Home; completed the full score for orchestra for Manon Briand's feature-film Liverpool. He also composed the original score for Yan Lanouette Turgeon's debut feature film Rock Paper Scissors (Roche papier ciseaux), which earned him the Jutra Award for "Best Original Score" as well as a Canadian Screen Award nomination.

In 2013, Borcar wrote the original music for Nickelodeon's TV feature Nicky Deuce - starring James Gandolfini, Tony Sirico, Michael Imperioli, Vincent Curatola, Rita Moreno and Steve Schirripa (writer and director). He completed the full score for orchestra of Stefan Miljevic's Amsterdam; the full score for Jean-Sebastien Lord's L'Ange Gardien, starring Guy Nadon, Marilyn Castonguay and Patrick Hivon, and the original music for Bruce La Bruce's Gerontophilia starring Walter Borden, Pier-Gabriel Lajoie and Katie Boland.

In 2014, Borcar completed the score for Je suis à toi, the second film by Belgian director David Lambert. The film premiered at Karlovy Vary where it won the best actor award for Nahuel Perez Biscayart's lead role. The film also co-starred Canadian actress Monia Chokri.

In 2014, he completed the score for the feature documentary The Price We Pay, from director Harold Crooks (The Corporation, Surviving Progress). The film premiered at the 2014 Toronto International Film Festival. Borcar was also a musical contributor to Ubisoft's Far Cry 4, composing the original music for several parts of the open-world video-game. FC4's main composer was Cliff Martinez (Drive, Only God Forgives). Borcar's original game soundtrack Far Cry 4 Lakshmana Edition was released by Ubisoft in May 2015.

In 2016, Borcar completed the score for David Lynch: Shadows of Paradise a documentary film by Sebastian Lange exploring David Lynch's role as the spokesperson for the Transcendental Meditation movement, founded by the Maharishi. Borcar also scored the hugely successful television series L'Imposteur (The Imposter) starring Marc-André Grondin and directed by Yan Lanouette Turgeon, which has been renewed for a second season. Borcar's original music for the series earned him two awards at the 2017 Gémeaux Awards.

== Recording artist and performer ==
Under the name Ramasutra, he released his self-produced debut album The East Infection in 1999 for which he won a Félix Award in 2000 (amongst three nominations including "Best Arranger"), two Mimi Awards for "Album of the Year" and "Best Live Show", and a Juno Award nomination for "Best Alternative Album". He followed it up with El Pipo Del Taxi in 2003 that won him a Mimi award for "Best Producer".

Under his full name and on his own label, Semprini Records, he released the score for the award-winning documentary by Joseph Hillel and Patrick Demers entitled Regular or Super (2004), as "Steel and Glass". Borcar performed the album live at the 2005 Montreal International Jazz Festival, with over 20 of the city's renowned jazz musicians, all of whom performed on the original soundtrack recording.

== Producer ==
Borcar's production work includes not only his personal albums and soundtracks but other artists as well. In 2005 he produced debut albums for the Brazilian funk band Gaia, the indo-jazz outfit Catherine Potter's Duniya Project, Bulgarian gypsy band Kaba Horo and the Montreal tex-mex electro duo Call Me Poupee and Voivod.

In 2006, Borcar co-founded the Signed by Force record label, which was active until 2010, during which time they released albums by a number of artists including: Bionic, Nutsak, Trigger Effect, Starvin Hungry and Devil Eyes.

== Awards and nominations ==
- 2022 IDA Award "Best Original Score" (The Melt Goes On Forever: The Art and Times of David Hammons)
- 2020 Islantilla Cinefórum Film Festival nomination "Best Original Score" (The Far Shore)
- 2017 Gémeaux Award for "Best Original Music in a Series (fiction)" (L'Imposteur)
- 2017 Gémeaux Award for "Best Original Theme - All Categories" (L'Imposteur)
- 2014 Jutra Award for "Best Original Score" (Roche Papier Ciseaux)
- 2014 Canadian Screen Awards nomination for "Best Original Score" (Roche Papier Ciseaux)
- 2013 Animatòr Festival "Award for Music in Film" (Paula)
- 2012 Genie Award nomination for "Best Original Score" (Jaloux)
- 2010 Gemini Award nomination for "Best Original Score" (Karsh Is History)
- 2010 Prix Gémeaux nomination for "Best Original Theme" (Comme Par Magie)
- 2007 Juno Award for Kaba Horo "Best World Music Album" (Album Production)
- 2003 Mimi Award for "Best Producer" (El Pipo Del Taxi)
- 2002 Jutra Award for "Best Original Film Score" (J'ai Un Crabe Dans La Tete)
- 2001 Mimi Award for "Best Live Show"
- 2000 Juno Award nomination for "Best Alternative Album" (The East Infection)
- 2000 Felix Award (amongst three nominations) for "Best Urban Album" (The East Infection)
- 2000 Mimi Award for "Best Album" (The East Infection)

== Discography ==
=== Performer, composer & arranger ===
| Artist | Title | Year | Label |
|---|---|---|---|
| Ramasutra | The East Infection | 1999 | Tox |
| Ramasutra | El Pipo Del Taxi EP | 2003 | Semprini Records |
| Ramachandra Borcar | Camping Sauvage (Original Soundtrack) | 2004 | Canusa |
| Ramachandra Borcar | Steel And Glass (Original Soundtrack) | 2005 | Semprini Records |
| Ramachandra Borcar | Jaloux (Original Soundtrack) | 2011 | Semprini Records |
| Ramachandra Borcar | Roche papier ciseaux (Original Soundtrack) | 2013 | Semprini Records |
| Ramachandra Borcar | L'Ange gardien (Original Soundtrack) | 2014 | Semprini Records |
| Ramachandra Borcar | Far Cry 4 Lakshmana Edition (Original Game Soundtrack) | 2015 | Ubisoft Music |

=== Producer ===
| Artist | Title | Contribution | Year | Label |
|---|---|---|---|---|
| Catherine Potter | Duniya Project | Producer | 2005 | SHADAJ |
| Gaïa | Gaïa | Producer | 2005 | JAJOU PRODUCTIONS |
| Lubo Alexandrov | Kaba Horo | Producer | 2005 | ENJA |
| Call Me Poupée | Western Shanghai | Producer | 2006 | Semprini Records |
