= Patrick Demers =

Canadian film director

Patrick Demers is a film director from Montreal, born in 1969 in Saint-Eustache, Quebec.

== Biography ==
Following his graduation from film school at the age of 22, Demers traveled around the world alone over six months with a handheld camera for La Course destination monde (Radio-Canada Television) and started shooting.

After a few years working as a director in the television and advertising industries, his first short fiction film, Discharge (Décharge), won the award for Best Canadian Short Film at the Toronto International Film Festival. In 2003 he wrote and directed "Dans un spoutnik", an animated music video for Daniel Bélanger which won several awards in the ADISQ Gala and at the MuchMusic Video Awards that year. His next documentary, Regular or Super: Views on Mies van der Rohe, that he co-directed and edited, won Best Canadian Work at the Festival International du Film sur l'Art en 2004.

Suspicions (Jaloux), his first feature film, was released in 2010. The independent movie was produced by Productions Kinesis and was selected by the Karlovy Vary International Film Festival and by the Toronto International Film Festival while also opening the Canadian Front at the Museum of Modern Art in 2011. Origami (2017) premiered at the Fantasia International Film Festival where it won the Barry Convex Special Jury Prize for its deft direction, sophisticated visual aesthetic, strong performances, and the successful blending of genres in a complex story told in a refreshingly unconventional manner.

== Filmography ==
=== Shorts ===
- 1987 - Ma dernière cigarette
- 1988 - Le refus
- 1989 — Brand New Flambant Neuf
- 1990 - monsieurmadamechose
- 1991 - Lamenta
- 1999 - Discharge (Décharge)
- 2004 - Le Collet

=== Animation ===
- 2003 - "Dans un spoutnik" (music video for Daniel Bélanger)
- 2005 - "Heureux d'un printemps"

=== Documentary ===
- 2004 Regular or Super: Views on Mies van der Rohe

=== Feature films ===
- 2010 - Suspicions (Jaloux)
- 2017 - Origami
