= My Daughter, My Angel =

- Directed by: Alexis Durand-Brault
- Written by: Pierre Szalowski
- Produced by: Richard Lalonde; Maxime Rémillard
- Starring: Michel Côté; Karine Vanasse
- Cinematography: Yves Bélanger
- Edited by: Richard Comeau
- Music by: Normand Corbeil
- Distributed by: Alliance Atlantis Communications
- Release date: February 16, 2007
- Running time: 85 minutes
- Country: Canada
- Language: French
- Box office: $2,780,005

My Daughter, My Angel (French: Ma fille, mon ange) is a 2007 Canadian French language thriller film, directed by Alexis Durand-Brault and starring Michel Côté and Karine Vanasse.

== Plot ==
Germain Dagenais, a former solicitor (Côté), discovers evidence from a crime scene which included a dead body, of a videotape that included pornography. He is interested in viewing porn during his private time and accidentally finds his own daughter Nathalie (Karine Vanasse) in a video announcing she will be in a future video. Panicked, Germain must find his daughter and save her before she meets the same fate.

== Awards ==
- Genie Award for Best Performance by an Actress in a Supporting Role - Laurence Leboeuf - Nominee
