= Pointe-du-Lac =

Borough of Trois-Rivières, Quebec, Canada

Coordinates: 46°17′N 072°41′W

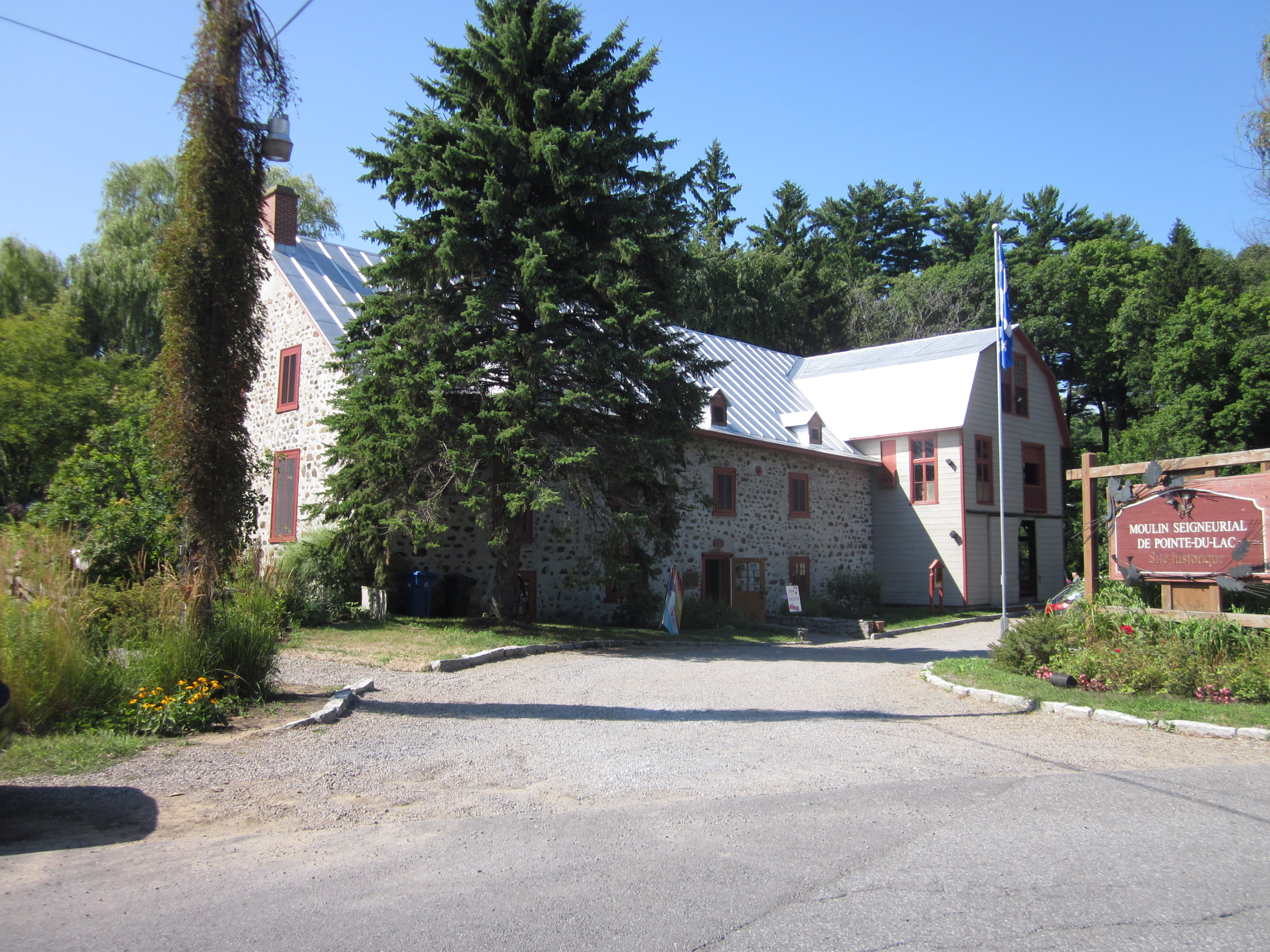
The seigneurial mill of Tonnancour in Trois-Rivières.

Pointe-du-Lac (French pronunciation: [pwɛ̃t dy lak]) is one of the six boroughs of the city of Trois-Rivières and a former municipality in Quebec, Canada on the St. Lawrence River. It was founded in 1738 and its current church dates from 1882. Another old building in the village is the Moulin Seigneurial built in 1765, one of the last watermills still in existence in Canada.

The municipality was amalgamated into the City of Trois-Rivières in 2002. Population (2001 census) 6,902.
