= Chloé Robichaud =

Canadian director (born 1988)

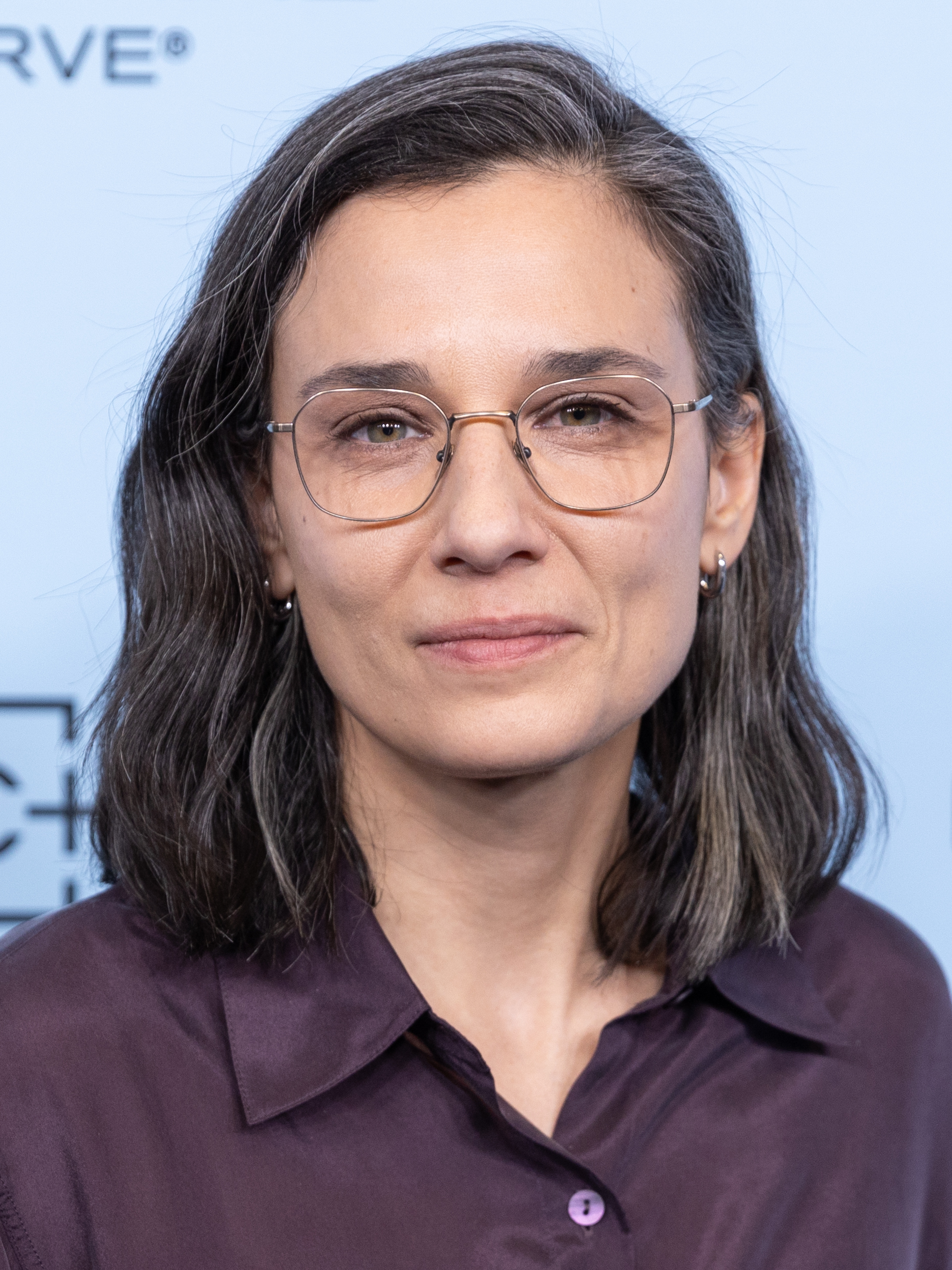
- Robichaud in 2025
- Born: January 31, 1988 (age 38); Cap-Rouge, Quebec, Canada
- Education: Mel Hoppenheim School of Cinema at Concordia University
- Notable work: Sarah Prefers to Run

Chloé Robichaud (born January 31, 1988) is a Canadian director best known for her debut film Sarah Prefers to Run. The film premiered at the 2013 Cannes Film Festival in the Un Certain Regard section.

== Early life and education ==
Robichaud was born in Cap-Rouge, Quebec. She graduated from the Mel Hoppenheim School of Cinema at Concordia University in 2010.

== Career ==
Robichaud made her feature film debut with Sarah Prefers to Run. It was screened in the Un Certain Regard section at the 2013 Cannes Film Festival.

Robichaud launched the webseries Féminin/Féminin in 2014, about a group of six Montrealer lesbians dealing with love and growing up in the city. The series ran for an initial eight episodes. In 2018, Robichaud directed a second season made up of an additional eight episodes.

In 2015, Robichaud announced her next film would be Boundaries, which presents three women whose paths cross in the fictional country of Besco, a small, isolated island facing an important economic crisis.

She is an out lesbian. In February 2022, she announced her engagement to actress and comedian Katherine Levac.

== Filmography ==
- Regardless — 2008
- Au revoir Timothy — 2009
- Moi non plus — 2010
- Nature morte — 2010
- Herd Leader (Chef de meute) — 2012
- Sarah Prefers to Run (Sarah préfère la course) — 2013
- Féminin/Féminin — 2014
- Boundaries (Pays) — 2016
- Delphine — 2019
- Days of Happiness (Les jours heureux) — 2023
- Two Women (Deux femmes en or) — 2025

== See also ==
- List of female film and television directors
- List of lesbian filmmakers
- List of LGBT-related films directed by women
