= Avec pas d'casque =

Canadian folk band

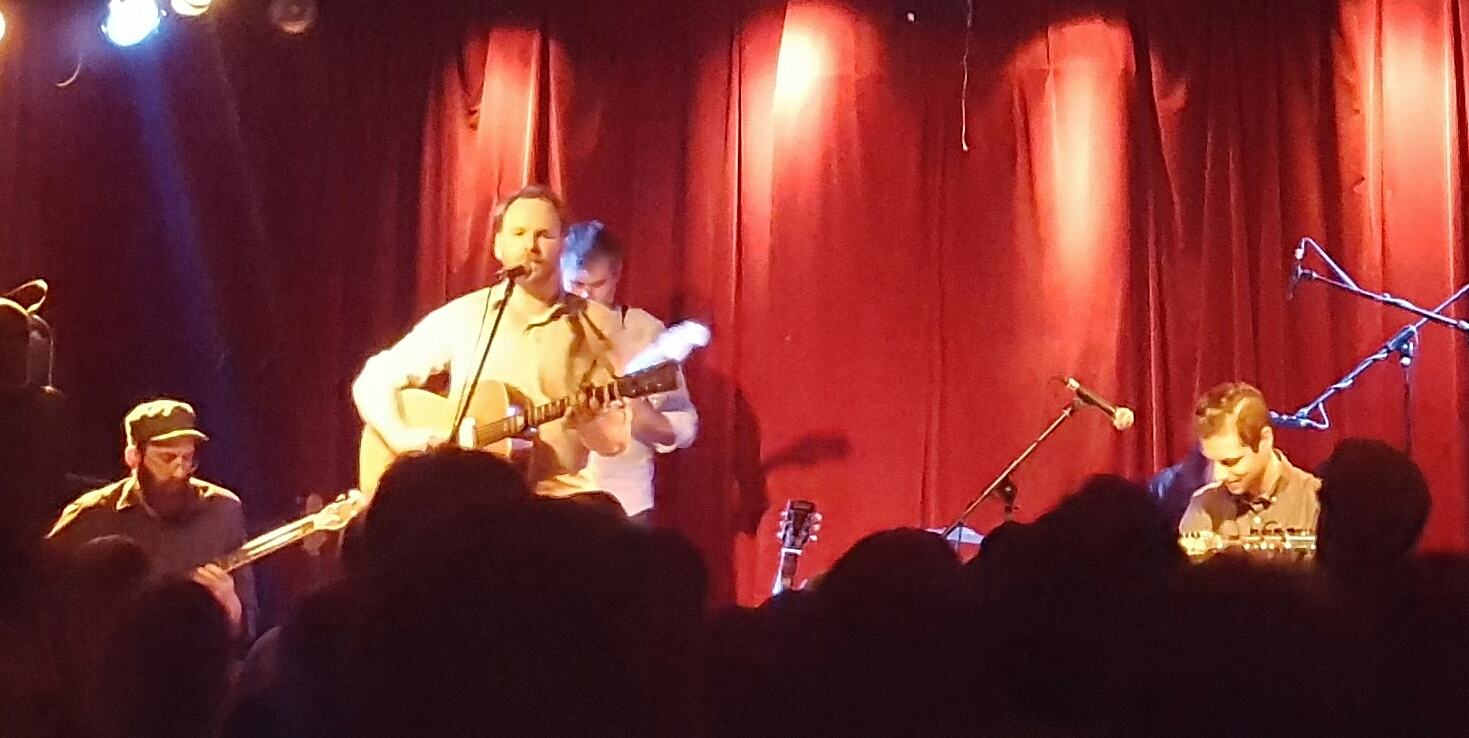
- The band in 2017

Background information
- Origin: Montreal, Quebec, Canada
- Genres: folk, lo-fi, country
- Years active: 2004–present
- Labels: Dare to Care Records; Grosse Boîte
- Members: Stéphane Lafleur; Joël Vaudreuil; Nicolas Moussette; Mathieu Charbonneau
- Website: avecpasdcasque.com

Avec pas d'casque is a folk band from Montreal, Quebec, Canada, composed of members Stéphane Lafleur, Joël Vaudreuil, Nicolas Moussette, and Mathieu Charbonneau. The band's French name literally means "with no helmet" and derives from an expression referring to hockey players who don't wear helmets, popularized by Jean Dion, a Québécois sports journalist for Le Devoir.

== History ==
Avec pas d'casque began as a duo, made up of Lafleur and Vaudreuil, who recorded a self-produced album in 2004, which they sold at their concerts. The group's first official album, Trois chaudières de sang, was released on Dare to Care Records on May 9, 2006. In 2008, after gaining a third member in Nicolas Moussette, the band released their second album, Dans la nature jusqu'au cou, on Grosse Boîte, the French division of Dare to Care. After adding a fourth member, Mathieu Charbonneau, Avec pas d'casque released their third album, Astronomie, on March 20, 2012. It was subsequently long-listed for the 2012 Polaris Music Prize, and was a Juno Award nominee for Francophone Album of the Year at the Juno Awards of 2013.

Lafleur is also a film director and screenwriter, whose films have included Continental, a Film Without Guns, You're Sleeping Nicole (Tu dors Nicole) and Viking.

Vaudreuil is an animator whose short film The River's Lazy Flow (Le courant faible de la rivière) won the Jutra Award for Best Animated Short Film at the 16th Jutra Awards in 2014, and whose full-length animated feature debut When Adam Changes (Adam change lentement) premiered in 2023. Moussette has also had credits as part of the animation team on Vaudreuil's films.

Charbonneau has also worked in film as a score composer, including the films A Colony (Une colonie), Goddess of the Fireflies (La déesse des mouches à feu) and Viking.

== Members ==
- Stéphane Lafleur: voice, guitar, ukulele, kazoo, flute, synthesizer
- Nicolas Moussette: bass, lap steel guitar
- Mathieu Charbonneau: baryton, synthesizer
- Joël Vaudreuil: drums, autoharp, kazoo

== Discography ==
- Avec pas d'casque (2004), Independent
- Trois Chaudières de Sang (2006), Dare to Care Records
- Dans La Nature Jusqu'Au Cou (2008), Grosse Boîte
- Astronomie (2012), Grosse Boîte
- Dommage Que Tu Sois Pris (2013), Grosse Boîte
- Effets Spéciaux (2016), Grosse Boîte
