= Joël Vaudreuil =

Joël Vaudreuil is a Canadian musician and animator from Quebec. He is most noted for his short film The River's Lazy Flow (Le courant faible de la rivière), which won the Jutra Award for Best Animated Short Film at the 16th Jutra Awards in 2014, and his full-length animated feature film When Adam Changes (Adam change lentement).

In addition to his film work, he has also been a drummer in the folk rock band Avec pas d'casque, whose members include his film industry colleagues Stéphane Lafleur, Mathieu Charbonneau and Nicolas Moussette, and has created animated music videos for Avec pas d'casque, Malajube, Timber Timbre and Patrick Watson.
