= Gaudette =

Gaudette is a surname. Notable people with the surname include:

- Adam Gaudette (born 1996), American ice hockey player
- André Gaudette (born 1947), Canadian ice hockey player
- Bill Gaudette (born 1981), American-born Puerto Rican footballer
- Maxim Gaudette (born 1974), Canadian actor
- Tom Gaudette (1923–1998), American businessman and community activist
