= Triptyque =

Triptyque may refer to:

- Triptyque Ardennais, road cycling race held since 1959 in Belgium
- Le Triptyque des Monts et Châteaux, road cycling race held since 1996 in Belgium
- Triptych (film) (Triptyque in French), 2013 Canadian drama film
