= Fair Sex =

- Film poster
- French: Les Manèges humains
- Directed by: Martin Laroche
- Written by: Martin Laroche
- Produced by: Martin Laroche
- Starring: Marie-Evelyne Lessard; Marc-André Brunet; Normand Daoust
- Cinematography: Félix Tétrault
- Edited by: Catherine Legault
- Music by: Thomas Hellman
- Production company: Productions Sisyphe
- Distributed by: K Films Amérique
- Release date: June 30, 2012 (Karlovy Vary)
- Running time: 98 minutes
- Country: Canada
- Language: French

Fair Sex (French: Les Manèges humains) is a Canadian drama film, directed by Martin Laroche and released in 2012.

The film stars Marie-Evelyne Lessard as Sophie, a young immigrant woman who has just graduated from film school. While working on her first film project she meets and develops a romantic interest in Frédéric (Marc-André Brunet), which brings up her own unresolved emotional trauma around having been a childhood victim of female genital mutilation. The cast also includes Normand Daoust, Stephanie Dawson, Alexandre Dubois and Michel Vézina.

The film premiered at the Karlovy Vary International Film Festival in 2012, and was screened at the Abitibi-Témiscamingue International Film Festival and the Whistler Film Festival later in the year, before going into commercial release in early 2013.

Lessard won the Borsos Competition award for Best Actress in a Canadian Film at Whistler. The film received four Jutra Award nominations at the 16th Jutra Awards, for Best Actress (Lessard), Best Supporting Actor (Daoust), Best Screenplay (Laroche) and Best Original Music (Thomas Hellman).
