= 16th Jutra Awards =

2014 Canadian film awards ceremony

The 16th Prix Jutra ceremony was held on March 23, 2014 at the Monument-National theatre in Montreal, Quebec, to honour achievements in the Cinema of Quebec in 2013. Nominations were announced in January.

Louis Cyr (Louis Cyr: L'homme le plus fort du monde) received a leading eleven nominations and swept the ceremony with eight competitive awards, including Best Film, Best Actor for Antoine Bertrand and Best Supporting Actor for Guillaume Cyr, as well as the Billet d'or award. It became the first film to win Best Film without a Best Screenplay nomination.

Gabrielle won five awards from ten nominations, including Best Screenplay and Best Director for Louise Archambault who became the second woman to win the award. The omission of Gabrielle Marion-Rivard from the Best Actress category was perceived as a snub. She eventually would win the Canadian Screen Award for Best Actress two weeks before the Jutra ceremony.

== Winners and nominees ==
Best Film	Best Director
Louis Cyr (Louis Cyr: L'homme le plus fort du monde) — Christian Larouche, Caroline Héroux, Stéphanie Héroux; Catimini — Nicolas Comeau, Nathalie Saint-Pierre; Diego Star — Pascal Bascaron, Sylvain Corbeil, Nancy Grant, Marion Hansël; The Dismantling (Le démantèlement) — Marc Daigle, Bernadette Payeur; Gabrielle — Luc Déry, Kim McCraw	Louise Archambault, Gabrielle; Denis Côté, Vic and Flo Saw a Bear (Vic+Flo ont vu un ours); Robert Lepage and Pedro Pires, Triptych (Triptyque); Sébastien Pilote, The Dismantling (Le démantèlement); Daniel Roby, Louis Cyr (Louis Cyr: L'homme le plus fort du monde)
Best Actor	Best Actress
Antoine Bertrand, Louis Cyr (Louis Cyr: L'homme le plus fort du monde); Gabriel Arcand, The Dismantling (Le démantèlement); Alexandre Landry, Gabrielle; Marcel Sabourin, Another House (L'autre maison); Isaka Sawadogo, Diego Star	Pierrette Robitaille, Vic and Flo Saw a Bear (Vic+Flo ont vu un ours); Chloé Bourgeois, Diego Star; Lise Castonguay, Triptych (Triptyque); Rose-Maïté Erkoreka, Louis Cyr (Louis Cyr: L'homme le plus fort du monde); Marie-Evelyne Lessard, Fair Sex (Les manèges humains)
Best Supporting Actor	Best Supporting Actress
Guillaume Cyr, Louis Cyr (Louis Cyr: L'homme le plus fort du monde); Normand Daoust, Fair Sex (Les manèges humains); Benoît Gouin, Gabrielle; Vincent-Guillaume Otis, Gabrielle; Gilles Renaud, The Dismantling (Le démantèlement)	Mélissa Désormeaux-Poulin, Gabrielle; Marie Brassard, Vic and Flo Saw a Bear (Vic+Flo ont vu un ours); Sophie Desmarais, The Dismantling (Le démantèlement); Muriel Dutil, Riptide (Ressac); Frédérique Paré, Catimini
Best Screenplay	Best Documentary
Louise Archambault, Gabrielle; Denis Côté, Vic and Flo Saw a Bear (Vic+Flo ont vu un ours); Martin Laroche, Fair Sex (Les manèges humains); Frédérick Pelletier, Diego Star; Nathalie Saint-Pierre, Catimini	Waiting for Spring (En attendant le printemps) — Marie-Geneviève Chabot; Frameworks: Images of a Changing World (Dans un océan d'images) — Helen Doyle; Québékoisie — Mélanie Carrier, Olivier Higgins; Silence Is Gold (Le prix des mots) — Julien Fréchette; Wavemakers (Le chant des ondes) — Caroline Martel
Best Live Action Short Film	Best Animated Short Film
An Extraordinary Person (Quelqu'un d'extraordinaire) — Monia Chokri; Gaspé Copper — Alexis Fortier Gauthier; Hurricane Boy Fuck You Tabarnak! (L'ouragan Fuck You Tabarnak!) — Ara Ball; Remember Me (Mémorable moi) — Jean-François Asselin; Time Flies (Nous avions) — Stéphane Moukarzel	The River's Lazy Flow (Le courant faible de la rivière) — Joël Vaudreuil; The Day Is Listening (Le jour nous écoute) — Félix Dufour-Laperrière; The End of Pinky (La fin de Pinky) — Claire Blanchet; Gloria Victoria — Theodore Ushev; Wandering (Errance) — Éléonore Goldberg
Best Art Direction	Best Cinematography
Michel Proulx and Marc Ricard, Louis Cyr (Louis Cyr: L'homme le plus fort du monde); Jean Babin, Christian Légaré and David Pelletier, Triptych (Triptyque); Isabelle Guay, Jean-Pierre Paquet and Réal Proulx, Upside Down; Marie-Hélène Lavoie, Hunting the Northern Godard (Chasse au Godard d'Abbittibbi); Marjorie Rhéaume, Diego Star	Michel La Veaux, The Dismantling (Le démantèlement); Steve Asselin, Another House (L'autre maison); Nicolas Bolduc, Louis Cyr (Louis Cyr: L'homme le plus fort du monde); Nathalie Moliavko-Visotzky, Catimini; André Turpin, Whitewash
Best Editing	Best Original Music
Richard Comeau, Gabrielle; Dominique Fortin, Erased; Louis-Martin Paradis, Another House (L'autre maison); Nathalie Saint-Pierre, Catimini; Arthur Tarnowski, Whitewash	Ramachandra Borcar, Rock Paper Scissors (Roche papier ciseaux); Olivier Auriol, The Legend of Sarila (La légende de Sarila); Benoît Charest, Upside Down; Michel Cusson, The Storm Within (Rouge sang); Thomas Hellman, Fair Sex (Les manèges humains)
Best Costume Design	Best Makeup
Carmen Alie, Louis Cyr (Louis Cyr: L'homme le plus fort du monde); Caroline Bodson, Hunting the Northern Godard (Chasse au Godard d'Abbittibbi); Judy Jonker, Triptych (Triptyque); Nicoletta Massone, Upside Down; Madeleine Tremblay, The Storm Within (Rouge sang)	Natalie Trépanier, Louis Cyr (Louis Cyr: L'homme le plus fort du monde); Kathryn Casault, The Four Soldiers (Les 4 soldats); Kathryn Casault, Whitewash; Maïna Militza, Hunting the Northern Godard (Chasse au Godard d'Abbittibbi); Colleen Quinton, Erased
Best Hairstyling	Best Sound
Martin Lapointe, Louis Cyr (Louis Cyr: L'homme le plus fort du monde); Réjean Goderre, When We Were Boys (Il était une fois les Boys); Manon Joly, Mirror Lake (Lac Mystère); Maïna Militza, Hunting the Northern Godard (Chasse au Godard d'Abbittibbi); Denis Parent, The Four Soldiers (Les 4 soldats)	Stéphane Bergeron, Martin Pinsonnault and Simon Poudrette, Louis Cyr (Louis Cyr: L'homme le plus fort du monde); Sylvain Bellemare, Pierre Bertrand and Bernard Gariépy Strobl, Gabrielle; Jérôme Boiteau, The Legend of Sarila (La légende de Sarila); Michel B. Bordeleau, Frédéric de Ravignan and Gavin Fernandes, Jappeloup (Jappeloup, l'étoffe d'un champion); Yann Cleary and Martin Rouillard, Hunting the Northern Godard (Chasse au Godard d'Abbittibbi)
Most Successful Film Outside Quebec	Special awards
Gabrielle — Louise Archambault; The Dismantling (Le démantèlement) — Sébastien Pilote; Inch'Allah — Anaïs Barbeau-Lavalette; Tom at the Farm (Tom à la ferme) — Xavier Dolan; Vic and Flo Saw a Bear (Vic+Flo ont vu un ours) — Denis Côté	Jutra Hommage: Micheline Lanctôt; Billet d'or: Louis Cyr (Louis Cyr: L'homme le plus fort du monde)

== Multiple wins and nominations ==
=== Films with multiple nominations ===
Nominations	Film
11	Louis Cyr (Louis Cyr: L'homme le plus fort du monde)
10	Gabrielle
7	The Dismantling (Le démantelement)
5	Catimini
5	Diego Star
5	Hunting the Northern Godard (Chasse au Godard d'Abbittibbi)
5	Vic and Flo Saw a Bear (Vic+Flo ont vu un ours)
4	Fair Sex (Les manèges humains)
4	Triptych (Tryptique)
3	Another House (L'autre maison)
3	Upside Down
3	Whitewash
2	Erased
2	The Four Soldiers (Les 4 soldats)
2	The Legend of Sarila (La légende de Sarila)
2	The Storm Within (Rouge sang)

=== Films with multiple wins ===
Wins	Film
9	Louis Cyr (Louis Cyr: L'homme le plus fort du monde)
5	Gabrielle
