= Clara Furey =

Canadian multidisciplinary artist

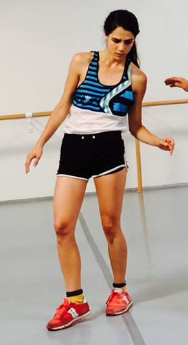
- 2015
- Born: 1983 (age 42–43)
- Education: Montreal Modern Dance Studios
- Occupations: Singer-songwriter, dancer, choreographer, actress
- Parents: Lewis Furey (father); Carole Laure (mother)
- Website: Official website

Clara Furey (born 1983) is a Canadian multidisciplinary artist: singer-songwriter, actress, dancer and choreographer.

== Biography ==
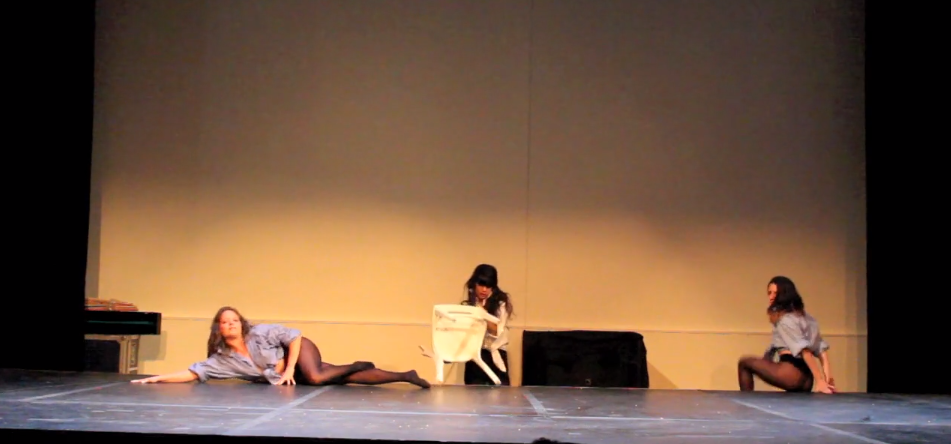
Clara Furey at Festival TransAmériques in the dance performance Justify inspired in two Madonna's songs.

Clara Furey studied classical piano, music theory, harmony and analysis at the Conservatoire de Paris. She later became interested in dance and acting and graduated from the Montreal Modern Dance Studios in 2003. As a singer-songwriter she performed a piano-voice show at the Cabaret du Saint-Sulpice in Montreal and was a singer for a Rozankovic show at the Montreal World Film Festival.

In 2004, Furey appeared in her first film role, in CQ2 (Seek You Too), directed by her mother, Carole Laure. In 2005, she went on tour with the dance company David Pressault Danse, performing in the show They will not lie down. The following year she danced in the production Lost Pigeons presented at the Studio Monument-National in Montreal and part of the show Poésies, sandwichs et autres soirs qui penchent, staged by Loui Mauffette, presented as part of the Montreal International Literary Festival.

In 2007, Furey played the lead role in the film Waitresses Wanted (Serveuses demandées), directed by Guylaine Dionne.

Furey suffered a rib injury in May 2010 during dance rehearsals for the TransAmériques Festival. Forced to rest, she concentrated on her music and in the fall of 2010 the Théâtre de Quat'Sous in Montreal provided her a three-night "carte blanche" in which she staged a performance of her songs. She cut the 15-song set in half for later concerts at Musée d'art contemporain de Montréal (MACM). During her convalescence she also took a small role in the film Sur la route.

In 2011, she participated in Initiales S.G., a tribute to Serge Gainsbourg at the Francofolies de Montréal and had a sold-out show at the Montreal Jazz Festival. She also took part in Lady & Bird's opera, Red Waters.

Furey has danced for choreographers Claude Godin, Georges Stamos, and Danielle Desnoyers. In 2013, she danced with Damien Jalet at the Musée du Louvre. In 2015, Furey and Peter Jasko staged Untied Tales (The Vanished Power of the Usual Reign). Quebec Danse described it as a provocative piece with an invisible danger urging the two performers to escape their environment.

At the end of 2016, after several collaborations, Furey became an associate artist of Par B.L.eux. The organization provided administrative and logistical support, and helped her restage Untied Tales. In 2017 Furey staged her first group work, Cosmic Love, in collaboration with her brother, composer Tomas Furey, featuring four performers in a choreographed piece with light and sound media in a stripped-down performance space.

Furey took part in the MACM's Leonard Cohen exhibition with a 90-minute silent dance piece as a meditation of passing time.

=== Personal life ===
Furey is the daughter of Lewis Furey and Carole Laure.

== Major works ==
=== Filmography ===
- Rachel in CQ2 (Seek You Too) (2003) dir. Carole Laure
- Milagro in Waitresses Wanted (Serveuses demandées) (2008) dir. Guylaine Dionne
- Nathalie in Good Neighbours (2010) dir. Jacob Tierney
- Inez in Sur la route (transl. On the Road, 2012) dir. Walter Salles
- Margot in The Forbidden Room (2015) dir. Guy Maddin

=== Dance ===
- Hello... How Are You? with Céline Bonnier (2011)
- Untied Tales (The Vanished Power of the Usual Reign) with Peter Jasko (2015)
- Cosmic Love with Tomas Furey (2017)

== See also ==
- Dance in Canada
