= Sylvie Drapeau =

Canadian actress and writer

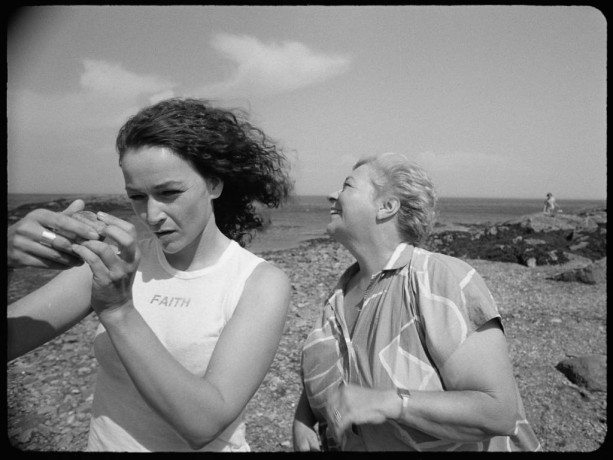
Sylvie Drapeau and France Arbour in The Three Madeleines (Les Fantômes des trois Madeleine) by Guylaine Dionne (2000)

Sylvie Drapeau (born 1962) is a Canadian actress and writer from Baie-Comeau, Quebec.

As an actress, she is most noted for her performances in The Sex of the Stars (Le Sexe des étoiles), for which she received a Genie Award nomination for Best Supporting Actress at the 14th Genie Awards; February 15, 1839 (15 février 1839), for which she won the Prix Jutra for Best Supporting Actress at the 4th Jutra Awards; and Juniper Tree (Le Piège d'Issoudun), for which she received a Prix Jutra nomination for Best Actress at the 6th Jutra Awards.

She has also appeared in the films Jesus of Montreal (Jésus de Montréal), The Sphinx (Le Sphinx), The Barbarian Invasions (Les Invasions barbares), Borderline, Nelly and Laughter (Le Rire), and the television series Jamais deux sans toi, Bouscotte, Fortier, Jean Duceppe, Nos étés and The Night Logan Woke Up (La nuit où Laurier Gaudreault s'est réveillé). She has played both English and French roles on stage.

As a writer, she published her debut novel Le Fleuve in 2015. She followed up with Le Ciel in 2017, L'Enfer in 2018 and La Terre in 2019. She received a Governor General's Award nomination for French-language fiction at the 2019 Governor General's Awards for La Terre.
