= Nathalie Saint-Pierre =

Canadian film director and screenwriter

Nathalie Saint-Pierre is a Canadian film director and screenwriter from Quebec. She is most noted for her 2012 film Catimini, for which she received Jutra Award nominations for Best Film, Best Screenplay and Best Editing at the 16th Jutra Awards in 2014.

A graduate of the business administration program at the Université du Québec à Montréal, she learned the film business by taking an administrative job with the film studio Les Films de l’autre. She directed two short films, L’Abîme appelle l’abîme (1996) and Quand j’ai eu trente ans ou comment j’ai viré su’ l’top (2001), before releasing her debut film Ma voisine danse le ska in 2003.

Catimini premiered at the 2012 Angoulême Francophone Film Festival, before opening commercially in January 2013.

Her third feature film, On Earth as in Heaven (Sur la terre comme au ciel), premiered at the 2023 Cinemania film festival.
