= Laughter (2020 film) =

2020 film

- Film poster
- French: Le Rire
- Directed by: Martin Laroche
- Written by: Martin Laroche
- Produced by: Fanny-Laure Malo
- Starring: Léane Labrèche-Dor; Alexandre Landry; Micheline Lanctôt
- Cinematography: Mathieu Laverdière
- Edited by: Amélie Labrèche
- Music by: Robert Marcel Lepage
- Production company: La Boîte à Fanny
- Distributed by: Maison 4:3
- Release date: January 21, 2020
- Running time: 124 minutes
- Country: Canada
- Language: French

Laughter (French: Le Rire) is a Canadian drama film, directed by Martin Laroche and released in 2020. The film stars Léane Labrèche-Dor as Valérie, a woman who was the sole survivor of a massacre in her hometown several years earlier in the midst of a civil war; although she has successfully rebuilt her life with a job in a long-term care home and a new romantic relationship with Gabriel (Alexandre Landry), she still struggles with survivor's guilt until the arrival of Jeanne (Micheline Lanctôt), a new patient at the home, gives her a new perspective on life.

The film's cast also includes Sylvie Drapeau, Christine Beaulieu, Catherine Proulx-Lemay, Jean-Sébastien Courchesne, Évelyne Rompré and Évelyne de la Chenelière.

The film premiered in theatres on January 31, 2020. On April 7, with virtually all film distribution in Canada suspended due to the COVID-19 pandemic in Canada, the film was made available for free internet streaming as a special one-day promotion by its distributor, Maison 4:3.

== Critical response ==
For Le Devoir, Jérôme Delgado praised Labrèche-Dor's performance, but wrote that the film overall was riddled with plot holes, most notably the fact that the film's physical and social setting showed virtually no traces of actually having been torn apart by war. André Duchesne offered a similar assessment for La Presse, criticizing the lack of any significant information in the film about an event that would have been far more traumatic to society than was evident in the screenplay. He also noted that a key scene in the film, a soliloquy by the long-term care centre's human resources director, was so similar to a scene in Denys Arcand's 2003 film The Barbarian Invasions (Les Invasions barbares) that he hoped, but did not know for sure, that the scene was intended as a deliberate homage.

== Accolades ==
The film received two Prix Iris nominations at the 22nd Quebec Cinema Awards:

Award	Date of ceremony	Category	Recipient(s) and nominee(s)	Result	Ref(s)
Prix Iris	2020	Best Actress	Léane Labrèche-Dor	Nominated	
Prix Iris	2020	Best Supporting Actress	Micheline Lanctôt	Nominated	
Canadian Cinema Editors	June 3, 2021	Best Editing in a Feature Film	Amélie Labrèche	Won	
