= Monsieur Lazhar =

2011 film

- Film poster
- Directed by: Philippe Falardeau
- Screenplay by: Philippe Falardeau
- Story by: Évelyne de la Chenelière
- Based on: Bashir Lazhar by Évelyne de la Chenelière
- Produced by: Luc Déry; Kim McCraw
- Starring: Mohamed Fellag; Sophie Nélisse; Émilien Néron; Danielle Proulx; Brigitte Poupart; Jules Philip
- Cinematography: Ronald Plante
- Edited by: Stéphane Lafleur
- Music by: Martin Léon
- Production company: micro_scope
- Distributed by: Les Films Christal; Les Films Séville
- Release dates: 8 August 2011 (Locarno); 11 September 2011 (TIFF)
- Running time: 94 minutes
- Country: Canada
- Languages: French; Arabic
- Box office: $9.1 million

Monsieur Lazhar is a 2011 Canadian French-language drama film directed by Philippe Falardeau and starring Mohamed Saïd Fellag, Sophie Nélisse and Danielle Proulx. Based on Bashir Lazhar, a one-character play by Évelyne de la Chenelière, it tells the story of an Algerian refugee in Montreal who steps in to teach at an elementary school after the former full-time teacher dies by suicide.

Falardeau opted to film the story for the Canadian company micro_scope, despite the challenges of adapting a play with only one character. De la Cheneliere advised Falardeau and recommended casting Algerian comedian Fellag. It was filmed in Montreal.

After premiering at the Locarno International Film Festival, where it won the Audience Award and the Variety Piazza Grande Award, it received critical acclaim. The film was subsequently nominated for Best Foreign Language Film at the 84th Academy Awards, and also won six Genie Awards, including Best Motion Picture.

== Plot ==
In Montreal, an elementary school teacher hangs herself. Bachir Lazhar, a recent Algerian immigrant, then offers his services to replace her, claiming to have taught in his home country. Desperate to fill the position, the principal, Mme Vaillancourt, takes him at his word and gives him the job. He gets to know his students despite both the evident culture gap and his difficulty adapting to the school system's constraints.

As the children try to move on from their former teacher's suicide, nobody at the school is aware of Bachir's painful past, or his precarious status as a refugee. His wife, who was a teacher and writer, died along with the couple's daughter and son in an arson attack. The murderers were angered by her last book, in which she pointed a finger at those responsible for the country's reconciliation, which had led to the liberation of many perpetrators of serious crimes. The film goes on to explore Bachir's relationships with the students and faculty, and how the students come to grips with their former teacher's suicide. One student, Alice, writes an assignment on the death of their teacher, revealing the deep pain and confusion felt by each of the students.

Bachir eventually comes to be loved and respected by the students he is teaching, but the teacher's death still haunts the students. During a school dance, a student named Simon is found to have a photo of his former teacher. It is revealed that he tried to get her into trouble after she tried to help him through his family struggles. Bachir eventually gets the students to open up about the death, especially Simon, who is blamed and blames himself for causing the teacher's suicide. Eventually, some parents discover that Bachir has no teaching qualification; previously, he had run a restaurant. He is then fired from the school. He asks the principal to be able to teach one more day, convincing her by noting that the old teacher never got to say goodbye to her students.

On his last day, Bachir has his students correct a fable he wrote which is a metaphor of his tragic past life in Algeria and the loss of his family in a fire. Before he leaves, one of his students, Alice (whom he professed to be his favourite to her mother), gives him a tearful hug goodbye.

== Cast ==
- Mohamed Saïd Fellag as Bachir Lazhar
- Sophie Nélisse as Alice L'Écuyer
- Émilien Néron as Simon Gagnon
- Danielle Proulx as Mrs. Vaillancourt
- Brigitte Poupart as Claire Lajoie
- Jules Philip as Gaston
- Daniel Gadouas as Mr. Gilbert Danis
- Louis Champagne as Concierge
- Seddik Benslimane as Abdelmalek
- Marie-Ève Beauregard as Marie-Frédérique
- André Robitaille as Commissioner
- Francine Ruel as Mrs. Dumas
- Sophie Sanscartier as Audrée
- Évelyne de la Chenelière as Alice's mother
- Vincent Millard as Victor
- Louis-David Leblanc as Boris
- Nicole-Sylvie Lagrande as Psychologist
- Gabriel Verdier as Jordan
- Marie Charlebois as Prosecutor
- Marianne Soucy-Lord as Shanel
- Stéphane Demers as Marie-Frédérique's father
- Nathalie Costa as Marie-Frédérique's mother
- Héléna Laliberté as Martine Lachance

== Production ==
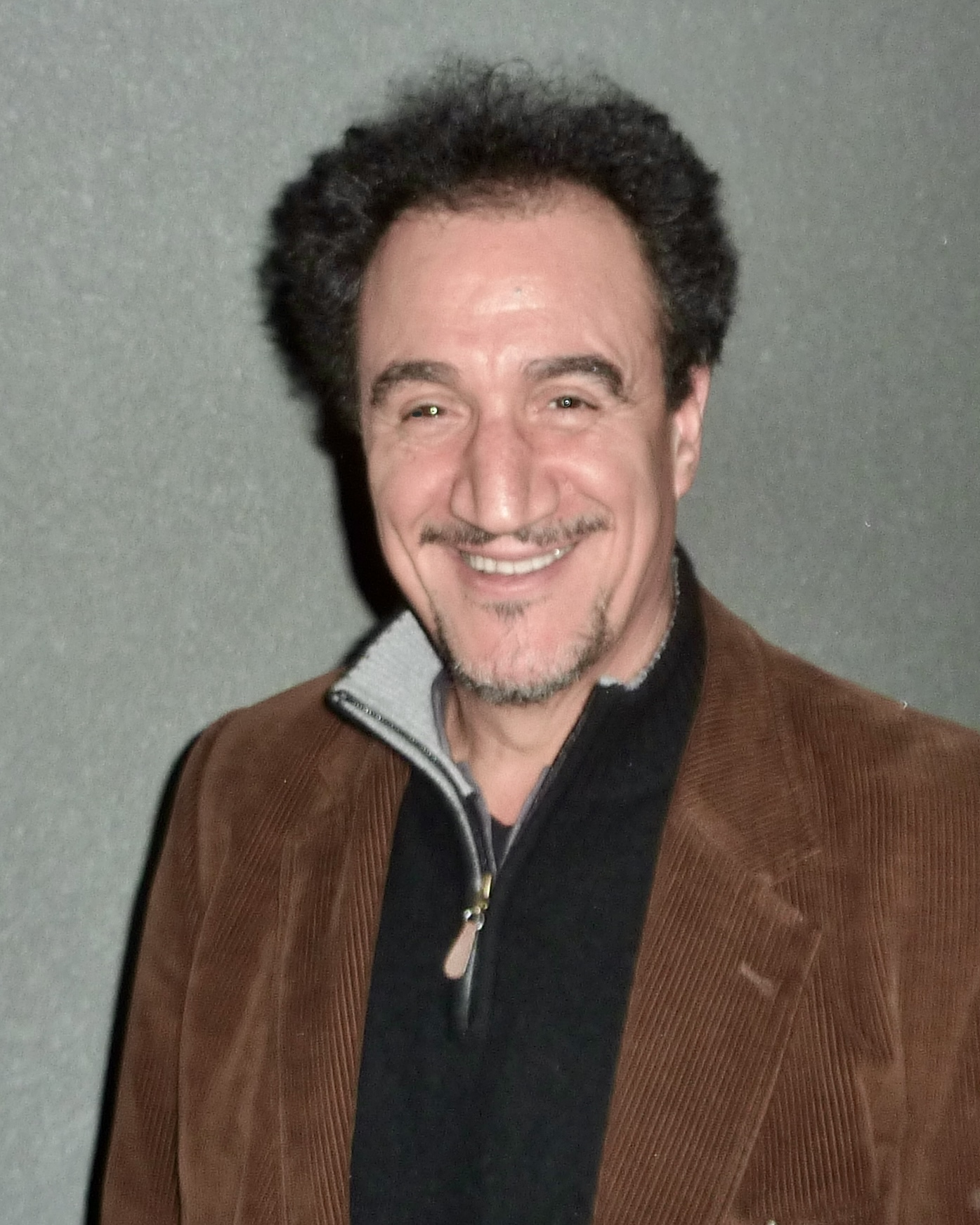
Fellag at the Geneva premiere

The source material Bachir Lazhar is a one-character play, making it a challenge to adapt for the screen. However, producers Luc Dery and Kim McCraw attended a performance with director Philippe Falardeau, and Falardeau expressed excitement about making a film version. Bachir Lazhar author Évelyne de la Chenelière suggested Falardeau cast comedian Mohamed Fellag as the protagonist, and Falardeau learned how to contact Fellag by researching the comedian's YouTube videos. Falardeau said he continuously consulted de la Cheneliere, allowing her to review screenplay drafts.

It was shot in Le Plateau-Mont-Royal, Montreal. There were 28 days of shooting, about an average time for a film to be shot in Quebec. The principal filming occurred in the summer so the production could use the school and so the educations of the child actors were not disrupted. Four of the shooting days occurred in the winter. Child actress Sophie Nélisse turned 10 shortly before shooting began.

== Release ==
Monsieur Lazhar debuted at the Locarno International Film Festival in August 2011, followed by a screening at the Toronto International Film Festival in September 2011. It was featured at the Whistler Film Festival in December 2011, and selected for the 2012 Sundance Film Festival.

The film opened in Montreal on 22 October 2011. It was released in Toronto and Vancouver on 27 January 2012, a few days after it was announced in January 2012 that it was nominated for the Academy Award for Best Foreign Language Film. A limited release in the United States was also planned for April 2012.

In 2023, Telefilm Canada announced that the film was one of 23 titles that will be digitally restored under its new Canadian Cinema Reignited program to preserve classic Canadian films.

== Reception ==
=== Box office ===
By 15 November 2011, the film made $1 million in Quebec theatres. By 19 December 2012, it made over $1 million in the U.S., with Falardeau also claiming success in Japan, the Netherlands and Spain.

Monsieur Lazhar grossed $2,009,517 in North America and $7,065,194 in other countries, for a worldwide total of $9,074,711. Telefilm Canada credited the film, along with Incendies and other films, with doubling domestic and worldwide gross on its works in 2011.

=== Critical response ===
The film received critical acclaim. At Rotten Tomatoes, the film holds a rating of 98%, based on 118 reviews and an average rating of 8.2/10. The website's critical consensus states, "Monsieur Lahzar is a tender and thoughtful portrait of a man with hidden grief and also a compelling exploration of the teacher-student dynamic". It also has a score of 82 on Metacritic, based on 31 reviews, indicating "universal acclaim".

In Canada, Jennie Punter gave it four stars in The Globe and Mail, praising it as "an exquisite, humanistic and subtly topical work of cinema art." Peter Howell gave it four stars in The Toronto Star, complimenting the film for simplicities and complexities, and for Fellag's emotion. The Montreal Gazette's Brendan Kelly credited Philippe Falardeau for keeping the film from becoming overly sentimental.

Roger Ebert awarded it three and a half stars, calling it a film of "no simple questions and simple answers." In The Los Angeles Times, Kenneth Turan praised it for capturing authentic emotions, while refraining from becoming overbearing. Ty Burr rated it three and a half stars in The Boston Globe, judging it to be intimate with realistic portrayals of the children. The Hollywood Reporter's Stephen Farber praised it as a "nearly perfect gem" and commended young actors Nelisse and Émilien Néron. Critic Ann Hornaday of The Washington Post called the film one of the ten best of 2012. Dissenting, David Denby wrote in The New Yorker that the film was smart, but lacked the emotion to take on life.

University of Berlin film scholar Claudia Kotte wrote Monsieur Lazhar, along with Incendies (2010), War Witch and Inch'Allah (2012), represent a break from focus in the Cinema of Quebec on local history to more global concerns. Authors Gada Mahrouse, Chantal Maillé and Daniel Salée wrote McCraw and Déry's films, Incendies, Monsieur Lazhar and Inch'Allah, depict Quebec as part of the global village and as accepting minorities, particularly Middle Easterners or "Muslim Others". They go on to remark that unlike the other two films, all of Monsieur Lazhar is set in Quebec.

=== Accolades ===
The film was selected as the Canadian entry for the Best Foreign Language Film at the 84th Academy Awards, and on 18 January 2012, it was named as one of the nine shortlisted entries for the Oscars. Six days later, the film was named as one of the five nominees. Alongside the Polish-Canadian co-production In Darkness, which was submitted and nominated on behalf of Poland, the two films marked the first time in the history of Canadian cinema that two films with Canadian connections were finalists for the Best Foreign Language Film Oscar in the same year. It is also the second consecutive year that a Canadian film in French was nominated in this category, following the nomination of Denis Villeneuve's Incendies at the 83rd Academy Awards, and with War Witch marking the third consecutive nomination in 2013.

Sophie Nélisse, at 11 years old, tied for the youngest Genie winner in the history of the award ceremony. Nina Petronzio was also 11 when she won Best Actress for Vincent and Me in 1991.

| Award | Date of ceremony | Category | Recipient(s) | Result | Ref(s) |
|---|---|---|---|---|---|
| Academy Awards | 26 February 2012 | Best Foreign Language Film | Philippe Falardeau | Nominated | |
| Festival International du Film Francophone de Namur | 7 October 2011 | Special Jury Prize | Philippe Falardeau | Won | |
| Festival International du Film Francophone de Namur | 7 October 2011 | Audience Award | Philippe Falardeau | Won | |
| Genie Awards | 8 March 2012 | Best Motion Picture | Luc Déry and Kim McCraw | Won | |
| Genie Awards | 8 March 2012 | Best Director | Philippe Falardeau | Won | |
| Genie Awards | 8 March 2012 | Best Adapted Screenplay | Philippe Falardeau | Won | |
| Genie Awards | 8 March 2012 | Best Actor | Mohamed Fellag | Won | |
| Genie Awards | 8 March 2012 | Best Supporting Actress | Sophie Nélisse | Won | |
| Genie Awards | 8 March 2012 | Best Cinematography | Ronald Plante | Nominated | |
| Genie Awards | 8 March 2012 | Best Editing | Stéphane Lafleur | Won | |
| Genie Awards | 8 March 2012 | Best Original Score | Martin Léon | Nominated | |
| Genie Awards | 8 March 2012 | Best Overall Sound | Pierre Bertrand, Shaun-Nicholas Gallagher and Bernard Gariépy Strobl | Nominated | |
| Jutra Awards | 11 March 2012 | Best Film | Luc Déry and Kim McCraw | Won | |
| Jutra Awards | 11 March 2012 | Best Director | Philippe Falardeau | Won | |
| Jutra Awards | 11 March 2012 | Best Screenplay | Philippe Falardeau | Won | |
| Jutra Awards | 11 March 2012 | Best Actor | Mohamed Fellag | Nominated | |
| Jutra Awards | 11 March 2012 | Best Supporting Actor | Émilien Néron | Won | |
| Jutra Awards | 11 March 2012 | Best Supporting Actress | Sophie Nélisse | Won | |
| Jutra Awards | 11 March 2012 | Best Original Music | Martin Léon | Won | |
| Jutra Awards | 11 March 2012 | Best Sound | Pierre Bertrand, Mathieu Beaudin, Sylvain Bellemare and Bernard Gariépy Strobl | Won | |
| Jutra Awards | 11 March 2012 | Most Successful Film Outside Quebec | Philippe Falardeau | Nominated | |
| Locarno International Film Festival | 2011 | Variety Piazza Grande Award | Philippe Falardeau | Won | |
| Locarno International Film Festival | 2011 | UBS Audience Award | Philippe Falardeau | Won | |
| Lumière Awards | 18 January 2013 | Best French-Language Film | Philippe Falardeau | Nominated | |
| Toronto Film Critics Association | 14 December 2011 | Best Canadian Film | Philippe Falardeau | Won | |
| Toronto International Film Festival | 8–18 September 2011 | Best Canadian Film | Philippe Falardeau | Won | |
| Whistler Film Festival | 2011 | Audience Award | Philippe Falardeau | Won | |
| Prix collégial du cinéma québécois | 2012 | Best Film | Monsieur Lazhar | Nominated | |
| Young Artist Awards | 5 May 2013 | Best Young Actor in an International Feature Film | Émilien Néron | Nominated | |
| Young Artist Awards | 5 May 2013 | Best Young Actress in an International Feature Film | Sophie Nélisse | Nominated | |

== See also ==
- List of submissions to the 84th Academy Awards for Best Foreign Language Film
- List of Canadian submissions for the Academy Award for Best Foreign Language Film
