= Évelyne de la Chenelière =

Canadian writer and actress

Évelyne de la Chenelière (born 1975) is a Canadian writer and actress. She is best known for her plays Désordre public, which won the Governor General's Award for French-language drama in 2006, and Bashir Lazhar, which was the screenplay basis for the 2011 film Monsieur Lazhar.

She studied at Villa Maria College (class of 1992) and Collège Jean-de-Brébeuf. She then began studies in modern literature at the Sorbonne and theater at the École Michel-Granvale in Paris .

As an actress, de la Chenelière had supporting roles in Monsieur Lazhar, Days of Darkness (L'Âge des ténèbres), Another House (L'autre maison), Café de Flore, Laughter (Le Rire), Mademoiselle Kenopsia and Paradise, as well as working extensively on stage.

She published her first novel, La concordance des temps, in 2011.

Her father is the publisher and philanthropist Michel de la Chenelière. She lives in Montreal.

== Works ==
=== Plays ===
- 1997: Personnages secondaires
- 1999: Au bout du fil
- 1999: Des fraises en janvier
- 2000: Culpa
- 2000: Toka
- 2000: Élucubrations couturières
- 2001: Les journaux de ma grand-mère (dans Yanardagh)
- 2002: Bashir Lazhar
- 2002: Henri & Margaux
- 2004: Aphrodite en 04
- 2004: Nicht retour, mademoiselle
- 2005: Chinoiseries
- 2005: L'héritage de Darwin
- 2006: Désordre public
- 2006: L'Éblouissement du chevreuil
- 2009: L'imposture

=== Novels ===
- 2011: La concordance des temps
