= Nathalie Moliavko-Visotzky =

Canadian cinematographer (born 1953)

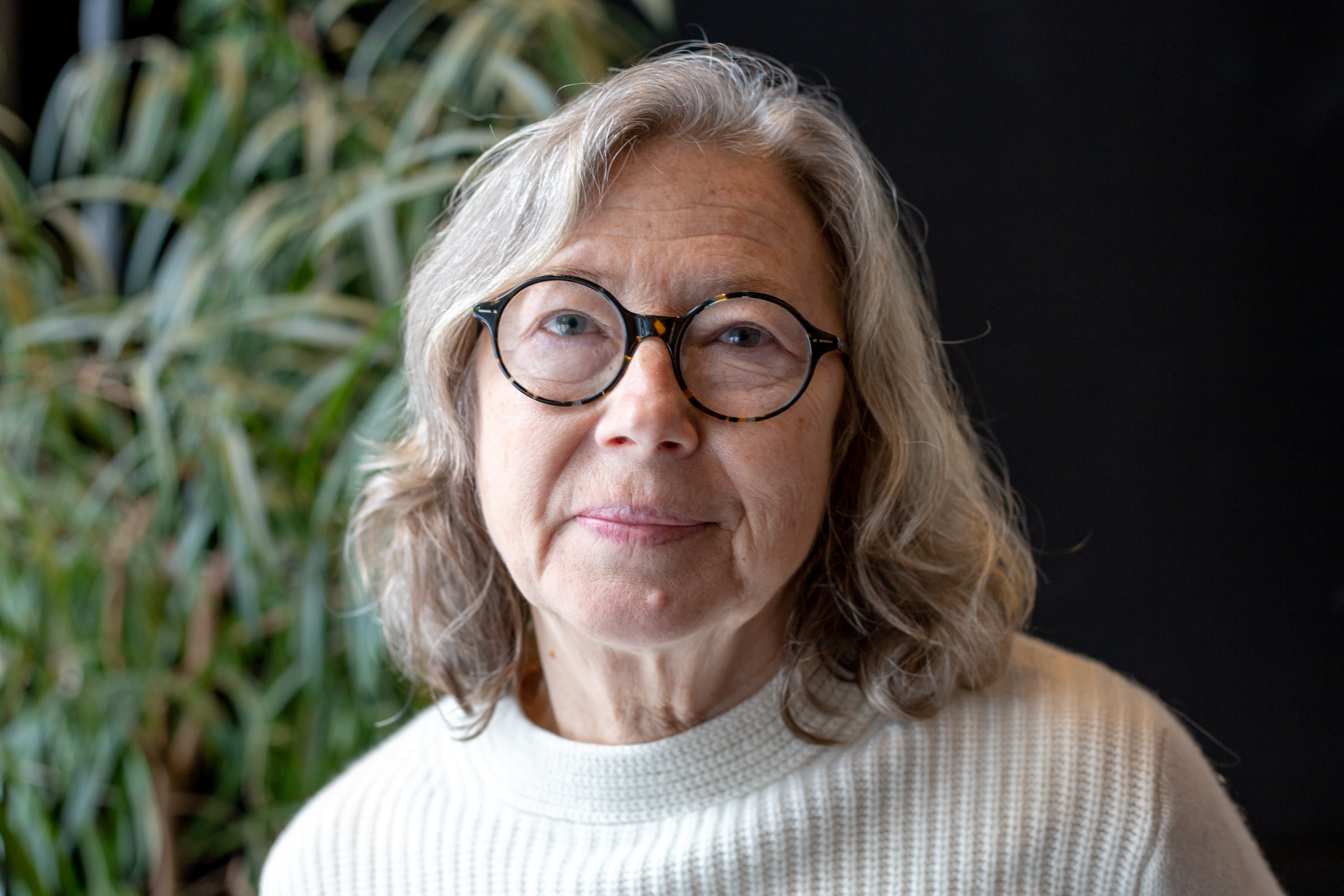
- Born: May 18, 1953 (age 72); Sydney, Australia
- Occupation: cinematographer
- Years active: 1970s-present

Nathalie Moliavko-Visotzky (born May 18, 1953) is a Canadian cinematographer. She is most noted as a three-time Jutra Award nominee for Best Cinematography, receiving nods at the 3rd Jutra Awards in 2001 for The Three Madeleines (Les Fantômes des 3 Madeleine), at the 6th Jutra Awards in 2004 for Ma voisine danse le ska, and at the 16th Jutra Awards in 2014 for Catimini.

Originally from Sydney, Australia, she began working for the National Film Board of Canada in the late 1970s. She subsequently worked as a camera assistant on films by Denys Arcand, Jean-Claude Lauzon and Jacques Leduc before securing her own credits as lead cinematographer.

Her other credits as a cinematographer have included the films Perreault Dancer (Danser Perreault), So the Moon Rises (La lune viendra d'elle-même), Martyrs, The Kate Logan Affair, French Immersion, The Storm Within (Rouge sang), Frameworks: Images of a Changing World (Dans un océan d'images), An Eye for Beauty (Le règne de la beauté), Forgotten Flowers (Les fleurs oubliées), Apapacho, On Earth as in Heaven (Sur la terre comme au ciel) and Ababooned (Ababouiné).
