= Larissa Corriveau =

Canadian actress

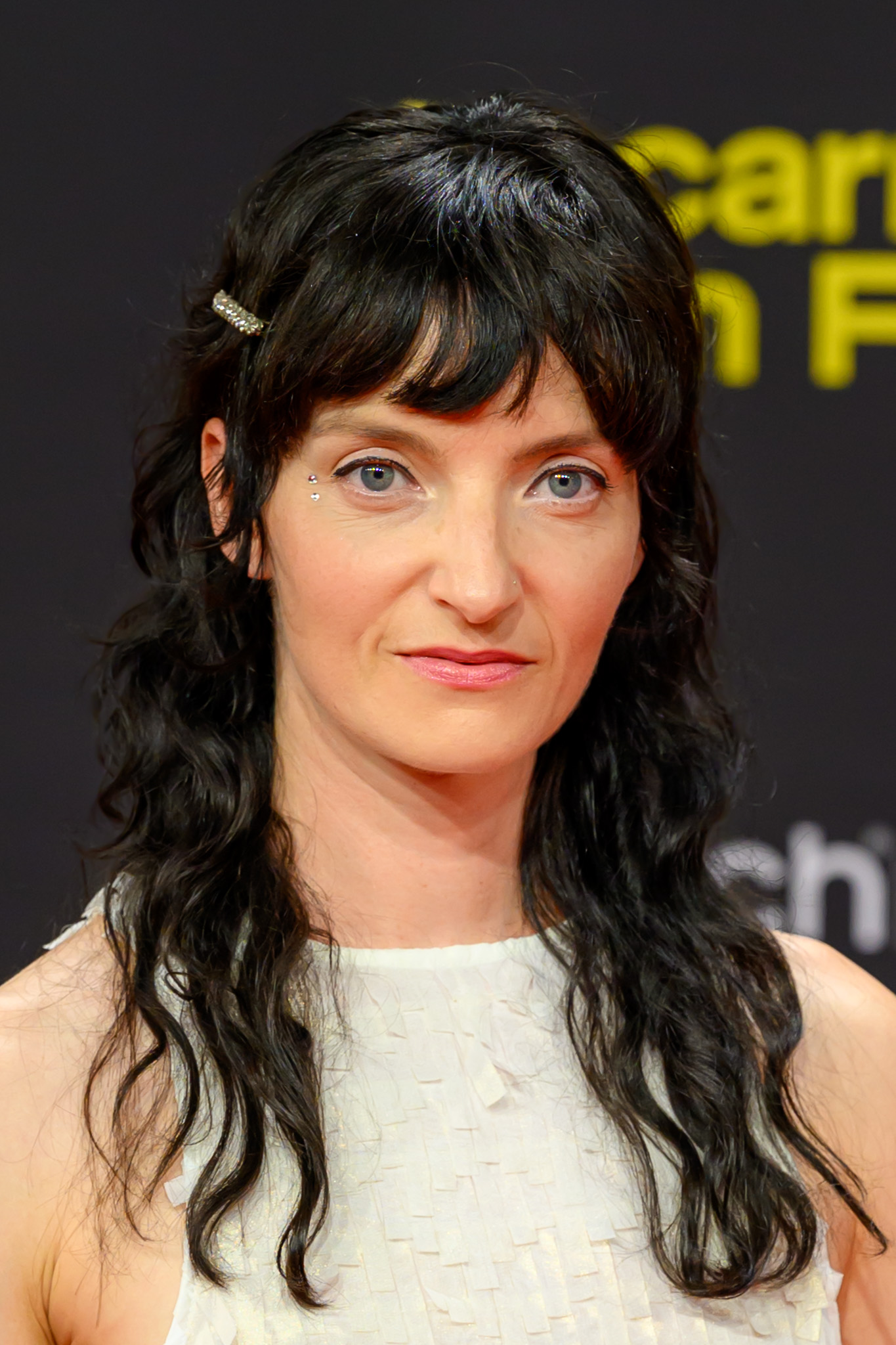
- Corriveau in 2026
- Occupation: Actress

Larissa Corriveau is a Canadian actress from Montreal, Quebec.

In 2019, she drew acclaim for her film debut in Denis Côté’s Ghost Town Anthology (International Competition, 69th Berlin international Film Festival); her portrayal of the fragile and mystical Adèle was unanimously lauded by critics, who called her the “revelation of the film", for which she received a Canadian Screen Award nomination for Best Supporting Actress at the 8th Canadian Screen Awards and a Prix Iris nomination for Best Supporting Actress at the 21st Quebec Cinema Awards. She went on to act in several other film productions as a main character : Denis Côté’s Social Hygiene, That Kind of Summer and Mademoiselle Kenopsia; Stéphane Lafleur’s Viking; Ara Ball’s Hurricane Boy Fuck You Tabarnak! and Marie Brassard's The Train (Le Train).

She also received a Canadian Screen Award nomination for Best Lead Performance in a Film at the 11th Canadian Screen Awards and a Best Actress nomination in a lead role at the 24th Quebec Cinema Awards in 2022 for That Kind of Summer Un été comme ça. At the 25th Quebec Cinema Awards in 2023, she received a Best Actress nomination for Viking.

She has been a finalist for the Prix Arthur Rimbaud from the Maison de Poésie de Paris (2007 and 2008). Her poems have been read as part of numerous events and published in literary journals in Montreal and Paris, France.

As a filmmaker she directed several short films as well as music videos for musicians Marie Davidson, Essaie pas and underground band Chienvoler.

She has also appeared in more than 40 theatre plays and many television series.

== Filmography ==
=== Movies ===
- 2019 - Ghost Town Anthology (Répertoire des villes disparues) by Denis Côté : Adèle
- 2020 - Like the Ones I Used to Know (Les grandes claques) by Annie St-Pierre (short film)
- 2021 - Social Hygiene (Hygiène sociale) by Denis Côté : Solveig
- 2022 - That Kind of Summer (Un été comme ça) by Denis Côté : Léonie
- 2022 - Viking by Stéphane Lafleur : Steven
- 2023 - Mademoiselle Kenopsia by Denis Côté : Guardian of Spaces
- 2023 - Soleil de nuit by Fernando Lopez Escriva and Maria Camila Arias (short film)
- 2024 - Hurricane Boy Fuck You Tabarnak! (L'Ouragan F.Y.T.!) by Ara Ball : Florence
- 2025 - The Train (Le Train) by Marie Brassard : Thérèse
- 2026 - Nobody's Violence (Violence du corps de l'autre) by Denis Côté : Mira

=== Television ===
- 2022: Motel Paradis: "Polo" Ouellet
