= Mademoiselle Kenopsia =

- Directed by: Denis Côté
- Screenplay by: Denis Côté
- Produced by: Vincent Biron; Denis Côté; Guillaume Vasseur
- Starring: Larissa Corriveau
- Cinematography: Vincent Biron
- Edited by: Terence Chotard
- Production company: Voyelles Films
- Distributed by: H264 Distribution
- Release date: August 5, 2023 (Locarno)
- Running time: 80 minutes
- Country: Canada
- Language: French
- Budget: Under C$20,000

Mademoiselle Kenopsia is a 2023 Canadian film written and directed by Denis Côté. Starring Larissa Corriveau, the film centres on a solitary woman who watches over empty spaces. It premiered at the 76th Locarno Film Festival and later screened at the 2023 Toronto International Film Festival. It won the main prize at the 2023 Ostrava Kamera Oko International Film Festival.

== Synopsis ==
The film stars Larissa Corriveau as the "Guardian of Spaces", a woman who moves through empty interior spaces and watches over them. Her isolation is interrupted by visitors and uncertain telephone conversations.

== Cast ==
The cast includes:

- Larissa Corriveau
- Evelyne de la Chenelière
- Olivier Aubin
- Hinde Rabbaj

== Production ==
The film was produced by Voyelles Films, with financial participation from SODEC and support from Post-Moderne. It was written and directed by Denis Côté. Filming took place over eight days in August 2022 in Saint-Hyacinthe, Pierrefonds and Montreal. The film had an approximate budget of less than C$20,000.

According to Côté, the film was inspired in part by experiences of seclusion, confinement and isolation during the COVID-19 pandemic, which led him to think about how spaces become functional or take on new meanings.

== Release ==
The film had its world premiere out of competition in the Fuori concorso section of the Locarno Film Festival in August 2023. It had its North American premiere in the Wavelengths programme at the 2023 Toronto International Film Festival.

== Reception ==
=== Critical response ===
Martin Kudlac of Screen Anarchy described the film as "an introspective examination of solitude" and wrote that its themes of isolation and confinement marked it as "a distinctly COVID-era cinematic endeavor". He also described the film as minimalist and wrote that it "resists easy categorization".

Mehdi Balamissa of Film Fest Report described the film as a "hypnotic and enigmatic cinematic journey" and praised Larissa Corriveau’s lead performance, while writing that the film’s concept "may feel stretched at times".

=== Awards ===
At the 15th Ostrava Kamera Oko International Film Festival in 2023, Mademoiselle Kenopsia won the main prize. At the 2024 Prix RÉALS, the film won the Œuvre Art et essai award.
