= Ma voisine danse le ska =

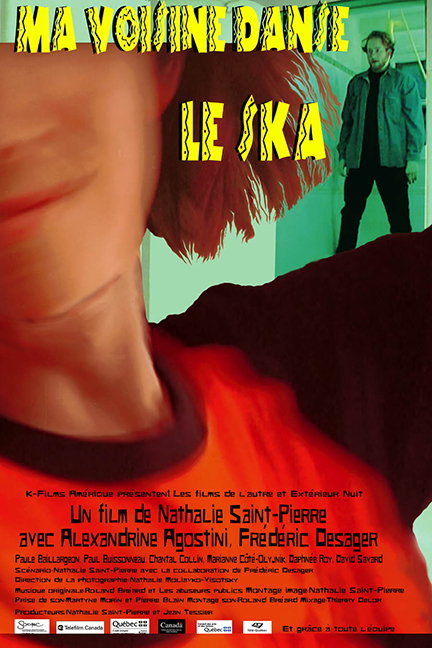
- Directed by: Nathalie Saint-Pierre
- Written by: Nathalie Saint-Pierre
- Produced by: Nathalie Saint-Pierre
- Starring: Frédéric Desager; Alexandrine Agostini
- Cinematography: Nathalie Moliavko-Visotzky
- Edited by: Nathalie Saint-Pierre
- Music by: Roland Bréard; Les Amuseurs Publics
- Production companies: Extérieur Nuit; Les Films de l'Autre
- Distributed by: K Films Amérique
- Release date: October 26, 2003 (FCIAT)
- Running time: 89 minutes
- Country: Canada
- Language: French

Ma voisine danse le ska (lit. "My Neighbour Dances Ska") is a Canadian comedy-drama film, directed by Nathalie Saint-Pierre and released in 2003. The film stars Frédéric Desager as Auguste, a photographer grieving the recent death of his wife and child in an accident, who finds a new lease on life when he connects with his neighbour Isabelle (Alexandrine Agostini), a lonely single mother.

The cast also includes Paul Buissonneau, Paule Baillargeon, Chantal Collin, Marianne Côté-Olyjnik, Marcelo Arroyo, Sylvie Belleau, Jean-Robert Bourdage, Paul-Patrick Charbonneau, Marie-Hélène Copti, Marie-Clément De Wit, France Galarneau, Alain Gendreau, Christine Harvey, Chantal Huard, Sophie Kobrynsky, Steve Laplante and Agnès Larouche in supporting roles.

The film premiered in October 2003 at the Abitibi-Témiscamingue International Film Festival, before opening theatrically in November.

== Awards ==
Nathalie Moliavko-Visotzky received a Jutra Award nomination for Best Cinematography at the 6th Jutra Awards in 2004.
