= Waitresses Wanted =

- French: Serveuses demandées
- Directed by: Guylaine Dionne
- Written by: Guylaine Dionne
- Produced by: Kevin Tierney
- Starring: Clara Furey; Janaina Suaudeau; Colm Feore
- Release date: December 5, 2008
- Running time: 110 minutes
- Country: Canada
- Language: French

Waitresses Wanted (French: Serveuses demandées) is a 2008 Canadian drama film starring Clara Furey, Janaina Suaudeau and Colm Feore. It was written and directed by Guylaine Dionne.

== Plot ==
Priscilla Paredes, a Brazilian native takes a job as a stripper in order to stay in Montreal after her student visa expires.

== Cast ==
- Janaina Suaudeau as Priscilla
- Clara Furey as Milagro
- Colm Feore as Sergeant Conner
- Anne Dorval as Milagro's mother
