= Frédéric Desager =

Belgian-Canadian film and television actor

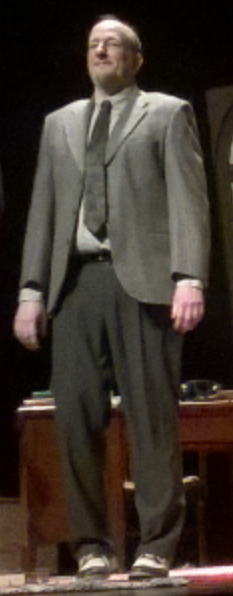
- Born: August 7, 1969 (age 56); Brussels, Belgium
- Years active: 199os–present

Frédéric Desager (born August 7, 1969) is a Belgian-Canadian actor based in Quebec. He is most noted for his performance in the film The Countess of Baton Rouge (La Comtesse de Bâton Rouge), for which he was a Genie Award nominee for Best Supporting Actor at the 18th Genie Awards in 1997.

== Filmography ==
Year	Title	Role	Notes
1996	The Countess of Baton Rouge (La Comtesse de Bâton Rouge)	The Great Zenon	
1996	Karmina	Denis	
1997	The Assignment	KGB Agent	
1998	August 32nd on Earth (Un 32 août sur terre)	Stéphane	
2003	Ma voisine danse le ska	Auguste	
2003	Red Nose (Nez rouge)	Waiter	
2003	Seducing Doctor Lewis (La Grande Séduction)	Dr. Paul Gosselin	
2004	Bittersweet Memories (Ma vie en cinémascope)	Priest	
2004	In the Eye of the Cat (Dans l'oeil du chat)	Patrick	
2005	The Outlander (Le Survenant)	Paulo Marin	
2005	The United States of Albert (Les États-Unis d'Albert)	Sheriff	
2017	Hochelaga, Land of Souls (Hochelaga, terre des âmes)	Macé Jalobert	
2021	Felix and the Treasure of Morgäa (Félix et le trésor de Morgäa)		
