= Mathieu Charbonneau =

Canadian musician and composer

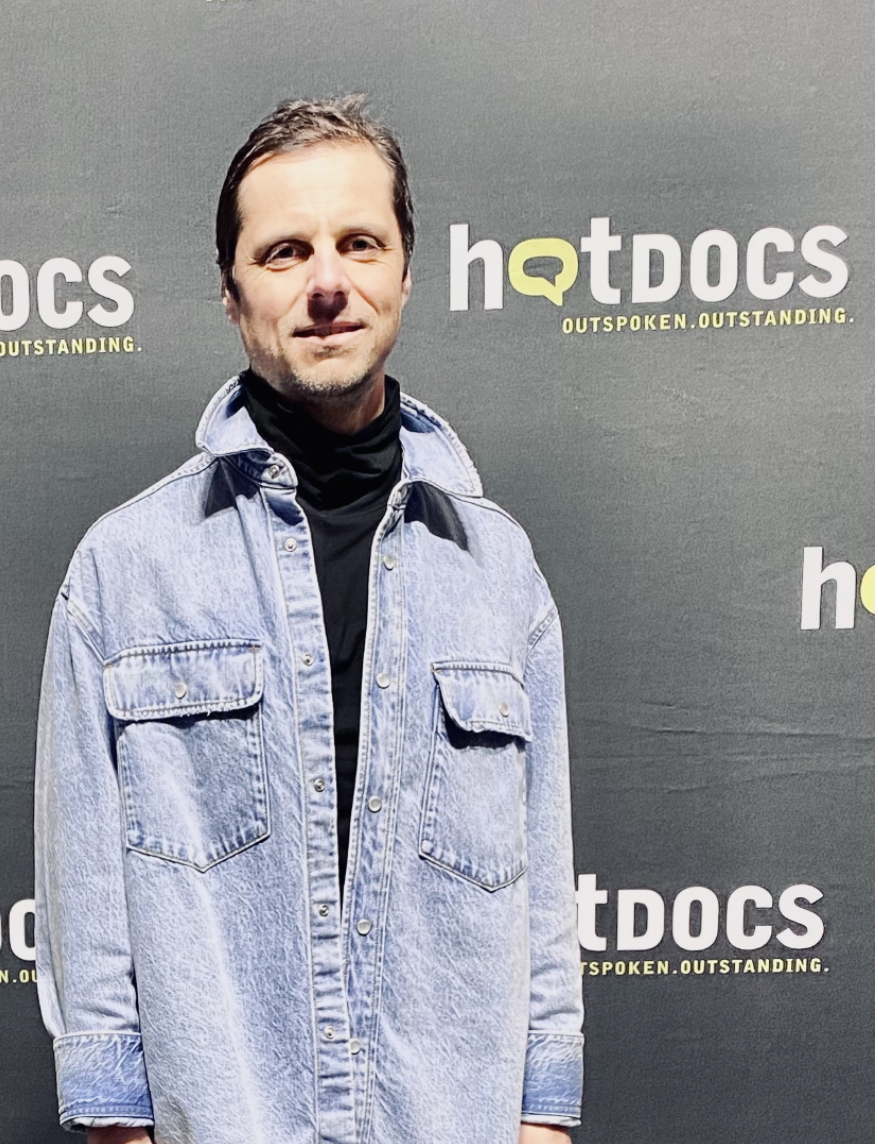

Background information
- Born: 1981 (age 44–45); Cumberland, Ontario, Canada
- Origin: Montreal, Quebec, Canada
- Occupations: Musician, record producer, film composer
- Instruments: Piano, keyboards, synthesizers, euphonium
- Years active: 2000s–present
- Website: www.mathieucharbonneau.com

Mathieu Charbonneau (born 1981) is a Canadian musician, record producer, and film composer, originally from Cumberland, Ontario, and currently based in Montreal, Quebec.

Charbonneau has composed music for film and television, including A Colony (Une colonie), directed by Geneviève Dulude-De Celles; Goddess of the Fireflies (La déesse des mouches à feu), directed by Anaïs Barbeau-Lavalette; Viking, directed by Stéphane Lafleur; and Lac-Mégantic: This Is Not an Accident (Lac-Mégantic: ceci n'est pas un accident), directed by Philippe Falardeau. His score for Viking, co-composed with Christophe Lamarche-Ledoux was nominated for Best Original Music at the 25th Quebec Cinema Awards.

In 2011 he contributed to the National Parks Project, visiting Prince Albert National Park with Andre Ethier, Rebecca Foon and Lafleur to shoot and score a short documentary film about the park.

He is an active member of the bands Avec pas d'casque, Torngat, Charbonneau/Amato, Ferriswheel and Organ Mood. He was also a member of The Luyas from 2010 to 2014, and Timber Timbre from 2013 to 2019.

In addition to his work as a film composer, Charbonneau has produced records for artists such as Maude Audet, Émilie Laforest, and Joëlle Saint-Pierre.

== Filmography ==
- Eye on Juliet - 2017
- A Colony (Une colonie) - 2018
- Goddess of the Fireflies (La déesse des mouches à feu)- 2020
- Brainstream - 2021
- White Dog (Chien blanc) - 2022
- Viking - 2022
- Lac-Mégantic: This Is Not an Accident (Lac-Mégantic : Ceci n’est pas un accident) - 2023
- When Adam Changes (Adam change lentement) - 2023 (score producer)
- Gamma Rays (Les rayons gamma) - 2023
- The Thawing of Ice (La fonte des glaces) - 2024
- The Death Tour - 2024
- Entropic Memory (Mémoire entropique) - 2024
- At All Kosts (Koutkékout) - 2024
- Tricoté serré crépu - 2026
- This Love, These Days (Mon amour, c’est pour le restant de mes jours) - 2026
- A Fire There - 2026
- Saigon Story: Two Shootings in the Forest Kingdom - 2026
- Reveries of a Solitary Trucker (Rêveries d’un routier solitaire) - 2026

== Awards and nominations ==
Award	Year	Category	Work	Result	Ref.
Canadian Screen Awards	2023	Digital Media Immersive Fiction Experience	Brainstream (with Caroline Robert and Vincent Morissette)	Nominated	
Félix Awards	2012	Album of the Year – Critics' Choice	Astronomie (with Avec pas d'casque)	Won	
Félix Awards	2025	Album of the Year – Folk	Cardinal (with Avec pas d'casque)	Won	
Quebec Cinema Awards	2023	Best Original Music	Viking (with Christophe Lamarche-Ledoux)	Nominated	
SOCAN Songwriting Prize	2012	French Song	"Intuition #1" (with Avec pas d'casque)	Nominated	
SOCAN Songwriting Prize	2013	French Song	"Walkie-talkie" (with Avec pas d'casque)	Nominated	
