= Marie-Evelyne Lessard =

Canadian actress

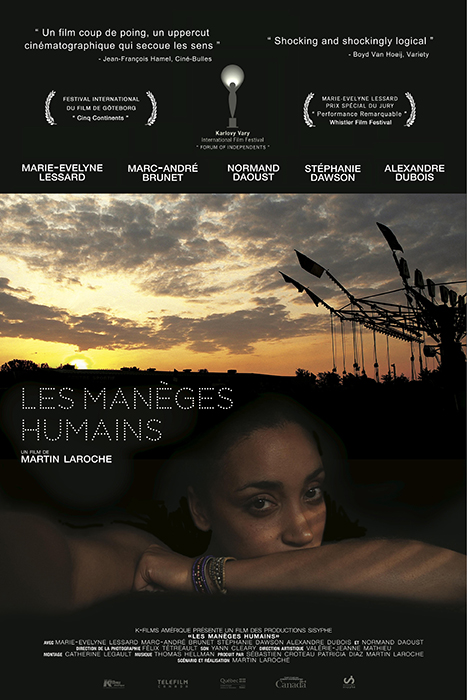
Poster of the movie Fair Sex.

Marie-Evelyne Lessard is a Canadian film and television actress. She is most noted for her performance in the 2012 film Fair Sex (Les Manèges humains), for which she received a Jutra Award nomination for Best Actress at the 16th Jutra Awards in 2014.

She has also appeared in the films Ville-Marie, The Decline (Jusqu'au déclin), Fanmi and The Last Meal (Le Dernier repas), the television series Unité 9, Les Argonautes, Trauma and 19-2, and the web series Féminin/Féminin.
