= Frédérick Pelletier =

Canadian film director and screenwriter

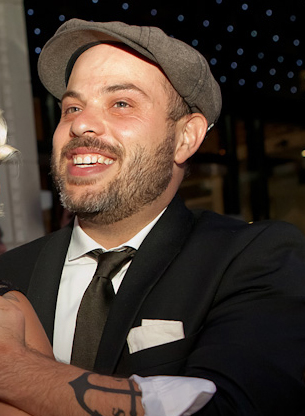
- Born: March 24, 1975 (age 51); Lévis, Quebec, Canada
- Occupations: Film director, screenwriter
- Years active: 1972–present

Frédérick Pelletier (born March 24, 1975) is a Canadian film director, screenwriter and academic from Quebec. He is most noted for his 2013 film Diego Star, for which he received a Jutra Award nomination for Best Screenplay at the 16th Jutra Awards in 2014.

== Background ==
A graduate of the film studies program at Concordia University, he worked for the Cinémathèque québécoise and the National Film Board of Canada while he was still a student. He was subsequently a film critic and editor for the online film magazine Hors Champ from 2000 to 2005.

== Film career ==
He released the documentary short film Lasting Winter (L'Hiver longtemps) in 2005, and followed up with the narrative short Nobody (L'air de rien) in 2006. Nobody was a Jutra Award nominee for Best Live Action Short Film at the 8th Jutra Awards.

He subsequently collaborated with Olivier Tétreault on Library Rats and Freestyle Bowling, short comedy films for the art collective The 7 Fingers.

Diego Star premiered in the Bright Future program at the 2013 International Film Festival Rotterdam, and had its Canadian premiere at the Festival du nouveau cinéma in September 2013. In addition to Pelletier's Best Screenplay nomination at the Jutra Awards, the film was also a nominee for Best Film. It was also a nominee for the Prix collégial du cinéma québécois in 2014.

He has since been a professor in the film studies program at the Université du Québec à Montréal, and a programmer for the Rendez-vous Québec Cinéma.

His second feature film, Un homme libre, is slated for release in 2026. Michel Brault, l'instinct de vue, a documentary film about the life and career of Quebec filmmaker Michel Brault, is also upcoming.
