= Diego Star =

2013 Canadian drama film

- Film poster
- Directed by: Frédérick Pelletier
- Written by: Frédérick Pelletier
- Produced by: Pascal Bascaron; Sylvain Corbeil; Nancy Grant; Marion Hänsel
- Starring: Isaka Sawadogo; Chloé Bourgeois
- Cinematography: Philippe Roy
- Edited by: Marie-Hélène Dozo
- Production companies: Metafilms; Man's Films
- Distributed by: FiGa Films
- Release date: January 25, 2013
- Running time: 87 minutes
- Country: Canada
- Language: French
- Box office: $11,000

Diego Star is a Canadian drama film, directed by Frédérick Pelletier and released in 2013. Set in Lévis, Quebec where a Russian cargo ship has been docked following a serious on-board accident, the film traces the journey of Traoré (Isaka Sawadogo), the ship's Ivorian mechanic, through both his decision to blow the whistle on the crew's neglect of ship maintenance issues and his developing friendship with Fanny (Chloé Bourgeois), the local woman with whom he has been billeted during the ship's time in Lévis.

The film premiered in the Bright Future program at the 2013 International Film Festival Rotterdam. It had its Canadian premiere at the Festival du nouveau cinéma in September 2013.

== Awards ==
The film received five Prix Jutra nominations at the 16th Jutra Awards in 2014, for Best Film, Best Actor (Sawadogo), Best Actress (Bourgeois), Best Screenplay (Pelletier) and Best Art Direction (Marjorie Rhéaume).

The film was shortlisted for the Prix collégial du cinéma québécois in 2014.

== Release ==
Diego Star was released on DVD on April 1, 2014.
