= That Kind of Summer =

- French: Un été comme ça
- Directed by: Denis Côté
- Screenplay by: Denis Côté
- Produced by: Sylvain Corbeil; Audrey-Ann Dupuis-Pierre
- Starring: Larissa Corriveau; Laure Giappiconi; Samir Guesmi; Aude Mathieu; Anne Ratte-Polle
- Cinematography: François Messier-Rheault
- Edited by: Dounia Sichov
- Production company: Metafilms
- Distributed by: Maison 4:3
- Release date: 14 February 2022 (Berlin)
- Running time: 137 minutes
- Country: Canada
- Language: French
- Budget: C$2 million to C$3 million

That Kind of Summer (French: Un été comme ça) is a 2022 Canadian drama film written and directed by Denis Côté. Starring Larissa Corriveau, Laure Giappiconi and Aude Mathieu, the film follows three women at a secluded retreat for sexual discomfort. It had its world premiere in competition at the 72nd Berlin International Film Festival.

== Synopsis ==
Geisha, Léonie and Eugénie are three women who voluntarily spend 26 days at a secluded lakeside house to examine sexual discomfort. They are supervised by a German therapist and a social worker. The stay is framed as an inquiry into varied experiences and extremes of desire rather than as therapy.

== Cast ==
The cast includes:

- Larissa Corriveau as Léonie
- Laure Giappiconi as Eugénie
- Aude Mathieu as Geisha
- Anne Ratte-Polle as Octavia
- Samir Guesmi as Sami
- Josée Deschênes as Diane
- Marie-Claude Guérin as Mathilde
- Anissa Lahyane as Monika

== Production ==
The film was produced by Metafilms, with financial participation from Telefilm Canada, SODEC and the Harold Greenberg Fund. It was written and directed by Denis Côté. Filming took place over 24 days from 8 August to 10 September 2021 in the Laurentides. The film was shot on Super 16 mm and had an approximate budget of C$2 million to C$3 million.

== Release ==
In January 2022, France’s Shellac became the film’s worldwide sales agent. The film had its world premiere in competition at the 72nd Berlin International Film Festival on 14 February 2022.

== Reception ==
=== Critical response ===
Peter Debruge of Variety described the film as a "radically nonjudgmental" drama about sexuality, but criticized it as slow and dramatically inert. He wrote that Côté avoided sensationalizing female sexuality, while finding that the film felt like "the foundation for a story that never materializes".

Peter Bradshaw of The Guardian wrote that he was unsure how to view the film’s "exploitative aesthetic", but found that its characters and performances developed into something poignant and melancholy. He concluded that the film was, "against the odds, rather affecting".

Carson Lund of Slant Magazine wrote that the film was "more exploratory than prescriptive" and praised its refusal to take a fixed position on its subjects. He described the film as "a tender portrait of solidarity", while finding its fantasy sequences less effective than its character-driven scenes.

=== Awards and nominations ===
Year	Award	Category	Recipients/ Nominees	Result	Ref(s)
2022	Berlin International Film Festival	Golden Bear	That Kind of Summer	Nominated	
2023	Prix collégial du cinéma québécois	Best Film	That Kind of Summer	Nominated	
