= Vic and Flo Saw a Bear =

2013 film

- Film poster
- French: Vic+Flo ont vu un ours
- Directed by: Denis Côté
- Written by: Denis Côté
- Produced by: Sylvain Corbeil; Stéphanie Morissette
- Starring: Pierrette Robitaille; Romane Bohringer; Marc-André Grondin
- Cinematography: Ian Lagarde
- Production companies: La Maison de prod. Metafilms
- Distributed by: FunFilm Distribution
- Release date: 10 February 2013 (Berlin)
- Running time: 95 minutes
- Country: Canada
- Language: French
- Budget: C$2.2 million

Vic and Flo Saw a Bear (French: Vic+Flo ont vu un ours) is a 2013 Canadian drama film written and directed by Denis Côté. The film stars Pierrette Robitaille and Romane Bohringer as former cellmates who reunite after Victoria is released from prison and move to rural Quebec. It premiered in competition at the 63rd Berlin International Film Festival, where it won the Alfred Bauer Prize.

== Synopsis ==
After being released from prison, Victoria moves to a remote cabin in rural Quebec, where she is monitored by Guillaume, a young parole officer. She is joined by Florence, a former cellmate with whom she had been intimate in prison. As the two women try to rebuild their lives outside prison, unresolved events from the past threaten their fragile new arrangement.

== Cast ==
The cast includes:

- Pierrette Robitaille as Victoria
- Romane Bohringer as Florence
- Marc-André Grondin as Guillaume
- Marie Brassard as Jackie / Marina St-Jean
- Georges Molinar as Émile Champagne
- Olivier Aubin as Nicolas Smith
- Pier-Luc Funk as Charlot Smith
- Guy Thauvette as Yvon Champagne
- Ramon Cespedes as Jackie’s accomplice
- Dany Boudreault as the go-kart driver
- Johanne Haberlin as the bar manager
- Ted Pluviose as the lover
- Raoul Fortier-Mercier as the cadet

== Production ==
The film was produced by La Maison de prod. and Metafilms. It was written and directed by Denis Côté. Filming took place from August 13 to September 16, 2012, and the film had an approximate budget of C$2.2 million.

== Reception ==
=== Awards and nominations ===
At the 63rd Berlin International Film Festival, the film premiered in competition and won the Alfred Bauer Prize. It also won Best Canadian Feature Film at the 2013 Festival international du cinéma francophone en Acadie and the Bayard d’or for Best Screenplay at the 2013 Festival international du film francophone de Namur.

In 2014, the film won the Prix collégial du cinéma québécois for Best Film. At the 16th Jutra Awards, Pierrette Robitaille won Best Actress, while the film was also nominated for Best Director for Côté, Best Supporting Actress for Brassard, Best Screenplay for Côté, and Most Successful Film Outside Quebec.

Romane Bohringer received a Vancouver Film Critics Circle nomination for Best Supporting Actress in a Canadian Film at the Vancouver Film Critics Circle Awards 2013.

=== Critical response ===
Boyd van Hoeij of Variety described it as a “hard-to-classify” film that shifts between menace, revenge drama and romance, and called it Côté’s “most accomplished work yet”.

Filmdienst described the film as understated and built around unusual characters and a mysterious atmosphere. The review said it draws viewers into an unpredictable reality, finding it entertaining but also somewhat cerebral.
