= Fellag =

Algerian actor (born 1950)

Mohamed Fellag
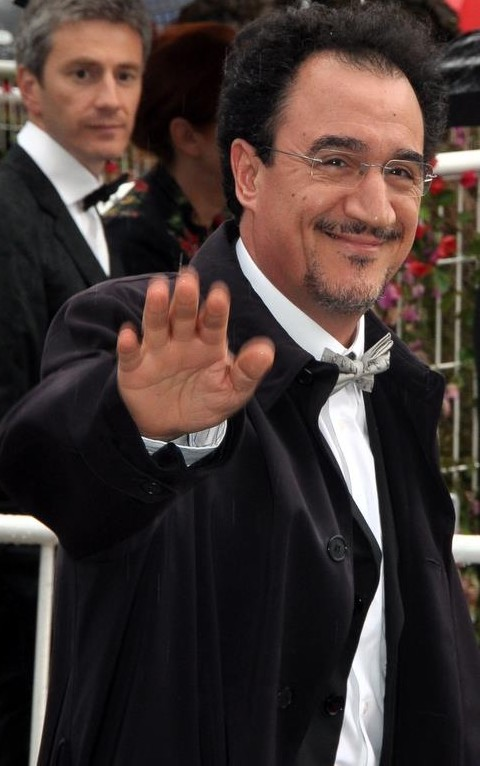
- Fellag at the 2012 Cannes Film Festival.
- Born: Moh-Saïd Fellag; 31 March 1950 (age 76); Azeffoun, Tizi Ouzou, Algeria
- Citizenship: Algeria; France
- Education: Ecole Jeanmaire; School of Dramatic Arts of Algiers; National Theatre of Algiers
- Occupation: Actor
- Years active: 1978–present
- Spouse: Marianne Épin
- Awards: Genie Award

Mohamed Fellag (born 31 March 1950 in Azeffoun, Tizi Ouzou) is an Algerian comedian, writer, humorist, and actor. In 1958, at the height of the Algerian war of independence, his father took him and his younger brother, for their safety, to stay with an aunt in Beni-Messous (then a very small village near Algiers) where they went to primary school. He did his secondary studies in Tizi-Ouzou (Ecole Jeanmaire and CEG.) He entered the School of Dramatic Arts of Algiers in 1968 and stayed there for four years performing in several theatres throughout Algeria.

== Career ==
From 1978 to 1985, he participated in several theatrical productions, before returning to Algeria in 1985 to join the National Theatre of Algeria to play the principal role in Eduardo De Filippo's production of L’Art de la Comédie. In 1986, he played in Ray Bradbury's Le Costume Blanc Couleur Glace à la Noix de Coco and created Les Aventures de Tchop, his first one-man show. He acted in a number of movies and TV shows during the period of turbulence in Algeria during the late 80s and early 90s. In 1989 he wrote the play Cocktail Khorotov and SOS Labès in 1990. He followed this in 1992 with Un bateau pour l'Australie-Babor Australia. In 1995, after a bomb explosion during one of his presentations, he moved first to Tunisia and then to France. There he found success on stage with his plays that confronted the social difficulties of France. He has appeared in numerous films, particularly since 2005, including the Oscar-nominated Monsieur Lazhar, for which he won a Canadian Genie Award for Best Actor in a Leading Role.

== Awards and prizes ==
- Prix du Syndicat de la Critique (Critics' Circle Award) – 1998
- Prince Claus Award - 1999
- Raymond Devos prize – 2003
- Prix de la SACD de la Francophonie – 2003

== Plays ==
- Cocktail Khorotov, 1989
- SOS Labes, 1990
- Un Bateau pour l'Australie, 1992
- Djurdjurassic Bled, 1998
- La Casbah, 2003 with Biyouna
- Le Dernier chameau, 2004.
- L'ère des Ninjas et Djurdjurassic (Les Dinosaures) in the théâtre of gymnase Marie-Bell, 2007

== Publications ==
- Les Aventures de Tchop, 1965
- Cocktail Khorotov, 1989
- SOS Labes, 1990
- Le Balcon de Djamila
- Djurdjurassique bled, 1999
- Rue des petites daurades, novel, 2001
- C'est à Alger, 2002
- Comment réussir un bon petit couscous, 2003
- Le Dernier chameau
- L'Allumeur de Rêves Berbères, 2007
- Tous les Algériens sont des mécaniciens, 2009

== Filmography ==
- 1983: Liberté, la nuit, by Philippe Garrel
- 1986: Sombrero by Rabah Boubras
- 1988: El Khamsa by Belkacem Hadjadj
- 1989: Hassan Niya
- 1989: « Lumières « by Jean-Pierre Llido
- 1990: De Hollywood à Tamanrasset
- 1998: Le Gone du Chaâba, by Christophe Ruggia
- 2001: Inch'Allah dimanche, by Yamina Benguigui
- 2002: Fleurs de sang, by Myriam Mézières
- 2003: Momo mambo, by Laïla Marrakchi
- 2005: Voisins, voisines, by Malik Chibane
- 2005: Rue des figuiers, by Yasmina Yahiaoui
- 2006: Michou d'Auber, by Thomas Gilou
- 2007: L'Ennemi intime, by Florent Emilio Siri
- 2009: The Barons
- 2010: Top Floor, Left Wing
- 2010: Bacon on the Side
- 2011: The Rabbi's Cat, by Joann Sfar
- 2011: Monsieur Lazhar, by Philippe Falardeau
- 2012: Zarafa by Rémi Bezançon and Jean-Christophe Lie
- 2012: What the Day Owes the Night, by Alexandre Arcady
