= Social Hygiene =

- French: Hygiène sociale
- Directed by: Denis Côté
- Written by: Denis Côté
- Produced by: Denis Côté; Andreas Mendritzki; Annie St-Pierre; Aonan Yang
- Starring: Maxim Gaudette; Larissa Corriveau; Évelyne Rompré
- Cinematography: François Messier-Rheault
- Edited by: Nicolas Roy
- Music by: Lebanon Hanover
- Production companies: GreenGround Productions; Inspiratrice et Commandant
- Release date: March 2, 2021 (Berlin)
- Running time: 75 minutes
- Country: Canada
- Language: French
- Box office: $911

Social Hygiene (French: Hygiène sociale) is a Canadian comedy film, directed by Denis Côté and released in 2021. The film stars Maxim Gaudette as Antonin, a petty thief who is confronted by five different women — his sister Solveig (Larissa Corriveau), his wife Eglantine (Évelyne Rompré), his love interest Cassiopée (Ève Duranceau), a tax inspector (Kathleen Fortin) and theft victim Aurore (Éléonore Loiselle) — about the need to get his life back on track.

The film's trailer, released in February 2021, consists entirely of footage of the main cast in period dress, standing some distance apart in a field without any spoken dialogue. Although the actual film does feature dialogue, it does unfold largely with the actors standing at significant distance from each other and being shot with a fixed-location camera. Côté has noted, however, that while this complies with the social distancing requirements during the COVID-19 pandemic, the film had actually been written before such restrictions were imposed; he has, however, acknowledged that he had considered the script incomplete and not ready to enter production, and decided to make the film only after Corriveau convinced him that the production limitations imposed by the pandemic made it viable.

The film premiered in the Encounters program at the 2021 Berlin Film Festival, where Côté was cowinner of the award for Best Director in the program alongside Ramon Zürcher and Silvan Zürcher for The Girl and the Spider. The film had its Canadian premiere at the Rendez-vous Québec Cinéma, before opening commercially in May.

== Cast ==
- Larissa Corriveau as Solveig
- Maxim Gaudette as Antonin
- Evelyne Rompré as Eglantine
- Kathleen Fortin as Rose
- Eve Duranceau as Cassiopée
- Éléonore Loiselle as Aurore
