= The Train (2025 film) =

2025 Canadian drama film

- French: Le Train
- Directed by: Marie Brassard
- Written by: Marie Brassard
- Produced by: Catherine Chagnon
- Starring: Thalie Rhainds; Electra Codina Morelli; Larissa Corriveau; Lenni-Kim
- Cinematography: Mathieu Laverdière
- Edited by: Amélie Labrèche
- Music by: Alexander Macsween
- Production company: Microclimat Films
- Distributed by: Axia Films
- Release date: October 18, 2025 (FNC)
- Running time: 105 minutes
- Country: Canada
- Language: English

The Train (French: Le Train) is a Canadian drama film, directed by Marie Brassard and slated for release in 2025. Brassard's filmmaking debut after a long and distinguished career as a playwright and theatre director, the film centres on Agathe, a girl with asthma growing up in Quebec in the 1960s and 1970s with her mother Thérèse, whose life is transformed when she meets Frank, a writer who opens up surprising new possibilities for Agathe's future.

The cast includes Thalie Rhainds as Agathe in childhood, Electra Codina Morelli as Agathe in her teen years, Larissa Corriveau as Thérèse, and Lenni-Kim as Frank, as well as Jacques Nicolini, Christopher Heyerdahl, Luc Proulx, Maxim Gaudette, Philomène Bilodeau and Anna Tamura in supporting roles.

The film was shot in spring 2024 in Montreal, Quebec.

The film is slated to premiere as the closing gala of the 2025 Festival du nouveau cinéma.

The film was shortlisted for the 2025 Jean-Marc Vallée DGC Discovery Award.

== Cast ==
- Larissa Corriveau as Thérèse
- Thalie Rhainds as Agathe enfant
- Électra Kiara Codina as Agathe adolescente
- Jacques Nicolini as Maurice
- Lennikim as Frank
- Luc Proulx as Le docteur
- Philomène Bilodeau as Actrice
