= Émilien Néron =

Canadian actor

- Born: December 28, 1998 (age 27)
- Occupation: Actor

Émilien Néron (born December 28, 1998) is a Canadian actor from Longueuil, Quebec. He is most noted for his performance as Simon in the 2011 film Monsieur Lazhar, for which he won the Jutra Award for Best Supporting Actor at the 14th Jutra Awards in 2012.

He has also appeared in the films The Canadiens, Forever (Pour toujours, les Canadiens!) and Midsummer's Dream, and the television series Tactik, Les Parent, 30 vies, 19-2 and Karl & Max: Été 84. He also voiced the lead role of Norman in the French dubbed version of ParaNorman.
