= Martin Laroche (director) =

Canadian film director and screenwriter

Martin Laroche is a Canadian film director and screenwriter from Quebec. He is most noted for his 2012 film Fair Sex (Les Manèges humains), which received four Jutra Award nominations at the 16th Jutra Awards in 2014 including a nod for Laroche in the Best Screenplay category.

Originally from Victoriaville, Quebec, he is a film studies graduate of the Université du Québec à Montréal. He wrote and directed his debut feature film, La logique du remords, in 2007, and followed up with Modernaire in 2009.

Since Fair Sex, he has also directed the films Tadoussac in 2017 and Laughter (Le Rire) in 2020.
