= The Three Madeleines =

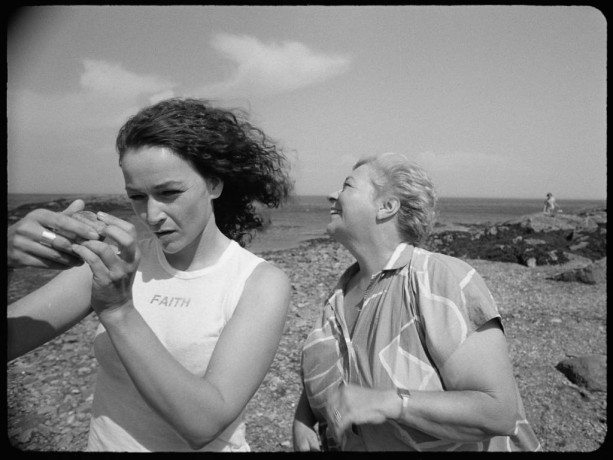
- Sylvie Drapeau and France Arbour in The Three Madeleines
- French: Les fantômes des trois Madeleines
- Directed by: Guylaine Dionne
- Written by: Guylaine Dionne; Claire Valade
- Produced by: Guylaine Dionne; Francois Landry; Michel Mosca
- Starring: Sylvie Drapeau; France Arbour; Isadora Galwey
- Cinematography: Nathalie Moliavko-Visotzky
- Edited by: Aube Foglia
- Production companies: Filmo; France Film
- Distributed by: Equinoxe Films
- Release date: May 2000 (Cannes)
- Running time: 82 minutes
- Country: Canada
- Language: French

The Three Madeleines (French: Les fantômes des trois Madeleines) is a Canadian drama film, directed by Guylaine Dionne and released in 2000. The film centres on a road trip undertaken by Marie-Madeleine (Sylvie Drapeau) with Mado (France Arbour), her birth mother with whom she has recently been reunited after being given up for adoption in infancy, and Madeleine (Isadora Galwey), Marie-Madeleine's young daughter.

The cast also includes Kathleen Fortin, Maxim Gaudette, Isabelle Blais, Monique Joly, Luc Proulx, Jean-Guy Bouchard, Patrick Goyette, Maxine Visotzky-Charlebois, Christopher Schmitz, Erhardt Schmitz, Anne-Marie Provencher, Micheline Bernard, Molly Garland, Emilie Gélinas-Noble and Charlotte Hoffmann-Archenault in supporting roles.

The film premiered in the Directors Fortnight program at the 2000 Cannes Film Festival.

== Awards ==
Nathalie Moliavko-Visotzky received a Jutra Award nomination for Best Cinematography at the 3rd Jutra Awards in 2001.
