= Top Floor, Left Wing =

- Directed by: Angelo Cianci
- Written by: Angelo Cianci
- Produced by: Peter Kassovitz
- Starring: Hippolyte Girardot, Fellag, and Aymen Saidi
- Cinematography: Laurent Brunet
- Edited by: Raphaele Urtin
- Music by: Jørgen Lauritsen
- Distributed by: Memento Films Dist.
- Release date: November 17, 2010
- Running time: 125 minutes
- Country: France
- Language: French

Top Floor, Left Wing (Dernier étage, gauche, gauche) is a 2010 French comedy film. It won the Panorama FIPRESCI Award at the Berlin International Film Festival in 2011.

== Plot ==
Three men in a banlieue are mistaken for terrorists and get targeted by a French SWAT team.

== Cast ==
- Hippolyte Girardot as François Echeveria
- Mohamed Fellag as Mohand Atelhadj
- Aymen Saïdi as Salem (Akli) Atelhadj
- Lyes Salem as Hamza Barrida
- Thierry Godard as Commandant Villard
- Michel Vuillermoz as the prefect
- Judith Henry as Anna Echeveria
- Julie-Anne Roth as Lieutenant Saroyan
