= Another House =

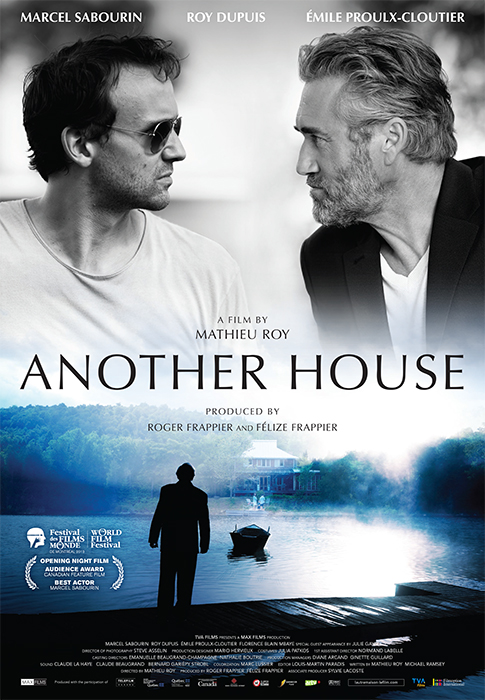
- Poster of the movie
- French: L'autre maison
- Directed by: Mathieu Roy
- Written by: Mathieu Roy; Michael Ramsey
- Produced by: Roger Frappier; Félize Frappier
- Starring: Roy Dupuis; Émile Proulx-Cloutier; Marcel Sabourin
- Cinematography: Steve Asselin
- Edited by: Louis-Martin Paradis
- Production company: Maxfilms Productions
- Distributed by: TVA Films
- Release date: August 22, 2013 (MWFF)
- Running time: 100 minutes
- Country: Canada
- Language: French

Another House (French: L'autre maison) is a Canadian drama film, directed by Mathieu Roy and released in 2013. The film stars Roy Dupuis and Émile Proulx-Cloutier as Gabriel and Éric Bernard, estranged brothers struggling to cope with their father Henri's (Marcel Sabourin) worsening Alzheimer's disease.

The cast also includes Julie Gayet as Gabriel's girlfriend Charlotte, Florence Blain Mbaye as Éric's girlfriend Maia, and Évelyne de la Chenelière as their cousin Sylvie.

Sabourin received the Best Actor award at the Montreal World Film Festival for his performance, and a Jutra Award nomination for Best Actor at the 16th Jutra Awards. Blain Mbaye received a Canadian Screen Award nomination for Best Supporting Actress at the 2nd Canadian Screen Awards.
