= Isaka Sawadogo =

Burkinabé actor (born 1966)

- Born: 1966 (age 59–60); Burkina Faso
- Occupation: Actor
- Notable work: Night of the Kings

Isaka Sawadogo (born 1966), sometimes credited as Issaka Sawadogo, is a Burkinabé actor.

== Career ==
He is most noted for his performances in the Canadian film Diego Star, for which he received a Prix Jutra nomination for Best Actor at the 16th Jutra Awards in 2014, and the Dutch film The Paradise Suite, for which he won the Golden Calf for Best Actor at the 2016 Netherlands Film Festival.

In 2020, he appeared in a supporting role in Philippe Lacôte's film Night of the Kings (La Nuit des rois). He has also starred in Ousmane (2021), Io Capitano (2023) and Time Out (2023).
