= On Earth as in Heaven =

- French: Sur la terre comme au ciel
- Directed by: Nathalie Saint-Pierre
- Written by: Nathalie Saint-Pierre; Marika Lhoumeau
- Produced by: Nicolas Comeau
- Starring: Lou Thompson; Philomène Bilodeau; Édith Cochrane
- Cinematography: Nathalie Moliavko-Visotzky
- Edited by: Nathalie Saint-Pierre
- Production company: Extérieur Nuit
- Distributed by: Axia Films
- Release date: November 3, 2023 (Cinemania)
- Running time: 118 minutes
- Country: Canada
- Language: French

On Earth as in Heaven (French: Sur la terre comme au ciel) is a Canadian drama film, directed by Nathalie Saint-Pierre and released in 2023. The film stars Lou Thompson as Clara, a young girl being raised in an isolated Christian fundamentalist cult compound; after her older sister Sarah (Philomène Bilodeau) runs away from the community, Clara goes to Montreal to find her, staying with her aunt Louise (Édith Cochrane) and learning about the world in ways she was never exposed to by her parents.

The cast also includes Édith Dandenault, Jean Drolet, Jérémie Verrette, Antoine Archambault, Dominik Dagenais, Alexandrine Agostini and Cédric Egain.

The film premiered in November 2023 at Cinemania, and had its U.S. premiere at the 39th Santa Barbara International Film Festival. It is slated to go into commercial release in April 2024.

== Awards ==
The film won the award for Best Youth Film at the 2024 BUFF International Film Festival in Malmö, Sweden, and a special jury prize for youth films at the 2024 Zlín Film Festival.
