= Frédérique Paré =

Canadian actress

Frédérique Paré is a Canadian actress from Saint-Denis-de-Brompton, Quebec. She is most noted for her role as Manu in the 2012 film Catimini, for which she received a Jutra Award nomination for Best Supporting Actress at the 16th Jutra Awards in 2014.

She had her first-ever acting role in the television series Virginie, and subsequently appeared in the television series Un tueur si proche, Le berceau des anges and Police scientifique.
