= Catimini =

- Film poster
- Directed by: Nathalie Saint-Pierre
- Written by: Nathalie Saint-Pierre
- Produced by: Nicolas Comeau; Nathalie Saint-Pierre
- Starring: Émilie Bierre; Joyce-Tamara Hall; Rosine Chouinard-Chauveau; Frédérique Paré
- Cinematography: Nathalie Moliavko-Visotzky
- Edited by: Nathalie Saint-Pierre
- Production companies: Société Radio-Canada; Super Écran
- Distributed by: Axia Films
- Release date: August 24, 2012 (Angoulême)
- Running time: 111 minutes
- Country: Canada
- Language: French

Catimini is a Canadian drama film, directed by Nathalie Saint-Pierre and released in 2012. The film tells the stories of four young girls living as wards of the provincial child protection department.

The cast includes Émilie Bierre as Cathy, Joyce-Tamara Hall as Kayla, Rosine Chouinard-Chauveau as Mégane, Frédérique Paré as Manu, Isabelle Vincent as Réjanne, and Roger La Rue as Raynald.

Brendan Kelly of the Montreal Gazette singled out the performances of the four main child actors for praise, writing that "the four young actors playing the girls are all amazing, so good that you'll be forgiven for thinking Saint-Pierre actually went and cast real kids from the youth protection world, which she did not."

The film premiered on August 24, 2012 at the Angoulême Francophone Film Festival, before premiering commercially in January 2013.

== Awards ==
Award	Date of ceremony	Category	Nominees	Result	Reference
Jutra Awards	March 23, 2014	Best Film	Nicolas Comeau, Nathalie Saint-Pierre	Nominated	
Jutra Awards	March 23, 2014	Best Supporting Actress	Frédérique Paré	Nominated	
Jutra Awards	March 23, 2014	Best Screenplay	Nathalie Saint-Pierre	Nominated	
Jutra Awards	March 23, 2014	Best Cinematography	Nathalie Moliavko-Visotzky	Nominated	
Jutra Awards	March 23, 2014	Best Editing	Nathalie Saint-Pierre	Nominated	
