= Maxim Gaudette =

Canadian actor

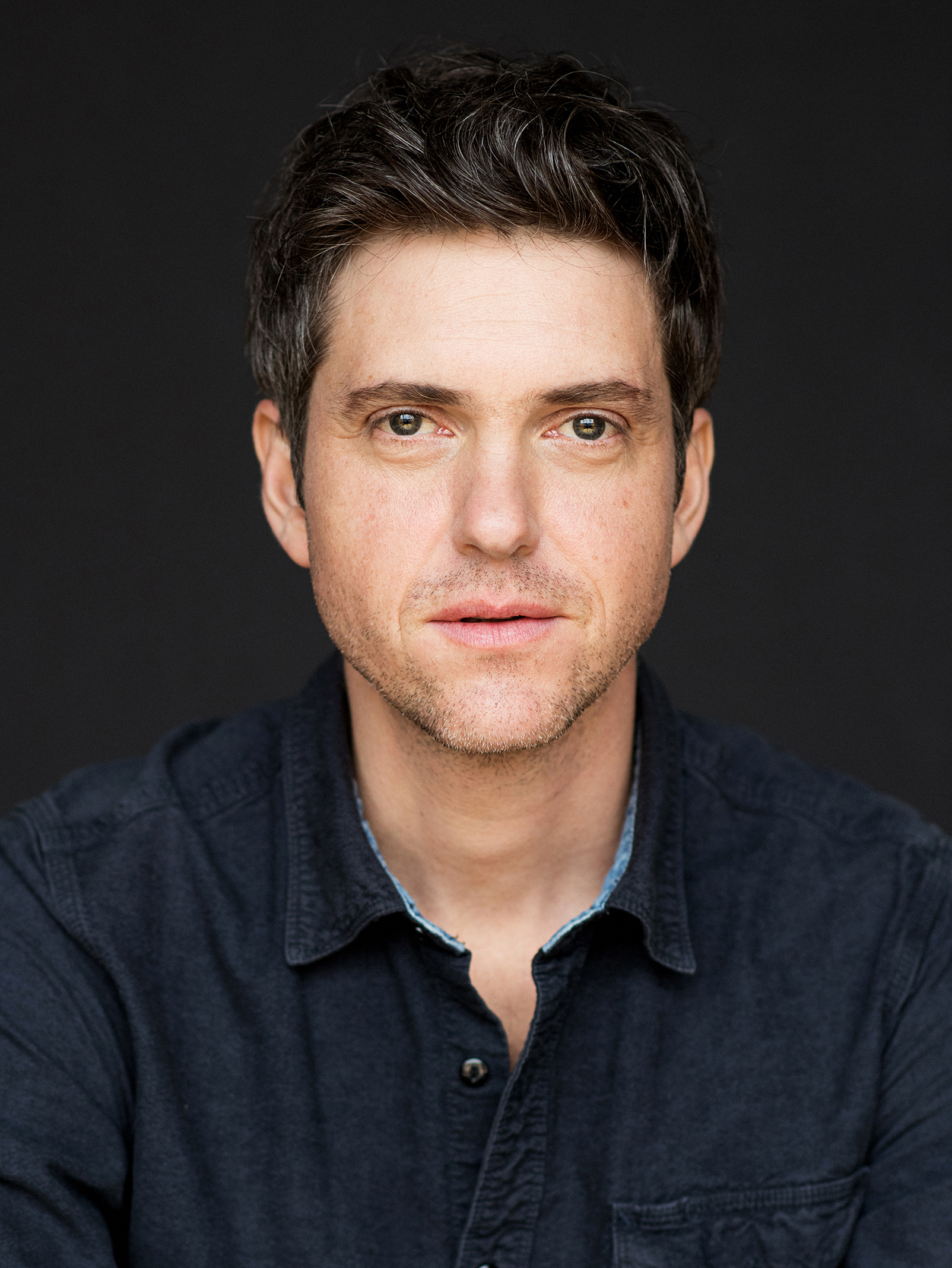
- Born: June 8, 1974 (age 52); Sherbrooke, Quebec
- Education: Conservatoire d'art dramatique de Montréal
- Occupation: Actor
- Years active: 1996–present
- Partner: Larissa Corriveau
- Father: André Gaudette

Maxim Gaudette (born June 8, 1974) is a Canadian actor from Quebec. He won both the Genie Award for Best Supporting Actor and the Jutra Award for Best Supporting Actor in 2010 for his role as Marc Lépine in the 2009 film Polytechnique.

== Life ==
Originally from Sherbrooke, he is the son of former hockey player André Gaudette. He graduated from the Conservatoire d'art dramatique de Montréal in 1997. He has acted in television, film, and stage roles.

He is in a relationship with actress Larissa Corriveau. In April 2019, the couple had their first child, a girl. He also is father to two sons from a previous relationship .

== Filmography ==
=== Film ===
- 2 Seconds — 1998
- The Three Madeleines (Les fantômes des trois Madeleines) — 2000
- L'Espérance — 2004
- Without Her (Sans elle) - 2006
- Cheech — 2006
- The 3 L'il Pigs (Les 3 p'tits cochons) — 2007
- Honey, I'm in Love (Le grand départ) — 2008
- Polytechnique — 2009
- Incendies — 2010
- Lac Mystère — 2013
- Our Loved Ones (Nos ëtres chers) — 2015
- 9 (9, le film) — 2016
- Social Hygiene (Hygiène sociale) — 2021
- Confessions of a Hitman (Confessions) — 2021
- Echo to Delta (Écho à Delta) — 2023
- Measures for a Funeral — 2024
- The Train (Le Train) — 2025
- The Parking Spot (La Place) - 2026
- Redemptions (Rédemptions) - 2026

=== Television ===
- Virginie (1996-2010)
- L'ombre de l'épervier (1997)
- Si la tendence se maintient (2001)
- Fortier (2001)
- L'héritière de grande ourse (2005)
- Lance et compte (2004-2009)
- Les Rescapés (2010-2012)
- L'auberge du chien noir (2012-2013)
- Trauma (2013)
