= The River's Lazy Flow =

2013 film by Alisi Telengut

- French: Le courant faible de la rivière
- Directed by: Joël Vaudreuil
- Written by: Joël Vaudreuil
- Produced by: David Pierrat
- Cinematography: Joël Vaudreuil
- Edited by: Joël Vaudreuil
- Music by: Joël Vaudreuil
- Animation by: Joël Vaudreuil; Nicolas Moussette
- Distributed by: Travelling Distribution
- Release date: June 2013 (Annecy)
- Running time: 9 minutes
- Country: Canada

The River's Lazy Flow (French: Le courant faible de la rivière) is a Canadian animated short film, directed by Joël Vaudreuil and released in 2013. The film centres on an older man who is at a river cabin with his family, and begins to reminisce about his teenage experience when he had a crush on a girl for the first time.

The film premiered at the 2013 Annecy International Animation Film Festival, and was screened at the 2013 Sommets du cinéma d'animation.

The film won the Jutra Award for Best Animated Short Film at the 16th Jutra Awards in 2014.
