= Marjorie Rhéaume =

- Occupations: Production designer Art director

Marjorie Rhéaume is a Canadian film art director and production designer.

She is from Quebec. In 2013, she was the production designer for Before My Heart Falls, with cinematographer Nicolas Bolduc. In 2014, she was nominated for the Jutra Award for Best Art Direction for the film Diego Star.

For director Simon Lavoie, Rhéaume worked on the film The Little Girl Who Was Too Fond of Matches in 2016 in Montreal and the Laurentides. With cinematographer Nicolas Canniccioni, she selected colours in designing the set, mindful of the black-and-white Red Epic Monochrome 6K photography. She was nominated for the Canadian Screen Award for Best Art Direction/Production Design.

== Filmography ==
Her films include:

- Curling (2010)
- 2 temps, 3 mouvements (2014)
- The Demons (2015)
