= Triptych (film) =

2013 film

- French: Triptyque
- Directed by: Robert Lepage; Pedro Pires
- Written by: Robert Lepage
- Produced by: Lynda Beaulieu
- Starring: Frédérike Bédard; Lise Castonguay
- Cinematography: Pedro Pires
- Edited by: Aube Foglia; Pedro Pires
- Production company: Productions du 8e art
- Distributed by: Christal Films
- Release date: 6 September 2013 (TIFF)
- Running time: 90 minutes
- Country: Canada
- Language: French

Triptych (French: Triptyque) is a 2013 Canadian drama film directed by Robert Lepage and Pedro Pires. Adapted from Lepage's theatrical play Lipsynch, the film centres on Michelle (Lise Castonguay), a woman who has just been released from the hospital following a diagnosis with schizophrenia, and her sister Marie (Frédérike Bédard), a singer and actress who is herself recovering from brain surgery that has left her temporarily unable to speak.

The film had its theatrical premiere on 6 September 2013 at the 2013 Toronto International Film Festival, and was later shown in the Panorama section of the 64th Berlin International Film Festival.

The film received two Canadian Screen Award nominations at the 2nd Canadian Screen Awards in 2014, for Best Director (Lepage, Pires) and Best Adapted Screenplay (Lepage), and four Jutra Award nominations at the 16th Jutra Awards, for Best Director (Lepage, Pires), Best Actress (Castonguay), Best Art Direction (Jean Babin, Christian Légaré and David Pelletier) and Best Costume Design (Judy Jonker).

== Cast ==
- Frédérike Bédard as Marie Lavallée
- Lise Castonguay as Michelle Lavallée
- Hans Piesbergen as Thomas Bruckner
- Rebecca Blankenship as Ada Weber
- Aube Foglia as Whispering
- Marie-Ginette Guay as Social worker
- Michel Nadeau as Psychiatrist
- Eliot Laprise as Guillaume
