= André Gaudette =

Canadian ice hockey player

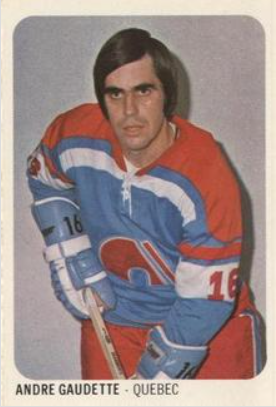
- Gaudette in 1973 card
- Born: December 16, 1947 (age 78) Sherbrooke, Quebec, Canada
- Height: 5 ft 7 in (170 cm)
- Weight: 155 lb (70 kg; 11 st 1 lb)
- Position: Centre
- Shot: Left
- Played for: Quebec Nordiques
- Playing career: 1967–1975

André Gaudette (born December 16, 1947) is a Canadian retired professional ice hockey forward who played 222 games in the World Hockey Association for the Quebec Nordiques. He is the father of actor Maxim Gaudette.

== Career statistics ==
=== Regular season and playoffs ===
			Regular season					Playoffs
Season	Team	League	GP	G	A	Pts	PIM	GP	G	A	Pts	PIM
1964–65	Ile-Jesus Junior	MMJHL	31	5	5	10	28	—	—	—	—	—
1966–67	Thetford Mines Canadiens	QJAHL	45	26	52	78	28	—	—	—	—	—
1967–68	Montreal Junior Canadiens	OHA	54	30	60	90	47	—	—	—	—	—
1968–69	Amarillo Wranglers	CHL	68	13	39	52	15	—	—	—	—	—
1968–69	Quebec Aces	AHL	—	—	—	—	—	9	0	1	1	0
1969–70	Quebec Aces	AHL	71	13	22	35	16	6	2	5	7	0
1970–71	Quebec Aces	AHL	72	20	30	50	48	1	0	1	1	0
1971–72	Richmond Robins	AHL	74	17	31	48	30	—	—	—	—	—
1972–73	Quebec Nordiques	WHA	77	27	44	71	12	—	—	—	—	—
1973–74	Quebec Nordiques	WHA	78	24	44	68	16	—	—	—	—	—
1974–75	Quebec Nordiques	WHA	67	10	17	27	6	9	0	1	1	0
WHA totals			222	61	105	166	34	9	0	1	1	0
