= Guylaine Dionne =

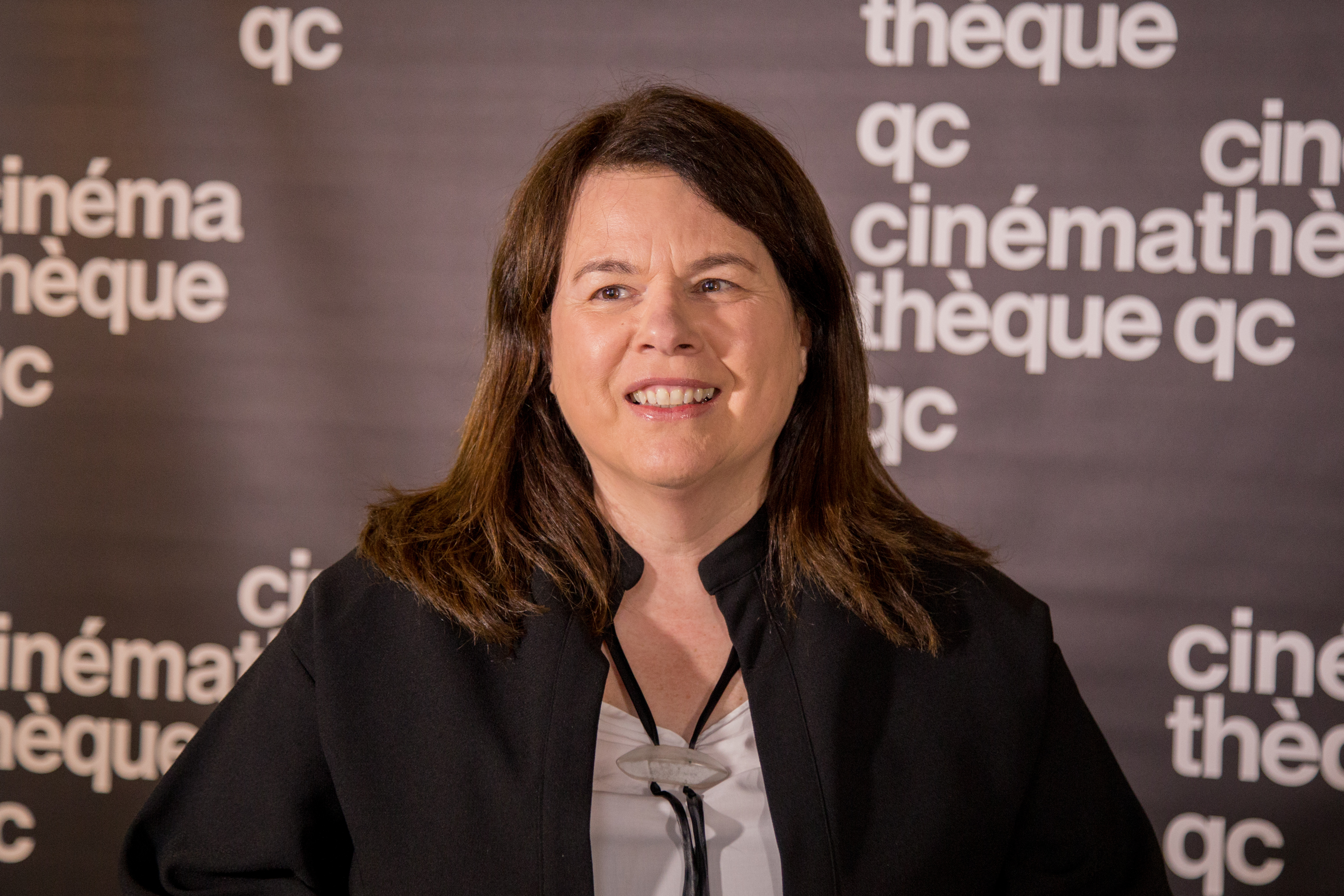
- Dionne in 2018
- Born: 1962 (age 63–64); Saint-Pascal, Quebec, Canada
- Occupations: Film director; producer; screenwriter; professor
- Notable work: The Three Madeleines, Waitresses Wanted

Guylaine Dionne (born 1962) is a Canadian filmmaker and screenwriter from Quebec, most noted as director of the feature films The Three Madeleines (Les Fantômes des trois Madeleine) and Waitresses Wanted (Serveuses demandées).

After graduating from the film studies program at Concordia University in Montreal, she began her career making documentaries for Quebec television, before releasing The Three Madeleines as her debut feature. The film premiered in the Directors Fortnight program at the 2000 Cannes Film Festival.

In 2018, Dionne and Rosanna Maule collaborated on Les Réalisatrices contemporaines : l'état des choses, a documentary about the history of women in film. Her most recent film, the documentary Jazz Club Owner, was released in 2021.

She is now a professor in the film studies program at Concordia.

== Awards ==
In 2006, she was the recipient of the Don Haig Award at the Hot Docs Canadian International Documentary Festival.

== Filmography ==
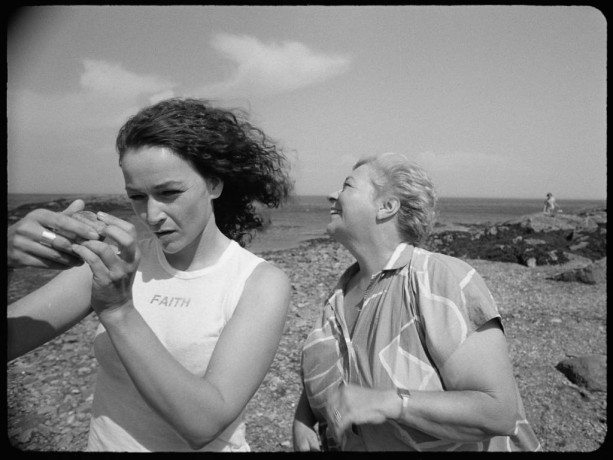
Sylvie Drapeau and France Arbour in The Three Madeleines by Guylaine Dionne (2000)

=== Film ===
- 1988 – Last Call
- 1989 – Les Frissons d'Agathe
- 2000 – The Three Madeleines (Les Fantômes des trois Madeleine)
- 2008 – Waitresses Wanted (Serveuses demandées)
- 2010 – Les Mercredis de Rose
- 2018 – Les Réalisatrices contemporaines : l'état des choses
- 2021 – Jazz Club Owner

=== Television ===
- 1991–1993 – Amériques 500 : À la redécouverte du nouveau monde
- 1994 – Les Rêves secrets des Tarahumaras d'elle-même
- 1998–1999 – Îles d'Inspiration
- 1999–2000 – Les Histoires Oubliées
- 2000 – Through her Eyes
- 2004 – Mary Shelley
