= Thomas Hellman =

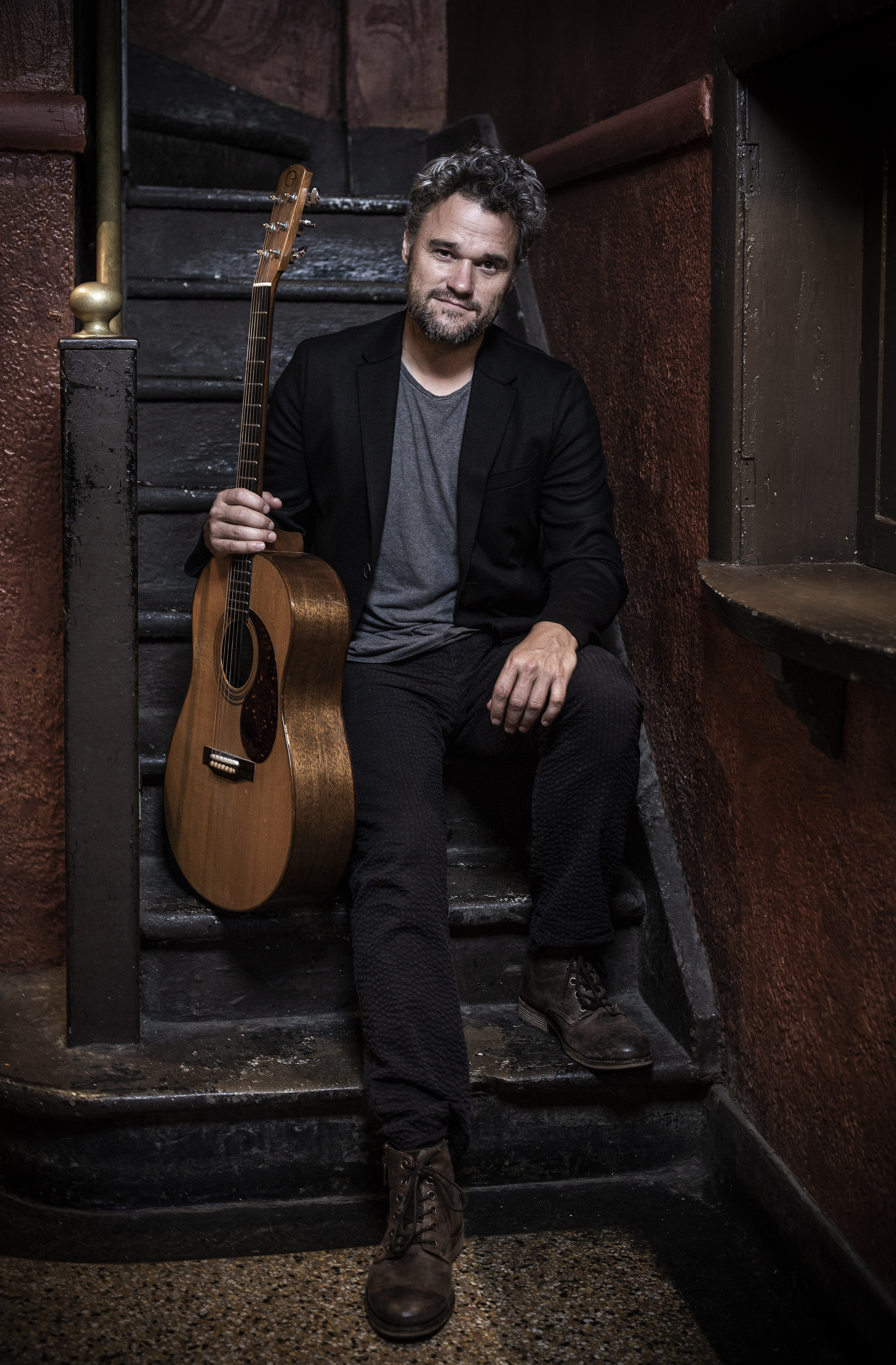

Background information
- Born: 1975 (age 50–51); Canada
- Genres: Blues, Gospel, Folk
- Occupations: Singer, songwriter, radio columnist, and author
- Website: http://thomashellman.com

Thomas Hellman (born 1975) is a Canadian singer, songwriter, radio columnist, and author. Born to an American father and a French mother, he sings both in French and English.

== Music and writing ==
Hellman's M.A thesis in French literature in McGill University explored the subject of bilingualism, creativity and identity in the works of Samuel Beckett.

Hellman has released seven albums. He writes a literary column for Radio-Canada. He has published essays on music, literature and identity in several French Canadian literary reviews, including Liberté, L’inconvénient and Moebius.

In 2013, he released an illustrated book-cd Thomas Hellman chante Roland Giguère, with 13 poems by Quebec poet and visual artist Roland Giguere, that Hellman put to music. This work was awarded a Coup de coeur from the Académie Charles Cros in France. Thomas, then, with the help of director Brigitte Haentjens, put together a show with these songs and other literary texts set to music.

Hellman’s most recent show, Rêves américains, de la ruée vers l’or à la grande crise, explores North American history, from the gold rush to the Great Depression, through venerable old folk songs, literary texts put to music (HD Thoreau, J. Steinbeck, Frank H Mayer), and his own texts. It is part theater, part story-telling, part musical concert and has been performed in music festivals, theaters, as well as in literary festivals in Canada and Europe, with musicians Olaf Gundel and Sage Reynolds.

Thomas has also composed music for film and theater. He was nominated for a prix Jutra for Best original composition for Martin Laroche’s film Fair sex (les manèges humains).

He has also contributed as a singer on several children’s albums and shows with the company La montagne secrete/ The secret mountain. He regularly gives musically illustrated lectures in colleges, universities and literary events in French Canada and Europe.

== Radio ==
Thomas Hellman is a radio columnist for Radio-Canada, the French arm of the CBC. In 2010, he created a series of 10 columns for the show Éclectique, during a nine-month residency at the Cité des arts de Paris. This series -part story-telling, part musical performance- marked the beginning of his career in radio, which included his becoming a book reviewer on Christiane Charette. He made a series of 30 pieces on the history of American music during the Great Depression for La tête ailleurs between 2011 and 2013. This series inspired his most recent album and show Rêves américains, de la ruée vers l’or à la grande crise. Thomas has also been doing a regular column on the literary show Plus on est de fous plus on lit in which he explores classical literary works, in relation to current events. Thomas has also collaborated with English CBC. In 2012, he did a series called Ten essential books for the popular English radio show Cinq à six, hosted by Jeanette Kelly: he introduced the audience to what he considered to be ten essential books of French Canadian literature.

== Awards ==
Thomas Hellman won the prix des diffuseurs européens SODEC-RIDEAU in 2017, the prix OFQJ-Rideau in 2014, the Prix Miroir in 2006, the Prix Félix-Leclerc de la chanson in 2007, the prix Coup de cœur de l’Académie Charles-Cros in 2007, and again in 2013.

== Discography ==
- Rêves américains, tome 2 : La Grande Crise - 2018
- Rêves américains, tome 1 : La ruée vers l’or - 2015
- Thomas Hellman chante Roland Giguère - 2012
- Prêts, partez - 2008
- Departure Song - 2007
- L'Appartement - 2005
- Stories from Oscar’s Old Café - 2002
- Something Wrong - 1998
