= When Adam Changes =

2023 Canadian animated film

- French: Adam change lentement
- Directed by: Joël Vaudreuil
- Written by: Joël Vaudreuil
- Produced by: David Pierrat; Olivier Picard
- Starring: Simon Lacroix
- Edited by: Joël Vaudreuil
- Music by: Joël Vaudreuil
- Animation by: Nicolas Moussette; Hristo Karastoyanov
- Production company: Parce Que Films
- Release date: June 12, 2023 (Annecy)
- Running time: 96 minutes
- Country: Canada
- Language: French

When Adam Changes (French: Adam change lentement, lit. "Adam Changes Slowly") is a Canadian animated comedy-drama feature film, directed by Joël Vaudreuil and released in 2023. The film centres on Adam (Simon Lacroix), an impressionable teenager growing up in smalltown Quebec who has the unusual quirk that each time somebody makes a comment about his body, whether fair or unfair, his body actually changes to match the comment.

The voice cast also includes Noémie O'Farrell, Sophie Desmarais, Marc Beaupré, Isabelle Brouillette, Antoine Vézina, Julianne Côté, Fabien Cloutier, Alexis Lefebvre, Sophie Cadieux and Gaston Lepage.

== Distribution ==
An excerpt from the film was screened as a work in progress at the 2022 Sommets du cinéma d'animation.

The completed film premiered at the 2023 Annecy International Animation Film Festival. It had its Canadian premiere at the 2023 Ottawa International Animation Festival, and screened in the Northern Lights program at the 2023 Vancouver International Film Festival and the national competition at the 2023 Festival du nouveau cinéma.

The film was commercially released in June 2024.

== Awards ==
The film received a Prix Iris nomination for Best First Film at the 26th Quebec Cinema Awards in 2024.

The film was shortlisted for the 2025 Prix collégial du cinéma québécois.
