= Stéphane Lafleur =

French-Canadian film director, editor, musician (born 1976)

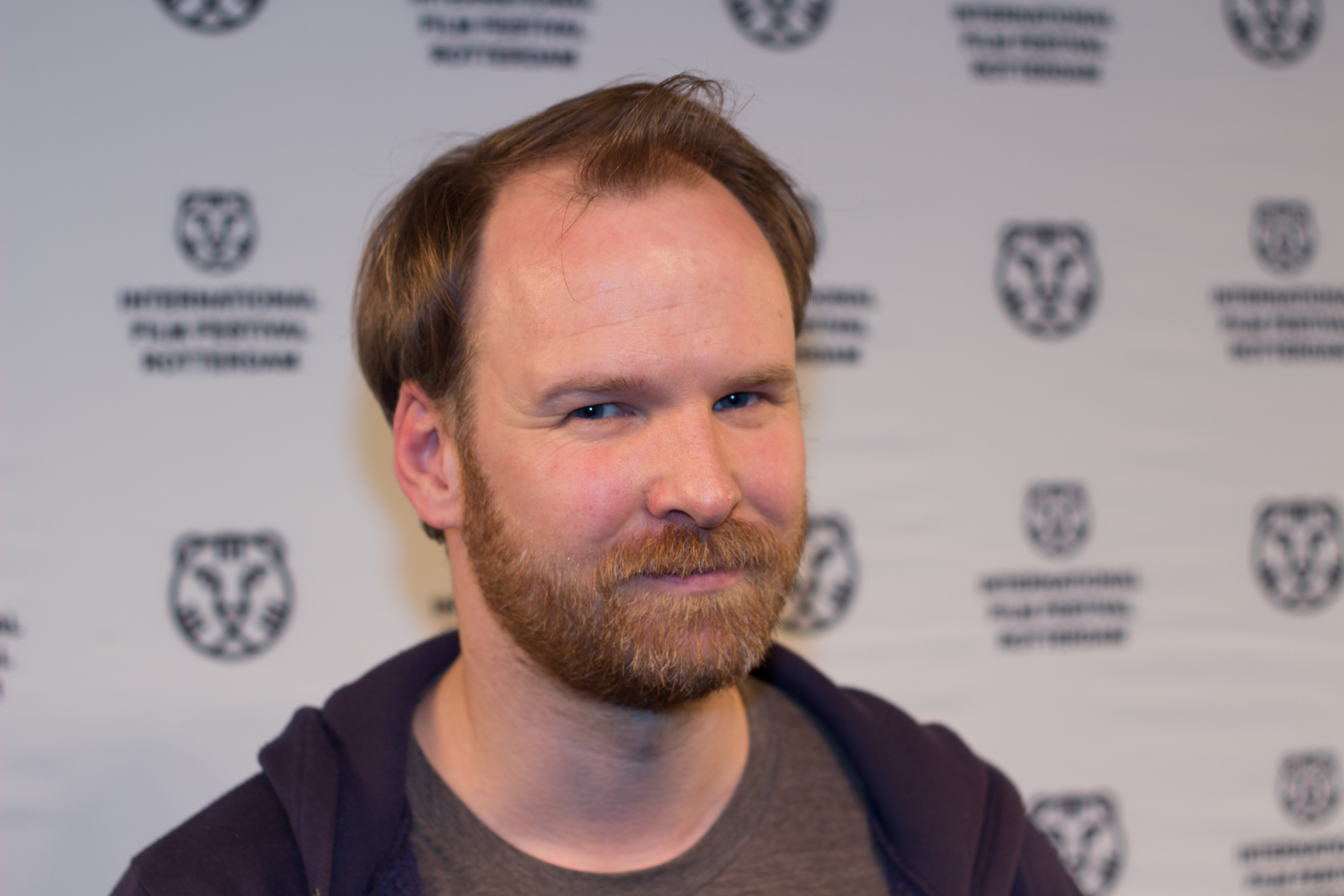
Stéphane Lafleur at the International Film Festival Rotterdam 2015

Stéphane Lafleur introducing himself
recorded January 2015

Stéphane Lafleur (born 1976) is a French-Canadian film director, editor and musician.

== Career ==
Lafleur attended the Université du Québec à Montréal. In 1999, he directed his first short film, Karaoke, which received an honorable mention for the Best Canadian Short Film award at the 1999 Toronto International Film Festival. He released his second short film, Snooze, in 2002.

In 2007, he directed his first feature film, Continental, a Film Without Guns (Continental, un film sans fusil), which premiered at the Venice Film Festival. The film won the Jutra Award for direction and screenwriting as well as the Best Canadian First Feature at TIFF.

His second film, Familiar Grounds (En terrains connus), was released in 2011. In the same year, he collaborated with musicians Andre Ethier, Mathieu Charbonneau and Rebecca Foon on Prince Albert, a short film released as part of the National Parks Project.

His third feature film, You're Sleeping Nicole (Tu dors Nicole), premiered at the 2014 Cannes Film Festival.

As an editor, he won the Genie Award for Best Achievement in Editing in 2011 for Monsieur Lazhar.

As a musician, he is a member of the folk-rock band Avec pas d'casque.

In 2015 he was the patron and curator of the Festival Vues dans la tête de... film festival in Rivière-du-Loup.

== Filmography ==
=== As director ===
- 1999 - Karaoke (short)
- 2002 - Snooze (short)
- 2007 - Continental, a Film Without Guns (Continental, un film sans fusil)
- 2011 - Familiar Grounds (En terrains connus)
- 2011 - Prince Albert (short)
- 2014 - You're Sleeping Nicole (Tu dors Nicole)
- 2022 - Viking

=== As writer ===
- 2007 - Continental, a Film Without Guns (Continental, un film sans fusil)
- 2011 - Familiar Grounds (En terrains connus)
- 2014 - You're Sleeping, Nicole (Tu dors Nicole)

=== As film editor ===
- 2003 - Me Bob Robert
- 2005 - Peter and the Penny
- 2008 - Gilles
- 2011 - Monsieur Lazhar
- 2013 - The Dismantling (Le Démantèlement)
- 2015 - O Negative
- 2016 - Mutants
- 2019 - I'll End Up in Jail (Je finirai en prison)
- 2020 - Shooting Star (Comme une comète)
- 2023 - Humanist Vampire Seeking Consenting Suicidal Person (Vampire humaniste cherche suicidaire consentant)
- 2026 - Pauline (Pauline Julien: femme pays)
