= 10th Jutra Awards =

2008 Canadian film awards ceremony

The 10th Jutra Awards were held on March 9, 2008 to honour films made with the participation of the Quebec film industry in 2007.

The 3 L'il Pigs (Les 3 p'tits cochons) lead the ceremony with thirteen nominations, but lost every award. However, it did win the Billet d'or award. The film also became the second to receive five acting nominations and the fourth to receive at least one in every acting category.

Continental, a Film Without Guns (Continental, un film sans fusil) was the night's big winner, winning four awards from seven nominations: Best Film, Best Director, Best Screenplay and Best Supporting Actor for Réal Bossé. Silk swept the four categories it was nominated for.

For Shake Hands with the Devil, Roy Dupuis took home his second Best Actor award, having previously won for Looking for Alexander (Mémoires affectives).

Days of Darkness (L'âge des ténèbres) received six nominations, including the "Big Five" categories. It ended up winning Best Makeup.

Guillaume Lemay-Thivierge became the third performer to receive two acting nominations during the same ceremony, for Best Actor and Best Supporting Actor, although he didn't win either award.

Bon Cop, Bad Cop, who had won two awards the year before, took home the Most Successful Film Outside Quebec award, bringing its total to three awards.

== Winners and nominees ==
Best Film	Best Director
Continental, a Film Without Guns (Continental, un film sans fusil) — Luc Déry, Kim McCraw; Days of Darkness (L'âge des ténèbres) — Denise Robert, Daniel Louis; The 3 L'il Pigs (Les 3 p'tits cochons) — Pierre Gendron, Christian Larouche; Twilight (La brunante) — Jean-Roch Marcotte	Stéphane Lafleur, Continental, a Film Without Guns (Continental, un film sans fusil); Denys Arcand, Days of Darkness (L'âge des ténèbres); Fernand Dansereau, Twilight (La brunante); Bernard Émond, Summit Circle (Contre toute espérance)
Best Actor	Best Actress
Roy Dupuis, Shake Hands with the Devil; Marc Labrèche, Days of Darkness (L'âge des ténèbres); Claude Legault, The 3 L'il Pigs (Les 3 p'tits cochons); Guillaume Lemay-Thivierge, Nitro	Guylaine Tremblay, Summit Circle (Contre toute espérance); Sylvie Léonard, Days of Darkness (L'âge des ténèbres); Isabel Richer, The 3 L'il Pigs (Les 3 p'tits cochons); Karine Vanasse, My Daughter, My Angel (Ma fille, mon ange)
Best Supporting Actor	Best Supporting Actress
Réal Bossé, Continental, a Film Without Guns (Continental, un film sans fusil); Emmanuel Bilodeau, Bluff; Paul Doucet, The 3 L'il Pigs (Les 3 p'tits cochons); Guillaume Lemay-Thivierge, The 3 L'il Pigs (Les 3 p'tits cochons)	Laurence Leboeuf, My Daughter, My Angel (Ma fille, mon ange); Suzanne Clément, Twilight (La brunante); Véronique Le Flaguais, Surviving My Mother (Comment survivre à sa mère); Julie Perreault, The 3 L'il Pigs (Les 3 p'tits cochons)
Best Screenplay	Best Documentary
Stéphane Lafleur, Continental, a Film Without Guns (Continental, un film sans fusil); Denys Arcand, Days of Darkness (L'âge des ténèbres); Bernard Émond, Summit Circle (Contre tout espérance); Claude Lalonde and Pierre Lamothe, The 3 L'il Pigs (Les 3 p'tits cochons)	The Invisible Nation (Le peuple invisible) — Richard Desjardins and Robert Monderie; Americano — Carlos Ferrand; The Great Resistance (Au pays des colons) — Denys Desjardins; Up the Yangtze — Yung Chang
Best Live Short	Best Animated Short
Our Jail Is a Kingdom (Notre prison est un royaume) – Simon Galiero; Can You Wave Bye-Bye? — Sarah Galea-Davis; Dust Bowl Ha! Ha! — Sébastien Pilote; The Colony — Jeff Barnaby	Sleeping Betty (Isabelle au bois dormant) – Claude Cloutier; Madame Tutli-Putli — Chris Lavis, Maciek Szczerbowski; Subservience (Révérence) — Patrick Bouchard; The Tourists — Malcolm Sutherland
Best Art Direction	Best Cinematography
François Séguin, Silk; Gilles Aird, The 3 L'il Pigs (Les 3 p'tits cochons); André-Line Beauparlant, Continental, a Film Without Guns (Continental, un film sans fusil); David Pelletier, The Ring (Le ring)	Alain Dostie, Silk; Bruce Chun, Nitro; Bernard Couture, The 3 L'il Pigs (Les 3 p'tits cochons); Sara Mishara, Continental, a Film Without Guns (Continental, un film sans fusil)
Best Costume Design	Best Editing
Carlo Poggioli and Kazuko Kurosawa, Silk; Brigitte Desroches, Twilight (La brunante); Monic Ferland, The 3 L'il Pigs (Les 3 p'tits cochons); Ginette Magny, Surviving My Mother (Comment survivre à sa mère)	Éric Drouin, Nitro; Michel Arcand and Louis Martin-Paradis, Shake Hands with the Devil; Louise Côté, Summit Circle (Contre toute espérance); Sophie Leblond, Continental, a Film Without Guns (Continental, un film sans fusil)
Best Hair	Best Makeup
Réjean Forget, My Aunt Aline (Ma tante Aline); Réjean Goderre, My Daughter, My Angel (Ma fille, mon ange); Johanne Paiement, The 3 L'il Pigs (Les 3 p'tits cochons); Denis Parent, Nitro	Diane Simard, Days of Darkness (L'âge des ténèbres); Kathryn Casault, My Aunt Aline (Ma tante Aline); Johanne Gravel, Nitro; Marlène Rouleau, The 3 L'il Pigs (Les 3 p'tits cochons)
Best Original Music	Best Sound
Catherine Major, The Ring (Le ring); Normand Corbeil, My Daughter, My Angel (Ma fille, mon ange); Stéphane Dufour, The 3 L'il Pigs (Les 3 p'tits cochons); FM Le Sieur, Nitro	Claude La Haye, Claude Beaugrand, Hans Peter Strobl and Bernard Gariépy Strobl, Silk; Pierre Bertrand, Sylvain Bellemare and Bernard Gariépy Strobl, Continental, a Film Without Guns (Continental, un film sans fusil); Simon Poudrette, Taking the Plunge (À vos marques... party!); Patrick Rousseau, Marcel Pothier, Gavin Fernandes and Stéphane Bergeron, My Daughter, My Angel (Ma fille, mon ange)
Special Awards
Jutra Hommage: Jean-Claude Labrecque; Most Successful Film Outside Quebec: Bon Cop, Bad Cop; Billet d'or: The 3 L'il Pigs (Les 3 p'tits cochons)

== Multiple wins and nominations ==
=== Films with multiple nominations ===
Nominations	Film
13	The 3 L'il Pigs (Les 3 p'tits cochons)
7	Continental, a Film Without Guns (Continental, un film sans fusil)
6	Days of Darkness (L'âge des ténèbres)
6	Nitro
5	My Daughter, My Angel (Ma fille, mon ange)
4	Silk
4	Summit Circle (Contre toute espérance)
4	Twilight (La brunante)
2	My Aunt Aline (Ma tante Aline)
2	The Ring (Le ring)
2	Shake Hands with the Devil
2	Surviving My Mother (Comment survivre à sa mère)

=== Films with multiple wins ===
Wins	Film
4	Continental, a Film Without Guns (Continental, un film sans fusil)
4	Silk
