= Suzanne (novel) =

Novel by Anaïs Barbeau-Lavalette

- First edition, French
- Author: Anaïs Barbeau-Lavalette
- Original title: La Femme qui fuit
- Translator: Rhonda Mullins
- Language: French
- Genre: Fiction
- Publisher: Marchand de feuilles, Coach House Books
- Publication date: 2015
- Publication place: Canada
- English publication date: 2017
- Media type: Print, ebook
- Pages: 378 pages
- ISBN: 2923896505 First edition, French

Suzanne (French: La Femme qui fuit) is a 2015 novel by Canadian author Anaïs Barbeau-Lavalette, translated by Rhonda Mullins. The novel is a fictionalized biography of her grandmother, Suzanne Meloche, a poet and painter who interacted with many French-Canadian artists and historical events. Much of the information is based on the findings of a private investigator hired by Barbeau-Lavalette to find information on her grandmother's life. The novel was first released in the French language in Canada through the publishing house Marchand de feuilles during 2015. It received an English translation through Coach House Books, which released it during 2017.

== Themes ==
In discussing Suzanne's life and experiences, the novel explores social change by referencing multiple historical events. The narrator examines how her grandmother was involved in and influenced by these events. Often, the large-scale events presented intertwine with and echo the familial events of the novel itself. The novel is praised for presenting these events in human terms. The novel presents history about Quebec that is often overlooked, allowing a less-considered perspective to be represented in literature.

The story examines the conflicting roles of motherhood and career. Through the life events of Suzanne Meloche, the narrator explores notions of feminism and familial obligation, as Suzanne chooses to leave her children in pursuit of art and personal freedom. While Barbeau-Lavalette expresses her anger at Suzanne and at her decisions through her narration, the narrator also seeks both to explain Suzanne's behavior and to allow the reader to sympathize with her actions.

== Plot summary ==
The novel begins in the present day as the narrator, Anaïs Barbeau-Lavalette, and her mother (Manon Barbeau) discover that Suzanne has died and they are the sole heirs. They visit Suzanne's apartment and find photos, reviews, and poems that will be featured later in the novel.

The novel then shifts to a second-person account of Suzanne's early life. Born into a family impoverished by the Great Depression in Canada, as a teenager, Suzanne is eager to explore life beyond Ottawa. Her desire to explore beyond Ottawa is also inspired by her admiration of Hilda Strike, a Canadian runner that she watched race in the 1932 Olympics. Having cultivated her gift for writing and public speaking, she uses her gift to garner attention and then joins a group of avant-garde artists including the writer Claude Gauvreau and the painter Marcel Barbeau, in Montreal. Suzanne marries Marcel on June 7, 1948. Paul-Émile Borduas, leader of the Automatistes, leads the group in composing the manifesto for free speech, Refus Global. Suzanne initially signs, but later redacts her signature when Borduas rejects her poetry.

Her first child, Mousse, is born in 1949 (who will grow up to be the famous film maker Manon Barbeau). The group of artists has been blacklisted, so Marcel and Suzanne move with their friends to the countryside. Suzanne gives birth to François. Marcel has a breakdown in New York, but when she comes to attend to him, she starts a relationship with Borduas. She leaves Marcel and abandons the children at a daycare in the countryside. Marcel's sister eventually agrees to take in Mousse and an undertaker and his wife take in Francois. By this time Suzanne has started a new relationship and runs off with her friend's lover, Peter, to travel the world; but after a terminated pregnancy she returns to Montreal. She invites Mousse to live with her but her invitation is refused. Suzanne moves to Harlem in New York and begins to date a woman named Selena. Together, they join the Freedom Riders.The first few stops go well, but eventually the KKK attacks the bus and destroys it.

By the age of 40, Suzanne is living in Manhattan. There she meets Gary Adams, a man scarred from his experiences in Vietnam. Her son François repeatedly tries to contact her but Suzanne refuses to meet with him. While living in Ottawa, Suzanne meets and becomes friends with her childhood hero, Hilda Strike.

The novel then revisits the author's interactions with her grandmother, but from Suzanne's perspective. On December 23, 2009, Suzanne dies, leaving her estate to Mousse and her children.

Back in the present, the narrator is living in the countryside taking care of her infant daughter. She contemplates how Suzanne's abandonment affected her mother and family dynamic. Nevertheless, she recognizes the debt that the family owes Suzanne, and she promises to remember her.

== Major characters ==
In order of appearance in the novel:

- Anaïs Barbeau-Lavalette: The author herself serves as the narrator of the book and plays an active role in the beginning and ending of the novel.
- Suzanne Meloche: She is the main character of the novel, based on Barbeau-Lavalette's grandmother. The majority of the events in the novel are described from her second-person perspective. She has a gift for writing, speaking, and painting. Throughout her life, she has several love affairs and two children, Mousse and François. She is plagued with guilt about abandoning them, but does not wish to have them in her life.
- Hilda Strike: She was a Canadian runner in the 1932 Olympic Games. She came in second to Stella Walsh, an athlete who was later found to be intersex. Suzanne Meloche was inspired by her athleticism, and both women coincidentally spent the later years of their life living in the same apartment complex. She became a personal friend to Suzanne Meloche.
- Marcel Barbeau: He is a famous French-Canadian artist, Suzanne's ex-husband, and father to Mousse and François. He was part of the original group of artists that created the free speech manifesto Refus Global.
- Paul-Émile Borduas: Borduas began the Automatistes movement, and he wrote the text that accompanied the Refus Global. He had a brief affair with Suzanne Meloche while she was still married to Marcel Barbeau.
- Mousse (Manon) Barbeau: Mousse Barbeau is Suzanne's first child. She is the mother of the narrator, Anaïs Barbeau-Lavalette. She is raised largely by her aunt after her mother abandons her and her brother, François. She chooses not to move back in with Suzanne when given the option later in her childhood. She later becomes a successful French-Canadian filmmaker and creates a documentary about Refus Global.
- François Barbeau: François Barbeau is Suzanne Meloche's second child and Mousse's brother. He is raised by an abusive undertaker, which causes him to develop and unspecified mental disorder.
- Peter: Peter is Suzanne's lover who travels with her to the countryside, Montreal, Brussels, and his family home in London. She leaves him after becoming pregnant and having an abortion.
- Selena: She is Suzanne's African American lover who gives her a place to stay in Harlem and invites her to join the Freedom Riders.
- Gary Adams: Gary is Suzanne's last lover. He writes poetry and suffers PTSD from his experiences in the Vietnam War. He eventually dies from suicide.

== Structure ==
Barbeau-Lavalette serves as the narrator for this piece and directs a second person point of view at Suzanne Meloche. This very personal perspective conveys the intense emotional impact of the relationship between the protagonist, Suzanne, and the narrator/author. Critics such as Ian McGillis claim that it reinforces the novel's structure and unifies the story across several decades. A first person perspective is briefly utilized at the beginning and end of the novel, while the narrator recounts events in the present.

Suzanne is written with a circular structure; the beginning and end discuss events from the same time period while the middle elaborates. The novel is divided into subsections of different time periods in chronological order, with the exception of the beginning, which starts in the present-day. The novel is written in short, generally page-length sections, focusing on a single key idea. According to McGillis, these short sections and sentences were intended to convey a fleeting effect, mimicking the constant movement of Suzanne from place to place.

The prose of the novel is direct and brief. This brevity was also intended by the author to reflect the constant changes in Suzanne's life and surroundings. This style was kept for the English translation of the book.

== Setting ==
The novel begins in Ottawa, where Suzanne Meloche was raised, but then shifts to Montreal, where Suzanne attends the College Marguerite-Bourgeoys. Though much of the middle of the book is set in Montreal, she and her husband, Marcel, as artists, frequently visit New York. After her divorce, she travels to Brussels and London. She returns to Montreal and then to New York. By the end of the novel, she settles back in Ottawa.

== Historical background ==
Many important historical events color the action in Suzanne from 1930 to 2009. The novel is divided into six sections, each covering one to two decades. Multiple historical events influenced Suzanne's life and Suzanne was involves herself in movements for social change. In describing these movements, the narrator discusses themes such as feminism, poverty, Marxism, patriarchy, and racism. By highlighting Suzanne's participation in historical events, the narrator establishes Suzanne as a notable figure, on the same level as her more famous friends.

=== The Canadian Great Depression ===
Suzanne Meloche lived in an impoverished household during the Canadian Great Depression, which fuels her later desire to explore life beyond Ottawa. In discussing Suzanne's family, particularly her father, during the Great Depression, the narrator comments on the nature of unemployment and government-assigned temporary work, commenting on the policies of Premier Maurice Duplessis, who held office during the Great Depression. Duplessis was a very conservative leader who supported rural areas, economic development, and a strong investment in Catholic education, while opposing labor unions, communists, and any anti-establishment group. Suzanne's later involvement in anti-establishment artistic movements such as the Automatistes, sharply contrasts with her conservative upbringing. This rejection of her upbringing characterizes her as a rebel throughout her life.

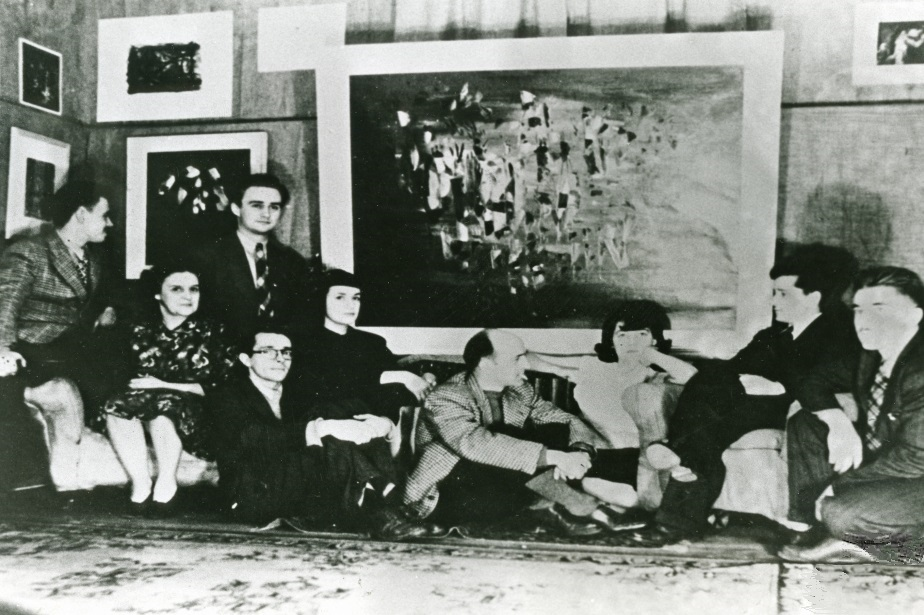
A picture of an art exhibition put on by Les Automatistes in 1947. Suzanne Meloche was a part of this group.

=== Les Automatistes ===
Suzanne Meloche participated in the Les Automatistes movement as a college student, alongside important Canadian artists such as Claude Gauvreau, Françoise Sullivan, and Jean-Paul Riopelle, who are characters within the novel. The Les Automatistes movement contributed heavily to the Canadian Quiet Revolution. The book discusses the creation of their manifesto, Refus Global, as well as the art Suzanne created within the movement, such as her book of poetry, Les Aurores Fulminantes. According to Barbeau-Lavalette, through discussing this art movement, the narrator also explores Marxist, secular, and psychoanalytic ideas that influence Suzanne's development. These ideas contrast the politically conservative ideas that influenced Suzanne's youth. This rebellion through art also established Suzanne as a woman who was stifled by the societal roles in which she was placed, which would later factor into Suzanne's decision to leave her children.

=== Freedom Rides ===
Suzanne Meloche participates in a Freedom Ride in 1961, going from Washington, D.C. to Jackson, Mississippi in order to peacefully protest segregation. Suzanne was on a bus that was firebombed in Anniston, Alabama, and she would later be arrested for participating in these protests and held in the Mississippi State Penitentiary. Suzanne was one of the few white women who participated in this protest. The narrator, by discussing this event, expressed her concerns regarding racism and her recognition of the importance of the civil rights movement. Barbeau-Lavalette takes a strong stance against racism across many of her works. The narrator also reflects on Suzanne's participation in this event as a way for Suzanne to serve a higher cause and to potentially justify leaving her children and husband behind earlier in the novel.

== Critical response ==
''Suzanne'' was a bestseller in Quebec and other French-speaking areas, particularly France. It was discussed on ''Tout le monde en parle'' and placed on CEGEP course lists throughout Canada. The translation by Rhonda Mullins has found similar success, and this translation was nominated for a 2019 ''Canada Reads'' award by actor Yanic Truesdale, who praised it for its portrayal of women and cultural identity. Barbeau-Lavalette herself praised Rhonda Mullins' translation for keeping the novel's rhythm and emotional intensity intact within the English version. It was also nominated for the 2018 BTBA Best Translated Book Award Longlist. The novel was also awarded the "Prix des libraires du Québec."

The novel was highly praised for its writing style and use of language, specifically its use of second person perspective and of its direct, choppy structure. Reviewers also discussed the novel's success in covering a wide stretch of history while still engaging the reader.
