= Léveillée =

Léveillée is a surname of French origin. Notable people with the surname include:

- Claude Léveillée (1932–2011), Canadian actor, pianist, composer, and singer-songwriter
- Jason Roy Léveillée (born 1983), Canadian actor
