= The Ring (2007 film) =

2007 Canadian drama film

- French: Le Ring
- Directed by: Anaïs Barbeau-Lavalette
- Written by: Renée Beaulieu
- Produced by: Ian Quenneville; Thomas Ramoisy
- Starring: Maxime Desjardins-Tremblay; Stéphane Demers; Julianne Côté
- Cinematography: Philippe Lavalette
- Edited by: Carina Baccanale
- Music by: Catherine Major
- Production company: INIS-Relève
- Distributed by: Christal Films
- Release date: October 6, 2007 (Busan)
- Running time: 87 minutes
- Country: Canada
- Language: French

The Ring (French: Le Ring), also known in some releases as The Fight, is a Canadian drama film, directed by Anaïs Barbeau-Lavalette and released in 2007. The film stars Maxime Desjardins-Tremblay as Jessy Blais, a 12-year-old boy living in the impoverished Hochelaga-Maisonneuve neighbourhood in Montreal, who aspires to become a professional wrestler to escape his circumstances.

The cast also includes Stéphane Demers and Suzanne Lemoine as Jessy's parents Claude and Maryse, Maxime Dumontier as his brother Sam and Julianne Côté as his sister Kelly, as well as Jason Roy Léveillée, Émile Proulx-Cloutier and René-Daniel Dubois in supporting roles.

The film had its world premiere at the Busan International Film Festival on October 6, 2007, and was screened on October 18 at the Festival du nouveau cinéma in Montreal, before opening commercially on October 26. It was also subsequently screened at the 2008 Berlin International Film Festival.

The film received two Jutra Award nominations at the 10th Jutra Awards in 2008, for Best Art Direction (David Pelletier) and Best Original Music (Catherine Major). Major won the award for Best Original Music.
