= Catherine Major =

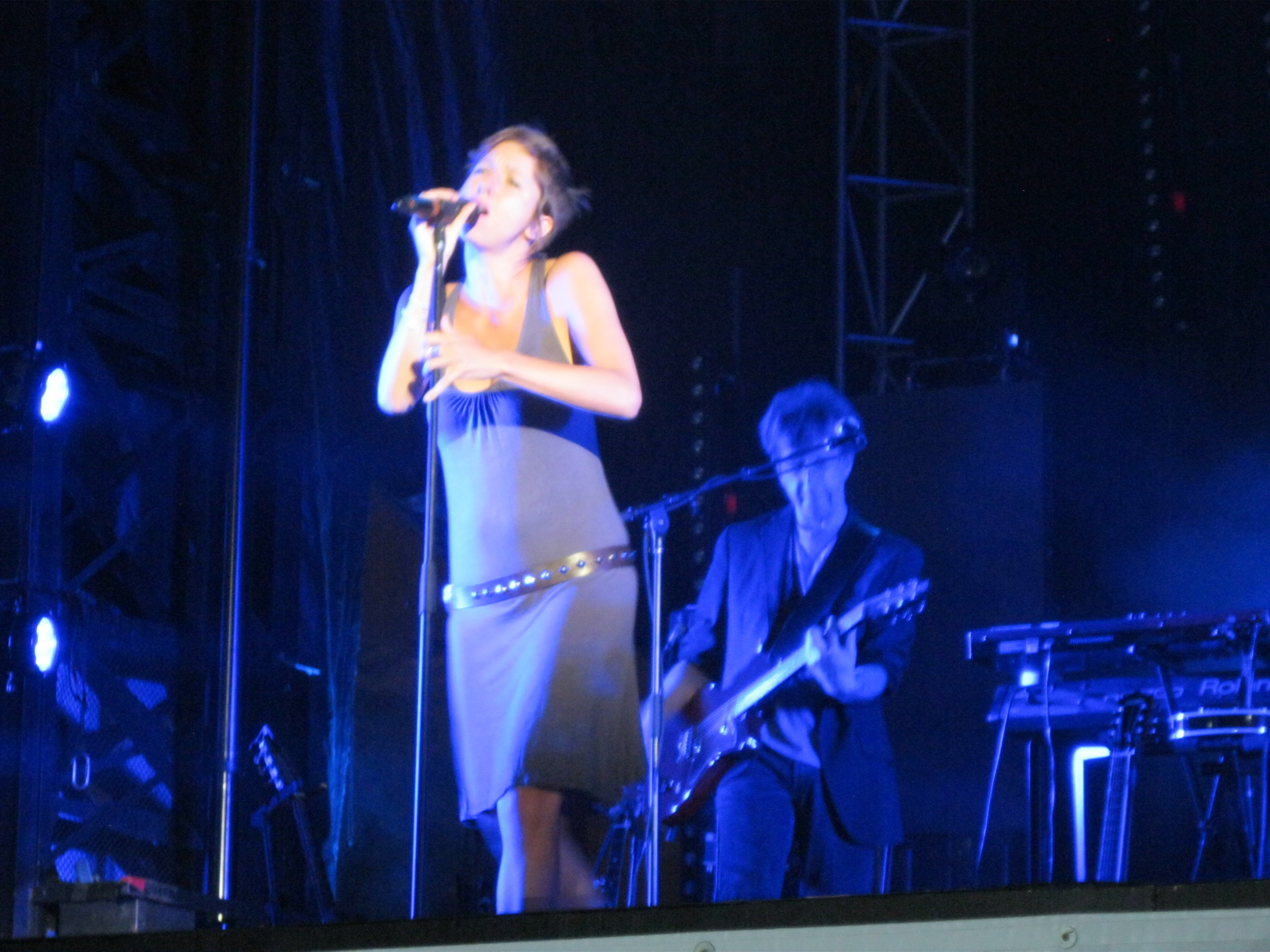
- Catherine Major performing with Daniel Lavoie at the Francofolies de Montréal in 2013.

Background information
- Born: February 18, 1980; Outremont, Quebec, Canada
- Genres: Chanson, pop
- Occupation: Singer
- Instrument: Vocals
- Years active: 2010s-present

Catherine Major (born February 18, 1980) is a Canadian pop singer and songwriter from Quebec. She is most noted for her 2011 album Le désert des solitudes, which was a Juno Award nominee for Francophone Album of the Year at the Juno Awards of 2012.

Originally from Outremont, she studied piano in childhood. She released her debut album Par-dessus bord, in 2004 and toured to support the album as an opening act for Richard Desjardins. In 2007 she composed music for Anaïs Barbeau-Lavalette's film The Ring (Le Ring), for which she won the Jutra Award for Best Original Music at the 10th Jutra Awards. The following year she released her second album, Rose sang.

Le désert des solitudes was released in 2011. In 2012, she received a second Jutra nomination for Best Original Music, for her work on Micheline Lanctôt's film For the Love of God (Pour l'amour de Dieu).

Her fourth album, La maison du monde, followed in 2015.

In 2019, she participated alongside Ginette Reno, Diane Dufresne, Céline Dion, Isabelle Boulay, Luce Dufault, Louise Forestier, Laurence Jalbert, Ariane Moffatt, Marie Denise Pelletier and Marie-Élaine Thibert in a supergroup recording of Renée Claude's "Tu trouveras la paix", as a charitable fundraiser for Alzheimer's disease research after Claude's diagnosis with Alzheimer's was announced. Later the same year she performed a show with the Orchestre Symphonique de Québec, premiering several new songs from her forthcoming fifth album. The album, Carte mère, was released in 2020.
