= Twilight (2007 film) =

2007 Canadian comedy-drama film

- Film poster
- French: La Brunante
- Directed by: Fernand Dansereau
- Written by: Fernand Dansereau
- Produced by: Normand McKay
- Starring: Monique Mercure; Suzanne Clément
- Cinematography: Philippe Lavalette
- Edited by: Hélène Girard
- Music by: Francine Beaudry
- Production company: Productions Totale Fiction
- Distributed by: TVA Films
- Release date: August 29, 2007
- Running time: 101 minutes
- Country: Canada
- Language: French

Twilight (French: La Brunante) is a 2007 Canadian comedy-drama film, directed by Fernand Dansereau. The film stars Monique Mercure as Madeleine, a woman suffering from Alzheimer's disease who travels to the Gaspé region of Quebec where she plans to commit suicide, and Suzanne Clément as Zoé, a troubled younger woman whom she befriends with transformative effects on both of their lives.

The film was Dansereau's first narrative fiction film since Sweet Lies and Loving Oaths (Doux aveux) in 1982, after having concentrated on making documentary films for virtually all of the intervening 25 years. It premiered at the Montreal World Film Festival in August 2007, before going into commercial release in November.

The film received three Prix Jutra nominations at the 10th Jutra Awards in 2008, for Best Film, Best Director (Dansereau) and Best Supporting Actress (Clément).
