= André Turpin =

Canadian cinematographer

- Born: 1966 (age 59–60); Quebec, Canada
- Occupations: Film director, cinematographer, screenwriter
- Years active: 1990s–present
- Spouse: Louise Archambault

André Turpin (born 1966) is a French Canadian cinematographer, film director, and screenwriter.

== Career ==
As a cinematographer, he has won over a dozen awards, including Canadian Screen Awards for Best Cinematography his work on Xavier Dolan's films Mommy (2014) and It's Only the End of the World (2016). He has also won two Genie Awards for Best Cinematography, for Maelström (2000) at the 21st Genie Awards and for Incendies (2010) at the 31st Genie Awards.

In 2015, he was the cinematographer on Adele's music video for "Hello", for which he received an MTV Video Music Award nomination for Best Cinematography at the 2016 MTV Video Music Awards.

As a director and screenwriter, he is best known for his work on the 2001 film Soft Shell Man (Un crabe dans la tête), which was chosen as Canada's submission to the Academy Award for Best Foreign Language Film at the 75th Academy Awards, though it was not ultimately nominated. The film also received nominations for Best Picture and Best Screenplay at the 22nd Genie Awards, and won several Jutra Awards, including Best Director, Best Screenplay, and Best Cinematography.

At the 2nd Canadian Screen Awards, Turpin and Anaïs Barbeau-Lavalette were nominated for the Canadian Screen Award for Best Live Action Short Drama for their short film Ina Litovski.

Alongside Nicolas Bolduc, Erik Ljung, Tobie Marier Robitaille, Sara Mishara, Alexia Toman and Van Royko, he won a Gémeaux Award for Best Photography in a Documentary or Public Affairs program in 2024 for Lac-Mégantic: This Is Not an Accident (Lac-Mégantic : ceci n’est pas un accident).

== Personal life ==
He is married to film director Louise Archambault.

== Filmography ==
=== Cinematographer ===
- 1992 - Croix de bois
- 1993 - Because Why
- 1995 - Zigrail
- 1996 - Cosmos
- 1997 - The Countess of Baton Rouge (La Comtesse de Bâton Rouge)
- 1998 - August 32nd on Earth (Un 32 août sur terre)
- 1999 - Atomic Saké
- 1999 - Matroni and Me (Matroni et moi)
- 2000 - Maelström
- 2001 - Soft Shell Man (Un crabe dans la tête)
- 2004 - Childstar
- 2005 - Familia
- 2006 - Congorama
- 2008 - It's Not Me, I Swear! (C'est pas moi, je le jure!)
- 2010 - Incendies
- 2012 - Ina Litovski
- 2013 - Remember Me (Mémorable moi)
- 2013 - Whitewash
- 2013 - Tom at the Farm (Tom à la ferme)
- 2014 - Mommy
- 2015 - "Hello" (Music video for Adele)
- 2016 - It's Only the End of the World (Juste la fin du monde)
- 2018 - The Death and Life of John F. Donovan
- 2019 - Matthias & Maxime
- 2019 - Playmobil: The Movie
- 2022 - The Night Logan Woke Up (La nuit où Laurier Gaudreault s'est réveillé)
- 2023 - The Nature of Love (Simple comme Sylvain)
- 2025 - Lovely Day (Mille secrets mille dangers)

=== Director ===
- 1995 - Zigrail
- 1996 - Cosmos ("Jules & Fanny")
- 2001 - Soft Shell Man (Un crabe dans la tête)
- 2012 - Ina Litovski
- 2012 - Sept heures trois fois par année
- 2014 - Prends-moi
- 2015 - Endorphine
