= Incendies =

2010 drama film by Denis Villeneuve

- Theatrical release poster
- Directed by: Denis Villeneuve
- Screenplay by: Denis Villeneuve; Valérie Beaugrand-Champagne
- Based on: Incendies by Wajdi Mouawad
- Produced by: Luc Déry; Kim McCraw
- Starring: Lubna Azabal; Mélissa Désormeaux-Poulin; Maxim Gaudette; Rémy Girard
- Cinematography: André Turpin
- Edited by: Monique Dartonne
- Music by: Grégoire Hetzel
- Production company: micro_scope
- Distributed by: Entertainment One
- Release dates: 3 September 2010 (Venice); 4 September 2010 (Telluride); 17 September 2010 (Canada)
- Running time: 130 minutes
- Countries: Canada; France
- Languages: French; English; Arabic
- Budget: $6.5 million
- Box office: $16 million

Incendies (French: [ɛ̃sɑ̃di]; transl. Fires) is a 2010 mystery drama film directed by Denis Villeneuve, who co-wrote the screenplay with Valérie Beaugrand-Champagne. Adapted from Wajdi Mouawad's play of the same name, Incendies stars Lubna Azabal, Mélissa Désormeaux-Poulin, Maxim Gaudette, and Rémy Girard.

The story concerns Canadian twins who travel to their mother's native country in the Levant to uncover her hidden past amidst a bloody civil war. While the country is unnamed, the events in the film are heavily influenced by the Lebanese Civil War and particularly the story of the prisoner Souha Bechara. The film was shot mainly in Montreal, with fifteen days spent in Jordan.

It premiered at the Venice and Toronto Film Festivals in September 2010, and was released in Quebec on 17 September 2010. It met with widespread critical acclaim in Canada and abroad and won numerous awards.

In 2011, it was nominated for the Academy Award for Best Foreign Language Film. Incendies also won eight Genie Awards, including Best Motion Picture.

== Plot ==
Following the death of their mother, Nawal, an Arab immigrant in Canada, Jeanne and her twin brother Simon meet with French Canadian notary Jean Lebel, their mother's employer and family friend. Nawal's will refers to not keeping a promise, denying her a proper gravestone and casket, unless Jeanne and Simon track down their mysterious brother, of whose existence they were previously unaware, and their father, who they believed was dead. Nawal has left two letters; one is to be delivered to Jeanne and Simon's father, and the other is to be delivered to their brother. Jeanne accepts; Simon, on the other hand, seemingly having had a more difficult relationship with Nawal and her unusual personality, is reluctant to join Jeanne on this pursuit.

Nawal came from a Christian family in a Levantine country, and she fell in love with a refugee named Wahab, resulting in her pregnancy. Her family murders her lover and nearly shoots her in an honour killing, but her grandmother spares her, making her promise to leave the village after her baby's birth and start a new life in the city of Daresh. The grandmother tattoos the back of the baby's heel and sends him to an orphanage in Kfar Khout.

While Nawal is at university in Daresh a few years later, civil war and war crimes break out, with Nawal opposing the war on human rights grounds. Her son's orphanage is destroyed by Muslim militants. Nawal leaves Daresh to try to find her son and boards a bus full of Muslim refugees. Christian Nationalists shoot the driver and fire into the bus full of passengers, only missing Nawal and a mother with her daughter. As the Nationalists prepare to set the bus on fire, the survivors try to escape towards the back of the bus. Nawal shows her crucifix and tells the Nationalists that she is Christian. She attempts to save the girl by claiming her as her own, but the girl runs towards the burning bus, calling for her mother, and is shot dead. Nawal finds her way back to town and joins the Muslim fighters. She tutors the son of a nationalist leader, eventually earning enough trust to smuggle in a gun to shoot the leader. She is imprisoned in Kfar Ryat and sings through the screams of other prisoners, earning her the nickname "The Woman Who Sings". To attempt to break her, she is raped by torturer Abou Tarek who leaves her saying, "sing now". She consequently gives birth to the twins.

After traveling to her mother's native country, Jeanne gradually uncovers this past and persuades Simon to join her. With help from Lebel, they learn their brother's name is Nihad of May (the month he was born in) and track down Chamseddine, a local warlord. Simon meets with him and Chamseddine reveals that he attacked the orphanage in Kfar Khout, where he spared the children and converted Nihad into an Islamic child soldier. He then reveals the war-mad Nihad was captured by the nationalists, turned by them, trained as a torturer, and then sent to Kfar Ryat, where he took the name Abou Tarek, making him both the twins' maternal half-brother and father; as such, both letters are addressed to the same person. Like Nawal, Nihad's superiors gave him a new life in Canada after the war. By chance, Nawal encountered him at a Canadian swimming pool and saw both the tattoo and his face, realizing her long-lost son was her rapist all along. The shock of learning the truth caused Nawal to suffer a stroke, which led to her decline and untimely death at age 60.

The twins find Nihad in Canada and deliver Nawal's letters to him. He opens both of them; the first letter addresses him as the twins' father, her rapist, and is filled with contempt. The second letter addresses him as the twins' brother and is instead written with caring words, saying that he, as Nawal's son, is deserving of love. Horrified at the truth, Nihad tries to chase after the twins, but they are gone.

Nawal gets her gravestone. Sometime later, Nihad visits it.

== Cast ==
- Lubna Azabal as Nawal Marwan
- Mélissa Désormeaux-Poulin as Jeanne "Janaan" Marwan
- Maxim Gaudette as Simon "Sarwan" Marwan
- Rémy Girard as Jean Lebel
- Abdelghafour Elaaziz as Abou Tarek/Nihad "Nihad de Mai" Harmanni
- Allen Altman as Notary Maddad
- Mohamed Majd as Chamseddine
- Nabil Sawalha as Fahim
- Baya Belal as Maika
- Bader Alami as Nicolas
- Karim Babin as Chamseddine's guard
- Anthony Ecclissi as Lifeguard
- Joyce Raie as Student Journalist
- Yousef Shweihat as Sharif
- Celine Soulier as French Journalist
- Mher Karakashian as Chamseddine's assistant

== Production ==
=== Development ===
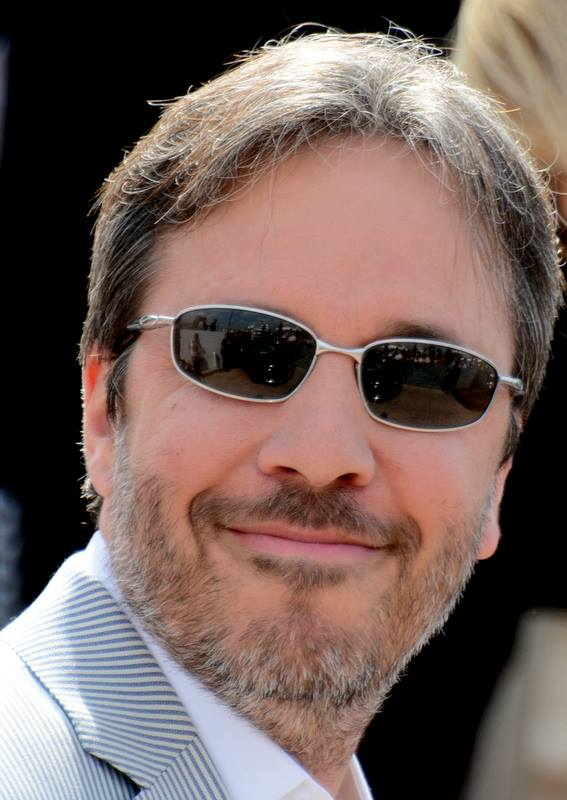
Director Denis Villeneuve adapted Wajdi Mouawad's play Incendies after seeing it performed in Montreal in 2004.

Parts of the story were based on the life of Souha Bechara. The story is based on events that happened during the Lebanese Civil War of 1975 to 1990, but the filmmakers attempted to make the location of the plot ambiguous.

Director Denis Villeneuve first saw Wajdi Mouawad's play Incendies at Théâtre de Quat'Sous in Montreal in 2004, commenting "I had this strong intuition that I was in front of a masterpiece". Villeneuve acknowledged unfamiliarity with Arab culture, but was drawn to Incendies as "a modern story with a sort of Greek tragedy element". In adapting the screenplay, Villeneuve, while keeping the story structure and characters, replaced "all" the dialogue, even envisioning a silent film, abandoning the idea due to expense. He showed Mouawad some completed scenes to convince the initially reluctant playwright to grant permission for the film. Villeneuve spent five years working on the screenplay, in between directing two films. Mouawad later praised the film as "brilliantly elegant" and gave Villeneuve full credit. The project had a budget of $6.5 million, and received funding from Telefilm Canada.

=== Casting ===
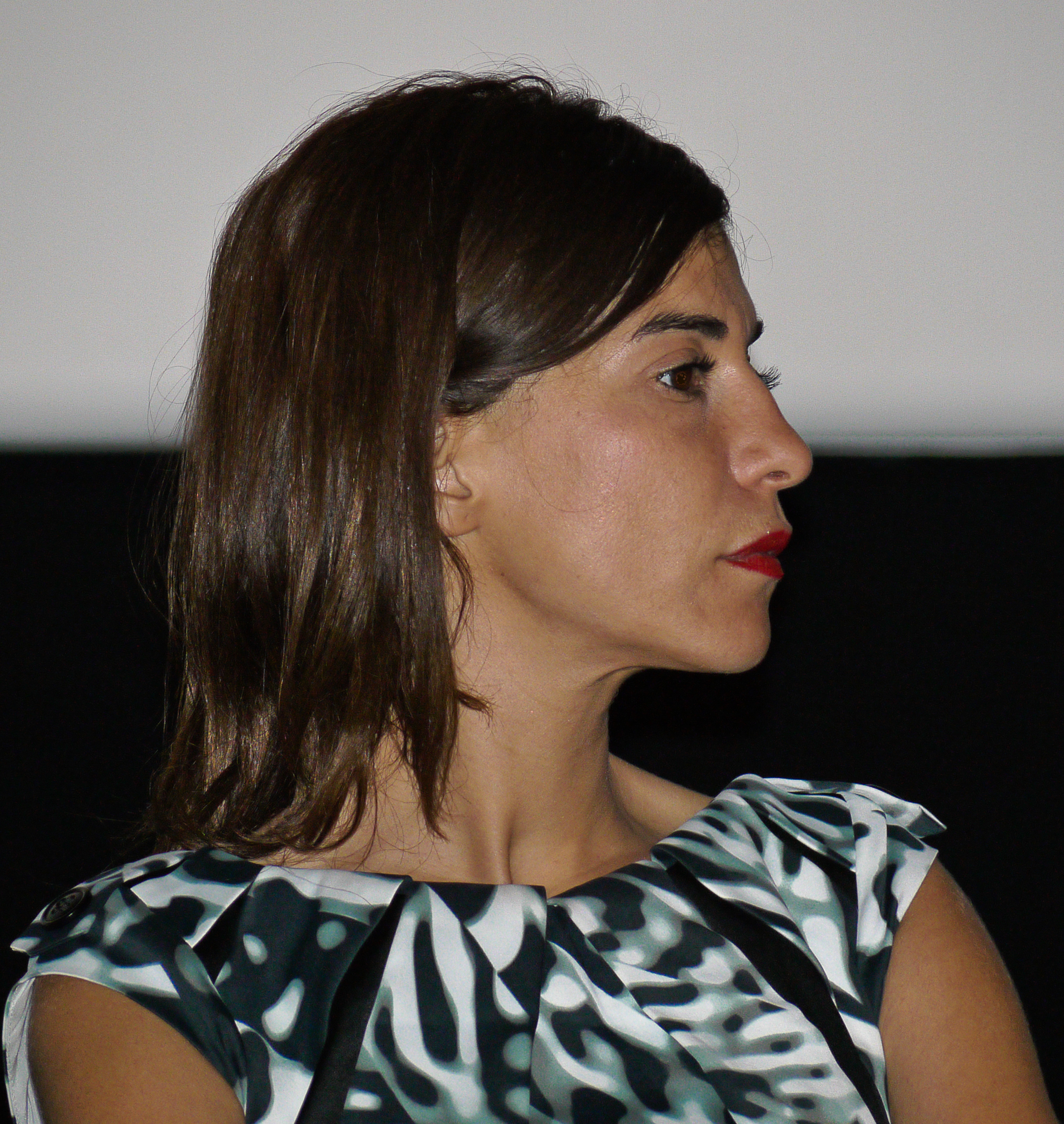
Moroccan-Belgian actress Lubna Azabal was cast as Nawal after an extensive search, and won Best Actress at Belgium's Magritte Awards and Canada's Genie Awards.

For the part of Nawal, Villeneuve said he conducted an extensive search for actresses across Canada. He considered casting the main character to be the most challenging, and at one point contemplated using two or three actresses to play the character since the story spans four decades. He finally met Lubna Azabal, a Belgian actress of Moroccan—Spanish descent in Paris, intrigued by her "expressive and eloquent" face in Paradise Now (2005). Although she was 30, Villeneuve thought she appeared 18 and could play the part throughout the entire film, using makeup.

Villeneuve selected Canadian actress Mélissa Désormeaux-Poulin to play Jeanne, saying the role required listening skills and Désormeaux-Poulin is "a very generous actress". Before Incendies, Désormeaux-Poulin was mainly known for "light fare". Montreal actor Allen Altman, who played a notary, worked with a dialect coach for hours to develop a blend of the French and Arab accents before auditioning. While shooting in Jordan, to research his role, actor Maxim Gaudette toured a Palestinian camp near Amman.

=== Filming ===
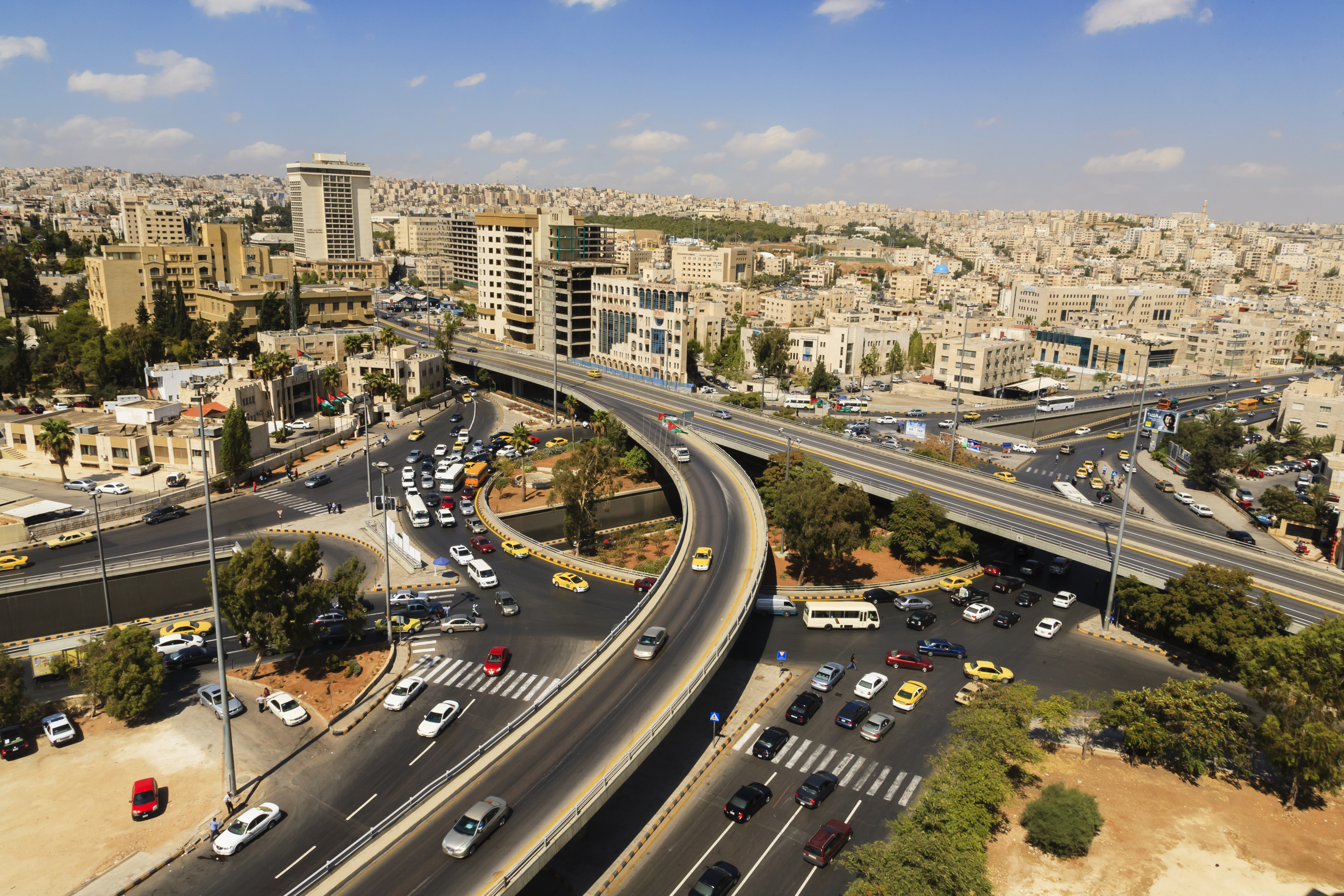
Some of the 15 days of filming in Jordan was done in Amman.

The film was shot in Montreal and Jordan. The film took 40 days to shoot, of which 15 were spent in Jordan, with Villeneuve aiming to film no scene without being sure it would not be cut. Principal photography began on 15 March 2009.

For the scenes filmed in Jordan, Villeneuve used a Lebanese and Iraqi crew, though he feared the war scenes would be too reminiscent of bad experiences for them. However, he said the Arab crew members felt "It's important that those sorts of stories are on the screen". Some of the filming in Jordan took place in the capital of Amman. To recreate Beirut, art director André-Line Beauparlant built up rock and debris on a street in Amman.

=== Music ===
Two tracks by British band Radiohead from their album Amnesiac, "You and Whose Army?" and "Like Spinning Plates", were used in the film. The music was considered so notable and integral to the film that the music was mentioned in many reviews. Film critic David Ehrlich wrote that "Incendies exploits Radiohead tracks for the multiplicity of their meaning, empowering the image by dislocating viewers from it". Villeneuve said that he had written "You and Whose Army?" into the script from the beginning, as it was intended to make it "clear that [the film] will be a westerner's point of view about this world". One music reviewer gave it first place in their "Top Ten Music Moments in Film".

== Release ==
Incendies was officially selected to play in the 67th Venice International Film Festival, 2010 Telluride Film Festival, 2010 Toronto International Film Festival, 2011 Sundance Film Festival and 2011 New Directors/New Films Festival. The film opened in Toronto and Vancouver in January 2011.

In the United States, the film was distributed by Sony Pictures Classics. When the film was screened in Beirut in March 2011, Villeneuve claimed "a lot of people said to me that we should show this film to their children, to show them what they had been through".

In 2023, Telefilm Canada announced that the film was one of 23 titles that would be digitally restored under its new Canadian Cinema Reignited program to preserve classic Canadian films.

== Reception ==
=== Box office ===
In Canada, the film had passed the $1-million mark at the box office by October 2010. By the end of April 2011, the film grossed $4.7 million. In Quebec theatres alone, Incendies made $3 million. It was considered a success in the country.

According to Box Office Mojo, the film completed its theatrical run on 29 September 2011, after making $2,071,334 in the U.S. According to The Numbers, the film grossed $6,857,096 in North America and $9,181,247 in other territories for a worldwide total of $16,038,343.

=== Critical response ===
Incendies received highly positive reviews from critics. Review aggregator website Rotten Tomatoes reports 91% positive reviews based on 124 reviews, with an average rating of 7.9/10. The site's critics consensus reads, "It's messy, overlong, and a touch melodramatic, but those flaws pale before Incendies' impressive acting and devastating emotional impact." On Metacritic the film has a weighted average score of 80 out 100 based on 42 reviews, indicating "generally favorable reviews".

The film enjoyed a positive reception in its country and province. Kevin N. Laforest of the Montreal Film Journal gave it 3.5 stars out of four and wrote, "Villeneuve has done his best work yet here". The Montreal Gazette's Brendan Kelly gave the film five stars and called it a "masterwork". Marc Cassivi of La Presse claimed the film transcended the play. Peter Howell, writing for The Toronto Star, gave the film four stars, called it "a commanding film of multiple revelations", and the best of 2010, and praised Lubna Azabal as "first amongst equals". However, Martin Morrow of CBC News was unimpressed, saying, "Villeneuve's screen adaptation strips away all this finely textured flesh and leaves only the bare bones". University of Berlin film scholar Claudia Kotte wrote that the film, along with Monsieur Lazhar (2011) and War Witch (2012), represent a break in the Cinema of Quebec from focus on local history to global concerns, with Incendies adding Oedipal themes. Authors Gada Mahrouse, Chantal Maillé and Daniel Salée wrote McCraw and Déry's films, Incendies, Monsieur Lazhar and Inch'Allah, depict Quebec as part of the global village and as accepting minorities, particularly Middle Easterners or "Muslim Others".

Roger Ebert gave the film three and a half stars, saying "it wants to be much more than a thriller and succeeds in demonstrating how senseless and futile it is to hate others because of their religion", and Azabal "is never less than compelling". He later selected the film as his favourite to win the Academy Award for Best Foreign Language Film, though it lost to In a Better World from Denmark. Leonard Maltin also gave the film three and a half stars, referring to it as "tough, spellbinding". Ty Burr, writing for The Boston Globe, gave the film three and a half stars, praising a bus scene as harrowing but saying the climax is "a plot twist that feels like one coincidence too far", that "leaves the audience doing math on their fingers rather than reeling in shock". Incendies was named by Stephen Holden of The New York Times as one of the 10 best films of 2011. Betsy Sharkey of the Los Angeles Times called it Villeneuve's "best-realized work yet". A number of reviews complimented use of the song "You and Whose Army?" by Radiohead. Criticisms have included charges of melodrama and orientalism.

=== Accolades ===
On 22 September 2010, Incendies was chosen to represent Canada at the 83rd Academy Awards in the category of Best Foreign Language Film. It made the shortlist on 19 January 2011, one of nine films and was nominated for the Academy Award for Best Foreign Language Film on 25 January 2011.

It won eight awards at the 31st Genie Awards, including Best Motion Picture, Best Actress for Azabal and Best Director for Villeneuve. Along with Incendies, Villeneuve won the Rogers Best Canadian Film Award in 2009 for the film Polytechnique, the first Canadian filmmaker to win it twice in a row. Incendies also won the Prix Jutra for Best Film, Director, Screenplay, Actress (Azabal), Editing, Cinematography, Art Direction, Costumes and Sound.

It is also the only film to date to have won both the Toronto International Film Festival Award for Best Canadian Film and the Vancouver International Film Festival Award for Best Canadian Film.

In 2025, it was one of the films voted for the "Readers' Choice" edition of The New York Times' list of "The 100 Best Movies of the 21st Century," finishing at number 127.

Award	Date of ceremony	Category	Recipient(s)	Result	Ref(s)
Academy Awards	27 February 2011	Best Foreign Language Film	Denis Villeneuve	Nominated	
Adelaide Film Festival	March 2011	International Award for Best Feature Film	Denis Villeneuve	Won	
Atlantic Film Festival	2010	Best Canadian Feature	Denis Villeneuve	Won	
Australian Film Critics Association	15 February 2012	Best Overseas Film (Foreign Language)	Denis Villeneuve	Won	
Boston Society of Film Critics	11 December 2011	Best Foreign Language Film	Denis Villeneuve	Won	
BAFTA Awards	12 February 2012	Film Not in the English Language	Denis Villeneuve	Nominated	
César Awards	24 February 2012	Best Foreign Film	Denis Villeneuve	Nominated	
Chicago Film Critics Association	19 December 2011	Best Foreign Language Film	Denis Villeneuve	Nominated	
David di Donatello Awards	2011	Best Foreign Film	Denis Villeneuve	Nominated	
Genie Awards	10 March 2011	Best Motion Picture	Luc Déry and Kim McCraw	Won	
Genie Awards	10 March 2011	Best Director	Denis Villeneuve	Won	
Genie Awards	10 March 2011	Best Actress	Lubna Azabal	Won	
Genie Awards	10 March 2011	Best Adapted Screenplay	Denis Villeneuve	Won	
Genie Awards	10 March 2011	Best Art Direction	André-Line Beauparlant	Nominated	
Genie Awards	10 March 2011	Best Cinematography	André Turpin	Won	
Genie Awards	10 March 2011	Best Editing	Monique Dartonne	Won	
Genie Awards	10 March 2011	Best Sound	Jean Umansky and Jean-Pierre Laforce	Won	
Genie Awards	10 March 2011	Best Sound Editing	Sylvain Bellemare, Simon Meilleur and Claire Pochon	Won	
Genie Awards	10 March 2011	Best Makeup	Kathryn Casault	Nominated	
International Film Festival Rotterdam	2011	UPC Audience Award	Denis Villeneuve	Won	
Jutra Awards	13 March 2011	Best Film	Luc Déry, Kim McCraw and micro scope	Won	
Jutra Awards	13 March 2011	Best Direction	Denis Villeneuve	Won	
Jutra Awards	13 March 2011	Best Screenplay	Denis Villeneuve	Won	
Jutra Awards	13 March 2011	Best Actress	Lubna Azabal	Won	
Jutra Awards	13 March 2011	Best Actress	Mélissa Désormeaux-Poulin	Nominated	
Jutra Awards	13 March 2011	Best Art Direction	André-Line Beauparlant	Won	
Jutra Awards	13 March 2011	Best Cinematography	André Turpin	Won	
Jutra Awards	13 March 2011	Best Editing	Monique Dartonne	Won	
Jutra Awards	13 March 2011	Best Sound	Sylvain Bellemare, Jean Umansky and Jean-Pierre Laforce	Won	
Jutra Awards	13 March 2011	Best Costume Design	Sophie Lefebvre	Won	
Lumière Awards	13 January 2012	Best French-Language Film	Denis Villeneuve	Won	
Magritte Awards	4 February 2012	Best Actress	Lubna Azabal	Won	
New York Film Critics Circle	9 January 2012	Best Foreign Language Film	Denis Villeneuve	Runner-up	
Toronto Film Critics Association	14 December 2010	Best Canadian Film	Denis Villeneuve	Won	
Toronto International Film Festival	September 2010	Best Canadian Feature Film	Denis Villeneuve	Won	
Valladolid International Film Festival	November 2010	Audience Award	Denis Villeneuve	Won	
Valladolid International Film Festival	November 2010	Best Screenplay	Denis Villeneuve	Won	
Valladolid International Film Festival	November 2010	Youth Jury Award	Denis Villeneuve	Won	
Vancouver Film Critics Circle	2011	Best Canadian Film	Denis Villeneuve	Won	
Vancouver Film Critics Circle	2011	Best Director of a Canadian Film	Denis Villeneuve	Won	
Vancouver Film Critics Circle	2011	Best Actress in a Canadian Film	Lubna Azabal	Won	
Vancouver Film Critics Circle	2011	Best Supporting Actor in a Canadian Film	Maxim Gaudette	Nominated	
Vancouver Film Critics Circle	2011	Best Supporting Actress in a Canadian Film	Mélissa Désormeaux-Poulin	Nominated	
Vancouver International Film Festival	2011	Best Canadian Film	Denis Villeneuve	Won	
Vilnius International Film Festival	March 2011	The Audience Award	Denis Villeneuve	Won	

== See also ==
- List of Canadian submissions for the Academy Award for Best Foreign Language Film
- List of submissions to the 83rd Academy Awards for Best Foreign Language Film
