= Taking the Plunge (film) =

2007 film by Frédéric D'Amours

- French: À vos marques... party!
- Directed by: Frédéric D'Amours
- Written by: Caroline Héroux; Martine Pagé
- Produced by: Christian Larouche; Caroline Héroux
- Starring: Mélissa Désormeaux-Poulin; Mariloup Wolfe; Sylvie Moreau; Jason Roy Léveillée
- Cinematography: Jean-Pierre Trudel
- Edited by: Éric Genois
- Music by: Mario Sévigny
- Production companies: Christal Films; Gaëa Films
- Release date: March 30, 2007
- Running time: 119 minutes
- Country: Canada
- Language: French

Taking the Plunge (French: À vos marques... party!, lit. "On Your Marks...Party!") is a Canadian comedy film, directed by Frédéric D'Amours and released in 2007.

The film stars Mélissa Désormeaux-Poulin as Gaby, a teenager who formerly competed in swimming until abandoning the sport due to her self-consciousness about a burn scar on her body; having become a socially withdrawn outsider who aspires only to make it through her final year of high school so that she can go to CEGEP, she is forced by school principal Peggy (Sylvie Moreau) to take on the job of helping new student Sandrine Meilleur (Mariloup Wolfe) to integrate into the school's social environment, which draws Gaby back out of her shell and into a romance with Frédérick Bédard (Jason Roy Léveillée), the popular star of the school's swimming team.

The cast also includes Hélène Bourgeois Leclerc, Maxime Desbiens-Tremblay, Alexandre Despatie, Roxanne Gaudette-Loiseau, Guy Jodoin, Alyssa Labelle, Kim Lambert, Samuel Landry, Catherine de Léan, Marina Orsini, and Andrée Watters in supporting roles.

The film opened in theatres on March 30, 2007.

Taking the Plunge 2 (À vos marques... party!), a sequel film in which Gaby and Fred travel to Quebec City to take part in a swimming competition, went into production in December 2007, and was released commercially in 2009.

Simon Poudrette received a Jutra Award nomination for Best Sound at the 10th Jutra Awards in 2008.
