= Andrée Watters =

Canadian musician

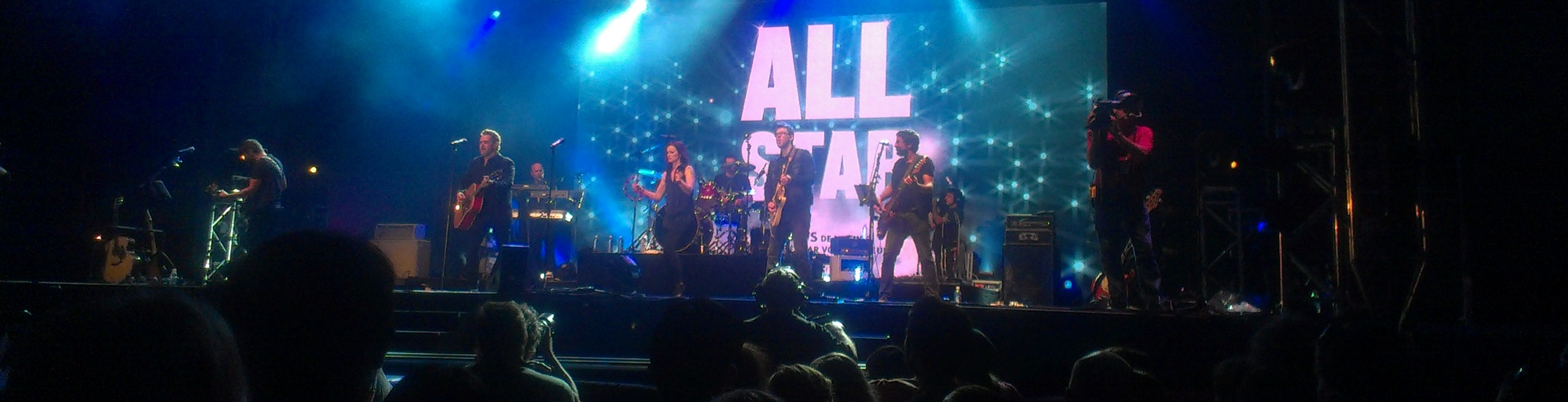
- Spectacle Andrée Watters et Sylvain Cossette dans la festival des montgolfières St-Jean-Sur-Richelieu 2015

Background information
- Born: Andrée Watters-Michaud; January 25, 1983 (age 43)
- Origin: Charlesbourg, Quebec, Canada
- Genres: Pop-rock, country-rock
- Years active: 2003–present
- Labels: ViK/BMG, Sony, Vega, Universal, S7 Productions

Andrée Watters-Michaud (born January 25, 1983) is a Canadian musician and a two-time Félix Award winner from Quebec.

== Biography ==
Album Cover of Watter's debut album AW released on May 31, 2004

Watters was born in Charlesbourg, Quebec, grew up in the Quebec City region and first showed her talent in a Christmas-related musical comedy when she was 15 years old. She later participated in a youth singing contest in which she finished first provincially and third across Canada. After moving to Montreal two years later, she made her first live public appearance in the Radio-Canada game show La Fureur.

Watters' brother Patrick, who worked as a firefighter in Alberta, Canada, was killed in July 2007 in a helicopter crash while he and several hundred other firefighters combated a major forest fire near Fort McMurray in northern Alberta. Four others were injured in the incident.

In 2003, after signing with Sony BMG, Watters released her first album AW, co-written and produced by Fred St-Gelais, which sold 75,000 copies in Quebec alone.The hits "Si exceptionnel" and "Ne reste pas" were the two songs that charted the highest in the Quebec Francophone charts including the Radio Énergie Countdown across the province. There were attempts by the label company to release a European version of the disc in France, but the project was cancelled. After the success of the album AW, she was awarded a Félix Award as "Best Rock Album of the Year" and was nominated to four other Félix awards.

Her second album À travers was released in 2005 with "Laisse la pluie" being the most notable hit across the charts in Quebec.

In 2006, along with Bruno Pelletier, Sylvain Cossette, Daniel Boucher and Gabrielle Destroismaisons, Watters participated in the musical show, Dracula - Entre l'amour et la mort as the female lead, Mina.

In 2007, she participated as herself in the movie Taking the Plunge (À vos marques... party!) and released a song for the movie's soundtrack.

In 2008, Watters was one of the headliners of the 2008 CFL Grey Cup Diet Pepsi Halftime Show. Along with fellow Canadian natives, Theory of a Deadman.

Album Cover of Minuit (2008)

Her third album titled Minuit was released on April 29, 2008. The title song MINUIT was a #1 hit on the Francophone Chart in Quebec. She herself co-wrote the ten tracks and the album was produced along with singer-songwriter Sylvain Cossette who guided her as producer/co-songwriter of the album. The album consisted of a mix of rock songs and ballads in which Cossette had many top-charted singles during his career. At the same time, she signed with Universal Music and Mark Vinet Management.

During the summer of 2008, she toured along with Dan Bigras and his show titled "Dan et ses blondes", and opened for Cossette's "70s Tour" and a tour of her own in 2010.

In 2009, she translated Justin Bieber's hit song, One Less Lonely Girl, and coached him when he recorded the French version.

In 2011, Andrée released a new album Country Rock, which has since peaked at #29 on the Canadian Albums Chart.

In 2012, Watters' released a second country album titled "Country Rock COVER" and toured French Canada. She was also nominated for 2 Felix awards, including Best Country Album.

Starting in 2011, her production company has been involved with many music projects including: Girls Wanna Have Fun!, 70s, All Star, 5x5, Glam Rock, as well as children projects: Ari Cui Cui, Lily et le Lutin, and Pyjama Party.

In 2017, Andrée Watters Productions launched ReCover Band, SuperNOVA, Funk & Soul and a reboot of the hit show Girls Wanna Have Fun!

In 2026 she completed a Bachelor of Arts in psychology from the Université du Québec à Trois-Rivières.

== Awards and nominations ==
In 2004, the success of the album resulted in a Félix Award for "Best Rock Album of the Year" at the annual ADISQ awards, the Quebec provincial version of the Canadian Juno Awards. She was also nominated for four other Felix awards including "Best Female Singer of the Year and "Breakthrough Artist of the Year". In 2006, she again won a Félix Award for "Best Rock Album of the Year" for her sophomore effort titled "À Travers". In 2009, she received a SOCAN award for the song Tout de moi. She was nominated for 2 Adisq Felix awards, including Best Country Album in 2012. She also received multiple ADISQ nominations for her company's work on various music albums between 2014 and 2017.

== Discography ==
=== Albums ===
==== AW (2003) ====
- Label : Sony-BMG / MAF Productions
1. "Cent ans" (Andrée Watters, Fred St-Gelais)
2. "Dépendre de toi" (Andrée Watters, Fred St-Gelais)
3. "Si exceptionnel" (Andrée Watters, Fred St-Gelais)
4. "Ne reste pas" (Eric Collard, Fred St-Gelais)
5. "Désert" (Andrée Watters, Nicolas Maranda, Fred St-Gelais)
6. "Temps" (Andrée Watters, Fred St-Gelais)
7. "Ici je suis de trop" (Andrée Watters, Fred St-Gelais)
8. "Exister à l'envers" (Andrée Watters, Fred St-Gelais)
9. "J't aimerai quand meme" (Andrée Watters)
10. "Enfer" (Andrée Watters, Fred St-Gelais)
11. "Toute seule sur mon vieux divan" (Andrée Watters, Fred St-Gelais)

==== À travers (2005) ====
- Label: Sony-BMG
1. "Laisse la pluie"
2. "L'ange perdu"
3. "Ma face cachée"
4. "Ce que je perds"
5. "La seule"
6. "À travers moi"
7. "Décembre"
8. "Tu pars"
9. "Rien à perdre"
10. "Enterrée"
11. "Facile à dire"
12. "C'est à toi"

==== Dracula - Entre l'amour et la mort (2006) ====
1. "Cruelle et tendre Mina" (with Bruno Pelletier)
2. "Ce que je vois" (with Daniel Boucher, Pierre Flynn, Sylvain Cossette and Gabrielle Destroismaisons)
3. Urgence"

==== Minuit (2008) ====
1. "Minuit"
2. "Dites-moi"
3. "Tout de moi"
4. "S'il te reste"
5. "Si je pouvais savoir"
6. J'ai voulu"
7. "Le Tour du Monde"
8. "De l'Amour pour toi"
9. "Garde tes larmes"
10. "A distance"

==== Country Rock (2011) ====
1. "Émerveille-moi"
2. "One Day"
3. "Ma liberté"
4. "Sans toi"
5. "Tu peux m'oublier"
6. "Plus rien"
7. "Une photo de toi"
8. "Avant ton départ"
9. "Souvenirs"

==== Country Rock COVER (2012) ====
1. "Any Man of Mine"
2. "Proud Mary"
3. "You Shook Me All Night Long"
4. "The First Cut is the Deepest"
5. "It's a Heartache"
6. "Jackson"
7. "Jolene"
8. "Time After Time"
9. "I'm Like a Bird"

=== Singles ===
From AW

- "Dépendre de toi"
- "Si exceptionnel"
- "Ne reste pas"
- "Enfer"

From À travers

- "Laisse la pluie"
- "Ce que je perds"

From À vos marques... party!

- "Qui je suis" (soundtrack)

From Minuit

- "Minuit"
- "Tout de moi"
- "À distance"
- "Le tour du monde"

From Country Rock

- "Émerveille-moi"
- "Ma liberté"
- "One Day"
- "Une photo de toi"
- "Tu peux m'oublier"

== Filmography ==
- Taking the Plunge (À vos marques... party!) - 2007
