= Familia (2005 film) =

2005 film

- Directed by: Louise Archambault
- Written by: Louise Archambault
- Produced by: Luc Déry; Kim McCraw
- Starring: Sylvie Moreau; Mylène St. Sauveur; Macha Grenon; Juliette Gosselin
- Cinematography: André Turpin
- Edited by: Sophie Leblond
- Music by: Ramachandra Borcar
- Production company: micro_scope
- Release dates: August 9, 2005 (Locarno); September 16, 2005 (Canada)
- Running time: 102 minutes
- Country: Canada
- Language: French
- Budget: C$1.9 million

Familia is a 2005 Canadian drama film written and directed by Louise Archambault. Starring Sylvie Moreau and Macha Grenon, the film centres on two longtime friends whose families become entangled. It debuted in competition at the 2005 Locarno International Film Festival and shared the Best Canadian First Feature Film award at the 2005 Toronto International Film Festival.

== Synopsis ==
Mimi is an aerobics instructor whose gambling debts force her to leave Montreal with her teenage daughter, Marguerite. After a planned trip to California falls is cancelled, they stay with Mimi’s longtime friend Janine, an interior decorator living in Saint-Hilaire. Janine lets Mimi stay with her and later offers her work. Tensions then grow between the two women and between their daughters, Marguerite and Gabrielle. The conflict is resolved when Janine enlists Mimi’s help in taking revenge on her unfaithful husband, Charles.

== Cast ==
The cast includes:

- Sylvie Moreau as Mimi
- Mylène St. Sauveur as Marguerite
- Macha Grenon as Janine
- Juliette Gosselin as Gabrielle
- Micheline Lanctôt as Madeleine
- Vincent Graton as Charles

== Production ==
The film was produced by micro_scope, with participation from Telefilm Canada, SODEC, the Harold Greenberg Fund, Radio-Canada and Super Écran. It was written and directed by Louise Archambault. The film had a budget of C$1.9 million.

== Release ==
The film debuted in competition at the 2005 Locarno International Film Festival. It later screened in the Canada First programme at the 2005 Toronto International Film Festival.

== Reception ==
=== Critical response ===
Derek Elley of Variety described Familia as a "largely entertaining feature debut". He praised the casting, but found the film uneven in the way it moved between comedy and drama.

Dan Fainaru of Screen Daily described the film as a "cheerful debut" and a "pleasant diversion", writing that it was likely to work well with festival and family audiences. He praised Macha Grenon’s performance as Janine, but found that the plot weakened in the middle and that the ending failed to connect with what came before.

=== Awards and recognition ===
Archambault won the 2005 Claude Jutra Award for best feature film by a first-time Canadian director. The film also shared the Best Canadian First Feature Film award at the 2005 Toronto International Film Festival. In December 2005, it was named to the Toronto International Film Festival's annual Canada's Top Ten list of the year's best films.
