= Inch'Allah (film) =

- Directed by: Anaïs Barbeau-Lavalette
- Written by: Anaïs Barbeau-Lavalette
- Produced by: Luc Déry; Kim McCraw; Stephen Traynor
- Starring: Evelyne Brochu; Sabrina Ouazani; Sivan Levy; Yousef Sweid
- Cinematography: Philippe Lavalette
- Edited by: Sophie Leblond
- Music by: Levon Minassian
- Distributed by: E1 Films Canada
- Release date: September 8, 2012 (Toronto International Film Festival)
- Country: Canada
- Languages: French; Arabic; Hebrew; English

Inch'Allah is a Canadian drama film, released in 2012. Written and directed by Anaïs Barbeau-Lavalette, the film stars Evelyne Brochu as Chloé, a Canadian medical doctor with the Red Crescent. Splitting her time between her clinic in Ramallah, West Bank and Jerusalem, Chloé finds her loyalties torn as she witnesses the effects of the Israeli-Palestinian conflict on her friends, colleagues and patients on both sides of the border. At the 1st Canadian Screen Awards, Inch'Allah received five nominations, including Best Motion Picture.

== Plot ==
A street cafe in Israel is bombed. Chloé (Evelyne Brochu) is a young Canadian obstetrician who works at a Red Crescent clinic in Ramallah, West Bank, but lives in Jerusalem. Her Israeli friend Ava, who is a soldier in the Israel Defense Forces, lives in the same building. While commuting by bus between her apartment and Ramallah, Chloé passes through checkpoints on a daily basis. One of Chloé's patients is a pregnant Palestinian woman named Rand (Sabrina Ouazani), whose husband Ziad is in an Israeli prison awaiting trial. Chloé also befriends Rand's older brother Faysal (Yousef Sweid), younger brother Safi (Hammoudeh Akarmi), and mother Soraïda (Zorah Benali). Faysal works at a print shop that produces Palestinian propaganda posters.

After gunmen open fire on the nearby Beit Shomron Israeli settlement wounding two civilians, Israeli soldiers round up and question the men in the refugee camp. Back in Jerusalem, Ava confides in Chloé about her unease with the dehumanizing aspects of checkpoint duty but is unable to quit her job. Later, Chloé spends time with Rand and Safi, who are rummaging for supplies in a rubbish dump near the separation barrier. One of the local children tries to attack an armored Israeli truck but is run over and killed. The boy is later lauded as a martyr during a funeral procession.

The boy's death has an effect on Chloé and she confronts Ava about the disproportionate attention given by the Israeli authorities towards the settlement shooting. Ava is defensive and responds that the two settlers were seriously wounded. While spending time with Faysal and Rand's family in Ramallah, Chloé learns about the effects of the Israeli military occupation. As their friendship grows, Chloé becomes more sympathetic to her Palestinian hosts and helps Faysal plaster propaganda posters.

Chloé also convinces Ava to issue Faysal and Rand's family with a travel pass to visit Soraïda's ruined former village. While Soraïda is grateful, Faysal is bitter towards Chloé for reminding them of what his family has lost. Later, Chloé and Ava visit a night club in Tel Aviv. The following morning, Chloé learns that Rand has entered into labor and rushes back to Ramallah. Chloé and her Palestinian hosts try to reach a local hospital but are obstructed by an Israeli checkpoint. As a result, Rand is forced to give birth at the back of their van and her infant son dies.

Rand is distraught by the loss of her son and news that her husband Ziad has been sentenced by an Israeli military court to a 25-year term. Rand is bitter towards Chloé and blames her for the death of her child. A guilt-ridden and dejected Chloé returns to Jerusalem. Chloé crosses the checkpoint carrying a backpack which is delivered to a man in a bus. Later on, a suicide attack takes place in a crowded street cafe; tying the climax to the exposition. Following the attack, Chloé visits Faysal's photocopying shop in Ramallah and learns that Rand had perpetrated the suicide bombing and become a "shahid." While Chloé reads Rand's farewell letter, the denouement is interspersed with footage of Safi playing by the separation barrier and imagining a growing tree.

== Cast ==
- Evelyne Brochu as Chloé
- Sabrina Ouazani as Rand
- Sivan Levy as Ava
- Yousef Sweid as Faysal
- Hammoudeh Alkarmi as Safi
- Zorah Benali as Soraïda
- Carlo Brandt as Michael
- Marie-Thérèse Fortin as Elaine
- Ahmad Massad as Imad
- Yoav Donat as Checkpoint soldier
- Claire Vieth as Orthodox Wife #3

== Production ==
Director Anaïs Barbeau-Lavalette submitted the screenplay to micro_scope producers Kim McCraw and Luc Déry, with McCraw saying she and Dery were initially reluctant to take on a second complicated project in the Middle East after Incendies (2010), but the issue in the screenplay was important enough that it should not be ignored. McCraw personally went to Jordan to work on the film.

== Reception ==
University of Berlin film scholar Claudia Kotte wrote the film, along with Incendies (2010), Monsieur Lazhar (2011) and War Witch (2012), represent a break in the Cinema of Quebec from focus on local history to global concerns. Authors Gada Mahrouse, Chantal Maillé and Daniel Salée wrote McCraw and Déry's films, Incendies, Monsieur Lazhar and Inch'Allah, depict Quebec as part of the global village and as accepting minorities, particularly Middle Easterners or "Muslim Others".

=== Accolades ===
Barbeau-Lavalette was named artist of the year for 2012 by Les Artistes pour la paix, a Montreal-based organization that honours works of art involving themes of peace, in February 2013.

Award	Date of ceremony	Category	Recipient(s)	Result	Ref(s)
Berlin International Film Festival	7–17 February 2013	FIPRESCI Prize		Won	
Canadian Screen Awards	3 March 2013	Best Motion Picture	Luc Déry, Kim McCraw and Stephen Traynor	Nominated	
Canadian Screen Awards	3 March 2013	Best Actress	Evelyne Brochu	Nominated	
Canadian Screen Awards	3 March 2013	Best Supporting Actress	Sabrina Ouazani	Nominated	
Canadian Screen Awards	3 March 2013	Best Cinematography	Philippe Lavalette	Nominated	
Canadian Screen Awards	3 March 2013	Best Editing	Sophie Leblond	Nominated	
Jutra Awards	17 March 2013	Best Film	Luc Déry, Kim McCraw and micro_scope	Nominated	
Jutra Awards	17 March 2013	Best Supporting Actress	Sabrina Ouazani	Won	
Jutra Awards	17 March 2013	Best Art Direction	André-Line Beauparlant	Nominated	
Jutra Awards	17 March 2013	Best Editing	Sophie Leblond	Nominated	
Jutra Awards	17 March 2013	Best Costume Design	Sophie Lefebvre	Nominated	
Jutra Awards	17 March 2013	Best Sound	Sylvain Bellemare, Jean Umansky and Jean-Paul Hurier	Nominated	
Jutra Awards	23 March 2014	Most Successful Film Outside Quebec	Anaïs Barbeau-Lavalette	Nominated	
