= Anaïs Barbeau-Lavalette =

Canadian actress, film director and screenwriter

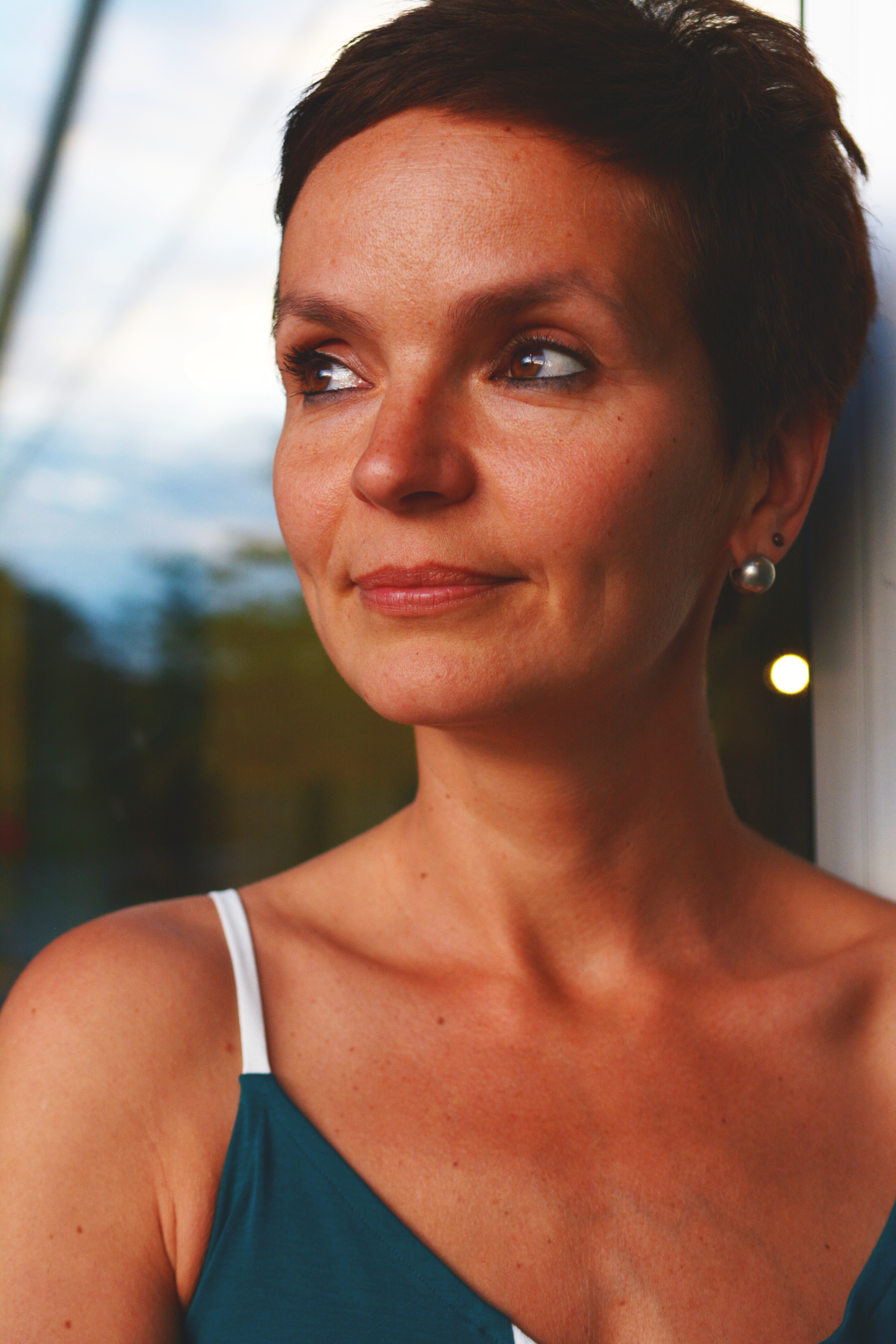
- Barbeau-Lavalette in 2015
- Born: 1979 (age 46–47); Montreal, Quebec, Canada
- Occupations: Novelist, film director, screenwriter
- Parent(s): Manon Barbeau; Philippe Lavalette
- Relatives: Marcel Barbeau (paternal grandfather)

Anaïs Barbeau-Lavalette (born 1979) is a Canadian novelist, film director, and screenwriter from Quebec. Her films are known for their "organic, participatory feel." Barbeau-Lavalette is the daughter of filmmaker Manon Barbeau and cinematographer Philippe Lavalette, and the granddaughter of artist Marcel Barbeau.

Originally prominent as a child actor, her credits included the series Le Club des 100 Watts and À nous deux!. She later began making documentary films, including Les Petits princes des bidonvilles (2000), Buenos Aires, no llores (2001) and Si j'avais un chapeau (2005), before releasing her first feature film, The Ring, in 2007. In 2010, she also published Je voudrais qu'on m'efface (translated as Neighbourhood Watch), a novel which revolves around some of the same characters as The Ring. In 2015, her second novel, La femme qui fuit (translated as Suzanne), inspired by the life of her grandmother, artist Suzanne Meloche, was short-listed for the 2016 Governor General's Award for French-language fiction, in addition to winning a number of other prizes and being a best-seller.

Barbeau-Lavalette is best known to international audiences for her award-winning 2012 film Inch'Allah.

== Early life ==
Barbeau-Lavalette was born on February 8, 1979, in Montreal, the daughter of Manon Barbeau, a filmmaker and director, and Philippe Lavalette, a cinematographer. She is the granddaughter of the Canadian artist Marcel Barbeau, who studied under Paul-Émile Borduas, and is known for being one of the first non-figurative painters in Canada.

As a young adult, Barbeau-Lavalette lived and studied in the occupied West Bank area.

In 2000, after finishing her first full-length documentary, Les Petits princes des bidonvilles (2000), Barbeau-Lavalette enrolled at the Université de Montréal, where she majored in International Studies. She then went on to study Film Production at the INIS. Following her time at INIS, Barbeau-Lavalette travelled to Ramallah, Palestine to attend Birzeit University.

== Film career ==
=== Documentaries ===
Barbeau-Lavalette started her film career as a documentary director. Following a year spent in Honduras, Barbeau-Lavalette directed Les Petits princes des bidonvilles (2000), which followed young Hondurans growing up in Montreal. In 2002, Anaïs Barbeau-Lavalette represented Canada in the United Nations Volunteers' Odyssey (Odyssée du voluntarist), in which she traveled the world creating 15 short documentaries on the theme of volunteerism.

On her return, Barbeau-Lavalette directed more documentaries, including the features Si j'avais un chapeau (2005), which detailed the lives of children across four different countries, and Tap-Tap, a "poetic portrait of Montreal's Haitian community."

=== Fiction features ===
In 2007, her debut fiction The Ring came out and was received warmly by critics. Her second fiction feature film, Inch'Allah, has become her most recognizable piece of work.

Her 2020 film, Goddess of the Fireflies (La déesse des mouches à feu), is an adaptation of the novel by Geneviève Pettersen.

In 2022, she released White Dog (Chien blanc), an adaptation of Romain Gary's 1970 novel White Dog.

=== Short films ===
Barbeau-Lavalette has created many short films spanning across different mediums and genres. Barbeau-Lavalette directed and shot 15 documentary short films during her time with the United Nations' Volunteers' Odyssey, and has continued to release short films throughout her career.

Her filmography includes such short films as Seven Hours Three Times A Year (2012), Ina Litovski (2012), and an 11-minute animated short film, Take Me (2014).

=== Videoclips ===
Barbeau-Lavalette is part of the Wapikoni Mobile audiovisual adventure. Through this Barbeau-Lavalette has directed videoclips for musicians, including Canadian singers Catherine Major and Thomas Hellman and hip hop artists Samian and Dramatik.

== Themes ==
Freedom and women's emancipation

- In her best-selling book La femme qui fuit (Suzanne, 2015), Anaïs Barbeau-Lavalette recounts the story of her grandmother, who abandoned her children. The quest for freedom and the difficulty of escaping social and family constraints are central themes in the work. Women's emancipation is explored through Suzanne Meloche, who chose to flee in order to live according to her own choices.
- Nos Héroïnes (2018) is a children's book illustrated by Mathilde Cinq-Mars, which features forty portraits of women who were members of Quebec's first women's sports club, the Club des archères de Montréal. In secret, these passionate, free-spirited, and strong women would meet near Sainte-Catherine Street in Montreal, and the book explores the freedom and emancipation of women through these forgotten figures. Anaïs Barbeau-Lavalette explains that she wanted to bring female role models to the Quebec landscape so that younger generations could use these portraits as inspiration, and at the same time enable the creation of a more equitable and representative society.

Childhood and youth

- Le Ring (The ring, 2007) is Anaïs Barbeau-Lavalette's first feature film. It portrays a 12-year-old boy living in a disadvantaged neighborhood of Montreal. Through the child, the director also symbolizes themes such as loneliness, street violence, and the loss of innocence.
- Les petits géants (2008) is a documentary co-directed with Émile Proulx-Cloutier filmed in Montreal elementary schools, focusing on children experiencing family or school difficulties.
- Inch'Allah (2012) is a feature-length fiction film largely inspired by the documentary techniques acquired by the director. The film is set in the midst of the Israeli-Palestinian conflict and features Chloé, a young doctor from Quebec who lives in Jerusalem and works in a Palestinian refugee camp in the West Bank.
- La déesse des mouches à feu (2020) is an adaptation of the novel by Geneviève Pettersen. It follows Catherine, played by Kelly Depeault, a teenager in the 1990s in Chicoutimi. Rebellious adolescence, sexuality, friendship, and rebuilding are the main themes of the film.

Memory and identity

- In several of her works, Anaïs Barbeau-Lavalette revisits the stories of several prominent female figures in Quebec, such as her literary work La Femme qui fuit (Suzanne), based on the story of her maternal grandmother. Her grandmother, Suzanne Meloche, was an Ontario poet and visual artist who abandoned her children (including Anaïs Barbeau-Lavalette's mother, Manon Barbeau). Through the reconstruction of her grandmother's life, the theme of abandonment is central to the work.
- Expected in 2026, Anaïs Barbeau-Lavalette is preparing a feature film about the life of Pauline Julien, a successful Quebec singer, songwriter, and artist.

== Bibliography ==
- Je voudrais qu'on m'efface, Éditions Hurtubise, 2010
- Embrasser Yasser Arafat, Éditions Marchand de feuilles, 2011
- La Femme qui fuit, Éditions Marchand de feuilles (Québec) et Livre de poche (France), 2015
- Nos héroïnes, Éditions Marchand de feuilles, 2018
- Femme Forêt, Éditions Marchand de feuilles (Québec) et Éditions JC Lattès (France), 2021
- Femme Fleuve, Éditions Marchand de feuilles, 2022
- Nos fleurs, Éditions Marchand de feuilles, 2023
- Zones sacrifiées (essai collectif), Éditions du Quartz, 2025

== Filmography ==
- Les Petits Princes des bidonvilles - 2000
- Si j'avais un chapeau - 2006
- Tap-Tap - 2007
- The Ring (Le Ring) - 2007
- The Little Giants (Les Petits Géants) - 2008, co-directed with Émile Proulx-Cloutier
- Remembering the Ashes: Incendies Through Their Eyes (Se souvenir des cendres) - 2010
- Seven Hours Three Times Per Year (Sept heures trois fois par année) - 2012, co-directed with André Turpin
- Ina Litovski - 2012, co-directed with André Turpin
- Inch'allah - 2012
- Take Me (Prends-moi) - 2014, co-directed with André Turpin
- Solid Ground (Le Plancher des vaches) - 2014, co-directed with Émile Proulx-Cloutier
- My Daughter Is Not for Sale (Ma fille n'est pas à vendre) - 2016
- Goddess of the Fireflies (La Déesse des mouches à feu) - 2020
- White Dog (Chien blanc) - 2022
- Pauline (Pauline Julien: femme pays) - 2026

== Theater ==
- Pas perdus: documentaires scéniques, Co-conception avec Émile Proulx-Cloutier, Centre du Théâtre d'Aujourd'hui, 2022‑2025
- Pôle Sud: documentaires scéniques, Co-conception avec Émile Proulx-Cloutier, Espace Libre, 2016
- Vrais Mondes: documentaires scéniques, Co-conception avec Émile Proulx-Cloutier, 5e Salle de La Place des Arts, 2014

== Awards and nominations ==
Si j'avais un chapeau (2005) was nominated for the "Best Social Documentary and Best Research" at the Prix Gémeaux in 2006. Her feature film, Le Ring (2007) was extremely well received by critics. The critically acclaimed film, was chosen in the Pusan and Berlin film festivals in 2008. Le Ring received international awards including the New Talent Grand Prize and the Golden Lion Award at Taipei Film Festival, the Special Jury Award at Vladivostok Film Festival in Russia, and the Best Director Award at Miradas Madrid Film Festival.

A peace, human rights and international development activist, Barbeau-Lavalette was named artist of the year for 2012 by Les Artistes pour la paix, a Montreal-based organization that honors works of art involving themes of peace, in February 2013. In the same month, Inch'Allah was awarded the FIPRESCI Prize for the Panorama section of the 2013 Berlin International Film Festival.

== Awards (list) ==
=== Films ===
- 2023 – Screenplay Award at the Festival International du film de Mons, Chien Blanc
- 2023 – Citizen's Eye Award at the Festival International du film de Mons, Chien Blanc
- 2020 – Iris Best Direction, La Déesse des mouches à feu
- 2020 – Iris Best Film, La Déesse des mouches à feu
- 2015 – Jury ARRQ Award at Prix Prends ça court, Prends-moi
- 2015 – Audience Award at Tempere International Film Festival, Prends-moi
- 2015 – Special Mention Edward Snowden Award at Festival Signes de Nuit, Prends-moi
- 2015 – Jury Public Adults Award, Mention Senior Jury Award at Longue vue sur le court, Prends-moi
- 2014 – Grand Public Prize at Festival Images en vue, Prends-moi
- 2014 – Best Short Award at Gijon International Film Festival, Prends-moi
- 2013 – Best Sound, Post Modern Prize, Best Actress, Air Canada Prize, Spirafilm Prize at Prix Prends ça court, Ina Litovski
- 2012 – Ecumenical Jury Prize, Inch'allah
- 2012 – Fipresci International Critics Award, Inch'allah
- 2010 – Gémeaux, Best Cultural Documentary, Les Petits Géants
- 2010 – Gémeaux, Best Documentary, Se souvenir des cendres
- 2009 – Jutra, Best Music, Le Ring
- 2006 – Gémeaux Nomination, Best Research, Si j'avais un chapeau
- 2001 – Public Award at Festival Muestra Cultural de Montréal, Les Petits Princes des bidonvilles
- 2001 – Best Short Documentary Award at Festival de Cherbourg, Les Petits Princes des bidonvilles

=== Literature ===
- 2016 – Canada Reads, Finalist, La Femme qui fuit
- 2016 – Montreal Library Award, La Femme qui fuit
- 2016 – Grand Prize of the City of Montreal, La Femme qui fuit
- 2016 – France-Québec Award, La Femme qui fuit
- 2016 – Quebec Booksellers Award, La Femme qui fuit
- 2016 – Governor General's Award, Finalist, La Femme qui fuit

=== Theater ===
- 2022 – Best Show Award presented by the Association of Critics for the 2021‑2022 season, Pas perdus: documentaires scéniques
- 2016 – Medal of the National Assembly presented by Françoise David to Anaïs Barbeau-Lavalette and Émile Proulx-Cloutier for their social engagement and contribution to Québec culture

=== Honorary Distinctions ===
- 2024 – Chevalière of the Ordre de la Pléiade, international distinction for contribution to the Francophonie
- 2023 – Honorary Doctorate awarded by Université du Québec en Outaouais for her contribution to human rights and environmental protection
- 2012 – Named Artist for Peace
- 2010 – FCTMN Laureate, Women in Film, Television and Digital Media
