= Joanna Rakoff =

American memoirist and novelist (b. 1972)

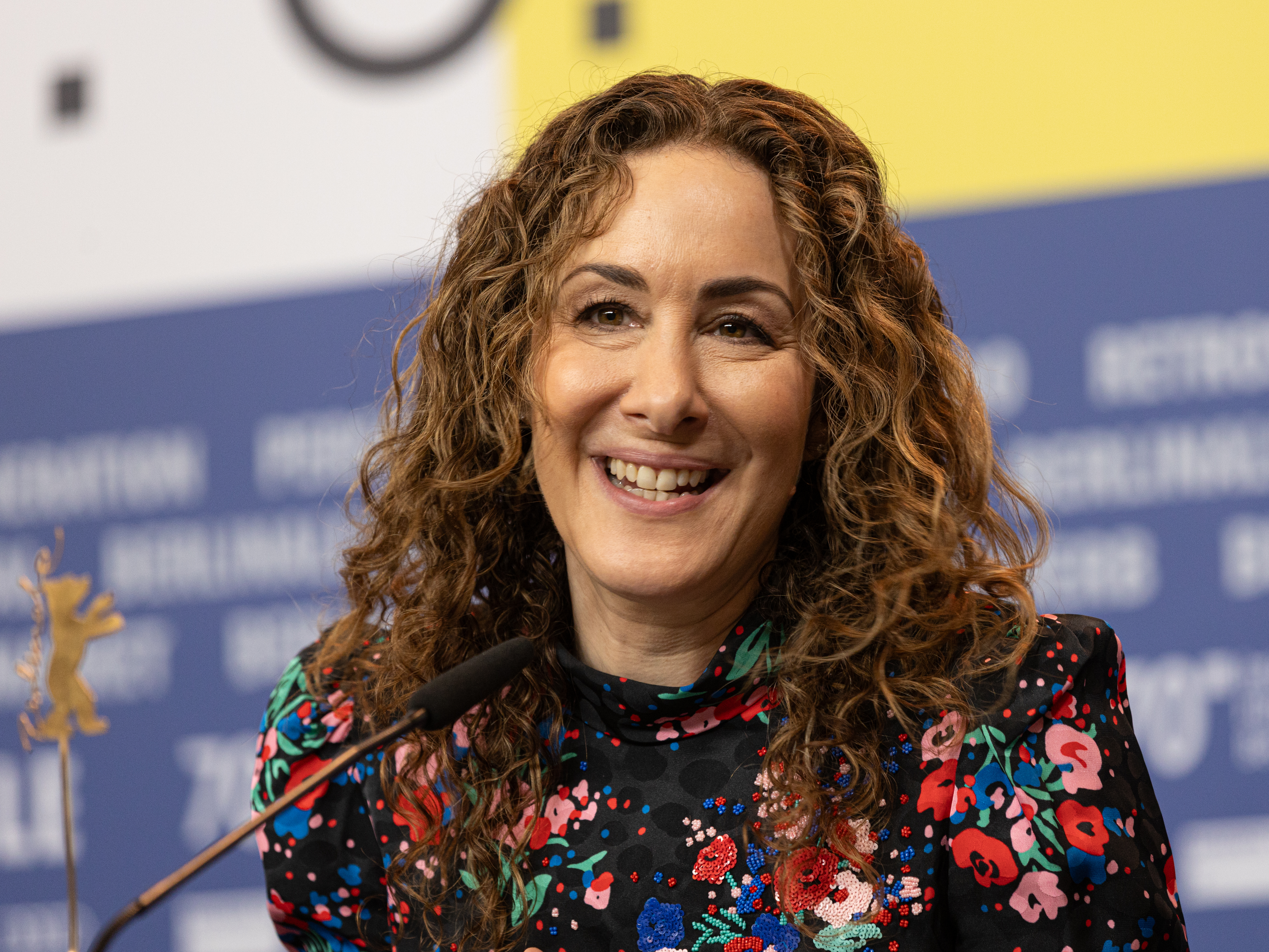
- Rakoff in 2020
- Born: May 8, 1972 (age 54); Nyack, New York, U.S.
- Education: Oberlin College; University College London (MA); CUNY Graduate Center; Columbia University (MFA)
- Occupations: Novelist; memoirist
- Spouse: Keeril Makan
- Children: 3
- Website: www.joannarakoff.com

Joanna Rakoff (born May 8, 1972) is an American novelist and memoirist.

== Early life ==
Rakoff was born in Nyack, New York, in 1972.

== Education ==
Between 1990 and 1994, Rakoff studied English literature at Oberlin College in Ohio. Between 1994 and 1995, she completed an MA in English literature at UCL in London. In 1996 and 1997, she did a year of Ph.D. coursework in English literature at CUNY Graduate Center, before dropping out to study writing at Columbia University, where she completed her MFA in 1998.

== Life and career ==
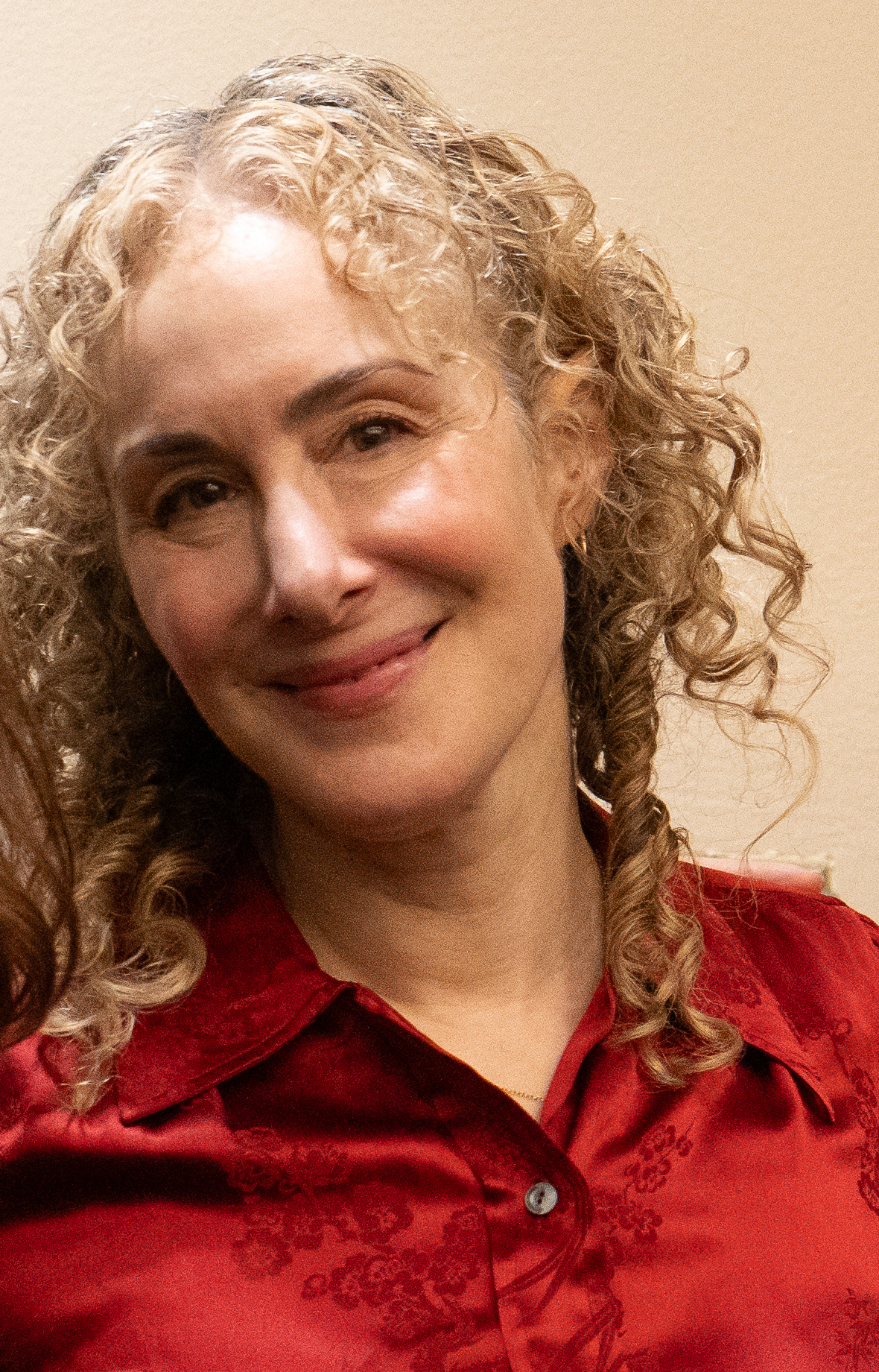
Rakoff at AWP 2026

In 1996, aged 23, Rakoff took a job at one of New York's oldest literary agencies, Harold Ober Associates. Unbeknownst to Rakoff, the agency looked after the interests of the notoriously reclusive writer J. D. Salinger. In her time at the agency Rakoff's responsibilities included responding to the large volume of fan mail Salinger received. Rakoff was instructed to give a generic response that explained that Salinger did not read fan mail. But she found herself moved by the letters and began writing personal responses to their letters. Her period at the agency coincided with the aborted publication of Salinger's short story "Hapworth 16, 1924". Rakoff's experiences with the agency and encounters with Salinger himself are recounted in her 2014 memoir of her time at the agency, My Salinger Year.

Rakoff's first novel, A Fortunate Age, was published in 2009. It received largely positive reviews, was included on many Best of 2009 lists, including NPR, Elle, and Booklist, and received the Goldberg Prize for Jewish Fiction by Emerging Writers, an award previously won by Gary Shteyngart, Nathan Englander, and Laura Vapnyar. The novel was a San Francisco Chronicle Best Seller and was published in France by Presses de la Cité.

In 2010, Rakoff created a radio documentary about Salinger and his fan mail for BBC Radio 4, Hey Mr Salinger. Before it aired, the script was circulated in the British publishing industry; an editor read it and encouraged Rakoff to expand it into a memoir about her time working for the agency. This memoir became Rakoff's second book, My Salinger Year, published in 2014 to broad critical acclaim. It was picked by The Guardian's Rachel Cooke as one of the best books of 2014. It has been published in France, Italy, Spain, the Netherlands, Brazil, Argentina, India, Australia, and the UK. In France, it was a finalist for the Elle Prix de Lectrices. In the Netherlands, it was a finalist for the WIZO Prize.

The book was turned into a 2020 Canadian film of the same name starring Margaret Qualley as Rakoff and Sigourney Weaver as her boss, directed by Philippe Falardeau. It opened the 70th Berlin International Film Festival. The film had its first theatrical release in Australia in January 2021. In March 2021, it opened in the U.S., where it was released by IFC, followed by a May release in the UK, and releases around the world.

Before publishing A Fortunate Age, Rakoff worked as a freelance literary journalist and critic, contributing to the Los Angeles Times, the San Francisco Chronicle, Newsday, the Guardian, and the New York Times, as well as magazines like Vogue, Marie Claire, and O, The Oprah Magazine. For many years, she served as a contributing editor for the literary trade magazine Poets & Writers, where she wrote a long-running column "First", featuring debut writers, as well as profiles of writers such as T. C. Boyle and Jonathan Franzen. In 2004, she became the books editor of a new online arts and culture magazine, Tablet, then known as Nextbook. In 2005, she was promoted to features editor, and from 2006 to 2008 she served as editor-in-chief.

Rakoff is under contract with Little, Brown for a new memoir, The Fifth Passenger, which excavates a difficult family secret. The story of this memoir is recounted on the 10/21/2019 episode of Dani Shapiro's podcast Family Secrets. She regularly contributes book reviews to The New York Times, the Los Angeles Times, and Vogue.

== Personal life ==
Rakoff lives in Cambridge, Massachusetts, with her husband, the composer Keeril Makan, a professor at MIT. She has three children.

== Bibliography ==
- A Fortunate Age. New York: Scribner, 2009. ISBN 9781416590804.
- My Salinger Year. New York: Knopf Doubleday Publishing Group, 2014. ISBN 9780307958006.
