= Ina Litovski =

2012 Canadian short film

- Film poster
- Directed by: Anaïs Barbeau-Lavalette; André Turpin
- Written by: Anaïs Barbeau-Lavalette; André Turpin
- Produced by: Stéphanie Verrier
- Starring: Marine Johnson; Geneviève Alarie
- Cinematography: André Turpin
- Edited by: Elric Robichon
- Production company: Les Productions Flow
- Release date: August 10, 2012 (Locarno)
- Running time: 11 minutes
- Country: Canada
- Language: French

Ina Litovski is a Canadian short drama film directed by Anaïs Barbeau-Lavalette and André Turpin, released in 2012. The film stars Marine Johnson as Sophie, a young music student preparing for her school violin recital, and struggling to convince her agoraphobic mother (Geneviève Alarie) to overcome her fears and attend the performance.

The film premiered in August 2012 at the Locarno Festival. It was a Canadian Screen Award nominee for Best Live Action Short Drama at the 2nd Canadian Screen Awards in 2014.
