= My Salinger Year =

2020 film directed by Philippe Falardeau

- Official poster
- Directed by: Philippe Falardeau
- Screenplay by: Philippe Falardeau
- Based on: My Salinger Year by Joanna Rakoff
- Produced by: Kim McCraw; Luc Déry
- Starring: Margaret Qualley; Sigourney Weaver; Douglas Booth; Seána Kerslake; Colm Feore; Brían F. O'Byrne
- Cinematography: Sara Mishara
- Edited by: Mary Finlay
- Music by: Martin Léon
- Production companies: micro_scope; Parallel Films; Next Wednesday Films; Telefilm Canada; Screen Ireland; Crave
- Distributed by: Mongrel Media (Canada); Vertigo Releasing (Ireland)
- Release dates: February 20, 2020 (Berlinale); March 5, 2021 (Canada); May 21, 2021 (Ireland)
- Running time: 101 minutes
- Countries: Canada; Ireland
- Language: English
- Box office: $347,711

My Salinger Year (also known as My New York Year) is a 2020 drama film written and directed by Philippe Falardeau, based upon the memoir of the same name by Joanna Rakoff. It stars Margaret Qualley, Sigourney Weaver, Douglas Booth, Seána Kerslake, Colm Feore and Brían F. O'Byrne.

Recent college grad Joanna spends a year in a menial clerical job working for the renowned and reclusive writer J.D. Salinger's literary agent.

The film had its world premiere at the 70th Berlin International Film Festival on February 20, 2020. It was released in Canada and the United States on March 5, 2021, by Mongrel Media and IFC Films, respectively, and in Ireland on May 21, 2021, by Vertigo Releasing.

== Plot ==
In 1995, Joanna, an aspiring writer and poet, leaves her boyfriend Karl and her home in Berkeley, California to visit her friend in New York City. However, she soon moves there, where she takes a job at one of New York's oldest literary agencies. Unbeknownst to Joanna, the agency looks after the interests of the reclusive writer J. D. Salinger. She has not read any of Salinger's books, not even The Catcher in the Rye.

Agency head Margaret does not believe that computers are helpful, so makes Joanna type letters for her on a typewriter. The friend who originally let her stay with her and her boyfriend tells her she has outstayed her welcome. So Joanna moves into an apartment with her new boyfriend Don.

In her time at the agency, Joanna's responsibilities include responding to the large volume of fan mail that Salinger is sent. As is agency policy, Joanna responds with a generic response to explain that Salinger does not read fan mail. However, she is tempted to give a proper reply to some of Salinger's fans.

Believing she was doing her a favor, Joanna responds to a teen who had begged for a personalized response so her teacher would give her an A. However, the teen bursts into the office, angered that getting his letter put her in summer school. Hugh gets wind of it, taking the task of handling Salinger's fan letters from her. Upset, Joanna unthinkingly blurts out that it is Margaret's fault she lost the chance to publish Judy Blume's first book in years.

Joanna's period at the agency coincides with Salinger's proposed publication of the short story "Hapworth 16, 1924", which had previously been published in The New Yorker. Joanna helps liaise with the small publisher, going to Georgetown University for a meeting between Salinger and the publisher. Although not allowed to meet Salinger, so as to maintain his reclusivity, she debriefs the publisher on their protocols both before and after their meeting.

As the meeting coincides with a concert her former boyfriend Karl is performing in Washington, D.C., he tells Joanna he misses her. Having known each other for years, he was hurt she just ghosted him, rather than talking about it. Joanna also has missed their connection, but does not say so.

Returning to NYC, Joanna learns that Margaret's bipolar partner Daniel committed suicide in her apartment while she was in the other room. Margaret starts to trust her more and lets her read some manuscripts and articles.

Don and Joanna are invited to the wedding of Don's best friend, but he does not tell her, wanting to go on his own. She finds out accidentally when the couple mention it at a party. As his old friends will be there, Don says he does not want to 'babysit' her. While he is away, Joanna decides to leave him and moves out.

Just as Margaret promotes her for successfully selling a first book for the agency, Joanna gives her notice, but stays on until a replacement is found. Meanwhile, she is able to take over the lease of her original apartment as her friend leaves the city. Joanna submits poems to The New Yorker, and finally meets Salinger in person.

== Cast ==
- Margaret Qualley as Joanna
- Sigourney Weaver as Margaret
- Douglas Booth as Don
- Seána Kerslake as Jenny
- Brían F. O'Byrne as Hugh
- Colm Feore as Daniel
- Arthur Holden as Dean
- Théodore Pellerin as Boy from Winston-Salem
- Yanic Truesdale as Max
- Hamza Haq as Karl
- Leni Parker as Pam
- Ellen David as Placement Agent
- Romane Denis as Girl Who Wants an A
- Tim Post as J. D. Salinger
- Gavin Drea as Mark
- Matt Holland as Clifford Bradbury
- Hayley Kezber as Rachel Cusk

== Production ==
The film is based on Rakoff's 2014 memoir depicting her time working at literary agency Harold Ober Associates, which represented Salinger. Phyllis Westberg (a character called Margaret in the film) was Salinger's agent at the time that Rakoff was at the agency, and Westberg took over running the agency in 1998.

In February 2019, Margaret Qualley and Sigourney Weaver joined the cast of the film, with Philippe Falardeau directing from a screenplay he wrote. Qualley was to star as Rakoff and Weaver as Margaret, Rakoff's boss. Kim McCraw, Susan Mullen, Luc Déry and Ruth Coady served as producers under their micro_scope and Parallel Films banner, respectively. In May 2019, Colm Feore, Seána Kerslake and Théodore Pellerin joined the cast of the film, with Mongrel Media and Thunderbird Releasing distributing in Canada and Ireland; principal photography began that month in Montreal.

== Release ==
The film had its world premiere at the 70th Berlin International Film Festival on February 20, 2020. Shortly after, IFC Films acquired distribution rights to the film. It was released in Canada and the United States on March 5, 2021, by Mongrel Media and IFC Films, respectively. In Ireland, the film was released on May 17, 2021, by Vertigo Releasing.

== Reception ==
=== Critical response ===
Rotten Tomatoes collected 84 reviews and identified 71% of them as positive, giving the film an average rating of 6.3/10. According to Metacritic, which sampled 18 critics and calculated a weighted average score of 50 out of 100, the film received "mixed or average reviews".

Gary Goldstein of the Los Angeles Times gave the film a positive review, writing: "Joanna's journey of creative and emotional enlightenment, is managed with grace, tenderness and touching credibility by a wonderfully winning Qualley in concert with Philippe Falardeau's smart, engaging direction and screenplay." Kevin Maher of The Sunday Times also gave the film a positive review writing: "But really it's a movie, essentially familiar in structure and tone, that owes everything to a pair of knockout performances. It's a casting triumph."

On the other hand, Peter Bradshaw of The Guardian panned the film, awarding it one out of five stars and calling it a "bafflingly insipid, zestless, derivative film – a simperingly coy knock-off of The Devil Wears Prada without the sexiness and fun."

=== Awards and nominations ===
Award	Date of ceremony	Category	Recipient(s)	Result	Ref(s)
Canadian Screen Awards	May 20, 2021	Best Costume Design	Patricia McNeil, Ann Roth	Nominated	
Canadian Screen Awards	May 20, 2021	Best Hairstyling	Michelle Côté	Won	
Prix Iris	June 6, 2021	Best Film	Luc Déry, Kim McCraw, Ruth Coady, Susan Mullen	Nominated	
Prix Iris	June 6, 2021	Best Director	Philippe Falardeau	Nominated	
Prix Iris	June 6, 2021	Best Actress	Margaret Qualley	Nominated	
Prix Iris	June 6, 2021	Best Supporting Actress	Sigourney Weaver	Nominated	
Prix Iris	June 6, 2021	Best Screenplay	Philippe Falardeau	Nominated	
Prix Iris	June 6, 2021	Best Art Direction	Élise de Blois, Claude Tremblay	Nominated	
Prix Iris	June 6, 2021	Best Cinematography	Sara Mishara	Nominated	
Prix Iris	June 6, 2021	Best Costume Design	Patricia McNeil, Ann Roth	Nominated	
Prix Iris	June 6, 2021	Best Hair	Michelle Côté	Nominated	
Prix Iris	June 6, 2021	Best Original Music	Martin Léon	Won	
Prix Iris	June 6, 2021	Most Successful Film Outside Quebec	Philippe Falardeau, Kim McCraw, Luc Déry	Nominated	
