= Manon Barbeau =

Canadian film director and screenwriter

Manon Barbeau CM OQ
- Born: 8 May 1949 (age 76); Montreal, Quebec, Canada
- Occupation(s): Filmmaker, director, writer, general director of Wapikoni Mobile
- Partner: Philippe Lavalette
- Children: Anaïs Barbeau-Lavalette Manuel Barbeau-Lavalette
- Parent(s): Marcel Barbeau; Suzanne Meloche

Manon Barbeau CM OQ (born 1949) is a Québécois filmmaker and co-founder of Wapikoni Mobile, an organisation that helps First Nations youth learn the art of filmmaking. In 2006, she also founded Musique nomade, which provides recording studios to First Nations musicians. She has been Wapikoni Mobile’s general director since 2004. In 2021, Manon Barbeau has been elected president of the Cinémathèque québécoise.

== Personal life ==
Manon Barbeau was born in Montreal, Quebec, on May 8, 1949. Her father is painter and sculptor Marcel Barbeau and her mother, Suzanne Meloche, is a poet and painter. She and her partner, cinematographer Philippe Lavalette, have a daughter, Anaïs Barbeau-Lavalette, author and film director, and a son, Manuel Barbeau-Lavalette, educator.

While doing research in the archives of the Université de Montréal for her documentary, Les Enfants de Refus global, Barbeau found correspondence detailing her mother’s love affair with Paul-Émile Borduas, the dissolution of her parents’ romantic relationship, as well as evidence that they had abandoned her at the age of three.

== Career ==
Barbeau graduated in cinema and communications from the Université du Québec à Montréal (UQAM). She has written for TV and, in 1991, published a novel, Merlyne, with Boréal. For over thirty years, Barbeau has been working as a filmmaker, screenwriter and producer for numerous organizations, including Télé-Québec, the National Film Board of Canada, Vidéo Paradiso, La Maison des Cultures Nomades, Totam and Wapikoni Mobile. Barbeau was also president of the Documentary Network (L’Observatoire du Documentaire) from 2006 to 2008.

From 2010 to 2014, she was part of Culture Montréal’s Board of Directors, and in 2014 she was elected president of the organization. She has often spoken publicly about documentary filmmaking and Aboriginal youth at various events and venues including L’Art en Marge, organized by the Institut Universitaire en Santé Mentale de Québec, and at UNESCO for International Women’s Day in 2014.

== Wapikoni ==
Since 2004, Barbeau has been the general director of Wapikoni Mobile, a mobile film studio that travels to remote First Nations communities. The organization has been credited with providing Aboriginal youth with an outlet to express themselves, as well as the tools and skills to do so.

In 2010, UQAM’s faculty of communication and media offered Barbeau an award (Prix Reconnaissance UQAM) for her contributions to documentary filmmaking and her commitment to Aboriginal youth.

== Works ==
=== Documentaries ===
- 1975: Comptines : Director
- 1981: Nous sommes plusieur boucoup de monde : Director
- 1990: Le Marché du couple : Writer
- 1994: Tristan and Juliette or Love in the Year 2000 (Tristan et Juliette ou l’amour en l’an 2000) : Writer
- 1996: Les Enfants d’abord : Writer
- 1997: Raymond Lévesque - d’Amour et d’Amertume : Writer
- 1998: Les Enfants de Refus global : Director
- 1999: L'Armée de l'ombre : Director
- 2000: Barbeau, libre comme l’art : Director
- 2001: Alain, artiste-démolisseur : Director
- 2002: La Fin du mépris : Writer
- 2004: L'Amour en Pen : Director
- 2004: De mémoire de chats - Les Ruelles : Director
- 2005: Du bord des bêtes - VLB : Director
- 2010: Wapikoni - Escale à Kitcisaki : Participant

=== Films ===
- 1991: Un amour naissant : Writer
- 2007: Un cri au bonheur : Contributor

=== Fiction ===
- 1991: Merlyne: Author

== Awards ==
- 2003: Won five Prix Gémeaux from the Academy of Canadian Cinema and Television, immortalizing her as one of the academy's "Legends"
- 2006: Honoured at the Femmes du Cinéma, de la Télévision et des Nouveaux Médias (FCTNM) Gala for her body of work
- 2009: Elected as a Canadian Ashoka Fellow for civic engagement
- 2010: Prix Reconnaissance UQAM for her contributions to documentary filmmaking and her commitment to Aboriginal youth
- 2012: Nominated for the Prix de la Personalité Internationale de l’Année given by CÉRIUM
- 2012: Named ‘personality of the week’ by La Presse/Radio-Canada in April
- 2012: Prix Femmes d'Affaires, OBNL category, from the Réseau des Femmes d’Affaires du Québec
- 2012: PLURAL+ Honorable Mention Award for Wapikoni Mobile
- 2012: Telus Community Excellence Award
- 2014: Elected president of Culture Montreal’s Board of Directors
- 2014: Officer of the National Order of Quebec
- 2014: Prix Albert-Tessier
- 2016: Named a Member of the Order of Canada.
