= Jason Roy Léveillée =

Canadian actor (born 1983)

Jason Roy-Léveillée
- Born: October 1, 1983 (age 42); Saint-Quentin, New-Brunswick, Canada
- Other name: "Jay"
- Occupation: Actor
- Years active: 1996 – present

Jason Roy-Léveillée (born October 1, 1983 in Saint-Quentin, New-Brunswick) is a Canadian actor. He made his film debut with a minor part in Virginie (1996) when he was 13 years old.

== Early life ==
Son of Rino Roy and Pauline Léveillée was raised in Saint-Quentin, New Brunswick. He is of France, Spain and Britain descent. He graduated Sir Wilfrid Laurier School Board, Quebec High School and Université Laval. He is co-founder of Fanatic Film production in collaboration with Marie-Helene Jodoin.

== Profile ==
- Real Name Jason Roy-Léveillée
- Birthdate October 1, 1983
- Birthplace Saint-Quentin, New Brunswick, Canada
- Height 6'3'' (1.91m)

== Filmography ==
- 1996: Virginie - as Steve Ferron
- 2001: Ramdam - as Jean-Félix Beaupré
- 2002: Lance et Compte: La nouvelle génération - as Guy Lambert
- 2002: Maux d'amour - as Steve-Pierre Lawrence
- 2004: Lance et Compte: La reconquête - as Guy Lambert
- 2006: Lance et Compte: La revanche - as Guy Lambert
- 2007: Taking the Plunge (À vos marques... party!) - as Frédérick Bédard
- 2007: The Ring (Le Ring) - as Max
- 2008: Amandine Malabul - as Charlie Martur
- 2009: Taking the Plunge 2 (À vos marques... Party! 2) - as Frédérick Bédard (filming)
- 2009: Lance et Compte: Le grand duel - Guy Lambert
- 2011: La Run - Guillaume
