= Philippe Lavalette =

Canadian cinematographer

Philippe Lavalette is a Canadian cinematographer, writer and documentary filmmaker from Quebec. He is most noted for his work on the 2012 film Inch'Allah, for which he was a Canadian Screen Award nominee for Best Cinematography at the 1st Canadian Screen Awards in 2013.

His other film credits have included Twilight (La Brunante), Victoria, The Wolves (Les Loups), A Cargo to Africa, Shadow Men (Nos hommes dans l'ouest) and After the Odyssey (Au lendemain de l'odyssée).

In 2017 he published his debut novel, Petite Madeleine. He has also published La mesure du monde, a memoir of his career in film.

He is the husband of filmmaker Manon Barbeau, and the father of filmmaker and writer Anaïs Barbeau-Lavalette.
