= Luc Déry =

French Canadian film producer

Luc Déry is a French Canadian film producer. He was co-founder of the Montreal-based production company micro_scope, with Kim McCraw.

He is from Hull (Gatineau), Quebec, and studied film at the University of Montreal and arts management at York University.

With McCraw, Déry specialized in "smart, high-end pics designed to attract interest outside Canada". Their films Incendies (2010) and Monsieur Lazhar (2011) both won the Genie Award for Best Motion Picture, and both were nominated for the Academy Award for Best Foreign Language Film.

== Filmography ==
- The Left-Hand Side of the Fridge (La Moitié gauche du frigo) - 2000
- Soft Shell Man (Un crabe dans la tête) - 2001
- A Problem with Fear - 2003
- Tiresia - 2003
- Saved by the Belles - 2003
- Next: A Primer on Urban Painting - 2005
- Familia - 2005
- Congorama - 2006
- Continental, a Film Without Guns (Continental, un film sans fusil) - 2007
- It's Not Me, I Swear! (C'est pas moi, je le jure!) - 2008
- Incendies - 2010
- Monsieur Lazhar - 2011
- Familiar Grounds - 2011
- Inch'Allah - 2012
- You're Sleeping Nicole (Tu dors Nicole) - 2014
- My Internship in Canada (Guibord s'en va-t-en guerre) - 2015
- Allure - 2017
- For Those Who Don't Read Me (À tous ceux qui ne me lisent pas) - 2018
- My Salinger Year - 2020
- Drunken Birds (Les Oiseaux ivres) - 2021
- The Origin of Evil (L'Origine du mal) - 2022
- Lovely Day (Mille secrets mille dangers) - 2025

== Awards ==
- Best Film, Continental, a Film Without Guns (Continental, un film sans fusil), Jutra Awards (Quebec), 2008
- Best Film, Congorama, Jutra Awards (Quebec), 2007
- CFTPA Award, Producer of the Year, 2006
- Best Film, Soft Shell Man (Un crabe dans la tête), Jutra Awards (Quebec), 2002
