= Marchand de feuilles =

Canadian publishing house

Marchand de feuilles is an independent Canadian publishing house, founded in 2000 by Mélanie Vincelette. Headquartered in Old Montreal, Marchand de feuilles publishes a selection of books in French, which are distributed by Hachette Canada. The recipient of dozens of awards for its contributions to literature and publishing, Marchand de feuilles has published more than one hundred authors, poets and historians. The company's archives, including rare material from its founding and its early history, are held in the Youville Stables.

"Marchand de feuilles, is behind two of the greatest literary successes of the decade, La fiancée Americaine by Éric Dupont (60 000 copies sold) and La femme qui fuit (130 000 copies sold) by Anaïs Barbeau-Lavalette."

== Publications ==
- La fiancée américaine by Eric Dupont (Prix des libraries du Québec, Prix des Collégiens)
- La femme qui fuit by Anaïs Barbeau-Lavalette (Prix des libraires du Québec)
- HKPQ by Michèle Plomer (Prix France Québec)
- Sèna by Françosie de Luca (Shortlisted Governor General's Awards)
- Traité des peaux by Catherine Harton (Finalist Prix des Cinq Continents)
- Le phyto-analyste by Bertrand Busson (Grand Prix littéraire Archambault)
- Journal d'un étudiant en histoire de l'art by Maxime Olivier Moutier
- Douce détresse by Anna Leventhal
- Les filles peintes by Cathy Marie Buchanan
- L'Angoisse du paradis by Yann Fortier
- Dans sa bulle by Suzanne Myre
- Attends-moi by Arjun Basu
- Jardin sabiler by Michèle Plomer (Anne Hébert prize)
- Un vélo dans la tête by Mathieu Meunier
- Le géranium by Melinda Josie Mélanie Tellier (TD Canadana prize)
