= Kim McCraw =

Canadian film producer

- Born: 1968 or 1969 (age 57–58); Granby, Quebec, Canada
- Education: Cégep de Granby
- Occupations: Film producer Director's assistant

Kim McCraw (born c. 1969) is a Canadian film producer and co-founder of the Montreal-based production company micro_scope, with Luc Déry.

She was born in Granby, Quebec, and after graduating from Cégep de Granby became a director's assistant.

McCraw met Dery while working on a short film in Granby. It was in 2004 that she joined the micro_scope team as a producer, and subsequently became a co-shareholder. With Dery, McCraw specialized in "smart, high-end pics designed to attract interest outside Canada". Their films Incendies (2010) and Monsieur Lazhar (2011) both won the Genie Award for Best Motion Picture, and both were nominated for the Academy Award for Best Foreign Language Film. McCraw co-produced Inch'Allah and personally went to Jordan to work on the film. She later produced Gabrielle (2013), which competed at the Locarno Film Festival.

== Filmography ==
Her films include:

- Familia - 2005
- Congorama - 2006
- Continental, a Film Without Guns (Continental, un film sans fusil) - 2007
- It's Not Me, I Swear! (C'est pas moi, je le jure!) - 2008
- Incendies - 2010
- Monsieur Lazhar - 2011
- Familiar Grounds - 2011
- Inch'Allah - 2012
- Enemy - 2013
- You're Sleeping Nicole (Tu dors Nicole) - 2014
- My Internship in Canada (Guibord s'en va-t-en guerre) - 2015
- Allure - 2017
- For Those Who Don't Read Me (À tous ceux qui ne me lisent pas) - 2018
- My Salinger Year - 2020
- Drunken Birds (Les Oiseaux ivres) - 2021
- The Origin of Evil (L'Origine du mal) - 2022
- Lovely Day (Mille secrets mille dangers) - 2025
