= Wapikoni Mobile =

Indigenous audio-visual non-profit organization

Wapikoni
- Founded: 2004; 22 years ago
- Type: Non-profit organization
- Headquarters: Montreal, Quebec, Canada
- Key people: Manon Barbeau, Council of the Atikamekw Nation and the First Nations of Quebec and Labrador Youth Network
- Staff: 12 (60 contract workers)
- Website: www.wapikoni.ca

Wapikoni Mobile is a Canadian non-profit organization based in Montreal, Quebec that hosts educational workshops and film screenings to raise awareness and educate the wider public about Indigenous cultures, issues and rights.

Each year, an average of 300 youth participate in the workshops creating 50 short films and 30 musical recordings.

Wapikoni Mobile has visited over 29 Indigenous nations in Canada and abroad (including Chile, Peru, Bolivia, Panama, and Finland). The program has produced over 1000 short films and 600 music recordings giving a voice to over 4,000 Indigenous youth.

== History ==
In the early 2000s, filmmaker Manon Barbeau shot a feature-length film with 15 Atikamekw youths from the Wemotaci community in Quebec. Wapikoni is named after one of Barbeau's collaborators on the project, a young woman named Wapikoni Awashish, a young Cree woman who died in a car crash at the age of 20. At the time of her death, Awashish was filming a feature-length film titled "La fin du mapris".

In 2004 during the Montreal First Peoples Festival, filmmaker Barbeau along with the Council of the Atikamekw Nation and the Youth Council First Nations of Quebec and Labrador (currently known as First Nations of Quebec and Labrador Youth Network) founded Wapikoni Mobile and launched the first of the mobile studios that the organization operates today. The National Film Board of Canada was also a founding partner.

A notable participant from the project's inaugural year was Samian, an Algonquin rapper from Pikogan in Abitibi-Témiscamingue, who is now a Wapikoni spokesperson and organizes fundraising concerts for the organization. Other Wapikoni participants have gone on to work at Telefilm Canada as well as the CBC.

In 2011, lost nearly half a million dollars in operating grants from Service Canada. Thanks to a grant from Health Canada's suicide prevention strategy, the organization was able to visit Algonquin territory in October 2011. In 2012, Wapikoni Mobile received a three-year $520,000 grant from the McConnell Foundation.

As of 2012, Wapikoni has two permanent studios: one each in the Kitcisakik and the Wemotaci First Nations communities. In 2014, it hosted an international symposium with the goal of creating RICAA (Réseau International de Création Audiovisuelle Autochtone), a network of Aboriginal production companies.

In 2017, Wapikoni Mobile became an official UNESCO partner to provide consultation services on the expression of Indigenous youth and the issues affecting them.

Wapikoni Mobile employs a dozen people in its offices and 60 contractual field workers (a third are Aboriginal).

== Programming ==
The organization provides mentorship and training in audiovisual creation to Indigenous youth mostly in Canada in the hopes of creating jobs and educational opportunities, countering high rates of suicide, drop-out and addiction.

Participants accompanied by two filmmaker-mentor, an Indigenous assistant filmmaker-mentor, a local youth outreach worker, and a coordinator from the community. Youth are trained on technical aspects of film making with professional equipment. The month-long workshops focus on documentary film making and musical recording, offering participants training in writing and directing, along with other behind the scenes work such as filming, sound recording, and editing.

Each mobile studio is an RV equipped with an editing station, a small sound studio, a projection and screening area, desktops with Final Cut Pro, and HD cameras and microphones to film with. The organization has been credited with providing Aboriginal youth an outlet for expressing themselves, as well as the tools and skills to do so.

The films are screened in their communities of origin and often go on to be screened more widely to non-Aboriginal audiences.

== Awards and recognition ==
- Participants have won 152 awards and honours from national and international Human Rights organizations and film festivals.
- 28th Grand Prize of the Montreal Council of Arts, film category
- 2011, Rights and Freedoms Prize, the Honorable Mention Award at Plural +
- 2014, Intercultural Innovation Award from the United Nations Alliance of Civilizations (UNAOC)
- 2017, finalist for the 2017 Global Pluralism Award.

In 2024, the organization's 20th anniversary was marked with a special retrospective program of some of its short films at the 2024 Festival du nouveau cinéma. A further selection of short films was screened at the 2025 Festival du nouveau cinéma.
