= Continental, a Film Without Guns =

- French: Continental, un film sans fusil
- Directed by: Stéphane Lafleur
- Written by: Stéphane Lafleur
- Produced by: Luc Déry; Kim McCraw
- Starring: Réal Bossé; Marie-Ginette Guay; Fanny Mallette; Pauline Martin; Gilbert Sicotte
- Cinematography: Sara Mishara
- Edited by: Sophie Leblond
- Music by: Stéphane Lafleur; Hugo Lavoie
- Distributed by: Christal Films
- Release date: 31 August 2007 (Venice Film Festival)
- Running time: 103 minutes
- Country: Canada
- Language: French

Continental, a Film Without Guns (French: Continental, un film sans fusil) is a 2007 Canadian comedy-drama film directed and written by Stéphane Lafleur.

== Plot ==
The lives of four people intertwine after the disappearance of a man who wanders into the forest. A Man wakes up on a bus. Everybody is gone. Night has fallen. He gets off the bus and finds himself at the edge of a forest. Sounds are coming from deep within the woods. The Man enters the forest and disappears into the night.

== Recognition ==
- Won: 2007 Toronto International Film Festival: Best Canadian First Feature Film
- Won: 2007 Whistler Film Festival: Borsos Competition Best Canadian Film
- Official Selection: Venice Film Festival
  - Jutra Awards:
    - Best Motion Picture of the Year (Meilleur Film) - Luc Déry
      Kim McCraw
    - Best Achievement in Directing (Meilleure Réalisation) - Stéphane Lafleur
    - Best Performance by an Actor in a Supporting Role (Meilleur Acteur de Soutien) - Réal Bossé
    - Best Screenplay (Meilleur Scénario) - Stéphane Lafleur
- Nominee:
  - Genie Award for Best Motion Picture - Luc Déry
    Kim McCraw
  - Genie Award for Best Achievement in Art Direction/Production Design - André-Line Beauparlant
  - Genie Award for Best Performance by an Actor in a Supporting Role - Gilbert Sicotte
  - Genie Award for Best Performance by an Actress in a Supporting Role - Marie-Ginette Guay
  - Genie Award for Best Performance by an Actress in a Supporting Role - Fanny Mallette
  - Jutra Awards:
    - Best Achievement in Cinematography (Meilleure Direction de la Photographie) - Sara Mishara
    - Best Achievement in Art Direction (Meilleure Direction Artistique) - André-Line Beauparlant
    - Best Achievement in Editing (Meilleure Montage) - Sophie Leblond
    - Best Achievement in Sound (Meilleur Son) - Pierre Bertrand, Sylvain Bellemare and Bernard Gariépy Strobl
