= List of Canadian films of 2004 =

This is a list of Canadian films which were released in 2004:

| Title | Director | Cast | Genre | Notes |
|---|---|---|---|---|
| Acapulco Gold | André Forcier | Michel Maillot | Comedy-drama, mockumentary | |
| Battle of the Brave (Nouvelle-France) | Jean Beaudin | Noémie Godin-Vigneau, David La Haye, Gérard Depardieu, Irene Jacob, Jason Isaacs, Tim Roth | Historical drama | Genie Award – Art Direction/Production Design; Canada-U.K.-France co-production |
| Being Julia | István Szabó | Annette Bening, Jeremy Irons, Shaun Evans, Juliet Stevenson, Maury Chaykin, Michael Gambon | Drama based on a story by W. Somerset Maugham | Canada-U.K.-Hungary co-production made with U.S. financing |
| Better Off in Bed | Reginald Harkema | The New Pornographers | Documentary | |
| The Big Thing | Carl Laudan | Robin Wilcock, Andrew Simms, Mathieu Courtemanche | Short, black comedy | |
| Bittersweet Memories (Ma vie en cinemascope) | Denise Filiatrault | Pascale Bussières, Denis Bernard | Biodrama on Alice Robitaille | Genie Award – Actress (Bussières); Prix Jutra – Actress (Bussières), Sound, Art Direction, Costumes, Makeup |
| Blood | Jerry Ciccoritti | Emily Hampshire, Jacob Tierney | Drama | Based on the play by Tom Walmsley |
| The Blue Butterfly | Léa Pool | William Hurt, Pascale Bussières, Marc Donato, Raoul Trujillo | Family drama | Canada-U.K.-France co-production made with U.S. financing |
| A Brand New You | Kathryn Palmateer; Shawn Whitney | Manuel Rodriguez-Saenz, Freya Ravensbergen, Clinton Lee Pontes | Comedy | |
| The Bridge (Le Pont) | Guy Édoin | Patrick Hivon, Catherine Bonneau | Short | |
| Capacité 11 personnes | Gaëlle d'Ynglemare | | Short drama | |
| Care Bears: Journey to Joke-a-lot | Mike Fallows | voices Julie Lemieux, Adrian Truss, Susan Roman, Katie Griffin | Animated feature | Direct to DVD |
| Childstar | Don McKellar | Don McKellar, Jennifer Jason Leigh, Mark Rendell, Gil Bellows, Dave Foley | Comedy | Genie Award – Supporting Actress (Leigh) |
| Clean | Olivier Assayas | Maggie Cheung, Nick Nolte, Don McKellar, Martha Henry | Drama | Cannes Film Festival – Best Actress (Chung), Technical Grand Prize; Canada-U.K.-France co-production |
| CQ2 (Seek You Too) | Carole Laure | Clara Furey, Jean-Marc Barr | Family drama | Canada-France co-production |
| Cube Zero | Ernie Barbarash | Zachary Bennett, Stephanie Moore, Michael Riley, Martin Roach | Sci-fi, Horror | Prequel to original Cube |
| Decoys | Matthew Hastings | Nicole Eggert, Kim Poirier | Horror | |
| Dawn of the Dead | Zack Snyder | Sarah Polley, Ving Rhames, Jake Weber, Ty Burrell, Kevin Zegers | Horror | This Canada-France-Japan co-production made with U.S. financing is a remake of the 1978 original film. |
| Desastre | Jay Field | Kendall Negro | Short comedy | |
| Elvis Gratton III: La Vengence d'Elvis Gratton | Pierre Falardeau | Julien Poulin | Satire | |
| Everyone | Bill Marchant | Matt Fentiman, Mark Hildreth, Brendan Fletcher | Comedy-drama | |
| Expiration | Gavin Heffernan | Janet Lane, Gavin Heffernan | Drama, Fantasy | |
| The Final Cut | Omar Naim | Robin Williams, Mira Sorvino, James Caviezel | Sci-fi, Thriller | Canada-German co-production made with U.S. financing |
| The Five of Us (Elles étaient cinq) | Ghyslaine Côté | Peter Miller, Noémie Yelle | Drama | |
| From Cherry English | Jeff Barnaby | Nathaniel Arcand | Short drama | |
| Geraldine's Fortune | John N. Smith | Jane Curtin, Mary Walsh, Sheila McCarthy, Matt Frewer, Peter MacNeill, Monique Mercure | Comedy, Drama | Based on a play by Michel Tremblay |
| Ginger Snaps 2: Unleashed | Brett Sullivan | Katharine Isabelle, Emily Perkins, Brendan Fletcher, Tatiana Maslany | Horror | |
| Ginger Snaps Back: The Beginning | Grant Harvey | Emily Perkins, Katharine Isabelle | Horror | |
| Godsend | Nick Hamm | Greg Kinnear, Rebecca Romijn, Robert De Niro | Horror, Drama | made with U.S. financing |
| Going the Distance | Mark Griffiths | Christopher Jacot, Joanne Kelly, Shawn Roberts, Ryan Belleville, August Schellenberg | Teen, Comedy | Made with U.S. financing |
| Graveyard Alive: A Zombie Nurse in Love | Elza Kephart | Anne Day-Jones, Samantha Slan | Parody, Horror | Slamdance 2004 Award; went direct to DVD |
| Ham & Cheese | Warren P. Sonoda | Mike Beaver, Jason Jones, Samantha Bee, Dave Foley | Comedy | |
| Hank Williams First Nation | Aaron James Sorensen | Colin Van Loon, Gordon Tootoosis, Stacy Da Silva | Drama | |
| Happy Camper (Camping sauvage) | Guy A. Lepage, André Ducharme, Sylvain Roy | Guy A. Lepage, Sylvie Moreau, Normand D'Amour | Crime comedy | |
| Head in the Clouds | John Duigan | Charlize Theron, Penélope Cruz, Stuart Townsend, Thomas Kretschmann, Steven Berkoff | Wartime drama | Canada-France co-production |
| Hollywood North | Peter O'Brian | Alan Bates, Matthew Modine, Deborah Kara Unger, Jennifer Tilly, John Neville, Fabrizio Filippo | Satire | |
| I, Claudia | Chris Abraham | Kristen Thomson | play Kristen Thomson | |
| I, Curmudgeon | Alan Zweig | Alan Zweig, Harvey Pekar, Fran Lebowitz | Documentary | Silver Hugo, Chicago International Film Festival |
| The Incomparable Miss C. (L'Incomparable Mademoiselle C.) | Richard Ciupka | Marie-Chantal Perron, Pierre Lebeau | Children's comedy | |
| Intern Academy | Dave Thomas | Dave Thomas, Carly Pope, Dan Aykroyd, Saul Rubinek, Dave Foley, Maury Chaykin | Comedy | |
| It's All Gone Pete Tong | Michael Dowse | Paul Kaye, Mike Wilmot, Beatriz Batarda, Kate Magowan | Mockumentary | Canadian Comedy Award Best Film/Actor; Canada-U.K. co-production |
| Jack Paradise: Montreal by Night (Jack Paradise : Les nuits de Montréal) | Gilles Noël | Roy Dupuis, Dawn Tyler Watson, Geneviève Rioux, Gregory Hlady | Musical drama | |
| Jiminy Glick in Lalawood | Vadim Jean | Martin Short, Jan Hooks, Linda Cardellini, Janeane Garofalo | Comedy | Made with U.S. financing |
| John and Michael | Shira Avni | | Animated short produced with the National Film Board | Short documentary award, DOXA |
| The Last Tunnel (Le Dernier Tunnel) | Érik Canuel | Michel Côté, Jean Lapointe, Christopher Heyerdahl | Crime drama | Genie Award – Supporting Actor (Lapointe), Overall Sound; Prix Jutra – Supporting Actor (Lapointe) |
| Looking for Alexander (Mémoires affectives) | Francis Leclerc | Roy Dupuis, Rosa Zacharie, Maka Kotto | Drama | Genie Awards – Director, Screenplay, Actor (Dupuis); Prix Jutra – Film, Director, Actor (Dupuis), Editing |
| Love and Magnets (Les Aimants) | Yves Pelletier | Isabelle Blais, Sylvie Moreau, David Savard | Romantic comedy | Prix Jutra – Screenplay, Supporting Actress (Moreau), Musical Score |
| The Love Crimes of Gillian Guess | Bruce McDonald | Joely Collins, Ben Bass, Hugh Dillon | Drama | |
| Mabel's Saga | JoDee Samuelson | | Animated short | |
| Machine Gun Molly (Monica la mitraille) | Pierre Houle | Céline Bonnier, Roy Dupuis, Patrick Huard, Frank Schorpion, Rémy Girard | Crime drama | Genie Award - Adapted Screenplay |
| Mammouth | Stefan Miljevic | Julie Le Breton, Robin Aubert, Louis Champagne | Short drama | Jutra Award winner for Best Short Film |
| Man. Feel. Pain. | Dylan Akio Smith | Brad Dryborough, Ryan Robbins, Peter New, Arabella Bushnell | Short drama | |
| The Man with No Shadow (L'Homme sans ombre) | Georges Schwizgebel | | Animated short | |
| Manners of Dying | Jeremy Peter Allen | Roy Dupuis, Serge Houde | Drama | |
| Milo 55160 | David Ostry | Patrick McKenna, Graham Kartna | Drama | |
| Mr. Mergler's Gift | Beverly Shaffer | Daniel Mergler, Xin Ben Yu | Documentary | |
| My Only Love (Je n'aime que toi) | Claude Fournier | | | |
| Nocturnal Doubling | Daniel Cockburn | | Experimental short | |
| Nothing | Vincenzo Natali | David Hewlett, Andrew Miller, Gordon Pinsent, Marie-Josée Croze | Surreal drama | |
| On the Verge of a Fever (Le Goût des jeunes filles) | John L'Ecuyer | Lansana Kourouma, Kouma Ball, Maka Kotto | Drama | |
| Phil the Alien | Rob Stefaniuk | Rob Stefaniuk, Nicole de Boer, Graham Greene, Bruce Hunter, Boyd Banks and the voice of Joe Flaherty | Comedy | |
| Public Domain | Kris Lefcoe | Nicole de Boer, Nadia Litz, Mike Beaver, Don McKellar, Lindy Booth, Jason Jones | Black comedy | |
| The Raspberry Reich | Bruce LaBruce | | Comedy | Canada-German co-production |
| Resident Evil: Apocalypse | Alexander Witt | Milla Jovovich, Sienna Guillory, Jared Harris, Sandrine Holt | Action/horror | Genie Award - Sound editing; Golden Reel Award; Canada-U.K.-German-France co-production made with U.S. financing |
| Ryan | Chris Landreth | Ryan Larkin | National Film Board animated short | Academy Award for Animated Short Film; Genie Award - Animated short |
| The Sadness of Johnson Joe Jangles | Jeffrey St. Jules | Zachary Bennett, Gregory White, Soo Garay | Short drama | |
| Saint Ralph | Michael McGowan | Adam Butcher, Campbell Scott, Gordon Pinsent, Shauna MacDonald, Jennifer Tilly | Drama | |
| Scared Sacred | Velcrow Ripper | | Documentary | Genie Award - Documentary |
| Seven Times Lucky | Gary Yates | Kevin Pollak, Liane Balaban, Jonas Chernick | Drama | |
| Shake Hands With the Devil | Peter Raymont | Roméo Dallaire | Documentary | Sundance – Audience Award World Cinema: Documentary; also a 2007 dramatic feature |
| Show Me | Cassandra Nicolaou | Michelle Nolden, Kett Turton, Gabriel Hogan, Katharine Isabelle | Drama | |
| Shrek 2 | Andrew Adamson, Kelly Asbury, Conrad Vernon | Mike Myers, Eddie Murphy, Cameron Diaz, Julie Andrews, Antonio Banderas, John Cleese, Rupert Everett, Jennifer Saunders | Computer-animated fantasy comedy | |
| A Silent Love | Federico Hidalgo | Vanessa Bauche, Susanna Salazar | Dramedy | Premiered at the Sundance Film Festival |
| Sissy Boy Slap Party | Guy Maddin | Louis Negin, Noam Gonick, John K. Samson | Experimental short | New recreation of Maddin's lost 1994 film of the same name. |
| So the Moon Rises (La lune viendra d'elle-même) | Marie-Jan Seile | France Castel, Isabelle Leblanc | Drama | |
| Stryker | Noam Gonick | Kyle Henry, Deena Fontaine, Ryan Rajendra Black | Drama | |
| Stupid Coalescing Becomers | Daniel Cockburn | Daniel Cockburn | Experimental short | Made over a weekend |
| Sugar | John Palmer | Andre Noble, Brendan Fehr | Drama | Based on short stories Bruce LaBruce |
| The Take | Avi Lewis | | Documentary | Canada-Argentina co-production |
| Through My Thick Glasses | Pjotr Sapegin | | Animated short | Canadian-Norwegian coproduction |
| Tideline (Littoral) | Wajdi Mouawad | Steve Laplante | play by Wajdi Mouawad | Canada-France co-production |
| Touch of Pink | Ian Iqbal Rashid | Jimi Mistry, Kyle MacLachlan | Romantic comedy | Canada-U.K. co-production |
| The Triplets of Belleville (Les Triplettes de Belleville) | Sylvain Chomet | | Animated feature co-produced with the National Film Board | Academy Award nominee; Canada-France-Belgium co-production |
| TV Dinner...Burp! | Vanessa-Tatjana Beerli | Emmanuel Bilodeau, Anne-Marie Cadieux | Short comedy | |
| Two Eastern Hair Lines | Steven Woloshen | | Animated short | |
| Two Worlds Colliding | Tasha Hubbard | | National Film Board short | Winner of Canada Award |
| Welcome to Kentucky | Craig Welch | | Animated short | |
| What Remains of Us (Ce qu'il reste de nous) | Hugo Latulippe & François Prévost | Kalsang Dolma, Dalai Lama | National Film Board documentary | |
| White Skin (La Peau blanche) | Daniel Roby | Julie Le Breton | Horror | Claude Jutra Award; TIFF – Best Canadian First Feature |
| Wilby Wonderful | Daniel MacIvor | Sandra Oh, Paul Gross, Callum Keith Rennie, James Allodi | Drama | |
| Zeyda and the Hitman | Melanie Mayron | Danny Aiello, Judd Hirsch, Gil Bellows, Mercedes Ruehl | Comedy | Made for TV |

== See also ==
- 2004 in Canada
- 2004 in Canadian television
