= 7th Jutra Awards =

2005 Canadian film awards ceremony

The 7th Jutra Awards were held on February 20, 2005 to honour films made with the participation of the Quebec film industry in 2004.

Bittersweet Memories (Ma vie en cinémascope) lead the ceremony with nine nominations and five awards, including Best Actress for Pascale Bussières. This was Bussières' second acting award, having previously won Best Supporting Actress for Set Me Free (Emporte-moi).

Looking for Alexander (Mémoires affectives) was nominated for five awards and won four, including Best Film, Best Director and Best Actor for Roy Dupuis. Love and Magnets (Les aimants) won three awards, including Best Screenplay and Best Supporting Actress for Sylvie Moreau, who tied for the award with Brigitte Lafleur for The Five of Us (Elles étaient cinq).

The Last Tunnel (Le dernier tunnel) set the record for the film with the most nominations without receiving one for Best Film, with eight nominations. This record would be broken at the 11th Jutra Awards by Babine.

Céline Bonnier became the first actress to be nominated for both Best Actress and Best Supporting Actress during the same ceremony, and the second performer to do so after Luc Picard who first achieved this feat three years prior. Unlike Picard, she didn't win either award.

The award for Most Successful Film Outside Quebec went to The Barbarian Invasions (Les invasions barbares) who had won the same award the year before.

== Winners and nominees ==
Best Film	Best Director
Looking for Alexander (Mémoires affectives) — Barbara Shrier; Bittersweet Memories (Ma vie en cinémascope) — Denise Robert, Daniel Louis; The Five of Us (Elles étaient cinq) — Maxime Rémillard, Richard Lalonde; Love and Magnets (Les aimants) — Nicole Robert, Gabriel Pelletier	Francis Leclerc, Looking for Alexander (Mémoires affectives); Denise Filiatrault, Bittersweet Memories (Ma vie en cinémascope); Pierre Houle, Machine Gun Molly (Monica la mitraille); Yves Pelletier, Love and Magnets (Les aimants)
Best Actor	Best Actress
Roy Dupuis, Looking for Alexander (Mémoires affectives); Michel Côté, The Last Tunnel (Le dernier tunnel); Guy Jodoin, Dans une galaxie près de chez vous; David La Haye, Battle of the Brave (Nouvelle-France)	Pascale Bussières, Bittersweet Memories (Ma vie en cinémascope); Isabelle Blais, Love and Magnets (Les aimants); Céline Bonnier, Machine Gun Molly (Monica la mitraille); Jacinthe Laguë, The Five of Us (Elles étaient cinq)
Best Supporting Actor	Best Supporting Actress
Jean Lapointe, The Last Tunnel (Le dernier Tunnel); Emmanuel Bilodeau, Love and Magnets (Les aimants); Stéphane Crête, Dans une galaxie près de chez vous; Serge Postigo, Bittersweet Memories (Ma vie en cinémascope)	Sylvie Moreau, Love and Magnets (Les aimants); Brigitte Lafleur, The Five of Us (Elles étaient cinq); Céline Bonnier, The Last Tunnel (Le dernier tunnel); Marie-France Marcotte, The Last Tunnel (Le dernier tunnel)
Best Screenplay	Best Documentary
Yves Pelletier, Love and Magnets (Les aimants); Marcel Beaulieu and Francis Leclerc, Looking for Alexander (Mémoires affectives); Pierre-Yves Bernard and Claude Legault, Dans une galaxie près de chez vous; Chantal Cadieux and Ghyslaine Côté, The Five of Us (Elles étaient cinq)	François Prévost and Hugo Latulippe, What Remains of Us (Ce qu'il reste de nous); André-Line Beauparlant, Le Petit Jésus; Carole Laganière, East End Kids (Vues de l'est); Tahani Rached, Soraida: A Woman of Palestine (Soraida, une femme de Palestine)
Best Live Short	Best Animated Short
Papa — Émile Proulx-Cloutier; The Bridge (Le pont) — Guy Édoin; J'te laisserai pas tomber — Patrick Goyette; Quelques éclats d'aube — Simon Lavoie	Nibbles — Christopher Hinton; The Accordion (Accordéon) — Michèle Cournoyer; Imprints (Empreintes) — Jacques Drouin; Welcome to Kentucky — Craig Welch
Best Art Direction	Best Cinematography
Normand Sarazin, Bittersweet Memories (Ma vie en cinémascope); Jean Babin, Dans une galaxie près de chez vous; Michel Proulx, Machine Gun Molly (Monica la mitraille); Jean-Baptiste Tard, Battle of the Brave (Nouvelle-France)	Pierre Mignot, The Blue Butterfly (Le papillon bleu); Serge Desrosiers, Dans une galaxie près de chez vous; Alexis Durand-Brault, The Five of Us (Elles étaient cinq); Louis de Ernsted, Battle of the Brave (Nouvelle-France)
Best Costume Design	Best Editing
François Barbeau, Battle of the Brave (Nouvelle-France); Mario Davignon, Head in the Clouds; Michèle Hamel, Machine Gun Molly (Monica la mitraille); Denis Sperdouklis, Bittersweet Memories (Ma vie en cinémascope)	Glenn Berman, Looking for Alexander (Mémoires affectives); Jean-François Bergeron, The Last Tunnel (Le dernier tunnel); Richard Comeau, The Five of Us (Elles étaient cinq); Hélène Girard, How to Conquer America in One Night (Comment conquérir l'Amérique en une nuit)
Best Hair	Best Makeup
Michelle Côté, Bittersweet Memories (Ma vie en cinémascope); Réjean Goderre, Head in the Clouds; Linda Gordon, Happy Camper (Camping sauvage); Denis Parent, Machine Gun Molly (Monica la mitraille)	Marie-Angèle Breitner, Bittersweet Memories (Ma vie en cinémascope); Claudette Beaudoin-Casavant, The Last Tunnel (Le dernier tunnel); Kathryn Casault, Battle of the Brave (Nouvelle-France); Odile Ferlatte, The Five of Us (Elles étaient cinq)
Best Original Music	Best Sound
Carl Bastien and Dumas, Love and Magnets (Les aimants); Michel Corriveau, The Last Tunnel (Le dernier tunnel); Michel Cusson, Dans une galaxie près de chez vous; James Gelfand, Jack Paradise: Montreal by Night (Jack Paradise, Les nuits de Montréal)	Donald Cohen, Marie-Claude Gagné and Michel Descombes, Bittersweet Memories (Ma vie en cinémascope); Dominique Chartrand, Christian Rivest, Gavin Fernandes and Pierre Paquet, The Last Tunnel (Le dernier tunnel); Claude La Haye, Colin Miller and Adrian Rhodes, Battle of the Brave (Nouvelle-France); Serge Bouvier, Simon Brien, Martin Pinsonnault and Clovis Gouaillier, White Skin (La peau blanche)
Special Awards
Jutra Hommage: Michel Brault; Most Successful Film Outside Quebec: The Barbarian Invasions (Les invasions barbares); Billet d'or: Happy Camper (Camping sauvage)

== Multiple wins and nominations ==
=== Films with multiple nominations ===
Nominations	Film
9	Bittersweet Memories (Ma vie en cinémascope)
8	The Last Tunnel (Le dernier tunnel)
7	The Five of Us (Elles étaient cinq)
7	Love and Magnets (Les aimants)
6	Battle of the Brave (Nouvelle-France)
6	Dans une galaxie près de chez vous
5	Looking for Alexander (Mémoires affectives)
5	Machine Gun Molly (Monica la mitraille)
2	Head in the Clouds

=== Films with multiple wins ===
Wins	Film
5	Bittersweet Memories (Ma vie en cinémascope)
4	Looking for Alexander (Mémoires affectives)
3	Love and Magnets (Les aimants)
