= Canadian Screen Award for Best Editing =

Canadian TV And Cinema Award

- Country: Canada
- Presented by: Academy of Canadian Cinema & Television
- First award: 1966
- Currently held by: Simone Smith for Mile End Kicks (2025)
- Website: academy.ca/awards

The Canadian Screen Award for Best Achievement in Editing is awarded by the Academy of Canadian Cinema and Television to the best Canadian film editor in a feature film. The award was presented for the first time in 1966 as part of the Canadian Film Awards, and was transitioned to the new Genie Awards in 1980. Since 2012 it has been presented as part of the Canadian Screen Awards.

Beginning with the 3rd Canadian Screen Awards, a separate category was introduced for Best Editing in a Documentary.

== 1960s ==
Year	Winner	Film	Ref
1966; 18th Canadian Film Awards
1966; 18th Canadian Film Awards	Don Owen	High Steel	
1967; 19th Canadian Film Awards
1967; 19th Canadian Film Awards	Jacques Kasma	Ghosts of a River (Trois hommes au mille carré)	
1968; 20th Canadian Film Awards
1968; 20th Canadian Film Awards	George Appleby	Isabel	
1969; 21st Canadian Film Awards
1969; 21st Canadian Film Awards	No award presented		

== 1970s ==
Year	Nominee	Film	Ref
1970; 22nd Canadian Film Awards
1970; 22nd Canadian Film Awards	Christopher Cordeaux	Prologue	
1971; 23rd Canadian Film Awards
1971; 23rd Canadian Film Awards	Douglas Robertson	Fortune and Men's Eyes	
1972; 24th Canadian Film Awards
1972; 24th Canadian Film Awards	Danielle Gagné	Dream Life (La Vie rêvée)	
1973; 25th Canadian Film Awards
1973; 25th Canadian Film Awards	Kirk Jones	Paperback Hero	
1974
1974	No award presented		
1975; 26th Canadian Film Awards
1975; 26th Canadian Film Awards	Stan Cole	Black Christmas	
1976; 27th Canadian Film Awards
1976; 27th Canadian Film Awards	Donald Shebib	Second Wind	
1977; 28th Canadian Film Awards
1977; 28th Canadian Film Awards	Jean Beaudin, Hélène Girard	J.A. Martin Photographer (J.A. Martin, photographe)	
1977; 28th Canadian Film Awards	John Kramer	One Man	
1978; 29th Canadian Film Awards
1978; 29th Canadian Film Awards	George Appleby	The Silent Partner	
1978; 29th Canadian Film Awards	William Gray	Blood and Guts	
1978; 29th Canadian Film Awards	George Kaczender	In Praise of Older Women	
1978; 29th Canadian Film Awards	Ron Wisman	Three Card Monte	

== 1980s ==
Year	Nominee	Film	Ref
1980; 1st Genie Awards
1980; 1st Genie Awards	Stan Cole	Murder By Decree	
1980; 1st Genie Awards	George Appleby	Wild Horse Hank	
1980; 1st Genie Awards	Jean Beaudin	Cordélia	
1980; 1st Genie Awards	Debra Karen	Meatballs	
1980; 1st Genie Awards	Debra Karen	Yesterday	
1980; 1st Genie Awards	Marcel Pothier	Heartbreak	
1980; 1st Genie Awards	Ron Wisman	Fish Hawk	
1981; 2nd Genie Awards
1981; 2nd Genie Awards	André Corriveau	Good Riddance (Les Bons débarras)	
1981; 2nd Genie Awards	Pierre Jalbert	Final Assignment	
1981; 2nd Genie Awards	Tony Lower	The Hounds of Notre Dame	
1981; 2nd Genie Awards	Michael McLaverty	The Kidnapping of the President	
1981; 2nd Genie Awards	Brian Ravok	Prom Night	
1982; 3rd Genie Awards
1982; 3rd Genie Awards	Ron Wisman	Ticket to Heaven	
1982; 3rd Genie Awards	Ralph Brunjes	Funeral Home	
1982; 3rd Genie Awards	Gordon McLellan	Alligator Shoes	
1982; 3rd Genie Awards	Gary Oppenheimer	Head On	
1982; 3rd Genie Awards	Arla Saare	Silence of the North	
1982; 3rd Genie Awards	Ronald Sanders	Scanners	
1983; 4th Genie Awards
1983; 4th Genie Awards	Yves Langlois	Quest for Fire	
1983; 4th Genie Awards	Frank Irvine	The Grey Fox	
1983; 4th Genie Awards	Susan Martin	Threshold	
1983; 4th Genie Awards	Ron Wisman	Harry Tracy	
1984; 5th Genie Awards
1984; 5th Genie Awards	Ron Wisman	The Terry Fox Story	
1984; 5th Genie Awards	Stan Cole	A Christmas Story	
1984; 5th Genie Awards	André Corriveau	The Tin Flute (Bonheur d'occasion)	
1984; 5th Genie Awards	Doris Dyck, Jack Darcus, Bill Roxborough, Ingrid Rosen	Deserters	
1984; 5th Genie Awards	Tony Lower	The Wars	
1984; 5th Genie Awards	Ronald Sanders	Videodrome	
1985; 6th Genie Awards
1985; 6th Genie Awards	André Corriveau	The Dog Who Stopped the War (La Guerre des tuques)	
1985; 6th Genie Awards	Monique Fortier	The Crime of Ovide Plouffe (Le Crime d'Ovide Plouffe)	
1985; 6th Genie Awards	Frank Irvine	My Kind of Town	
1986; 7th Genie Awards
1986; 7th Genie Awards	Haida Paul	My American Cousin	
1986; 7th Genie Awards	Richard Martin	Samuel Lount	
1986; 7th Genie Awards	Sally Paterson	Overnight	
1986; 7th Genie Awards	David Wilson	90 Days	
1986; 7th Genie Awards	Ron Wisman	Joshua Then and Now	
1987; 8th Genie Awards
1987; 8th Genie Awards	Monique Fortier	The Decline of the American Empire (Le Déclin de l'empire américain)	
1987; 8th Genie Awards	André Corriveau	Intimate Power (Pouvoir intime)	
1987; 8th Genie Awards	Michael Jones	The Adventure of Faustus Bidgood	
1988; 9th Genie Awards
1988; 9th Genie Awards	Michel Arcand	Night Zoo (Un Zoo la nuit)	
1988; 9th Genie Awards	Bruce MacDonald, Atom Egoyan	Family Viewing	
1989; 10th Genie Awards
1989; 10th Genie Awards	Ronald Sanders	Dead Ringers	
1989; 10th Genie Awards	Michel Arcand	Straight for the Heart (À corps perdu)	
1989; 10th Genie Awards	Susan Martin, Allan Lee	A Winter Tan	

== 1990s ==
Year	Nominee	Film	Ref
1990; 11th Genie Awards
1990; 11th Genie Awards	Isabelle Dedieu	Jesus of Montreal (Jésus de Montréal)	
1990; 11th Genie Awards	Frank Irvine	The First Season	
1990; 11th Genie Awards	Christopher Tate	Bye Bye Blues	
1991; 12th Genie Awards
1991; 12th Genie Awards	David Wilson	The Company of Strangers	
1991; 12th Genie Awards	Michel Arcand	The Party (Le Party)	
1991; 12th Genie Awards	André Corriveau	Vincent and Me (Vincent et moi)	
1991; 12th Genie Awards	Allan Lee	Chaindance	
1991; 12th Genie Awards	Ronald Sanders	Perfectly Normal	
1991; 12th Genie Awards	Tim Wellburn	Black Robe	
1992; 13th Genie Awards
1992; 13th Genie Awards	Michel Arcand	Léolo	
1992; 13th Genie Awards	André Corriveau	Being at Home with Claude	
1992; 13th Genie Awards	Bruce Lange	North of Pittsburgh	
1992; 13th Genie Awards	Lara Mazur	Bordertown Café	
1992; 13th Genie Awards	Michael Pacek	Highway 61	
1993; 14th Genie Awards
1993; 14th Genie Awards	Gaétan Huot	Thirty-Two Short Films About Glenn Gould	
1993; 14th Genie Awards	Roushell Goldstein	Paris, France	
1993; 14th Genie Awards	Debra Rurak	Harmony Cats	
1993; 14th Genie Awards	Susan Shipton	I Love a Man in Uniform	
1993; 14th Genie Awards	Susan Shipton	The Lotus Eaters	
1994; 15th Genie Awards
1994; 15th Genie Awards	Alison Grace	Double Happiness	
1994; 15th Genie Awards	Michel Arcand	Desire in Motion (Mouvements du désir)	
1994; 15th Genie Awards	Jacques Gagné	My Friend Max (Mon amie Max)	
1994; 15th Genie Awards	Denis Papillon	Louis 19, King of the Airwaves (Louis 19, le roi des ondes)	
1994; 15th Genie Awards	Susan Shipton	Exotica	
1995; 16th Genie Awards
1995; 16th Genie Awards	Michael Pacek	Dance Me Outside	
1995; 16th Genie Awards	Michel Arcand	Eldorado	
1995; 16th Genie Awards	Emmanuelle Castro	The Confessional (Le Confessionnal)	
1995; 16th Genie Awards	Susan Maggi	Rude	
1995; 16th Genie Awards	Jean-Marc Vallée	Black List (Liste noire)	
1996; 17th Genie Awards
1996; 17th Genie Awards	Ronald Sanders	Crash	
1996; 17th Genie Awards	André Corriveau	Lilies (Les feluettes)	
1996; 17th Genie Awards	Reginald Harkema	Hard Core Logo	
1996; 17th Genie Awards	Susan Maggi	The Boys Club	
1996; 17th Genie Awards	Susan Shipton	Long Day's Journey into Night	
1997; 18th Genie Awards
1997; 18th Genie Awards	Susan Shipton	The Sweet Hereafter	
1997; 18th Genie Awards	Richard Comeau	The Countess of Baton Rouge (La Comtesse de Baton Rouge)	
1997; 18th Genie Awards	Pia Di Ciaula	Intimate Relations	
1997; 18th Genie Awards	Gaétan Huot	Karmina	
1997; 18th Genie Awards	Susan Shanks	The Hanging Garden	
1998; 19th Genie Awards
1998; 19th Genie Awards	Jeff Warren	Such a Long Journey	
1998; 19th Genie Awards	Pia Di Ciaula	Regeneration	
1998; 19th Genie Awards	Reginald Harkema	Last Night	
1998; 19th Genie Awards	Gaëtan Huot	The Red Violin	
1998; 19th Genie Awards	John Sanders	Cube	
1999; 20th Genie Awards
1999; 20th Genie Awards	Ronald Sanders	eXistenZ	
1999; 20th Genie Awards	Alain Baril	Matroni and Me (Matroni et moi)	
1999; 20th Genie Awards	André Corriveau	Winter Stories (Histoires d'hiver)	
1999; 20th Genie Awards	Yves Langois, Jean-François Bergeron	Alegría	
1999; 20th Genie Awards	Susan Shanks, Michael Weir	Beefcake	

== 2000s ==
Year	Nominee	Film	Ref
2000; 21st Genie Awards
2000; 21st Genie Awards	Susan Shipton	Possible Worlds	
2000; 21st Genie Awards	Michel Arcand	The Art of War	
2000; 21st Genie Awards	Richard Comeau	Maelström	
2000; 21st Genie Awards	Hélène Girard	The Orphan Muses (Les Muses orphelines)	
2000; 21st Genie Awards	Susan Maggi	New Waterford Girl	
2001; 22nd Genie Awards
2001; 22nd Genie Awards	Zacharias Kunuk, Marie-Christine Sarda, Norman Cohn	Atanarjuat: The Fast Runner	
2001; 22nd Genie Awards	Jon Gregory	Deeply	
2001; 22nd Genie Awards	Brett C. Sullivan	Ginger Snaps	
2001; 22nd Genie Awards	Wiebke von Carolsfeld	Eisenstein	
2001; 22nd Genie Awards	Ross Weber	Last Wedding	
2002; 23rd Genie Awards
2002; 23rd Genie Awards	Lara Mazur	Suddenly Naked	
2002; 23rd Genie Awards	George Browne, Lorraine Dufour	The Negro (Le nèg')	
2002; 23rd Genie Awards	Cynthia Ott, Michael Dowse	FUBAR	
2002; 23rd Genie Awards	Roberto Silvi, Bill MacDonald	Between Strangers	
2002; 23rd Genie Awards	Yvann Thibaudeau, Marlon Paul	Québec-Montréal	
2003; 24th Genie Awards
2003; 24th Genie Awards	David Wharnsby	The Saddest Music in the World	
2003; 24th Genie Awards	Isabelle Dedieu	The Barbarian Invasions (Les Invasions barbares)	
2003; 24th Genie Awards	Dominique Fortin	Seducing Doctor Lewis (La Grande séduction)	
2003; 24th Genie Awards	Alison Grace	The Snow Walker	
2003; 24th Genie Awards	Michael Weir	The Wild Dogs	
2004; 25th Genie Awards
2004; 25th Genie Awards	Dominique Fortin	Head in the Clouds	
2004; 25th Genie Awards	Jean-François Bergeron	The Last Tunnel (Le Dernier tunnel)	
2004; 25th Genie Awards	Richard Comeau	The Five of Us (Elles étaient cinq)	
2004; 25th Genie Awards	Reginald Harkema	Childstar	
2004; 25th Genie Awards	Yvann Thibaudeau	Bittersweet Memories (Ma vie en cinémascope)	
2005; 26th Genie Awards
2005; 26th Genie Awards	Paul Jutras	C.R.A.Z.Y.	
2005; 26th Genie Awards	Jeremy Peter Allen	Manners of Dying	
2005; 26th Genie Awards	Stuart Gazzard	It's All Gone Pete Tong	
2005; 26th Genie Awards	Colin Monie	Water	
2005; 26th Genie Awards	Susan Shipton	Where the Truth Lies	
2006; 27th Genie Awards
2006; 27th Genie Awards	Michel Arcand	The Rocket	
2006; 27th Genie Awards	Jean-François Bergeron	Bon Cop, Bad Cop	
2006; 27th Genie Awards	Frédérique Broos	Congorama	
2006; 27th Genie Awards	Michel Grou	Cheech	
2006; 27th Genie Awards	Lesley Walker	Tideland	
2007; 28th Genie Awards
2007; 28th Genie Awards	Ronald Sanders	Eastern Promises	
2007; 28th Genie Awards	Jean-François Bergeron	The 3 L'il Pigs (Les 3 p'tits cochons)	
2007; 28th Genie Awards	Susan Maggi	Poor Boy's Game	
2007; 28th Genie Awards	Jeremiah Munce, Gareth C. Scales	The Tracey Fragments	
2007; 28th Genie Awards	David Wharnsby	Away from Her	
2008; 29th Genie Awards
2008; 29th Genie Awards	Richard Comeau	The Necessities of Life (Ce qu'il faut pour vivre)	
2008; 29th Genie Awards	Frédérique Broos	It's Not Me, I Swear! (C'est pas moi, je le jure!)	
2008; 29th Genie Awards	Dominique Fortin	Mommy Is at the Hairdresser's (Maman est chez le coiffeur)	
2008; 29th Genie Awards	Dominique Fortin, Carina Baccanale	Le Banquet	
2008; 29th Genie Awards	Yvann Thibaudeau	Borderline	
2009; 30th Genie Awards
2009; 30th Genie Awards	Richard Comeau	Polytechnique	
2009; 30th Genie Awards	Alain Baril	5150 Elm's Way (5150, rue des Ormes)	
2009; 30th Genie Awards	Michel Grou	The Master Key (Grande Ourse: La Clé des possibles)	
2009; 30th Genie Awards	Jim Munro	Fifty Dead Men Walking	
2009; 30th Genie Awards	François Normandin, Jim Donovan	3 Seasons (3 saisons)	

== 2010s ==
Year	Nominee	Film	Ref
2010; 31st Genie Awards
2010; 31st Genie Awards	Monique Dartonne	Incendies	
2010; 31st Genie Awards	Michele Conroy	Splice	
2010; 31st Genie Awards	Matthew Hannam	Trigger	
2010; 31st Genie Awards	Valérie Héroux	10½	
2010; 31st Genie Awards	Yvann Thibaudeau	Piché: The Landing of a Man (Piché: entre ciel et terre)	
2011; 32nd Genie Awards
2011; 32nd Genie Awards	Stéphane Lafleur	Monsieur Lazhar	
2011; 32nd Genie Awards	Jean-François Bergeron	The Year Dolly Parton Was My Mom	
2011; 32nd Genie Awards	Michael Czarnecki	In Darkness	
2011; 32nd Genie Awards	Patrick Demers	Suspicions (Jaloux)	
2011; 32nd Genie Awards	Ronald Sanders	A Dangerous Method	
2012; 1st Canadian Screen Awards
2012; 1st Canadian Screen Awards	Richard Comeau	War Witch (Rebelle)	
2012; 1st Canadian Screen Awards	Roderick Deogrades	Still Mine	
2012; 1st Canadian Screen Awards	Valérie Héroux	L'Affaire Dumont	
2012; 1st Canadian Screen Awards	Sophie Leblond	Inch'Allah	
2012; 1st Canadian Screen Awards	Kimberlee McTaggart	Blackbird	
2013; 2nd Canadian Screen Awards
2013; 2nd Canadian Screen Awards	Matthew Hannam	Enemy	
2013; 2nd Canadian Screen Awards	Carina Baccanale	Amsterdam	
2013; 2nd Canadian Screen Awards	Richard Comeau	Gabrielle	
2013; 2nd Canadian Screen Awards	Evan Morgan, Matt Johnson	The Dirties	
2013; 2nd Canadian Screen Awards	Jorge Weisz	Empire of Dirt	
2014; 3rd Canadian Screen Awards
2014; 3rd Canadian Screen Awards	Xavier Dolan	Mommy	
2014; 3rd Canadian Screen Awards	Greg Ng	Afflicted	
2014; 3rd Canadian Screen Awards	Ron Sanders	Maps to the Stars	
2014; 3rd Canadian Screen Awards	Albert Shin	In Her Place	
2014; 3rd Canadian Screen Awards	Arthur Tarnowski	Henri Henri	
2015; 4th Canadian Screen Awards
2015; 4th Canadian Screen Awards	Nathan Nugent	Room	
2015; 4th Canadian Screen Awards	Renée Beaulieu	Adrien (Le Garagiste)	
2015; 4th Canadian Screen Awards	Mathieu Bouchard-Malo	Our Loved Ones (Les Êtres chers)	
2015; 4th Canadian Screen Awards	James Vandewater	Sleeping Giant	
2015; 4th Canadian Screen Awards	David Wharnsby	Hyena Road	
2016; 5th Canadian Screen Awards
2016; 5th Canadian Screen Awards	Richard Comeau	Two Lovers and a Bear	
2016; 5th Canadian Screen Awards	Michael Long	Old Stone	
2016; 5th Canadian Screen Awards	Ashley McKenzie	Werewolf	
2016; 5th Canadian Screen Awards	Claude Palardy	Bad Seeds (Les mauvaises herbes)	
2016; 5th Canadian Screen Awards	Duff Smith	Weirdos	
2017; 6th Canadian Screen Awards
2017; 6th Canadian Screen Awards	Stephen O'Connell	Maudie	
2017; 6th Canadian Screen Awards	Kiarash Anvari	Ava	
2017; 6th Canadian Screen Awards	Darragh Byrne	The Breadwinner	
2017; 6th Canadian Screen Awards	Louis-Philippe Rathé	It's the Heart That Dies Last (C'est le cœur qui meurt en dernier)	
2017; 6th Canadian Screen Awards	Simone Smith	Never Steady, Never Still	
2018; 7th Canadian Screen Awards
2018; 7th Canadian Screen Awards	Simone Smith	Firecrackers	
2018; 7th Canadian Screen Awards	Richard Comeau	Stockholm	
2018; 7th Canadian Screen Awards	Elric Robichon	For Those Who Don't Read Me (À tous ceux qui ne me lisent pas)	
2018; 7th Canadian Screen Awards	Jules Saulnier	Sashinka	
2018; 7th Canadian Screen Awards	Arthur Tarnowski, Nicolas Chaudeurge	The Hummingbird Project	
2019; 8th Canadian Screen Awards
2019; 8th Canadian Screen Awards	Geoffrey Boulangé, Sophie Deraspe	Antigone	
2019; 8th Canadian Screen Awards	Lara Johnston	Mouthpiece	
2019; 8th Canadian Screen Awards	Cam McLauchlin	Disappearance at Clifton Hill	
2019; 8th Canadian Screen Awards	Simone Smith	Goalie	
2019; 8th Canadian Screen Awards	Wiebke von Carolsfeld	An Audience of Chairs	

== 2020s ==
Year	Nominee	Film	Ref
2020; 9th Canadian Screen Awards
2020; 9th Canadian Screen Awards	Jeff Barnaby	Blood Quantum	
2020; 9th Canadian Screen Awards	Christine Armstrong	Sugar Daddy	
2020; 9th Canadian Screen Awards	Jane MacRae	The Cuban	
2020; 9th Canadian Screen Awards	Ronald Sanders	Falling	
2020; 9th Canadian Screen Awards	Arthur Tarnowski	The Decline (Jusqu'au déclin)	
2021; 10th Canadian Screen Awards
2021; 10th Canadian Screen Awards	Michelle Szemberg, Orlee Buium	All My Puny Sorrows	
2021; 10th Canadian Screen Awards	Aube Foglia	Night of the Kings (La nuit des rois)	
2021; 10th Canadian Screen Awards	Dev Singh	Cinema of Sleep	
2021; 10th Canadian Screen Awards	Arthur Tarnowski	Drunken Birds (Les Oiseaux ivres)	
2021; 10th Canadian Screen Awards	Yvann Thibaudeau	Goodbye Happiness (Au revoir le bonheur)	
2022; 11th Canadian Screen Awards
2022; 11th Canadian Screen Awards	Simone Smith	I Like Movies	
2022; 11th Canadian Screen Awards	Christopher Donaldson	Crimes of the Future	
2022; 11th Canadian Screen Awards	Sophie Leblond	Viking	
2022; 11th Canadian Screen Awards	Faran Moradi	Tehranto	
2022; 11th Canadian Screen Awards	Anthony Shim	Riceboy Sleeps	
2023; 12th Canadian Screen Awards
2023; 12th Canadian Screen Awards	Curt Lobb	BlackBerry	
2023; 12th Canadian Screen Awards	Pauline Gaillard	The Nature of Love (Simple comme Sylvain)	
2023; 12th Canadian Screen Awards	Stéphane Lafleur	Humanist Vampire Seeking Consenting Suicidal Person (Vampire humaniste cherche suicidaire consentant)	
2023; 12th Canadian Screen Awards	Isabelle Malenfant	The Dishwasher (Le Plongeur)	
2023; 12th Canadian Screen Awards	James Vandewater	Infinity Pool	
2024; 13th Canadian Screen Awards
2024; 13th Canadian Screen Awards	Xi Feng	Universal Language (Une langue universelle)	
2024; 13th Canadian Screen Awards	Anna Catley	Paying for It	
2024; 13th Canadian Screen Awards	Anna Catley	We Forgot to Break Up	
2024; 13th Canadian Screen Awards	Christopher Donaldson	The Shrouds	
2024; 13th Canadian Screen Awards	Curt Lobb	I Used to Be Funny	
2024; 13th Canadian Screen Awards	Jorge Weisz	Sharp Corner	
2025; 14th Canadian Screen Awards
2025; 14th Canadian Screen Awards	Simone Smith	Mile End Kicks	
2025; 14th Canadian Screen Awards	Matthieu Bouchard, Chloé Robichaud	Two Women (Deux femmes en or)	
2025; 14th Canadian Screen Awards	Jane MacRae	Nika and Madison	
2025; 14th Canadian Screen Awards	Myriam Magassouba	Follies (Folichonneries)	
2025; 14th Canadian Screen Awards	Kurt Walker	Blue Heron	

== See also ==
- Prix Iris for Best Editing
