= 25th Genie Awards =

2005 Canadian film awards ceremony

- Date: March 21, 2005
- Site: Metro Toronto Convention Centre
- Hosted by: Andrea Martin

Highlights
- Best Picture: The Triplets of Belleville

The 25th Genie Awards were held on March 21, 2005 to honour the best Canadian films released in 2004. The awards took place at the Metro Toronto Convention Centre in Toronto.

Andrea Martin was the host.

== Nominees and winners ==
The Genie Award winner in each category is shown in bold text.

Motion Picture	Direction
**The Triplets of Belleville (Les Triplettes de Belleville) — Paul Cadieux**; Being Julia — Robert Lantos; Bittersweet Memories (Ma vie en cinémascope) — Denise Robert and Daniel Louis; Looking for Alexander (Mémoires affectives) — Barbara Shrier; Love, Sex and Eating the Bones — Jennifer Holness	**Francis Leclerc, Looking for Alexander (Mémoires affectives)**; Denise Filiatrault, Bittersweet Memories (Ma vie en cinémascope); Pierre Houle, Machine Gun Molly (Monica la mitraille); Bronwen Hughes, Stander; David "Sudz" Sutherland, Love, Sex and Eating the Bones
Actor in a leading role	Actress in a leading role
**Roy Dupuis, Looking for Alexander (Mémoires affectives)**; Michel Côté, The Last Tunnel (Le Dernier tunnel); Ian McKellen, Émile; David La Haye, Battle of the Brave (Nouvelle-France); Nick Stahl, Twist	**Pascale Bussières, Bittersweet Memories (Ma vie en cinémascope)**; Isabelle Blais, Love and Magnets (Les Aimants); Emily Hampshire, Blood; Jacinthe Laguë, The Five of Us (Elles étaient cinq); Céline Bonnier, Machine Gun Molly (Monica la mitraille)
Actor in a supporting role	Actress in a supporting role
**Jean Lapointe, The Last Tunnel (Le Dernier tunnel)**; Bruce Greenwood, Being Julia; Brendan Fehr, Sugar; Kyle MacLachlan, Touch of Pink; Gary Farmer, Twist	**Jennifer Jason Leigh, Childstar**; Juliette Gosselin, Battle of the Brave (Nouvelle-France); Sylvie Moreau, Love and Magnets (Les Aimants); Elliot Page, (Note: Credited as Ellen Page) Wilby Wonderful; Susana Salazar, A Silent Love
Original Screenplay	Adapted Screenplay
**Francis Leclerc and Marcel Beaulieu, Looking for Alexander (Mémoires affectives)**; Denise Filiatrault, Bittersweet Memories (Ma vie en cinémascope); Federico Hidalgo and Paulina Robles, A Silent Love; Don McKellar and Michael Goldbach, Childstar; David "Sudz" Sutherland, Love, Sex and Eating the Bones	**Luc Dionne and Sylvain Guy, Machine Gun Molly (Monica la mitraille)**; Joël Champetier and Daniel Roby, White Skin (La Peau blanche); Jerry Ciccoritti, Blood; Todd Klinck, Jaie Laplante and John Palmer, Sugar; Jacob Tierney, Twist
Best Live Action Short Drama	Best Animated Short
**Capacité 11 personnes – Gaëlle d'Ynglemare** and **Yves Fortin**; Choke. – David Hyde, Tyler Levine and Carolyn Newman; Desastre – Jay Field; The Dog Walker – James Genn, Andrew Rosen and Geoffrey Turnbull; TV Dinner...Burp! – Vanessa-Tatjana Beerli, Antonello Cozzolino and Annie Normandin	**Ryan – Chris Landreth, Steven Hoban, Marcy Page** and **Mark Smith**; Louise – Anita Lebeau, Michael J. F. Scott and Jennifer Torrance; Mabel's Saga – JoDee Samuelson and Kent Martin; The Man with No Shadow (L'Homme sans ombre) – Georges Schwizgebel and Marcel Jean; Through My Thick Glasses – Pjotr Sapegin, Marcel Jean and David Reiss-Andersen
Art Direction/Production Design	Cinematography
**Jean-Baptiste Tard, Battle of the Brave (Nouvelle-France)**; André-Line Beauparlant, Happy Camper (Camping sauvage); Jean Bécotte, The Last Tunnel (Le Dernier tunnel); Jonathan Lee and Gilles Aird, Head in the Clouds; Michel Proulx, Machine Gun Molly (Monica la mitraille)	**Paul Sarossy, Head in the Clouds**; Bernard Couture, The Last Tunnel (Le Dernier tunnel); Louis de Ernsted, Battle of the Brave (Nouvelle-France); Pierre Mignot, Bittersweet Memories (Ma vie en cinémascope); André Turpin, Childstar
Costume Design	Editing
**Mario Davignon, Head in the Clouds**; François Barbeau, Battle of the Brave (Nouvelle-France); Michèle Hamel, Machine Gun Molly (Monica la mitraille); Sophie Lefebvre, Happy Camper (Camping sauvage); Denis Sperdouklis, Bittersweet Memories (Ma vie en cinémascope)	**Dominique Fortin, Head in the Clouds**; Jean-François Bergeron, The Last Tunnel (Le Dernier tunnel); Richard Comeau, The Five of Us (Elles étaient cinq); Reginald Harkema, Childstar; Yvann Thibaudeau, Bittersweet Memories (Ma vie en cinémascope)
Overall Sound	Sound Editing
**Dominique Chartrand, Gavin Fernandes and Pierre Paquet, The Last Tunnel (Le Dernier tunnel)**; Pierre Blain, Jo Caron, Michel Descombes and Gavin Fernandes, Head in the Clouds; Christian Bouchard, Luc Boudrias, Jo Caron, Clovis Gouaillier and Benoît Leduc, Looking for Alexander (Mémoires affectives); Dean Humphreys, Todd Beckett and David Lee, Resident Evil: Apocalypse; Nicole Thompson, Jeff Carter, Brad Hillman and Miguel Nunes, Émile	**Craig Henighan, Steve Baine, Stephen Barden, Tony Lewis, Jill Purdy and Nathan Robitaille, Resident Evil: Apocalypse**; Marie-Claude Gagné, Guy Francoeur, Guy Pelletier, Claire Pochon and Jean-Philippe Savard, Happy Camper (Camping sauvage); Marcel Pothier, Natalie Fleurant, Guy Francoeur, Antoine Morin and Guy Pelletier, Head in the Clouds; Marcel Pothier, Natalie Fleurant, Guy Francoeur, Carole Gagnon and Antoine Morin, Machine Gun Molly (Monica la mitraille); Christian Rivest, The Last Tunnel (Le Dernier tunnel)
Achievement in Music: Original Score	Achievement in Music: Original Song
**Terry Frewer, Head in the Clouds**; Benoît Charest, The Triplets of Belleville (Les Triplettes de Belleville); Michel Corriveau, The Last Tunnel (Le Dernier tunnel); Pierre Duchesne, Looking for Alexander (Mémoires affectives); Charles Papasoff, So the Moon Rises (La lune viendra d'elle-même)	**Ron Proulx and Jacob Tierney, "Pantaloon in Black" — Twist**; Rebecca Jenkins, "Something's Coming" — Wilby Wonderful; Kyprios, "Ignorance is Beautiful (Help Me)" — Childstar; Luc Plamondon and Patrick Doyle, "Ma Nouvelle France" — Battle of the Brave (Nouvelle-France); Lorraine Richard, Michel Cusson and Pierre Houle, "Le Blues de Monica" — Machine Gun Molly (Monica la mitraille)
Documentary	Special awards
**The Corporation – Mark Achbar, Jennifer Abbott and Bart Simpson**; What Remains of Us (Ce qu'il reste de nous) – François Prevost, Yves Bisaillon and Hugo Latulippe; Mr. Mergler's Gift – Beverly Shaffer and Germaine Wong	Claude Jutra Award: **White Skin (La Peau blanche) – Daniel Roby**; Golden Reel Award: **Resident Evil: Apocalypse**
