= Camping sauvage =

Camping sauvage may refer to:

- Camping sauvage (1998 film), a French short film which was shortlisted for the César Award for Best Short Film in 2000,
- Happy Camper (Camping sauvage), a Canadian comedy film released in 2004,
- Wild Camp (Camping sauvage), a French drama film released in 2005 starring Isild Le Besco.
