= Barrymore (film) =

- Film poster
- Directed by: Érik Canuel
- Written by: Érik Canuel
- Based on: Barrymore by William Luce
- Produced by: Garth Drabinsky
- Starring: Christopher Plummer
- Cinematography: Bernard Couture
- Edited by: Jean-François Bergeron
- Music by: Michel Corriveau
- Distributed by: BY Experience
- Release date: September 10, 2011 (Toronto)
- Running time: 83 minutes
- Country: Canada
- Language: English

Barrymore is a 2011 Canadian drama film directed and screen adaptation by Érik Canuel based on William Luce's 1996 play of the same name. It stars Christopher Plummer reprising his Tony Award-winning role as John Barrymore.

== Plot ==
Actor John Barrymore comes to terms with the ravages of his life of excess and rents an old theatre to rehearse for a backer's audition to raise funds for a revival of his 1920 Broadway hit Richard III.

== Cast ==
- Christopher Plummer as John Barrymore
- John Plumpis as Frank the Prompter

== Production ==
The film was shot at the Elgin and Winter Garden Theatres in Toronto.

== Release and reception ==
The film premiered at the 2011 Toronto Film Festival.

As of October 2021, the film has a 70% approval rating on Rotten Tomatoes, based on 23 reviews with an average rating of 6.6/10. David Hinckley of the New York Daily News wrote, "Plummer commands the stage as easily and firmly as Barrymore must have. He makes us believe that Barrymore would indeed, as he tries to reach deep into his past and revive Richard [III], keep recalling his wives or breaking in to sing a pop song of the day." He added, "It's exasperating, funny and sad on film, just as it was on stage." Andrew Schenker of Slant Magazine awarded the film one and a half stars out of four. David Fear of Time Out awarded the film two stars out of five. Colin Covert of the Star Tribune awarded the film three stars. Lisa Schwarzbaum of Entertainment Weekly graded the film a B.

Betsy Sharkey of the Los Angeles Times gave a negative review, writing, "It was brilliant as a one-man stage show; it was never a good candidate for film."
