= File 13 (film) =

- Film poster
- French: Filière 13
- Directed by: Patrick Huard
- Written by: Claude Lalonde; Pierre Lamothe
- Produced by: Pierre Gendron
- Starring: Claude Legault; Guillaume Lemay-Thivierge; Paul Doucet; Jean-Pierre Bergeron
- Cinematography: Bernard Couture
- Edited by: Jean-François Bergeron
- Music by: Betty Bonifassi; Jean-Phi Goncalves
- Production company: Zoofilms
- Distributed by: Alliance Vivafilm
- Release date: August 4, 2010
- Running time: 112 minutes
- Country: Canada
- Language: French

File 13 (French: Filière 13) is a Canadian crime comedy film, directed by Patrick Huard and released in 2010. The film centres on Thomas (Claude Legault), Benoît (Paul Doucet) and Jean-François (Guillaume Lemay-Thivierge), three bumbling police officers who unexpectedly stumble into an opportunity to try to capture Fecteau (Jean-Pierre Bergeron), a high-ranking figure in the sponsorship scandal who has managed to elude arrest for several years.

The supporting cast includes Élisabeth Locas, Marie Turgeon, Anik Jean, André Sauvé, Sharlene Royer, Laurent Paquin, Carmen Ferlan, Monique Spaziani, Luc Senay, Jean Petitclerc, Annick Léger, Widemir Normil, Daniel Boucher and Emmanuel Auger.

== Production ==
The film was made by the same production team, and featured the same three primary stars, as The 3 L'il Pigs (Les 3 p'tits cochons), but was not a sequel.

It was originally slated to be directed by Louis Choquette, under the title Operation Tablet, with Huard coming in as director after Choquette dropped out due to scheduling conflicts. Choquette had cast Legault as Jean-François and Lemay-Thivierge as Thomas, with Huard choosing to swap their roles as he felt they fit the actors better.

It went into production in Montreal in fall 2009.

== Release ==
The film had been slated to premiere on August 6, 2010, with its premiere advanced to August 4 at the last minute.

Although the film was commercially successful, surpassing the $1 million benchmark for commercial success in the Quebec market within 10 days of its release, it was poorly received by critics, who virtually all compared it directly to The 3 L'il Pigs and asserted that it had failed to capture the same qualities that made the earlier film successful. It has not been publicly stated whether the critical failure of File 13 was a factor in Huard not returning as director of The 3 L'il Pigs 2 in 2016.

== Awards ==
Simon Poudrette, Christian Rivest and Dominique Delguste received a Jutra Award nomination for Best Sound at the 13th Jutra Awards in 2011.
