= François Prévost =

Canadian documentary filmmaker (born 1965)

- Born: November 6, 1965 (age 61); Montmagny
- Occupation: Documentary filmmaker

François Prévost (born November 6, 1965 in Montmagny) is a Canadian documentary filmmaker from Quebec, most noted as co-director with Hugo Latulippe of the 2004 film What Remains of Us (Ce qu'il reste de nous). The film was a Genie Award nominee for Best Feature Length Documentary at the 25th Genie Awards and the winner of the Jutra Award for Best Documentary Film at the 7th Jutra Awards.

Prior to making What Remains of Us, Prévost was a contestant in the 1994-95 edition of La Course destination monde, tying with Ricardo Trogi for the win at the end of the season. Latulippe, his co-director on What Remains of Us, was also a contestant in the same season.

He did not continue a career in filmmaking, instead turning to medical practice. In 2023, he was appointed director of medical affairs and services of the Cree Board of Health and Social Services of James Bay.
