= Paul Doucet =

Canadian actor

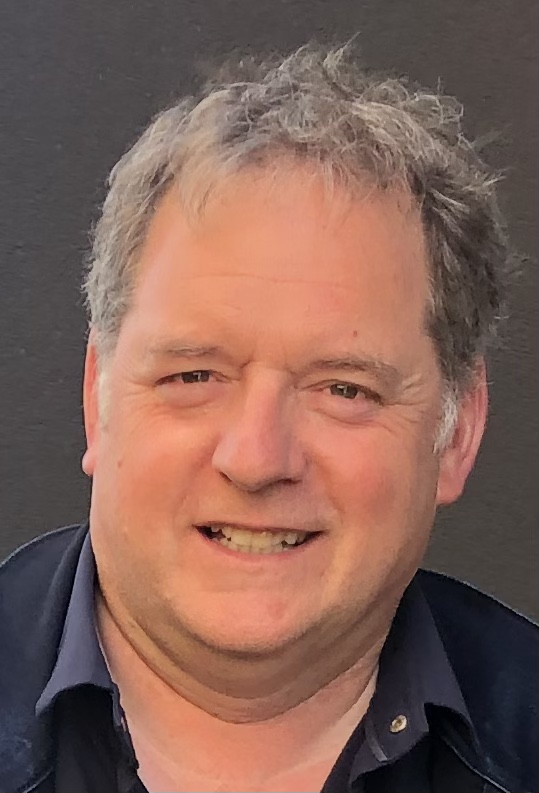
- Paul Doucet photographed in Ste. Thérèse, Québec, Canada outside the Cabaret BMO.
- Born: 1970 (age 55–56); Montreal, Quebec, Canada
- Education: Université du Québec à Montréal
- Children: Camille Felton

Paul Doucet (born 1970) is a Canadian actor known for his portrayal of Jean Duceppe in Jean Duceppe.

== Early life ==
Doucet was born in Montreal, Quebec in 1970. He studied drama at the Université du Québec à Montréal.

== Career ==
His most recent work includes a leading role in The 3 L'il Pigs (Les 3 p'tits cochons) and its sequel The 3 L'il Pigs 2. Other roles include Camil DesRoches in The Rocket (Maurice Richard), Bittersweet Memories (Ma vie en cinémascope), Shattered City: The Halifax Explosion, All Souls, Mr. Meyer in À vos marques... party! 2, Benoît in Filière 13, Jackie Bouvier Kennedy Onassis mini-series as Ed Schlossberg, the prime minister in My Internship in Canada (Guibord s'en va-t-en guerre) and Canada: A People's History as Jean de Brébeuf.

== Personal life ==
Doucet's daughter is child actress Camille Felton.

== Filmography ==
=== Film ===
Year	Title	Role	Notes
1996	Mistaken Identity (Erreur sur la personne)	Paul Lamoureux	
1998	Sublet	Homicide Detective	
2000	Life After Love (La vie après l'amour)	Détective Petit	
2003	Evil Words (Sur le seuil)	Inspecteur Goulet	
2004	Wicker Park	Driver	
2004	Bittersweet Memories (Ma vie en cinémascope)	Roy Maloin	
2005	The Rocket (Maurice Richard)	Camil Desroches	
2007	The 3 L'il Pigs (Les 3 p'tits cochons)	Rémi	
2008	Waitresses Wanted (Serveuses demandées)	Inspecteur junior	
2009	Taking the Plunge 2 (À vos marques... Party! 2)	Joseph Meilleur	
2009	The Trotsky	Male Cop	
2009	Noemi: The Secret (Noémie: Le secret)	François	
2010	File 13 (Filière 13)	Benoît	
2010	Lance et compte	Roger Sivard	
2011	Funkytown	Jonathan Aaronson	
2011	Thrill of the Hills (Frisson des collines)	Vétérinaire	
2011	On the Beat (Sur le rythme)	Denis Lamarre	
2011	Fear of Water (La peur de l'eau)	Bernard Duval	
2012	Le Colis	Eric St-Louis	
2012	Exile (Exil)	Jean-François	
2013	Hot Dog	Philippe Chagnon	
2014	La Garde	Luc Bisaillon	
2015	My Internship in Canada (Guibord s'en va-t-en guerre)	Premier ministre	
2015	Early Winter	David	
2016	The 3 L'il Pigs 2 (Les 3 p'tits cochons 2)	Rémy	
2016	The Squealing Game (La chasse au collet)	Eric Desbiens	
2017	It's the Heart That Dies Last (C'est le coeur qui meurt en dernier)	Henri	
2017	Hochelaga, Land of Souls (Hochelaga, terre des âmes)	Stade Percival-Molson	
2018	La Bolduc	Jean Grimaldi	
2018	The Fall of the American Empire (La Chute de l'empire américain	Dr Pierre-Yves Maranda	
2018	With Love (L'Amour)	J.J. Marchand	
2018	Pauvre Georges!	Benoît Chevrier	
2019	Antigone	Christian	
2019	A Way of Life (Une manière de vivre)		
2020	Our Own (Les Nôtres)	Jean-Marc Ricard	
2020	Old Buddies (Les Vieux Chums)	Jacques	
2022	Norbourg	Georges de Chavigny	
2025	Lovely Day (Mille secrets mille dangers)		

=== Television ===
Year	Title	Role	Notes
1994	4 et demi..	Médecin	Episode: "2 mariages 2 accouchements"
1994	Les grands procès	Denis Léveillé	Episode: "L'Affaire Mesrine"
1996	Two's a Crowd	Policier de la sureté	Episode #2.19
1998	Le retour	Papa à la garderie	Episode #3.3
2000	Canada: A People's History	Jean de Brébeuf	Television film
2000	Willie	Ambulancier	Episode #1.5
2000	Jackie Bouvier Kennedy Onassis	Ed Schlossberg	Television film
2001	All Souls	Paramedic	2 episodes
2001	WW 3	Agent #1	Television film
2001	Fortier	Pierre Ducharme	4 episodes
2002	He Shoots, He Scores	Client saoul	Episode #1.1
2002	Jean Duceppe	Jean Duceppe	6 episodes
2003	Chartrand et Simonne	Florent Audette	3 episodes
2003	The Last Chapter		6 episodes
2003	Shattered City: The Halifax Explosion	Captain Le Medec	2 episodes
2006	October 1970	Jean Marc	8 episodes
2008	René Levesque - Le destin d'un chef	Yves Michaud	4 episodes
2008	The Terrorist Next Door	Burgess	Television film
2008	Ramdam	Dr. Lavoie	Episode: "Pas de panique!"
2009	ZOS: Zone of Separation	Major Simon Desjardin	8 episodes
2009	Belle-Baie	Hubert Côté	Episode: "Exercer son droit"
2010	Trauma	Gille Laporte	Episode: "Désir et aversion"
2010	Musée Eden	Dr. Edmond Boyer	9 episodes
2010	Toute la vérité	Dr. Denis Bellavance	Episode: "Épisode 20"
2010–2012	Mauvais Karma	Christophe Tremblay	23 episodes
2011	Mirador	Louis-François Bleau	2 episodes
2012	Sunshine Sketches of a Little Town	Alphonse	Television film
2012	Lance et compte: La déchirure	Maître Roger Savard	4 episodes
2012–2017	Unité 9	Georges Ste-Marie	105 episodes
2014	Mensonges	Kevin Malek	3 episodes
2016–2021	Les Pays d'en haut	Arthur Buies	51 episodes
2017	Vu du pont	Alfieri	Television film
2017–2018	Victor Lessard	Maurice Tanguay	14 episodes
2019	Conséquences	Paul Roy	6 episodes
2020	Edgar	Francis Franklin	Episode: "Episode 4"
2021–2022	District 31	Denis Corbin	33 episodes
2022	Le temps des framboises	Denis Conley	2 episodes
