= Bernard Couture =

Canadian cinematographer

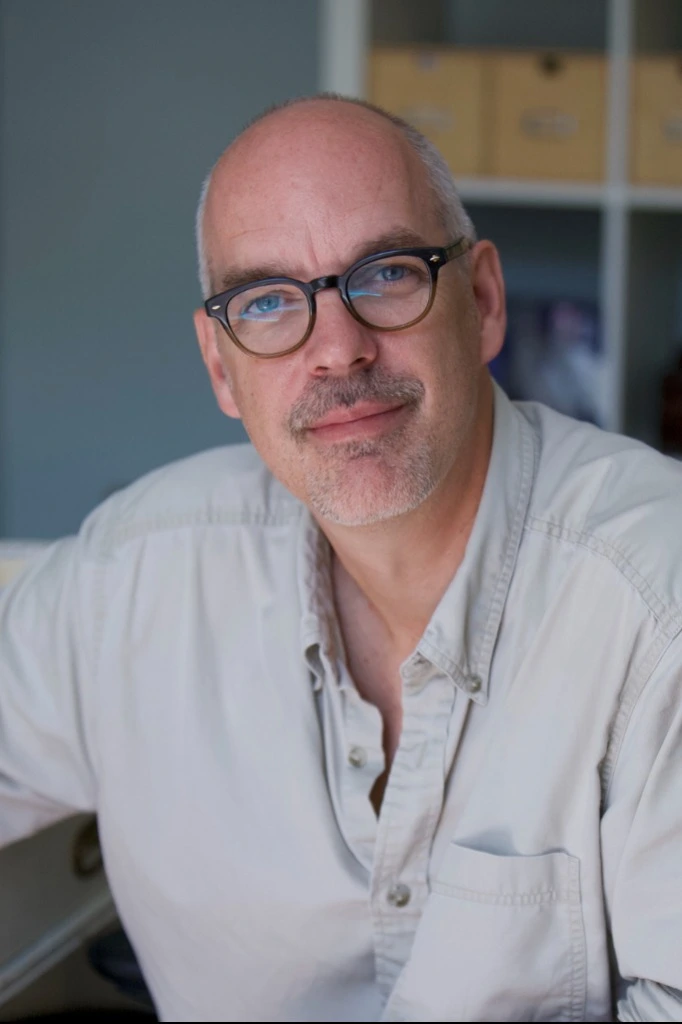
- Couture in 2016
- Born: Trois-Rivieres, Quebec, Canada
- Citizenship: Canada
- Title: President of LES PRODUCTIONS BERNARD COUTURE INC.
- Spouses: Lisa Arnsby; Dorothée Desormeau (divorced)
- Partners: Ginette Pouliot (separated)
- Children: 2
- Parents: Charles Couture; Paula Ferlatte
- Relatives: Pierre Couture (brother); Robert Couture (brother)

Bernard Couture is a Canadian cinematographer from Quebec, most noted as a multiple Genie Award and Prix Iris nominee for his work in Canadian film and television.

== Filmography ==
=== Film ===
- La forêt et le bûcheron - 1996
- Stiletto - 1999
- Red Nose (Nez rouge) - 2003
- The Last Tunnel (Le Dernier Tunnel) - 2004
- The Outlander (Le Survenant) - 2005
- Duo - 2006
- The 3 L'il Pigs (Les 3 p'tits cochons) - 2007
- Affinity - 2008
- Picture This - 2008
- Cadavres - 2009
- Noemi: The Secret (Noémie: Le secret) - 2009
- 10½ - 2010
- 7 Days (Les sept jours du talion) - 2010
- File 13 (Filière 13) - 2010
- A Sense of Humour (Le sens de l'humour) - 2011
- Barrymore - 2011
- L'Affaire Dumont - 2012
- Omertà - 2012
- Sur les traces de la fusion: L'acte 2 - 2012
- Sur les traces de la fusion: L'acte 3 - 2012
- The Pee-Wee 3D: The Winter That Changed My Life (Les Pee-Wee 3d: L'hiver qui a changé ma vie) - 2012
- Lac Mystère - 2013
- Real Lies - 2014
- 9 - 2016
- The 3 L'il Pigs 2 (Les 3 p'tits cochons 2) - 2016

=== Television ===
- Archaeology - 1991–94, six episodes
- The New Detectives - 1996, one episode
- Les aventures de la courte échelle - 1996–97, three episodes
- Dinosaurs Inside & Out - 1997, one episode
- Sweetwater - 1999
- The Hunger - 1999–2000, seven episodes
- Largo Winch - 2001–03, 33 episodes
- Seriously Weird - 2002–04, 18 episodes
- The Last Casino - 2004
- Au nom de la loi - 2005
- Taxi 0-22 - 2007–08, ten episodes
- CAT 8 - 2013
- The Lottery - 2014, nine episodes
- The Transporter - 2014, two episodes
- Proof - 2015, ten episodes
- Mad Dogs - 2015–16, ten episodes
- A Series of Unfortunate Events - 2017–19, 17 episodes
- Altered Carbon - 2020, four episodes
- Helstrom - 2020, seven episodes
- Riverdale - 2021, seven episodes
- The Recruit - 2022, four episodes
- Reacher - 2022, four episodes

== Awards ==
Award	Year	Category	Work	Result	Ref(s)
Genie Awards	2005	Best Cinematography	The Last Tunnel (Le Dernier Tunnel)	Nominated	
Genie Awards	2006	Best Cinematography	The Outlander (Le Survenant)	Nominated	
Genie Awards	2011	Best Cinematography	10½	Nominated	
Jutra/Iris Awards	2008	Best Cinematography	The 3 L'il Pigs (Les 3 p'tits cochons)	Nominated	
Jutra/Iris Awards	2010	Best Cinematography	Cadavres	Nominated	
Jutra/Iris Awards	2011	Best Cinematography	7 Days (Les sept jours du talion)	Nominated	
Jutra/Iris Awards	2012	Best Cinematography	A Sense of Humour (Le sens de l'humour)	Nominated	
