= Jean-Baptiste Tard =

Canadian production designer

Jean-Baptiste Tard is a Canadian production designer, art director and set decorator.

== Recognition ==
Award	Year	Category	Work	Result	Ref(s)
Genie Awards	1988	Best Art Direction or Production Design	Night Zoo (Un zoo la nuit)	Won	
Genie Awards	2004	Best Art Direction or Production Design	Battle of the Brave (Nouvelle-France)	Won	
Prix Jutra	2002	Best Art Direction	February 15, 1839 (15 février 1839)	Won	
Prix Jutra	2005	Best Art Direction	Battle of the Brave (Nouvelle-France)	Nominated	
Directors Guild of Canada	2005	DGC Craft Award for Outstanding Achievement in Production Design	Battle of the Brave (Nouvelle-France)	Won	
