= The Outlander (film) =

2005 Canadian drama film by Eric Canuel

- French: Le Survenant
- Directed by: Érik Canuel
- Written by: Diane Cailhier
- Based on: Le Survenant by Germaine Guèvremont
- Produced by: Jacques Bonin; Claude Veilhet
- Starring: Jean-Nicolas Verreault; Catherine Trudeau; Pierrette Robitaille; Germain Houde
- Cinematography: Bernard Couture
- Music by: Michel Corriveau
- Release date: 2005
- Running time: 138 minutes
- Country: Canada
- Language: French

The Outlander (French: Le Survenant) is a 2005 Canadian drama film from Quebec, directed by Érik Canuel. An adaptation of Germaine Guèvremont's novel Le Survenant, the film stars Jean-Nicolas Verreault as the title character, a mysterious stranger whose arrival in the small town of Chénal-du-Moine significantly shakes up the community.

== Awards ==
The film received five Genie Award nominations at the 26th Genie Awards:

- Best Adapted Screenplay: Diane Cailhier
- Best Cinematography: Bernard Couture
- Best Costume Design: Francesca Chamberland
- Best Sound Editing: Alice Wright, Valéry Dufort-Boucher, Alexis Farand, Jacques Plante and Christian Rivest
- Best Original Song: Sylvain Cossette, Michel Corriveau and Robert Marchand, "Comme une plume au vent"

It did not win any of the awards.
