= The Year Dolly Parton Was My Mom =

- Directed by: Tara Johns
- Screenplay by: Tara Johns
- Produced by: Barbara Shrier
- Starring: Macha Grenon; Gil Bellows; Julia Sarah Stone
- Cinematography: Claudine Sauvé
- Edited by: Jean-François Bergeron
- Music by: Luc Sicard
- Production companies: Palomar; Buffalo Gal Pictures
- Distributed by: Mongrel Media
- Release date: March 4, 2011 (Canada)
- Running time: 95 minutes
- Country: Canada
- Language: English

The Year Dolly Parton Was My Mom is a 2011 Canadian coming-of-age film written and directed by Tara Johns and starring Macha Grenon, Gil Bellows and Julia Sarah Stone. Dolly Parton provides a voice cameo.

== Plot ==
Elizabeth lives in Winnipeg, Manitoba in 1976. She is nearly 12, which Marion, her mother, points out "makes you still 11". Elizabeth and her friend Annabelle are looking forward to their bodies maturing, including the possibility that they might get "big boobs" like Dolly Parton.

Her father, Phil, answers her questions about the family's blood types for a school project. When the project is reviewed in her science class, it reveals that her blood type means that she is not her parents' natural child. She is angry and hurt, and dreams of the possibility of Dolly being her real mother.

Annabelle's mother, Stella, who is active in the woman's movement, admires Dolly as a strong independent businesswoman, adding to Elizabeth's fantasy.

Elizabeth tries to ride her bike to a Dolly concert in Minneapolis, but is stopped hours later at the Emerson border. Marion drives to get her, and the two form a stronger connection over the next two days as Marion takes her to Minneapolis to meet Dolly.

== Reception ==
On review aggregator website Rotten Tomatoes, the film holds a 40% approval rating, based on 5 reviews with an average rating of 5.30/10.

Bruce DeMara of Toronto Star said that "The Year My Mom Was Dolly Parton relies on a good but not great script, well-drawn characters and performances and a pleasant, fuzzy sense of a simpler time".

Liam Lacey of The Globe and Mail wrote: "An ingratiating but overly contrived Canadian coming-of-age tale".

== Awards ==
Year	Award	Category	Recipient(s)	Result	Ref.
2012	Genie Awards	Best Editing	Jean-François Bergeron	Nominated	
2012	Young Artist Award	Best Young Actress in an International Feature Film	Julia Sarah Stone	Won	

=== Streaming ===
In December 2019 the film was released online on the Canada Media Fund’s Encore + YouTube channel.
