= Night Zoo =

1987 Canadian film by Jean-Claude Lauzon

- Film poster
- French: Un Zoo la nuit
- Directed by: Jean-Claude Lauzon
- Written by: Jean-Claude Lauzon
- Produced by: Roger Frappier; Pierre Gendron
- Starring: Gilles Maheu; Lynne Adams; Roger Lebel
- Cinematography: Guy Dufaux
- Edited by: Michel Arcand
- Music by: Jean Corriveau
- Distributed by: FilmDallas (US theatrical)
- Release date: May 1987 (Cannes)
- Running time: 115 minutes
- Country: Canada
- Language: French
- Box office: 1.3 million CAD

Night Zoo (French: Un Zoo la nuit) is a 1987 Canadian film. It is directed and written by Jean-Claude Lauzon. It made its debut at the 1987 Cannes Film Festival. The film was selected as the Canadian entry for the Best Foreign Language Film at the 60th Academy Awards, but was not accepted as a nominee.

It was also the most successful film in the history of the Academy of Canadian Cinema and Television's film awards program up to that point, winning a record 13 Genie Awards in every single category where it was nominated. The film garnered 14 nominations overall; the film's only nomination that failed to translate into a win was Gilles Maheu's nod for Best Actor, as he lost to the film's other Best Actor nominee, Roger Lebel.

== Plot ==
Marcel (Gilles Maheu) is released from prison after completing a two year sentence for narcotics crime, hoping to reconcile with his dying father, Albert (Roger Lebel), who seems to believe his son has been away on a vacation. His former girlfriend Julie (Lynne Adams) is now working in a sex club peep show. When he returns home, he is soon visited by a pair of dishonest police detectives who demand $200,000 in cash that they believe he still possesses from his earlier activity. One of the detectives, George (Lorne Brass) is a homosexual steeped in sadism, who frequently uses violence to attempt to break him. Amidst the threats he navigates, Marcel and Albert repair their relationship, culminating in an after hours break-in at a local zoo.

== Reception ==
=== Box office ===
The film grossed $1 million in Quebec within three months of its release.

=== Awards ===
The film won the most Genie Awards in history, with thirteen awards. Gilles Maheu and Roger Lebel were both nominated for best actor. Lebel won the 1987 Prix Guy-L'Écuyer for Un Zoo la nuit.

In 1987, the film won the Grand Prix for Best Film at Film Fest Gent.

=== Accolades ===
Its record 14 Genie Award nominations were tied by the film Brother at the 11th Canadian Screen Awards in 2023, although that film fell one award short of matching Night Zoo's 13 wins. Its records in both nominations and wins were surpassed at the 12th Canadian Screen Awards in 2024 by BlackBerry, which took 14 awards from 17 overall nominations.

Award	Date of ceremony	Category	Recipient(s)	Result	Ref.
Genie Awards	22 March 1988	Best Picture	Roger Frappier, Pierre Gendron	Won	
Genie Awards	22 March 1988	Best Director	Jean-Claude Lauzon	Won	
Genie Awards	22 March 1988	Best Screenplay	Jean-Claude Lauzon	Won	
Genie Awards	22 March 1988	Best Actor	Roger Lebel	Won	
Genie Awards	22 March 1988	Best Actor	Gilles Maheu	Nominated	
Genie Awards	22 March 1988	Best Supporting Actor	Germain Houde	Won	
Genie Awards	22 March 1988	Best Art Direction or Production Design	Jean-Baptiste Tard	Won	
Genie Awards	22 March 1988	Best Cinematography	Guy Dufaux	Won	
Genie Awards	22 March 1988	Best Costume Design	Andrée Morin	Won	
Genie Awards	22 March 1988	Best Editing	Michel Arcand	Won	
Genie Awards	22 March 1988	Best Overall Sound	Adrian Croll; Hans Peter Strobl; Yvon Benoît	Won	
Genie Awards	22 March 1988	Best Sound Editing	Viateur Paiement; Marcel Pothier; Diane Boucher	Won	
Genie Awards	22 March 1988	Best Music Score	Jean Corriveau	Won	
Genie Awards	22 March 1988	Best Original Song	Jean-Pierre Bonin; Daniel De Shaimes; Jean Corriveau; Robert Stanley	Won	

== Availability ==
The film was released on videocassette and laserdisc in the United States in 1988 by New World and in Canada that same year by Cinema Plus Video. In 1991, an EP-Mode tape of the film was released by Starmaker Video. After Lauzon was killed in the northern Quebec plane crash in 1997, CBC Television, Télé-Québec and Showcase aired Night Zoo and Léolo in August. The film was released on blu ray and DVD in France as of September 2025. It was digitized and restored in May 2013 by Éléphant and is available for online rental on the iTunes Store.

== See also ==
- List of submissions to the 60th Academy Awards for Best Foreign Language Film
- List of Canadian submissions for the Academy Award for Best Foreign Language Film

== Works cited ==
- Melnyk, George (2004). One Hundred Years of Canadian Cinema. University of Toronto Press. ISBN 080203568X.
