= Without Her (2006 film) =

- French: Sans elle
- Directed by: Jean Beaudin
- Written by: Joanne Arseneau
- Produced by: Pierre Gendron; Christian Larouche
- Starring: Karine Vanasse; Marie-Thérèse Fortin; Maxim Gaudette
- Cinematography: Pierre Mignot
- Edited by: Jean-François Bergeron
- Music by: Jean Robitaille
- Production company: Christal Films
- Release date: September 22, 2006
- Running time: 102 minutes
- Country: Canada
- Language: French

Without Her (French: Sans elle) is a Canadian thriller film, directed by Jean Beaudin and released in 2006. The film stars Karine Vanasse as Camille, a woman returning home to Quebec for the first time since leaving for Italy after the disappearance of her mother.

The film's cast also includes Marie-Thérèse Fortin, Maxim Gaudette, Linda Sorgini, Isabel Richer, Patrick Goyette, Emmanuel Schwartz and Johanne-Marie Tremblay.

Composer Jean Robitaille won the Genie Award for Best Original Score at the 27th Genie Awards for his work on the film.
