= The 3 L'il Pigs =

2007 film by Patrick Huard

- Film poster
- French: Les 3 p'tits cochons
- Directed by: Patrick Huard
- Written by: Claude Lalonde; Pierre Lamothe
- Produced by: Pierre Gendron; Christian Larouche
- Starring: Claude Legault; Guillaume Lemay-Thivierge; Paul Doucet
- Cinematography: Bernard Couture
- Edited by: Jean-François Bergeron
- Music by: Stéphane Dufour
- Distributed by: Christal Films
- Release date: August 10, 2007
- Running time: 124 minutes
- Country: Canada
- Language: French

The 3 L'il Pigs (French: Les 3 p'tits cochons) is a 2007 Canadian French-language comedy film. The directorial debut of comedian and actor Patrick Huard, it was the top-grossing Canadian film of 2007, winning both the Golden Reel Award at the 28th Genie Awards and the Billet d'or at the Jutra Awards.

== Plot ==
Two brothers (Legault, Lemay-Thivierge) discuss the positive and negative aspects of adultery as their mother lies beside them in a coma, while their brother Rémi (Doucet) attempts to discourage them. Their conversations become more explicit as time passes.

A scene in the film reveals that Rémi is bisexual and in the closet, a storyline which is explored in more depth in the sequel.

== Related films ==
In 2010, Huard directed File 13 (Filière 13), which reunited the same three core cast members in different roles.

A true sequel, The 3 L'il Pigs 2 (Les 3 p'tits cochons 2), was released in 2016, from the same writers but directed by Jean-François Pouliot. While Guillaume Lemay-Thivierge, Paul Doucet, Sophie Prégent and Isabel Richer all reprised their roles, Claude Legault did not, so Mathieu was instead played by Patrice Robitaille.

A French remake entitled The Big Bad Wolf (Le Grand Méchant Loup) was released in 2013. The film was written and directed by filmmaking duo Nicolas & Bruno and stars Benoît Poelvoorde, Kad Merad, Fred Testot, Valérie Donzelli, Charlotte Le Bon, Zabou Breitman, Cristiana Reali, Léa Drucker and Linh Dan Pham among others.

== Awards ==
Award	Year	Category	Recipient	Result	Ref
Genie Awards	2008	Best Actor	Claude Legault	Nominated	
Genie Awards	2008	Best Supporting Actor	Guillaume Lemay-Thivierge	Nominated	
Genie Awards	2008	Best Original Screenplay	Pierre Lamothe, Claude Lalonde	Nominated	
Genie Awards	2008	Best Editing	Jean-François Bergeron	Nominated	
Genie Awards	2008	Golden Screen Award	Pierre Gendron, Christian Larouche	Won	
Jutra Awards	2008	Best Film	Pierre Gendron, Christian Larouche	Nominated	
Jutra Awards	2008	Best Actor	Claude Legault	Nominated	
Jutra Awards	2008	Best Actress	Isabel Richer	Nominated	
Jutra Awards	2008	Best Supporting Actor	Paul Doucet	Nominated	
Jutra Awards	2008	Best Supporting Actor	Guillaume Lemay-Thivierge	Nominated	
Jutra Awards	2008	Best Supporting Actress	Julie Perreault	Nominated	
Jutra Awards	2008	Best Screenplay	Pierre Lamothe, Claude Lalonde	Nominated	
Jutra Awards	2008	Best Art Direction	Gilles Aird	Nominated	
Jutra Awards	2008	Best Cinematography	Bernard Couture	Nominated	
Jutra Awards	2008	Best Costume Design	Monic Ferland	Nominated	
Jutra Awards	2008	Best Hair	Johanne Paiement	Nominated	
Jutra Awards	2008	Best Makeup	Marlène Rouleau	Nominated	
Jutra Awards	2008	Best Original Music	Stéphane Dufour	Nominated	
Jutra Awards	2008	Billet d'or	Pierre Gendron, Christian Larouche	Won	
Jutra Awards	2009	Most Successful Film Outside Quebec	Patrick Huard	Nominated	
