= Maman Last Call =

- Directed by: François Bouvier
- Written by: Nathalie Petrowski
- Based on: Maman Last Call by Nathalie Petrowski
- Produced by: Pierre Gendron; Christian Larouche
- Starring: Sophie Lorain; Patrick Huard; Stéphane Demers; Julie Le Breton; Anne-Marie Cadieux
- Cinematography: Allen Smith
- Edited by: Claude Palardy
- Music by: Michel Corriveau
- Distributed by: Christal Films
- Release date: February 11, 2005
- Running time: 96 minutes
- Country: Canada
- Language: French

Maman Last Call is a Canadian comedy-drama film, released in 2005. An adaptation of Nathalie Petrowski's 1995 novel, the film was written by Petrowski and directed by François Bouvier.

The film stars Sophie Lorain as Alice Malenfant, a career-oriented journalist who has resisted marrying and start a family with her boyfriend Louis (Patrick Huard), but unexpectedly finds herself pregnant.

Petrowski garnered a Genie Award nomination for Best Adapted Screenplay at the 26th Genie Awards.
