= Exile (2012 film) =

- French: Exil
- Directed by: Charles-Olivier Michaud
- Written by: Charles-Olivier Michaud; Thor Bishopric
- Produced by: Réal Chabot
- Starring: Francis Cleophat; Stephen McHattie; Julie Le Breton; Paul Doucet
- Cinematography: Jean-François Lord
- Edited by: Glenn Berman
- Music by: Michel Corriveau
- Production company: Les Films du boulevard
- Distributed by: Filmoption
- Release date: November 2012 (FCIAT)
- Running time: 90 minutes
- Country: Canada
- Languages: English; French

Exile (French: Exil) is a 2012 Canadian drama film, directed by Charles-Olivier Michaud. The film stars Francis Cleophat as Samuel, a teenager in Haiti who is left alone after his father is kidnapped by government forces; learning that his mother whom he had long been told was dead is in fact still alive and merely ran off to the United States, he embarks on a quest to find her, and is helped by various "guardian angels" as he travels to Miami, New York City and Montreal in his search.

The film's cast also includes Paul Doucet, Julie Le Breton, Stephen McHattie, Maxime Dumontier, Mireille Métellus and Ralph Prosper, and includes narration by writer and broadcaster Stanley Péan.

Brendan Kelly of the Montreal Gazette reviewed the film favourably, writing that although the film's plot posed possible suspension of disbelief problems in the way Samuel is continually protected in his journey, the film was clearly meant to be seen as an allegory for Samuel's passage into manhood.

The film premiered at the Abitibi-Témiscamingue International Film Festival in 2012, before opening commercially in June 2014.

Michel Corriveau received a Jutra Award nomination for Best Original Music at the 17th Jutra Awards in 2015.
