= La Garde (film) =

2014 Canadian drama film

- Directed by: Sylvain Archambault
- Written by: Daniel Diaz; Ludovic Huot; Ian Lauzon
- Produced by: Luc Martineau; Lorraine Richard
- Starring: Paul Doucet; Antoine L'Écuyer; Sandrine Bisson
- Cinematography: Christophe Graillot; Jérôme Sabourin
- Edited by: Yvann Thibaudeau
- Music by: Michel Corriveau
- Production company: Cité-Amérique
- Distributed by: Christal Films
- Release date: April 4, 2014
- Running time: 91 minutes
- Country: Canada
- Language: French

La Garde is a Canadian drama film, directed by Sylvain Archambault and released in 2014.

The film stars Paul Doucet as Luc Bissailon, a father who abducts his son Samuel (Antoine L'Écuyer) after losing custody in his separation from ex-wife Sylvie (Sandrine Bisson). He takes Samuel to a wilderness location on a hunting trip, only for Samuel to be forced to walk back to town to seek medical help after an accident with the gun results in Luc getting shot.

The film opened in theatres on April 4, 2014.

Danielle Huard received a Jutra Award nomination for Best Makeup at the 17th Jutra Awards in 2015.
