= Susan Shipton =

Canadian film editor

- Born: 1958; Toronto, Ontario
- Occupation: Film editor

Susan Shipton (born 1958 in Toronto, Ontario) is a Canadian film editor.

Shipton has collaborated with director Atom Egoyan on eight projects. Her editing credits include The Adjuster, Love and Death on Long Island, Mr. Nobody, I Love a Man in Uniform, Foolproof, When Night Is Falling, Breakfast with Scot, Exotica, Where the Truth Lies, Long Day's Journey into Night, Chloe and The Captive. She also wrote, produced, and directed the short film Hindsight.

Shipton has been nominated for the Genie Award for Best Achievement in Editing six times and has won twice, for The Sweet Hereafter in 1997 and Possible Worlds in 2001. She also won the 2005 Directors Guild of Canada Craft Award for Being Julia.

Shipton is a member of the Canadian Cinema Editors honours society.
