= Red Nose (film) =

2003 Canadian romantic comedy film

- French: Nez rouge
- Directed by: Érik Canuel
- Written by: Sylvie Desrosiers; Sylvie Poulin
- Produced by: Jacques Bonin; Claude Veillet
- Starring: Patrick Huard; Michèle-Barbara Pelletier
- Cinematography: Bernard Couture
- Edited by: Jean-François Bergeron
- Music by: Michel Corriveau
- Release date: November 28, 2003
- Running time: 114 minutes
- Country: Canada
- Language: French

Red Nose (French: Nez rouge) is a 2003 Canadian romantic comedy film, directed by Érik Canuel. Starring Patrick Huard as Félix Legendre, an acerbic literary critic, and Michèle-Barbara Pelletier as Céline Bourgeois, a writer whose most recent work he harshly trashed, the film traces their journey from hate at first sight to falling in love when they are unexpectedly assigned as each other's partners while volunteering for Quebec's annual Opération Nez rouge Christmas driving service.

The film's cast also includes Pierre Lebeau, Jacques Godin, Christian Bégin, Caroline Dhavernas, Sylvain Marcel, Stéphane Breton, Frédéric Desager and Dany Laferrière.

Claudette Casavant received a Prix Jutra nomination for Best Makeup, at the 6th Jutra Awards, for her work on the film.
