= Hemingway: A Portrait =

- Directed by: Érik Canuel
- Written by: Bernard Lajoie
- Produced by: Bernard Lajoie; Tatsuo Shimamura
- Starring: William J. Waterbury; Martin Watier; David Lebel Bouchard
- Narrated by: Marc Strange
- Cinematography: Allen Smith
- Edited by: Denis Papillon
- Music by: Michel Corriveau
- Production companies: Imagica; Les Productions Pascal Blais; Panorama Films
- Distributed by: Direct Cinema Limited
- Release date: 1999
- Running time: 18 minutes
- Country: Canada
- Language: English

Hemingway: A Portrait is a 1999 Canadian short docudrama film, directed by Érik Canuel. The film portrays a film crew putting together a newsreel retrospective about the life of Ernest Hemingway following his death in 1961.

The film was distributed as part of a double bill with Aleksandr Petrov's animated film The Old Man and the Sea.

== Awards ==
The film won the Genie Award for Best Short Documentary at the 20th Genie Awards in 2000.
