= Michel Corriveau =

Canadian music composer

- Born: June 29, 1962 (age 63); Grand-Mère, Quebec
- Occupation: Music composer

Michel Corriveau (born June 29, 1962) is a Canadian composer of film and television scores from Quebec. He has received multiple nominations and awards throughout his career for Canadian and international films and TV productions

== Biography ==
Based in Montreal, Michel Corriveau was raised in Grand-Mère, Quebec. His maternal grandfather, Philippe Filion, was an orchestral conductor for whom the main concert hall at the Centre des arts de Shawinigan in Shawinigan is named, and served as lieutenant chief of music for the Department of National Defense.

His musical career started in 1986 when he joined Luba's band as a keyboardist and accordionist. At the same time, he worked on multiple projects with keyboardist Jean-Alain Roussel, including albums by Céline Dion, Corey Hart and Martine St-Clair.

Over the years, he composed the music for international advertising campaigns, including for McDonald's, and for over 50 Canadian and international movies and television series. He has received multiple nominations for his work at the Genie and Canadian Screen Awards, the Quebec Cinema (Jutra/Iris) Awards, the Gemini Awards and the Prix Gémeaux, as well as winning awards from the Société professionnelle des auteurs et des compositeurs du Québec and the Society of Composers, Authors and Music Publishers of Canada.

He now works with his son, Jérémie Corriveau.

In addition to his work in film and television, he has also released two albums as a composer of electroacoustic music, Omni (2014) and Omnitudes (2018).

== Filmography ==
=== Films ===
- 1999 - Hemingway: A Portrait
- 2000 - Slow Burn
- 2002 - Matthew Blackheart: Monster Smasher
- 2002 - Family Jewel
- 2003 - Red Nose (Nez rouge)
- 2004 - The Last Tunnel (Le Dernier tunnel)
- 2004 - The Incomparable Miss C. (L'incomparable Mademoiselle C.)
- 2005 - Maman Last Call
- 2005 - The Outlander (Le Survenant)
- 2005 - Miss Météo
- 2006 - Bon Cop, Bad Cop
- 2006 - Answered by Fire
- 2008 - Accidental Friendship
- 2008 - Honey, I'm in Love (Le Grand Départ)
- 2009 - The Canadiens, Forever (Pour toujours, les Canadiens!)
- 2009 - Free Fall (Les Pieds dans le vide)
- 2009 - Cadavres
- 2010 - Piché: The Landing of a Man (Piché : entre ciel et terre)
- 2011 - French Kiss
- 2011 - Barrymore
- 2012 - Ésimésac
- 2012 - Exile (Exil)
- 2013 - House of Versace
- 2013 - Moroccan Gigolos
- 2013 - Lac Mystère
- 2014 - La Garde
- 2015 - Bad Hair Day
- 2015 - Anna
- 2017 - Undercover Grandpa
- 2018 - Just a Breath Away (Dans la brûme)
- 2019 - Radio Silence
- 2020 - Glass Houses
- 2021 - One of a Kind Love
- 2021 - You May Kiss the Bridesmaid
- 2022 - Snow Angel
- 2023 - Ru
- 2024 - All Stirred Up! (Tous toqués!)

=== Series ===
- 2008 - Windfall and Misfortunes (Les Lavigueur)
- 2000-2001 - Treasure
- 2009 - The Phantom
- 2012 - Adam et Ève
- 2012 - Category 8
- 2013 - Tempête solaire : Au péril de la Terre
- 2013-2015 - Waterfront Cities of the World
- 2014-2018 - Mensonges
- 2014-2018 - Boomerang
- 2015-2018 - Versailles
- 2016 - Prémonitions
- 2016-2021 - True North (Les Pays d'en haut)
- 2017 - Acceptable Risk
- 2019 - Fragile
- 2019 - Les Bogues de la vie
- 2021 - Hidden Assets
- 2021 - Moi non plus!
- 2022 - Aller simple

== Awards ==
Year	Award	Ceremony	Work	Result	Ref(s)
2005	Genie Award for Best Original Score	25th Genie Awards	The Last Tunnel (Le Dernier tunnel)	Nominated	
2005	Jutra Award for Best Original Music	7th Jutra Awards	The Last Tunnel (Le Dernier tunnel)	Nominated	
2006	Genie Award for Best Original Song	26th Genie Awards	The Outlander (Le Survenant) — "Comme un plume au vent" (with Sylvain Cossette, Robert Marchand)	Nominated	
2007	Jutra Award for Best Original Music	9th Jutra Awards	Bon Cop, Bad Cop	Nominated	
2007	Best Original Music Score for a Program or Miniseries	22nd Gemini Awards	Answered by Fire	Nominated	
2008	Best Original Music - Dramatic	Gémeaux Awards	Les Lavigueur	Nominated	
2011	Best Original Music for a Program or Series - Dramatic or Documentary	Gémeaux Awards	Waterfront Cities of the World	Nominated	
2013	Jutra Award for Best Original Music	15th Jutra Awards	Ésimésac	Nominated	
2014	Richard Grégoire Award	Société professionnelle des auteurs et des compositeurs du Québec		Won	
2014	Best Musical Theme	Gémeaux Awards	Mensonges	Nominated	
2014	Best Original Music - Dramatic	Gémeaux Awards	Mensonges	Nominated	
2015	Jutra Award for Best Original Music	17th Jutra Awards	Exile (Exil)	Nominated	
2015	Best Original Music - Dramatic	Gémeaux Awards	Mensonges	Nominated	
2016	Prix Iris for Best Original Music	18th Quebec Cinema Awards	Anna	Nominated	
2016	Canadian Screen Award for Best Original Score	4th Canadian Screen Awards	Anna	Nominated	
2017	Composer of the Year	Society of Composers, Authors and Music Publishers of Canada	True North (Les Pays d'en haut)	Won	
2017	Best Original Music - Dramatic	Gémeaux Awards	Lâcher prise	Nominated	
2017	Best Original Music for a Program or Series - Dramatic	Gémeaux Awards	Prémonitions	Nominated	
2017	Best Original Music for a Program or Series - Dramatic	Gémeaux Awards	True North (Les Pays d'en haut)	Nominated	
2018	Best Original Music - Dramatic	Gémeaux Awards	True North (Les Pays d'en haut)	Nominated	
2019	Best Musical Theme	Gémeaux Awards	Mensonges	Nominated	
2019	Best Original Music - Dramatic	Gémeaux Awards	True North (Les Pays d'en haut)	Nominated	
2020	Best Original Music for a Program or Series - Dramatic	Gémeaux Awards	True North (Les Pays d'en haut)	Won	
2021	Best Original Music Score - Program or Series	Gémeaux Awards	True North (Les Pays d'en haut)	Won	
2021	Best Music Theme	Gémeaux Awards	True North (Les Pays d'en haut)	Won	
