= Gilles Maheu =

Canadian actor, playwright and director

Gilles Maheu (born 1948 in Montreal, Quebec) is a Canadian actor, playwright and director from Quebec. He is most noted for his starring role in the film Night Zoo (Un Zoo la nuit), for which he was a Genie Award nominee for Best Actor at the 9th Genie Awards in 1988, and as the founder and artistic director of the influential Montreal theatre and dance company Carbone 14.

In 1992, he was one of the recipients of the inaugural Governor General's Performing Arts Awards for his work with Carbone 14. In 1998, he directed the premiere productions of the musical Notre-Dame de Paris.
