= Jean-François Bergeron (film editor) =

Canadian film editor

Jean-François Bergeron is a Canadian film editor, most noted as a winner of the Jutra Award for Best Editing at the 9th Jutra Awards in 2007 for his work on Bon Cop, Bad Cop. He has also been nominated in the same category four other times, and is a five-time Genie Award nominee for Best Editing.

== Recognition ==
=== Genie and Canadian Screen Awards ===
- 20th Genie Awards (1999): Alegría (nominated with Yves Langois)
- 25th Genie Awards (2004): The Last Tunnel (Le Dernier tunnel)
- 27th Genie Awards (2006): Bon Cop, Bad Cop
- 28th Genie Awards (2007): The 3 L'il Pigs (Les 3 p'tits cochons)
- 32nd Genie Awards (2011): The Year Dolly Parton Was My Mom

=== Prix Jutra/Iris ===
- 5th Jutra Awards (2003): The Mysterious Miss C. (La Mystérieuse mademoiselle C.)
- 7th Jutra Awards (2005): The Last Tunnel (Le Dernier tunnel)
- 9th Jutra Awards (2007): Bon Cop, Bad Cop – won
- 14th Jutra Awards (2012): A Sense of Humour (Le Sens de l'humour)
- 19th Quebec Cinema Awards (2017): The 3 L'il Pigs 2 (Les 3 p'tits cochons 2)

== Filmography ==
- 2 Mayhem 3 – 1996
- Polygraph (Le polygraphe) – 1996
- Platinum – 1997
- Alegría – 1998
- Agent Provocateur – 1998
- The Secret Adventures of Jules Verne (episode "Rockets of the Dead") – 2000
- Café Olé – 2000
- The List – 2000
- The Pig's Law (La loi du cochon) – 2001
- The Mysterious Miss C. (La mystérieuse mademoiselle C.) – 2002
- Lathe of Heaven – 2002
- Red Nose (Nez rouge) – 2003
- The Last Tunnel (Le dernier tunnel) – 2004
- Battle of the Brave (Nouvelle-France) – 2004
- Bon Cop, Bad Cop – 2006
- The Rip-Off – 2006
- Without Her (Sans elle) – 2006
- Les Boys (3 episodes) – 2008
- Nothing Really Matters – 2008
- Honey, I'm in Love (Le grand départ) – 2008
- Father and Guns (De père en flic) – 2009
- Detour (Détour) – 2009
- The Child Prodigy (L'Enfant prodige) – 2010
- File 13 (Filière 13) – 2010
- Barrymore – 2011
- The Year Dolly Parton Was My Mom – 2011
- A Sense of Humour (Le Sens de l'humour) – 2011
- Guardian Angel (L'Ange gardien) – 2014
- The Far Shore (Dérive) – 2018
- You Will Remember Me (Tu te souviendras de moi) – 2020
- My Mother's Men (Les Hommes de ma mère) – 2023
- Bon Cop, Bad Cop - 2026, television series
- Redemptions (Rédemptions) - 2026
