= Pierre Gendron (producer) =

Canadian film producer

Pierre Gendron (born 1952) is a Canadian film producer from Quebec, who was co-founder with Roger Frappier of the Max Films studio. He is most noted as a two-time winner of the Genie Award for Best Motion Picture as a producer of the films Night Zoo (Un zoo la nuit) at the 9th Genie Awards in 1988, and Jesus of Montreal (Jésus de Montréal) at the 11th Genie Awards in 1990.

== Filmography ==
- 1984 - Sonatine
- 1986 - The Decline of the American Empire (Le Déclin de l'empire américain)
- 1987 - Night Zoo (Un zoo la nuit)
- 1988 - Road to Damascus (Le Chemin de Damas)
- 1989 - Jesus of Montreal (Jésus de Montréal)
- 1990 - Un autre homme
- 1990 - Moody Beach
- 1990 - Ding et Dong (Ding et Dong, le film)
- 1993 - The Sex of the Stars (Le Sexe des étoiles)
- 1995 - Kabloonak
- 2002 - North Station (Station Nord)
- 2004 - The Last Tunnel (Le Dernier Tunnel)
- 2005 - Maman Last Call
- 2006 - Without Her (Sans elle)
- 2007 - The 3 L'il Pigs (Les 3 P'tits Cochons)
- 2009 - Cadavres
- 2010 - File 13 (Filière 13)
- 2010 - 10½
- 2016 - The 3 L'il Pigs 2 (Les 3 P'tits Cochons 2)
