= Desastre =

2004 Canadian film

- Directed by: Jay Field
- Written by: Jay Field
- Starring: Kendall Negro
- Cinematography: Brett Van Dyke
- Edited by: Ross Birchall
- Release date: April 2004 (WorldFest Houston)
- Running time: 10 minutes
- Country: Canada
- Language: English

Desastre is a Canadian short comedy film, directed by Jay Field and released in 2004. A parody of the cultural divide between English and French Canadians, the film stars Kendall Negro as a young boy who is culturally French despite having been born to an English-speaking family.

The cast also includes Irene Burns, Lada Darewych, Max Farnell, Paul Fowles, Tanya Fraser, Jamie Levack, Douglas Tardif, Thomas Timmerman and Julie Wiarda.

The film premiered at the WorldFest-Houston International Film Festival in 2004, and had its Canadian premiere at the 2004 Toronto International Film Festival.

The film was a Genie Award nominee for Best Live Action Short Drama at the 25th Genie Awards in 2005.

== Cast ==
- Irene Burns
- Max Farnell
- Paul Fowles as Office Friend #1
- Jamie Levack
- Thomas Timmerman
- Lada Darewych as Olga
- Geoff the Force as Football Player
- Tanya Fraser as Ashley
- Douglas Tardif as Gregoire
- Julie Wiarda
