= The 3 L'il Pigs 2 =

2016 film by Jean-François Pouliot

- Theatrical release poster
- Les 3 p'tits cochons 2
- Directed by: Jean-François Pouliot
- Written by: Claude Lalonde; Pierre Lamothe
- Produced by: Pierre Gendron; Christian Larouche
- Starring: Patrice Robitaille; Guillaume Lemay-Thivierge; Paul Doucet
- Cinematography: Bernard Couture
- Edited by: Jean-François Bergeron
- Music by: Martin Léon
- Distributed by: Christal Films
- Release date: July 1, 2016
- Running time: 102 minutes
- Country: Canada
- Language: French

The 3 L'il Pigs 2 (French: Les 3 p'tits cochons 2) is a Canadian French-language comedy film, directed by Jean-François Pouliot and released in 2016. A sequel to the 2007 film The 3 L'il Pigs (Les 3 p'tits cochons), the film revisits the brothers five years after the death of their mother, older and slightly wiser but still struggling with the demands of monogamy in their marriages. However, Claude Legault did not reprise the role of Mathieu, who was instead played in the sequel by Patrice Robitaille.

Rémi (Paul Doucet) is dealing with both the fallout of cheating on his wife Dominique (Sophie Prégent) with another woman on a business trip, and his unresolved bisexuality after experiencing a strong attraction to a young man who helps him after a fainting spell in the street. Christian (Guillaume Lemay-Thivierge), whose girlfriend Hélène has left him, moves into Rémi and Dominique's house after Rémy leaves, but begins falling in love with Dominique. Mathieu (Robitaille) falls off the roof of his house and is recuperating in a body cast, but finds himself more sexually excited by the nurse who comes in to take care of him than he is by his wife Geneviève (Isabel Richer).

== Awards ==
Jean-François Bergeron received a Prix Iris nomination for Best Editing at the 19th Quebec Cinema Awards.

The film was the top-grossing Canadian film of 2016, winning both the Golden Reel Award from the Canadian Screen Awards and the Guichet d'or from Telefilm Canada. However, it was not as successful at the box office as the first film. It was also a nominee for the Prix Iris Public Prize, but did not win as the award had transitioned by that time from a straight prize to the top box office performer into an audience-voted award.
