= Blood (2004 film) =

2004 film by Jerry Ciccoritti

- Directed by: Jerry Ciccoritti
- Written by: Jerry Ciccoritti
- Based on: Blood by Tom Walmsley
- Produced by: Joel Awerbuck; Anna Gerb
- Starring: Jacob Tierney; Emily Hampshire
- Cinematography: Gerald Packer
- Edited by: James Bredin; George Roulston
- Music by: Robert Carli
- Production companies: Spank Films; Playtlet Productions
- Release date: September 10, 2004 (TIFF)
- Running time: 90 minutes
- Country: Canada
- Language: English

Blood is a 2004 Canadian drama film directed by Jerry Ciccoritti. Based on the theatrical play by Tom Walmsley, the film stars Jacob Tierney as Chris Terry, a bisexual recovering drug addict and alcoholic who visits his prostitute sister Noelle (Emily Hampshire) for the first time in five years, only to be asked to have a threesome with Noelle and her client.

The film was shot over four days by having Tierney and Hampshire perform the complete play eight times, and then editing to use the best take for each scene. The original play was written for older actors, but Ciccoritti chose to cast Tierney and Hampshire, both of whom he had worked with before, after the actors he had originally planned to cast were unavailable.

The film premiered at the 2004 Toronto International Film Festival.

The film received two Genie Award nominations at the 25th Genie Awards in 2005, for Best Actress (Hampshire) and Best Original Screenplay (Ciccoritti). Ciccoritti also received a Directors Guild of Canada award nomination in 2005.

== Cast ==
- Emily Hampshire as Noelle Terry
- Jacob Tierney as Chris Terry
