= Machine Gun Molly (film) =

- French: Monica la mitraille
- Directed by: Pierre Houle
- Written by: Luc Dionne; Sylvain Guy
- Based on: Souvenirs de Monica by Georges-Hébert Germain
- Produced by: Luc Martineau; Lorraine Richard
- Starring: Céline Bonnier; Roy Dupuis; Patrick Huard; Rémy Girard
- Edited by: Gaétan Huot
- Music by: Michel Cusson
- Release date: April 30, 2004
- Running time: 125 minutes
- Country: Canada
- Language: French

Machine Gun Molly (French: Monica la mitraille) is a 2004 Canadian crime drama film, directed by Pierre Houle. Based on the life of Monica Proietti, the film stars Céline Bonnier as Monique Sparvieri, a woman in Montreal who despite the odds turns to and excels in, the primarily male dominated field that is, the life of bank robbery. The film's cast also includes Roy Dupuis, Patrick Huard, Marc Labrèche, Isabelle Blais, Luc Roy, Louis-Philippe Dury and Rémy Girard.

== Plot ==
Monique Sparvieri, oldest daughter to an impoverished Montreal family vows to find a way out of the ghetto which she calls home. After the abandonment of Michael, the love of her life, Monique finds herself alone yet again, once her second husband, Gaston, is sentenced to ten months in prison. While other girls her age were still fantasizing about their Prince Charming, and being married off into a better life, Monique took matters into her own hands. Her and her new love, Gerald Simard, plan a series of bank robberies to help them alleviate their current financial stress. Infatuated by love and success, Monique is fearless in her pursuit of crime, as she tirelessly ensures her children do not experience the same miserable upbringing as she once did.

== Cast ==
- Céline Bonnier
- Roy Dupuis
- Patrick Huard
- Rémy Girard

== Career ==
Monique Sparvieri's character is based on the real-life story of Monica Proietti. Living with eight other siblings, Proietti was introduced to the life of crime at a young age to help support the family. Her grandmother ran a veritable school on stealing for impoverished kids in the neighbourhood. Proietti's second husband however, Viateur Tessier, is the person who mainly set Monica along her path of crime, being a noted criminal himself. He was the one who taught her all the tricks of the bank robbing trade. Much like any industry, Proietti started at the bottom, working as the getaway car driver and similarly smaller roles in several bank robberies. It didn't take long for Proietti to rise among the ranks as her male cohorts recognized and were impressed by her "ice nerves" and "how she could handle a machine gun", as stated by Montreal Star Reporter Tim Burke. During her two-year bank robbing spree, Monica Proietti became somewhat of a media darling. The French media called her Monica la Matraille while the anglophone papers coined her, "Machine Gun Molly". Despite her infamy, Monica was able to outwit authorities for two years due to clever disguises, as she appeared male during heists and switched back into more feminine clothing right afterwards. During her career, it is believed that she accumulated over $100,000 (over $650,000 in today's standard) from twenty different establishments. By September 1967, Monica grew tired of her life of crime and decided to pull off one more job and then retire. Her plan to rob the Caisse Populaire in Montreal- Nord however, would be her last, as she would be shot twice mid - heist.

== Recognition ==
The film garnered seven Genie Award nominations at the 25th Genie Awards, for Best Director (Houle), Best Actress (Bonnier), Best Adapted Screenplay (Luc Dionne and Sylvain Guy), Art Direction/Production Design (Michel Proulx), Costume Design (Michèle Hamel), Sound Editing (Marcel Pothier, Natalie Fleurant, Guy Francoeur, Carole Gagnon and Antoine Morin) and Original Song ("Le Blues de Monica" by Lorraine Richard, Michel Cusson and Pierre Houle). It won the award for Best Adapted Screenplay.
