= Tom Walmsley =

Canadian writer

Tom Walmsley (December 13, 1948 – April 17, 2025) was a Canadian playwright, novelist, poet and screenwriter.

After four years in Liverpool, Walmsley came to Canada with his family in 1952, and was raised in Oshawa, Ontario, and Lorraine, Quebec. He dropped out of high school and battled addictions as a young adult.

In addition to his plays, Walmsley was the winner of the first Three-Day Novel Contest in 1979 for his novel Doctor Tin. He later published a sequel, Shades, and another unrelated novel, Kid Stuff. Walmsley wrote the screenplay for Jerry Ciccoritti's film Paris, France in 1993. Ciccoritti also later adapted Walmsley's play Blood into a film.

Walmsley's most recent play, The Nun's Vacation, "questions the relationship between actions and identities." It premiered in Toronto in 2012, starring Stephen Chambers, Glen Matthews, and Sandy Duarte.

Walmsley's style of writing ranges from the naturalistic to the poetic and, at times, the absurd. He moves easily between dramatic and comedic, and some of his "darkest" work is treated with a cutting sense of humour. His most common themes include sex (both hetero- and homosexual, often involving sado-masochistic fetishes, adulterous affairs, and, in the case of Blood, incest), violence, addiction (to alcohol and heroin in particular), and God (from a Christian perspective). He rarely deals with politics directly, although he openly displays a distaste for middle-class morality and social conservative interpretations of Christianity.

Early in his career, Walmsley summarized his sense of personal identity as "blond, stocky, below average height, uncircumcised, bisexual, tattooed, with bad teeth and very large feet".

Walmsley died in Toronto on April 17, 2025, at the age of 76.

== Plays ==
- The Workingman, 1975
- The Jones Boy, 1977
- Something Red, 1978
- White Boys, 1982
- Getting Wrecked, 1985
- Mr. Nice Guy (with Dolly Reisman), 1985
- Maxine, 1995 (performance piece)
- Blood, 1995 (ISBN 1896239641)
- Delirium, 2006
- 3 Squares a Day, 2006
- Descent, 2006
- The Nun's Vacation, 2012

== Poetry ==
- Rabies, 1975
- Lexington Hero, 1977
- Sin, 2005
- Honeymoon in Berlin, 2005
- What Happened, 2007
- Concrete Sky, 2009
- Rich and Dead as Dogs, 2012
- Sunday, Monday and Tuesday Weld, 2013

== Novels ==
- Doctor Tin, 1979 (ISBN 0-88978-254-7)
- Shades, 1992 (ISBN 0889782547)
- Kid Stuff, 2004 (ISBN 1551521539)
- Dog Eat Rat, 2009 (978-1-894469-42-5)

== Screenplays ==
- Paris, France, 1993
- Blood, 2004 (adaptation by Jerry Ciccoritti)

=== Libretto ===
Julie Sits Waiting 2012
