= John and Michael =

- Directed by: Shira Avni
- Produced by: Shira Avni; Michael Fukushima
- Narrated by: Brian Davis
- Production company: National Film Board of Canada
- Release date: 2004
- Running time: 10 minutes 28 seconds
- Country: Canada
- Language: English

John and Michael is a 2004 animated short by Shira Avni about two men with Down syndrome who share a loving relationship.

The film was animated with clay backlit on plexiglas, to produce a stained glass effect. Avni made over 14,000 paintings to create the film. It is narrated by Brian Davis, who is himself intellectually disabled. John and Michael was co-produced by Avni and Michael Fukushima of the National Film Board of Canada.

== Awards ==
John and Michael received a dozen awards and honours at film festivals, including a Golden Sheaf Award for best Animation, the award for best original screenwriting at the Inside Out Film and Video Festival, the short documentary award at DOXA Documentary Film Festival, the short film award at the Pink Apple film festival, a Silver Remi Award at the WorldFest-Houston International Film Festival as well as the award for best animated short at the Cinequest Film Festival.

- an Honorable Mention at the Lesbian & Gay Film Festival

October 13 to 22 2006, Seattle - USA

- the Jury Prize - Category: Shorts at the OutFlix Film Festival - International GLBT Film Festival

August 4 to 10 2006, Memphis - USA

- the Golden Sheaf Award - Category: Animation at the Golden Sheaf Awards /Short Film and Video Festival

May 25 to 28 2006, Yorkton - Canada

- the Doxa Short Documentary Award at the Doxa - Documentary Film and Video Festival

May 23 to 28 2006, Vancouver - Canada

- the JWR Award for Best Original Screenwriting at the Inside Out Toronto Lesbian and Gay Film and Video Festival

May 18 to 28 2006, Toronto - Canada

- the Short Film Award at the Pink Apple Film Festival

May 4 to 21 2006, Zurich - Switzerland

- the Silver Remi Award at the WorldFest - International Film Festival

April 21 to May 1, 2006, Houston - USA

- the Award for Best Animated Short at Cinequest

March 1 to 12 2006, San Jose - USA

- the Award - Category: Animation 10 – 30 minutes on a theme of disability Picture This Film Festival

February 6 to 10 2006, Calgary - Canada

- the Special Distinction Award by Jury Classe L CAV Rencontres Internationales du Cinéma d'Animation

November 14 to 22 2005, Wissembourg - France

- an Honorable Mention - Catégorie: Arts at the International Film and Video Festival

November 9 to 13 2005, Columbus - USA

- Best Animated Short Award at the Q Cinema: Fort Worth's Gay & Lesbian International Film Festival

May 19 to 22 2005, Fort Worth - USA
