= Mabel's Saga =

- Directed by: JoDee Samuelson
- Produced by: JoDee Samuelson; Kent Martin
- Animation by: JoDee Samuelson
- Production company: National Film Board of Canada
- Release date: June 20, 2004
- Running time: 14 minutes
- Country: Canada

Mabel's Saga is a Canadian animated short film, directed by JoDee Samuelson and released in 2003. The film presents the story of Mabel, a middle-aged woman facing menopause who draws the strength to get through the challenges in her life by imagining herself as the heroine of Viking sagas.

The film premiered on June 20, 2004, at a screening in Samuelson's hometown of Charlottetown, Prince Edward Island.

== Awards ==
The film was screened at the 2004 Montreal World Film Festival, where it won the FedEx Prize for Best Canadian Short and the Jury Prize for Canadian short films. At the 2004 Atlantic Film Festival, it won the award for Best Short Film.

The film was a Genie Award nominee for Best Animated Short at the 25th Genie Awards in 2005.
