= Paris, France (film) =

1993 Canadian film

- Directed by: Jerry Ciccoritti
- Screenplay by: Tom Walmsley
- Based on: The novel by Tom Walmsley
- Produced by: Allan Levine; Eric Norlen
- Starring: Leslie Hope
- Cinematography: Barry Stone
- Edited by: Roushell Goldstein
- Music by: John McCarthy
- Production company: Téléfilm Canada
- Distributed by: Alliance Releasing
- Release date: September 17, 1993 (Toronto Festival of Festivals)
- Running time: 112 minutes
- Country: Canada
- Language: English
- Box office: $44,159

Paris, France is a 1993 Canadian erotic comedy-drama film directed by Jerry Ciccoritti and written by Tom Walmsley. The film was released in February 1995 in the United States.

== Premise ==
Lucy (Leslie Hope), her husband Michael (Victor Ertmanis), and their business partner William (Dan Lett) are the owners of a small publishing company in Toronto. The stability of their lives are thrown into an emotional maelstrom with the arrival of Sloan (Peter Outerbridge), a former boxer-turned-writer whose first book (based on a serial killer) is about to be published by their company. Sloan gets in over his head when he embarks on a steamy affair with the sexually ravenous and frustrated Lucy, who longs to re-create her S&M-filled days in Paris gone by. In addition to her job as publisher, Lucy is also an erotic novelist exploring whether a weekend of sexual passion with Sloan can liberate her from writer's block. But the bisexual Sloan soon embarks on another affair of his own with the openly gay William which leads to sexual confusion for the writer. All in the while, Lucy's befuddled husband, Michael, slowly goes crazy over learning of his wife and business partner's dalliance with his client until he decides to join in on their bed-jumping as well.

== Cast ==
- Leslie Hope as Lucy
- Peter Outerbridge as Sloan
- Victor Ertmanis as Michael
- Dan Lett as William
- Raoul Trujillo as Minter
- Patricia Ciccoritti as Voice of Lucy's mother

== Reviews ==
The film was reviewed by Variety, and described as "a silly farce with few amusing moments and many more boring ones". The San Francisco Chronicle noted that "the film goes as far as a non-pornographic film can go in depicting sexuality" but "Eventually you catch on that the film isn't really making fun of itself so much as making fun of the audience for watching."

== MPAA rating ==
Paris, France is rated NC-17 because of explicit sexual content.

== Awards ==
The film was nominated for two Genie Awards:

- Best Achievement in Cinematography: Barry Stone
- Best Achievement in Film Editing: Roushell Goldstein
