= TV Dinner...Burp! =

2004 Canadian film

- Directed by: Vanessa-Tatjana Beerli
- Written by: Vanessa-Tatjana Beerli
- Produced by: Antonello Cozzolino; Annie Normandin
- Starring: Emmanuel Bilodeau; Anne-Marie Cadieux
- Production company: Facteur 7
- Release date: 2004
- Running time: 10 minutes
- Country: Canada
- Language: French

TV Dinner...Burp! is a Canadian short comedy film, directed by Vanessa-Tatjana Beerli and released in 2004. The film stars Emmanuel Bilodeau as a man looking for his lost cat, and Anne-Marie Cadieux as the host of a television reality show devoted to BDSM who may know the real answer to where the cat is.

The cast also includes Gary Boudreault, Louis Champagne and Muriel Dutil.

The film was a Genie Award nominee for Best Live Action Short Drama at the 25th Genie Awards in 2005.
