= 10½ =

2010 Canadian drama film

10 1/2
- Directed by: Daniel Grou
- Written by: Claude Lalonde
- Produced by: Pierre Gendron
- Starring: Claude Legault; Robert Naylor; Eugénie Beaudry
- Cinematography: Bernard Couture
- Edited by: Valérie Héroux
- Production company: Zoofilms
- Distributed by: Les Films Equinoxe
- Release dates: October 13, 2010 (Festival du Nouveau Cinéma); October 29, 2010 (Quebec)
- Running time: 108 minutes
- Country: Canada
- Language: French
- Budget: CAD $3.9 million

10 1/2 is a 2010 Canadian drama film directed by Daniel Grou and written by Claude Lalonde. It premiered at the Festival du Nouveau Cinéma in Montreal. The story involves a ten-year-old boy called Tommy in the youth-protection system in Quebec.

== Synopsis ==
10 1/2-year-old Tommy is sent to the Tremplin centre after being arrested for a violent act. He seems to only know how to communicate through violence, overwhelming the staff who struggle to understand and correct his behaviour. The movie captures the unpleasant reality of life within a halfway house for juvenile delinquents.

== Cast ==
- Albert Kwan as M. Li
- Claude Legault as Gilles
- Robert Naylor as Tommy
- Martin Dubreuil as Luc Lebeau

== Production ==
The film was written by Claude Lalonde, a former social worker. It was directed by Daniel Grou and produced by Pierre Gendron with a budget of $3.85 million.

The film was shot in the suburbs of Montreal over 28 days, around April 2009.

== Release ==
The film premiered at the Montreal Film Festival in October 2010.

The film was originally scheduled for release in 2009 by distributor Les Films Equinoxe, but was instead released in 2010 by Alliance Vivafilm. International distribution was by Mad Men World Distribution. It has a runtime of 108 minutes and dialog in French. It was rated in seven provinces and territories of Canada, receiving ratings of 18A or R, indicating that it was either recommended or restricted to those 18 years of age or older.

The film was released on DVD by Alliance Vivafilm in 2011.

== Reception ==
=== Critical response ===
In a review for The Montreal Gazette, Brendan Kelly called the film "gripping" and praised the performances of Claude Legault ("so good as Gilles") and Robert Naylor ("a revelation"). He noted, however, that due to the nature of the story, the film was "not much fun to watch".

Film critic Charles-Henri Raymond wrote that the film explores a difficult and rarely examined topic in a cold and brutal manner. He praised the screenplay, noting that Lalonde's experience as a social worker gave the dialog an almost documentary realism.

=== Accolades ===
The film won the 2010 Main Award of Mannheim-Heidelberg at the 59th International Filmfestival Mannheim-Heidelberg.

At the 2010 International Film Festival Bratislava, the film won the FIPRESCI Jury Award and the Student Jury Award, and Robert Naylor won the award for Best Actor.

Claude Legault won Prix Jutra for Best Actor.

The film was also nominated for eight awards at the 31st Genie Awards, including Best Picture, Best Actor, Best Supporting Actor, Best Adapted Screenplay, and Achievements in Direction, in Art Direction, in Cinematography, and in Editing.
