= So the Moon Rises =

2004 Canadian film directed by Marie-Jan Seille

- French: La lune viendra d'elle-même
- Directed by: Marie-Jan Seille
- Written by: Marie-Jan Seille
- Produced by: Marie Darveau; Bernadette Payeur
- Starring: Isabelle Leblanc; France Castel
- Cinematography: Nathalie Moliavko-Visotzky
- Edited by: Annie Jean
- Music by: Charles Papasoff
- Production company: ACPAV
- Distributed by: Christal Films
- Release date: October 22, 2004
- Running time: 90 minutes
- Country: Canada
- Language: French

So the Moon Rises (French: La lune viendra d'elle-même) is a Canadian drama film, directed by Marie-Jan Seille and released in 2004. The film stars Isabelle Leblanc as Aimée, a young woman who is dying of AIDS, and France Castel as Francine, her longtime friend who is acting as her caretaker.

The cast also includes Nathalie Mallette, Dominique Pétin, Denis Bernard, Jean Leloup, Emmanuel Bilodeau and Claude Léveillée.

The film opened theatrically in October 2004.

Charles Papasoff received a Genie Award nomination for Best Original Score at the 25th Genie Awards.
