= Pierre Houle =

Canadian film and television director

Pierre Houle is a Canadian film and television director. He is best known for the 2004 film Machine Gun Molly (Monica la mitraille), for which he garnered a Genie Award nomination for Best Director at the 25th Genie Awards. He was also nominated for Best Original Song, as cowriter with Lorraine Richard and Michel Cusson of the song "Le Blues de Monica".

He was also a director of the television drama series Scoop and Omerta, and won Gémeaux Awards for Best Director of a Drama Series in 1996 and 1998.
