= Mr. Mergler's Gift =

2004 Canadian documentary film

- DVD
- Directed by: Beverly Shaffer
- Produced by: Germaine Ying Gee Wong
- Starring: Daniel Mergler; Xin Ben Yu
- Cinematography: Andrei Khabad; Thomas Vámos
- Edited by: Benjamin Duffield
- Production company: National Film Board of Canada
- Release date: 2004 (MWFF)
- Running time: 30 minutes
- Country: Canada
- Language: English

Mr. Mergler's Gift is a Canadian documentary film, directed by Beverly Shaffer and released in 2004. The film is a portrait of Daniel Mergler, a 77-year-old music teacher in Montreal, Quebec, who has recently been diagnosed with terminal colon cancer, and Xin Ben Yu, a young piano prodigy who has just immigrated to Canada with her family, whom Mergler has decided to take on as his final student before his death.

The film premiered at the 2004 Montreal World Film Festival.

The film received a Genie Award nomination for Best Feature Length Documentary at the 25th Genie Awards in 2005.
