= Hugo Latulippe =

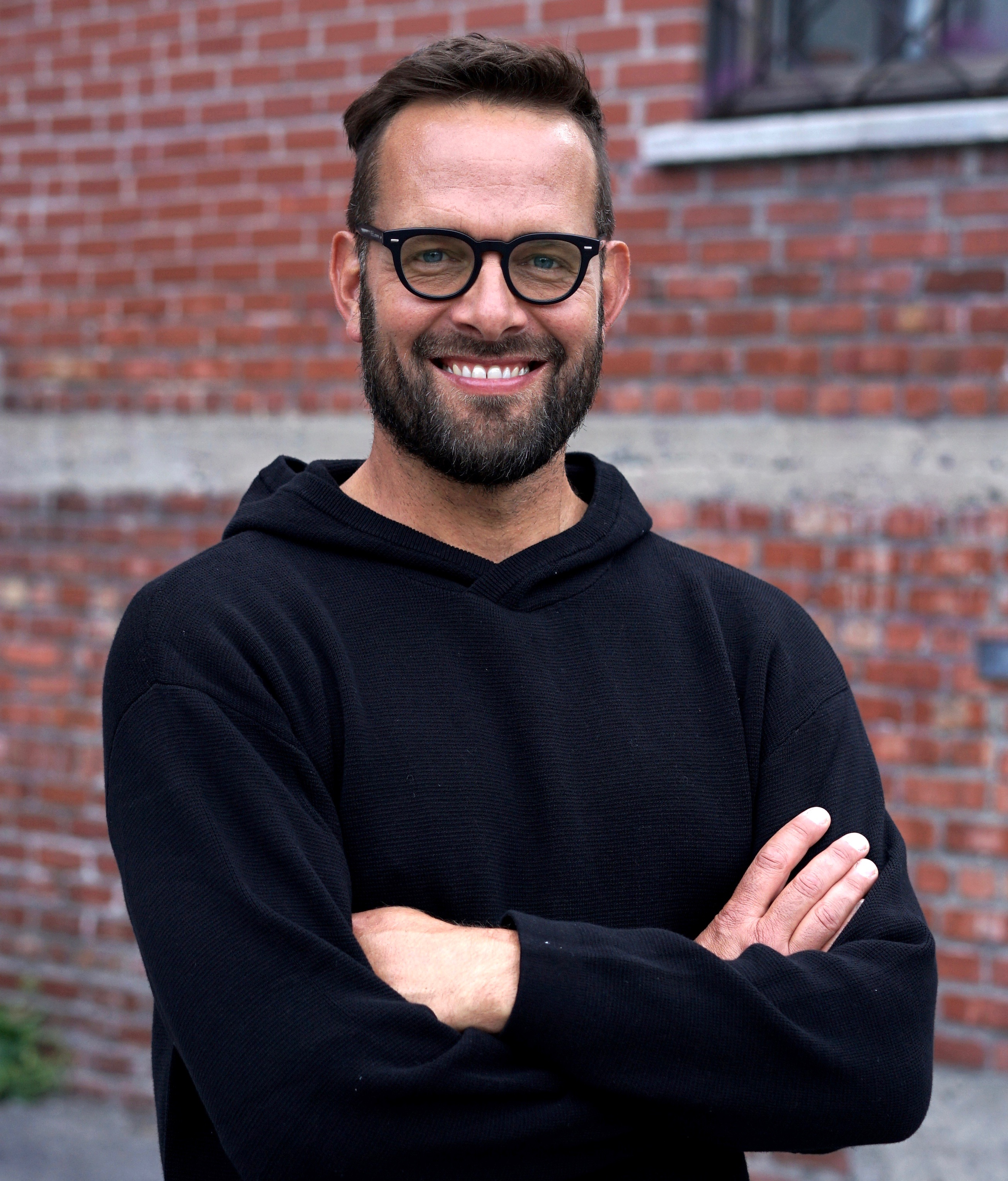
- Born: August 10, 1973 (age 52); Lac-Beauport, Quebec
- Occupation: documentary filmmaker
- Years active: 2000s-present
- Known for: What Remains of Us, Alphée of the Stars

Hugo Latulippe (born June 10, 1973) is a Canadian documentary filmmaker from Quebec, most noted as codirector of the 2004 film What Remains of Us (Ce qu'il reste de nous) and solo director of the 2012 film Alphée of the Stars (Alphée des étoiles).

What Remains of Us was a Genie Award nominee for Best Feature Length Documentary at the 25th Genie Awards and winner of the Jutra Award for Best Documentary Film at the 7th Jutra Awards, while Alphée of the Stars was a Canadian Screen Award nominee for Best Feature Length Documentary at the 1st Canadian Screen Awards in 2012 and a Jutra nominee for Best Documentary at the 15th Jutra Awards.

What Remains of Us was also the winner of the Prix Luc-Perreault in 2004, and was named to the Toronto International Film Festival's annual year-end Canada's Top Ten list that year.

In 2013 he was the patron and curator of the inaugural Festival Vues dans la tête de... film festival in Rivière-du-Loup.

His newest film, Upwelling (Je me soulève), was released in 2022.

In 2023 he was named director-general of the Quebec City Film Festival.

== Personal life ==
He was formerly married to writer and broadcaster Laure Waridel; Alphée of the Stars was about their own family sabbatical with their daughter Alphée, who suffered from developmental disabilities caused by Smith–Lemli–Opitz syndrome.

He subsequently remarried to artist Stéphanie Robert.
