= The Last Tunnel (2004 film) =

- French: Le Dernier tunnel
- Directed by: Érik Canuel
- Written by: Mario Bolduc; Paul Ohl
- Based on: Et que ça saute! by Marcel Talon
- Produced by: Pierre Gendron; Christian Larouche
- Starring: Michel Côté; Jean Lapointe; Christopher Heyerdahl; Sébastien Huberdeau; Céline Bonnier
- Cinematography: Bernard Couture
- Edited by: Jean-François Bergeron
- Music by: Michel Corriveau
- Release date: March 12, 2004
- Running time: 104 minutes
- Country: Canada
- Language: French

The Last Tunnel (French: Le Dernier tunnel) is a 2004 Canadian crime drama film, directed by Érik Canuel. Based on the autobiography of convicted bank robber Marcel Talon, the film stars Michel Côté as a recently released prisoner reuniting his criminal colleagues to pull off one last heist. The cast also includes Jean Lapointe, Christopher Heyerdahl, Sébastien Huberdeau and Céline Bonnier.

== Awards ==
The film garnered eight Genie Award nominations at the 25th Genie Awards:

- Best Actor (Côté)
- Best Supporting Actor (Lapointe)
- Art Direction/Production Design (Jean Bécotte)
- Cinematography (Bernard Couture)
- Editing (Jean-François Bergeron)
- Overall Sound (Dominique Chartrand, Gavin Fernandes and Pierre Paquet)
- Sound Editing (Christian Rivest)
- Achievement in Music: Original Score (Michel Corriveau)

It won the awards for Best Supporting Actor and Best Overall Sound.
