= Happy Camper (film) =

2004 Canadian crime comedy film

- French: Camping sauvage
- Directed by: Sylvain Roy; Guy A. Lepage
- Written by: André Ducharme; Luc Déry; Yves Lapierre
- Produced by: Lyse Lafontaine; Guy A. Lepage; Tony Roman
- Starring: Guy A. Lepage; Sylvie Moreau; Normand D'Amour
- Cinematography: Serge Desrosiers
- Edited by: Yves Chaput
- Music by: Ramachandra Borcar
- Production company: Ciné-Roman
- Release date: July 9, 2004
- Running time: 100 minutes
- Country: Canada
- Language: French

Happy Camper (French: Camping sauvage) is a Canadian crime comedy film, directed by Sylvain Roy and Guy A. Lepage and released in 2004. The film stars Lepage as Pierre-Louis, an investment banker who is forced into witness protection after witnessing a crime committed by Jackhammer, the leader of a local biker gang. Assigned to a rural trailer park with the new name Marcel Paquette, he has to fight to stay alive after the gang organizes a plan to find him and retaliate.

The cast also includes Sylvie Moreau, Normand D'Amour, Réal Bossé, Emmanuel Bilodeau, Louis Champagne and Yves Pelletier.

The film received three Genie Award nominations at the 25th Genie Awards, for Best Art Direction/Production Design (André-Line Beauparlant), Best Costume Design (Sophia Lefebvre) and Best Sound Editing (Guy Pelletier, Claire Pochon, Marie-Claude Gagné, Jean-Philippe Savard and Guy Francoeur). At the 7th Jutra Awards, the film was presented with the Billet d'or as the year's top-grossing Quebec film, and Linda Gordon was nominated for Best Hair.
