= Érik Canuel =

Canadian film and television director (1961–2024)

- Born: 21 January 1961; Montreal, Quebec, Canada
- Died: June 15, 2024 (aged 63); Montreal, Quebec, Canada
- Occupations: Film and television director
- Years active: 1997–2024

Érik Canuel (January 21, 1961 – June 15, 2024) was a Canadian film and television director from Montreal, Quebec.

Canuel, the son of actor Yvan Canuel, began his career in the mid-1980s making music videos for such artists as Paul Piché, Sass Jordan, Norman Iceberg, Vilain Pingouin and Sylvain Cossette. After shooting a number of TV commercials, several of them award-winners, he worked as a director on the television series Big Wolf on Campus, for the Fox network, and The Hunger, broadcast on Showtime and The Movie Network.

In 2000, his IMAX film Hemingway: A Portrait won a Genie Award for best short documentary, as well as the Maximum Image Award for best 2D film at the Miami Aventura Imax Days. Canuel also directed Matthew Blackheart: Monster Smasher in 2000, The Pig's Law (La Loi du cochon) in 2001, Red Nose (Nez rouge) in 2003, The Last Tunnel (Le Dernier Tunnel) in 2004, The Outlander (Le Survenant) in 2005. His best-known film was the bilingual English-French comedy Bon Cop, Bad Cop in 2006, about a francophone detective and an anglophone detective forced to work together on a case. This film received numerous nominations and awards.

In 2010, Canuel directed the episode "Fa la Erica" (season 3, ep. 11) of the TV series Being Erica. In 2016, he directed a segment of the collective film 9 (9, le film).

In 2020, Canuel directed the last four episodes entitled "Collapse", "Orphans", "Relapse" and "The Only Way Out Is Through" of the first season of the TV series Transplant.

He often made cameo appearances in his own films.

Canuel died of plasma cell leukemia on June 15, 2024, at the age of 63.
