= What Remains of Us =

- French: Ce qu'il reste de nous
- Directed by: Hugo Latulippe; François Prévost
- Written by: Hugo Latulippe; François Prévost
- Produced by: Yves Bisaillon; François Prévost
- Starring: Kalsang Dolma; Dalai Lama
- Cinematography: Hugo Latulippe; François Prévost
- Edited by: Annie Jean
- Production company: Nomadik Films
- Distributed by: National Film Board of Canada (NFB)
- Release date: 27 April 2004 (Hot Docs International Documentary Festival)
- Running time: 77 minutes
- Country: Canada
- Languages: English; Tibetan; French

What Remains of Us (French: Ce qu'il reste de nous) is a 2004 Canadian documentary film exploring the survival of the nonviolent resistance movement in Tibet. It was shot over a period of eight years without the knowledge of the Chinese authorities.

== Synopsis ==
A young Tibetan from Québec, Canada, enters her homeland for the first time — carrying a clandestine video message from the 14th Dalai Lama to Tibetans inside Tibet.

== Security ==
Released in 2004, the film raised controversy for showing the faces of 103 Tibetans speaking about human rights. Tibetans were informed of the purpose of the filming. The ones who appear made the choice to participate despite the risks.

Hoping to enhance individual safety as much as possible, the NFB implemented strict security measures to all screenings of the film: no cameras or cell phones were allowed in the theater and security guards were watching the audience with infrared night-vision equipment. The goal was to prevent copies of the images of the faces to reach Beijing PLA offices, where photos would make it easier to track and arrest participants.

According to co-director Francois Prevost, for four years circulation was limited, but in 2008 a decision was made to release the film more widely. By 2011, the film was available on Google Video and YouTube, as well as distributed as a DVD.

So far, according to a private network of information and monitoring, no participant of the film has been arrested in Tibet.

== Credits ==
Produced by François Prévost, written and directed by François Prévost and Hugo Latulippe. Featuring: Kalsang Dolma, Tibetans from inside Tibet, and the 14th Dalai Lama of Tibet. Narrated by Kalsang Dolma. Camera: François Prévost and Hugo Latulippe. Music by: Techung, René Lussier, Kalsang Dolma Editing: Annie Jean. Sound Editing: François Senneville.

Distributed initially in Québec by the National Film Board of Canada (NFB). Later distributed in Canada by Films Séville. Despite the growing success of the film, worldwide distribution had been stopped by the NFB in January 2005 due to the rising costs of security measures surrounding the film.

== Awards ==
- Official Selection, Cannes International Film Festival, 2004
- People's Choice Award, Best Picture, Atlantic Film Festival, Halifax 2004
- Canadian Award, Best Canadian Feature Film, Atlantic Film Festival, Halifax 2004
- Hollywood Discovery Award, Best Documentary, Hollywood Film Festival, Beverly Hills, 2004
- Most Popular Canadian Film, Vancouver International Film Festival, 2004
- Canada's Top Ten, Toronto International Film Festival Group, 2004
- Nomination for Best Documentary, Genie Awards, 2005
- Best Feature Film, Telluride Mountainfilm Festival, 2005
- Best Documentary Film, Prix Jutra, Montreal, 2005
- Audience Award, Festival du Film des Droits de la Personne, Montreal 2006
- First Prize, Grand Prix Sergio Vieira de Mello, Human Rights Film Festival, Geneva 2007
- Nomination for The Norwegian Peace Film Award, Tromsø International Film Festival, 2008
