= Uzeb =

Canadian fusion band

UZEB
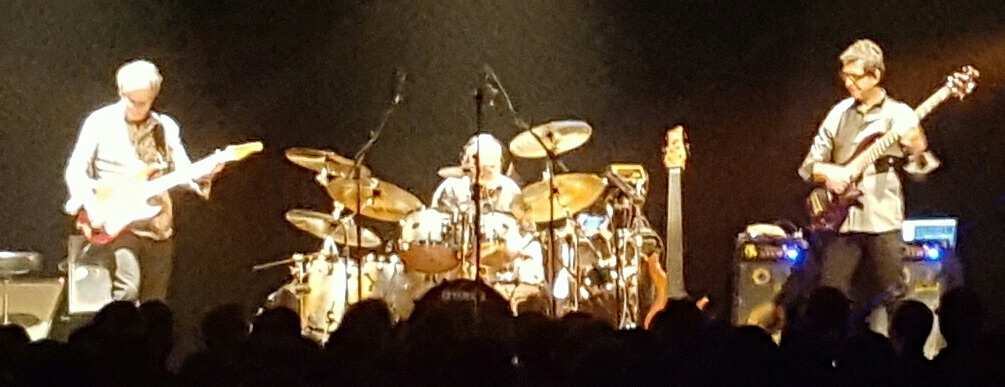
- Uzeb performing in Saint-Eustache, Quebec, 2017

Background information
- Origin: Drummondville, Quebec, Canada
- Genres: Jazz fusion
- Years active: 1976–1992; 2016–present
- Labels: Paroles & Musique, NORAC
- Members: Alain Caron; Michel Cusson; Paul Brochu
- Past members: Jean St. Jacques; Stephan Montanaro; Sylvain Coutu; Michel Cyr

UZEB is a Canadian jazz fusion band from Montreal, Quebec who were active from 1976 to 1992, and reunited in November 2016. The members are Alain Caron (bass guitar), Michel Cusson (guitar), and Paul Brochu (drums). The band won a number of Canadian awards during the 1980s. By 1989, international sales of UZEB's first eight recordings had exceeded 200,000 units, which the Encyclopedia of Music in Canada calls "an unprecedented figure for a Canadian jazz group".

== History ==
UZEB was formed in 1976 in Drummondville, Quebec, when guitarist Michel Cusson and bassist Alain Caron started a jazz duo. The band originally named itself Eusèbe Jazz, their first concert (in Acton Vale, Quebec) being on the name day of St Eusèbe. This name was later shortened to UZEB. The band soon moved to Montreal. Drummer Paul Brochu joined Cusson and Caron in 1978. Until 1987, the band included a keyboardist: first Jean St-Jacques, followed by Stephan Montanaro (featured on the album Live in Bracknell), Sylvain Coutu, and then Michel Cyr. In the 1980s, UZEB had what was then a very technologically advanced MIDI system for its synthesizers.

After 1987, UZEB became a trio consisting of Cusson, Caron, and Brochu. UZEB won Quebec Félix awards as group of the year in 1984 and 1989 (in competition with Quebec pop and rock bands). As well, the band won awards for jazz album of the year in 1983, 1984, 1986, and 1987. UZEB did Quebec-wide and several Canadian tours. In 1991 UZEB received the Oscar Peterson Lifetime Achievement Award, which was presented at the 1991 Montreal International Jazz Festival.

UZEB played its first European concert in 1981 at the Bracknell (England) Jazz Festival. In 1983, UZEB appeared at the Festival de Jazz de Paris and recorded at the Olympia in Paris. UZEB also played in other European countries and in Southeast Asia (in 1990). However, UZEB rarely played concerts in the US. UZEB's most popular songs include "Junk Funk", "Smiles and Chuckles", "Mile 'O'", "60 rue des Lombards", "Spider", and "Uzeb Club".

In 2017, the band reformed for a series of five concerts in Europe and fourteen in Quebec.

== Discography ==
=== Studio albums ===
- Fast Emotion (1983)
- You, Be Easy (1984)
- Between the Lines (1985)
- Noisy Nights (1988)
- UZEB Club (1989)

=== Compilations ===
- Entre Ciel Et Terre (1996)
- Best of Uzeb (2000)

=== Live albums ===
- Live in Bracknell (1981)
- Live à l'Olympia (1986)
- Absolutely Live (with Didier Lockwood) (1986)
- Live in Europe (1988)
- World Tour 90 (1990)
- Reunion Live (2019)

=== Music DVDs ===
- UZEB - The Last Concert (1991)
