= Battle of the Brave =

2004 film

- Quebec release poster
- Nouvelle-France
- Directed by: Jean Beaudin
- Written by: Pierre Billon
- Produced by: Richard Goudreau; Robert Sidaway
- Starring: Noémie Godin-Vigneau; David La Haye; Juliette Gosselin; Sébastien Huberdeau; Gérard Depardieu
- Cinematography: Louis de Ernsted
- Edited by: Jean-François Bergeron; Yves Langlois
- Music by: Patrick Doyle
- Distributed by: Metropolitan Filmexport (France)
- Release date: 19 November 2004
- Running time: 143 minutes
- Countries: Canada; United Kingdom; France
- Languages: French; English
- Budget: CA$30 million
- Box office: $2,057,293

Battle of the Brave (French: Nouvelle-France, lit. 'New France') is a 2004 historical romance film directed by Jean Beaudin, written by Pierre Billon and starring Noémie Godin-Vigneau, David La Haye, Juliette Gosselin, Sébastien Huberdeau, Gérard Depardieu, Bianca Gervais, Irène Jacob, Pierre Lebeau, Vincent Pérez, Isabel Richer, Tim Roth, Jason Isaacs and Colm Meaney. Separate English and French language versions were shot simultaneously. The film cost CA$30 million, making it as of 2004, the most expensive ever made in Quebec.

== Plot ==
In 18th-century Quebec, Trapper François returns to his hometown to visit his father. Unfortunately, his father has just died and François is clueless in regards to the business he just inherited. He trusts his father's lawyer will take care of everything including the claims of creditors who have demanded an investigation.

Like his friend Xavier before François soon develops a crush on Marie-Loup, the town's healer. He is delighted when he sees her protecting an Indian girl against a racist. Both share a deep sympathy for the local tribe and speak its language fluently. Unlike Xavier, who serves the local authorities, François is successful. But after he has become Marie-Loup's lover, he is forced to escape. Right now the local authorities have discovered illegal affairs of his recently inherited company and they hold him responsible.

François hides in the woods among friendly Indians and lets them deliver a letter to Marie-Loup. He is waiting for her to join him, so they can get away together. Unfortunately, she cannot read and needs to ask the local priest what François has written. The priest tells Marie-Loup she had been forsaken by François and persuades her to marry Xavier. The desperate Marie-Loup complies with the ceremony but then refuses Xavier his conjugal rights.

After she has done so for weeks, Xavier visits François in his hideout. He blames his rival for his misfortune and following a fierce fight he leaves him for dead. On his return to Marie-Loup the still furious Xavier utters threats. He does not survive this day.

Xavier's comrades refuse to accept Xavier's death as an accident. Marie-Loup gets accused of murder and witchcraft. François fails to save her and only gets himself arrested. The British authorities, who have meanwhile taken over the formerly French colony, refrain from interfering in this matter for fear to rekindle hostilities.

== Cast ==
- Noémie Godin-Vigneau as Marie-Loup Carignan
- David La Haye as François le Gardeur
- Isabel Richer as France Carignan
- Juliette Gosselin as Young France Carignan
- Sébastien Huberdeau as Xavier Maillaord
- Gérard Depardieu as Father Thomas Blondeau
- Bianca Gervais as Acooooa
- Irène Jacob as Angélique de Roquebrune
- Pierre Lebeau as Joseph Carignan
- Vincent Pérez as Intendant Bigot
- Johanne-Marie Tremblay as Madeleine Carignan
- Tim Roth as William Pitt
- Colm Meaney as Benjamin Franklin
- Jason Isaacs as Major-General James Wolfe
- Michael Maloney as Governor James Murray
- David Troughton as British General
- Micky Sébastian as Marquise de Pompadour
- Paul Savoie as Gouverneur Vaudreuil
- Philippe Dormoy as Voltaire

== See also ==
- Nouvelle-France (soundtrack)
