= Bittersweet Memories (film) =

- French: Ma vie en cinémascope
- Directed by: Denise Filiatrault
- Written by: Denise Filiatrault
- Produced by: Daniel Louis; Denise Robert
- Starring: Pascale Bussières; Michel Barrette
- Cinematography: Pierre Mignot
- Edited by: Yvann Thibaudeau
- Music by: Jean Robitaille; Jean-Sébastien Robitaille; Paul Bisson
- Distributed by: Alliance Atlantis Vivafilm
- Release date: December 2004
- Running time: 105 minutes
- Country: Canada
- Language: French

Bittersweet Memories (French: Ma vie en cinémascope, lit. 'My Life in Cinemascope')is a Quebec, Canada film released in 2004. This biographical drama depicted the career of Quebec singer Alys Robi, as portrayed by Pascale Bussières. The film makes use of flashback sequences in order to connect her childhood, adolescence and adulthood to her later emotional crisis.

== Plot ==
Alice, later Alys, is a teenager who wants to go to Montreal to have a career as a singer.She receives an offer to join Jean Grimaldi's comedy show, and begins an affair with his married son Olivier, despite her Catholic upbringing.

Canada joins the Allies in the Second World War, with protests in Quebec against conscription.Alys begins touring Quebec's military bases, giving her a successful career as a pin-up girl.She eventually meets Lucio Agostini, a composer and married man, who gets her a job with the Canadian Broadcasting Corporation.She wants him to marry her, which he refuses, which triggers her descent into addiction and depression.

Her condition worsens when her little brother Gerard is diagnosed with spina bifida, a birth defect that will later take his life.She is eventually diagnosed with hebephrenia, a form of schizophrenia.She spends five and a half years in an asylum, receiving multiple electroshock therapies and a lobotomy.The treatment is successful, and she returns to her career.

== About the film ==
Adèle Reinhardt, who plays the role of Alys Robi's grandmother in this film, has already worked with Denise Filiatrault in the past on the film adaptations of the literary works of Quebec author Michel Tremblay : C't'à ton tour, Laura Cadieux and Laura Cadieux... la suite.

Lise Dion, who plays the role of Manda Parent in the film, was also one of her colleagues in the television series Le Petit Monde de Laura Cadieux, which was also directed by Denise Filiatrault.
