= Prix Iris for Best Supporting Actress =

Annual Canadian film award

Québec Cinéma presents an annual award for Best Supporting Actress (French: Prix Iris de la meilleure interprétation féminin dans un rôle de soutien) to recognize the best in the Cinema of Quebec.

Until 2016, it was known as the Jutra Award for Best Supporting Actress in memory of influential Quebec film director Claude Jutra. Following the withdrawal of Jutra's name from the award, the 2016 award was presented under the name Québec Cinéma. The Prix Iris name was announced in October 2016.

Céline Bonnier received the most nominations in this category, seven, and received one award. Sandrine Bisson received five nominations, including four for her role in Ricardo Trogi's autobiographical tetralogy. She won for 1981, 1991 and 1995, becoming the only actress to win the award thrice. For her performance in Inch'Allah, Sabrina Ouazani became the first non-Canadian to win the award.

A rare tie occurred in this category during the 7th Jutra Awards between Sylvie Moreau and Brigitte Lafleur for their respective roles in Love and Magnets (Les aimants) and The Five of Us (Elles étaient cinq). Humanist Vampire Seeking Consenting Suicidal Person (Vampire humaniste cherche suicidaire consentant) became the third film to receive three acting nominations in the same category, following Les Boys III and A Colony (Une colonie).

Three actresses received nominations for Best Actress and Best Supporting Actress in the same year:

- In 2005, Céline Bonnier was nominated for Best Actress for Machine Gun Molly (Monica la mitraille) and Best Supporting Actress for The Last Tunnel (Le dernier tunnel).
- In 2007, Bonnier achieved the same feat again, winning Best Actress for Deliver Me (Délivrez-moi) while receiving a nomination for Best Supporting Actress for A Sunday in Kigali (Un dimanche à Kigali).
- In 2017, Emmanuelle Lussier-Martinez was nominated for Best Actress for Those Who Make Revolution Halfway Only Dig Their Own Graves (Ceux qui font les révolutions à moitié n'ont fait que se creuser un tombeau) and Best Supporting Actress for Bad Seeds (Les mauvaises herbes).
- In 2022, Hélène Florent became the first person to win both awards during the same ceremony: Best Actress for Drunken Birds (Les oiseaux ivres) and Best Supporting Actress for Maria Chapdelaine.

== 1990s ==
Year	Actress	Film	Ref
1999; 1st Jutra Awards
1999; 1st Jutra Awards	Anne-Marie Cadieux	Streetheart (Le cœur au poing)	
1999; 1st Jutra Awards	Micheline Lanctôt	Now or Never (Aujourd'hui ou jamais)	
1999; 1st Jutra Awards	Monique Mercure	The Red Violin (Le violon rouge)	
1999; 1st Jutra Awards	Sonia Vachon	It's Your Turn, Laura Cadieux (C't'à ton tour, Laura Cadieux)	

== 2000s ==
Year	Actress	Film	Ref
2000; 2nd Jutra Awards
2000; 2nd Jutra Awards	Pascale Bussières	Set Me Free (Emporte-moi)	
2000; 2nd Jutra Awards	Maude Guérin	Matroni and Me (Matroni et moi)	
2000; 2nd Jutra Awards	Louise Portal	The Big Snake of the World (Le grand Serpent du monde)	
2000; 2nd Jutra Awards	Linda Singer	The Last Breath (Le dernier souffle)	
2001; 3rd Jutra Awards
2001; 3rd Jutra Awards	Marie-Jo Thério	Full Blast	
2001; 3rd Jutra Awards	Guylaine Tremblay	Life After Love (La vie après l'amour)	
2001; 3rd Jutra Awards	Maude Guérin	Pandora's Beauty (La beauté de Pandore)	
2001; 3rd Jutra Awards	Sylvie Moreau	The Bottle (La bouteille)	
2002; 4th Jutra Awards
2002; 4th Jutra Awards	Sylvie Drapeau	February 15, 1839 (15 février 1839)	
2002; 4th Jutra Awards	France Castel	Ice Cream, Chocolate and Other Consolations (Crème glacée, chocolat et autres consolations)	
2002; 4th Jutra Awards	Pascale Desrochers	Soft Shell Man (Un crabe dans la tête)	
2002; 4th Jutra Awards	Pierrette Robitaille	Wedding Night (Nuit de noces)	
2003; 5th Jutra Awards
2003; 5th Jutra Awards	Isabelle Blais	Québec-Montréal	
2003; 5th Jutra Awards	Céline Bonnier	Séraphin: Heart of Stone (Séraphin: Un homme et son péché)	
2003; 5th Jutra Awards	Geneviève Bujold	Chaos and Desire (La turbulence des fluides)	
2003; 5th Jutra Awards	Patsy Gallant	Yellowknife	
2004; 6th Jutra Awards
2004; 6th Jutra Awards	Clémence DesRochers	Seducing Doctor Lewis (La grande séduction)	
2004; 6th Jutra Awards	Dorothée Berryman	The Barbarian Invasions (Les invasions barbares)	
2004; 6th Jutra Awards	Claudia Ferri	Mambo Italiano	
2004; 6th Jutra Awards	Guylaine Tremblay	8:17 p.m. Darling Street (20h17 rue Darling)	
2005; 7th Jutra Awards
2005; 7th Jutra Awards	Sylvie Moreau	Love and Magnets (Les aimants)	
2005; 7th Jutra Awards	Brigitte Lafleur	The Five of Us (Elles étaient cinq)	
2005; 7th Jutra Awards	Céline Bonnier	The Last Tunnel (Le dernier tunnel)	
2005; 7th Jutra Awards	Marie-France Marcotte	The Last Tunnel (Le dernier tunnel)	
2006; 8th Jutra Awards
2006; 8th Jutra Awards	Danielle Proulx	C.R.A.Z.Y.	
2006; 8th Jutra Awards	Anne-Marie Cadieux	Maman Last Call	
2006; 8th Jutra Awards	Diane Lavallée	The Rocket (Maurice Richard)	
2006; 8th Jutra Awards	Catherine Trudeau	The Outlander (Le survenant)	
2007; 9th Jutra Awards
2007; 9th Jutra Awards	Fanny Mallette	Cheech	
2007; 9th Jutra Awards	Céline Bonnier	A Sunday in Kigali (Un dimanche à Kigali)	
2007; 9th Jutra Awards	Anne Dorval	The Secret Life of Happy People (La vie secrète des gens heureux)	
2007; 9th Jutra Awards	Lucie Laurier	Bon Cop, Bad Cop	
2008; 10th Jutra Awards
2008; 10th Jutra Awards	Laurence Leboeuf	My Daughter, My Angel (Ma fille, mon ange)	
2008; 10th Jutra Awards	Suzanne Clément	Twilight (La brunante)	
2008; 10th Jutra Awards	Véronique Le Flaguais	Surviving My Mother (Comment survivre à sa mère)	
2008; 10th Jutra Awards	Julie Perreault	The 3 L'il Pigs (Les 3 p'tits cochons)	
2009; 11th Jutra Awards
2009; 11th Jutra Awards	Angèle Coutu	Borderline	
2009; 11th Jutra Awards	Céline Bonnier	Mommy Is at the Hairdresser's (Maman est chez le coiffeur)	
2009; 11th Jutra Awards	Danielle Proulx	The Deserter (Le Déserteur)	
2009; 11th Jutra Awards	Maxim Roy	Adam's Wall	

== 2010s ==
Year	Actress	Film	Ref
2010; 12th Jutra Awards
2010; 12th Jutra Awards	Sandrine Bisson	1981	
2010; 12th Jutra Awards	Hélène Bourgeois Leclerc	Je me souviens	
2010; 12th Jutra Awards	Bénédicte Décary	Through the Mist (Dédé, à travers les brumes)	
2010; 12th Jutra Awards	Fanny Mallette	The Master Key (Grande Ourse, la clé des possibles)	
2010; 12th Jutra Awards	Sonia Vachon	5150 Elm's Way (5150, rue des Ormes)	
2011; 13th Jutra Awards
2011; 13th Jutra Awards	Dorothée Berryman	The Comeback (Cabotins)	
2011; 13th Jutra Awards	Marie Brassard	Vital Signs (Les signes vitaux)	
2011; 13th Jutra Awards	Geneviève Chartrand	Aurelie Laflamme's Diary (Le journal d'Aurélie Laflamme)	
2011; 13th Jutra Awards	Isabelle Miquelon	The Last Escape (La dernière fugue)	
2011; 13th Jutra Awards	Danielle Proulx	Stay with Me (Reste avec moi)	
2012; 14th Jutra Awards
2012; 14th Jutra Awards	Sophie Nélisse	Monsieur Lazhar	
2012; 14th Jutra Awards	Sandrine Bisson	Fear of Water (La peur de l'eau)	
2012; 14th Jutra Awards	Anick Lemay	Thrill of the Hills (Frisson des collines)	
2012; 14th Jutra Awards	Louise Portal	The Happiness of Others (Le bonheur des autres)	
2012; 14th Jutra Awards	Sonia Vachon	A Sense of Humour (Le sens de l'humour)	
2013; 15th Jutra Awards
2013; 15th Jutra Awards	Sabrina Ouazani	Inch'Allah	
2013; 15th Jutra Awards	Nathalie Baye	Laurence Anyways	
2013; 15th Jutra Awards	Monia Chokri	Laurence Anyways	
2013; 15th Jutra Awards	Sophie Lorain	Before My Heart Falls (Avant que mon cœur bascule)	
2013; 15th Jutra Awards	Ève Ringuette	Mesnak	
2014; 16th Jutra Awards
2014; 16th Jutra Awards	Mélissa Désormeaux-Poulin	Gabrielle	
2014; 16th Jutra Awards	Marie Brassard	Vic and Flo Saw a Bear (Vic+Flo ont vu un ours)	
2014; 16th Jutra Awards	Sophie Desmarais	The Dismantling (Le démantèlement)	
2014; 16th Jutra Awards	Muriel Dutil	Riptide (Ressac)	
2014; 16th Jutra Awards	Frédérique Paré	Catimini	
2015; 17th Jutra Awards
2015; 17th Jutra Awards	Suzanne Clément	Mommy	
2015; 17th Jutra Awards	Dalal Ata	Arwad	
2015; 17th Jutra Awards	Sandrine Bisson	1987	
2015; 17th Jutra Awards	Evelyne Brochu	Tom at the Farm (Tom à la ferme)	
2015; 17th Jutra Awards	Catherine St-Laurent	You're Sleeping Nicole (Tu dors Nicole)	
2016; 18th Quebec Cinema Awards
2016; 18th Quebec Cinema Awards	Diane Lavallée	The Passion of Augustine (La passion d'Augustine)	
2016; 18th Quebec Cinema Awards	Christine Beaulieu	The Mirage (Le mirage)	
2016; 18th Quebec Cinema Awards	Schelby Jean-Baptiste	Scratch	
2016; 18th Quebec Cinema Awards	Catherine-Audrey Lachapelle	Love in the Time of Civil War (L'amour au temps de la guerre civile)	
2016; 18th Quebec Cinema Awards	Lysandre Ménard	The Passion of Augustine (La passion d'Augustine)	
2017; 19th Quebec Cinema Awards
2017; 19th Quebec Cinema Awards	Céline Bonnier	Kiss Me Like a Lover (Embrasse-moi comme tu m'aimes)	
2017; 19th Quebec Cinema Awards	Marion Cotillard	It's Only the End of the World (Juste la fin du monde)	
2017; 19th Quebec Cinema Awards	Emmanuelle Lussier-Martinez	Bad Seeds (Les mauvaises herbes)	
2017; 19th Quebec Cinema Awards	Léa Seydoux	It's Only the End of the World (Juste la fin du monde)	
2017; 19th Quebec Cinema Awards	Cynthia Wu-Maheux	On My Mother's Side (L'origine des espèces)	
2018; 20th Quebec Cinema Awards
2018; 20th Quebec Cinema Awards	Brigitte Poupart	Ravenous (Les affamés)	
2018; 20th Quebec Cinema Awards	Isabelle Blais	Tadoussac	
2018; 20th Quebec Cinema Awards	Sandra Dumaresq	Infiltration (Le problème d'infiltration)	
2018; 20th Quebec Cinema Awards	Micheline Lanctôt	Ravenous (Les affamés)	
2018; 20th Quebec Cinema Awards	Karine Vanasse	Worst Case, We Get Married (Et au pire, on se mariera)	
2019; 21st Quebec Cinema Awards
2019; 21st Quebec Cinema Awards	Sandrine Bisson	1991	
2019; 21st Quebec Cinema Awards	Céline Bonnier	For Those Who Don't Read Me (À tous ceux qui ne me lisent pas)	
2019; 21st Quebec Cinema Awards	Larissa Corriveau	Ghost Town Anthology (Répertoire des villes disparues)	
2019; 21st Quebec Cinema Awards	Mélissa Désormeaux-Poulin	The Far Shore (Dérive)	
2019; 21st Quebec Cinema Awards	Natalia Dontcheva	Sashinka	

== 2020s ==
Year	Actress	Film	Ref
2020; 22nd Quebec Cinema Awards
2020; 22nd Quebec Cinema Awards	Micheline Bernard	Matthias & Maxime	
2020; 22nd Quebec Cinema Awards	Juliette Gosselin	Fabulous (Fabuleuses)	
2020; 22nd Quebec Cinema Awards	Micheline Lanctôt	Laughter (Le rire)	
2020; 22nd Quebec Cinema Awards	Ève Landry	And the Birds Rained Down (Il pleuvait des oiseaux)	
2020; 22nd Quebec Cinema Awards	Geneviève Schmidt	Compulsive Liar (Menteur)	
2021; 23rd Quebec Cinema Awards
2021; 23rd Quebec Cinema Awards	Caroline Néron	Goddess of the Fireflies (La déesse des mouches à feu)	
2021; 23rd Quebec Cinema Awards	Sophie Desmarais	Vacarme	
2021; 23rd Quebec Cinema Awards	Marianne Farley	Our Own (Les nôtres)	
2021; 23rd Quebec Cinema Awards	Éléonore Loiselle	Goddess of the Fireflies (La déesse des mouches à feu)	
2021; 23rd Quebec Cinema Awards	Sigourney Weaver	My Salinger Year	
2022; 24th Quebec Cinema Awards
2022; 24th Quebec Cinema Awards	Hélène Florent	Maria Chapdelaine	
2022; 24th Quebec Cinema Awards	Joséphine Bacon	Bootlegger	
2022; 24th Quebec Cinema Awards	Christine Beaulieu	Norbourg	
2022; 24th Quebec Cinema Awards	Céline Bonnier	The Time Thief (L'arracheuse de temps)	
2022; 24th Quebec Cinema Awards	Marine Johnson	Drunken Birds (Les oiseaux ivres)	
2023; 25th Quebec Cinema Awards
2023; 25th Quebec Cinema Awards	Laurie Babin	Red Rooms (Les chambres rouges)	
2023; 25th Quebec Cinema Awards	Élise Guilbault	One Summer (Le temps d'un été)	
2023; 25th Quebec Cinema Awards	Ève Landry	Bungalow	
2023; 25th Quebec Cinema Awards	Julie Le Breton	You Will Remember Me (Tu te souviendras de moi)	
2023; 25th Quebec Cinema Awards	Nadia Tereszkiewicz	Babysitter	
2024; 26th Quebec Cinema Awards
2024; 26th Quebec Cinema Awards	Sandrine Bisson	1995	
2024; 26th Quebec Cinema Awards	Marie Brassard	Humanist Vampire Seeking Consenting Suicidal Person (Vampire humaniste cherche suicidaire consentant)	
2024; 26th Quebec Cinema Awards	Sophie Cadieux	Humanist Vampire Seeking Consenting Suicidal Person (Vampire humaniste cherche suicidaire consentant)	
2024; 26th Quebec Cinema Awards	Pascale Montpetit	Ababooned (Ababouiné)	
2024; 26th Quebec Cinema Awards	Noémie O'Farrell	Humanist Vampire Seeking Consenting Suicidal Person (Vampire humaniste cherche suicidaire consentant)	
2025; 27th Quebec Cinema Awards
2025; 27th Quebec Cinema Awards	Danielle Fichaud	Universal Language (Une langue universelle)	
2025; 27th Quebec Cinema Awards	Catherine Chabot	Compulsive Liar 2 (Menteuse)	
2025; 27th Quebec Cinema Awards	Sophie Desmarais	Who by Fire (Comme le feu)	
2025; 27th Quebec Cinema Awards	Chantal Fontaine	Vile & Miserable (Vil & Misérable)	
2025; 27th Quebec Cinema Awards	Juliette Gariépy	Two Women (Deux femmes en or)	

== Multiple wins and nominations ==
=== Multiple wins ===
Wins	Actress
3	Sandrine Bisson

=== Three or more nominations ===
Nominations	Actress
7	Céline Bonnier
5	Sandrine Bisson
3	Marie Brassard
3	Sophie Desmarais
3	Micheline Lanctôt
3	Danielle Proulx
3	Sonia Vachon

== Combined totals for Best Actress, Best Supporting Actress and Revelation of the Year ==
=== Multiple wins ===
Wins	Actress
3	Céline Bonnier
3	Sandrine Bisson
2	Émilie Bierre
2	Isabelle Blais
2	Pascale Bussières
2	Ariane Castellanos
2	Marie-Josée Croze
2	Kelly Depeault
2	Anne Dorval
2	Hélène Florent
2	Élise Guilbault
2	Karine Vanasse

=== Three or more nominations ===
Nominations	Actress
12	Céline Bonnier
6	Suzanne Clément
6	Guylaine Tremblay
5	Sandrine Bisson
5	Élise Guilbault
5	Fanny Mallette
4	Isabelle Blais
4	Pascale Bussières
4	Sophie Desmarais
4	Mélissa Désormeaux-Poulin
4	Anne Dorval
4	Maude Guérin
4	Micheline Lanctôt
4	Laurence Leboeuf
4	Danielle Proulx
4	Ginette Reno
4	Karine Vanasse
3	Émilie Bierre
3	Marie Brassard
3	Hélène Florent
3	Julie Le Breton
3	Sara Montpetit
3	Louise Portal
3	Pierrette Robitaille
3	Sonia Vachon

== See also ==
- Canadian Screen Award for Best Supporting Actress
