= 1995 (film) =

- Directed by: Ricardo Trogi
- Written by: Ricardo Trogi
- Produced by: Marie-Claude Poulin
- Starring: Jean-Carl Boucher; Sandrine Bisson; Francis-William Rhéaume
- Cinematography: Steve Asselin
- Edited by: Yvann Thibaudeau
- Music by: Frédéric Bégin
- Production company: Sphere Media
- Distributed by: Immina Films
- Release date: July 31, 2024
- Country: Canada
- Language: French

1995 is a 2024 Canadian comedy film written and directed by Ricardo Trogi. The fourth film in his semi-autobiographical series after 1981, 1987 and 1991, the film stars Jean-Carl Boucher as Trogi, making his first foray into filmmaking as a contestant in the competition series La Course destination monde in 1995.

The cast also includes Sandrine Bisson, Francis-William Rhéaume, Rose Adam, Shadi Janho, Guillaume Gauthier, Claudio Colangelo, Olivier Aubin, Mickaël Gouin, Myriam Gaboury, Maude Bouchard, Marie-Josée Bastien and David Leblanc.

The film was released on July 31, 2024, by Immina Films.

== Production ==
The film's development was first announced in 2021. Filming began on October 10, 2023, and took place in Montreal, Quebec City, Morocco and Nepal.

Trogi stated that he considers the film to be the funniest in the series; he noted as well that while La Course was retitled in the film for copyright reasons, he kept the real names of key personalities who featured in the storyline, including host Pierre Therrien and judges Michel Coulombe, Louise Racicot and Manon Barbeau.

He has also stated that while there may be future films in the series, he is not currently certain of that, stating in particular that he doesn't see any comedy to be mined from his experiences directing his debut film Québec-Montréal. He subsequently raised the possibility of following up with 1998, which would centre on his early work in directing television advertisements, or backing up to 1956, which would tell the story of his father's immigration to Canada from his native Italy, but has not confirmed that he will definitely make either film.

== Release ==
The film's first promotional poster was revealed in February 2024, and the film opened theatrically on July 31.

The film surpassed the $1 million benchmark for box office success in the Quebec market within ten days of its release, and would cross $2 million within 20 days. As his seventh film to surpass the $1 million benchmark, it also gave Trogi a new record for the most films by a Canadian director ever to achieve this in Quebec. 1995 has grossed over $2.9 million.

It was screened in a gala presentation at the 2024 Cinéfest Sudbury International Film Festival.

== Accolades ==
Award / Film Festival	Date of ceremony	Category	Recipient(s)	Result	Ref.
Prix Iris	December 8, 2024	Best Film	Marie-Claude Poulin	Nominated	
Prix Iris	December 8, 2024	Best Director	Ricardo Trogi	Nominated	
Prix Iris	December 8, 2024	Best Actor	Jean-Carl Boucher	Nominated	
Prix Iris	December 8, 2024	Best Supporting Actress	Sandrine Bisson	Won	
Prix Iris	December 8, 2024	Revelation of the Year	Shadi Janho	Nominated	
Prix Iris	December 8, 2024	Best Screenplay	Ricardo Trogi	Nominated	
Prix Iris	December 8, 2024	Best Cinematography	Steve Asselin	Nominated	
Prix Iris	December 8, 2024	Best Editing	Yvann Thibaudeau	Nominated	
Prix Iris	December 8, 2024	Best Visual Effects	Marie-Claude Lafontaine, Sébastien Chartier	Nominated	
Prix Iris	December 8, 2024	Best Casting	Karel Quinn	Nominated	
Prix Iris	December 8, 2024	Prix Michel-Côté	Patrick Roy, Marie-Claude Poulin, Ricardo Trogi	Nominated	
