= Patrice Vermette =

Canadian art director (born 1970)

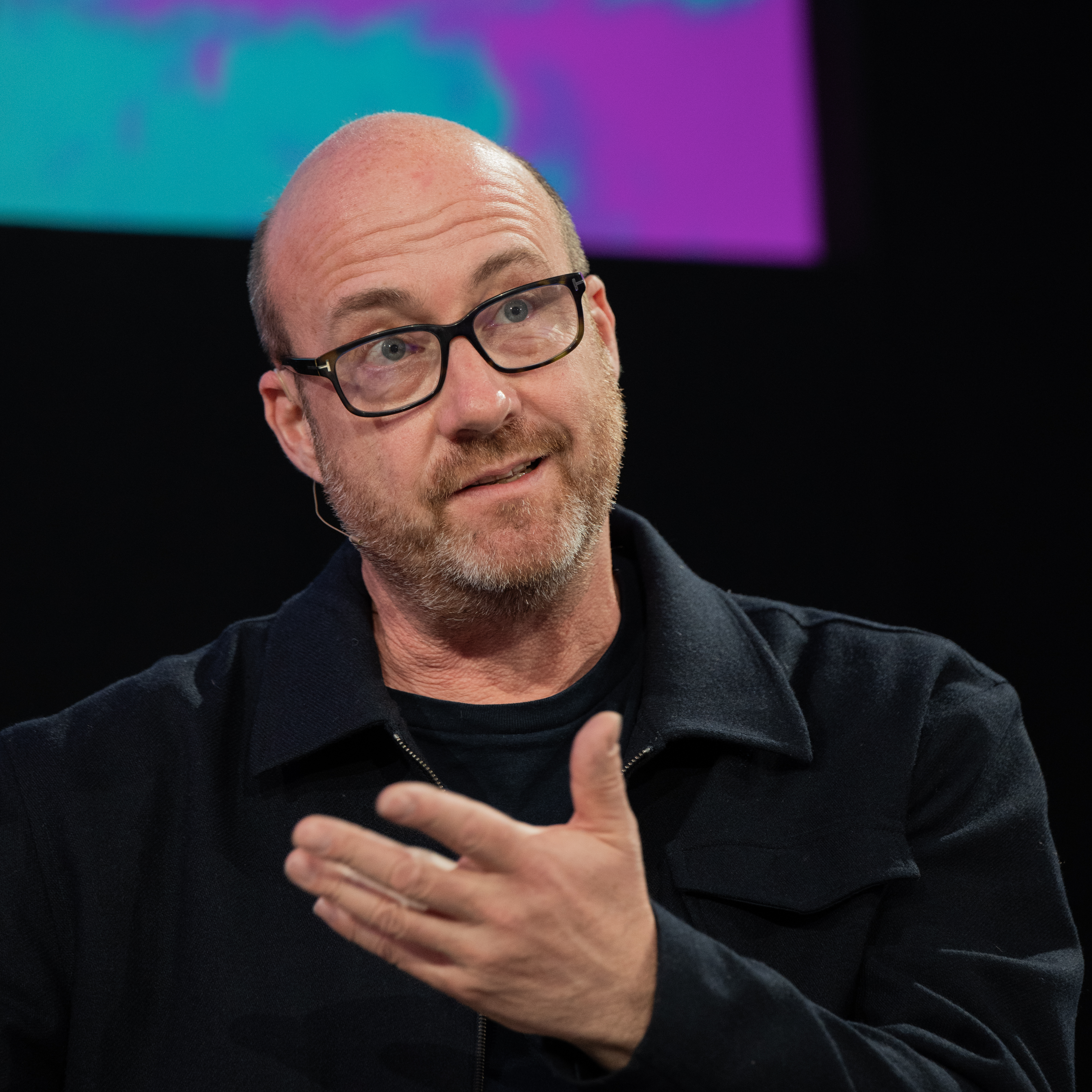
- At SXSW London, June 2026
- Born: 1970 (age 55–56); Montreal, Canada
- Years active: 1996–recent

Patrice Vermette (born 1970) is a Canadian production designer/art director. He is most noted for his work on the films C.R.A.Z.Y., for which he won both the Genie Award for Best Art Direction/Production Design at the 26th Genie Awards and the Jutra Award for Best Art Direction at the 8th Jutra Awards, and Dune, for which he won the Academy Award for Best Production Design at the 94th Academy Awards.

He was also a Jutra winner for Café de Flore at the 14th Jutra Awards and for 1987 at the 17th Jutra Awards, and was nominated at the 13th Jutra Awards for City of Shadows (La Cité) and at the 17th Jutra Awards for Enemy. He was a Genie and Canadian Screen Award nominee at the 30th Genie Awards for 1981, at the 32nd Genie Awards for Café de Flore and at the 2nd Canadian Screen Awards for Enemy, and an Academy Award nominee at the 82nd Academy Awards for The Young Victoria and at the 89th Academy Awards for Arrival.

His other credits include the short film Magical Words (Les Mots magiques).

== Early life and education ==
Patrice Vermette was born in Montreal, Quebec. He studied communications at Concordia University, specializing in sound. In 1977, at the age of seven, he watched the first film in the Star Wars series, a moment he said sparked his desire to dedicate his life to helping tell stories like the one he had seen. Vermette has also stated that as a music enthusiast, his "dream" was to produce albums.

After graduating university, Vermette was involved in the visual design of music videos. He also worked in advertising.

== Filmography ==
Year	Title	Director
2001	Hidden Agenda	Marc S. Grenier
2005	C.R.A.Z.Y.	Jean-Marc Vallée
2009	1981	Ricardo Trogi
2009	The Young Victoria	Jean-Marc Vallée
2010	City of Shadows	Kim Nguyen
2011	Café de Flore	Jean-Marc Vallée
2012	La Banda Picasso	Fernando Colomo
2013	Prisoners	Denis Villeneuve
2013	Enemy	Denis Villeneuve
2014	1987	Ricardo Trogi
2015	Sicario	Denis Villeneuve
2016	Arrival	Denis Villeneuve
2017	The Mountain Between Us	Hany Abu-Assad
2018	Gringo	Nash Edgerton
2018	Vice	Adam McKay
2021	Dune	Denis Villeneuve
2023	Foe	Garth Davis
2024	Dune: Part Two	Denis Villeneuve
2026	Dune: Part Three	Denis Villeneuve
