= Prix Iris for Best Actor =

Annual Canadian film award

Québec Cinéma presents an annual award for Best Actor (French: Prix Iris de la meilleure interprétation dans un premier rôle masculin) to recognize the best in the Cinema of Quebec.

Until 2016, it was known as the Jutra Award for Best Actor in memory of influential Quebec film director Claude Jutra. Following the withdrawal of Jutra's name from the award, the 2016 award was presented under the name Québec Cinéma. The Prix Iris name was announced in October 2016.

Luc Picard received the most nominations in this category, six, and received one award. Gilbert Sicotte received three nominations and won everytime, becoming the actor with the most wins in this category. Paul Ahmarani and Olivier Gourmet jointly received the award for Congorama, making Ahmarani the first actor to win the award twice and Gourmet the first non-Canadian to win the award.

Natar Ungalaaq became the first indigenous actor to win the award for his performance in The Necessities of Life (Ce qu'il faut pour vivre). Les Boys III is the only film to receive three nominations in this category. Three actors were nominated multiple times for playing the same character: Marc Messier for Les Boys II and Les Boys III, Patrick Huard for Bon Cop, Bad Cop and Bon Cop, Bad Cop 2 and Jean-Carl Boucher for 1981, 1987, 1991 and 1995.

Seven actors received nominations for Best Actor and Best Supporting Actor or Revelation of the Year in the same year:

- In 2002, Luc Picard won Best Actor for February 15, 1839 (15 février 1839) and was nominated for Best Supporting Actor for The Woman Who Drinks (La femme qui boit).
- In 2008, Guillaume Lemay-Thivierge was nominated for Best Actor for Nitro and Best Supporting Actor for The 3 L'il Pigs (Les 3 p'tits cochons).
- In 2012, Mario Saint-Amand was nominated for Best Actor for Gerry and Best Supporting Actor for Coteau rouge.
- In 2020, Robin Aubert was nominated for Best Actor for Young Juliette (Jeune Juliette) and Best Supporting Actor for Thanks for Everything (Merci pour tout).
- In 2023, Steve Laplante won Best Actor for Viking and was nominated for Best Supporting Actor for Babysitter.
- In 2024, Marc-André Grondin was nominated for Best Actor for The Successor (Le successeur) and won Best Supporting Actor for Richelieu.
- Also in 2024, Félix-Antoine Bénard received dual nominations for Best Actor and Revelation of the Year for his role in Humanist Vampire Seeking Consenting Suicidal Person (Vampire humaniste cherche suicidaire consentant).

== 1990s ==
Year	Actor	Film	Ref
1999; 1st Jutra Awards
1999; 1st Jutra Awards	Alexis Martin	August 32nd on Earth (Un 32 août sur terre)	
1999; 1st Jutra Awards	Marc Messier	Les Boys II	
1999; 1st Jutra Awards	Marcel Sabourin	Now or Never (Aujourd'hui ou jamais)	
1999; 1st Jutra Awards	Dino Tavarone	2 Seconds (2 secondes)	

== 2000s ==
Year	Actor	Film	Ref
2000; 2nd Jutra Awards
2000; 2nd Jutra Awards	Gabriel Arcand	Post Mortem	
2000; 2nd Jutra Awards	Sébastien Huberdeau	Sable Island (L'île de sable)	
2000; 2nd Jutra Awards	Pierre Lebeau	Matroni and Me (Matroni et moi)	
2000; 2nd Jutra Awards	Luc Picard	The Last Breath (Le dernier souffle)	
2001; 3rd Jutra Awards
2001; 3rd Jutra Awards	Paul Ahmarani	The Left-Hand Side of the Fridge (La moitié gauche du frigo)	
2001; 3rd Jutra Awards	François Papineau	The Bottle (La bouteille)	
2001; 3rd Jutra Awards	David La Haye	Full Blast	
2001; 3rd Jutra Awards	Michel Côté	Life After Love (La vie après l'amour)	
2002; 4th Jutra Awards
2002; 4th Jutra Awards	Luc Picard	February 15, 1839 (15 février 1839)	
2002; 4th Jutra Awards	Rémy Girard	Les Boys III	
2002; 4th Jutra Awards	Patrick Huard	Les Boys III	
2002; 4th Jutra Awards	David La Haye	Soft Shell Man (Un crabe dans la tête)	
2002; 4th Jutra Awards	Marc Messier	Les Boys III	
2002; 4th Jutra Awards	Zinedine Soualem	Tar Angel (L'ange de goudron)	
2003; 5th Jutra Awards
2003; 5th Jutra Awards	Pierre Lebeau	Séraphin: Heart of Stone (Séraphin: Un homme et son péché)	
2003; 5th Jutra Awards	Paul Ahmarani	The Marsh (Le Marais)	
2003; 5th Jutra Awards	Roy Dupuis	Séraphin: Heart of Stone (Séraphin: Un homme et son péché)	
2003; 5th Jutra Awards	Patrice Robitaille	Québec-Montréal	
2004; 6th Jutra Awards
2004; 6th Jutra Awards	Serge Thériault	Gaz Bar Blues	
2004; 6th Jutra Awards	Raymond Bouchard	Seducing Doctor Lewis (La grande Séduction)	
2004; 6th Jutra Awards	Rémy Girard	The Barbarian Invasions (Les invasions barbares)	
2004; 6th Jutra Awards	Luc Picard	8:17 p.m. Darling Street (20h17 rue Darling)	
2005; 7th Jutra Awards
2005; 7th Jutra Awards	Roy Dupuis	Looking for Alexander (Mémoires affectives)	
2005; 7th Jutra Awards	Michel Côté	The Last Tunnel (Le dernier tunnel)	
2005; 7th Jutra Awards	Guy Jodoin	Dans une galaxie près de chez vous	
2005; 7th Jutra Awards	David La Haye	Battle of the Brave (Nouvelle-France)	
2006; 8th Jutra Awards
2006; 8th Jutra Awards	Marc-André Grondin	C.R.A.Z.Y.	
2006; 8th Jutra Awards	Patrick Drolet	The Novena (La neuvaine)	
2006; 8th Jutra Awards	Roy Dupuis	The Rocket (Maurice Richard)	
2006; 8th Jutra Awards	Luc Picard	Audition (L'audition)	
2007; 9th Jutra Awards
2007; 9th Jutra Awards	Paul Ahmarani	Congorama	
2007; 9th Jutra Awards	Olivier Gourmet	Congorama	
2007; 9th Jutra Awards	Marc Béland	The Little Book of Revenge (Guide de la petit vengeance)	
2007; 9th Jutra Awards	Colm Feore	Bon Cop, Bad Cop	
2007; 9th Jutra Awards	Patrick Huard	Bon Cop, Bad Cop	
2007; 9th Jutra Awards	Luc Picard	A Sunday in Kigali (Un dimanche à Kigali)	
2008; 10th Jutra Awards
2008; 10th Jutra Awards	Roy Dupuis	Shake Hands with the Devil	
2008; 10th Jutra Awards	Marc Labrèche	Days of Darkness (L'âge des ténèbres)	
2008; 10th Jutra Awards	Claude Legault	The 3 L'il Pigs (Les 3 p'tits cochons)	
2008; 10th Jutra Awards	Guillaume Lemay-Thivierge	Nitro	
2009; 11th Jutra Awards
2009; 11th Jutra Awards	Natar Ungalaaq	The Necessities of Life (Ce qu'il faut pour vivre)	
2009; 11th Jutra Awards	Michel Côté	Cruising Bar 2	
2009; 11th Jutra Awards	Alexis Martin	Le Banquet	
2009; 11th Jutra Awards	Vincent-Guillaume Otis	Babine	

== 2010s ==
Year	Actor	Film	Ref
2010; 12th Jutra Awards
2010; 12th Jutra Awards	Sébastien Ricard	Through the Mist (Dédé, à travers les brumes)	
2010; 12th Jutra Awards	Jean-Carl Boucher	1981	
2010; 12th Jutra Awards	Michel Côté	Father and Guns (De père en flic)	
2010; 12th Jutra Awards	Normand D'Amour	5150 Elm's Way (5150, rue des Ormes)	
2010; 12th Jutra Awards	Xavier Dolan	I Killed My Mother (J'ai tué ma mère)	
2011; 13th Jutra Awards
2011; 13th Jutra Awards	Claude Legault	10½	
2011; 13th Jutra Awards	Jay Baruchel	The Trotsky	
2011; 13th Jutra Awards	Emmanuel Bilodeau	Curling	
2011; 13th Jutra Awards	Jacques Godin	The Last Escape (La dernière fugue)	
2011; 13th Jutra Awards	François Papineau	Route 132	
2012; 14th Jutra Awards
2012; 14th Jutra Awards	Gilbert Sicotte	The Salesman (Le vendeur)	
2012; 14th Jutra Awards	Mohamed Fellag	Monsieur Lazhar	
2012; 14th Jutra Awards	Patrick Huard	Starbuck	
2012; 14th Jutra Awards	Charles Antoine Perreault	A Life Begins (Une vie qui commence)	
2012; 14th Jutra Awards	Mario Saint-Amand	Gerry	
2013; 15th Jutra Awards
2013; 15th Jutra Awards	Julien Poulin	Camion	
2013; 15th Jutra Awards	Ali Ammar	Romeo Eleven (Roméo Onze)	
2013; 15th Jutra Awards	Gabriel Arcand	Karakara	
2013; 15th Jutra Awards	Marc-André Grondin	L'Affaire Dumont	
2013; 15th Jutra Awards	Victor Andrés Trelles Turgeon	The Torrent (Le torrent)	
2014; 16th Jutra Awards
2014; 16th Jutra Awards	Antoine Bertrand	Louis Cyr (Louis Cyr: L'homme le plus fort du monde)	
2014; 16th Jutra Awards	Gabriel Arcand	The Dismantling (Le démantèlement)	
2014; 16th Jutra Awards	Alexandre Landry	Gabrielle	
2014; 16th Jutra Awards	Marcel Sabourin	Another House (L'autre maison)	
2014; 16th Jutra Awards	Isaka Sawadogo	Diego Star	
2015; 17th Jutra Awards
2015; 17th Jutra Awards	Antoine Olivier Pilon	Mommy	
2015; 17th Jutra Awards	Walter Borden	Gerontophilia	
2015; 17th Jutra Awards	Jean-Carl Boucher	1987	
2015; 17th Jutra Awards	Guy Nadon	Guardian Angel (L'ange gardien)	
2015; 17th Jutra Awards	Patrice Robitaille	The Little Queen (La petite reine)	
2016; 18th Quebec Cinema Awards
2016; 18th Quebec Cinema Awards	Gilbert Sicotte	Paul à Québec	
2016; 18th Quebec Cinema Awards	Xavier Dolan	Elephant Song	
2016; 18th Quebec Cinema Awards	Maxim Gaudette	Our Loved Ones (Les êtres chers)	
2016; 18th Quebec Cinema Awards	Alexandre Landry	Love in the Time of Civil War (L'amour au temps de la guerre civile)	
2016; 18th Quebec Cinema Awards	Paul Savoie	The Diary of an Old Man (Le journal d'un vieil homme)	
2017; 19th Quebec Cinema Awards
2017; 19th Quebec Cinema Awards	Gabriel Arcand	A Kid (Le fils de Jean)	
2017; 19th Quebec Cinema Awards	Dane DeHaan	Two Lovers and a Bear	
2017; 19th Quebec Cinema Awards	Antoine Olivier Pilon	1:54	
2017; 19th Quebec Cinema Awards	Émile Schneider	Where Atilla Passes (Là où Attila passe)	
2017; 19th Quebec Cinema Awards	Gaspard Ulliel	It's Only the End of the World (Juste la fin du monde)	
2018; 20th Quebec Cinema Awards
2018; 20th Quebec Cinema Awards	Christian Bégin	Infiltration (Le problème d'infiltration)	
2018; 20th Quebec Cinema Awards	Jesse Camacho	We're Still Together	
2018; 20th Quebec Cinema Awards	Patrick Huard	Bon Cop, Bad Cop 2	
2018; 20th Quebec Cinema Awards	Joey Klein	We're Still Together	
2018; 20th Quebec Cinema Awards	Jean-Simon Leduc	Family First (Chien de garde)	
2019; 21st Quebec Cinema Awards
2019; 21st Quebec Cinema Awards	Martin Dubreuil	For Those Who Don't Read Me (À tous ceux qui ne me lisent pas)	
2019; 21st Quebec Cinema Awards	Jean-Carl Boucher	1991	
2019; 21st Quebec Cinema Awards	Pierre-Luc Brillant	The Fireflies Are Gone (La disparition des lucioles)	
2019; 21st Quebec Cinema Awards	Patrick Hivon	We Are Gold (Nous sommes Gold)	
2019; 21st Quebec Cinema Awards	Théodore Pellerin	Genesis (Genèse)	

== 2020s ==
Year	Actor	Film	Ref
2020; 22nd Quebec Cinema Awards
2020; 22nd Quebec Cinema Awards	Gilbert Sicotte	And the Birds Rained Down (Il pleuvait des oiseaux)	
2020; 22nd Quebec Cinema Awards	Robin Aubert	Young Juliette (Jeune Juliette)	
2020; 22nd Quebec Cinema Awards	Marc-André Grondin	Mafia Inc.	
2020; 22nd Quebec Cinema Awards	Patrick Hivon	A Brother's Love (La femme de mon frère)	
2020; 22nd Quebec Cinema Awards	Niels Schneider	Sympathy for the Devil (Sympathie pour le diable)	
2021; 23rd Quebec Cinema Awards
2021; 23rd Quebec Cinema Awards	Sébastien Ricard	The Vinland Club (Le club Vinland)	
2021; 23rd Quebec Cinema Awards	Réal Bossé	The Decline (Jusqu'au déclin)	
2021; 23rd Quebec Cinema Awards	Paul Doucet	Our Own (Les nôtres)	
2021; 23rd Quebec Cinema Awards	Patrick Hivon	Mont Foster	
2021; 23rd Quebec Cinema Awards	Antoine Olivier Pilon	Target Number One	
2022; 24th Quebec Cinema Awards
2022; 24th Quebec Cinema Awards	Vincent-Guillaume Otis	Norbourg	
2022; 24th Quebec Cinema Awards	Sylvain Marcel	Aline	
2022; 24th Quebec Cinema Awards	Robert Naylor	The Noise of Engines (Le bruit des moteurs)	
2022; 24th Quebec Cinema Awards	Patrice Robitaille	A Revision (Une révision)	
2022; 24th Quebec Cinema Awards	Nguyen Thanh Tri	The Greatest Country in the World (Le meilleur pays du monde)	
2023; 25th Quebec Cinema Awards
2023; 25th Quebec Cinema Awards	Steve Laplante	Viking	
2023; 25th Quebec Cinema Awards	Guillaume Cyr	Family Game (Arseneault et fils)	
2023; 25th Quebec Cinema Awards	Patrick Hivon	Babysitter	
2023; 25th Quebec Cinema Awards	Henri Picard	The Dishwasher (Le Plongeur)	
2023; 25th Quebec Cinema Awards	Luc Picard	Confessions of a Hitman (Confessions)	
2024; 26th Quebec Cinema Awards
2024; 26th Quebec Cinema Awards	Théodore Pellerin	Solo	
2024; 26th Quebec Cinema Awards	Félix-Antoine Bénard	Humanist Vampire Seeking Consenting Suicidal Person (Vampire humaniste cherche suicidaire consentant)	
2024; 26th Quebec Cinema Awards	Jean-Carl Boucher	1995	
2024; 26th Quebec Cinema Awards	Pierre-Yves Cardinal	The Nature of Love (Simple comme Sylvain)	
2024; 26th Quebec Cinema Awards	Marc-André Grondin	The Successor (Le Successeur)	
2025; 27th Quebec Cinema Awards
2025; 27th Quebec Cinema Awards	Patrick Hivon	Peak Everything (Amour apocalypse)	
2025; 27th Quebec Cinema Awards	Paul Ahmarani	Who by Fire (Comme le feu)	
2025; 27th Quebec Cinema Awards	Antoine Bertrand	Miss Boots (Mlle Bottine)	
2025; 27th Quebec Cinema Awards	Félix-Antoine Duval	Shepherds (Bergers)	
2025; 27th Quebec Cinema Awards	Gildor Roy	Blue Sky Jo (La petite et le vieux)	

== Multiple wins and nominations ==
=== Multiple wins ===
Wins	Actor
3	Gilbert Sicotte
2	Paul Ahmarani
2	Gabriel Arcand
2	Roy Dupuis
2	Sébastien Ricard

=== Three or more nominations ===
Nominations	Actor
6	Luc Picard
5	Patrick Hivon
4	Paul Ahmarani
4	Gabriel Arcand
4	Jean-Carl Boucher
4	Michel Côté
4	Roy Dupuis
4	Marc-André Grondin
4	Patrick Huard
3	David La Haye
3	Antoine Olivier Pilon
3	Patrice Robitaille
3	Gilbert Sicotte

== Combined totals for Best Actor, Best Supporting Actor and Revelation of the Year ==
=== Multiple wins ===
Wins	Actor
3	Gabriel Arcand
3	Théodore Pellerin
3	Luc Picard
3	Gilbert Sicotte
2	Paul Ahmarani
2	Roy Dupuis
2	Marc-André Grondin
2	Jean Lapointe
2	Claude Legault
2	Julien Poulin
2	Sébastien Ricard

=== Three or more nominations ===
Nominations	Actor
10	Luc Picard
7	Rémy Girard
6	Gabriel Arcand
6	Patrick Hivon
5	Michel Côté
5	Martin Dubreuil
5	Marc-André Grondin
5	Patrick Huard
5	Alexis Martin
4	Paul Ahmarani
4	Robin Aubert
4	Emmanuel Bilodeau
4	Jean-Carl Boucher
4	Guillaume Cyr
4	Roy Dupuis
4	Steve Laplante
4	Pierre Lebeau
4	Vincent-Guillaume Otis
4	François Papineau
4	Théodore Pellerin
3	Antoine Bertrand
3	Normand D'Amour
3	David La Haye
3	Claude Legault
3	Antoine Olivier Pilon
3	Julien Poulin
3	Gilles Renaud
3	Sébastien Ricard
3	Patrice Robitaille
3	Gilbert Sicotte

== See also ==
- Canadian Screen Award for Best Actor
