= The Guide to the Perfect Family =

- Film poster
- French: Le Guide de la famille parfaite
- Directed by: Ricardo Trogi
- Written by: François Avard; Jean-François Léger; Louis Morissette
- Produced by: Louis-Philippe Drolet; Félize Frappier
- Starring: Louis Morissette; Catherine Chabot; Émilie Bierre; Isabelle Guérard
- Cinematography: Geneviève Perron
- Edited by: Yvann Thibaudeau
- Music by: Frédéric Bégin
- Production company: KO24
- Distributed by: Les Films Opale; Netflix
- Release date: July 14, 2021
- Running time: 102 minutes
- Country: Canada
- Language: French

The Guide to the Perfect Family (French: Le Guide de la famille parfaite) is a 2021 Canadian comedy-drama film directed by Ricardo Trogi. The film stars Louis Morissette and Catherine Chabot as Martin Dubois and Marie-Soleil Blouin, a married couple with a tendency toward helicopter parenting. This creates problems for Rose (Émilie Bierre), Louis's 16-year-old daughter from his prior marriage to Caroline (Isabelle Guérard).

The film premiered theatrically in Quebec on July 14, 2021. It was acquired by Netflix for international distribution.

In its year-end review of Canadian film and television in 2021, the trade magazine Playback ranked it as the Film of the Year.

== Plot ==
Middle-aged father Martin Dubois hires the young Pier-Luc solely due to him being the son of a colleague. This new employee is unwilling to put in any effort to complete a contract: "I don't work under pressure." He is driven by a desire to achieve, but he hates being given a heavy workload and he is unwilling to accept any repercussions from his superior. Martin loses a significant promotion after losing a major contract under Pier-Luc's responsibility.

After school, Rose Dubois is constantly reminded by her father Martin not to forget her dance and hockey practices, as well as her tutoring sessions. He repeatedly tells her that her future success rides on doing well in Grade 11 because, if not, she might end up getting a low-paying job in the future such as a cashier at a convenience store. The pressure Rose feels leads her to use and trade drugs for past exam papers in order to satisfy her father's demands for academic success.

As her final exams approach, Martin suggests that he and Rose spend the weekend visiting her grandparents. They find themselves in the woods near a lake, where he hopes to reconnect with his daughter. During an activity that starts off well, a conflict erupts, giving Rose the opportunity to express that she never feels she lives up to him aspirations. Upon their return to the city, she goes to live with her mother, Caroline.

During a mother-daughter evening, Rose returns alone to their apartment. After accessing her final exams online, sad about the results and desperate, she drinks a bottle of wine and takes a lot of pills she finds in a cupboard. The next morning, Caroline finds her daughter lying unconscious on the bathroom floor.

Caroline contacts an ambulance to rush her to the hospital. She calls Martin, who hurries to meet them there. Rose pulls through. Afterwards, both she and Martin apologize to each other and she goes back home with him.

A short time later, father and daughter and little brother Mathis go to a park for ice cream. The boy goes to play on the swings, tripping and falling on his face on his way. Martin motions to help him, but Rose insists he stay back so the boy can learn.

== Cast ==
- Louis Morissette as Martin Dubois
- Emilie Bierre as Rose Dubois
- Catherine Chabot as Marie-Soleil Blouin
- Xavier Lebel as Mathis Dubois
- Isabelle Guérard as Caroline
- Gilles Renaud as Robert Dubois
- Alexandre Goyette as Stéphane Dubois
- Jean-Carl Boucher as Pierre-Luc Roy
- Louise Portal as Monique Dubois
