= 1981 (2009 film) =

- French release poster
- Directed by: Ricardo Trogi
- Written by: Ricardo Trogi
- Produced by: Nicole Robert
- Starring: Jean-Carl Boucher
- Narrated by: Ricardo Trogi
- Cinematography: Steve Asselin
- Edited by: Yvann Thibaudeau
- Music by: Frédéric Bégin
- Production company: Go Films
- Distributed by: Alliance Vivafilm
- Release date: September 4, 2009
- Running time: 102 minutes
- Country: Canada
- Language: French
- Budget: CA$$4.6 million (US$4.5 million)

1981, longer title 1981: L'année où je suis devenu un menteur (1981: The Year I Became a Liar), is a 2009 Canadian-French language comedy-drama film from Quebec written and directed by Ricardo Trogi. It was released on September 4, 2009. The film is autobiographical about the youth years of the director as told by him during the film.

The film was the first in what is, as of 2024, a tetralogy of semi-autobigraphical films about Trogi's life, followed by 1987, 1991 and 1995.

== Synopsis ==
In 1981, 11-year-old Ricardo (Jean-Carl Boucher) and his family arrive in their new home. Having no friends, Ricardo spends his time in a magazine and asks his parents for money. During school, his teacher notices his bad calligraphy and assigns him to Anne Tremblay (Elizabeth Adam) to improve his writing; he falls immediately in love with the classmate. The family faces trouble when the father loses his job and the sister's cat, Caramel, goes missing.

At school, Ricardo tries to gain a reputation after discovering a Walkman to win Anne's love. He then befriends the "Red K-Ways" after lying by promising to give Playboy magazines. During an important school event, Ricardo gives a poor presentation about an important item; Anne presents a marble that her deceased cousin gave her. To get closer to her, Ricardo steals her gift.

After the K-Ways suspect his many lies, Ricardo tries to buy a Walkman to gain an honest reputation. He encounters his father doing music in a local restaurant. He and his mother argue about money, and his mother tells him to find a job to pay for the things he wants. He then delivers newspapers. Later, at home, his father tells Ricardo they have to sell the house.

In the woods, a member of the K-Ways has a meltdown when his father goes to jail; they then reveal they all lied about different topics, and they reconcile. Before leaving, Ricardo decides to go to Anne's home and tell the truth. He learns that Anne never had a deceased cousin and that the marble was only decorative. Back at home, the family finds Caramel with babies as they depart.

== Cast ==
- Jean-Carl Boucher as Ricardo Trogi
- Sandrine Bisson as Claudette Trogi, Ricardo's mother
- Claudio Colangelo as Benito Trogi, Ricardo's father
- Gabriel Maillé as Jérôme, the leader of the "K-Way rouges"
- Dany Bouchard as Marchand, member of the "K-Way rouges"
- Léo Caron as Plante, member of the "K-Way rouges"
- Marjolaine Lemieux as teacher Aline
- Élizabeth Adam as Anne Tremblay, the beautiful student Ricardo falls in love with
- Lauriane Fortier as Anne Tremblay's friend
- Pierre-Xavier Martel as the Nazi
- Rose Adam as Nadia Trogi, Ricardo's sister
- Simone Chevalot as secretary at the school
- Pierre Mailloux as Mr. Dagenais
- Jean-Robert Bourdage as Maître Schneider
- Mikahel Turcot-Beauchemin
- Ricardo Trogi as Narrator

== Awards ==
| Award | Date of ceremony | Category | Recipient(s) | Result | Ref(s) |
|---|---|---|---|---|---|
| Genie Awards | 2010 | Best Actor | Jean-Carl Boucher | Nominated | |
| Genie Awards | 2010 | Best Art Direction/Production Design | Patrice Vermette | Nominated | |
| Genie Awards | 2010 | Best Costume Design | Anne-Karine Gauthier | Nominated | |
| Genie Awards | 2010 | Best Makeup | Micheline Trépanier, Linda Gordon | Nominated | |
| Jutra Awards | 2010 | Best Film | Nicole Robert | Nominated | |
| Jutra Awards | 2010 | Best Director | Ricardo Trogi | Nominated | |
| Jutra Awards | 2010 | Best Actor | Jean-Carl Boucher | Nominated | |
| Jutra Awards | 2010 | Best Supporting Actress | Sandrine Bisson | Won | |
| Jutra Awards | 2010 | Best Hairstyling | Linda Gordon | Won | |
