= Saving Me (TV series) =

Animated sci-fi sitcom

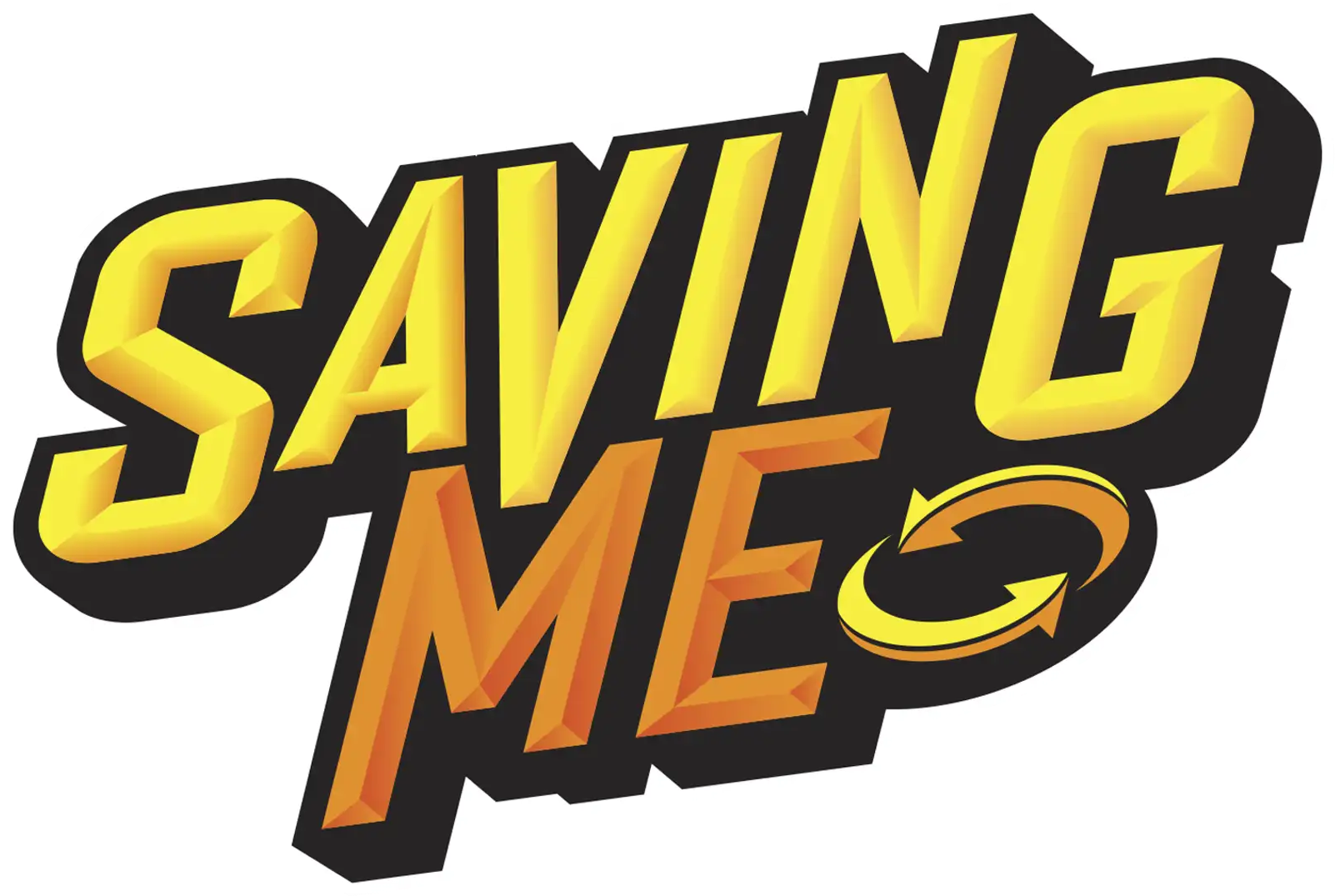
- Genre: Animated sitcom; Science fiction; Slice of life
- Created by: Aaron Johnston
- Voices of: Ivan Sherry; Adam Sanders; Jonathan Tan; Amariah Faulkner; Ana Sani; Dan Chameroy; Cory Doran; Jamie Watson
- Composer: Daniel Scott
- Countries of origin: United States; Canada
- Original language: English
- No. of seasons: 2
- No. of episodes: 20

Production
- Executive producers: Andra Johnson Duke; Michael A. Dunn; Jeff Simpson; Luke Johnson; Aaron Johnston; Kelly Loosli; Roddy McManus; Jacques Bilodeau; Bruno Dubé; Marlo Miazga; David Reckziegel
- Producers: Shanna Thomson; Lesley Saliwonchyk
- Running time: 20-22 minutes
- Production companies: Sphere Media; BYUtv

Original release
- Network: BYUtv (United States); Family Channel (Canada); BRAVE+ (United States)
- Release: October 1, 2022 – present

Saving Me is an animated science fiction sitcom created by Aaron Johnston for BYUtv. The show follows the time-traveling adventures of a grouchy senior billionaire named Bennett Bramble. Lonely and hated in his own era, Bennett travels back in time to meet his 11-year-old self and to convince the boy to make better decisions about his life. He tries to teach ethics to his younger counterpart, but he has little actual understanding of the topic, causing his advice and his plans to constantly backfire.

The show is the first animated series to be created for BYUtv. It is produced by Sphere Animation (formerly known as Oasis Animation), a Montreal-based animation studio that is known for its work on the last six seasons of Arthur, the Netflix animated series Kulipari, and Riley Rocket, among others.

The show premiered on BYUtv on October 1, 2022, and on Family Channel on March 15, 2023. The show originally ended on April 3, 2023 with two seasons and 20 episodes in total. The show has been renewed for a third and fourth season, making a total of 40 episodes for this show.

== Overview ==
In the distant future , 61-year-old Bennett Bramble lives in Star City, Toronto, where he is widely disliked and struggles with loneliness. After numerous unsuccessful attempts to improve his public image, Bennett becomes convinced that his reputation can no longer be changed in the present. Seeking an alternative solution, he constructs time machine that allows him to travel into the past as and enter the mind of his younger 11-year-old self.

After doing so, he meets Young Bennett, his younger self from five decades ago. Bennett wants to teach himself the correct choices to make, and he also hopes to repair his grim future. The only problem is that Bennett has forgotten how to be good, so teaching his younger self how to do so causes many bizarre (and often nonsensical) things to happen.

== Characters ==
- Old Bennett Bramble (voiced by Ivan Sherry) - The main protagonist. A grumpy billionaire and technology entrepreneu who discovers that he is widely disliked in the future. Determined to change his reputation, he travels back in time, where he encounters his 11-year-old self. Old Bennett attempts to guide his younger counterpart towards becoming a better person, unaware that his own behaviour and personality have remained largely unchanged over the decades.
- Young Bennett Bramble (voiced by Adam Sanders) - Old Bennett's younger, pre-teen self. Unlike his future self, he's more friendly and intelligent. After confronting Old Bennett, he agrees to team up with him so that he can learn how to become a better person, and build up relationships with his family.
- Mark Bramble (voiced by Dan Chameroy) - Young Bennett's father. He and his son are the only people in the family with glasses. He works at the secret agency but as a ruse tells his children that he works at a shampoo factory.
- Carla Bramble (voiced by Ana Sani) - Young Bennett's mother. She and her husband work at the secret agency and she goes on missions in a cybernetic battle suit which conceals her true identity.
- Liam Bramble (voiced by Jonathan Tan) - Young Bennett's older brother. He has a device on his chest and has an online streaming channel. He and Bennett have a strained relationship which improves significantly over time.
- Sophie Bramble (voiced by Amariah Faulkner) - Young Bennett's younger sister. She has pink-colored hair, and as such she is the only family member to have her hair dyed. Like Liam, she too has a strained relationship with Bennett but she looks up to him and wishes to be closer to him. Their relationship also improves over time.
- Edee 34 (voiced by Cory Doran) - Old Bennett's robot assistant and his only friend in the future who often tries to prevent him from making rash decisions. In the past, he has acted as the Bramble family's personal robot. He is not to be confused with the first and second generation models built by Young Bennett that don't speak and do very little house work.
- Commander Crumb (voiced by Jamie Watson) - Mark and Carla's boss at the secret agent plant.
- Penelope Snodgrass (voiced by Stacey DePass) - Young Bennett's friend and former class rival. She has the brains to invent a lot of items but intends to use them to promote her self rather than help the community. She later becomes Bennett's love interest.
- Flip Nealy (voiced by Jeffrey Knight) - The head local news reporter.

== Development ==
Saving Me was created by Aaron Johnston. Daniel Scott composed the soundtrack for the show. Production of the series began in January 2021. In August 2022, BYUtv announced that they had greenlit the show for two 10-episode seasons, the first of which was slated to premiere at the beginning of October 2022.

The first season was officially released online at byutv.org and on the BYUtv App on October 1, 2022. A 2-part sneak peek was also shown on BYUtv in-between sessions of the Church of Jesus Christ of Latter-day Saints October General Conference. The series then moved to Monday nights and aired its entire season after the 10th Anniversary episodes of Studio C. On October 27, 2022, it was confirmed that WildBrain had signed on as a global distributor for the series.

The second season was officially released in its entirety on byutv.org on March 5, 2023, before premiering the following day on the network.

On June 17, 2024, Animation Magazine reported that BYUtv had renewed Saving Me for a third and fourth season, each consisting of 10 episodes, with production scheduled for completion in June 2026.

== Episodes ==
Season	Episodes	Originally released	
Season	Episodes	First released	Last released
1	10	October 1, 2022	December 5, 2022
2	10	March 6, 2023	April 3, 2023
3	10	TBA	TBA

=== Season 1 (2022) ===
No. overall	No. in season	Title	Directed by	Written by	Original release date
1	1	"Super Mega Sophie Kapow!"	Greg Bailey	Aaron Johnston	October 1, 2022 (BYUtv & byutv.org)
Young Bennett Bramble ignores his sister when she says she's scared of the ghosts in her closet. Shortly thereafter, he gets a visit from his 61-year-old self who has invented time-travel through the mind. He's there to help Bennett become a better person so he won't be alone in the future, but when he motivates Young Bennett to build a fear-free helmet out of Sophie's bicycle helmet, he ends up turning her into a stunt woman who wants to be a superhero.
2	2	"Moose Ninja Vanish!"	Greg Bailey	Aaron Johnston	October 1, 2022 (BYUtv & byutv.org)
When Young Bennett and his older brother Liam get into a feud over a vlog sponsorship, Old Bennett convinces Young Bennett to create a Moose Ninja as a form of truce that will help smooth things over. When Moose Ninja tries to drink bottled water though, it shorts him out, causing him to go on a rampage.
3	3	"Man's Best Friend's Enemy"	Greg Bailey	Aaron Johnston	October 1, 2022 (byutv.org); October 17, 2022 (BYUtv)
Old Bennett tries to convince his younger self to not get a pet after Penelope's father changes their apartment's animal code to allow her to get a pet cat, but Old Bennett worries how his younger self will take things if his new pet runs away. Realizing what his older self is worried about, Young Bennett decides to create some smart earmuffs which will allow his dog to become smart, but when Edee's holovideo mob battle plays instead, it creates the Mob Dog, turning Duke from Man's Best Friend to Man's Worst Nightmare.
4	4	"Snowmageddon"	Greg Bailey	Sam Ruano	October 1, 2022 (byutv.org); October 24, 2022 (BYUtv)
When Young Bennett hogs all of the questions at the Star City Quiz Bowl and never lets his friends have a turn, the Quizzards decide to kick him out of the group. To try to win back their friendship, he decides to build a robot named Mr. Sorry that will appease each of them, but when Mr. Sorry steals all the Climate Controls and decides to create a Snowmageddon, the Quizzards must figure out how to stop him and save their former member.
5	5	"The Shampoo Sham"	Greg Bailey	Dave Dias	October 1, 2022 (byutv.org); October 31, 2022 (BYUtv)
When Young Bennett exaggerates on what his father does as a chemist, he is slated to receive a failing grade unless he goes out and spends the day with his dad at work. Seeing no other choice, Mark accepts, leading his undercover agency to take over the local shampoo factory for one day. However, when a secret compound Mark is supposed to be studying gets mixed in with some shampoo, it starts to turn all the undercover agents into sasquatch monsters, forcing Bennett and his dad to come up with a new chemical to reverse the cause. Meanwhile, Carla agrees to let Liam and Sophie stay home for the day under one condition- they learn through self life lessons what true work is.
6	6	"Engineer Club"	Greg Bailey	Paul Stoica	October 1, 2022 (byutv.org); November 7, 2022 (BYUtv)
Young Bennett wants to attend his Engineer Club, but an argument with his sister makes doing so a hard time unless he can first learn to get along. In order to help him do so, Old Bennett invents a device that will cause the mind to change all negative responses into positive ones, but when a group of convicts escapes and goes undercover at the Engineer Club, asking for a laser and promising a monetary reward, Young Bennett and Sophie decide they should dive in full throttle without worrying about any consequences that may occur.
7	7	"The Shoes Make the Man"	Greg Bailey	Miles Smith	October 1, 2022 (byutv.org); November 14, 2022 (BYUtv)
Young Bennett is forced to play sports by his school, but his only choices left are the dangerous sport of Boot Ball or ping pong. Old Bennett warns him not to join ping pong because his dad's a ping pong champion that'll never let him rest, so Bennett joins Boot Ball thinking that he'll never have to play. After five of his teammates get hurt, however, Bennett is forced to play and he learns his mom was a boot ball champion. Not wanting to let anyone down, Young Bennett decides to reprogram his boots to win at any cost, but they go haywire and refuse to listen to any command other than win at all costs. Now Young Bennett must find a way to fix his predicament before it's too late.
8	8	"Mind Trip"	Greg Bailey	Sam Ruano	October 1, 2022 (byutv.org); November 21, 2022 (BYUtv)
Mother's Day has arrived, and once again Young Bennett has forgotten to do something for her because he doesn't remember everything she did for him. To remedy the situation, Old Bennett creates an entry to the brain's inner sanctum where they can see everything she did for them, but when Carla accidentally awakes Young Bennett, Old Bennett gets trapped inside his younger self's brain, meaning that if Young Bennett can't find a way back, his older self could be destroyed. To make matters worse, he still needs to figure out what he's going to do for his mom for Mother's Day.
9	9	"Genius at Work"	Greg Bailey	Dave Dias	October 1, 2022 (byutv.org); November 28, 2022 (BYUtv)
Young Bennett decides that he must fix the AC when it goes haywire at his house, but in the process, he gets caught by the cops and Mr. Snodgrass, the latter of whom realizes that Bennett appears to have a genius IQ and decides to offer him an internship, but Old Man Bennett is worried because he realizes that it is a year before it was supposed to take place, and he must figure out the best way to teach Young Bennett how to spend time with his family while balancing an internship.
10	10	"Rebel with a Cause"	Greg Bailey	Aaron Johnston	October 1, 2022 (byutv.org); December 5, 2022 (BYUtv)
Young Bennett decides to join a club to find out who the mystery soldier that continually saves the city is, unaware that he's not the only one interested. Reginald Snodgrass commissions a giant robot that will strike fear into the city and reveal the identity of the mystery soldier- Count Dentist. When Old Man Bennett refuses to answer his younger self, Young Bennett decides to become a rebel and starts acting out in school, but when he accidentally joins the local crime syndicate, the mystery soldier is forced to do battle with the local syndicate and with the Count Dentist. In the end, Count Dentist is able to dissolve the soldier's suit, revealing its identity as Carla, but she gets away safely without anyone realizing that it is her. Shortly after, Young Bennett finds the secret entrance and must decide what to do.

=== Season 2 (2023) ===
No. overall	No. in season	Title	Directed by	Written by	Original release date
11	1	"Grounded"	Greg Bailey	Miles Smith	March 5, 2023 (byutv.org); March 6, 2023 (BYUtv)
Young Bennett has been suspended, in spite of the fact that he has found the secret entrance to where his parents work. Seeing no choice, Commander Crumb decides to have Nira's mom watch Bennett while the group figures out how to make the secret soldier fights look like part of a publicity stunt. A problem to being grounded though is that Bennett can't get the parts to rebuild Edee. Old Bennett decides to help him build a device in which he and Nira will swap minds, but when the device begins to short out, Bennett must do everything he can to get home so he and her don't lose their minds forever.
12	2	"Anger Mismanagement"	Greg Bailey	Amanda Joy	March 5, 2023 (byutv.org); March 6, 2023 (BYUtv)
Sophie is a big fan of fictional artist Trill and likes to pretend she can play her instrument. During a Trill concert, Young Bennett loses his temper and he ends up breaking Sophie's instrument. Old Bennett comes to the rescue and helps Young Bennett make a replacement that can even play Trill sounds and calming music. However, the two soon discover that Trill is actually an evil musician who seeks to control all of Earth with brainwashing music. The only thing that can beat her is calm music, but unless Young Bennett can overcome his temper there'll be no way to stop her when she hypnotizes his entire family.
13	3	"The Candidate"	Greg Bailey	Ian MacIntyre	March 5, 2023 (byutv.org); March 13, 2023 (BYUtv)
When the lone mayoral candidate, Maureen Dullvers, announces she plans to extend the school day, Young Bennett decides to create an AI candidate to oppose her (because he needs more time to invent items). However, when the Bennetts' AI, Abraham Trutherman, takes over the web and declares he must run the entire world, it's up to the guys to convince him that not all humans tell lies and there are individuals that can be trusted.
14	4	"Fishzilla"	Greg Bailey	Miles Smith	March 5, 2023 (byutv.org); March 13, 2023 (BYUtv)
Bennett and Liam decide to place a wager on who will catch the bigger fish at their first ever Father/Son fishing trip, but when an alien seahorse gets loose in the water and gets enlarged by the former's fish enlarger, the group must put aside their rivalry and figure out how to save everyone without being eaten.
15	5	"Clash of the Horns"	Greg Bailey	Dave Dias	March 5, 2023 (byutv.org); March 20, 2023 (BYUtv)
Sophie reveals that a Unicorn Commando film competition is about to take place, and the winners will get cameos in the upcoming Unicorn Commandos 8 film. Young Bennett is determined to win, but when he reads Sophie's script, he fears that it goes against UCCU (Unicorn Commando Cinematic Universe) lore too much. He decides to become the film's director and correct everything he feels is wrong with Sophie's film, but when Sophie realizes what he's done, it just might break her heart. Meanwhile, the parents find their work facility under inspection, but when Young Bennett's special effects create a galactic scare, it could very well end up costing them all their jobs if they don't do everything by the book.
16	6	"The Emplifier"	Greg Bailey	Ian MacIntyre	March 5, 2023 (byutv.org); March 20, 2023 (BYUtv)
When Old Bennett realizes he has no empathy, he returns to the past and helps his younger self create a device that can read emotions. His ultimate goal is to develop empathy when Liam gets heartbroken by a girl named Jessica who he's afraid doesn't see him. However, when the machine short circuits, it begins making the city infatuated with Liam. At the same time, Ambassador Cogentor visits the Bramble parents job to learn if Earth is a good place to leave their planet's technology, but their entire species specializes in not showing emotions.
17	7	"Disabler Enabler"	Greg Bailey	Miles Smith	March 5, 2023 (byutv.org); March 27, 2023 (BYUtv)
When the entire family becomes obsessed with devices, Carla decides they need an intervention and paces the entire family on a device free lockdown for the entire week. Young Bennett decides to invent a bracelet that will knock out any device he gets near for a 10 hour period unless it gets destroyed. Unexpected consequences arise though when it knocks out the power to the Undercover Base, the school, and Mama Robber soon learns of it and decides to use Bennett to break her son out of prison. Now it's up to Carla and a returning Duke to find a way to rescue Bennett from the robbers and keep the city safe from a massive power failure.
18	8	"The Not-So Fun Fundraiser"	Greg Bailey	Ian MacIntyre	March 5, 2023 (byutv.org); March 27, 2023 (BYUtv)
In an attempt to stop himself from being greedy, Old Bennett once again travels to the past to prevent his younger self from becoming a billionaire from a wild-scheme fundraiser. However, his entire future is altered when Young Bennett becomes a chocolate connoisseur and changes his future self from being a scientist to the new Willy Wonka. It also changes Edee from being an assistant robot to being a singing Oompa Loompa robot. Now Old Man Bennett must find a way to get the future back on track and prevent himself from owning the world's largest chocolate empire.
19	9	"Bennett The Grouch"	Greg Bailey	Miles Smith	March 5, 2023 (byutv.org); April 3, 2023 (BYUtv)
Young Bennett is having problems sleeping while Mark is having problems staying awake. To resolve both problems, Bennett invents a sleeping helmet that allows him to accomplish needed takes in his sleep. When his dad takes him to the secret base and unleashes a dangerous specimen from the vault, however, it creates a time conundrum which may unite enemies in Bennett and Penelope while also revealing the existence of the vault to the public.
20	10	"The Vault"	Greg Bailey	Aaron Johnston	March 5, 2023 (byutv.org); April 3, 2023 (BYUtv)
After Young Bennett discovers his parents' secret elevator, he learns he must protect it from Reginald Snodgrass to keep the world from falling into chaos. Elsewhere, his older self must avoid future Penelope as new laws preventing all time travel, including that within his own mind, come into effect. Meanwhile, a work trip for Carla goes awry when the newest members of the Galactic Alliance decide they want everything in the vault moved to their own planet so they can use its technology to protect their world and destroy all the worlds of their enemies.

=== Season 3 (2026) ===
No. overall	No. in season	Title	Directed by	Written by	Original release date
21	1	"Piping Hot Mind-Wiping Donuts Now!"	TBA	TBA	TBA
After eating the pie Sophie made for a bake sale, Bennett surprises her with a pie making machine. But when strange things begin to happen at the bake sale, Bennett must act fast to fix his mistake and make it up to Sophie.
22	2	"The New Guy"	TBA	TBA	TBA
Young Bennett starts his first day at a new job, eager to prove himself. But Mark and Carla are determined to keep him distracted while they work on a mysterious new project.
23	3	"#stuntfail"	TBA	TBA	TBA
Embarrassed to talk about his new job, Young Bennett invents a cover story: he’s a student at a stunt school. Unconvinced, the students at his school challenge him to prove it.
24	4	"A Day to Remember"	TBA	TBA	TBA
When a family waterpark trip is canceled and Sophie’s pet turtle dies, Young Bennett does everything he can to get their plans back on track.

== Reception ==
On IMDb, Saving Me holds a rating of 8.9/10. It is also receiving favorable reviews among fanboards, including one that calls it a clean version of Rick and Morty that the entire family can enjoy.

== See also ==
- Hailey's On It!
- Time Squad
