= Fear of Water =

Fear of Water may refer to:

- Aquaphobia, a psychological condition,
- Fear of Water (2011 film), also known as La peur de l'eau, a 2011 thriller film by Gabriel Pelletier,
- Fear of Water (2014 film), a 2014 drama film by Kate Lane.
