= Sphere Media =

Television production company

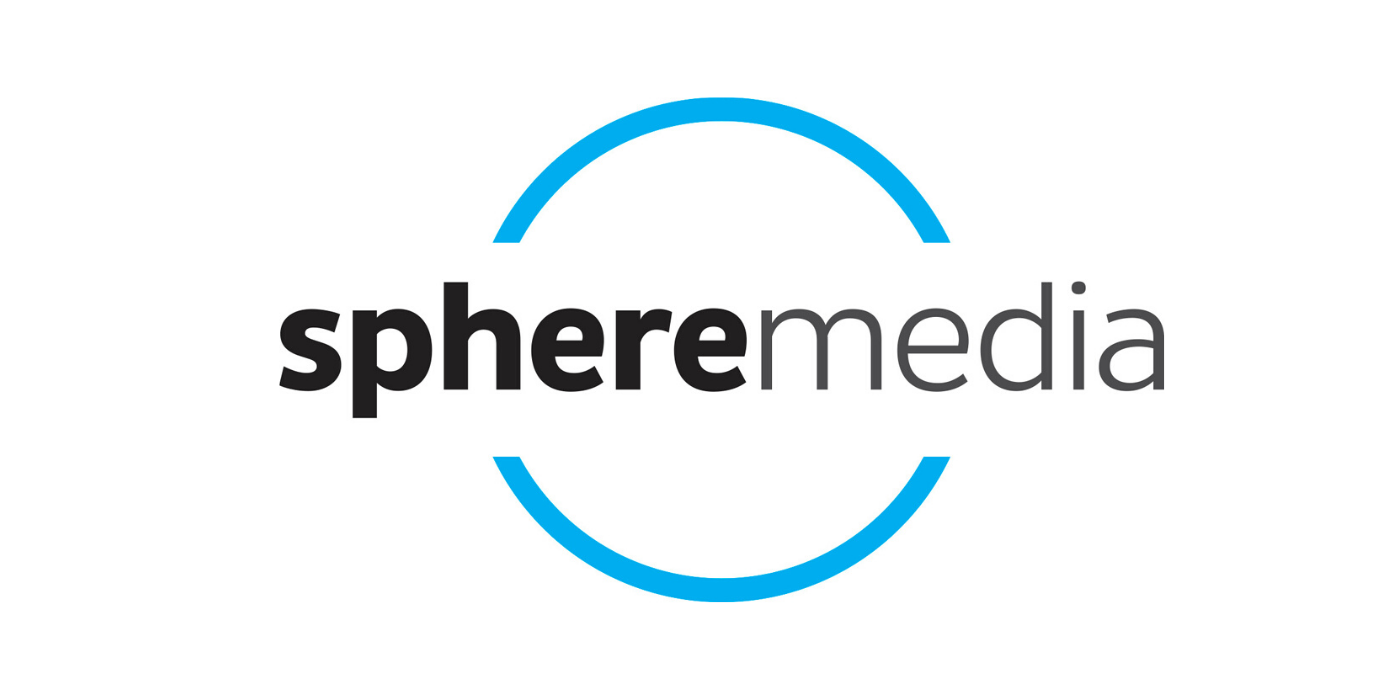
- Formerly: Groupe Télé-Vision (1984–2010); DATSIT Studios (2012–2017); DATSIT Sphere (2017–2020)
- Type: Private
- Industry: Television production
- Founded: 1984; 42 years ago in Montreal, Quebec, Canada
- Founder: Jean Rémillard
- Headquarters: Montreal, Quebec, Canada
- Key people: Bruno Dubé (CEO)
- Divisions: Sphere Abacus; Sphere Animation; Sphere Films
- Website: sphere-media.com/en/

Sphere Media is a Canadian film and television production and distribution company based in Montreal, Quebec.

== History ==
Sphere Media was founded in 1984 by Jean Rémillard. Initially named Groupe Télé-Vision Inc., the company was sold in 2010 to Bruno Dubé and partners, and renamed DATSIT Studios, in 2012. It was renamed DATSIT Sphere in 2017 after acquiring Sphere Media Plus, founded by Jocelyn Deschênes.

The company subsequently acquired other smaller studios, including Nicole Robert's Go Films in 2018, Oasis Animation and Quiet Motion in 2019, Bristow Global Media in 2020, and Sienna Films in 2020.

In June 2020, DATSIT Sphere announced its rebranding as Sphere Media. Later the same year, the president of Sphere Media, Bruno Dubé, was named "Dealmaker of the Year" by Playback magazine for the acquisitions of BGM and Sienna Films during 2020.

In January 2022, Sphere Media announced the acquisition Montreal-based animation studio Sardine Productions, founded in 2002 by Ghislain Cyr. In the same year, it launched a new animation studio in Ottawa.

In April 2022, Sphere Media announced a corporate restructuring, rebranding its subsidiaries as Sphere Media, Sphere Films and Sphere Animation. They subsequently acquired Montreal-based film production and distribution company MK2 Mile End.

In March 2023, Bell Media acquired a minority stake in Sphere Media.

The Sardine Productions operations were subsequently incorporated into a new children's and family programming division launched in 2023.

In June 2024, Sphere Media announced a deal to acquire British-based premium television international distribution and rights management company Abacus Media Rights from its Toronto-based parent company Amcomri Entertainment for $18 million, renaming it Sphere Abacus. On March 26, 2025, Bell Media acquired a majority stake in Sphere Abacus, and announced that it would handle international distribution for its catalogue going forward.

== Key people ==
Bruno Dubé serves as the CEO of Sphere Media, overseeing its extensive operations and strategic direction.

Jennifer Kawaja serves as the president of scripted and feature films for English Canada, and film producer Marie-Claude Poulin joined the company in 2021 as head of French-language film development.

In February 2022, Kim Bondi joined Sphere Media-owned BGM as the senior vice-president of development.

== Productions ==
=== Television ===
- 2 frères - 1998-2000
- Le Monde de Charlotte - 2000-2004
- Rumeurs - 2002-2008
- Annie et ses hommes - 2002-2009
- Cover Girl - 2005
- Un monde à part - 2004-2005
- Providence - 2004-2011
- Vice caché - 2005-2006
- One Dead Indian - 2006
- Rumours - 2006-2007
- Les Hauts et les bas de Sophie Paquin - 2006-2009
- Sophie - 2008-2009
- Diamonds - 2009
- Mirador - 2009-2011
- Penthouse 5-0 - 2010-2011
- Mauvais karma - 2010-2012
- Toute la vérité - 2010-2014
- Combat Hospital - 2011
- 19-2 (French version) - 2011-2015
- Titanic - 2012
- Mémoires vives - 2013-2017
- Nouvelle adresse - 2014-2015
- 19-2 (English version) - 2014-2017
- This Life - 2015
- L'Imposteur - 2016-2017
- Trop - 2016-2019
- Ransom - 2017
- Bad Blood - 2017-2018
- Cardinal - 2017-2020
- Hubert et Fanny - 2018
- Une autre histoire - 2019-2022
- Les Honorables - 2019-2022
- Cerebrum - 2019-2024
- Trickster - 2020
- Épidémie - 2020
- Transplant - 2020-2024
- Sort Of - 2021-2023
- The Porter - 2022
- Aller simple - 2022–2023
- Saving Me - 2022-present
- Red Ketchup - 2023
- Riley Rocket - 2023-present
- How to Fail as a Popstar - 2023
- Vestiaires - 2024
- IXE-13 - 2024
- The Sticky - 2024
- Wayward - 2025

=== Film ===
- Erotica: A Journey Into Female Sexuality - 1997
- New Waterford Girl - 1999
- Karmina 2 - 2001
- Alias Betty (Betty Fisher et autres histoires) - 2001
- Québec-Montréal - 2002
- Evil Words (Sur le seuil) - 2003
- Love and Magnets (Les aimants) - 2004
- Touch of Pink - 2004
- I, Claudia - 2004
- Dodging the Clock (Horloge biologique) - 2005
- Cheech - 2006
- How She Move - 2007
- The Roberge Case (Le cas Roberge) - 2008
- Everything Is Fine (Tout est parfait) - 2008
- 1981 - 2009
- 7 Days - 2010
- Face Time (Le baiser du barbu) - 2010
- Fear of Water (La peur de l'eau) - 2011
- L'Affaire Dumont - 2012
- 1987 - 2014
- N.O.I.R - 2015
- Anna - 2015
- King Dave - 2016
- Nelly - 2016
- 1991 - 2018
- Fabulous (Fabuleuses) - 2019
- Sympathy for the Devil (Sympathie pour le diable) - 2019
- Sweetness in the Belly - 2019
- Happy Place - 2020
- Flashwood - 2020
- One of Ours - 2021
- White Dog (Chien blanc) - 2022
- The Dishwasher (Le Plongeur) - 2023
- 1995 - 2024
