= Fabulous (film) =

2019 film

- French: Fabuleuses
- Directed by: Mélanie Charbonneau
- Written by: Mélanie Charbonneau; Geneviève Pettersen
- Produced by: Nicole Robert
- Starring: Noémie O'Farrell; Juliette Gosselin; Mounia Zahzam
- Cinematography: Ariel Méthot-Bellemare
- Edited by: Isabelle Malenfant
- Music by: David Rancourt; Antoine Rochette
- Production company: Go Films
- Distributed by: Téléfiction
- Release date: August 21, 2019
- Running time: 112 minutes
- Country: Canada
- Language: French

Fabulous (French: Fabuleuses) is a Canadian comedy-drama film, directed by Mélanie Charbonneau and released in 2019. The film centres on Laurie (Noémie O'Farrell), Clara (Juliette Gosselin) and Élisabeth (Mounia Zahzam), three young female friends who document the ups and downs of their lives on social media.

The characters originated in Les Stagiares, a web series Charbonneau created in the mid-2010s. Charbonneau cowrote the screenplay with novelist Geneviève Pettersen.

== Accolades ==
The film won the Busan Bank Award at the 24th Busan International Film Festival.

The film received five Prix Iris nominations at the 22nd Quebec Cinema Awards, including for Best Film.

Award	Date of ceremony	Category	Recipient(s) and nominee(s)	Result	Ref(s)
Busan International Film Festival	3–12 October 2019	Busan Bank Award		Won	
Canadian Cinema Editors	2 October 2020	Best Editing in a Feature Film	Isabelle Malenfant	Nominated	
Prix Iris	10 June 2020	Best Film	Nicole Robert	Nominated	
Prix Iris	10 June 2020	Best Actress	Noémie O'Farrell	Nominated	
Prix Iris	10 June 2020	Best Supporting Actress	Juliette Gosselin	Nominated	
Prix Iris	10 June 2020	Best Makeup	Léonie Lévesque-Robert	Nominated	
Prix Iris	10 June 2020	Best Hairstyling	Daniel Jacob	Nominated	
