= Noir (film) =

- Film poster
- Directed by: Yves Christian Fournier
- Written by: Jean-Hervé Désiré; Yves Christian Fournier
- Produced by: Nicole Robert
- Starring: Salim Kechiouche; Benz Antoine; Julie Djiezion
- Cinematography: Jessica Lee Gagné
- Edited by: Mathieu Bouchard-Malo
- Music by: Patrick Lavoie
- Production company: Go Films
- Distributed by: Les Films Séville
- Release date: April 10, 2015
- Running time: 110 minutes
- Country: Canada
- Language: French

Noir is a 2015 Canadian drama film directed by Yves Christian Fournier.

An ensemble cast film set primarily in the impoverished Montreal North area, the film focuses on a variety of interconnected storylines. Characters include Dickens (Kémy St-Eloi) and Bobby (Clauter Alexandre), two Haitian Canadian brothers involved in the gang lifestyle; Kadhafi (Salim Kechiouche), an Algerian immigrant who works in a dry cleaning shop with Jean-Jacques (Benz Antoine) and dreams of becoming a hip hop star; and Suzie (Jade-Mariuka Robitaille), a stripper in a relationship with drug dealer Evans (Christopher Charles) while simultaneously connected in an ambiguous way to Phil (Patrick Hivon).

Kechiouche garnered a Jutra Award nomination for Best Supporting Actor at the 18th Jutra Awards.
