= L'Affaire Dumont =

2012 film

- Directed by: Daniel Grou
- Written by: Danielle Dansereau
- Produced by: Nicole Robert
- Starring: Marc-André Grondin; Geneviève Brouillette; Marilyn Castonguay
- Cinematography: Bernard Couture
- Edited by: Valérie Héroux
- Production company: Go Films
- Distributed by: Alliance Vivafilm; Seville Pictures
- Release date: September 13, 2012 (FCVQ)
- Running time: 121 minutes
- Country: Canada
- Language: French
- Budget: $4.9 million

L'Affaire Dumont is a Canadian drama film, released in 2012. Written by Danielle Dansereau based on a true story and directed by Daniel "Podz" Grou, the film stars Marc-André Grondin as Michel Dumont, a divorced young father of two who is accused of a sexual assault he did not commit.

The film's cast also includes Geneviève Brouillette, Patrick Hivon, Marilyn Castonguay, Emmanuel Schwartz, Guy Thauvette and Cynthia Wu-Maheux.

== Accolades ==
Award	Date of ceremony	Category	Recipient(s)	Result	Ref(s)
Canadian Screen Awards	March 3, 2013	Best Motion Picture	Nicole Robert	Nominated	
Canadian Screen Awards	March 3, 2013	Best Actor	Marc-André Grondin	Nominated	
Canadian Screen Awards	March 3, 2013	Best Actress	Marilyn Castonguay	Nominated	
Canadian Screen Awards	March 3, 2013	Best Art Direction and Production Design	André Guimond	Nominated	
Canadian Screen Awards	March 3, 2013	Best Editing	Valérie Héroux	Nominated	
Canadian Screen Awards	March 3, 2013	Best Sound Editing	Pierre-Jules Audet, Michelle Cloutier, Thierry Bourgault D'Amico, Nathalie Fleurant, Cédrick Marin	Nominated	
Canadian Screen Awards	March 3, 2013	Best Makeup	Marlène Rouleau, André Duval	Nominated	
Jutra Awards	March 17, 2013	Best Director	Daniel Grou	Nominated	
Jutra Awards	March 17, 2013	Best Actor	Marc-André Grondin	Nominated	
Jutra Awards	March 17, 2013	Best Actress	Marilyn Castonguay	Nominated	
Jutra Awards	March 17, 2013	Best Art Direction	André Guimond	Nominated	
Jutra Awards	March 17, 2013	Best Costume Design	Monic Ferland	Nominated	
Jutra Awards	March 17, 2013	Best Hairstyling	André Duval	Nominated	
Jutra Awards	March 17, 2013	Best Makeup	Marlène Rouleau	Nominated	
Jutra Awards	March 17, 2013	Best Sound	Pierre-Jules Audet, Luc Boudrias, Michel Lecoufle	Nominated	
