= Frédéric Bégin =

Canadian film score composer

Frédéric Bégin (born November 10, 1975, in Trois-Pistoles, Quebec) is a Canadian score composer. Bégin received two Gémeaux Awards at the 24th annual ceremony, both for his work on the second season of the Canadian television series Les Étoiles filantes (The Shooting Stars).

== Early life and education ==
Bégin graduated with a degree in music from the Université de Montréal.

== Filmography ==
=== Feature length ===
- 2005: Dodging the Clock (Horloge biologique)
- 2007: Bluff
- 2009: 1981
- 2010: Y'en aura pas de facile
- 2011: The Happiness of Others (Le Bonheur des autres)
- 2014: 1987
- 2015: Aurélie Laflamme - Les pieds sur terre
- 2015: The Mirage (Le Mirage)
- 2017: Threesome (Le Trip à trois)
- 2018: 1991
- 2020: The Guide to the Perfect Family (Le Guide de la famille parfaite)

=== Shorts ===
- 2004 : Nourri au Grain
- 2009 : Le Technicien
- 2016 : Introduction to Virtual Reality
- 2016 : Through the Ages: President Obama Celebrates America's National Parks
- 2017 : The People's House – Inside the White House with Barack and Michelle Obama
- 2019 : Mercy

=== Television ===
- 2004: Smash
- 2005: Smash 2
- 2006: 3X Rien (2006)
- 2006: Les Étoiles filantes (2006)
- 2007: Les Étoiles filantes 2
- 2007: Nos étés
- 2010: Malenfant
- 2010: En audition avec Simon
- 2012: Roxy
- 2014: Ces gars-là
- 2014: Le Berceau des anges (2015)
- 2020: La Maison-Bleue
- 2020: Les Mecs

== Awards and nominations ==
=== Awards ===
- 2015 : Gemeaux Awards : Best music for a dramatic series for Le Berceau des Anges )
- 2009 : Gemeaux Awards : Best music for a dramatic series for Les Étoiles filantes 2 )
- 2009 : Gemeaux Awards : Best musical theme for Les Étoiles filantes 2 )

=== Nominations ===
- 2004 : Best Music for Smash at Gemeaux Awards
- 2004 : Best musical Theme Smash at Gemeaux Awards
- 2006 : Best music Horloge biologique at Jutras Awards
- 2007 : Best musical theme Les Étoiles filantes at Gemeaux Awards
- 2007 : Best music Nos étés at Gemeaux Awards
- 2015 : Best music Le Berceau des Anges at Gemeaux Awards
- 2015 : Best musical theme Le Berceau des Anges at Gemeaux Awards
- 2019 : Best music 1991 at Gala Québec Cinéma
