= Shadi Janho =

Lebanese Canadian actor

Shadi Janho is a Lebanese Canadian actor. He is most noted for his performance in the film 1995, for which he received a Prix Iris nomination for Revelation of the Year at the 26th Quebec Cinema Awards.

He has also appeared in the television series District 31, Classé secret and Jack Ryan, the short film One Day This Kid, and the video game Star Wars Outlaws. He also portrayed Amin Al-Nawaz in the television series The Terminal List.
