= Nicole Robert (producer) =

Canadian film producer

Nicole Robert is a Canadian film producer.

She began her career as a producer with Rock Demers's Productions La Fête, the producer of the Tales for All (Contes pour tous) series of children's films, before leaving in 1987 to launch her own production firm, Lux Films. In 2000, Lux Films merged with another firm, Jet Films, to launch Go Films. GO Films was acquired by Sphere Media in 2018, with Robert remaining as president of the division.

== Filmography ==
- 1984 - The Dog Who Stopped the War (La Guerre des tuques)
- 1985 - The Peanut Butter Solution (Opération beurre de pinottes)
- 1986 - Desert Chase (Les Roses de Matmata)
- 1988 - Kalamazoo
- 1989 - Laura Laur
- 1991 - Les naufragés du Labrador
- 1992 - Requiem for a Handsome Bastard (Requiem pour un beau sans-cœur)
- 1994 - Windigo
- 1996 - Karmina
- 2000 - Saint Jude
- 2001 - Alias Betty (Betty Fisher et autres histoires)
- 2001 - Karmina 2
- 2002 - Québec-Montréal
- 2003 - Evil Words (Sur le seuil)
- 2004 - Love and Magnets (Les aimants)
- 2005 - Dodging the Clock (Horloge biologique)
- 2006 - Cheech
- 2008 - Everything Is Fine (Tout est parfait)
- 2008 - The Roberge Case (Le Cas Roberge)
- 2009 - 1981
- 2010 - 7 Days (Les 7 jours du Talion)
- 2010 - Face Time (Le Baiser du barbu)
- 2010 - Fear of Water (La Peur de l'eau)
- 2011 - L'Affaire Dumont
- 2014 - 1987
- 2015 - Noir
- 2015 - Anna
- 2016 - King Dave
- 2016 - Nelly
- 2018 - 1991
- 2019 - Fabulous (Fabuleuses)
- 2019 - Sympathy for the Devil (Sympathie pour le diable)
- 2020 - Flashwood
- 2022 - White Dog (Chien blanc)

== Awards ==
Award	Year	Category	Work	Result	Ref(s)
Genie Awards	1985	Best Motion Picture	The Dog Who Stopped the War (La Guerre des tuques) with Rock Demers	Nominated	
Genie Awards	1992	Best Motion Picture	Requiem for a Handsome Bastard (Requiem pour un beau sans-cœur) with Lorraine Dufour	Nominated	
Genie Awards	1997	Best Motion Picture	Karmina	Nominated	
Genie Awards	2003	Best Motion Picture	Québec-Montréal	Nominated	
Genie Awards	2009	Best Motion Picture	Everything Is Fine (Tout est parfait)	Nominated	
Canadian Screen Awards	2013	Best Motion Picture	L'Affaire Dumont	Nominated	
Prix Jutra/Iris	2003	Best Film	Québec-Montréal	Won	
Prix Jutra/Iris	2005	Best Film	Love and Magnets (Les aimants) with Gabriel Pelletier	Nominated	
Prix Jutra/Iris	2010	Best Film	1981	Nominated	
Prix Jutra/Iris	2015	Best Film	1987	Nominated	
Prix Jutra/Iris	2019	Best Film	1991	Won	
Prix Jutra/Iris	2020	Best Film	Fabulous (Fabuleuses)	Nominated	
