= The Happiness of Others =

2011 Canadian film directed by Jean-Philippe Pearson

- Film poster
- French: Le Bonheur des autres
- Directed by: Jean-Philippe Pearson
- Written by: Jean-Philippe Pearson
- Produced by: Christian Larouche
- Starring: Michel Barrette; Louise Portal; Marc-André Grondin; Ève Duranceau; Julie Le Breton
- Cinematography: Steve Asselin
- Edited by: Yvann Thibaudeau
- Music by: Frédéric Bégin
- Production company: Christal Films
- Distributed by: Les Films Séville
- Release date: October 7, 2011
- Running time: 101 minutes
- Country: Canada
- Language: French

The Happiness of Others (French: Le Bonheur des autres) is a Canadian comedy-drama film, directed by Jean-Philippe Pearson and released in 2011. The film centres on Jean-Pierre (Michel Barrette), a middle-aged man whose marriage to Louise (Louise Portal) broke up 20 years earlier, as he announces to Louise and their now-adult children Sylvain (Marc-André Grondin) and Marion (Ève Duranceau) that his new girlfriend Évelyne (Julie Le Breton) is pregnant.

The cast also includes Germain Houde, Stéphane Breton, Isabelle Vincent and Normand Daneau in supporting roles.

The film was shot in Montreal in 2010, and premiered on October 7, 2011.

== Critical response ==
Brendan Kelly of the Montreal Gazette rated the film just one star out of five, writing that "Le bonheur des autres should be a much better film than it is. There is the germ of a great idea lurking somewhere deep inside the first feature written and directed by Jean-Philippe Pearson but that good idea is smothered by a screenplay that's terminally flawed...First off, any movie that wastes the talent of someone as gifted as Marc-André Grondin has much to answer for. He plays Jean-Pierre's son Sylvain, and it's at Sylvain's 29th birthday dinner that his dad announces that he's set to have another kid. Sylvain's girlfriend dumps him in brutal fashion right at the start of the film, and that is about all that happens to him in the story. Much less convincing is the main couple, Jean-Pierre and Evelyne. How can I put this politely? Oh well, forget politeness. Jean-Pierre is such a jerk you don't for a minute believe someone as beautiful, smart and poised as Evelyne would spend a night with him, let alone form a family with him. Le Breton is pretty good - as always - but it just had me dreaming of the day this fine actress finally nabs the meaty big-screen role she deserves."

== Awards ==
Portal received a Jutra Award nomination for Best Supporting Actress at the 14th Jutra Awards in 2012.
