= Louis Morissette =

Canadian actor and screenwriter

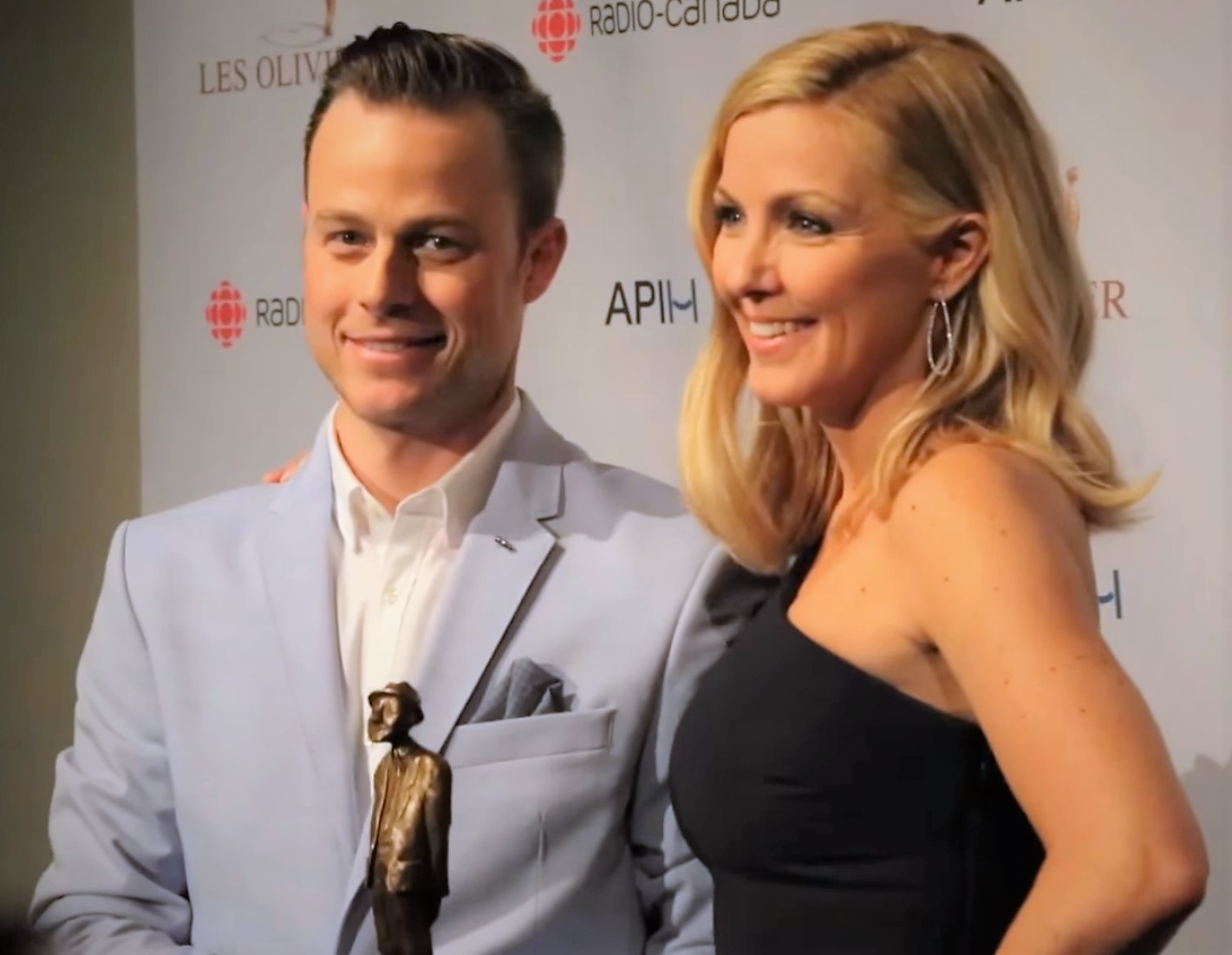
Morissette and Véronique Cloutier on Montreal.TV in 2016.

Louis Morissette (born July 19, 1973) is a Canadian actor and screenwriter from Drummondville, Quebec. He is most noted as a star and writer of the feature films The Mirage (Le Mirage) and The Guide to the Perfect Family (Le Guide de la famille parfaite).

He has also acted in the films The Comeback (Cabotins), Stay with Me (Reste avec moi), Liverpool, The Fall of the American Empire (La Chute de l'empire américain), Goodbye Happiness (Au revoir le bonheur) and François.e, and in the television series 3x rien, C.A. and Plan B; he has also been a regular writer for and sketch performer in Bye Bye, Ici Radio-Canada Télé's annual New Year's Eve special.

Morissette currently hosts Le maître du jeu, the Quebec adaptation of the UK panel show, Taskmaster.

He is married to television and radio host Véronique Cloutier. Together, they have two daughters, Delphine Cloutier-Morissette and Raphaelle Cloutier-Morissette, and a son, Justin Cloutier-Morissette.
