= Flashwood =

2020 Canadian drama film

- Film poster
- Directed by: Jean-Carl Boucher
- Written by: Jean-Carl Boucher
- Produced by: Jean-Carl Boucher; Nicole Robert
- Starring: Pier-Luc Funk; Antoine Desrochers; Simon Pigeon
- Cinematography: Steve Asselin; Louka Boutin
- Edited by: Charles Grenier
- Music by: Pierre-Philippe Côté
- Production company: Sphere Media
- Distributed by: Entract Films
- Release date: March 4, 2020 (RVQC)
- Running time: 92 minutes
- Country: Canada
- Language: French

Flashwood is a Canadian drama film, directed by Jean-Carl Boucher and released in 2020. Shot over a period of seven years and inspired by Boucher's own childhood in the Montreal suburb of Boisbriand, the film centres on a group of teenage friends whose lives and relationships evolve as the years pass.

The cast includes Pier-Luc Funk, Antoine Desrochers, Simon Pigeon, Maxime Desjardins-Tremblay, Laurent-Christophe de Ruelle, Karelle Tremblay, Martin Dubreuil, Sophie Nélisse, Mehdi Bousaidan, Martin Boily and Rose-Marie Perreault.

The film premiered on March 4, 2020 at the Rendez-vous Québec Cinéma. It premiered commercially on August 7.
