= Jean-Carl Boucher =

Canadian actor

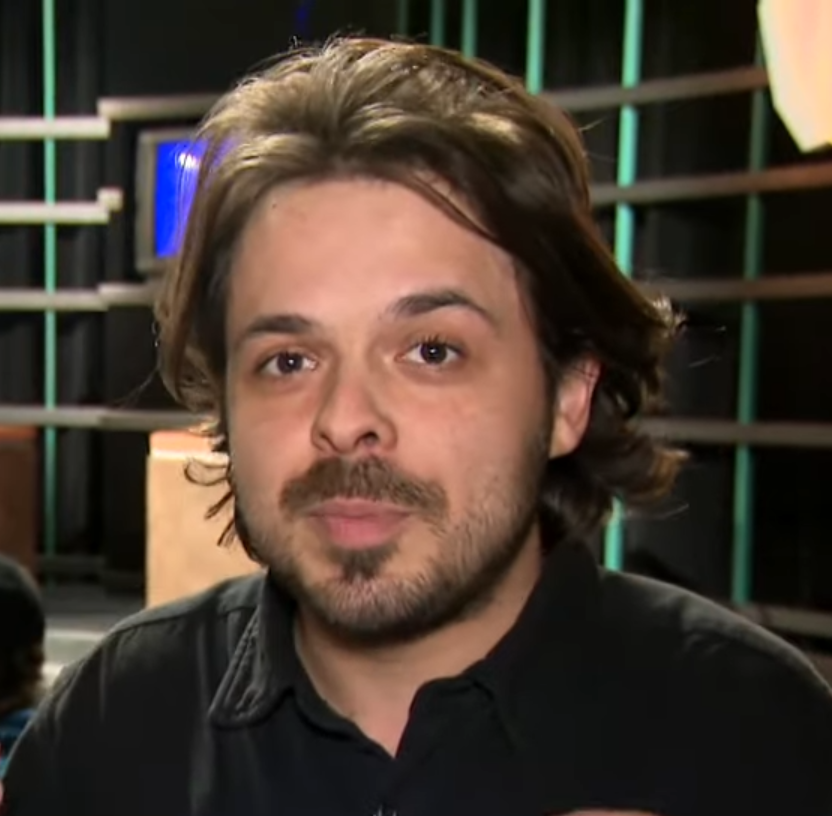
- Born: February 19, 1994 (age 32); Regina, Saskatchewan, Canada
- Occupation: Actor
- Years active: 2007–present

Jean-Carl Boucher (born February 19, 1994) is a Canadian actor and filmmaker from Quebec, best known for his recurring performances as a fictionalized version of filmmaker Ricardo Trogi in Trogi's semi-autobiographical series of comedy-drama films. To date he has played Trogi in the films 1981, 1987, 1991, and 1995.

He has been a four-time Jutra/Iris Award nominee for Best Actor, receiving nods at the 12th Jutra Awards in 2010 for 1981, the 17th Jutra Awards in 2015 for 1987, the 21st Quebec Cinema Awards in 2019 for 1991, and the 26th Quebec Cinema Awards in 2024 for 1995.

Flashwood, his debut feature film as a director, was released in 2020.

== Filmography ==
- 2007 - The Schoolyard (Les Grands)
- 2008 - A No-Hit No-Run Summer (Un été sans point ni coup sûr) : la Crevette
- 2009 - 1981 : Ricardo Trogi
- 2009 - Tactik : Diego Molina
- 2010 - Les Parent : Jessy
- 2014 - 1987 : Ricardo Trogi
- 2016 - The History of Love : Herman Connor
- 2018 - 1991 : Ricardo Trogi
- 2018 - Black Forest (Forêt Noire) : Danny Gauthier
- 2022 - The Cheaters (Les Tricheurs) : Marmotte
- 2024 - 1995 : Ricardo Trogi
