= Yvann Thibaudeau =

Canadian film editor

Yvann Thibaudeau (born April 4, 1973) is a Canadian film editor. He is most noted as a two-time Prix Jutra/Iris winner for Best Editing, winning at the 11th Jutra Awards in 2009 for Borderline and at the 21st Quebec Cinema Awards in 2019 for 1991.

He was also a nominee in the same category on two other occasions, and has been a five-time Genie Award and Canadian Screen Award nominee for Best Editing.

== Filmography ==
=== Film ===
- Les Boys - 1997
- The Kid - 1997
- The Minion - 1998
- Perpetrators of the Crime - 1999
- Laura Cadieux II (Laura Cadieux... la suite) - 2000
- Slow Burn - 2000
- Dead Awake - 2001
- On Your Head (Le ciel sur la tête) - 2001
- Hidden Agenda - 2001
- Cause of Death - 2001
- Inside - 2002
- Québec-Montréal - 2002
- Alice's Odyssey (L'odyssée d'Alice Tremblay) - 2002
- Summer - 2002
- Hatley High - 2003
- Fear of the Dark - 2003
- A Problem with Fear - 2003
- Mary Shelley - 2004
- Bittersweet Memories (Ma vie en cinémascope) - 2004
- Love and Magnets (Les aimants) - 2004
- White Skin - 2004
- Tideline (Littoral) - 2004
- A Different Loyalty - 2004
- Dodging the Clock (Horloge biologique) - 2005
- Idole instantanée - 2005
- Young Triffie - 2006
- Everything Is Fine (Tout est parfait) - 2008
- Borderline - 2008
- The Canadiens, Forever (Pour toujours, les Canadiens!) - 2009
- The Year I Became a Liar - 2009
- Free Fall (Les Pieds dans le vide) - 2009
- Piché: The Landing of a Man (Piché: entre ciel et terre) - 2010
- The Happiness of Others (Le bonheur des autres) - 2011
- Starbuck - 2011
- Hidden 3D - 2011
- French Kiss - 2011
- Funkytown - 2011
- Ésimésac - 2013
- Stay - 2013
- The F Word - 2013
- Louis Cyr - 2013
- 1987 - 2014
- La Garde - 2014
- Ville-Marie - 2015
- The Mirage - 2015
- Ballerina - 2016
- 9 - 2016
- Wait Till Helen Comes - 2016
- Devil's Gate - 2017
- Adventures in Public School - 2017
- The Extraordinary Journey of the Fakir - 2018
- Just a Breath Away (Dans la brume) - 2018
- 1991 - 2018
- Delphine - 2019
- Target Number One - 2020
- The Guide to the Perfect Family (Le Guide de la famille parfaite) - 2021
- Goodbye Happiness (Au revoir le bonheur) - 2021
- Niagara - 2022
- Two Days Before Christmas (23 décembre) - 2022
- Ladybug & Cat Noir: The Movie - 2023
- Days of Happiness (Les Jours heureux) - 2023
- Tell Me Why These Things Are So Beautiful (Dis-moi pourquoi ces choses sont si belles) - 2023
- All Stirred Up! (Tous toqués!) - 2024
- Once Upon My Mother (Ma mère, Dieu et Sylvie Vartan) - 2025
- Best Boy - 2025
- Villeneuve: The Rise of a Legend (Villeneuve : l'ascension d'une légende) - 2026
- You Will Be Free (Ma fille tu seras libre) - 2026

=== Television ===
- The Secret Adventures of Jules Verne - 2000
- Asbestos - 2002
- Les Invincibles - 2005-09
- Les Boys - 2008
- Windfall and Misfortunes - 2008
- Toute la vérité - 2010
- Malenfant - 2011
- Red Brazil - 2012-13
- Ces gars-là - 2014
- Série noire - 2014-16
- Le berceau des anges - 2015
- 19-2 - 2015-17
- This Life - 2016
- Les Simone - 2016-18
- Sur-Vie - 2017
- Blue Moon - 2016-18
- The Disappearance - 2017
- Cheval Serpent - 2018
- District 31 - 2019
- Eaux turbulentes - 2019-20
- Street Legal - 2019
- La Maison-Bleue - 2021
- Sans rendez-vous - 2021
- Virage - 2021
- Les Mecs - 2020-2021
- Transplant - 2020-present

== Awards ==
Award	Ceremony	Category	Film	Result	Ref(s)
Prix Iris	11th Jutra Awards	Best Editing	Borderline	Won	
Prix Iris	17th Jutra Awards	Best Editing	1987	Nominated	
Prix Iris	21st Quebec Cinema Awards	Best Editing	1991	Won	
Prix Iris	23rd Quebec Cinema Awards	Best Editing	Target Number One	Nominated	
Genie Awards	23rd Genie Awards	Best Editing	Québec-Montréal	Nominated	
Genie Awards	25th Genie Awards	Best Editing	Bittersweet Memories (Ma vie en cinémascope)	Nominated	
Genie Awards	29th Genie Awards	Best Editing	Borderline	Nominated	
Genie Awards	31st Genie Awards	Best Editing	Piché: The Landing of a Man (Piché: entre ciel et terre)	Nominated	
Canadian Screen Awards	10th Canadian Screen Awards	Best Editing	Goodbye Happiness (Au revoir le bonheur)	Nominated	
