= 1991 (film) =

- Directed by: Ricardo Trogi
- Written by: Ricardo Trogi
- Produced by: Nicole Robert
- Starring: Jean-Carl Boucher; Sandrine Bisson; Juliette Gosselin
- Narrated by: Ricardo Trogi
- Cinematography: Steve Asselin
- Edited by: Yvann Thibaudeau
- Music by: Frédéric Bégin
- Production company: GO Films
- Distributed by: Les Films Seville, Entertainment One
- Release date: July 27, 2018
- Running time: 101 minutes
- Country: Canada
- Language: French

1991 is a Québecois (french canadien) comedy-drama film, written and directed by Ricardo Trogi, and released in 2018. The third film in his semi-autobiographical series after 1981 and 1987, the film centres on Trogi's (Jean-Carl Boucher) 1991 trip to Italy to pursue a relationship with Marie-Ève (Juliette Gosselin).

The film finished 2018 as the year's top-grossing Canadian film, and was named the winner of the Golden Screen Award at the 7th Canadian Screen Awards. It received 16 Prix Iris nominations at the 21st Quebec Cinema Awards, including Best Film.

== Plot ==
In 1991, Ricardo Trogi is 21 and studies cinema at Université du Québec à Montréal (UQAM) in Montréal. His friend and “the woman of his life”, Marie-Ève Bernard, invites him to go in Italy to study Italian in Perugia. Determined, Ricardo accepts without hesitation.

After landing in Paris, Ricardo takes a train to Perugia, where he meets Arturo, a stowaway who earns his living by playing Like a Rolling Stone on guitar in the streets. On arrival, failing to find Marie-Ève, Ricardo accidentally loses his passport, money, and acceptance letter to the University of Perugia. Ricardo goes to the Canadian Embassy in Rome to get a new passport and emergency funds. In the meantime, he cannot check into any hotel without a passport. While spending the night at the train station, he meets Arturo again.

Back in Perugia the next day, having already missed two days of school, Ricardo is assigned an apartment with Mamadou, from Burkina Faso. After partying all night, Ricardo wakes beside a Greek woman named Yorda. The next morning, Marie-Ève shows up and explains she is sharing an apartment with Raphi, a Spanish student, with whom she leaves on a field trip to Florence. Ricardo stumbles upon Arturo again and continues to see Yorda, even though he still has feelings for Marie-Ève. He is dismayed to catch her having sex with Raphi.

Ricardo confronts Marie-Ève about how he feels. He explains that he only came for her and doesn't care about anything else in Italy, that no ordinary friends would do this. Marie-Ève rejects his feelings kindly, but Ricardo, tired, heartbroken, and disgusted, leaves without a word. Marie-Ève regrets their disappointment.

The next morning, he decides to leave Perugia for good. Yorda catches him and says a heartfelt goodbye. Ricardo stumbles upon Arturo one last time on the train, even as he imagines Marie-Ève singing Like A Rolling Stone.

== Accolades ==
Award	Date of ceremony	Category	Recipient(s)	Result	Ref(s)
Canadian Screen Awards	31 March 2019	Best Visual Effects	Jean-François Talbot, Jean-Pierre Boies	Nominated	
Canadian Screen Awards	31 March 2019	Best Sound	Michel Lecoufle, Sylvain Brassard	Nominated	
Canadian Screen Awards	31 March 2019	Best Hair	Daniel Jacob	Nominated	
Canadian Screen Awards	31 March 2019	Golden Screen Award		Won	
Prix Iris	2 June 2019	Best Film	Nicole Robert	Won	
Prix Iris	2 June 2019	Best Director	Ricardo Trogi	Won	
Prix Iris	2 June 2019	Best Screenplay	Ricardo Trogi	Nominated	
Prix Iris	2 June 2019	Best Actor	Jean-Carl Boucher	Nominated	
Prix Iris	2 June 2019	Best Supporting Actress	Sandrine Bisson	Won	
Prix Iris	2 June 2019	Best Supporting Actor	Alexandre Nachi	Nominated	
Prix Iris	2 June 2019	Best Art Direction	Christian Legaré	Nominated	
Prix Iris	2 June 2019	Best Cinematography	Steve Asselin	Nominated	
Prix Iris	2 June 2019	Best Sound	Sylvain Brassard, Michel Lecoufle	Nominated	
Prix Iris	2 June 2019	Best Editing	Yvann Thibaudeau	Won	
Prix Iris	2 June 2019	Best Original Music	Frédéric Bégin	Nominated	
Prix Iris	2 June 2019	Best Visual Effects	Jean-Pierre Boies, Jean-François Talbot	Nominated	
Prix Iris	2 June 2019	Best Costume Design	Anne-Karine Gauthier	Nominated	
Prix Iris	2 June 2019	Best Makeup	Virginie Boudreau	Nominated	
Prix Iris	2 June 2019	Best Hair	Daniel Jacob	Nominated	
Prix Iris	2 June 2019	Public Prize		Won	
