= Sandrine Bisson =

Canadian actress

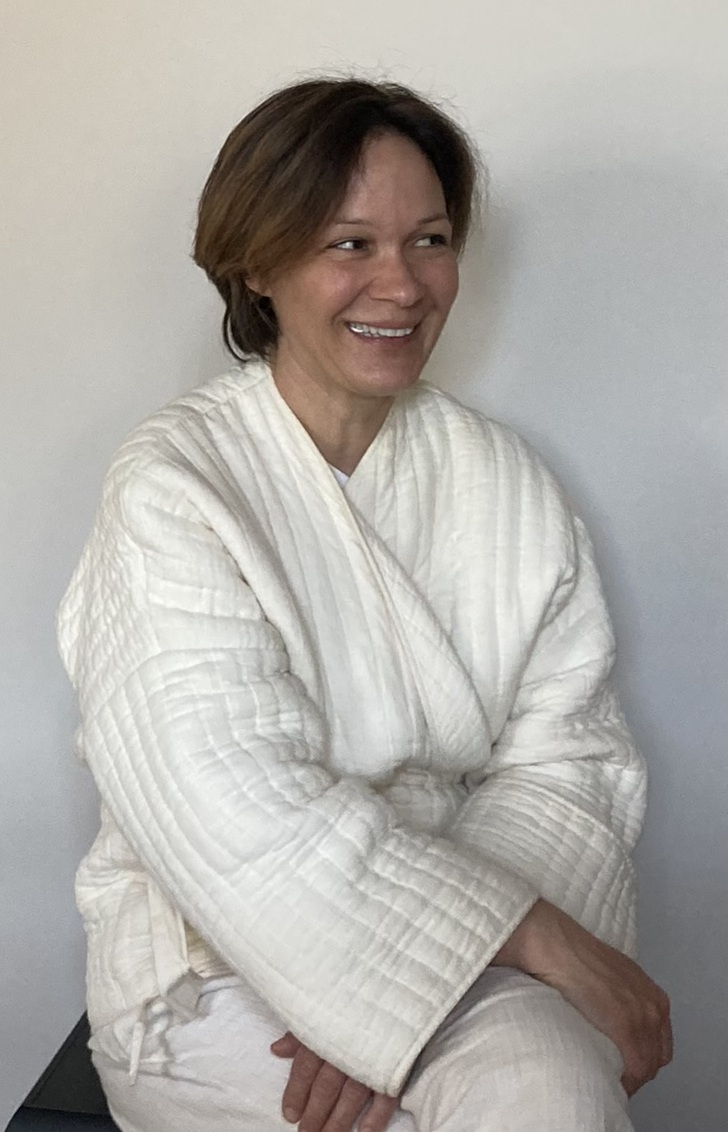
Sandrine Bisson

Sandrine Bisson (born June 22, 1975, in Quebec City, Quebec) is a Canadian actress from Quebec. She won the Jutra Award for Best Supporting Actress at the 12th Jutra Awards in 2010 for her performance in 1981, and was a nominee in the same category at the 14th Jutra Awards in 2012 for Fear of Water (La peur de l'eau) and at the 17th Jutra Awards in 2015 for 1987, and a Canadian Screen Award nominee at the 3rd Canadian Screen Awards in 2015 for 1987.

She has also acted in television and on stage.

== Filmography ==
=== Film ===
Year	Title	Role	Notes
2000	Riders (Hochelaga)	Waitress	
2000	Méchant party	Junkie prostitute	
2002	The Negro (Le Nèg')	Samantha	
2003	Gaz Bar Blues	Ticket agent	
2005	The Outlander (Le Survenant)	Yéniche	
2006	Deliver Me (Délivrez-moi)	Pet shop clerk	
2006	Duo	Mochika Full Vide	
2008	Borderline	DASA Girl	
2009	1981	Claudette Trogi	
2009	The Canadiens, Forever (Pour toujours, les Canadiens)	Hélène	
2011	Coteau rouge	Gabrielle	
2011	Solar Wind (Vent solaire)	Louise	
2011	Fear of Water (La peur de l'eau)	Majella Bourgeois	
2012	La Belle Province		
2013	Discopathe	Francine Léveillée	
2013	Summer Crisis (La maison du pêcheur)	Lucie	
2013	Daybreak (Éclat du jour)		
2014	1987	Claudette Trogi	
2014	La Garde	Sylvie Bisaillon	
2014	Tentacules 8, le retour de la chose		
2014	Evening Glory		
2014	Douce amère	Mother	
2014	Élégie	Sandrine	
2015	Blue Thunder (Bleu tonnerre)	Sister	
2015	Ego Trip	Josée	
2015	Ville-Marie	Waitress	
2015	Overpass (Viaduc)	Louise	
2015	Anna		
2016	Grimaces	Conference host	
2016	Amen		
2016	Fluffy Marky, Vol. 1	Isabelle	
2016	Mutants	Suzanne	
2017	Vétérane	Camélia	
2017	Innocent		
2017	We Are the Freak Show (Nous sommes le Freak Show)	Sandrine	
2017	Marguerite	Rachel	
2017	Fluffy Marky, Vol. 2	Isabelle	
2018	1991	Claudette Trogi	
2019	August. September (août. septembre.)	Psychologist	
2019	Be Good (Sois sage)	Sonia	
2021	444	First mother	
2021	dieu @ mail.com	Waitress	
2021	Trophée		
2021	Confessions of a Hitman (Confessions)	Jocelyne Lacroix	
2022	Very Nice Day (Très belle journée)		
2022	Arlette		
2023	My Mother's Men (Les hommes de ma mère)	Michou	
2024	1995	Claudette Trogi	
2024	The Little Shopping Trolley (Le petit panier à roulettes)	Sophie	
2024	You Are Not Alone (Vous n'êtes pas seul)	Sylvie Marcoux	
2024	Mercenaire	Isabelle	
2025	The Furies (Les Furies)	Kathleen	
2025	Cardboard City (Ville Jacques-Carton)	Sandrine	

=== Television ===
Year	Title	Role	Notes
2005-06	Le négociateur	Sonia Lupien	Two episodes
2010	Toute la vérité	Marie Villeneuve	One episode
2010	Prozac, la maladie du bonheur	Marie	10 episodes
2011	Malenfant	Ginette	One episode
2011	Mauvais Karma		One episode
2012	Trauma	Nathalie Lefebvre	One episode
2014	Les beaux malaises	Marcel's neighbour	One episode
2015	Mensonges	Kristina Scott	One episode
2015	Le Berceau des anges	Sarah Weiman	Five episodes
2015	Yamaska	Katia Robati	Two episodes
2016	Ça décolle	Obsessed woman	
2016-17	L'Imposteur	Annick Devost	17 episodes
2017	Terreur 404	Chantal	One episode
2017	GAME(R)	Francine	Four episodes
2017	Plan B	Carina	Four episodes
2018-20	L'Écrivain public	Jojo	Six episodes
2018	Marc-en-Péluche	Marc's mother	One episode
2018	Les Simone	Sexologist	One episode
2019	Le Chalet	Odette	One episode
2019	Fragile	Cynthia Couture	10 episodes
2019-22	Léo	Chantal	Four episodes
2019-22	Comedi-Ha!	Sylvie	Two episodes
2020	GAME(R) II	Francine	
2020	Epidemic	Évelyne Pelletier	Six episodes
2021	Défense d'entrer	Mother	
2021	Virage	Geneviève	Three episodes
2022-24	Le Bonheur	Mélanie	11 episodes
2022-24	Last Summers of the Raspberries (Le temps des framboises)	Élisabeth Daveluy	20 episodes
2024	Discrètes		
2024	Bye Bye		One episode
2025	Double jeu	Isabelle Poitras	One episode
2025	Gâtées pourries	Jacinthe	One episode
