= Fear of Water (2011 film) =

2011 film by Gabriel Pelletier

- Film poster
- French: La Peur de l'eau
- Directed by: Gabriel Pelletier
- Written by: Gabriel Pelletier; Marcel Beaulieu
- Produced by: Nicole Robert
- Starring: Pierre-François Legendre; Brigitte Pogonat; Normand D'Amour; Pascale Bussières; Stéphanie Lapointe
- Cinematography: Nicolas Bolduc
- Edited by: Glenn Berman
- Music by: Laurent Eyquem
- Production company: Go Films
- Distributed by: Remstar
- Release date: November 19, 2011
- Running time: 122 minutes
- Country: Canada
- Language: French

Fear of Water (French: La Peur de l'eau) is a Canadian thriller drama film, directed by Gabriel Pelletier and released in 2011. The film stars Pierre-François Legendre as André Surprenant, a police officer in the Magdalen Islands who is investigating the rape and murder of the mayor's daughter Rosalie (Stéphanie Lapointe).

The film's cast also includes Brigitte Pogonat, Sandrine Bisson, Isabelle Cyr, Paul Doucet, Normand D'Amour, Pierre-Luc Brillant, Germain Houde and Pascale Bussières.

The film was inspired by, but not a direct adaptation of, Jean Lemieux's crime novel On finit toujours par payer.

The film had its theatrical premiere in November 2011, before going into commercial release in January 2012.

== Awards ==
The film received two Jutra Award nominations at the 14th Jutra Awards in 2012, for Best Supporting Actress (Bisson) and Best Sound (Mario Auclair, Pierre-Jules Audet and Luc Boudrias). It won the award for Best Film at the Festival international du film policier de Liège in 2012.
