= Hidden Agenda (2001 film) =

2001 film by Marc S. Grenier

- Official DVD cover
- Directed by: Marc S. Grenier
- Written by: Les Waldon
- Produced by: Shimon Dotan
- Starring: Dolph Lundgren
- Cinematography: Sylvain Brault
- Edited by: Yvann Thibaudeau
- Music by: Jerry Devilliers
- Production company: Trimark
- Release date: 2001
- Running time: 95 minutes
- Country: Canada
- Language: English

Hidden Agenda is a 2001 Canadian action film written by Les Walton and directed by Marc S. Grenier. It stars Dolph Lundgren as Jason Price, who is a former government agent who now earns money helping people disappear through a program he engineered. When his childhood friend Sonny (Ted Whittall) and mobster Paul Elkert (Serge Houde) both come to Price for help, things begin to go awry. Someone has infiltrated Price's network, and his clients begin turning up dead. He is helped in his investigation by the mobster's assistant, Renee Brooks (Maxim Roy) -- but no one is who they seem to be.

== Plot ==
Jason Price, a former NSA agent, operates the Daedalus network, which gives clients new identities and makes them disappear. As he lavishes a key witness against a lot of money and is hounded by a hitman (called the Cleaner), he not only sucks the FBI's anger, but also the crime syndicate Icarus, who also turns the Cleaner on his best friend, the FBI agent Sonny begin. When Price also lets him submerge and shortly thereafter finds out Sonny's corpse, he realizes that the network has been infiltrated. Price follows the bloody trail of the Cleaner, which leads him not only to the true identity of the Cleaner, but also to its backers.

== Cast ==
- Dolph Lundgren as NSA Agent Jason Price
- Maxim Roy as Renee Brooks
- Brigitte Paquette as Connie Glenn
- Ted Whittall as FBI Agent Sonny Mathis
- Serge Houde as Paul Elkert
- Alan Fawcett as Sam Turgenson
- Francis X. McCarthy as NSA Deputy Director Powell
- Harry Standjofski as Kevin
- Christian Paul as Charlie Radisson
- Andreas Apergis as Boris Yoesky
- Jeff Hall as Vincent Moretti
- Cas Anvar as FBI Agent McCoomb
- Lynne Adams as Prosecutor
- Alan Legros as Jerry
- Jay Levalley as Paolo Bucci
