= Riley Rocket (TV series) =

- Genre: Superhero; Action; Musical; Comedy; Educational
- Created by: Matthew Gerrand; Mladen Alexander
- Voices of: Kaitlyn Fitzpatrick; Shiloh Obasi; Jacob Mazeral; Rebecca Auerbach
- Opening theme: Riley Rocket Theme Song
- Ending theme: Riley Rocket Theme Song (Instrumental)
- Country of origin: Canada
- Original language: English
- No. of seasons: 1
- No. of episodes: 30

Production
- Executive producers: Andrea Griffith; Marlo Miazaga; Bruno Dubé; Sean Connolly; Jaques Bilodeau; Isabelle Bilodeau
- Running time: 22-23 minutes (11-12 minutes per segment)
- Production company: Sphere Media

Original release
- Network: TVO Kids; Knowledge Kids
- Release: September 30, 2023 – present

Riley Rocket is a Canadian children's animated series created by Matthew Gerrand and Mladen Alexander and produced by Sphere Media. It follows Riley Rockwell, her pet hedgehog Beatrix and her bandmates, Theo and Alex. During her jam session, an electrifying sonic surge super charged them, turning them into superheroes. In addition to their instruments, Riley's wheelchair, Alex's skateboard and Theo's bike also transform themselves when the characters become superheroes and with help from Riley's Aunt Jenny, they will save Greenville from evil villains.

== Plot ==
Young Riley and the members of her group MegaBlast have supersonic powers, and they transform themselves into secret superheroes who use the power of their music to save their community. In addition to their instruments, Riley's wheelchair, Alex's skateboard and Theo's bike also transform themselves when the characters become superheroes.

== Characters ==
=== Main ===
- Riley Rockwell/Rocket (voiced by Kaitlyn Fitzpatrick) - The main protagonist of the series. When the electrified sonic surge hit her, her band and her wheelchair turns into a flying machine.
- Theo/Thunder (voiced by Shiloh Obasi) - The best keytar player in all of Greenville. When the electrified super sonic surge hit him and his bandmates his bike becomes a flying machine.
- Alex/Metallix (voiced by Jacob Mazeral) - A boy who likes being super loud. When the electrified supersonic surge hit him and his bandmates, his skateboard becomes a hoverboard.
- Beatrix/Trix - Riley's pet hedgehog. When the electrified supersonic surge hit, she becomes one in a million, and her ball becomes a flying machine.
- Aunt Jenny “AJ” Rockwell (voiced by Rebecca Auerbach) - Riley's aunt and former roadie and owner of a music shop who is the only one who knows the band's secret and manages them.

=== Minor ===
- Tina Rockwell (voiced by Elena Juatco) - Riley's mother.
- Jon Rockwell (voiced by Steve Valentine) - Riley's father.

=== Villains ===
- Kaboom (voiced by Ian Ho) - A boy with a love of science and inventing things who causes mayhem with his creations.
- Dr. Dandelion (voiced by Jonathan Tan) - An overly enthusiastic horticulturist who wants nature to take over the world.
- Starlet (voiced by Samantha Weinstein) - A former child star trying to recapture her glory days using a voice-modifying microphone that causes havoc.
- Stewie Gooey (voiced by Desmond Sivan) - The youngest baddie who becomes "Gooey" and slimes the town when stressed.
- Metal Mike (voiced by Steve Valentine) - A robotic villain who always seeks to become the best guitar shredder in the world.
- The Copycats - A trio of friends (all named Rachel) who are besties that enjoy roller skating, shapeshifting, and mischief.

== Episodes ==
=== Season 1 ===
No. overall	No. in season	Title	Original Release Date
1	1	Pitch Perfect/Rockin To The Oldies	September 30, 2023
2	1	Mega Magnet/I Scream You Scream	October 26, 2023
3	1	So Long Solo/The Starlet Storm	November 6, 2023
4	1	Pop Till You Drop/Groove It Or Loose It	November 10, 2023
5	1	Forever Friends/Settle The Score	November 18, 2023
6	1	Oh Snow You Don't/Greenville Goes Green	December 2023
7	1	Something Shifty/Messing With The Music	December 6, 2023
8	1	Doc And The Beanstalk/Kaboom Kabot	TBA
9	1	Race Day/Home For The Hoedown	TBA
10	1	Rock A Bye Baddie/Rock The Block	TBA
11	1	Rolling With Riley/Bad Day For A Baddie	TBA
12	1	Be The Changemaker/Merch Mayhem	TBA
13	1	Mega Clash	January 13, 2024
14	1	Hitting The Right Notes/Little Red Rileyhood	January 20, 2024
15	1	Pet Peeves/There's No Place Like Home	January 29, 2024
