= Émilie Bierre =

Canadian actress (born 2004)

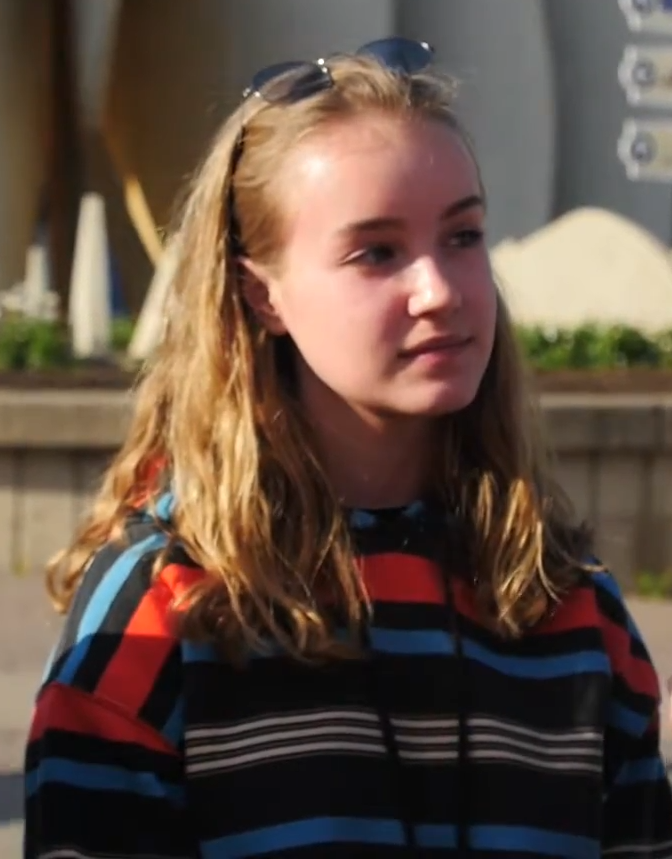
- Bierre in 2018
- Born: 12 May 2004 (age 21); Quebec, Canada
- Occupation: Actress

Émilie Bierre (born 12 May 2004) is a French-Canadian actress from Quebec. She is most noted for her performance in the film A Colony (Une colonie), for which she won the Canadian Screen Award for Best Actress at the 7th Canadian Screen Awards in 2019.

Bierre began modelling for Souris Mini children's clothing at age four. She won a Young Artist Award in 2018 for her performance in the television series Jenny. For A Colony, Bierre won the Prix Iris for Revelation of the Year at the 21st Quebec Cinema Awards, and Best Performance in a Borsos Competition film at the Whistler Film Festival.

She has also appeared in the films Catimini, Genesis (Genèse), The Far Shore (Dérive), Our Own (Les Nôtres) and The Guide to the Perfect Family (Le Guide de la famille parfaite), and in the television series Mémoires vives, Les beaux malaises and Lâcher prise. For Our Own, she received the Prix Iris for Best Actress at the 22nd (B) Quebec Cinema Awards.
