= The Mirage (2015 film) =

- Theatrical release poster
- French: Le Mirage
- Directed by: Ricardo Trogi
- Written by: Louis Morissette
- Produced by: Christian Larouche
- Starring: Louis Morissette; Julie Perreault; Christine Beaulieu; Patrice Robitaille
- Cinematography: Jonathan Decoste
- Edited by: Yvann Thibaudeau
- Music by: Frédéric Bégin
- Production companies: Christal Films Productions; KO24
- Distributed by: Les Films Christal
- Release date: 5 August 2015 (Canada)
- Running time: 101 minutes
- Country: Canada
- Language: French

The Mirage (French: Le Mirage) is a 2015 Canadian comedy-drama film from Quebec. Written by Louis Morissette and directed by Ricardo Trogi, the film marked Trogi's first time directing a screenplay he had not written himself.

The film stars Morissette as Patrick Lupien, an owner of a sporting goods store who is becoming dissatisfied with the empty consumerism of his day-to-day life and the loss of emotional and sexual intimacy in his relationship with Isabelle (Julie Perreault).

Critics compared the film's themes and plot to both The Decline of the American Empire and American Beauty.

The film was the second highest-grossing Quebec film of 2015, after Snowtime!

== Plot ==
Patrick, a sporting goods store manager, is in his office watching a pornographic film, which features two buxom women and a pool boy. Patrick does a walkthrough of the store, and informs various employees to please not text while they should be working. On his way home, he ogles a pretty blond driving a convertible, and runs into the back of another car causing minor damage. At home, he complains about his wife's spending, and the cost of some necessary work on their very nice suburban home. His wife Isabelle (Isa) mentions that she has been off on stress leave. That evening, they try to have sex, but Isa complains that her antidepressants suppress her sex drive.

At his son's soccer game, he chats with Michel, another father. Michel and his wife, Roxanne, come over for dinner. Patrick and Isa humble-brag about how much their new kitchen has cost them. After dinner, in the hot tub, the neighbour wife shows off her $6,000 boob job, taking off her top so Isa can see how small the scars are and feel how realistic they are. Later Patrick is watching the same porn movie, but one of the characters now is played by the neighbour. Patrick himself is the pool boy.

Back at work, a supplier says he cannot deliver the next season's merchandise until the previous bill is paid. After work the two couples go out for a nice dinner. When Patrick's main credit card is rejected, he pays the bill with two credit cards and some cash. On the way home the other couple suggest that they drop into a swinger's club. The other couple have been two or three times previously, and have fantasized about having sex with Patrick and Isa. Isa is uncomfortable, but still enjoys a kiss with the other wife.

The next day at work, the mall landlord informs Patrick that he will be raising his rent. Patrick tried to get a loan to make some improvements to the store, but is rejected by the bank because he is already overextended.

Patrick sets up a tennis game with Roxanne. He enjoys watching her boobs while she volleys. She suggests that she show Patrick a nice ski chalet that she is the sales agent for. Although Patrick knows they cannot afford it, he says he may take her up on it later.

Isa asks Patrick if she should get a boob job, and reminds him that the $4,500 cost of their son's school is due. Patrick knows they cannot afford either. Isa is upset that Patrick does not want her looking better.

Patrick suggests that he and Roxanne travel to a mixed doubles tennis competition. Roxanne is busy with some open houses, and declines. Instead, Patrick asks a co-worker if she would like to travel to a sales meeting. She is excited and agrees. When they arrive, they find the hotel room they planned to share has only one bed instead of two. Neither are too upset. At the sales meeting, Patrick finds out that his franchise is being taken back by the parent company. The sales girl enjoys the night out, they return to the room, where they have sex. Patrick is too aggressive, and the girl leaves when they are finished.

Patrick arranges to see the chalet with Roxanne, but comes on to her while they are checking it out. She bluntly tells him no, but he still tries. She throws him out, and calls her husband, who goes over to see Isa. Patrick arrives home, and waits for Michel to leave. Isa is very upset, and while they argue, he reveals to her that they are on the brink of bankruptcy, resulting in Isa throwing him out of the house. He heads to their small trailer, and thinks about reconnecting with his family and friends while jogging. He imagines returning home to his loving children, but realizes that Isa will have called her mother, and they will not let him return. He returns to his run as the credits roll.
