= Ricardo Trogi =

Canadian filmmaker, director and actor

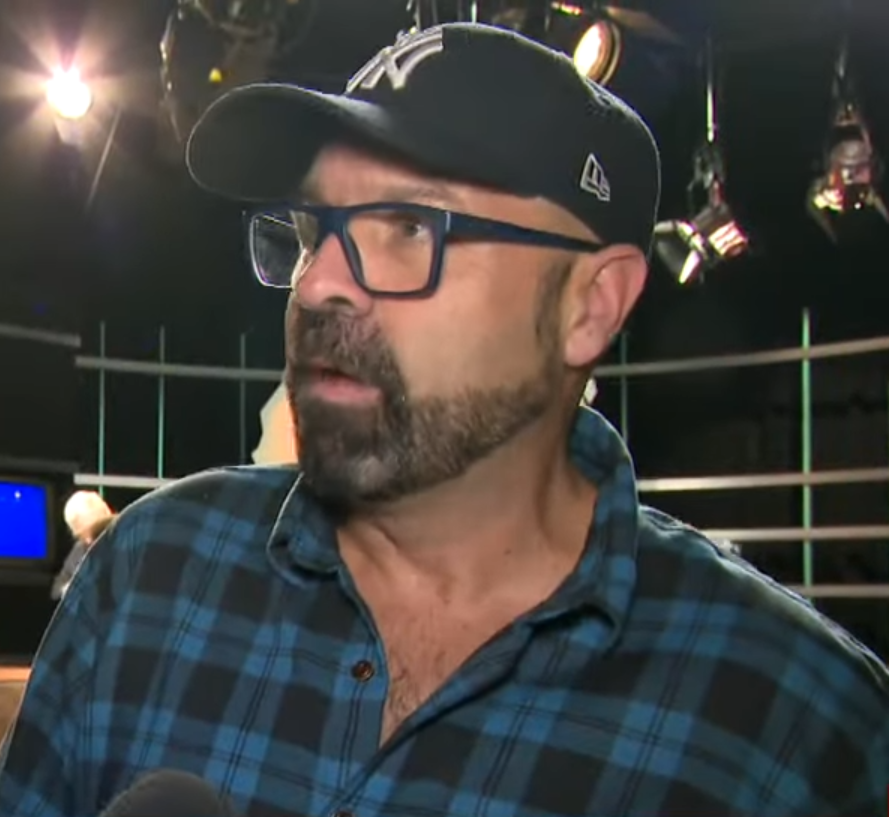
- Born: March 25, 1970 (age 56); Quebec city
- Known for: Québec-Montréal, 1991 (film)

Ricardo Trogi (born March 25, 1970) is a Canadian filmmaker, director and actor.

== Career ==
Trogi was born in Quebec City, Quebec. He began his filmmaking career as a contestant in the 1994-95 edition of La Course destination monde, tying with François Prévost for the win at the end of the season.

His first two feature films, Québec-Montréal, about seven twenty-something travellers driving between the two cities, and Dodging the Clock (Horloge biologique), a look at three men and their decisions about having children, were both critical and commercial hits. Quebec-Montréal received four Jutra Awards.

His third feature, titled 1981, was a semi-autobiographical film about his own coming of age, and was released in September 2009. It was followed by the sequel films 1987 in 2014, 1991 in 2018, and 1995 in 2024.

In addition to his film work, Trogi also directed the 2004-2005 television series Smash and the 2020 comedy series La Maison-Bleue.

As of 2024, Trogi holds the record for the most films by a Canadian director to surpass $1 million in box office sales in the Quebec market; seven of his films have reached that benchmark.

== Awards ==
- Jutra Award for Best Director, Québec-Montréal (2003)
- Prix Iris for Best Director, 1991 (2019)

== Filmography ==
=== Director ===
Films

- 2002: Québec-Montréal
- 2005: Dodging the Clock (Horloge biologique)
- 2009: 1981
- 2014: 1987
- 2015: The Mirage (Le Mirage)
- 2016: 9 (9, le film): Segment "Fuite"
- 2018: 1991
- 2021: The Guide to the Perfect Family (Le guide de la famille parfaite)
- 2024: 1995

TV series

- 1988: La Course destination monde (TV documentary series)
- 2004: Smash (TV mini-series)
- 2006: La chambre no 13 (TV mini-series)
- 2007: Les étoiles filantes (TV series)
- 2011: Malenfant (TV series)
- 2016: Les Simone (TV series)
- 2020: La Maison-Bleue
- 2024: Lakay Nou

=== Screenwriter ===
- 2002: Québec-Montréal
- 2005: Dodging the Clock
- 2009: 1981
- 2014: 1987
- 2018: 1991
- 2024: 1995

=== Actor ===
- 2002: Québec-Montréal as a police agent
- 2009: 1981 as narrator
- 2010: Face Time (Le Baiser du barbu) as Frank
- 2014: 1987 as narrator
- 2018: 1991 as narrator
