= La Maison-Bleue =

La Maison-Bleue ("The Blue House") is a Canadian television comedy series, which premiered in 2020 on Ici TOU.TV.

Created by Daniel Savoie and Ricardo Trogi, the series is set in an alternate reality in which the Yes side won the 1995 Quebec referendum, and stars Guy Nadon as Jacques Hamelin, the fourth president of the independent Republic of Quebec. Buffeted by both a struggling economy and the emergence of a popular movement demanding that Quebec rejoin Canada, he hits on a scheme to revive his popularity by negotiating with the United States to trade Nord-du-Québec to American control in exchange for Quebec taking possession of Florida.

The cast also includes Anne-Marie Cadieux as First Lady Mireille Turcotte, a former Quebec Winter Carnival queen with whom Hamelin has virtually no actual relationship away from the television cameras; Anyjeanne Savaria as Jacques and Mireille's adopted daughter Gabrielle; Geneviève Schmidt as Blue House communications director Karine Desmarais; Simon Beaulé-Bulman as presidential advisor Antoine Arsenault; Dominic Paquet as presidential bodyguard Stéphane Paquet; and Bruce Dinsmore as U.S. president Lester Richards.

The series entered production in 2019 and was filmed in Quebec City and Montreal. The ten-episode first season premiered February 11, 2020 on TOU.TV, and was broadcast by Ici Radio-Canada Télé in 2021. A second season went into production in fall 2020 for broadcast in 2021.

The series has drawn criticism from actual Quebec sovereigntists for purportedly mocking the concept of Quebec independence.

Nadon received a Prix Gémeaux nomination for Best Actor in a Comedy Series in 2020.
