= Québec-Montréal =

- Directed by: Ricardo Trogi
- Written by: Patrice Robitaille; Jean-Philippe Pearson; Ricardo Trogi
- Produced by: Nicole Robert; Richard Speer
- Starring: Patrice Robitaille; Jean-Philippe Pearson; Stéphane Breton; François Létourneau; Isabelle Blais; Julie Le Breton
- Cinematography: Steve Asselin
- Edited by: Yvann Thibaudeau
- Music by: Nathalie Boileau; Pierre Desrochers
- Production company: Go Films
- Distributed by: Alliance Atlantis Vivafilm
- Release date: August 2, 2002
- Running time: 104 minutes
- Country: Canada
- Language: French

Québec-Montréal is a 2002 Canadian comedy film, directed by Ricardo Trogi. The film was adapted for the stage by Pierre-François Legendre in 2025.

== Plot ==
Nine young adults, all on the cusp of turning 30 and dealing with complex questions about life and love, whose lives intersect on four separate road trips from Quebec City to Montreal along Quebec Autoroute 20, with one memorable scene of Pierre-François conversing with an animated moose of a road sign about the bigger schemes of life.

== Cast ==
- Patrice Robitaille as Rob
- Jean-Philippe Pearson as J.P.
- Stéphane Breton as Rivard
- François Létourneau as Cossette
- Isabelle Blais as Katherine
- Julie LeBreton as Julie
- Pierre-François Legendre as Pierre-François
- Tony Conte as Demers
- Patrick Baby as Pelletier
- Benoît Gouin as Mike Gauvin
- Brigitte St-Aubin as Mylène
- Marie-Ginette Guay as Ghisèle

== Reception ==
=== Awards ===
Québec-Montréal garnered four Genie Award nominations at the 23rd Genie Awards in 2003, including Best Picture, Best Director, Best Original Screenplay and Best Editing. It won four Jutra Awards at the 5th Jutra Awards, including Best Picture, Best Director, Best Screenplay and Best Supporting Actress (Blais), and was nominated but did not win for Best Actor (Robitaille), Best Supporting Actor (Gouin) and Best Score.
