= 1987 (film) =

- Film poster
- Directed by: Ricardo Trogi
- Written by: Ricardo Trogi
- Produced by: Nicole Robert
- Starring: Jean-Carl Boucher; Sandrine Bisson
- Narrated by: Ricardo Trogi
- Cinematography: Steve Asselin
- Edited by: Yvann Thibaudeau
- Music by: Frédéric Bégin
- Production company: GO Films
- Distributed by: Les Films Seville, Entertainment One
- Release date: August 4, 2014 (Fantasia International Film Festival)
- Running time: 110 minutes
- Country: Canada
- Language: French
- Budget: CA$4.625 million

1987 is a 2014 French Canadian film that is a autobiography of the film's director, Ricardo Trogi starring Jean-Carl Boucher as Ricardo Trogi and Sandrine Bisson as Claudette Trogi. It is the sequel to the movie 1981, which came out in 2009. The movie puts emphasis on Trogi's teen years, when he was experiencing family problems and discovering his sexual identity. It also demonstrates the life of second-generation migrants.

A third film in the series, 1991, was released in 2018.

== Plot ==
In 1987, seventeen-year-old Ricardo (Jean-Carl Boucher) faces the usual teenage problems, such as having a crush on a classmate named Sarah despite already having a girlfriend named Marie-Josée and having a car. With his three friends, he goes to parties and gets drunk. When they fail to enter a bar after graduation, Ricardo wants to open one for underage teens. However, when he meets a bank manager for a loan, he discovers that he needs a job and be 18 years old to have a loan. Soon after, his dad finds him a job in the Italian restaurant he works at as a parking valet.

On his first night of work, when he was supposed to have sex with Marie-Josée and lose his virginity, Ricardo breaks a BMW, putting the damage and repairs on the restaurant's budget, and is immediately fired; an argument with his father causes the latter to start making wine illegally. One night, Ricardo and his friends find an expensive radio in a car and they steal it to gain money, and they become thieves. After being able to enter the bar, Ricardo gets unwillingly closer to Sarah.

On his prom day, Ricardo learns that Marie-Josée had an affair with a man in the bar Ricardo always tries to go to, and they break up; he also learns his project of bar got made in a nearby region, and one of his friends has been drafted in the QMJHL.

To get revenge on Marie-Josée, Ricardo has a date with Sarah, and it goes awry when Sarah announces her homosexuality. Ricardo finds Dallaire, one of his friends, with Marie-Josée. Waiting at Marie-Josée’s house, Ricardo gets drunk on his father's wine and is arrested by the police after the officer finds the stolen radios, and Ricardo tries to flee. Thinking Dallaire tricked Ricardo to get a date with Marie-Josée, Ricardo blames Dallaire for the stolen radios.

The next morning, an argument occurs with his parents over Ricardo's activities and his father's illegal business. The argument is interrupted when Ricardo's sister announces Marie-Josée has called. Ricardo then takes a bike and cycles three hours to Trois-Rivières, 136 kilometres (85 miles) to have sex with Marie-Josée.

It is later revealed that the relationship has ended after three years, and Ricardo never saw Dallaire again.

== Cast ==
- Jean-Carl Boucher : Ricardo Trogi
- Sandrine Bisson : Claudette Trogi
- Claudio Colangelo : Benito Trogi
- Rose Adam : Nadia Trogi
- Laurent-Christophe De Ruelle : Boivin
- Pier-Luc Funk : Dallaire
- Simon Pigeon : Caron
- Éléonore Lamothe : Marie-Josée
- Alyssa Labelle : Sara Delorme
- Jean-Pierre Bergeron : Prime Minister Of Quebec
- Rémi-Pierre Paquin : Manager of the Restaurant

== Soundtrack ==
1. "Cum On Feel the Noize" - Performed by Quiet Riot
1. "Ce soir l'amour est dans tes yeux" - Performed by Martine St-Clair
2. "Forever Young" - Performed by Alphaville
3. "Lavender" - Performed by Marillion
4. "Space Age Love Song" - Performed by A Flock of Seagulls
5. "It's Like That" - Performed by Run-D.M.C.
6. "It's a sin" - Performed by Pet Shop Boys
7. "Everytime I See Your Picture" - Performed by Luba
8. "I canto degli Italiani" - Written by Groffredo Mameli & Michele Novaro
9. "The Ride of the Valkyries" - Performed by Wiener Philharmoniker

== Reception ==
The film was met with positive reviews from local Montreal journals.

== Release ==
The film was released in theaters in the summer of 2014 and released on DVD, Blu-ray, and limited edition VHS in December 2014.
