= Aller Simple =

Canadian 2022 TV murder mystery

- Also known as: No Return
- Genre: Murder mystery
- Written by: Bernard Dansereau; Annie Piérard; Étienne Piérard-Dansereau
- Directed by: Yan Lanouette Turgeon, Rafaël Ouellet
- Starring: Anick Lemay; Jean-Nicolas Verreault
- Music by: Michel Corriveau
- Country of origin: Canada
- Original languages: French, English
- No. of seasons: 2
- No. of episodes: 12

Production
- Running time: 44 min
- Production company: Sphere Media

Original release
- Network: Noovo
- Release: January 12, 2022

Aller Simple (English: One-way) or No Return is a French Canadian television murder mystery series, which was broadcast from January 12, 2022.

== Description ==
The first season of six episodes was directed by Yan Lanouette Turgeon, with writers Bernard Dansereau, Annie Piérard and Étienne Piérard-Dansereau. The second season, Aller Simple – Survivre (English: One-way – Survival) also with six episodes, was broadcast from September 13, 2023, and was directed by Rafaël Ouellet, while Dansereau, Piérard and Piérard-Dansereau returned as writers. Season one follows seven passengers, who are invited to travel by helicopter to a French-Canadian billionaire's home. En route the helicopter experiences problems and the pilot sets down in a woodland. Nearby is a cottage, where the passengers stay while the pilot attends to the 'copter and its damaged radio. Next morning one of the passengers is dead. Both seasons of Aller Simple stars Anick Lemay as detective Juliette Michaud and Jean-Nicolas Verreault as Thomas Rouclair, her wheelchair-using husband. In the second season, celebrity actress Ariane (Rosalie Bonenfant) accidentally kills her stalker on a hobby farm. Ariane's tenant-friends conspire to hide the corpse and other evidence. Juliette and Thomas live in a neighbouring house.

== Cast and characters ==
- Anick Lemay as Juliette Michaud: police detective. Later lives at Gobeil's aunt's house
- Jean-Nicolas Verreault as Thomas Rouclair: Juliette's husband, wheelchair-using, former fraud investigator, jailed for drink driving
- Jules Philip as Lieutenant Gobeil: Juliette's boss
- Métushalème Dary as Joëlle Lacombe: police detective, Juliette's assistant
- Dominick Rustam-Chartrand as David: police assistant

=== Season one only ===
- Luc Picard as Denis Théberge: retired university professor, Ethics lecturer
- Caroline Dhavernas as Julie Sicotte: business woman
- Marc Beaupré as Guillaume Frenet: helicopter pilot, Robert's employee
- Rémi-Pierre Paquin as Pierre-Luc Jodoin: art dealer, Manuela's lover
- Nathalie Doummar as Manuela Farouk: engineer, Pierre's personal assistant, clandestine mistress
- Samian as Éli Mandokan: retired police detective, security consultant
- Anie Pascale as Anne-Renée Lanctôt: former advertising agent, recovering alcoholic
- Éric Bruneau as Éric Dubois: Véronique's husband; unscrupulous, high-price defence lawyer.
- Sasha Migliarese as Amélie: police IT support
- Vlad Alexis as Félix: police IT assistant
- Karine Lagueux as Myriam Ladouceur: Pierre's wife
- Madi Chirara as Me. Marois: lawyer's assistant, works for Éric
- Lamia Benhacine as Nancy: lawyer's assistant, works with Marois
- Carla Turcotte as Cassandra Vanderski: prostitute, Denis' neighbour
- Germain Houde as Robert Beaulac: Samuel's father, billionaire, people given false invitations to his home
- Alex Bisping as Thibaud Gagné: police detective
- Mélanie Dumais as Enqêteure: Guillaume's wife

=== Season two only ===
- Sophie Nélisse as Fanny Lori: hobby farm tenant, Sacha's girlfriend
- Anglesh Major as Sacha Louis: hobby farm tenant, Fanny's boyfriend
- Rose-Marie Perreault as Kim Bréseault: lawyer, hobby farm tenant, Yasmina's girlfriend
- Nahéma Ricci as Yasmina Kassar: hobby farm tenant, Kim's girlfriend
- Simon Landry-Desy as Félix Tremblay: hobby farm tenant, IT expert
- Rosalie Bonenfant as Ariane Duclos: popular actress, owns hobby farm
- Charles-Aubey Houde as Henri Vallier: hobby farm tenant
- Isabeau Blanche as Sophie: Martin's girlfriend
- Olivier Gervais-Courchesne as Martin Marchand: Xavier's brother, Sophie's boyfriend
- Antoine Olivier Pilon as Xavier Marchand: Martin's brother, Ariane's stalker, poses as film location scout
- Stéphane F. Jacques as Lex Luthor: hobby farmers' customer, drug dealer
- Camille Vincent as Sarah: Félix' sister
- Grégory Beaudin as Nic: role play gamer, Xavier's friend
- Evan Amyot Pynes as Hulk: role play gamer, Xavier's friend
- Monique Gosselin as Manon: Félix' aunt

== Episode guide ==
=== Season one ===
No. overall	No. in season	Title	Directed by	Written by	Original release date
1	1	"Falling" (Tomber)	Yan Lanouette Turgeon	Bernard Dansereau, Annie Piérard, Étienne Piérard-Dansereau	January 12, 2022
Helicopter at an airstrip. Guillaume checks in passengers, Anne, Éli, Denis, Éric, Julie, Pierre and Manuela. Guillaume challenges uninvited Manuela but Pierre insists. Pierre lies to Myriam: dining with Robert. Citing unfavourable winds, Guillaume takes them east instead of west. Helicopter shudders; Guillaume: controls unresponsive. He land in woodland clearing. Guillaume: radio damaged. Mobiles: no reception. Marois unable to reach Éric. Denis alerts group: nearby cottage; all passengers trek there. Beaulac's butler: house renovations, Robert not here. Éli berates Éric for defending mafia boss. Guillaume sabotages helicopter's radio: removes capacitor. Éric discovers drink cans, Dstroy. Anne refuses to drink, goes to bedroom. Underneath bed are Dstroy cans. Other passengers eat dinner; most denigrate Éric's unscrupulous attitude. Guillaume enters: radio broken. Éli vents against Éric; then goes to bedroom. Denis sees Anne's passed out, drunk. Denis kisses Anne. Éric describes rapist's acquittal due to poor police procedure; rapist later murdered two women. Pierre to Manuela: not told Myriam about affair. Although tempted, Julie reconsiders seducing Éric. Marois reports Éric missing to Juliette. Next morning, Anne vomits outside. Pierre makes coffee. Manuela finds Éric's phone outside. Éric's bed's unslept. Butler to Juliette: calls asking for Éric and Pierre. Passengers discover Éric's corpse.
2	2	"Spying" (Épier)	Yan Lanouette Turgeon	Bernard Dansereau, Annie Piérard, Étienne Piérard-Dansereau	January 19, 2022
Passengers believe Éric died by accidentally falling from tree. Éli takes photos with his mobile. Juliette interviews Myriam, who provides invitation letters. Juliette: no guests at Beaulac's. Annie rages, empties Dstroy cans. Flashback: Annie and two men devise Dstroy: sweetened, caffeinated, high alcohol content. Annie's advertising targets underage drinkers. Present: Nancy, Marois: do not know Pierre. Juliette to Gobeil: Éric, Pierre kidnapped, no ransoms. Thibaud: found Éric's car. Annie: details five Dstroy–related deaths. Passengers sympathetic, but Annie's distraught. At airstrip, no authorised flights, Pierre's car. Guillaume unofficially used airstrip. Guillaume writes in notebook. Pierre cautions Manuela: keep affair private. Some passengers suspect Guillaume of stranding them. Passengers create SOS sign. Juliette interviews Enqêteure, who cannot contact Guillaume; employer not known. Annie finds camera behind mirror. Men bring Éric inside: prevent animals feeding. Manuela to Gullaume: capacitor missing. Juliette: Enqêteure bought expensive vehicle. Five passengers eat meal, discus ethics, culpability. Denis finds Anne's corpse; apparent overdose. Eli collects his gun, mobile. Nancy: Éric's confession video on social media shows edited cottage footage of Éric justifying legal defence strategies for vile, rich clients. Marois alerts Juliette. Juliette: more videos to follow. Julie and Éli wonder why no help has arrived.
3	3	"Betray" (Trahir)	Yan Lanouette Turgeon	Bernard Dansereau, Annie Piérard, Étienne Piérard-Dansereau	January 26, 2022
Éli checks his gun, knocks on Guillaume's door – he's gone. Robert does not recognise Guillaume. Guillaume contacts Enqêteure via satellite phone. Éli holds Guillaume at gunpoint, for questioning. Guillaume: helicopter too large, controls unresponsive. David researches Guillaume. Joëlle: no sign of helicopter. Denis suggests they walk out; others decide to remain. Juliette learns Pierre accompanied by his pregnant mistress: Manuela. Juliette: second video features Annie as Dstroy's advertiser. Passengers move Annie's corpse, downstairs. Manuela notices Pierre's stolen artwork from Annie's room. Juliette asks Myriam about Pierre's business. Manuela realises Pierre would never leave Myriam. Myriam: Pierre cheaply bought artworks from nuns, who had no idea of their worth. Denis leaves with backpack. Amélie: video creator uses hidden website. Éli and Pierre prepare firewood. Pierre drinks root beer. Manuela moves out of Pierre's room. Gobeil: HQ want statement clearing Robert. Juliette asks Robert why he paid Guillaume $500,000. Julie and Manuela look for missing Denis. Robert explains his son Sammuel donated to Guillaume for his son's medical treatments. Robert: Samuel's humanitarian, travels incognito. Nancy claims Guillaume's money helped her son. Nancy updates Guillaume on police investigation. Pierre's ill, vomiting in toilet. Éli to Julie, Manuela: Pierre's poisoned. Guillaume leaves note for kidnapper.
4	4	"Escaping" (Fuir)	Yan Lanouette Turgeon	Bernard Dansereau, Annie Piérard, Étienne Piérard-Dansereau	February 2, 2022
Éli leaves cottage, checks tree where Éric died. Julie, Manuela look after Pierre, who is getting sicker. Guillaume checks note: no response. Éli to Manuela: tree too difficult to climb. Thomas follows Juliette's case online. Thibaud: Guillaume deposited money offshore. Éli reads Denis' letter to Cassandra. Samuel: in Africa; not Guillaume's friend. Gobeil: prepare press statement dissociating Robert from kidnapping. Juliette deduces Samuel lied. Returning Denis: worn-out, limping; discovered swamps, no cabins, no trails. Denis: Cassandra was his student, lover. Felix: third video: details Pierre's schemes. Thomas: Éli investigated organised crime. Thomas: online speculation by "Marika": policeman's next. Guillaume hides knife. Amélie: trawls for "Marika". Corpses moved into shed. Manuela: Éric had no tree resin, hence murdered. Julie asks Denis to distract Guillaume, outside. Éli, Manuela find radio's conductor in Guillaume's room. Éli reads Guillaume's notebook, has rehearsed speeches. Guillaume threatens Denis with knife. "Marika" describes Denis' ethics case studies, which match videos. Denis had hired Guillaume, ran off. Denis tasers Guillaume and kills him. Éli approaches, Denis claims Guillaume attacked him. Denis plays victim, blaming murders on Guillaume. Remaining passengers congregate in main room, while Denis watches. When they sleep, Denis takes Éli's gun, leaves. Soon gunshots are fired.
5	5	"Correcting" (Corriger)	Yan Lanouette Turgeon	Bernard Dansereau, Annie Piérard, Étienne Piérard-Dansereau	February 9, 2022
Flashback: Denis challenges ethics of social media, political correctness. Present: Denis shoots gun; claims Guillaume ran past. Thomas breached parole upon leaving house. Joëlle: Éli's informant killed to catch criminal. Denis drugs Éli's coffee; leaves cottage. Denis shoots Guillaume's corpse. Thibaud: Denis untraceable since selling his house. Denis washes bloodied arm. Éli follows blood trail. Enqêteure: Guillaume used satellite phone; took Denis on flights. Denis lived at motel. Passengers surround Guillaume's corpse. Manuela's surprised by Denis' accurate shooting. Inside cabin, Denis checks online; loads shotgun with special cartridge. Éli: captured gangster, using informants. Denis poisons Pierre's drink. Manuela cares for Pierre. Denis begins making Éli's video. Student's video: Denis defends sexual predators; blames females' clothing. Social media pillories Denis. Flashback: Denis rails against university leaders; he's sacked. Present: Amélie: Samuel's in Vietnam. Another missing person: Julie. Joëlle: Denis was Cassandra's client. Éli: when gangster suspected informant, Éli removed him. However, Éli's boss returned informant, blamed Éli after informant was killed. Manuela finds Denis' shotgun. Forensic analyst: Denis used arsenic; made special shotgun cartridge, which self-explodes. Denis misjudged Éli's ethical behaviour. Denis swaps special cartridge with standard issue. Juliette provides Thomas' alibi. Upon leaving his cabin, Denis encounters Éli with shotgun.
6	6	"Dying" (Mourir)	Yan Lanouette Turgeon	Bernard Dansereau, Annie Piérard, Étienne Piérard-Dansereau	February 16, 2022
Denis: just found cabin; asks Éli to enter. Éli leaves shotgun outside; realises Denis' lying. At gunpoint, Éli forces Denis to activate computer. When distracted by CCTV showing Manuela, Denis shoots Éli's leg. Manuela: Pierre's not breathing. Guillaume's video: transported paedophile victims to Samuel. Denis returns to cottage; Pierre's died. Éli's tied up. Cassandra: Denis wants to teach ethics to ordinary people; took computer classes; learnt Cassandra was Samuel's victim. Denis deliberately turns up gas, saves Manuela, Julie. Juliette confronts Robert: where did Guillaume deliver Samuel's victims? Robert provides cottage's location. Denis to Éli: used social media to air ethical debates. Manuela discovers Denis not listed as passenger. Manuela, Julie want to leave; Denis reassures them by handing over shotgun. Éli cuts ties, retrieves his gun. Amélie: Denis' live streaming. Joëlle: rescue helicopters 14 minutes away. Denis: Julie responsible for Bangladesh factory collapse. Julie, Manuela stand to leave. Denis takes out gun; order them to sit. Bangladesh owners were jailed, no trial for Julie. Julie triggers explosive shotgun: loses her head. Denis provokes Manuela, who stabs him. Police arrive; Denis survives. Year later Thomas released from home detention. From prison, Denis phones Juliette: American TV series want to interview you.

=== Season two ===
No. overall	No. in season	Title	Directed by	Written by	Original release date
7	1	"Obsession" (Adorer)	Rafaël Ouellet	Annie Piérard, Bernard Dansereau, Étienne Piérard-Dansereau	September 13, 2023
Thomas spies on neighbours. Xavier fakes being ill, leaves work. Ariane on radio: purchased eco-friendly farm. Xavier punctures Ariane's car tyre to meet her. Xavier: scouting farms for American film. Thomas photographs Ariane introducing Xavier to tenants. Ariane, Xavier tour farm as tenants consider his offer. Ariane films dead hen. Sacha objects to Ariane using his rifle to kill fox. Xavier snoops Ariane's room. Juliette's working on car thefts. Xavier installs bathroom camera; views Ariane stripping. Juliette, Thomas dine with Gobeil. Martin phones Xavier; no answer. Juliette, Thomas notice Ariane's and Martin's cars. Thomas to Juliette: Ariane no longer posting on social media. Martin to Sophie: Xavier's too busy to meet. They find Ariane's panties in Martin's car. Tenants worried: no response from Ariane. Martin learns that Xavier quit. Thomas to Martin: Xavier visited farm. Sacha: Xavier wanted to rent farm; Martin leaves. Flashback: Xavier returns, drinks with tenants. Later, Ariane collects rifle to hunt fox. Xavier follows, masturbates near Ariane. She hears noise, shoots rifle: Xavier's dead. Male tenants and Yasmina decide to bury Xavier's corpse. After reading Martin's message, Felix drives Xavier's car to Martin's place. Present: Yasmina, men describe events to Kim, Fanny. Ariane returns to farm.
8	2	"Regret" (Regretter)	Rafaël Ouellet	Annie Piérard, Bernard Dansereau, Étienne Piérard-Dansereau	September 20, 2023
Ariane, acting for film, freezes when required to shoot gun. Ariane's agent, Sandrine: your character kills immediately. Tenants find Xavier's cameras. Félix answers Xavier's phone messages, while travelling. Tenants search Xavier's corpse. Xavier's friends: not seen him since weekend. Ariane asks technician for ecstasy. Using Xavier's keys, Félix and Sacha enter Xavier's flat. Félix hacks into Xavier's computer, Sacha collects Xavier's clothes. When Martin arrives, they flee. Martin notices Xavier's not taken medications. Fanny reassures Kim: Félix' dealing with Xavier. Félix returns home, greets Sarah. Sandrine visits Ariane: why freeze during filming? Ariane starts answering, but Henri interrupts. Ariane: share ecstasy; tenants: keep low profile. Suspecting hidden devices, Sacha puts up "quiet" signs. Nic to Martin: Xavier's not collected game cards; Xavier's stalking Ariane. Martin sees farm on Ariane's socials. Ariane runs past Juliette, Thomas. Martin stops car, tries explaining Xavier's infatuation to Ariane. Ariane staggers. Martin takes Ariane to farm. Martin leaves. Félix: pretend Xavier's on road trip to Niagara Falls. Ambulance picks up Ariane; she's overdosed. Juliette, Thomas ask tenants about Ariane. Fanny: Ariane took contaminated drug, Martin's their friend. Thomas: they are lying; Martin's no friend. Ariane dies. Félix takes Sarah to Niagara. Technician: only sold ecstasy.
9	3	"Honour" (Honorer)	Rafaël Ouellet	Annie Piérard, Bernard Dansereau, Étienne Piérard-Dansereau	September 27, 2023
Police leave farm after interviewing tenants. Martin views Xavier's Niagara photos. Sophie: Ariane's dead. Henri's girlfriend wants to visit. Ariane's mother: annoyed by tenants' neglecting Ariane. Thomas spots Martin's number plate; uses Juliette's computer to search details. Félix copies Xavier's phone; leaves original. Félix brings Sarah home. Martin to Thomas: met Ariane, once. Félix-as-Xavier: messages Martin. Manon cares for Sarah. Sacha buys drugs from Lex. Louis interviews Félix, Henri. They reveal she died of overdose. Yasmina feeds Xavier's cat, meets Xavier's landlord. Félix convinces Martin: Xavier did not kill Ariane. Tenants hold Ariane's memorial. Martin attends, wondering whether Xavier will appear. Martin overhears Sarah mention Niagara to Sandrine. Martin vigorously questions Sarah. Sacha pushes Martin away, warns he will report Martin to police. Before he does, police arrive: technician sold ecstasy, but Ariane had another drug. Police enter Ariane's room: Fanny's cleaned it for baby; moved Ariane's goods into shed. Police show dealers' photos to tenants. Sacha recognises one, but keeps quiet. Sacha drops Fanny at her mother's home. Martin pays landlord, who recalls Yasmina. Martin phones Xavier: he's calling police. Félix warns tenants. Martin's found dead. Gobeil asks Juliette why she researched Martin's number plates. Félix learns Martin's dead.
10	4	"Resurrection" (Ressusciter)	Rafaël Ouellet	Annie Piérard, Bernard Dansereau, Étienne Piérard-Dansereau	October 4, 2023
Juliette joins Joëlle's investigation into Martin's death: killed by golf club. Félix-as-Xavier replies to calls. Félix discovers Xavier's online gaming, records speech samples. Henri asks his mother to alibi him. Flashback: Henri's girlfriend, Magalie wants to move in. Henri ashamed that Ariane told tenants of his impotence. Present: Power shorts out in farmhouse. Félix, Yasmina ask to use Thomas' Internet. Sacha pays Rex: fix powerboard. Thomas notices Félix viewing Nic's website. Juliette castigates Thomas for using her password. Yasmina finds Thomas' photo: meeting Xavier. Juliette believes Thomas becoming paranoid. Police ask tenants how Ariane had benzodiazepine in bloodstream. Thomas views online video: Xavier gaming with Nic. Kim to Yasmina: gave Ariane benzodiazepine. Flashback: Kim gives Ariane tea with pills to prevent her leaving. Present: Thomas: more secretive. Félix fakes conversations with Xavier's relatives. Kim provides Thomas with minimal answers about Martin. Inside Thomas house, someone discovers police files. Thomas asks Nic for Xavier's number. Thomas poses as Ariane's friend, phones Xavier; Yasmina realises it's Thomas. Félix-as-Xavier phones Sophie. Juliette arrives home; Thomas' gone. Sophie reads Martin's last message. Tenants to Juliette: saw Thomas at noon, invited him to dinner, but no show. Tenants realise one of them killed Martin.
11	5	"Acceptance" (Assumer)	Rafaël Ouellet	Annie Piérard, Bernard Dansereau, Étienne Piérard-Dansereau	October 11, 2023
Flashback: Ariane convinces tenants to buy farm. Present: Tenants argue about splitting up. Gobeil has not heard from Thomas. Tenants decide to create believable story. Juliette searches Thomas' photos. Henri breaks up with Magalie. Juliette to Fanny: Thomas texted me. Joëlle, David sift through Martin's evidence; initially suspect a junkie. Kim rehearses fellow tenants for police questioning. Nic to Juliette: Thomas asking about Xavier. Flashback: Sacha visits biker, Mikaël for information. Present: Gobeil resists tracking Thomas' phone. Fanny believes Sacha's hiding something. Junkie to Joëlle: found Martin's stuff. David: junkie's alibi confirmed. Juliette to Joëlle: robbery staged, killer knew Martin. Félix: police want Xavier. Joëlle consults tenants. Félix: met Martin, who was looking for Xavier. Juliette searches farmhouse, discovers crowbar under pillow. Juliette to Joëlle: tenants hiding something. Hulk to Nic: see Xavier's suicidal posts. Félix-as-Xavier: phones Sophie; tells her he killed Martin, faked being in Niagara. Police arrive in Niagara flat. Sophie phones Joëlle: spoke to Xavier. Henri's mother phones Félix. Tenants confront Henri: visited sex therapist. Policeman to Juliette: Ariane died of designer drug; he lists suspects including Mikaël. Félix places phone in jacket, dumps jacket in riverside debris. Henri phones emergency: reports suicide. Sacha visits Thomas, bound inside bunker.
12	6	"Sacrifice" (Sacrifieer)	Rafaël Ouellet	Annie Piérard, Bernard Dansereau, Étienne Piérard-Dansereau	October 18, 2023
Flashback: Ariane's farm: organic, self-sufficient. Sacha requests bunker. Present: Sacha gives Thomas pills. Fanny sees Sacha leaving bunker. Fanny killed Ariane, Martin. Flashback: Sacha asks Mikaël what he sold Fanny. Present: Sophie to Juliette: never met Xavier. Joëlle: Xavier suicided? Juliette: no body, no suicide. Juliette reprints Thomas' photos. Sacha prevents Fanny from poisoning Thomas. Juliette sees tenants packing up. Fanny splashes chicken blood on Sacha's jacket. Félix watches Fanny burning jacket. Gobeil cautions Juliette: wait for authorisation before searching farm. Félix warns tenants: Sacha had bloodied clothes. Juliette accesses farm. In barn, Fanny stabs own thigh; asks Sacha to remove knife. Fanny kills Sacha with knife. As Juliette enters, Fanny feigns that Sacha attacked her. Police discover killer drugs on Sacha. Fanny: Ariane killed Xavier; other tenants covered it up. Fanny lies: Sacha gave Ariane drugs; Sacha killed Martin. Thomas tries breaking out. Forensics find Xavier's corpse. Fanny steals man's car keys, leaves hospital. Juliette researches tenants' bunker. Fanny arrives at bunker, connects car exhaust to air inlet. Juliette interviews Lex: built bunker. Fanny drives away. Lex: bunker locked from inside. Thomas' fainted but revives to unlock door. Police arrest Fanny. Juliette, Thomas invite Gobeil to their condominium.
