= Villeneuve: The Rise of a Legend =

2026 film by Yan Lanouette Turgeon

- French: Villeneuve : l'ascension d'une légende
- Directed by: Yan Lanouette Turgeon
- Written by: Daniel Roby; Guillaume Lonergan
- Produced by: Christian Larouche
- Starring: Rémi Goulet; Rosalie Bonenfant; Patrice Robitaille
- Edited by: Yvann Thibaudeau
- Music by: Philippe Brault
- Production company: Christal Films
- Distributed by: Les Films Opale
- Release date: September 19, 2026 (TIFF)
- Country: Canada
- Languages: French; English

Villeneuve: The Rise of a Legend (French: Villeneuve : l'ascension d'une légende) is a Canadian biographical drama film, directed by Yan Lanouette Turgeon and released in 2026. A dramatization of the early life of Canadian racing driver Gilles Villeneuve, the film centres on his early efforts to establish his racing career.

The film stars Rémi Goulet as Villeneuve and Rosalie Bonenfant as his wife Joann Barthe, as well as Patrice Robitaille, Anick Lemay, Fabien Cloutier, Hubert Proulx, Étienne Galloy and Frank Crudele as Enzo Ferrari in supporting roles.

== Production ==
The film's production was first announced in 2023, with screenwriter Daniel Roby slated to direct it. Due to disagreements with producer Christian Larouche over the film's creative direction, he was dropped from the project in fall 2024, with Turgeon brought in to replace him.

Around the same time the film had to pause production for budgetary reasons, before resuming production in summer 2025.

== Release ==
The film premiered as the closing film of the 2026 Toronto International Film Festival, and was screened as the opening film of the 2026 Abitibi-Témiscamingue International Film Festival.

It will go into commercial release in Quebec on November 11.
