= Major Junior (film) =

- Film poster
- French: Junior Majeur
- Directed by: Éric Tessier
- Written by: Martin Bouchard; Emmanuel Joly
- Produced by: Christian Larouche
- Starring: Antoine Olivier Pilon; Rémi Goulet; Alice Morel-Michaud
- Cinematography: Tobie Marier Robitaille
- Edited by: Alain Baril
- Music by: Christian Clermont
- Production company: Christal Films
- Distributed by: Les Films Séville
- Release date: October 28, 2017 (Abitibi-Témiscamingue)
- Running time: 115 minutes
- Country: Canada
- Language: French

Major Junior (French: Junior Majeur) is a Canadian sports drama film, directed by Éric Tessier and released in 2017. A sequel to the 2012 film The Pee-Wee 3D: The Winter That Changed My Life (Les Pee-Wee 3d: L'hiver qui a changé ma vie), the film centres on Janeau Trudel (Antoine Olivier Pilon) and Joey Boulet (Rémi Goulet), who are now playing for the Chicoutimi Saguenéens of the Quebec Major Junior Hockey League and hopeful of getting chosen in the NHL entry draft, while Julie (Alice Morel-Michaud) has given up on hockey due to the reduced opportunities for female players at the higher levels of the sport, and is now a junior sports reporter with the local newspaper.

The film's cast also includes Normand Daneau, Claude Legault, Patrice Robitaille, Madeleine Péloquin and Edith Cochrane.

The film premiered at the Abitibi-Témiscamingue International Film Festival on October 28, 2017, before opening commercially on November 23.

The film won the Public Prize at the 20th Quebec Cinema Awards.

== Plot ==
Five years after winning the Tournoi Pee-Wee de Québec, Janeau Trudel plays for Team Canada at the World Junior Hockey Championship in Saint-Petersburg Russia. They take part in the final, where they lose against the Russian National Team, led by Yuri Karpov. Trudel goes back to Chicoutimi to resume his hockey season with the Chicoutimi Saguenéens. He is celebrated at a local bar, where he reconnects with Julie and Joey Boulet, his teammate and best friend.

After partying all night, Janeau takes the wheel of Joey's pickup truck. While checking his cell phone, he loses control of the truck. After being spotted by two police officers, he switches seats with Joey, who had fallen asleep, giving the impression that Joey was drunk and had fallen asleep behind the wheel. They are both taken back to their pension house, without any repercussions.

Janeau is back on the ice with the Saguenéens, but the team performs poorly, forcing the owner of the club to fire their head coach, and replace him with Stéphane Côté, Janeau and Joey's former coach at the Pee-Wee level. Janeau also slides down to second in the rankings for the next professional draft, behind Karpov.

Julie has an internship with Louis Drouin, one of the biggest journalists in Chicoutimi. Drouin learns about the story of Trudel and Boulet being arrested without any repercussions, prompting Joey to reveal that he was behind the wheel that night, not knowing that it was actually Janeau who was behind the wheel. The Saguenéens, as a result, trade Joey to the Rouyn-Noranda Huskies the day after. Before he leaves, the owner of the team tells Joey to get rid of his alcoholic father as his agent.

Joey's father Luke rents a house in Rouyn to live with his son. They make a deal to not drink alcohol anymore. Joey is also approached by Nathalie Leblanc, the director of player services of the league, to talk about his drinking problem. Feeling guilty that Joey was traded to the Huskies because of him, Janeau develops feelings for Julie, and they eventually start a relationship. Janeau is named captain of the team, and they embark on a winning streak. Julie soon learns from the school janitor that Janeau was actually behind the wheel of the truck on the night of the arrest, having seen them leave the bar that night. Angry, Julie confronts Janeau with the information, and breaks up with him.

Julie writes an article revealing the truth of what actually happened, but decides to call Joey instead to tell him the truth, leaving Joey devastated. Janeau decides to take his car and drive to Drummondville to tell the truth to Joey, but by the time he gets there, it is already too late. Janeau decides to record a video where he tells the truth about what happened that night. He then finishes the season with 39 points in 12 games, polishing his stock for the Draft.

The Huskies and the Saguenéens meet in the first round of the QMJHL playoffs. Fueled by the situation with Joey and Janeau, the first game proves to be an intense one, culminating in Joey making a knee-to-knee hit on Janeau, sidelining him for the rest of the playoffs. Joey also misses the rest of the playoffs, as he gets suspended. He announces the news to his drunk father, who shows no remorse about what happened, arguing that Janeau had it coming. Angry, Joey packs his bags and leaves his father's house.

A few months later, at the Draft, Karpov gets drafted first by Buffalo, leaving Janeau disappointed. However, a few moments later, Montreal trades to get the second overall pick, and selects Janeau. Later on in the draft, Joey gets drafted in the seventh round by Philadelphia. He forgives his father, who made it to the draft.

Janeau's family organizes a surprise party to celebrate Janeau's accomplishment. He tries to reconnect with Julie, still having feelings for her, but she tells him that she is going to study in France. He later goes to the local arena to skate, where he sees Joey, also skating. After skating around, they start passing the puck to each other.

== See also ==
- List of films about ice hockey
