= The Pee-Wee 3D: The Winter That Changed My Life =

- Film poster
- French: Les Pee-Wee 3d: L'hiver qui a changé ma vie
- Directed by: Éric Tessier
- Written by: Martin Bouchard; Emmanuel Joly; Jean-Sébastien Poirier
- Produced by: Christian Larouche
- Starring: Antoine Olivier Pilon; Rémi Goulet; Alice Morel-Michaud; Guy Nadon; Julie Le Breton; Claude Legault
- Cinematography: Bernard Couture
- Edited by: Alain Baril
- Music by: Christian Clermont
- Production company: Christal Films
- Release date: December 21, 2012
- Running time: 122 minutes
- Country: Canada
- Language: French

The Pee-Wee 3D: The Winter That Changed My Life (French: Les Pee-Wee 3d: L'hiver qui a changé ma vie) is a Canadian comedy-drama sports film, directed by Éric Tessier and released in 2012. The film centers on the Lynx, a junior hockey team in Mont-Saint-Hilaire, Quebec, who are preparing for their league's top tournament.

The film's cast includes Antoine Olivier Pilon, Rémi Goulet, Alice Morel-Michaud, Julie Le Breton, Guy Nadon, Normand Daneau and Claude Legault. Morel-Michaud received a Canadian Screen Award nomination for Best Supporting Actress at the 1st Canadian Screen Awards, and Nadon received a Prix Jutra nomination for Best Supporting Actor at the 15th Prix Jutra.

A sequel film, Major Junior (Junior Majeur), was released in 2017.

== Plot ==
Janeau and his father move out of Ottawa to restart their lives following the death of his mother. Despite his high skills at hockey, Janeau barely practices anymore to grieve. While practicing, new neighbour Julie notices his skills, and the two become friends. Julie later persuades Janeau to join her local hockey team to qualify to the tournament. However, Janeau's skills irritate team member Joey, the popular captain under pressure by his father.

While practising, Joey arrogantly insults Janeau's mother, causing the two to fight. During a game, Joey reveals to the opposite team Janeau's injury. Julie is knocked out and suffers a concussion, causing Janeau to fight enough to be eliminated. Joey steals the puck, passes to a teammate, and the Lynx win the game. Despite apologising, Joey is exposed by Janeau from the injury's exposure, leading to Joey being outcast.

On their way to the finals, Janeau and Joey make amends. Julie fakes her medical results to assist at the finals, but is too scared to play. Janeau and Joey help each other and win the tournament, with Janeau making amends with his father and accepting his mother's death, and celebrates with his team.

== See also ==
- List of films about ice hockey
