= You Will Remember Me =

2020 Canadian film

- Film poster
- French: Tu te souviendras de moi
- Directed by: Éric Tessier
- Written by: Éric Tessier
- Based on: Tu te souviendras de moi by François Archambault
- Produced by: Christian Larouche
- Starring: Rémy Girard; France Castel; Julie Le Breton
- Cinematography: Pierre Gill
- Edited by: Jean-François Bergeron
- Music by: Martin Léon
- Production company: Christal Films
- Distributed by: Les Films Opale
- Release date: August 18, 2020 (Sarajevo)
- Running time: 108 minutes
- Country: Canada
- Language: French

You Will Remember Me (French: Tu te souviendras de moi) is a Canadian drama film, directed by Éric Tessier and released in 2020. Based on the theatrical play by François Archambault, the film stars Rémy Girard as Édouard Beauchemin, a successful academic who is beginning to suffer from the early stages of dementia.

The film's premiere, originally slated for March 20, 2020, was postponed due to the COVID-19 pandemic in Canada. The film instead premiered at the Sarajevo Film Festival in August 2020. It was selected as the opening film of the 2022 Abitibi-Témiscamingue International Film Festival, its first actual screening in Quebec due to the pandemic-related disruptions of film distribution.

== Awards ==
| Award | Date of ceremony | Category | Recipient(s) | Result | Ref(s) |
|---|---|---|---|---|---|
| Whistler Film Festival | 2020 | Best Performance, Borsos Competition | Rémy Girard | Won | |
| Canadian Screen Awards | 2022 | Best Adapted Screenplay | Éric Tessier | Nominated | |
| Canadian Screen Awards | 2022 | Best Cinematography | Pierre Gill | Nominated | |
| Abitibi-Témiscamingue International Film Festival | 2022 | Grand Prix Hydro-Québec | Éric Tessier | Won | |
| Prix Iris | December 10, 2023 | Best Supporting Actress | Julie Le Breton | Nominated | |
| Prix Iris | December 10, 2023 | Best Original Music | Martin Léon | Nominated | |
