= Love Project =

- French: Love Projet
- Directed by: Carole Laure
- Written by: Carole Laure
- Produced by: Lyse Lafontaine; François Tremblay
- Starring: Magalie Lépine-Blondeau; Benoît McGinnis; Natacha Filiatrault; Éric Robidoux
- Cinematography: Daniel Jobin
- Edited by: Sylvain Lebel; Carole Laure
- Music by: Lewis Furey
- Production company: Lyla Films
- Distributed by: Christal Films
- Release date: October 17, 2014 (FNC)
- Running time: 103 minutes
- Country: Canada
- Language: French

Love Project (French: Love Projet) is a Canadian drama film, directed by Carole Laure and released in 2014. An ensemble drama, the film focuses on the professional and personal lives of a group of young theatre professionals who are working to produce a multimedia stage play.

Its cast includes Magalie Lépine-Blondeau, Benoît McGinnis, Natacha Filiatrault, Éric Robidoux, Céline Bonnier, Tomas Furey, Victoria Diamond, Charles-William Ross, Alice Morel-Michaud, Pascale Bussières, Roger La Rue, Benoît Lachambre, Louise Bombardier, and Louise Latraverse.

The film premiered on October 17, 2014, at the Festival du nouveau cinéma.

Lewis Furey received a Canadian Screen Award nomination for Best Original Song at the 3rd Canadian Screen Awards in 2015, for the song "Road to Rainbow's End". Hairstylist Ghislaine Sant received a Jutra Award nomination for Best Hair at the 17th Jutra Awards.
