= Duo (2006 film) =

Canadian romantic comedy film

- Directed by: Richard Ciupka
- Written by: Sylvie Desrosiers; Sylvie Pilon
- Produced by: Jacques Bonin; Claude Veillet
- Starring: Anick Lemay; François Massicotte; Serge Postigo
- Cinematography: Bernard Couture
- Edited by: Arthur Tarnowski
- Music by: Robert Marchand
- Production company: Les Films Vision 4
- Distributed by: Christal Films
- Release date: 16 June 2006
- Running time: 104 minutes
- Country: Canada
- Language: French

Duo is a Canadian romantic comedy film, directed by Richard Ciupka and released in 2006. The film stars Anick Lemay as Pascale Lachance, a musical agent who is blindsided when her fiancé and star client Lewis Carl (Tim Rozon) betrays her. Setting on the idea of luring legendary singer-songwriter Francis Roy (Serge Postigo) out of retirement, she discovers that rival agent Jules Simard (François Massicotte) has the same idea, only for the two rivals to fall in love with each other as they compete for Roy's contract.

The cast also includes Gildor Roy, Julie McClemens, Sandrine Bisson, Amélie Grenier and Mario Morin. The film's soundtrack includes several songs by Quebec rock singer Stefie Shock.

The film opened in theatres on 16 July 2006. The film was not favourably received by film critics or audiences.

Arthur Tarnowski received a Jutra Award nomination for Best Editing at the 9th Jutra Awards in 2007.
