= Goodbye Happiness (film) =

2022 French Canadian film

- Film poster
- French: Au revoir le bonheur
- Directed by: Ken Scott
- Written by: Ken Scott
- Produced by: Christian Larouche
- Starring: François Arnaud; Antoine Bertrand; Louis Morissette; Patrice Robitaille
- Cinematography: Norayr Kasper
- Edited by: Yvann Thibaudeau
- Music by: Nicolas Errèra
- Production company: Christal Films
- Distributed by: Les Films Opale
- Release date: December 17, 2021
- Running time: 108 minutes
- Country: Canada
- Language: French

Goodbye Happiness (French: Au revoir le bonheur) is a French Canadian comedy-drama film, directed by Ken Scott and released in 2021. The film centres on Nicolas (François Arnaud), Thomas (Antoine Bertrand), Charles-Alexandre (Louis Morissette) and William (Patrice Robitaille), four brothers who do not get along but are attempting to set aside their differences at their father's funeral.

The cast also includes Julie Le Breton, Charlotte Aubin, Marilyse Bourke, Élizabeth Duperré, Geneviève Boivin-Roussy and Pierre-Yves Cardinal.

The film premiered in theatres on December 17, 2021.

== Awards ==
The film received two Canadian Screen Award nominations at the 10th Canadian Screen Awards in 2022, for Best Editing (Yvann Thibaudeau) and Best Original Song (Nicolas Errèra and Craig Walker for "Drop the Rock").
