= Anick Lemay =

Canadian comedian and actress

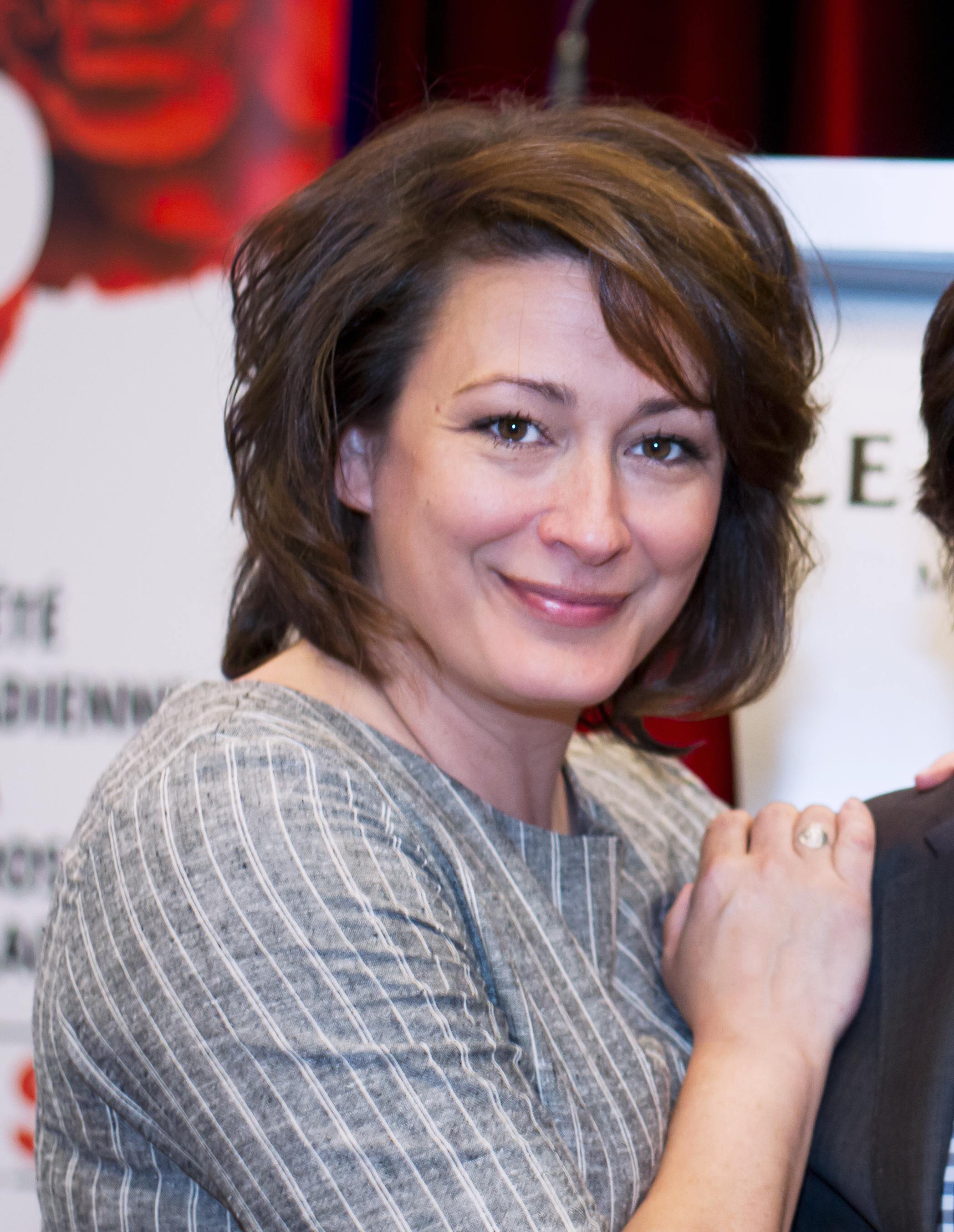
- Lemay in 2017
- Born: Thetford Mines, Quebec, Canada
- Occupations: actress, comedienne
- Years active: 1998-present
- Notable work: Frisson des collines, Cheech

Anick Lemay is a Canadian comedienne, actress and restaurateur. A majority of her work is with Quebec television and Quebec cinema. Her film credits include Sable Island (L'Île de Sable), Cheech, Thrill of the Hills (Frisson des collines), Duo, Kiss Me Like a Lover, Victoire (La Cordonnière) and Villeneuve: The Rise of a Legend (Villeneuve : l'ascension d'une légende), and the television shows François en série, Toi & Moi, Mauvais Karma and Motel Paradis (2022). She starred in the murder mystery, Aller Simple (2022–2023).

Lemay was nominated for a Jutra Award in the Best Supporting Actress category for her role in Frisson des collines.

For several years, Lemay was the public spokesperson for Uniprix pharmacy.

In 2014 Lemay opened her own restaurant in Magog, Quebec.

Lemay studied at the Conservatoire de musique et d'art dramatique du Québec. She considers actress Marie-Thérèse Fortin a mentor.
