= Éric Tessier =

Canadian film director

Éric Tessier (born March 19, 1966) is a Canadian film and television director and screenwriter from Quebec. He received a Canadian Screen Award nomination for Best Adapted Screenplay at the 10th Canadian Screen Awards in 2022, for the film You Will Remember Me (Tu te souviendras de moi).

== Filmography ==
=== Film ===
- Evil Words (Sur le seuil) - 2003
- Vendus - 2004
- 5150 Elm's Way (5150, rue des Ormes) - 2009
- The Pee-Wee 3D: The Winter That Changed My Life (Les Pee-Wee 3d: L'hiver qui a changé ma vie) - 2012
- 9 (9, le film) - 2016
- Major Junior (Junior Majeur) - 2017
- You Will Remember Me (Tu te souviendras de moi) - 2020

=== Television ===
- 3X Rien - 2003
- Rumours - 2006
- La chambre no 13 - 2006
- Sophie - 2008
- O' - 2012
- Pour Sarah - 2015
