= Yan Lanouette Turgeon =

Canadian film and television director

Yan Lanouette Turgeon is a Canadian film and television director from Quebec. He is most noted as a two-time winner of the Gémeaux Award for Best Direction in a Dramatic Series, winning in 2016 for Unité 9 and in 2017 for L'Imposteur.

He directed a number of short films before making his feature film debut with Rock Paper Scissors (Roche papier ciseaux) in 2013.

== Filmography ==
=== Film ===
- Pedigree - 2004
- Papillon noir - 2007
- Le revenant - 2010
- Rock Paper Scissors (Roche papier ciseaux) - 2013
- Miss Boots (Mlle Bottine) - 2024
- Villeneuve: The Rise of a Legend (Villeneuve : l'ascension d'une légende) - 2026

=== Television ===
- Unité 9 - 2015
- L'Imposteur - 2016–17
- Les Pays d'en haut - 2018
- Epidemic (Épidémie) - 2020
- Aller Simple - 2022
- IXE-13 et la course à l'uranium - 2024
