= Patrice Robitaille =

Canadian actor and screenwriter (born 1974)

- Born: 1974 (age 51–52); Quebec City, Quebec, Canada
- Occupation: Actor, writer
- Years active: 1990s-present

Patrice Robitaille (born 1974) is a Canadian actor and screenwriter. He is most noted as cowriter with Jean-Philippe Pearson and Ricardo Trogi of the film Québec-Montréal (2002), for which they won the Jutra Award for Best Screenplay at the 5th Jutra Awards in 2003.

He was also a Genie Award nominee for Best Original Screenplay at the 23rd Genie Awards for Québec-Montréal, and a two-time Jutra Award nominee for Best Actor for Québec-Montréal and The Little Queen (La petite reine).

== Filmography ==
Year	Film	Role	Notes
2001	The Woman Who Drinks (La Femme qui boit)	Invitée, Joueur de cartes	
2001	Tar Angel (L'Ange de goudron)	Policier	
2002	Québec-Montréal	Rob	
2004	Doux rendez-vous	Mario	
2004	Les ménés	Voisin	
2005	The Outlander (Le Survenant)	Odilon Provençal	
2005	Dodging the Clock (Horloge biologique)	Frédéric 'Fred' Gagnon	
2005	The Rocket (Maurice Richard)	Émile "Butch" Bouchard	
2005	Saint Martyrs of the Damned (Saints-Martyrs-des-Damnés)	Armand	
2006	Deliver Me (Délivrez-moi)	Ghislain	
2006	Cheech	Ron	
2008	A No-Hit No-Run Summer (Un été sans point ni coup sûr)	Charles	
2009	Sticky Fingers	Donald Quintal	
2009	Cadavres	Jos Louis	
2010	The Hair of the Beast (Le Poil de la bête)	Dutrisac	
2011	Thrill of the Hills (Frisson des collines)	Aurèle	
2014	The Little Queen (La Petite Reine)	J.P.	
2016	The 3 L'il Pigs 2 (Les 3 p'tits cochons 2)		
2017	Father and Guns 2 (De père en flic 2)		
2017	Major Junior (Junior Majeur)		
2018	When Love Digs a Hole (Quand l'amour se creuse un trou)	David, Miron's father	
2021	A Revision (Une révision)	Étienne Brasseur	Prix Iris nominee for Best Actor
2021	Goodbye Happiness (Au revoir le bonheur)	William	
2023	One Summer (Le temps d'un été)	Marc Côté	
2023	Ru		
2026	Villeneuve: The Rise of a Legend (Villeneuve : l'ascension d'une légende)		

=== Television ===
- Watatatow (1990)
- 4 et demi... (1995)
- Fortier (2001)
- La vie, la vie (2001)
- Rumeurs (2002)
- Le plateau (2002)
- Grande ourse (1 episode, 2004)
- L'héritière de grande ourse (miniseries, 2005)
- Les Bougon (1 episode, 2005)
- Miss Météo (TV film, 2005)
- Les Invincibles (2005)
- François en série (15 episodes, 2006–2007)
- Les Boys (16 episodes, 2007–2009)
- Toute la vérité (2010)
- Happily Married (C'est comme ça que je t'aime) - 2020
- Antigang - 2025
