= The Marina (film) =

2020 Canadian film directed by Christophe Levac and Étienne Galloy

- French: La Marina
- Directed by: Christophe Levac; Étienne Galloy
- Written by: Christophe Levac; Étienne Galloy
- Produced by: Nicolas Fontaine; Étienne Galloy
- Starring: Rémi Goulet; Rose-Marie Perreault
- Cinematography: Fred Gervais-Dupuis
- Production company: Main Film
- Distributed by: Les Films Opale
- Release date: August 27, 2020
- Running time: 80 minutes
- Country: Canada
- Language: French

The Marina (French: La Marina) is a Canadian comedy-drama film, directed by Christophe Levac and Étienne Galloy and released in 2020. The film stars Rémi Goulet as Charlie, a young competitive wakeboarder who has been sidelined by an injury that may prevent him from ever returning to the sport; visiting his cousin in Chambly for the summer, he is shaken out of his aimlessness when he meets and connects with Juliette (Rose-Marie Perreault), a young woman who works at the local marina.

The cast also includes Amadou Madani Tall, Anthony Therrien and Marguerite Bouchard.

The film premiered on August 27, 2020, at both the Fantasia Film Festival in Canada, and the Middlebury New Filmmakers Festival in the United States. It was subsequently screened at the Whistler Film Festival, where Fred Gervais-Dupuis won the Borsos Competition award for Best Cinematography in a Canadian Film.
