= Dans une galaxie près de chez vous =

Television series from Quebec, Canada

- Genre: Science fiction; Comedy
- Created by: Claude Legault; Pierre-Yves Bernard
- Starring: Guy Jodoin; Stephane Crête; Didier Lucien; Claude Legault; Sylvie Moreau; Mélanie Maynard; Real Bossé; Pascale Montpetit; Isabelle Brossard; Paul Ahmarani
- Country of origin: Canada
- Original language: French
- No. of seasons: 4
- No. of episodes: 65

Production
- Running time: 26 minutes

Original release
- Network: Canal Famille (1999-2000); Vrak.TV (2001)
- Release: January 25, 1999 – November 25, 2001

Related
- Dans une galaxie près de chez vous (2004); Dans une galaxie près de chez vous 2 (2008)

Dans une galaxie près de chez vous (English: In a galaxy near you) is a Quebec French language television series that aired on Canal Famille (later Vrak.TV) from January 25, 1999 to November 25, 2001, and a movie of the same name, released in 2004. The second movie, Dans une galaxie près de chez vous 2, was released in April 2008. There have been rumours of a third movie since 2016, but no official announcements have been made. It is a humorous sci-fi parody.

== Television show ==
=== Synopsis ===
The series chronicles the long, futuristic voyage of a team of Québécois space explorers who venture outside our galaxy, looking for a planet capable of sustaining life for all humankind in the year 2034, after the destruction of the ozone layer through excessive human pollution, prompting the need to find a new planet Earth. The few habitable planets encountered are ultimately abandoned either because they are already occupied (emphasizing the wrongdoing of invading other civilizations and cultures), or because upon closer inspection they are found to have other problems, such as cow-sized mosquitoes, high radiation levels, dog overpopulation, unsuitable living environment, and other issues.

Using the classic sitcom style, the characters' interactions drive the main plot in the same recurring spaceship sets (the bridge, dormitories, medical room, hallways). Occasionally, scenes are shot outside of the ship on alien planets being explored; these generic alien-world scenes tend to be shot in-studio. The satirical humor of the show is heightened by playing on the fact that the characters themselves recognize the farfetchedness of the universe in which they live and much of the series' comic relief is derived from the look and feel of low-budget set (an alien is obviously a human only painted green, gadgets are recognizable objects, etc.). The script, written by Claude Legault who also plays Flavien, and Pierre-Yves Bernard, plays a lot on clichés of all types, word play (especially Quebec slang), parodies and sketch comedy. A lot of the comedy is also based on the group's dynamics and reactions to certain events, such as the entire crew turning their heads in the same direction every time the captain says the word "mission". Many aspects of the show reflect Québécois culture; some scenes involve a complete picture of traditional Quebec.

The starship, christened Romano Fafard, is led by Captain Charles Patenaude (played by Guy Jodoin), a presumptuous but endearing man prone to making pompous, solemn declarations, with a knack for screwing up when saying proverbs or quoting philosophers. Other members include: Flavien Bouchard (Claude Legault), the radar operator who possesses heightened senses and is in desperate search for his father (it is learned in the last season that his dad is an alien), Bob Dieudonné Marcellin (Didier Lucien), a bald, black chubby man who is the spaceship pilot (the spaceship's dashboard is a bus dashboard, complete with steering wheel) who is best friends with Flavien and who obsesses over two things: food and Petrolia Staneslavsky (Mélanie Ménard). Petrolia is a half-Russian space orphan whose inventiveness seems to cause just as many problems as it solves. She is in a relationship with Flavien. Serge (Réal Bossé) is a humanoid robot Petrolia created, stricken with multiple personalities and abilities and who is constantly falling into disrepair. Valence Leclerc (Isabelle Brossard first season and Sylvie Moreau subsequent seasons) is the ship's psychologist but assumes all medical functions as well. She and the captain are secretly in love (until the last episode of the 3rd season). Brad Spitfire (Stéphane Crête), the resident scientist, is cause for most of the plot conflicts and complications. His main objective is to become captain. He is anti-social, power-hungry, egotistic, Machiavellian and incredibly weak and sensitive, though generally not of other's feelings. Despite these, actor Stéphane Crête makes Brad one of the series' most amusing and lovable characters.

The show evolved greatly between the first and last season. In the first episode of the second season, two characters disappeared: Falbo Gotta (Paul Ahmarani), the ship's mercenary and protector, and Mirabella Romario (Pascale Montpetit), the ship's doctor who turned out to be a criminal who faked her way to employment on the ship in order to run away from the world police. It is after being finally revealed as an impostor that Mirabella left the ship, followed by Falbo who got lost looking for her. Not long after their departure, Petrolia and Serge were found and filled in their spots. It is revealed in a later episode that Falbo and Mirabella have survived and are living peacefully on the planet they were left on.

=== Background ===
The series is a parody of science-fiction works like Star Trek or Red Dwarf and often dealt with environmentalism, humanitarianism, pacifism and ethics. Most members of the team subscribe to these noble morals, with the notable exception of Brad Spitfire.

The title translates to In a galaxy near you, a pun on the classic cinema advertising line Coming to a theatre near you. It was initially set to be broadcast on a mainstream network under the name Vadrouille de l'espace. Patrouille du cosmos (Space Patrol) is the Quebec French language title of Star Trek (France knows it by its original title); Vadrouille de l'espace basically translates to Casual Space Journey. Science fiction being rare in Quebec fiction, the main networks ultimately did risk broadcasting the show. The creators turned to the youth-oriented Canal Famille, the former name of Vrak TV, who welcomed the project. Even though it was presented on a children's channel, its humour is, while caricatural, often relatively mature and sophisticated.

== Movie ==
A movie of the same title and premise was released in 2004. It proved to be a hit with younger and older viewers, and drew unanticipatedly good reviews from intellectual critics. It was also groundbreaking for its impressive special effects accomplished with a small budget and a short filming time, and for being one of the few sci-fi Quebec films, along with In the Belly of the Dragon (Dans le ventre du dragon).

The second "Galaxie" movie, "Dans une galaxie près de chez vous 2", was released to theatres on April 18, 2008.

A third chapter of "Galaxie" was planned; however, only very little information about it has been made public.

== See also ==
- List of Quebec television series
- List of Quebec movies
- Television of Quebec
- Cinema of Quebec
- Culture of Quebec
- Science fiction on television
- Science fiction
