= Motel Paradis =

Canadian crime drama TV series

- Also known as: Paradise Motel
- Genre: Crime drama
- Screenplay by: Sophie Deraspe, Stéphane Hogue
- Directed by: Sophie Deraspe
- Starring: Nahéma Ricci; Stéphane Gagnon; Isabelle Guérard; Vivi-Anne Riel; Rémi Goulet
- Music by: Frannie Holder
- Country of origin: Canada
- Original language: French
- No. of seasons: 1
- No. of episodes: 6

Production
- Producers: Véronique Jacob, Brigitte Lemonde
- Cinematography: Mathieu Laverdière
- Editor: Dominique Champagne
- Production company: Zone3

Original release
- Network: Club Illico
- Release: October 11, 2022

Motel Paradis (English: Paradise Motel) is a Canadian television crime drama series, which was broadcast on Club Illico from October 11, 2022. Its six episodes are directed by Sophie Deraspe, who co-wrote the screenplay with Stéphane Hogue. It stars Nahéma Ricci as Jen, who believes her teenage sister Noémie (Vivi-Anne Riel) did not die by suicide, three years earlier. Jen returns to her village of Val-Paradis and is assisted by retired police detective, Alain (Stéphane Gagnon). The series is set in rural Quebec. It was streamed via Australia's SBS on Demand from August 2024.

== Premise ==
In 2021, Jen has a near-death experience, which results in visions of her missing sister, Noémie. Jen returns to her rural village of Val-Paradis with former police detective, Alain to resolve the mystery of Noémie's disappearance in 2018. Jen's mother, Brigitte resides in the family's now-defunct Motel Paradis. Jen and Noémie had both been cleaners there before Noémie's disappearance. Fellow locals are mostly closed-mouthed and uncooperative. Jen encounters her former boyfriend, Simon. Bar manager, William employs Jen as a bar attendant. Local police boss, Patrick is ineffectual. He had determined that Noémie drowned by suicide, but her body was never recovered. Alain and Jen learn that the motel's best room was fitted with a spy camera, which recorded sexual activities of various clients, especially musician, Carl. Amateur porn videos filmed by that camera have appeared on the dark web for pay-per-view. The website was created by Simon, Carl and William as a money-making scheme.

Alain re-investigates Noémie's quad bike, which shows yellow paint from a school bus. He finds a black painted bus in the local scrapyard, with its lower layer matching the bike. Another local police officer, Éviva joins Alain's private investigation. Once Simon is revealed as the camera's installer and video editor, he is shunned by locals. Simon grabs Patrick's gun and shoots himself dead. Montreal-based detective Geneviève undertakes the investigation of Simon's death and appoints Éviva as assistant. Jen finds Simon's computer, which includes some of the hotel camera's videos. She initially suspects Carl, but Brigitte admits that Carl is Noémie's biological father. Geneviève and Éviva discover Simon's hard disc and a cryptocurrency thumb drive. Three years ago, William tells his father, Jean about a video showing him buying illegal weapons. Jean learns details of Williams's scheme and bashes Carl unconscious.

== Cast and characters ==
- Nahéma Ricci as Jen Paradis: sports car racer, bar attendant, Noémie's older sister
- Stéphane Gagnon as Alain Renaud: retired police detective, Geneviève's husband
- Isabelle Guérard as Brigitte Paradis: Jen, Noémie's mother; motel owner, recovering alcoholic
- Vivi-Anne Riel as Noémie Paradis: Jen's 14-year-old sister, presumed drowned three years earlier
- Rémi Goulet as Simon Lapierre: Jen's ex-boyfriend; Stephanie's partner, computer specialist, wood cutter
- Guillaume Laurin as William Richard: bar manager, Simon's friend, Jean's son
- Martin Dubreuil as Patrick Nelson: local police officer
- Larissa Corriveau as Pauline "Polo" Ouellet: falconer, drug dealer, sells catalytic converters
- Chanel Mings as Éviva Phelps: recent police recruit, takes over Alain's investigation
- Dominique Quesnel as Julie Richard: Val-Paradis mayor, William's aunt, Jean's sister, former realtor
- Pierre Yves Charbonneau as Daniel Paquette: mechanic, tow truck driver
- Elisapie Isaac as Sabrina Bérubé-Caron: psychic adviser, Nathan's mother
- Anick Lemay as Mireille Richard: Jean's wife, William, Ulysse's mother
- Lucas DiTecco as Ulysse Richard: Mireille's son, intellectually impaired
- Gildor Roy as Jean Richard: prominent businessman, bar owner; Mireille's husband, William, Ulysse's father
- Alice Pascual as Geneviève Hernandez: Alain's wife, detective inspector
- Édouard Tremblay-Grenier as Nathan Bérubé-Caron: Noémie's drummer, school friend
- Éric Robidoux as Carl Gagnon: part-time musician, former amateur porn star
- Romane Denis as Stéphanie: Simon's partner, Jen's former best friend
- Dany Boudreault as Alexandre: riverbank property owner, Michel's partner
- Eric Cabana as Michel: riverbank property owner, Alexandre's partner
- Jean Drolet as Maurice: Jen's great uncle, scrapyard owner
- Isabelle Myre Lacase as Jocelyn: junior local police officer
- Louise Bombardier as Madeleine "Mado": Jen's great aunt, scrapyard owner

== Episode guide ==
No.	Title	Directed by	Written by	Original release date
1	"Near-death Experience" (Expérience de mort imminente)	Sophie Deraspe	Sophie Deraspe, Stéphane Hogue	October 11, 2022
After sports car collision Jen's revived by CPR. Visions: Alain falling down; sand leaking from Noémie; yellow school bus. Jen to Alain: Noémie did not drown herself. Jen describes her near-death experience; believes Noémie contacted her. Alain requires evidence to investigate. Jen returns to Val-Paradis. Flashback: Alain tells Brigitte: anonymous witness saw Noémie at riverbank. Present: Superintendent: Noémie's case closed. William hires Jen. Flashback: Jen, Noémie argue about cleaning rooms; people search for Noémie. Present: Jen stays with Brigitte. Geneviève denies she's leaving Alain. Alain recalls: Noémie's clothes and quad bike at riverbank. Alain sees Alexandre, Michel, who had bought that land. Julie queries William: investigation's bad for business. Jen to Brigitte: hope to discover Noémie's fate. Jen, Alain visit sand quarry. They follow school bus towed past. Daniel: bus belonged to Sabrina; delivered to scrap yard. Alain scrapes bus paint. Jen faints inside bus. Sabrina: found bus in woods behind quarry. Alain asks Nathan about bus. Sabrina shows Jen where they stored bus. Jen finds most motel rooms are derelict. Jen puts Alain into room 35. Flashback: Brigitte screams when Alain closes case, leaves. Present: Jen turns off Brigitte's TV. Someone throws rock through Alain's window.
2	"Relationships" (Les relations)	Sophie Deraspe	Sophie Deraspe, Stéphane Hogue	October 11, 2022
Flashback: Noémie announced to perform, but does not show; Jen looks around. Nathan leaves stage. Present: Jen identifies Polo's truck, nearby. Alain photographs boot print near window. Simon: Noémie drowned; no-one would kill her. Neighbour: asleep when rock was thrown. Alain asks Patrick to analyse paint sample. Jen consults Sabrina about visions; Sabrina claims to contact others. Flashback: Jen, Noémie argue. Noémie rides off. Present: Alain rides Daniel's quad bike. Patrick, Éviva look at bus. Alain confronts Polo. Patrick advises Maurice to dump bus. Polo was near motel but did not throw rock; suggests Alain interview Carl. Polo: Noémie attended Carl's shows. Noémie sexually abused by Carl. Simon rebuffs Jen when she kisses him. She drives off, crying. Alain: left-handed Noémie, whose quad bike was parked by right-handed rider. Julie sold riverbank area to Alexandre, Michel. They ask Julie about quad bike they saw; Julie: ignore this. Jen, Alain argue over her visiting Sabrina. Mireille pays Brigitte's taxes. Ulysse liked Noémie, but not Jen. Alain checks Daniel: he's right-handed. Jen attends William's bar. Flashback: Noémie sings at bar. Present: Alain finds hole hidden behind painting in room 35. In adjoining room, Alain discovers wires. Camera had recorded Alain seducing Brigitte.
3	"View of Room 35" (Vue sur la chambre 35)	Sophie Deraspe	Sophie Deraspe, Stéphane Hogue	October 11, 2022
Room 35 videos: various people having sex; Noémie cleans. Alain: only room with hidden camera. Brigitte: did not know about camera. Alain takes fingerprints. Simon denies knowing about camera; no longer Carl's friend. Alain, Brigitte discuss their affair. Alain researches Brigitte's guestbook. Brigitte: Noémie had no boyfriend, was sexually inactive. Flashback: Brigitte's drunk; neglects Noémie. Present: Stephanie: Simon left without work tools, cell phone. Polo does not answer Daniel's inquiries about Carl and Noémie. Jen, Stephanie ask Jean about Simon. Carl told William about filming sex with Polo. Carl's wife: he's at soundcheck. Jean threatens teenager after he insults Ulysse. Alain tells Carl he's taken fingerprints from room 35. Carl claims he's changed, settled down; camera had nothing to do with Noémie. Carl denies having sex with Noémie. Jen to Stephanie: never had sex with Simon. William denies beating Carl. Jen work at bar; William searches for Simon. William to Carl: bar's hard drive removed; suspects Simon. Patrick, Éviva enter bar. Williams arrives grabs Polo, takes her outside. They argue about Alain's investigation. Polo drives off. Brigitte shows sex tape to Alain, someone sent it to Brigitte. Flashback: people search for Noémie. Present: Simon: installed camera; Jen starts choking Simon.
4	"Participation" (La participation)	Sophie Deraspe	Sophie Deraspe, Stéphane Hogue	October 11, 2022
Jen lets Simon drop; Éviva grabs Jen. At police station, Alain interviews Simon, who does not answer. Éviva questions Jen at motel. Éviva: Noémie visited Carl; did not have sex. Vision of Noémie stopped Jen; Simon not killer. Alain releases Simon to track conspirators; Jen released. Éviva officially takes over Alain's investigation. Jen discovers Simon's computer. Simon splits from Stéphanie; drives off. Patrick "lost" paint sample; Éviva takes another. William contacts Carl. Flashback: Simon to William: Alain's retired. William throws rock through window. Present: William: camera not related to Noémie's disappearance. Simon hides in forest camp. Éviva views dark web videos, Alain identifies Carl. Jean advises Alexandre, Michel to contact Patrick. Flashback: Julie to Jean: Mireille seen at riverbank. Present: Patrick wants to cover up camera videos. Simon's parents threatened due to his activities. Alain grabs Carl. Brigitte confirms Carl is Noémie's father. Jen becomes overwrought because Brigitte, Alain had sex. Police arrest Simon. Patrick interviews Carl: partnership with Simon, William. Éviva questions Simon, who does not implicate others. Carl: Simon edited footage for sale. Flashback: Jean attacks Carl, shuts down camera business. Leaves Carl knocked out. Present: Patrick checks Simon in toilet; shot fired. Vision: Simon yells for Jen.
5	"Revisiting Death" (Revisiter la mort)	Sophie Deraspe	Sophie Deraspe, Stéphane Hogue	October 11, 2022
Simon's corpse forensically analysed. Vision: Simon yells "Neige". Jocelyn: Simon grabbed Patrick's gun, shot himself. Geneviève takes charge of Simon's case. Éviva: Patrick hospitalised with shock. Geneviève searches Simon's backpack; finds hard disc, cryptocurrency flash drive. Geneviève interviews Jen, Brigitte. Neither knows what's on disc; deny knowing "Neige". Jen uses Simon's password: watches videos. Geneviève reports Patrick's poor gun handling; removes Alain from case. Flashback: Noémie sings, Nathan drums. Present: Geneviève to Éviva: cannot use Alain. Jean to William: police have Simon's hard disc. Flashback: William to Jean: you were filmed at motel by Simon's camera. Jean orders William to remove all copies, deal with Simon. Present: Éviva collects William. William: Carl lies too much; denies knowing Simon's porn business; asks for lawyer. William to Alain: Simon finished adding content three years ago; others add content, now. Alain promises to wipe remaining network. Éviva to Geneviève: paint samples match. Brigitte drinks at William's bar. Jen observes: Noémie, Nathan talking about sex; sees herself fight with Noémie. Jen seeks shelter with Sabrina. Jen asks Nathan about bus' toy cars. Geneviève concerned when Alain faints. Nathan leads Jen into bus. Vision: Jen enters bus; sees Ulysse playing with cars. Alain revives Jen.
6	"Repair" (Réparation)	Sophie Deraspe	Sophie Deraspe, Stéphane Hogue	October 11, 2022
Jen to Alain: has Simon's computer, have cryptocurrency drive's password. Daniel to police: bus already repainted; found behind Jean's quarry. Daniel: despite Mireille's orders, did not crush bus; let children play inside. Stéphanie: "Neige" was Simon's name for Jen. Geneviève accesses Simon's hard disc. Éviva asks Jen for Simon's computer. Jen declines: innocent people exposed to police, lawyers, media. Jen anonymously sends video: Jean and crew buy weapons. Alain asks Jean about Noémie. Flashback: Noémie sees Jean beating Carl, who faints. Jean chases Noémie, both on quad bikes. Noémie dies upon hitting bus. Jean returns home. Present: Alain: where's Noémie's corpse? Jean: do not know. Jen hands toy cars to Ulysse. Mireille: Ulysse did not paint bus. Alain takes Mireille to police station. Police enter Jean's mansion. Flashback: Mireille returns home, Jean describes Noémie's accident. Mireille: take Ulysse to park. Present: Mireille: undressed Noémie, left quad bike at river, buried corpse in sand pile; painted bus. Police discover Noémie's bones. Brigitte asks Alain to help Jen. Vision: Jen talks with Noémie; kisses Éviva. Geneviève sends cryptocurrency drive to Jen. Brigitte lives with Noémie, Éviva. William visits Jean. Ulysse raised by Julie, who visit Mireille. Éviva runs community restorative justice group.
