= Living 100 MPH =

2019 Canadian drama film

- Film poster
- French: Vivre à 100 milles à l'heure
- Directed by: Louis Bélanger
- Written by: Louis Bélanger
- Produced by: François Tremblay
- Starring: Rémi Goulet; Antoine L'Écuyer
- Cinematography: Pierre Mignot
- Edited by: Claude Palardy
- Music by: Guy Bélanger; Claude Fradette
- Production company: Lyla Films
- Release date: August 21, 2019 (Angoulême)
- Running time: 104 minutes
- Country: Canada
- Language: French

Living 100 MPH (French: Vivre à 100 milles à l'heure) is a Canadian comedy-drama film, directed by Louis Bélanger and released in 2019. A semi-autobiographical film, it centres on the coming-of-age of three friends, Louis, Daniel and Éric, from their early teens in the late 1970s, when they begin dealing drugs in their school, through to their young adulthood in the 1990s, when Louis discovers his passion and talent for photography.

Louis is portrayed by Matt Hébert as a child, Elijah Patrice-Baudelot as a teenager, and Rémi Goulet as a young adult. Daniel is portrayed by Nicolas Guay as a child, Zakary Methot as a teenager, and Antoine L'Écuyer as an adult. Éric, who first appears as a teenager, is portrayed by Dylan Walsh as a teenager and Félix-Antoine Cantin as an adult.

The film premiered at the Angoulême Francophone Film Festival in August 2019. It had its Canadian premiere in September at the Quebec City Film Festival, where it won the Prix du Public, before opening commercially on September 27.
