= Julie Le Breton =

French Canadian actress (born 1975)

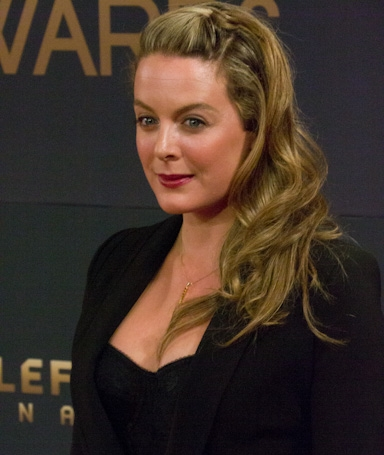
- Le Breton at the 2012 Genie Awards
- Occupation: Actress

Julie Le Breton (born September 8, 1975) is a French Canadian actress. She predominantly appears in French-language television series and films.

== Biography ==
She is best known internationally for her appearance in The Rocket, a French Canadian biopic about legendary ice hockey player Maurice "The Rocket" Richard. In this Charles Binamé interpretation, she plays Lucille Richard, the wife of the main character starring Roy Dupuis. For her appearance, she got a nomination for the Jutra Award and won the Genie Award for best leading actress.

She started her career with a leading role in the national television series Watatatow, and often acts in local television drama.

== Films ==
Year	Film	Role	Notes
2001	Au hasard l'amour	Charlotte	
2002	Québec-Montréal	Julie	
2003	Déformation personnelle	Marie-Hélène	
2004	White Skin (La Peau blanche)	Isabel Lefrançois	
2004	Dans l'œil du chat	Pauline	
2004	Mammouth	Manon	
2005	The Rocket (Maurice Richard)	Lucille Richard	
2005	Maman Last Call	Fanny Lemay	
2006	Le 7e round	Stéphanie Dubreuil	
2006	Embarrasse-moi	Marie	
2006	The Genius of Crime (Le génie du crime)	Amanda	
2009	Cadavres	Angèle	
2010	Starbuck	Valerie	
2010	Everywhere	Isabelle	
2010	L'anniversaire	Sandrine	
2010	A Life Begins (Une vie qui commence)	Louise	
2011	The Happiness of Others (Le Bonheur des autres)		
2012	The Pee-Wee 3D: The Winter That Changed My Life (Les Pee-Wee 3D)		
2012	Exile (Exil)		
2014	Tokyo Fiancée		
2015	Paul à Québec	Lucie	
2017	Father and Guns 2 (De père en flic 2)		
2018	When Love Digs a Hole (Quand l'amour se creuse un trou)	Thérèse, Miron's mother	
2020	You Will Remember Me (Tu te souviendras de moi)		
2021	Goodbye Happiness (Au revoir le bonheur)	Liliane	
2024	All Stirred Up! (Tous toqués!)	Sonia	
2025	Follies (Folichonneries)		
2026	You Will Be Free (Ma fille tu seras libre)	Nancy	

== Television ==
Year	Television	Role	Notes
1998–2000	Watatatow	Geneviève St-Pierre	
1998	Macaroni tout garni	1998	Snoro (voice)
2003	Hommes en quarantaine	Valérie Lepage	
2003	Ciao Bella	Catherine	
2003	Les Aventures tumultueuses de Jack Carter	Mélanie	
2004	Les Bougon: c'est aussi ça la vie !	Journalist in Canal Si...	
2004	Apparences trompeuses	Girl/info académie	
2005	Minuit, le soir	Évangéline / Brigitte	
2006	François en série	Marie-Hélène	
2006-2008	Nos étés	Evelyne Desrochers	
2009	Les hauts et les bas avec son amour de la vie: Minh-Tuan Lam	Isabelle (episode "Une Dernière Fois")	
2010	Toute la vérité	Véronique	
2010	Mauvais karma	Kim Wright	
2014	Les beaux malaises	Julie	
2016-2021	Les Pays d'en haut	Délima	
2020	Épidémie	Anne-Marie Leclerc	
2022	The Night Logan Woke Up (La nuit où Laurier Gaudreault s'est réveillé)	Mimi/Mireille Larouche	
2024	Anna Comes Home (Le retour d'Anna Brodeur)	Anna Brodeur	

== Awards and nominations ==
- Genie Award, 2007, award for best leading actress in The Rocket
- Jutra Award, 2007, nomination for best actress The Rocket
- Prix Gémaux, 2008, nomination for best actrice in a television drama in Nos Étés
- Prix Gémaux, nomination for best actrice in a comedy in François en série
