= Louise Bombardier =

Canadian actress and writer (born 1953)

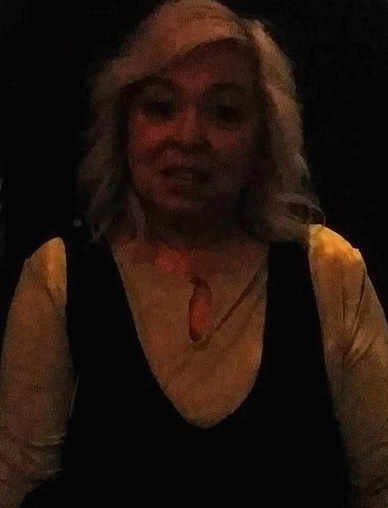
Louise Bombardier at Théâtre La Licorne (Montreal, 2019)

Louise Bombardier (Sherbrooke, July 11, 1953) is a Canadian actress and writer from Quebec.

== Early life and education ==
Louise Bombardier was born in Sherbrooke, Quebec, on July 11, 1953.

She studied literature and then theatre in the theatre option at the Cégep de Saint-Hyacinthe. She was part of the class of 1973.

== Career ==
It was during her studies, in 1969, that she made her debut as an actress. In 1976, she made her debut as a playwright by participating in the creation of the play Chu pour rien, chu contre toute, a collective creation in which she worked with Marthe Boisvert, Jacques Couture, André Saint-Pierre, and Marc Thibault. This play was staged at the Théâtre du Sang Neuf.

Throughout her career, she collaborated with several Quebec theatre companies, including Théâtre Petit à Petit, Gyroscope, Théâtre des Confettis, Théâtre d'Aujourd'hui, Théâtre de l’Œil, Théâtre de la Nouvelle Lune, Théâtre Urbi et Orbi, and Théâtre Le Clou. Her plays, Hippopotamie (1988–1991), Conte de Jeanne Marc, chevalière de la tour (1993), Le champ (1996), and Ma mère chien (2003–2005) have been translated and performed in English in English-speaking Canada. Her plays Le champ (1996) and Pension Vaudou (2000) have been translated into Spanish and performed in Mexico. Her play L’enfant (1993) was premiered at the Théâtre Folle Pensée and Théâtre de la Passerelle in Saint-Brieuc, France.

Bombardier was part of the Ligue nationale d'improvisation in 1981. In addition to being a playwright, she has written for radio, television and film.

On September 23, 2016, Bombardier was invited to the show Plus on est de fous, plus on lit! (The more the merrier!). She denounced Quebec theatre and cinema, which, according to her, leaves no room on stage or on screen for women who are aging. She criticized the fact that actresses often die tragically, thus leaving their place on screen or on stage to younger women. She was offended by the fact that at 63, she no longer has the chance to act or, when she does, her character dies early in the story.

"Soit je meurs, je ne joue pas et ne gagne pas ma vie." (Either I die, I don't act and I don't earn my living.)

== Awards and honours ==
- Shortlisted, 2012 Governor General's Awards, French-language children's literature, for Quand j'étais chien

== Selected publications ==
=== Novels ===
- 2011, Quand j'étais chien, Louise Bombarder & Katty Maurey, Groupe d'Édition La courte échelle

=== Short stories ===
- 2005, Flambant noir, Lanctôt Éditeur

=== Plays ===
- 1976, Chu pour rien, chu contre toute
- 1979, Le cas rare de Carat
- 1981, Dis-moi doux
- 1983, Claudette Fréchette, secrétaire rythmique
- 1984, Sortie de secours
- 1985–86, Bain public
- 1988–91, Hippopotamie
- 1989–90, Manuscrit de la mère morte
- 1989–96, Fanny Geste
- 1991, Château-geste (monologue)
- 1991, Folire, le garçon d'ascenseur
- 1992, Le cygne
- 1992, Tania Feber
- 1993, Conte de Jeanne-Marc, chevalière de la tour
- 1993, L'enfant
- 1994, Noël en juillet
- 1994–95, Contes urbains 1994 - 1995
- 1996, Noëlle en juillet
- 1996, L'affaire Fanny Geste
- 1996, Le champ
- 1998, Gunther et Angie
- 1998, La femme-cheval
- 1998, L'enfant fou ou L'enfant
- 2000, Pension Vaudou
- 2002, Contes-gouttes
- 2003–05, Ma mère chien
- 2004, Je crois que c'est arrivé
- 2005, La cité des loups
- 2005, La trilogie de l'enfant
- 2007, Petits fantômes mélancoliques, illustrations by Gérard DuBois

== Theatre ==
- 1986, Bain public
- 1987, La nuit des p'tits couteaux
- 1990, Billy Strauss
- 1990, Je suis à toi
- 1989–90, Les amis
- 1991, Loin dans les rues
- 1991, L'opéra de quat'sous
- 1992, Le voyage magnifique d'Emily Car
- 1993, Aux hommes de bonne volonté
- 1993, Cuisines et dépendances
- 1994, Wally's café S
- 1994, Tout va pour le mieux
- 1995, Poor super man
- 1995, Les années
- 1995, Noelle en juillet
- 1997–98, La salle des loisirs
- 1998, Silences en coulisses
- 1999, Pour adultes seulement
- 2000, Noel de force
- 2000, Le petit hochel
- 2003, La nature même du continent
- 2003, Le cours des choses
- 2004, Lousiane nord F.
- 2005, Les reines
- 2009, Petits fantômes mélancoliques
- 2009, Tout est encore possible
- 2011, La cage aux folles

== Filmography ==
=== Cinema ===
- 1993, Louis 19, le roi des ondes
- 1999, La vie après l'amour
- 2003, La lune viendra d’elle-même
- 2009, 5150 Elm's Way
- 2010, Cabotins with Alain DesRochers : Micheline Malo
- 2011, Gerry
- 2011, Les fils prodigues
- 2013, Exit
- 2014, Love Projet by Carole Laure : Mona
- 2015, L'odeur après la pluie (short film)
- 2016, Votez Bougon
- 2017, Fauve (short film)
- 2017, Pile ou face (short film)
- 2017, Gold (short film)
- 2018, Kanata

=== Television ===
- 1993–98, Avec un grand A
- 1995, 4 et demi
- 1999, La vie La vie
- 2001, Histoires de filles
- 2001, Le bunker
- 2001–02, Catherine
- 2001–02, Un gars, une fille
- 2003–06, Les poupées russes
- 2003–05, Les Bougon
- 2004, Grande ourse
- 2004–05, Trois fois rien
- 2005–09, Les Invincibles
- 2007–09, Bob Gratton: Ma Vie, My Life
- 2005, Virginie
- 2009, Destinée
- 2011, Toute la vérité
- 2012, Tu m'aimes-tu?
- 2012, Et si?
- 2014–16, Série Noire
- 2015, Les appendices
- 2015, 30 vies
- 2016, Like-moi
- 2017, L'écrivain public
- 2022, Motel Paradis

=== Web series ===
- 2019, "Teodore pas de H"
