= Cégep de Saint-Hyacinthe =

Public college in Saint-Hyacinthe, Quebec

Coordinates: 45.6175°N 72.9750°W

- Cégep de Saint-Hyacinthe's Official Logo
- Type: College of General and Vocational Education
- Established: June 1968
- Director: Roger Sylvestre
- Location: Saint-Hyacinthe, Quebec, Canada
- Website: http://www.cegepsth.qc.ca

Cégep de Saint-Hyacinthe is a CEGEP (College of General and Vocational Education) located at 3000 Boullé Street, Saint-Hyacinthe, Quebec, Canada. More than 4,500 students attend the CEGEP to study in one of five pre-university general studies programs and eighteen vocational studies programs. The CEGEP's twelve intercollegiate sports teams are called Lauréats.

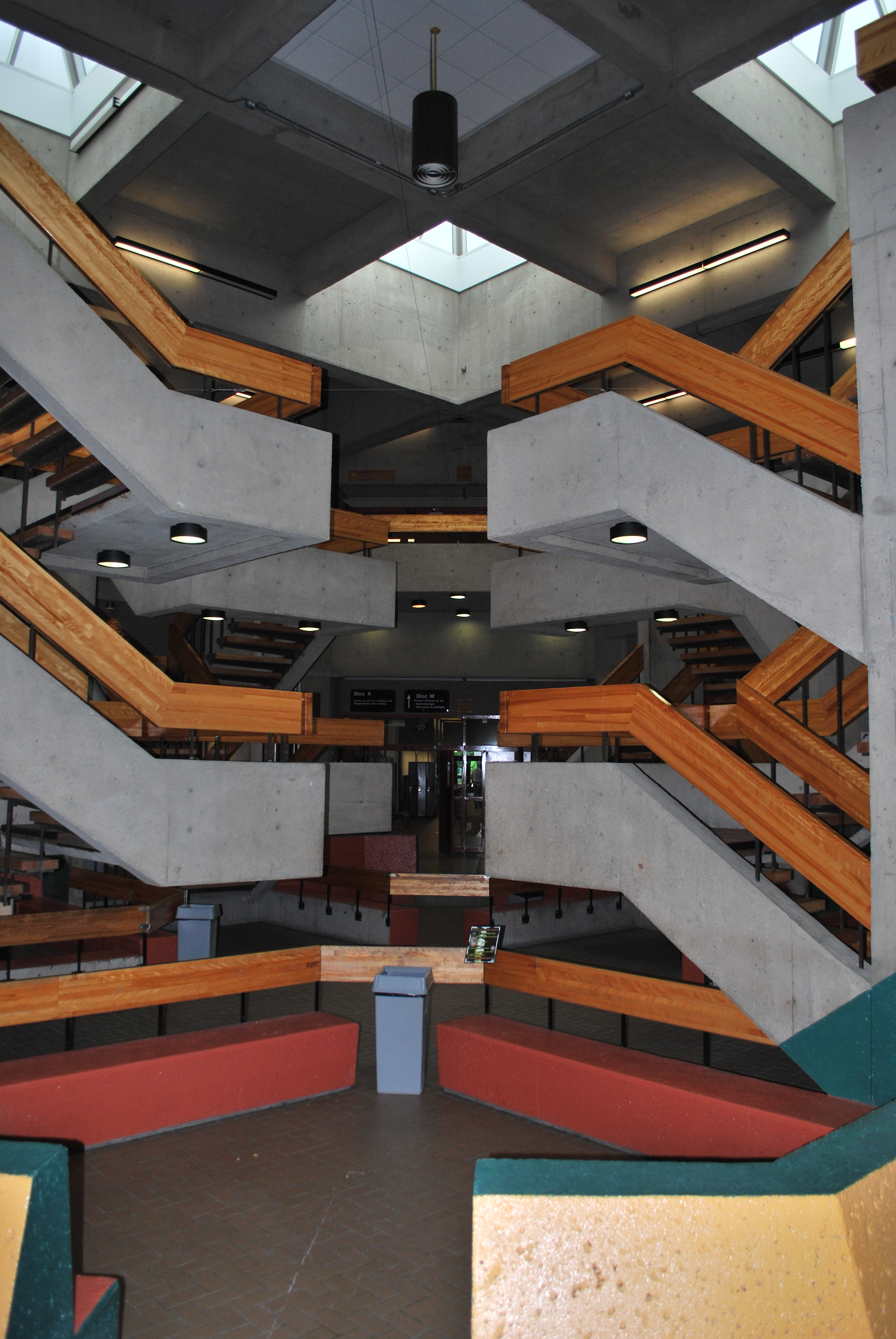
Situated at the center of Cégep de Saint-Hyacinthe, this open space is referred to as "Carrefour".

== General studies programs ==
- Arts et lettres (arts visuels et médiatiques)
- Arts et lettres (cinéma)
- Arts et lettres (exploration théâtrale)
- Arts et lettres (culture et création)
- Sciences de la nature
- Sciences de la nature (Sciences de la santé)
- Sciences de la nature (Sciences pures et appliquées)
- Sciences humaines
- Sciences humaines (administration)

== Vocational programs ==
- Techniques de diététique
- Technique d'analyses biomédicales
- Techniques d'éducation à l'enfance
- Techniques d'hygiène dentaire
- Techniques de l'informatique de gestion
- Techniques de gestion de réseaux informatiques
- Techniques de l'informatique de gestion
- Techniques de laboratoire : spécialisation en biotechnologies
- Techniques de soins préhospitaliers d'urgences
- Conseil en assurances et en services financiers
- Technologie de la mécanique du bâtiment
- Techniques de santé animale
- Soins infirmiers
- Techniques de comptabilité et de gestion
- Gestion de commerces
- Théâtre - Interprétation théâtrale
- Théâtre - Production théâtrale

== Notable alumni ==
- Louise Bombardier (born 1953), actress and writer

== Gallery ==
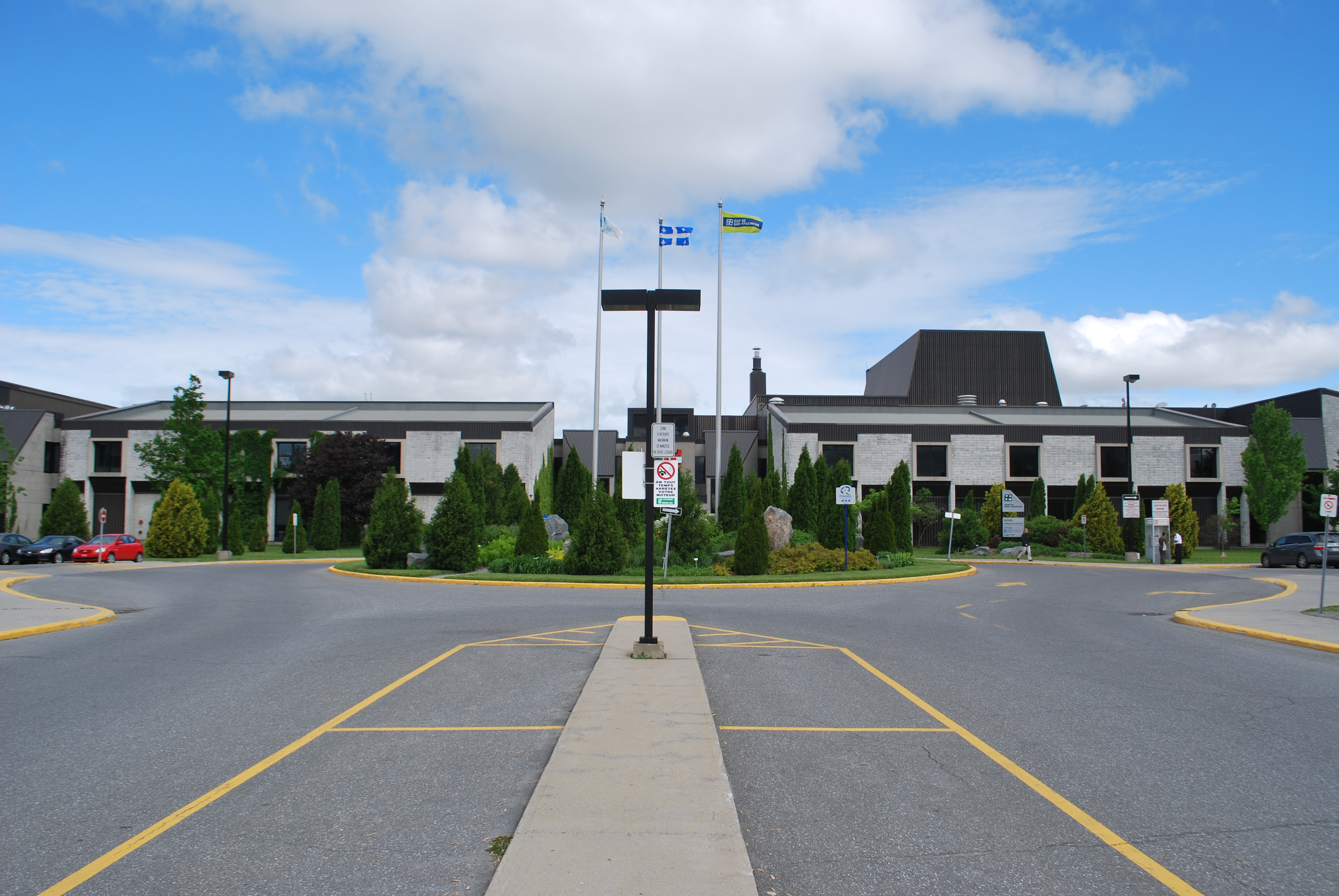
Cégep de Saint-Hyacinthe

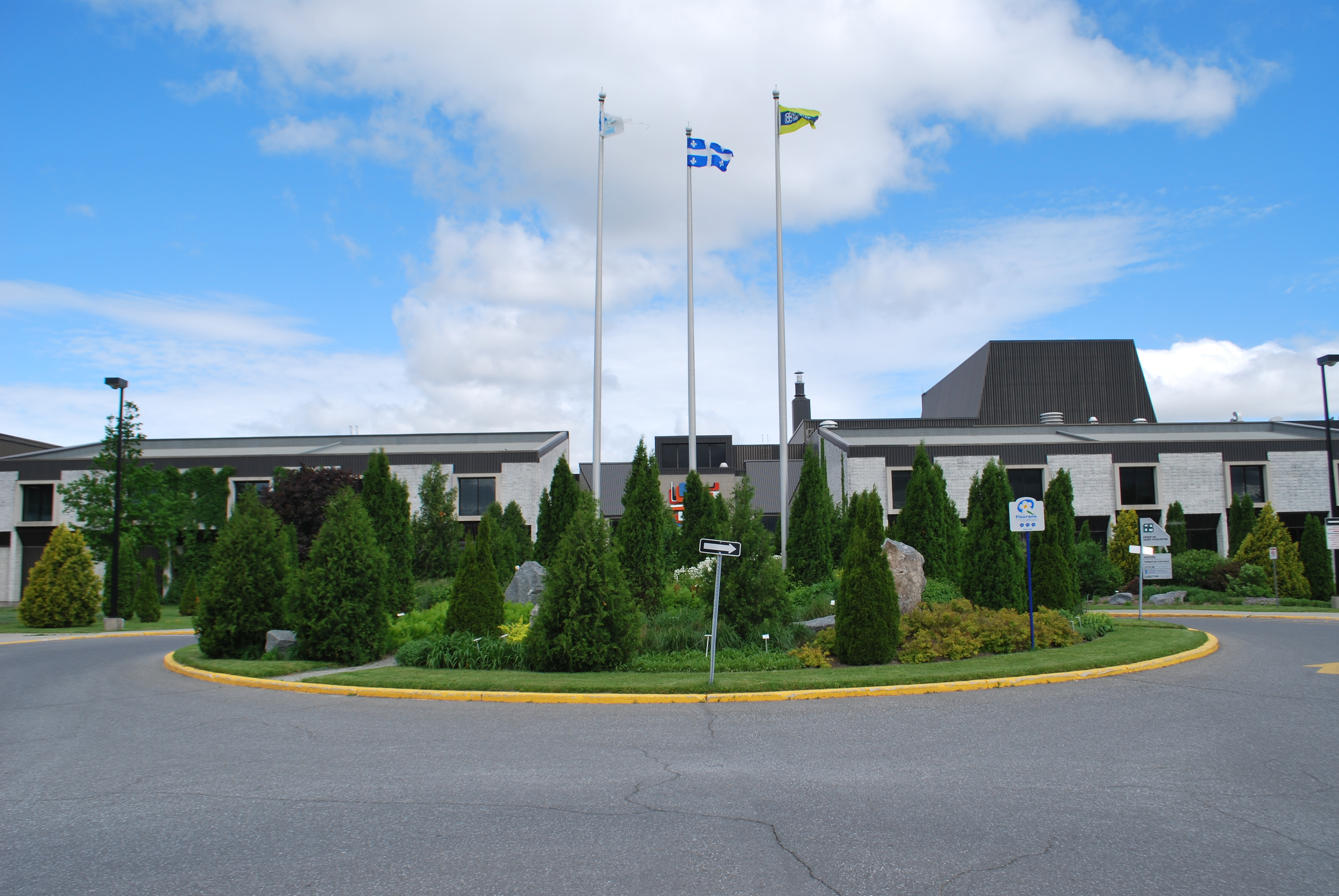
Cégep de Saint-Hyacinthe

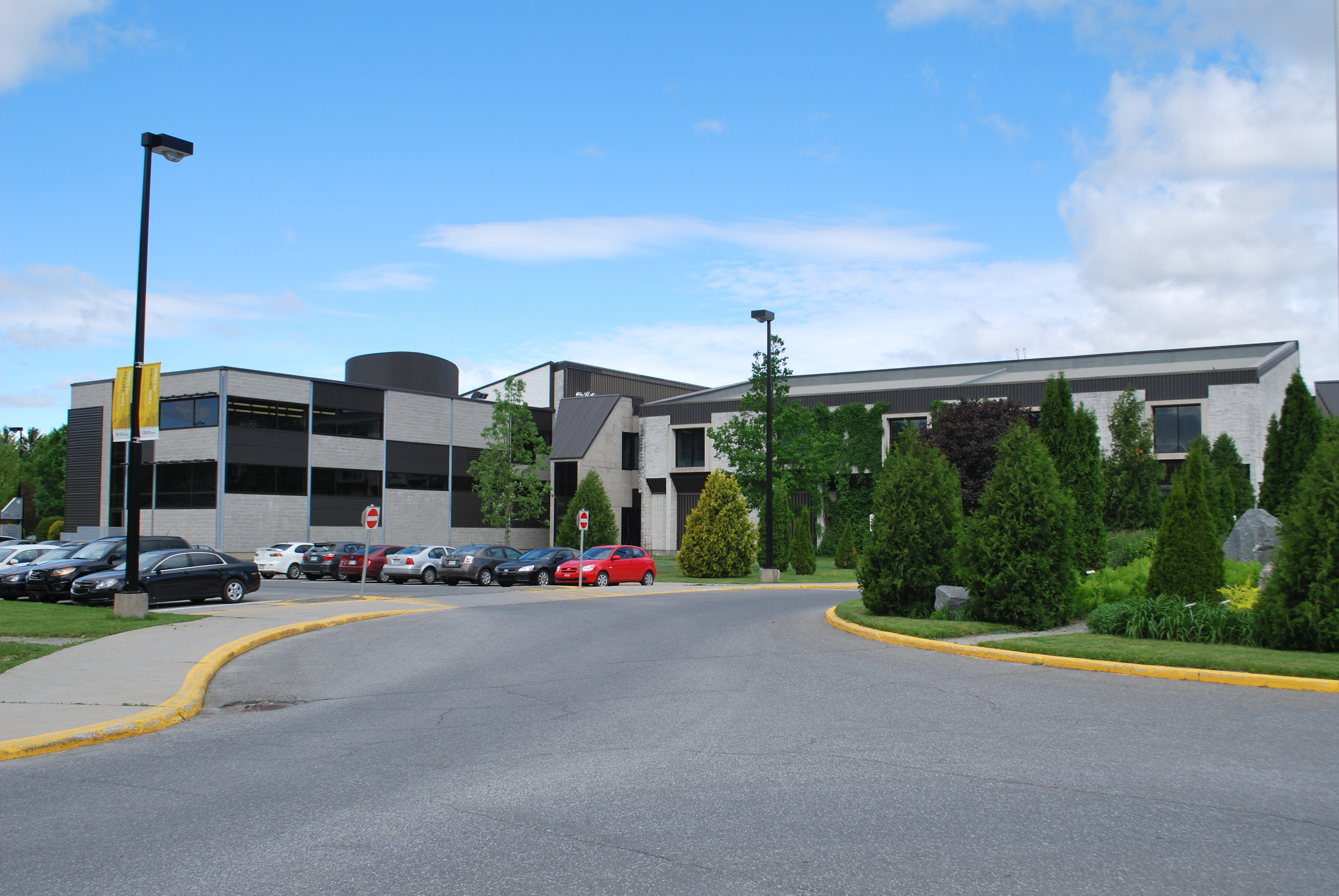
Cégep de Saint-Hyacinthe

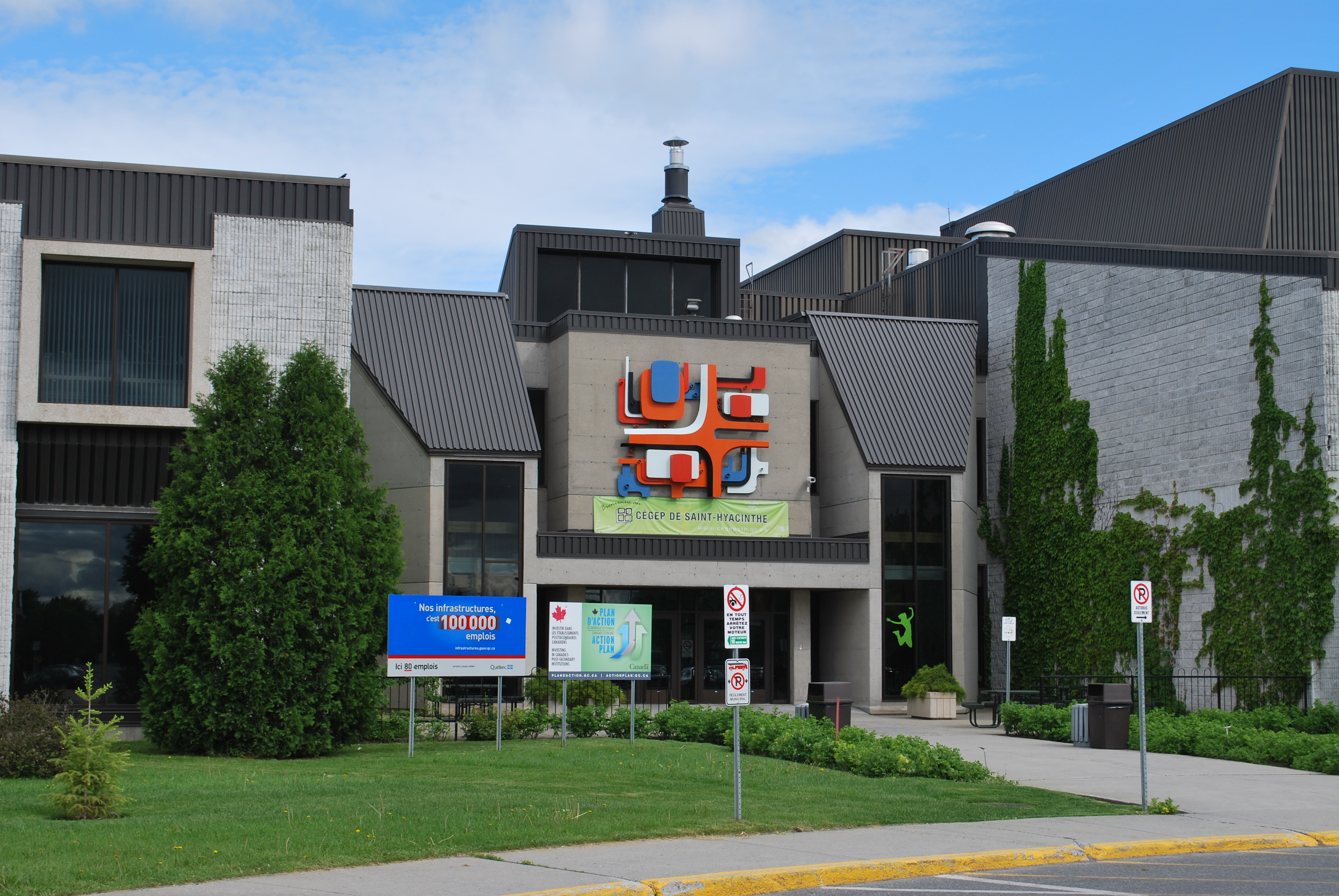
Cégep de Saint-Hyacinthe

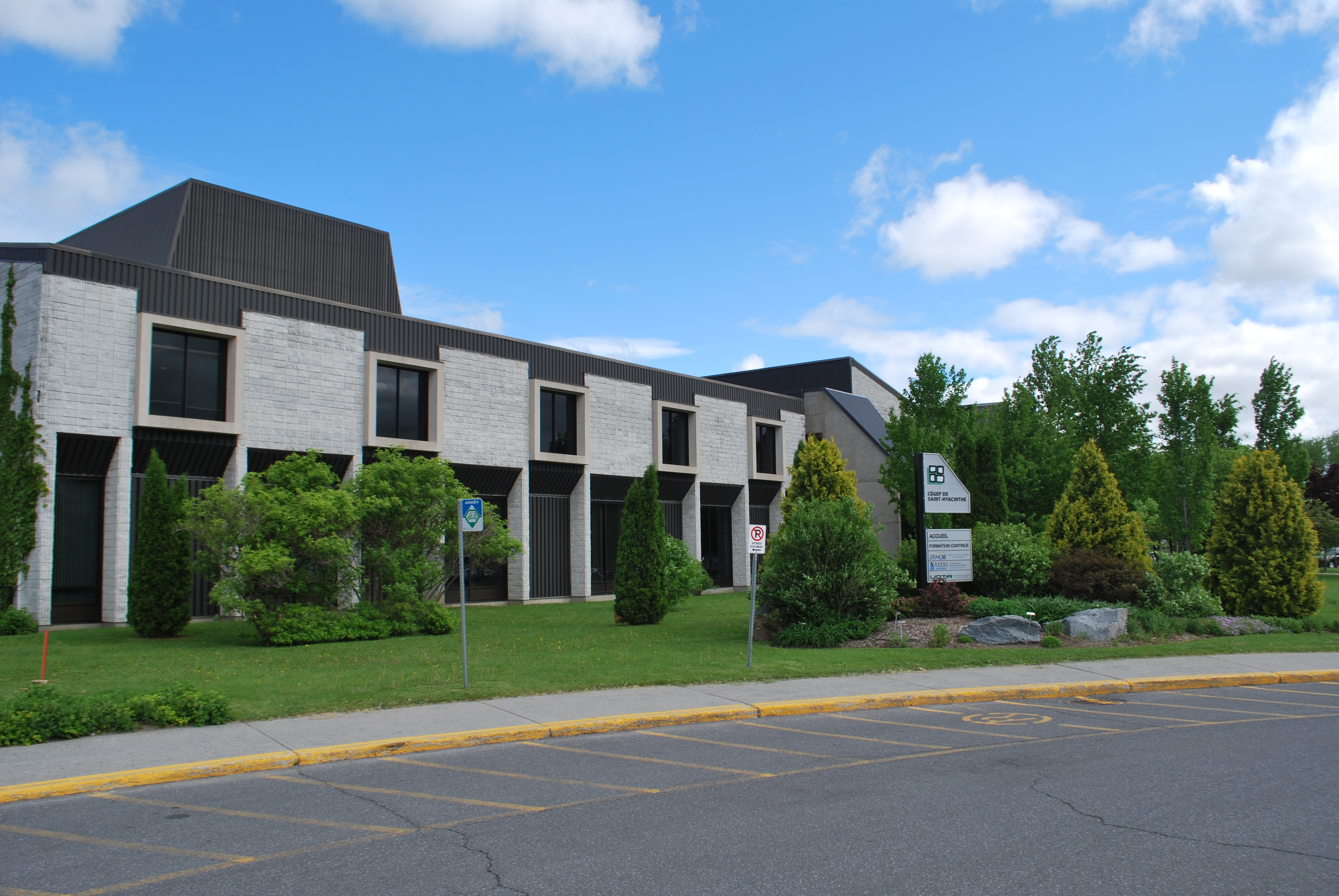
Cégep de Saint-Hyacinthe

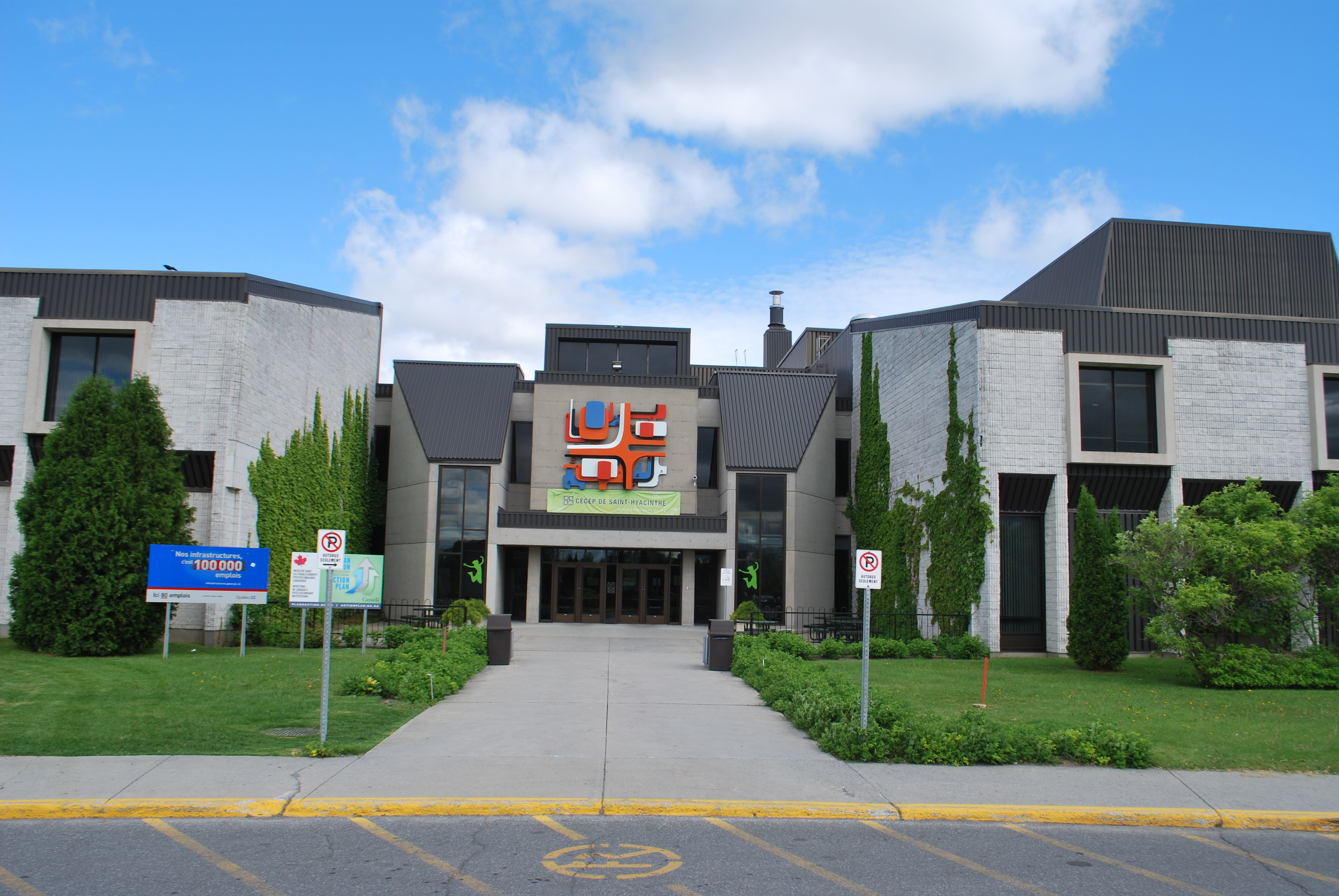
Cégep de Saint-Hyacinthe

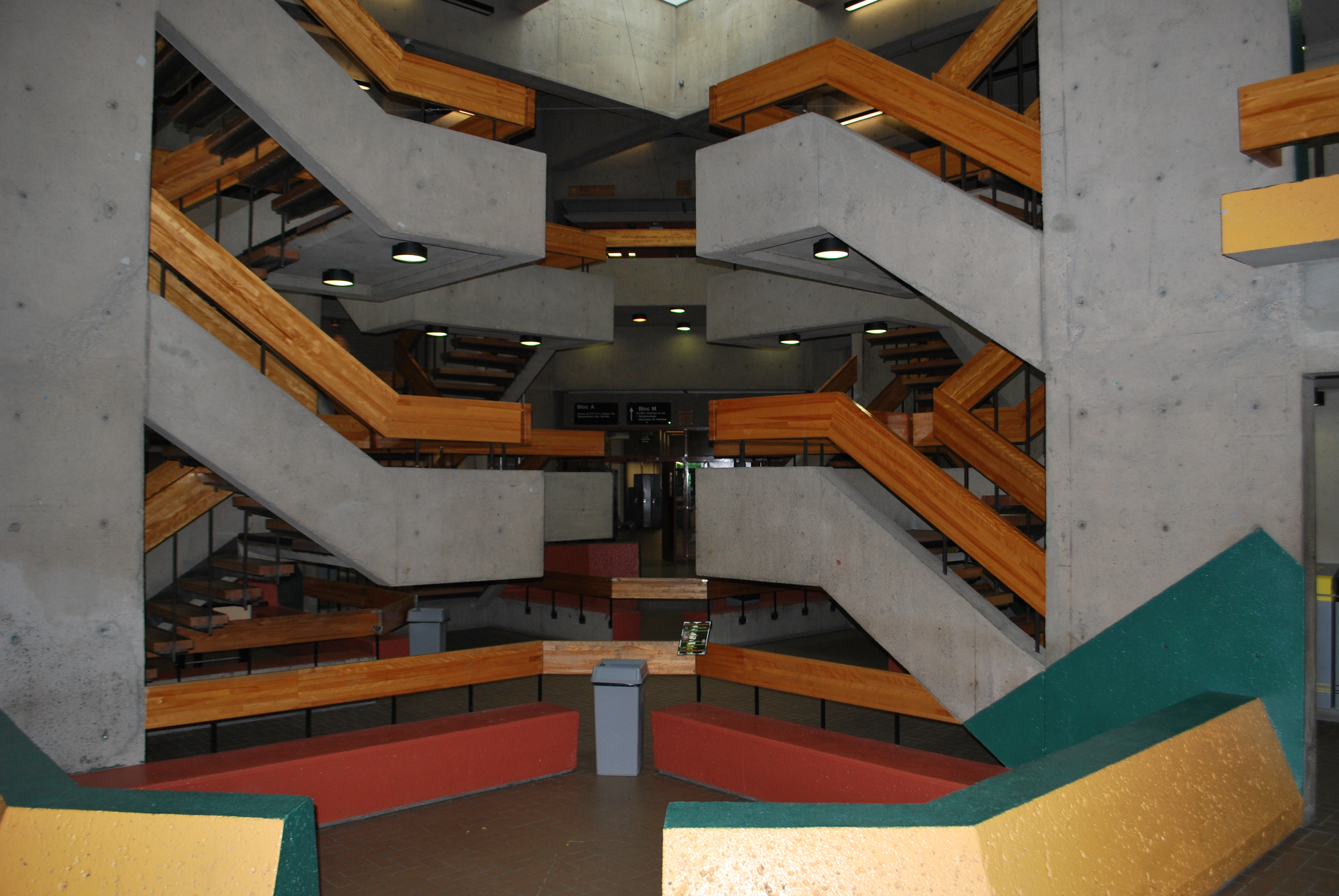
Cégep de Saint-Hyacinthe

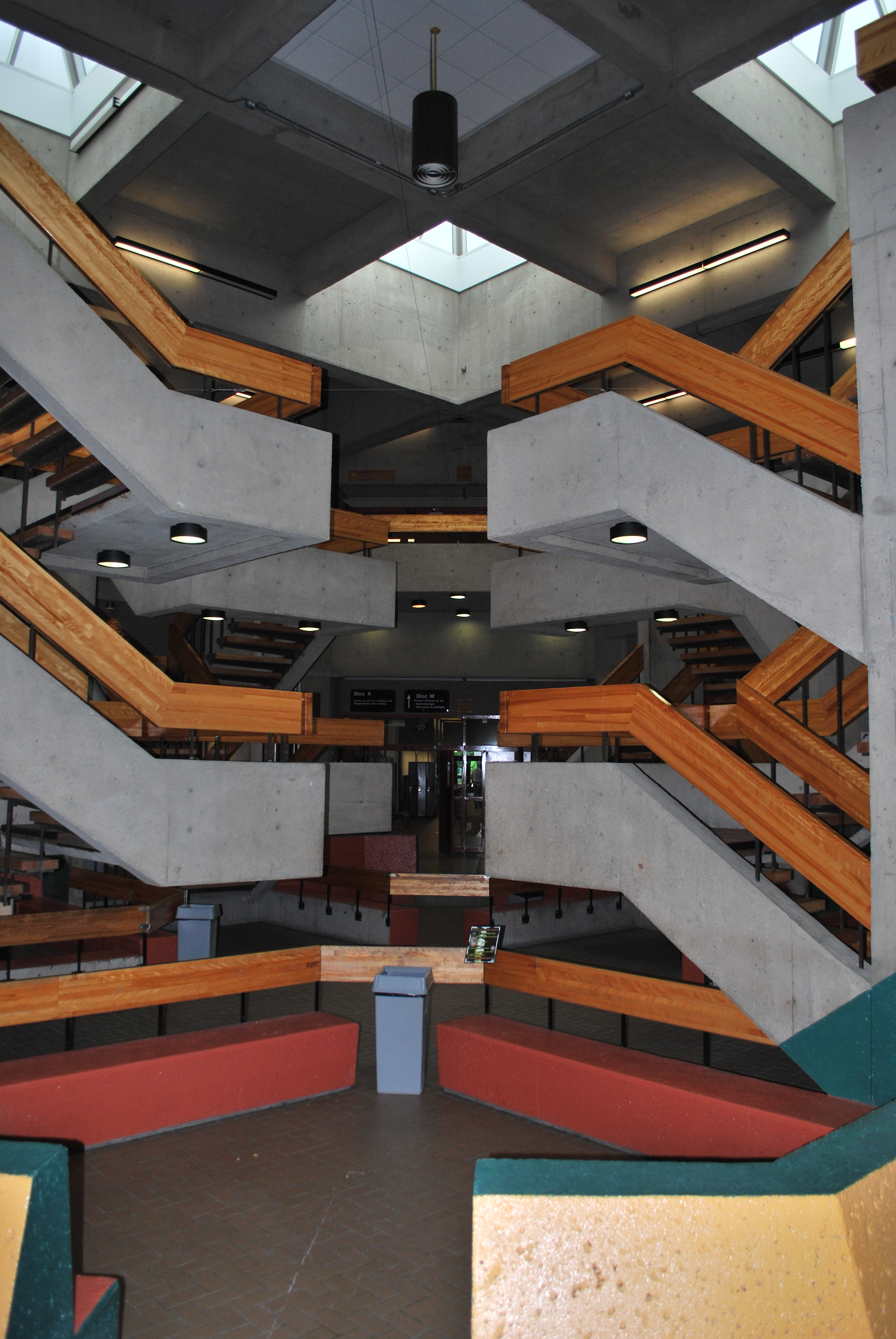
Cégep de Saint-Hyacinthe
