= Moody Beach (film) =

- Directed by: Richard Roy
- Written by: Richard Roy
- Produced by: Pierre Gendron
- Starring: Michel Côté; Claire Nebout; Andrée Lachapelle
- Cinematography: Guy Dufaux
- Edited by: Michel Arcand
- Music by: Yves Laferrière
- Production company: Max Films
- Release date: August 25, 1990 (MWFF)
- Running time: 95 minutes
- Country: Canada
- Language: French

Moody Beach is a Canadian drama film, directed by Richard Roy and released in 1990. The film stars Michel Côté as Simon, a man in the throes of a midlife crisis who quits his job and undertakes a road trip to the United States after inheriting a beach house from his late mother, only to find Laurence (Claire Nebout), a young woman from France, squatting on the property.

The film premiered at the 1990 Montreal World Film Festival. Its premiere attracted the longest ticket lineup of any film at the festival, which Noel Taylor of the Ottawa Citizen attributed to the success of Côté's prior film Cruising Bar, but the film was only modestly successful in commercial release.

The film was not favourably reviewed by critics. Taylor called it soporific and boring, dismissing it as a "pretentious melodrama", while Rick Groen of The Globe and Mail lambasted it, writing that it was "full of silence and fury, signifying . . . you guessed it - nada, zilch, rien. Or, at least, nothing that doesn't seem like so much pseudo-intellectual posturing on the head of a metaphysical pin. Yep, we got a brand new genre here: pin-head existentialism."

The film received three Genie Award nominations at the 12th Genie Awards in 1991, for Best Cinematography (Guy Dufaux), Best Overall Sound (Michel Descombes, Luc Boudrias, Jo Caron, Richard Besse) and Best Sound Editing (Jérôme Décarie, Marcel Pothier, Antoine Morin, Diane Boucher).
