= Christian Larouche =

Canadian film and television producer

Christian Larouche is a Canadian film and television producer from Quebec. He is most noted as producer of the film Louis Cyr (Louis Cyr: L'homme le plus fort du monde), which was the winner of the Jutra Award for Best Film at the 16th Jutra Awards in 2014.

He began his career in the 1970s as a driver for Cinépix, the production firm of John Dunning and André Link, working his way into greater roles with the company until making his debut as a producer with The Ideal Man (L'Homme idéal) in 1996.

In 2000 he launched his own company, Christal Films. The company made an aggressive push into film distribution in 2007; although its distribution arm put the company into bankruptcy by 2008, the studio arm survived as a division of Entertainment One, with Larouche remaining president of the division.

In addition to his Jutra Award win for Louis Cyr, he was producer of the Best Film nominees The Collector (Le collectionneur) at the 5th Jutra Awards in 2003 and The 3 L'il Pigs (Les 3 p'tits cochons) at the 10th Jutra Awards in 2008, and of Just a Breath Away (Dans la brume), a Canadian Screen Award nominee for Best Picture at the 7th Canadian Screen Awards in 2019.

== Filmography ==
- 1996 - The Ideal Man (L'Homme idéal)
- 1997 - The Ballad of Titus (La Ballade de Titus)
- 1997 - The Caretaker's Lodge (La Conciergerie)
- 1997 - The Kid
- 1998 - Airspeed
- 1999 - The Witness
- 1999 - Elvis Gratton: Miracle à Memphis
- 2000 - Believe
- 2000 - The Bottle (La Bouteille)
- 2001 - Dead Awake
- 2002 - The Collector (Le Collectionneur)
- 2003 - Les secrets des grands cours d'eau
- 2004 - The Last Tunnel (Le Dernier tunnel)
- 2004 - L'Espérance
- 2004-07 - L'École des fans
- 2004 - Elvis Gratton: Derrière le rire
- 2004 - Elvis Gratton 3: Le retour d'Elvis Wong
- 2004 - Baby for Sale
- 2004 - On the Verge of a Fever (Le Goût des jeunes filles)
- 2005 - Maman Last Call
- 2005 - Miss Météo
- 2006 - Without Her (Sans elle)
- 2006 - La peau et les os, après...
- 2007 - Taking the Plunge (À vos marques... party!)
- 2007 - The 3 L'il Pigs (Les 3 p'tits cochons)
- 2008 - Afterwards (Et après)
- 2009 - Cadavres
- 2009 - Taking the Plunge 2 (À vos marques... party! 2)
- 2009 - Heat Wave (Les grandes chaleurs)
- 2009 - Mr. Nobody
- 2009 - Detour (Détour)
- 2009 - Noemi: The Secret (Noémie: Le secret)
- 2011 - Gerry
- 2011 - On the Beat (Sur le rythme)
- 2011 - The Happiness of Others (Le Bonheur des autres)
- 2012 - The Pee-Wee 3D: The Winter That Changed My Life (Les Pee-Wee 3d: L'hiver qui a changé ma vie)
- 2013 - Louis Cyr (Louis Cyr: L'homme le plus fort du monde)
- 2014 - Henri Henri
- 2015 - The Mirage (Le Mirage)
- 2016 - Wild Run: The Legend (Chasse-Galerie: La Légende)
- 2016 - Un jour mon prince
- 2016 - The 3 L'il Pigs 2 (Les 3 p'tits cochons 2)
- 2017 - Major Junior (Junior Majeur)
- 2018 - Just a Breath Away (Dans la brume)
- 2019 - Before We Explode (Avant qu'on explose)
- 2019 - Heart Bomb (Une bombe au cœur)
- 2020 - You Will Remember Me (Tu te souviendras de moi)
- 2021 - Goodbye Happiness (Au revoir le bonheur)
- 2021 - Confessions of a Hitman (Confessions)
- 2022 - Suzanne et Chantal
- 2023 - Billie Blue (Cœur de slush)
- 2026 - Villeneuve: The Rise of a Legend (Villeneuve : l'ascension d'une légende)
- 2026 - Redemptions (Rédemptions)
