= Nahéma Ricci =

Canadian actress

- Born: September 22, 1997 (age 29); Montreal, Quebec
- Occupation: Actress

Nahéma Ricci, also known as Nahéma Ricci-Sahabi, (born c. 1997) is a Canadian actress.

== Early life ==
Ricci was born in Montreal to immigrant parents, and is of French and Tunisian ancestry.

== Career ==
Ricci appeared in the 2017 film Ailleurs. Ricci said she won the title role of the 2019 film Antigone after participating in a long series of auditions held to fill all the film's roles. In La Presse, Marc-André Lussier praised Ricci's acting in Antigone. She was named one of the "rising stars" at the 2019 Toronto International Film Festival, and won the Canadian Screen Award for Best Actress at the 8th Canadian Screen Awards. She also won the Prix Iris for Revelation of the Year at the 22nd Quebec Cinema Awards.

In 2020 she starred in the short film Girls Shouldn't Walk Alone at Night (Les filles ne marchent pas seules la nuit). In 2022, she portrayed Sophia in the film Montreal Girls. Nahéma made her English language feature debut in 2022 portraying Alix, a troubled teenager, in Under Spanish Skies, directed by Nathan Buck. She took the lead role of Jen Paradis in television crime drama, Motel Paradis (2022).

In 2023, she joined the cast of Aller Simple. In 2024 she starred in the film Hunting Daze (Jour de chasse), and in 2026 she appeared in L'Autre.
