= Alice Morel-Michaud =

Canadian actress

- Born: October 31, 1998 (age 27); Montreal, Quebec, Canada
- Occupation: Actress
- Years active: 2004–present

Alice Morel-Michaud (born October 31, 1998) is a Quebec actress. She is best known for her performance in The Pee-Wee 3D: The Winter That Changed My Life (Les Pee-Wee 3D), for which she garnered a Canadian Screen Award nomination for Best Supporting Actress at the 1st Canadian Screen Awards. Her other film and television appearances have included the films Aurore, Route 132, Love Project (Love Projet) and Major Junior (Junior Majeur), and the television series Trauma, Nos étés, Human Trafficking and Les Soeurs Elliot.

== Biography ==
Alice Morel-Michaud made her first appearance on the screen in 2004. Since that time she has appeared in numerous films and television series. She currently lives in Montreal, where she studied in a high school specializing in theater. She has been in a relationship with actor Anthony Therrien since 2015.
