= Claude Legault =

Canadian actor and television writer

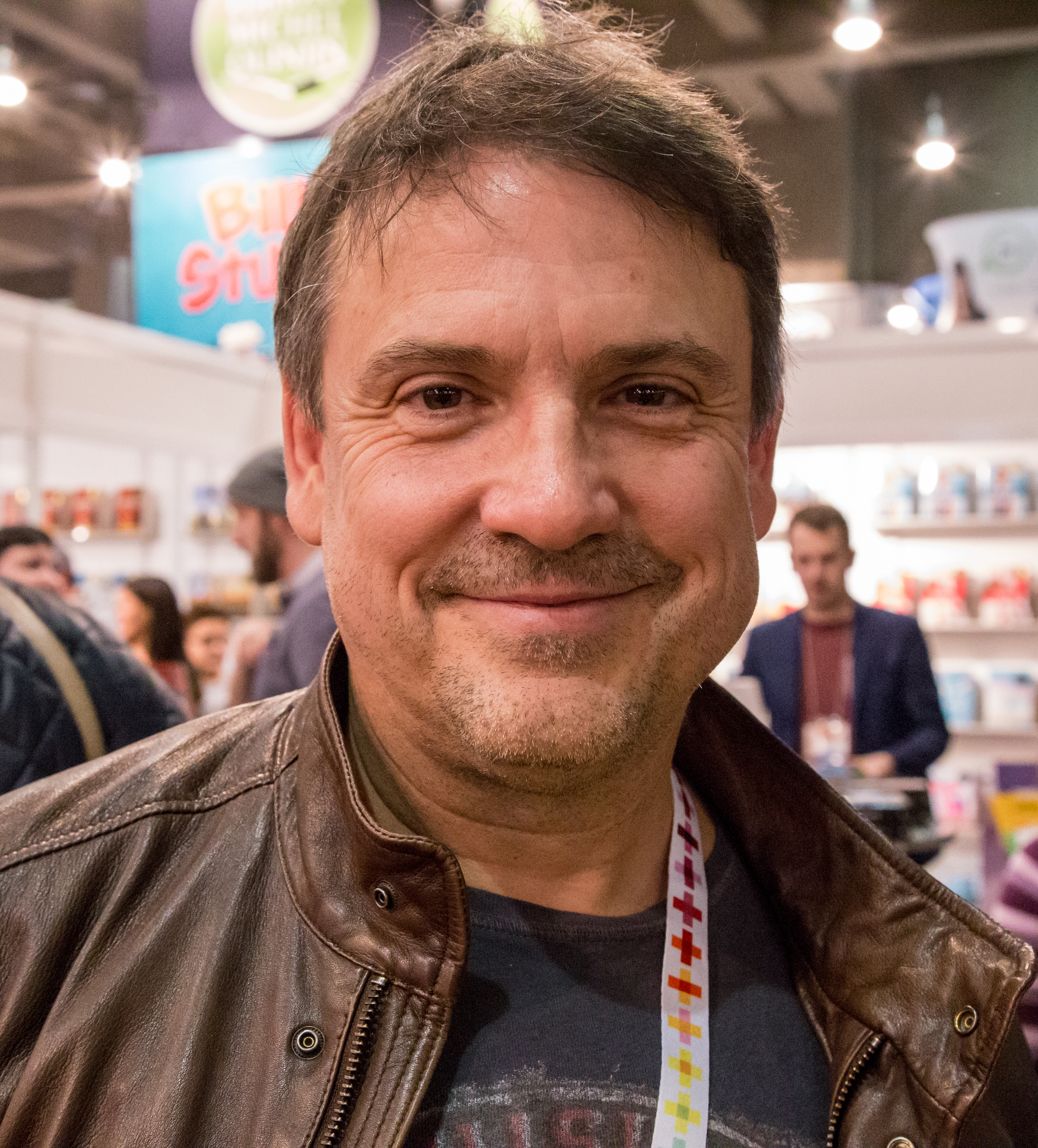
- Claude Legault in 2017
- Born: 26 May 1963 (age 63); Montreal, Quebec, Canada
- Occupations: Actor; Screenwriter

Claude Legault (born May 26, 1963) is a Canadian actor and television writer from Quebec.

== Biography ==
Legault was a star (2000-2003) of the Ligue Nationale d'Improvisation and has since appeared regularly on television, stage and film. He was part of the cast of the TV series 450 chemin du Golf and Annie et ses Hommes and of Le retour. He also plays in Minuit, le soir and Dans une galaxie près de chez vous, two series that he developed and wrote with his old partner in crime Pierre-Yves Bernard. Together, they also wrote the movie Dans une galaxie près de chez vous, in which he portrays Flavien Bouchard. Moreover, Legault was co author of Le monde selon Dieu, in which he played at Espace GO and at the Vieux-Clocher in Sherbrooke, Quebec. He has been seen on stage in Durocher le milliardaire and Propagande and on the big screen in Gaz Bar Blues, Les 7 Jours du Talion and 10½. He also starred in the series 19-2.

He received a Genie Award nomination for Best Actor at the 28th Genie Awards for The 3 L'il Pigs (Les 3 p'tits cochons), and won the Prix Iris for Best Supporting Actor at the 24th Quebec Cinema Awards in 2022 for Drunken Birds (Les Oiseaux ivres).

== Filmography ==
=== Television ===
Year	Title	Role	Notes
1992-1993	Watatatow	Paul Girard	6 episodes
1996	La Petite Vie	Menteur anonyme	1 episode
1996-2001	Le Retour	Jean Caporucci	
1998-2001	Dans une galaxie près de chez vous	Flavien Bouchard	60 episodes, also writer
1999-2003	Catherine	Gabriel	
2002-2009	Annie et ses hommes	Éric Séguin	
2003-2009	450, chemin du Golf	Alexandre	
2005-2007	Minuit, le soir	Marc Forest	28 episodes
2011	19-2	Ben Chartier	30 episodes, also writer (30 episodes); Prix Artis for Best Male Actor in a Leading Role - Drama; Prix Gemeaux for Best Writing for a Dramatic Series (shared with Danielle Dansereau and Réal Bossé); Nominated—International Emmy Award for Best Actor; Nominated—Prix Gemeaux for Best Male Actor in a Leading Role - Drama
2018	Fugueuse	Laurent Couture	10 episodes
2020	Bye Bye	Premier François Legault	Special

=== Films ===
Year	Title	Role	Notes
2004	Dans une galaxie près de chez vous 1	Flavien Bouchard	writer
2006	The 3 L'il Pigs (Les 3 p'tits cochons)	Mathieu	
2008	Dans une galaxie près de chez vous 2	Flavien Bouchard	writer
2010	10½	Gilles	
2010	7 Days (Les 7 jours du Talion)	Bruno Hamel	
2010	File 13 (Filière 13)	Thomas	
2010	City of Shadows (La Cité)	Colonel Julien Mandel	
2011	French Kiss	Fred	
2012	The Bossé Empire (L'Empire Bossé)	Jacques "Coco" Lacasse	
2012	L'Affaire Dumont	Polygraphe J. Landry	
2012	The Pee-Wee 3D: The Winter That Changed My Life	Luke Boulet	
2017	Major Junior (Junior Majeur)	Luke Boulet	
2017	Barefoot at Dawn (Pieds nus dans l'aube)	Bérubé	
2021	Drunken Birds (Les Oiseaux ivres)		
2025	Fanny		
2026	125, rue des Malaises	Martin	
2026	Haunted (Hantée)	Construction entrepreneur	

== Awards ==
- [10 ½] :
  - [ Jutra Award | Jutra Award for Best Actor ]
- [The 100 Watts Club] :
  - [Gemini Prize for best text for a children's program or series]
- 19-2 :
  - [Artis Prize | Artis Prize for Best Leading Male Role: TV series]
- [Annie and her men] :
  - [Gémeaux Award for best male supporting role # Teleroman | Gémeaux Award for best male supporting role: soap opera] 2006
- [Midnight, evening] :
  - Gemini Award for Best Leading Male Role: Dramatic 2005
  - Gemini Award for Best Text for a Dramatic Series 2006
  - Gemini Award for Best Leading Male Role: Dramatic 2006
  - Gemini Award for Best Text for a Dramatic Series 2007
  - Artis Award for Best Male Role: 2007 TV series
  - Artis Prize for Best Male Role: 2008 television series
- [1998] - [2001]: [In a galaxy near you] : Flavien Bouchard (co-author)
  - [Gemini Prize for best text for a children's program or series] 2000
  - [Gemini Prize for best text for a children's program or series] 2001
