= Rosalie Bonenfant =

Canadian actor and television host

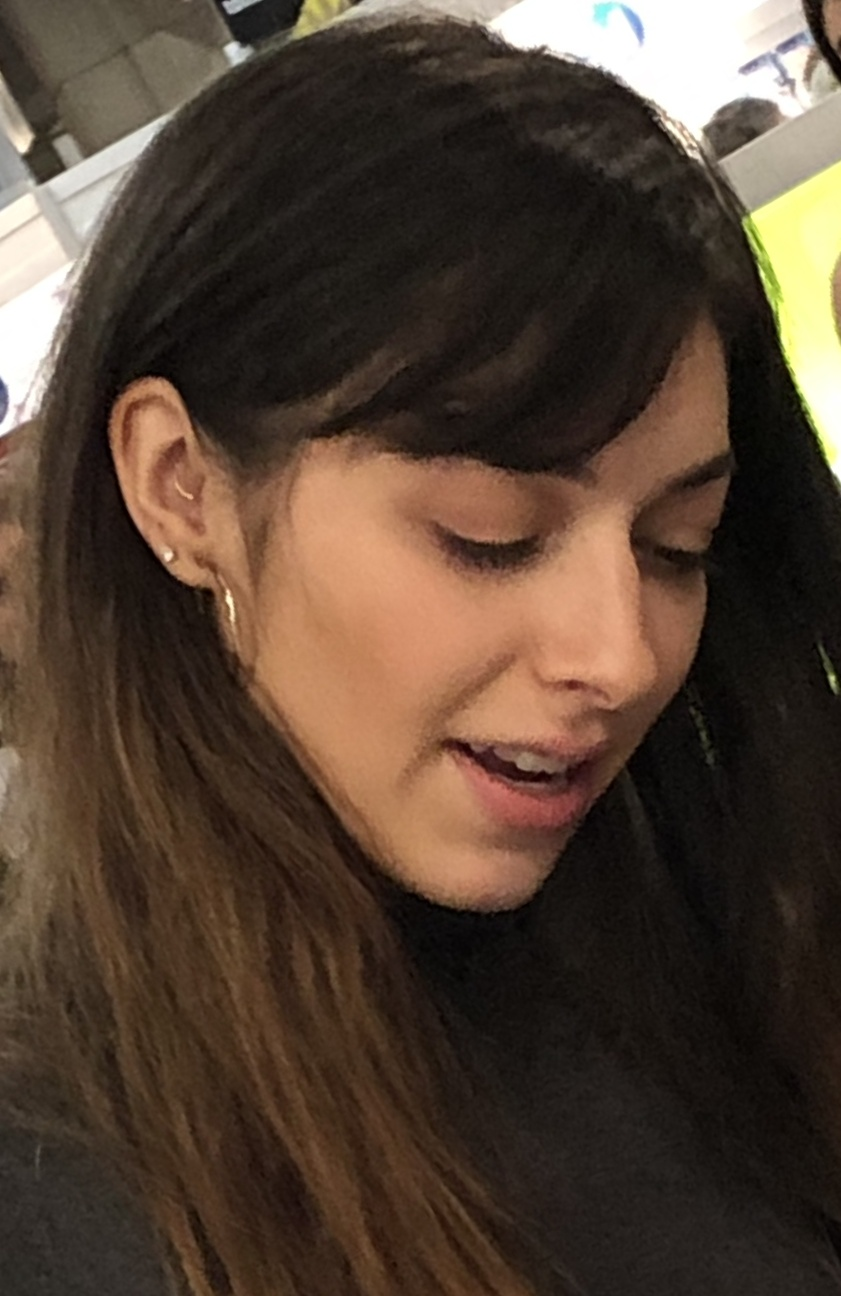
- Born: August 26, 1996 (age 30); Montreal, Quebec, Canada
- Occupations: Actor, television host
- Years active: 2010s–present

Rosalie Bonenfant (born August 26, 1996) is a Canadian actress and television host from Quebec. She is most noted for Deux hommes en or et Rosalie, a Télé-Québec talk and interview show she has cohosted with Patrick Lagacé, Jean-Philippe Wauthier and Ricardo Larrivée.

As an actress she is best known for her role as Ariane Duclos in the second season of the murder mystery anthology series Aller Simple, and her role as the title character in the 2021 film Inès. In 2023, she was announced as playing Joanne Barthe Villeneuve, the wife of Gilles Villeneuve, in Villeneuve: The Rise of a Legend (Villeneuve : l'ascension d'une légende), which is scheduled to premiere as the closing film of the 2026 Toronto International Film Festival.

She is the daughter of actress Mélanie Maynard.
