= Thrill of the Hills =

- Film poster
- French: Frisson des collines
- Directed by: Richard Roy
- Written by: Michel Michaud; Richard Roy
- Produced by: Louis-Philippe Rochon
- Starring: Antoine Olivier Pilon; Guillaume Lemay-Thivierge; Evelyne Brochu; Anick Lemay; Patrice Robitaille
- Cinematography: Yves Bélanger
- Edited by: Michel Arcand
- Music by: FM Le Sieur
- Production company: Solofilms
- Distributed by: Les Films Séville
- Release date: April 15, 2011
- Running time: 103 minutes
- Country: Canada
- Language: French

Thrill of the Hills (French: Frisson des collines) is a Canadian comedy-drama film, directed by Richard Roy and released in 2011. Set in Quebec in the late 1960s, the film stars Antoine Olivier Pilon as Frisson, a young boy whose father Aurèle (Patrice Robitaille) is killed in a workplace accident, who responds to his grief by enlisting his father's friend Tom (Guillaume Lemay-Thivierge) to take him to Woodstock so that he can see his musical idol, Jimi Hendrix, perform.

The cast also includes Anick Lemay as Frisson's mother Lucille; Antoine Bertrand as Burger, the village idiot of their small town; and Evelyne Brochu as Hélène, Frisson's teacher at school on whom he is developing a crush as he enters puberty.

The film entered production in late summer 2010, and the film had its theatrical premiere on April 15, 2011.

== Awards ==
The film won a jury award at the Schlingel International Film Festival in 2011. It received four Prix Jutra nominations at the 14th Jutra Awards, for Best Supporting Actor (Bertrand), Best Supporting Actress (Lemay), Best Costume Design (Michèle Hamel) and Best Hairstyling (Denis Parent).

Pilon won a Young Artist Award for Best Performance in an International Feature Film at the 33rd Young Artist Awards, alongside fellow Canadian Julia Sarah Stone for her performance in The Year Dolly Parton Was My Mom.
