= Antoine Olivier Pilon =

Canadian actor

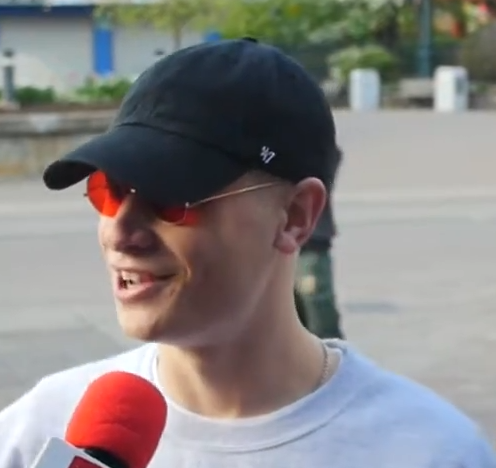
- Pilon in 2018
- Born: 23 June 1997 (age 29); Montreal, Quebec, Canada
- Occupation: Actor
- Years active: 2009–present

Antoine Olivier Pilon (born 23 June 1997) is a Canadian actor.

== Early life ==
Born in Montreal, Antoine Olivier Pilon moved with his family to Port-Daniel–Gascons in Quebec's Gaspésie–Îles-de-la-Madeleine when he was four. Studying in Le Phares school, he returned to Montreal when he was 10.

== Career ==
Pilon landed his first job playing in an ad on the French Canadian RDS sports channel in 2009 when he was 12. In 2010, he played the lead role of Frisson in Frisson des collines followed by a role in Just for Laughs: Gags.

In 2012, he took part in a number of television series playing lead role of William in Les Argonautes, a youth series on Télé-Québec and role of Clovis in Radio-Canada television series Mémoires Vives. He also took part in two seasons of Tactik, a youth series on Télé-Québec and a role in the short film Le Siège and role of Janeau Trudel in the feature film Les Pee-Wee 3D: L'hiver qui a changé ma vie. In 2013, he appeared in the Indochine music video for "College Boy". The controversial video about school bullying was directed by Xavier Dolan and banned on certain stations for viewers below 16.

The following year, Pilon was cast as the lead role in Mommy, also by Xavier Dolan. The film co-won the Jury Prize at the 2014 Cannes Film Festival. Pilon was named one of the best actors under the age of twenty by IndieWire.

== Filmography ==
=== Feature films ===
- 2011: Thrill of the Hills (Frisson des collines) as Frisson (directed by Richard Roy)
- 2012: The Pee-Wee 3D: The Winter That Changed My Life (Les Pee-Wee 3D) (directed by Éric Tessier)
- 2012: Laurence Anyways (directed by Xavier Dolan)
- 2014: Mommy (directed by Xavier Dolan)
- 2016: 1:54 (directed by Yan England)
- 2017: Major Junior (Junior Majeur) (directed by Éric Tessier)
- 2018: Youtopia
- 2019: Before We Explode (Avant qu'on explose)
- 2020: Most Wanted
- 2020: Death of a Ladies' Man
- 2021: Maria Chapdelaine
- 2021: Sam

=== Television ===
- 2012-2013: Les Argonautes as William (TV series)
- 2012-2013: Tactik as Jeremy Miville (TV series directed by Stephan Joly and Claude Blanchard)
- 2012-2013: Mémoires vives as Clovis Landrie (directed by Brigitte Couture)
- 2014: Subito texto as Vincent Beaucage
- 2023: L’air d’aller as Gab

=== Music videos ===
- 2013: "College Boy" (song by Indochine) as a bullied student (directed by Xavier Dolan)
- 2019: "Virtuous Circle" (song by Jordan Klassen, directed by Farhad Ghaderi)

== Awards ==
List of awards and nominations
| Award | Category | Character and film | Result |
|---|---|---|---|
| Young Artist Awards | Best Actor in a Foreign Film | Frisson, Thrill of the Hills (Frisson des collines) | Won |
| Young Artist Awards | Best Actor in a Foreign Film | Janeu Trudel, Les Pee-Wee 3D | Won |
| 13th Festival du grain à démoudre pour l'acteur le plus prometteur at Gonfreville l'Orcher | Special Mention | Frisson, Thrill of the Hills (Frisson des collines) | Won |
| Festival International du Film Francophone de Namur | Best Actor | Steve Després, Mommy | Won |
| 17th Jutra Awards | Best Actor | Steve Després, Mommy | Won |
| Vancouver Film Critics Circle | Best Actor in a Canadian Film | Steve Després, Mommy | Won |
| 3rd Canadian Screen Awards | Best Actor in a Leading Role | Steve Després, Mommy | Won |
