= Rémi Goulet =

Canadian actor

- Occupation: Actor
- Years active: 2011—present

Rémi Goulet (born 1997) is a Canadian film and television actor from Lavaltrie, Quebec, best known for his regular supporting role as Benji, the younger brother of protagonist Chuck, in the television series Pour toujours, plus un jour.

He began his career as a child actor, with roles in the television series 30 vies and Tactik, and the film The Pee-Wee 3D: The Winter That Changed My Life (Les Pee-Wee 3d: L'hiver qui a changé ma vie). He had his first leading role in the 2019 film Living 100 MPH (Vivre à 100 milles à l'heure), playing a semi-fictionalized version of filmmaker Louis Bélanger. In 2020, he starred in the film The Marina (La Marina).

In 2023, he was announced as playing Gilles Villeneuve in Villeneuve: The Rise of a Legend (Villeneuve : l'ascension d'une légende), which premiered as the closing film of the 2026 Toronto International Film Festival.

== Filmography ==
=== Film ===
Year	Title	Role	Notes
2012	The Pee-Wee 3D: The Winter That Changed My Life (Les Pee-Wee 3d: L'hiver qui a changé ma vie)	Joey Boulet	
2015	The Sound of Trees (Le bruit des arbres)	Francis	
2016	Mercy (Miséricorde)	Young trucker	
2017	Major Junior (Junior Majeur)	Joey Boulet	
2017	Fake Tattoos (Les faux tatouages)	Kev	
2017	Le temps qu'il faut	William	
2019	Living 100 MPH (Vivre à 100 milles à l'heure)	Louis	
2019	Ghost Town Anthology (Répertoire des villes disparues)	André	
2020	The Marina (La Marina)	Charlie	
2020	Je suis amoureux de mes souvenirs	Raphaël	
2023	Evergreen$ (Sapin$)	Étienne	
2024	French Girl	Malcolm	
2024	Trajectoire d'un corps perdu	Auguste	
2024	Salem on the Road (Salem sur la route)	Doug	
2026	Villeneuve: The Rise of a Legend (Villeneuve : l'ascension d'une légende)	Gilles Villeneuve	

=== Television ===
Year	Title	Role	Notes
2011	30 vies	Alex Fortin Bilodeau	12 episodes
2012-13	Tactik	Anthony Simard	29 episodes
2013-16	Unité 9	Rémi Chartrand	Five episodes
2016	Mes petits malheurs	Martin	One episode
2017	District 31	Maxence Lussier	Five episodes
2017-20	L'Académie	Théo	30 episodes
2020-22	Pour toujours, plus un jour	Benji	27 episodes
2021	The Sketch Artist (Portrait-Robot)	Gabriel Falco	Two episodes
2022	Motel Paradis	Simon Lapierre	Six episodes
2023	Detective Surprenant	Emmanuel Lafrance	Four episodes
2024	Distinct Society	Vik	Five episodes
2024	Sorcières	Laurent Roy-Major	One episode
