= Richard Roy =

Richard Roy is a Canadian director, actor and screenwriter. He has directed several feature films in French as well as television films and series for the English-language market.

He was raised in the village of Saint-Agapit, in Lotbinière Regional County Municipality, Chaudière-Appalaches, Quebec. His childhood in Saint-Agapit provided the inspiration for his autobiographical 2011 film, Frisson des Collines.

== Filmography ==
=== Director ===
- 1986: Transit
- 1990: Moody Beach
- 1996: Caboose
- 1997: Le Masque (TV series)
- 2000: Café Olé
- 2002 : Le Dernier chapitre: La Suite (TV mini-series)
- 2003: Deception (video)
- 2003: The Last Chapter II: The War Continues (TV mini-series)
- 2004: A Deadly Encounter (TV)
- 2005: Crimes of Passion (TV)
- 2005: Forbidden Secrets (TV)
- 2006: Flirting With Danger (TV)
- 2006: Thrill of the Kill (TV)
- 2009: Final Verdict (TV)
- 2011: Thrill of the Hills (Frisson des collines)

=== Performances ===
- 1989 : Lessons on Life (Trois pommes à côté du sommeil): Le client du Varimag

=== Screenplays ===
- 1990 : Moody Beach
- 1996 : Caboose (film)
