= Maître =

French title for lawyers

Maître (spelled Maitre according to post-1990 spelling rules) is a commonly used honorific for lawyers, judicial officers and notaries in France, Belgium, Switzerland and French-speaking parts of Canada. It is often written in its abbreviated form M^{e} or plural M^{es} in French and Mtre in Canadian English.

The origin of the honorific Maître is from the civil law tradition, and is still widely used in France and Québec.

== See also ==
- Esquire § Usage in the United States, equivalent honorific for lawyers in American English
