= W-18 (drug) =

Chemical compound

Legal status
- Legal status: Illegal in Sweden and Canada

Identifiers
- IUPAC name: 4-Chloro-N-[(2Z)-1-[2-(4-nitrophenyl)ethyl]piperidin-2-ylidene]benzene-1-sulfonamide
- CAS Number: 93101-02-1
- PubChem CID: 57501076
- ChemSpider: 28537256
- UNII: 04WOYJF7QH
- CompTox Dashboard (EPA): DTXSID90726944

Chemical and physical data
- Formula: C_{19}H_{20}ClN_{3}O_{4}S
- Molar mass: 421.90 g·mol^{−1}
- 3D model (JSmol): Interactive image
- Melting point: 157 to 158 °C (315 to 316 °F)
- SMILES: C1CCN(/C(=N\S(=O)(=O)C2=CC=C(C=C2)Cl)/C1)CCC3=CC=C(C=C3)[N+](=O)[O-]
- InChI: InChI=1S/C19H20ClN3O4S/c20-16-6-10-18(11-7-16)28(26,27)21-19-3-1-2-13-22(19)14-12-15-4-8-17(9-5-15)23(24)25/h4-11H,1-3,12-14H2/b21-19-; Key:BKRSVROQVRTSND-VZCXRCSSSA-N

W-18 is a compound in a series of 32 substances (named W-1 to W-32) that were first synthesized in academic research on analgesic drug discovery in the 1980s and appeared as a designer drug in the 2010s.

== History ==
W-18 was invented at the University of Alberta by a lab working on analgesic drug discovery in the 1980s, and preliminary studies in animals showed it had pain-killing activity in mice.

The chemical was detected in connection with recreational drug use as substitute for other controlled substances in Europe in 2013, and in the United States. In Canada, Alberta Law Enforcement Response Teams (ALERT) seized four kilograms of W-18 in a drug bust in Edmonton in December 2015 and W-18 was also detected by Health Canada in at least three of 110 fentanyl tablets seized from a Calgary home in August 2015.

== Pharmacology ==
W-18 was commonly reported to be an opioid in the popular press in the 2010s, which was later revealed not to be correct. W-18 was found to obtain weak activity at both sigma receptors and the translocator protein (peripheral benzodiazepine receptor). It also inhibits the hERG potassium channel with micromolar affinity, which could potentially cause cardiac arrhythmia at high doses.

== Legality ==
- In Sweden, W-18 was made illegal in January 2016.
- In Canada, W-18 and its analogues were made Schedule I controlled substances. Possession without legal authority can result in maximum 7 years imprisonment. Further, Health Canada amended the Food and Drug Regulations in May, 2016 to classify W-18 as a restricted drug. Only those with a law enforcement agency, person with an exemption permit or institutions with Minister's authorization may possess the drug.

== See also ==
- Ro5-4864
