= Christal Films =

Film distributor based in Montreal, Canada

Christal Films Inc. Les Films Christal Inc.
- Formerly: 7142901 CANADA INC.
- Type: Public
- Industry: Film production
- Founded: 2000; 26 years ago
- Founder: Christian Larouche
- Defunct: 2023; 3 years ago
- Successors: eOne Films
- Headquarters: Montreal, Quebec, Canada
- Parent: Entertainment One (until 2023)

Christal Films (also known as Les Films Christal) was a film distribution company, specializing in Quebec, French and international cinema. Christal Films is a former subsidiary of Entertainment One.

Entertainment One closed the division down in 2023 alongside Les Films Séville.
