= Melchiorri =

Melchiorri is an Italian surname. Notable people with the surname include:

- Anthony Melchiorri, American television personality
- Federico Melchiorri (born 1987), Italian footballer
- Manuela Melchiorri (born 1970), Italian swimmer
