= Qareeb =

Studio album by Najma
- Released: 1987
- Genres: Urdu poetry, Indian music, ghazals
- Labels: Triple Earth; Shanachie
- Producers: Bunt Stafford Clark, Iain Scott

Najma chronology
Qareeb (1987)	Ghazals By Najma (1988)

Qareeb is an album by the British Indian singer Najma, released in 1987. It was issued in England by Triple Earth Records before being picked up for an American release by Shanachie Records. Songs from the album appear in the Stephen Frears film Sammy and Rosie Get Laid.

== Production ==
The album was produced by Bunt Stafford Clark and Iain Scott. It was recorded in England, with Najma setting traditional ghazals to her own melodies. Triple Earth envisioned a jazzy recording, while Najma fought to keep the emphasis on her voice and the poetic recitation.

== Critical reception ==
Professional ratings
Review scores
Source	Rating
AllMusic	5/5 stars
Robert Christgau	A−
The Encyclopedia of Popular Music	4/5 stars
The Rolling Stone Album Guide	3.5/5 stars

Robert Christgau wrote that "the overall effect is twofold: gentle culture clash and sheer physical beauty." The New York Times thought that, "in [Najma's] lower and middle ranges, she commands the solid aim and tonality of a pop professional, yet she bounds off up the scale like a rock singer who wants to see how far she might go ... Najma's producers are right up-to-date in this era of digitally influenced recorded pop; in strongly etched strokes, they exaggerate the presence of a few instruments rather than accumulate a mesh of many textures."

The Washington Post wrote that "sweetly insinuating tones waft above the lilting electronic keyboards and skipping percussion of the tablas on tracks like 'Neend Koyi'." The Chicago Reader praised Qareeb's "rolling, funky bass, its circular violin figures, and its expressive saxophone," writing that Najma's "incredible" voice "never grew tiresome." The Gazette deemed it "a unique and masterful release."

== Track listing ==
No.	Title	Length
1.	"Neend Koyi"	6:42
2.	"Jane Kis Tarha"	6:17
3.	"Dil Laga Ya Tha"	5:48
4.	"'Apne Hathon'"	5:26
5.	"Zikar Hai Apna Mehfil Mehfil"	6:29
6.	"Karoon Na Yad Maga"	8:54
7.	"Har Sitam Aap Ka"	9:11
