= Dude Rancher Lodge =

Motel in Billings, Montana

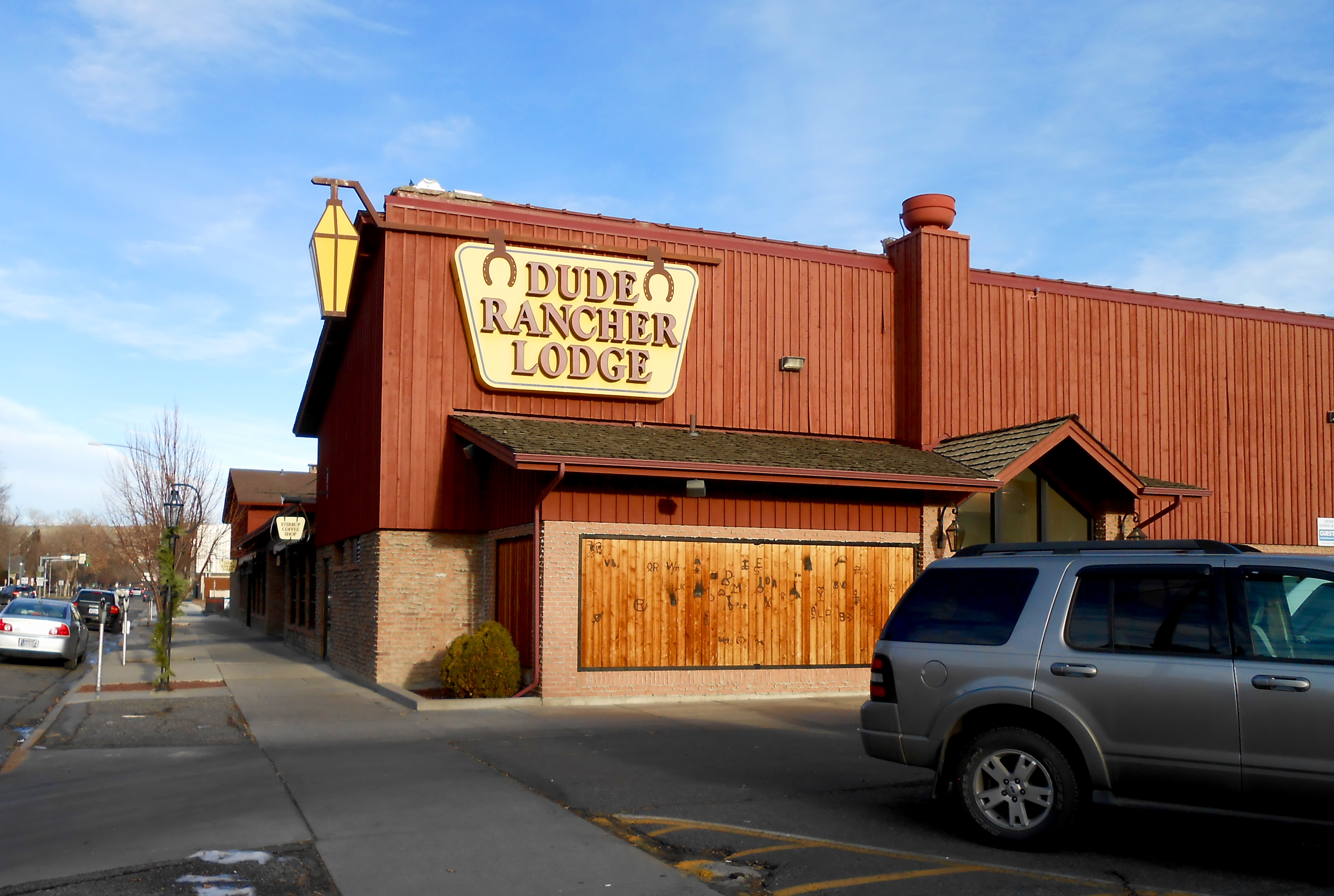
- The Dude Rancher Lodge, south side, featuring the "branding wall"

General information
- Location: Billings, Montana, United States, 415 North 29th Street, Billings, Montana 59102
- Coordinates: 45°47′12.12″N 108°32′13.92″W
- Opening: 1950
- Owner: Virginia Carlsen

Technical details
- Floor count: 2

Design and construction
- Architect: Everett Terrell of Cushing & Terrell
- Developer: Percival Sergeant Goan (1890–1962) and Annabel Arnott Goan (1900–1983)

Other information
- Number of rooms: 56
- Number of restaurants: 1
- Parking: yes

Website
- www.duderancherlodge.com
- Dude Rancher Lodge
- U.S. National Register of Historic Places
- Architectural style: Modern Movement: Ranch
- NRHP reference No.: 10000489
- Added to NRHP: July 22, 2010

The Dude Rancher Lodge is a motel in Billings, Montana, on the National Register of Historic Places. Known as "Billings' most unique motel", it was built in 1950 with a Hollywood-western style theme inside and out with many custom features, most original to the building. Owned for over 40 years by the family corporation of its original owners, with a single change of ownership in 1992, the motel and its attached restaurant is still in operation today and looks much as it did when originally constructed.

In the 21st century, the locally owned establishment has survived as one of only 10 owner-operated motels left in Billings, against increased competition from a significant expansion in the number of motel rooms available in the city. After having the motel studied and upgraded by Hotel Impossible in 2012, followed shortly thereafter by the local police engaging in a "full-on firefight" with a local criminal, the motel saw its online bookings increase 250 percent. Reports that the facility is haunted by its original owner have led to three popular rooms being booked up to a year in advance.

== Design ==
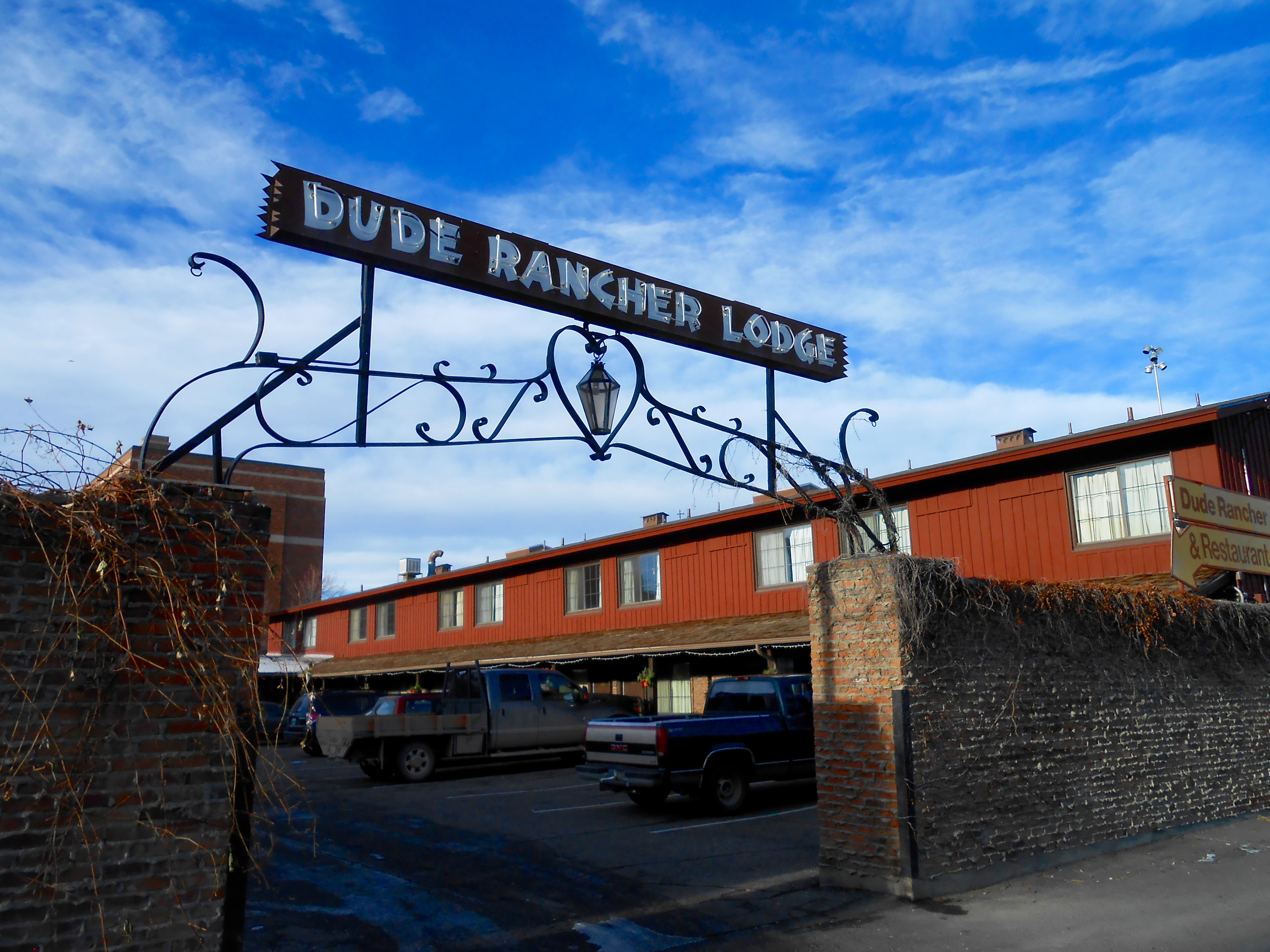
East courtyard entrance. Neon sign was originally on the west side of the building, facing 29th Street.

The motel was built by its original owners, Percival "Percy" and Annabel Goan, who hired architects Cushing & Terrell (Note: This firm is now known as Cushing Terrell and is still in business.) and the Riedesel Construction Company. Everett Terrell was the building designer, working off of the conceptualization of the Goans. They broke ground in April 1950 and opened for business on December 17 of that same year. The design is a two-story "Motor Inn" built in a U-shape with a central courtyard parking lot. The bricks used on the exterior had been salvaged from a number of then-recently demolished Billings structures, including the old St. Vincent's Hospital, the former Washington Public School, and the Russell-Miller Milling Company. The mason was asked to deliberately apply mortar in a rough and "rustic" fashion, called "weeping" mortar. The remaining exterior walls are made mostly of cedar.

The interior, designed by Annabel with help from her daughter, had walls paneled with knotty pine and the carpets had cattle brands woven into the design. Smaller Navajo rugs were used in uncarpeted areas. Rope was used for handrails on the stairs. A small, home-like lounge in the lobby area with exposed fir ceiling joists and a fireplace completed the facility. Furniture with an "Old West" look was custom-designed for the rooms, and the original window drapes featured scenes from Montana history. The original carpet was replaced with a similar design in 1984 when a major remodeling occurred, and the closets on the north wing of the building were torn out and replaced with armoires in order to allow for the bathrooms to be remodeled, but many of the original furnishings remain, particularly on the south wing of the building.

The "Stirrup Coffee Shop" restaurant was also part of the structure, and began operations in the mid-1950s. Its original design also included a custom-made carpet and featured tooled oak furniture with cowhide seats and backs. It contained a soda fountain and patrons could observe food being prepared in the kitchen. Though the restaurant carpeting and some fixtures have changed, the ceiling lights with western images are original to the building, and most of the original tables and chairs are still in use. The horizontal neon sign that once graced the courtyard driveway entrance on North 29th Street was moved to the back entrance in 2000, when a second round of major remodeling occurred. The most significant change to the building occurred that year, when some of the brick on the south exterior wall was covered by board-and batten siding and a new entrance was built. The new south wall, labeled the "branding wall", features actual brands from local area ranches, some applied in 2000 at the 50th anniversary celebration of the motel's opening, and others later, up through 2015.

Dude Rancher Lodge interior

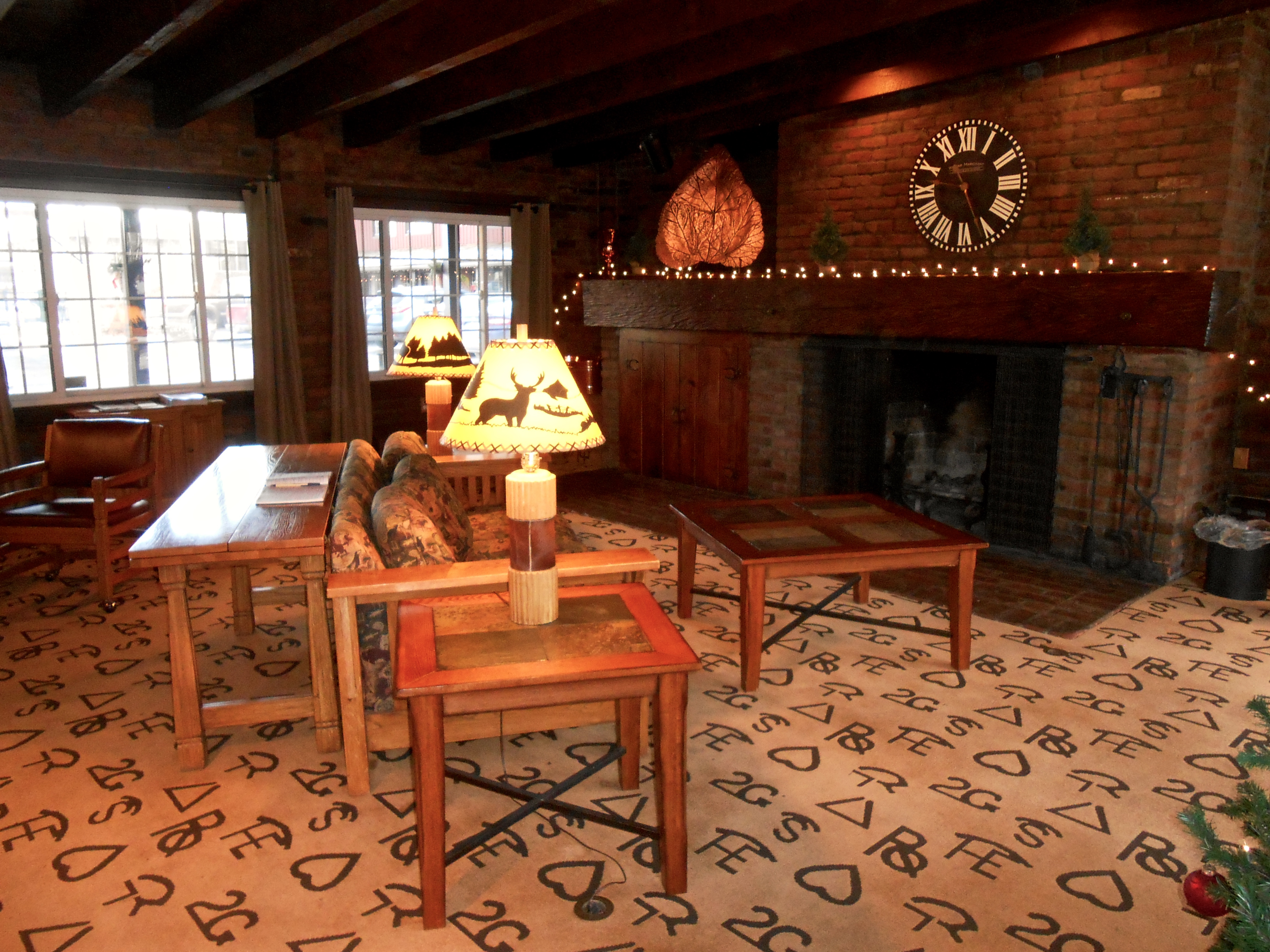
Lobby and fireplace

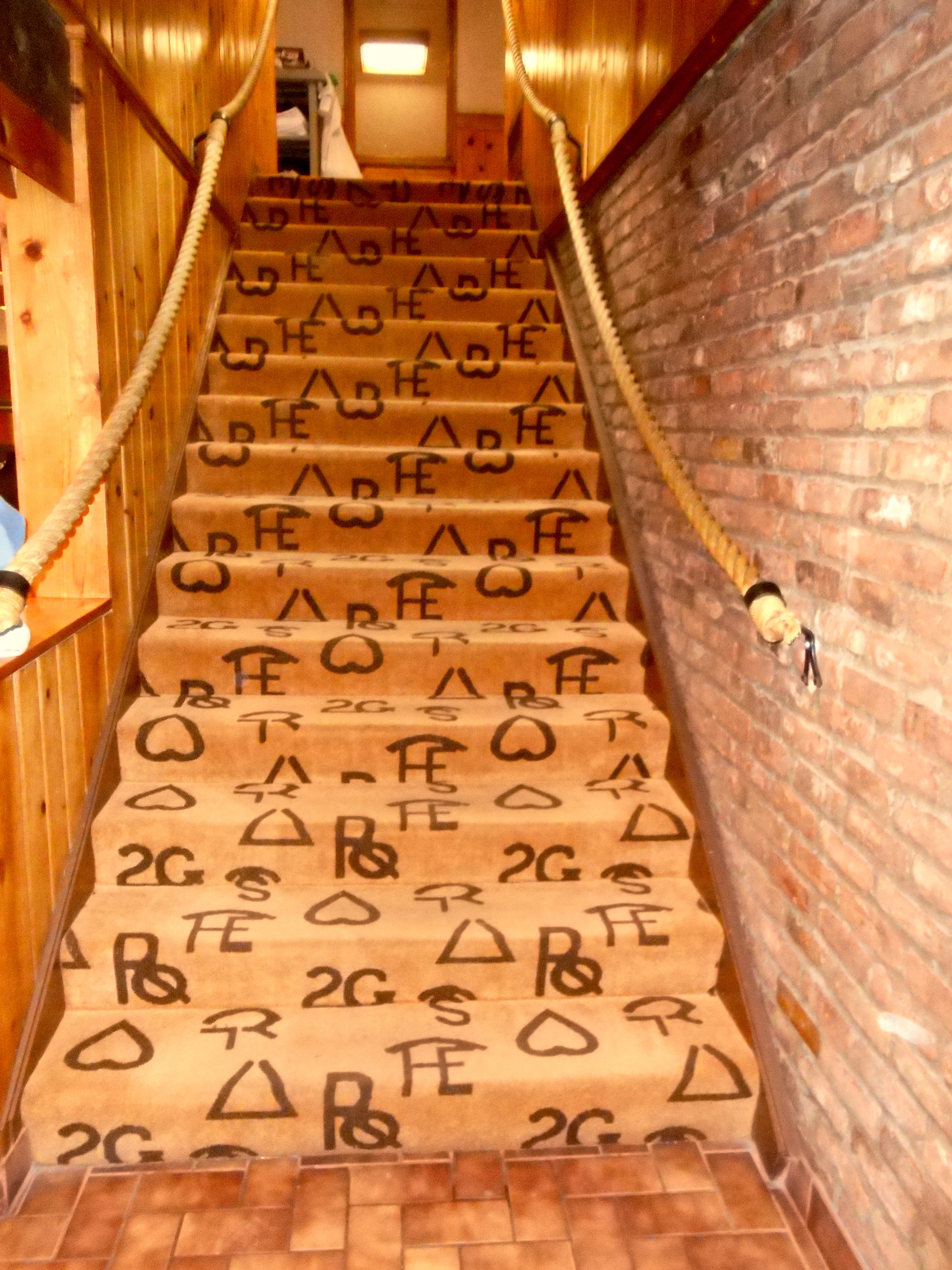
Stairs, showing rope handrails

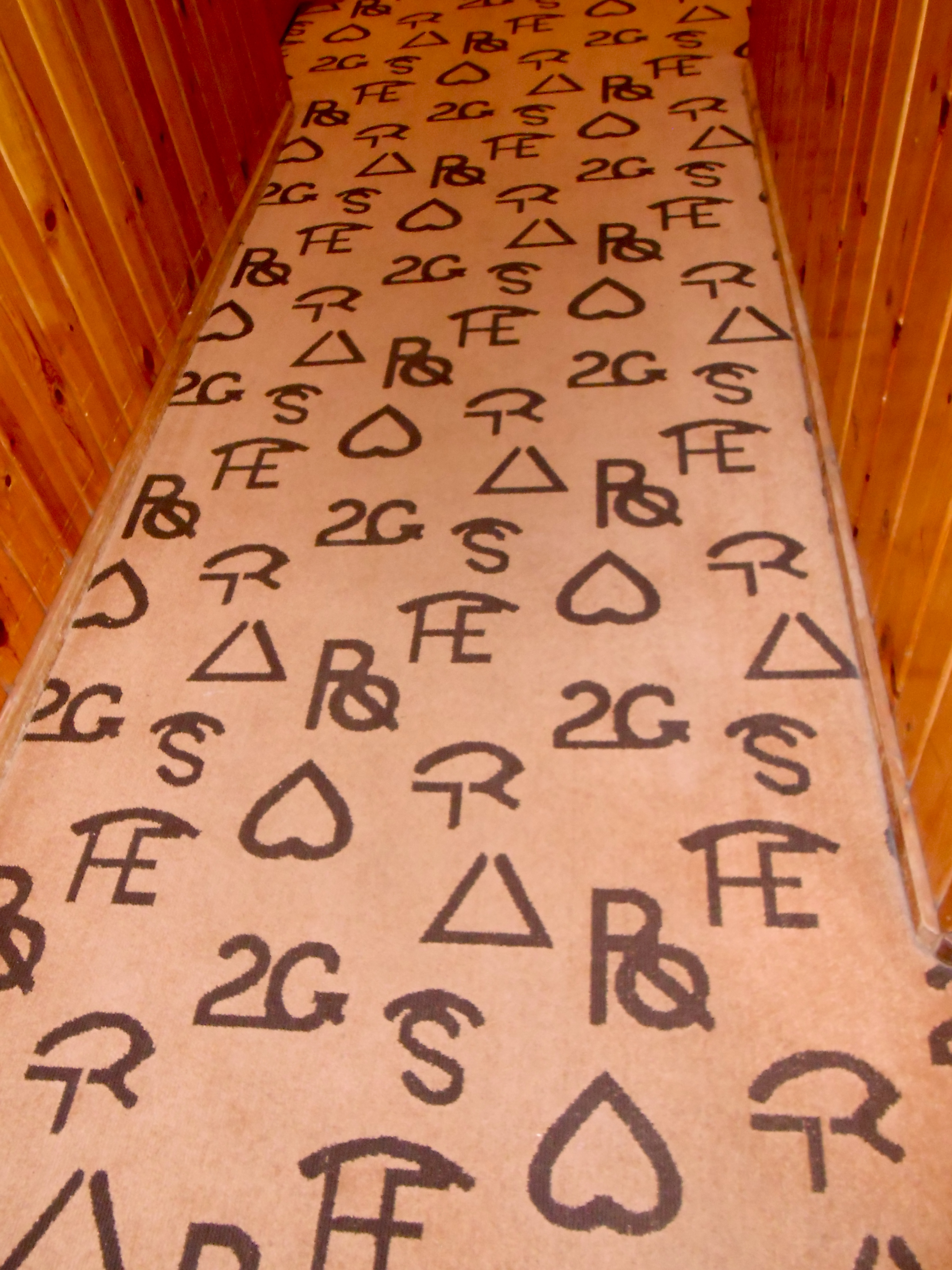
Carpet with ranch brands

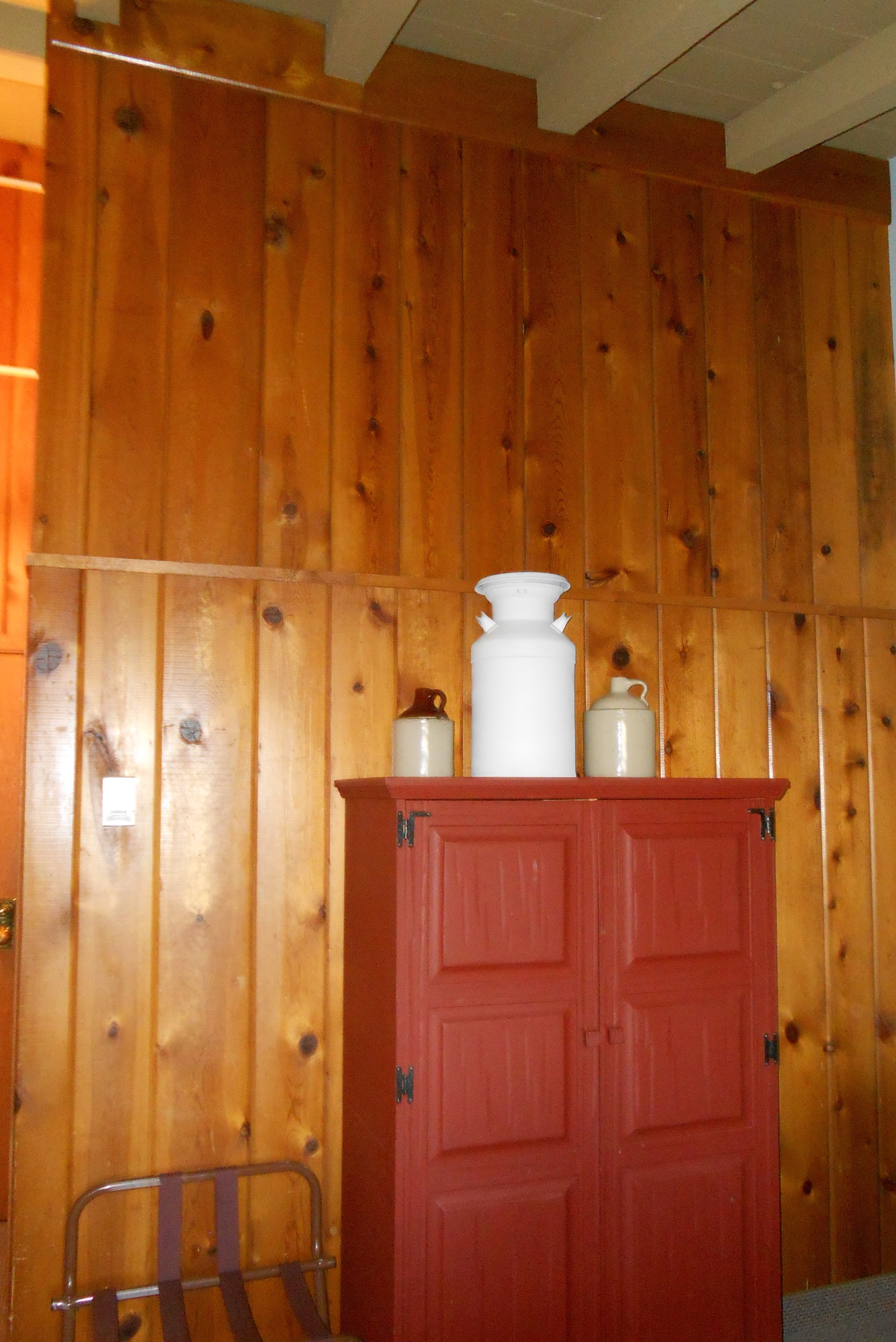
Room detail, showing knotty pine paneling

== Ownership ==
The Dude Rancher Lodge Corporation was formed in 1949 by the Goans, with Percy the President and Annabel the vice-president of the family corporation. Their three grown children, J. Philip ("Phil"), William, and Nancy, were directors and held preferred stock. The corporation also sold 1,500 shares of common stock to help finance the facility. Though local stories say that five area sheep ranchers helped put up the capital for construction, the common stockholders included many members of the local community, including "ranchers, stockmen, retail merchants, wholesalers, bankers, industrialists, insurance agents, doctors, and private investors."

Percy died in 1962, following a car accident; Annabel became President of the family corporation following his death. She remodeled two rooms at the motel into an apartment for herself, and lived at the motel from 1973 until 1982, when she moved into an assisted living home, where she died in 1983. After Annabel died, the family continued to operate the motel until 1992, when they dissolved the family corporation. Son Phil served a term in the Montana Legislature starting in 1962, and died in 2013.

The second and current owner of the Dude Rancher is Virginia Carlsen, who purchased the motel in 1992. Carlsen was originally an engineer, and purchased the motel to have her own business. Of the 53 motels and hotels in Billings as of 2008, the Dude Rancher is one of only 10 that is still owner-operated.

== Publicity ==
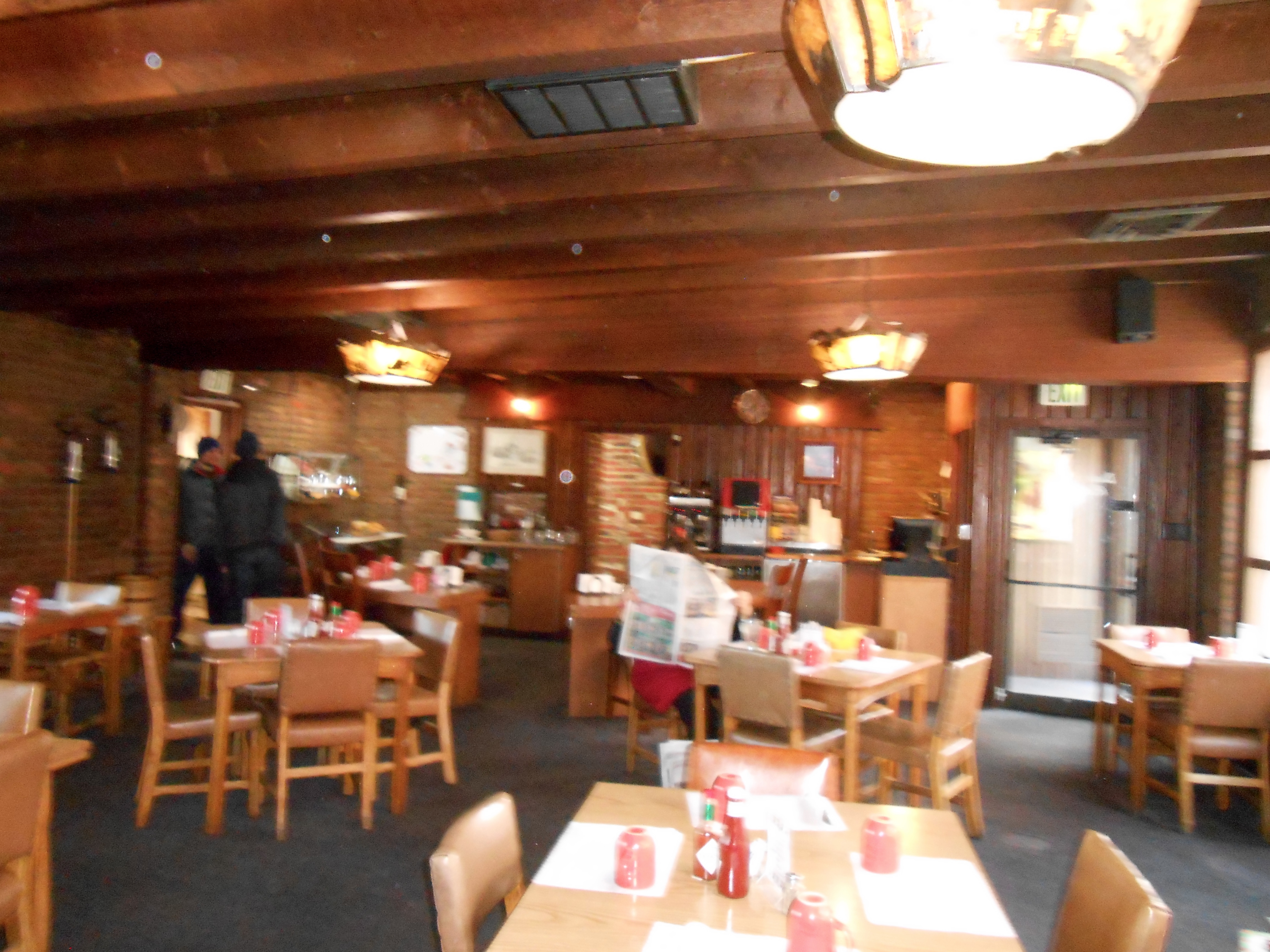
Restaurant in 2015

Prior to opening the Dude Rancher Lodge in 1950, Percy had been a successful Billings businessman, having owned a car dealership, a Nehi beverage distributorship and other entrepreneurial endeavors. When plans were announced for the building, there was considerable press attention paid to the Goan's ideas for a unique and innovative motel. The use of hot water, heat, and air conditioning in every room (not universal at the time) was considered "novel in several respects."

=== Alleged haunting ===
The motel is alleged to be haunted by the ghost of Annabel Goan, and this claim is noted even in the facility's NRHP application. She is said to "watch over" the facility and her former caretaker, Andrea "Andy" Williams, a worker at the motel, stated that the ghost of Annabel does helpful things like unlock stuck doors. Employees report seeing dark shapes flying along a maintenance corridor in the basement. Williams said she also began to see the ghost of a man in a blue shirt in 2013, who usually would walk down a hall toward the kitchen and disappear. Speculation is that the ghost is "Bob", a former cook at the restaurant who had a penchant for making himself late-night snacks. Staff and guest both have reported lights and televisions turning on and off for no apparent reason, knocking on doors with no one there, and sounds and voices with no one present. Paranormal investigators say that reports of hearing children running down the halls could be attributed to "residual energy" from the recycled brick used in constructing the building that came from the elementary school. The Dude Rancher's web site states that room 226 is said to be a particularly active area for paranormal phenomena. It was Annabel's favorite room and still contains all original furniture. Annabel's grandson also lived in that room when he took over operation of the motel after her death. Two neighboring rooms have also had reports of paranormal activity. People who investigate paranormal phenomena describe the Dude Rancher's ghosts as "benign entities... who love their former business, home and place of work." Owner Carlson does not believe in ghosts, but nonetheless offers Halloween package specials at the motel. The three rooms with the most reports of ghostly activity are popular, and sometimes are booked a year in advance.

=== Hotel Impossible episode ===
In 2012, Carlsen invited the television program Hotel Impossible and host Anthony Melchiorri to the motel to look at ways to improve its financial picture, as business had declined since 2007, when a significant increase in number of hotel rooms throughout Billings occurred, creating more competition. The show provided suggestions for improved management, and arranged for local contractors to remodel the front desk area and one of the rooms over a four-day period. Melchiorri also looked at how the motel could make better use of online booking and developed other marketing ideas. Following the July 9 broadcast, online bookings increased by 250 percent and the increased business provided the funds for Carlsen to remodel 14 more rooms in the motel within the year.
