= Graveyard Shift (1987 film) =

- Directed by: Jerry Ciccoritti
- Written by: Jerry Ciccoritti
- Produced by: Robert Bergman; Michael Bockner; Jerry Ciccoritti
- Starring: Michael A. Miranda; Helen Papas
- Cinematography: Robert Bergman
- Edited by: Robert Bergman; Norman Smith
- Music by: Nicholas Pike
- Production company: Cinema Ventures
- Release date: June 12, 1987
- Running time: 89 minutes
- Country: Canada
- Language: English

Graveyard Shift (also titled Central Park Drifter) is a 1987 Canadian horror film written and directed by Jerry Ciccoritti, and starring Michael A. Miranda (billed as Silvio Oliviero) and Helen Papas. The film was originally entitled Graveyard Shift but when the film was released to video, the title was changed to Central Park Drifter (IMDb info). Supporting roles included Coronor (Michael Bokner), Detective Winsome (John Haslett Cuff), Detective Smith (Don James), and Officer Arbus (Lesley Kelly). Jerry Ciccoritti was nominated for Best Film at the Sitges - Catalonian International Film Festival.

== Synopsis ==
Night brings out the hunger in people, especially a mysterious NY cab driver. He is a powerful vampire. And working the night shift brings a sultry array of sensuous passengers within his grasp. Embracing those ready to die, he controls an erratic but well-balanced vampire realm. Then unexpectedly, he discovers erotic human passion-unleashing a raging, terrorizing evil. When a slew of innocent citizens are senselessly slaughtered, the baffled police must solve a 350-year-old mystery of unsated passion.

== Cast ==
- Michael A. Miranda (credited as Silvio Oliviero) as Stephen Tsepes
- Helen Papas as Michelle Hayden
- Cliff Stoker as Eric Hayden
- Dorin Ferber as Gilda
- Dan Rose as Robert Kopple
- John Haslett, Cuff as Det. Winsome
- Don James as Det. Smith
- Michael Bokner as Coronor
- Lesley Kelly as Officer Arbus
- Martin Bockner as Shlr Digger
- Frank Procopio as Marlo Bava
- Kim Cayer as Suzy
- Sugar Bouche as Fabulous Franne
- Jessie Taylor as Swimming Pool Blonde
- Ron Bacardi as Guy in Strip Joint
- Courtland Elliot as Junkyard Nightwatchman

== Production ==
Graveyard Shift was filmed at the end of 1985 with funds raised from New York producers Arnold H. Bruck and Stephen R. Flaks.

== Sequel ==
A sequel, The Understudy: Graveyard Shift II, was announced prior to the first film's release also starring Michael A. Miranda.
