= Hot Pursuit (1987 film) =

1987 film by Steven Lisberger

- Theatrical release poster
- Directed by: Steven Lisberger
- Screenplay by: Steven Lisberger; Steven Carabatsos
- Story by: Steven Lisberger
- Produced by: Pierre David; Theodore R. Parvin
- Starring: John Cusack; Robert Loggia; Wendy Gazelle; Jerry Stiller
- Cinematography: Frank Tidy
- Edited by: Mitchell Sinoway
- Music by: Joseph Conlan; Steve Schaeffer; Tom Scott
- Production company: RKO Pictures
- Distributed by: Paramount Pictures
- Release date: May 8, 1987
- Running time: 92 minutes
- Country: United States
- Language: English
- Budget: $4 million
- Box office: $4.2 million

Hot Pursuit is a 1987 American action comedy film directed by Steven Lisberger, written by Lisberger and Steven Carabatsos, and starring John Cusack, Robert Loggia, Wendy Gazelle, Jerry Stiller and Ben Stiller (in his film debut).

== Plot ==
High school student Dan Bartlett (John Cusack) misses the plane he was supposed to be on with his rich girlfriend and her family on the way to a Caribbean vacation during a school break. He flies there alone, and runs into a series of characters and misadventures as he tries to catch up.

Ganja-smoking island natives give Dan a lift in their vehicle, but they don't quite make it as the family takes off on a chartered yacht. A crusty old sailor (Robert Loggia) with his own reasons takes up the chase with Bartlett on a decrepit sailboat. Bartlett then runs into corrupt cops and winds up in jail. Finally, he catches up to the yacht, only to find that the family has been taken hostage by pirates. He comes to the rescue.

== Cast ==
- John Cusack as Dan Bartlett
- Robert Loggia as "Mac" MacClaren
- Wendy Gazelle as Lori Cronenberg
- Jerry Stiller as Victor Honeywell
- Monte Markham as Bill Cronenberg
- Shelley Fabares as Buffy Cronenberg
- Ben Stiller as Chris Honeywell
- Dah-ve Chodan as Ginger Cronenberg
- Keith David as Alphonso
- Paul Bates as Cleon
- Ursaline Bryant as Roxanne
- Terence Cooper as Captain Andrew
- Martin LaSalle as Prisoner
- Ted White as Tommy Ray

== Production ==
Pierre David developed the project with Steve Lisberger. David brought it to Tom Mankiewicz, who helped produce. RKO Pictures were willing to back the film but they only wanted to pay $2.8 million and filmmakers could not get the budget lower than $4 million. Mankiewicz managed to secure the additional funding from Ned Tanen at Paramount Pictures in exchange for cable rights.

Anthony Michael Hall was considered for the lead before the filmmakers decided to go with John Cusack.

=== Filming ===
The scenes at Dan's school ("Burnham preparatory school for boys") were filmed at St. Michaels University School in Victoria, British Columbia, Canada. A "Victoria Taxi" logo is visible on the cab that Dan takes to the airport.

== Reception ==
According to Mankiewicz, "everyone came out fine" from the film "especially Cusack and Ben Stiller, who went on to bigger and better things". On Rotten Tomatoes the film has a score of 0% based on reviews from 5 critics.
