= Ilse von Glatz =

- Born: Ilse von Glatz; August 21, 1958; Windsor, Ontario, Canada
- Died: May 2, 2014 (aged 55); Toronto, Ontario, Canada
- Occupation: Actress
- Years active: 1985-1990

Ilse von Glatz (August 21, 1958 – May 2, 2014) was a Canadian actress who played an Advocate in the 1988 science fiction TV series War of the Worlds. She also appeared as an employment counsellor in "The Mind of Simon Foster", an episode of the 1985 version of The Twilight Zone). She also appeared in at least one episode of Friday the 13th: The Series in 1989.

== Filmography ==
Year	Title	Role	Notes
1988-1989	War of the Worlds	Advocate	21 episodes
1988	The Understudy: Graveyard Shift II	Ash	
1989	Brown Bread Sandwiches	Ingrid	
1989	Friday the 13th: The Series	Diane	Episode: "The Sweetest Sting"
