= Psycho Girls =

1986 Canadian slasher film

- Directed by: Jerry Ciccoritti
- Written by: Michael Bockner; Jerry Ciccoritti
- Produced by: Robert Bergman; Michael Bockner; Jerry Ciccoritti
- Starring: John Haslett Cuff; Darlene Mignacco; Rose Graham; Agi Gallus; Michael A. Miranda; Pier Giorgio DiCicco
- Cinematography: Robert Bergman
- Edited by: Robert Bergman
- Music by: Joel Rosenbaum
- Distributed by: United Entertainment Pictures
- Release date: 1986
- Running time: 97 minutes
- Country: Canada
- Language: English

Psycho Girls is a 1986 Canadian slasher film directed and co-written by Jerry Ciccoritti and starring John Haslett Cuff, Darlene Mignacco, and Rose Graham. It was shot in Toronto and is Ciccoritti's first feature film.

== Plot ==
A woman escapes from an insane asylum along with two of her fellow inmates, to revenge herself upon her sister.

== Production ==
Psycho Girls was shot over a period of eleven days in 1984 in Toronto. Locations included the Lakeshore Psychiatric Hospital. The budget was $18,000. Of the completed film, the director stated, "It was strictly a means to an end, to establish a name for ourselves. In many ways it's just another run of the mill horror film, made by the numbers."

== Release ==
The film was picked up for distribution by The Cannon Group, Inc. and was part of a large slate of projects written off as a massive loss for the company. The film was released on MGM Home Video in 1986.

A Region A Blu-ray was released in 2023 by Vinegar Syndrome, newly scanned and restored. The disc featured a commentary track with co-writer/director Jerry Ciccoritti and director of photography/editor Robert Bergman, as well as several interview features.

== Reception ==
Writing in Psychotronic Video, Michael J. Waldon noted that the film had "a surprising, bizarre edge," adding "PSYCHO GIRLS is the most warped. It's narrated by a would be scriptwriter, typing lines like "What is money anyway, but paper with germs on it?". His story is about a woman in an asylum since she was a child, for killing her parents by putting rat poison in pancakes(!). She escapes to terrorize her sister, and in a shocking sequence, she and two sadistic, laughing maniacs kill people during a dinner party. The sex and violence is off screen, but still intense. The director shows up as a pizza delivery boy. A character is shown reading The Gore Gazette."
