= Jerry Ciccoritti =

Canadian director (born 1956)

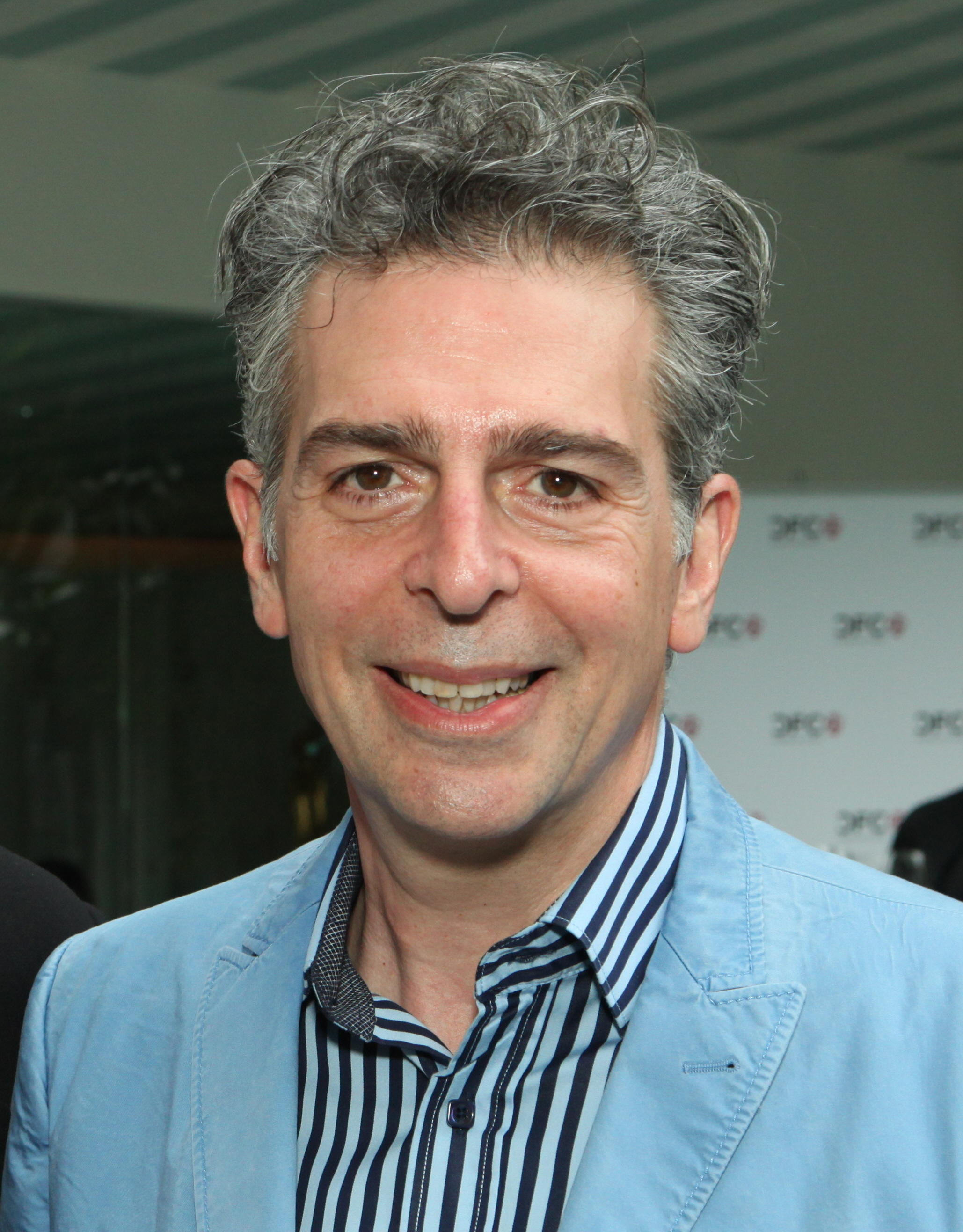
- Ciccoritti at Canadian Film Centre 25th Anniversary Celebration in Los Angeles, March 20, 2013
- Born: August 5, 1956 (age 70); Toronto, Ontario, Canada
- Occupation: Director

Jerry Ciccoritti (born August 5, 1956) is a Canadian director.

== Biography ==
Ciccoritti co-produced, co-wrote, and directed the low-budget horror film Psycho Girls (1985). Several other genre films followed, eventually leading to work in episodic television and television movies. Ciccoritti was instrumental in developing the TV series Catwalk (1992) and Straight Up (1996) and began a secondary career as a director of big-budget television movies and miniseries with Net Worth (1995), a drama about hockey player Ted Lindsay's battles with the National Hockey League on behalf of his fellow players. Another popular film of Ciccoritti's that deals with Canadian history is Trudeau.

== Films ==
His credits include the theatrical films The Life Before This; Blood; The Resurrection of Tony Gitone; and Paris, France. Television films include The Death and Life of Nancy Eaton, Net Worth, Lives of the Saints, Shania: A Life in Eight Albums, Chasing Cain, Trudeau, Victor, and Dragon Boys. He has also directed episodic television, including Bomb Girls, Being Erica, Straight Up, ReGenesis, and King. In 2015, he directed episodes of the CBC sitcom Schitt's Creek. In 2016, he directed three episodes of the television miniseries 21 Thunder, which debuted on CBC in 2017.

== Filmography ==
Directed features
Year	Title
1985	Psycho Girls
1987	Graveyard Shift
1988	The Understudy: Graveyard Shift II
1993	Paris, France
1995	Net Worth
2002	Trudeau
2004	Blood
2005	Murder in the Hamptons
2005	Shania: A Life in Eight Albums
2008	Victor
2008	Wisegal
2008	The Terrorist Next Door
2008	The Call
2009	Killer Hair
2009	Hostile Makeover
2011	John A.: Birth of a Country
2013	The Resurrection of Tony Gitone
2013	Holidaze
2016	Love's Complicated
2019	Lie Exposed
2019	Turkey Drop
2021	Angel Falls Christmas
2021	Two for the Win
2024	Hot Frosty
2025	Joy to the World

== Awards ==
Ciccoritti has been nominated for and won several Gemini Awards, including a record number of wins for Best Director (Television). He won the inaugural Canadian Screen Award for Best Direction in a Dramatic Program or Mini-Series for the CBC TV movie John A.: Birth of a Country.

Blood was nominated for a Genie Award for Best Original Screenplay at the 25th Genie Awards, and Ciccoritti was also nominated for a Directors Award for Best Direction in a Feature Film for the movie. Ciccoritti has won three awards from the Directors Guild of Canada.
