= The Understudy: Graveyard Shift II =

1988 film by Jerry Ciccoritti

- Video release poster
- Directed by: Jerry Ciccoritti
- Written by: Jerry Ciccoritti
- Produced by: Arnold H. Bruck; Stephen R. Flaks
- Starring: Michael A. Miranda; Wendy Gazelle
- Cinematography: Barry Stone
- Edited by: Neil Grieve
- Music by: Philip Stern
- Production company: Cinema Ventures
- Release date: November 1988
- Country: Canada
- Language: English

The Understudy: Graveyard Shift II is a 1988 Canadian direct-to-video horror film directed by Jerry Ciccoritti and starring Michael A. Miranda and Wendy Gazelle. It is the sequel to Graveyard Shift (1987).

== Premise ==
The macho Italian vampire Baisez appears on the set of a low-budget film about vampirism and billiards and seduces the cast and crew.

== Cast ==
- Michael A. Miranda as Baisze (as Silvio Oliviero)
- Wendy Gazelle as Camilla/Patti
- Mark Soper as Matthew
- Ilse von Glatz as Ash
- Tim Kelleher as Duke/Larry
- Leslie Kelly as Martina (as Leslie Kelly)
- Paul Amato as Alan
- Carl Alacchi as Ramoan/Apache

== Production notes ==
The film was shot back-to-back with Graveyard Shift under the original title of Graveyard Shift II: Flesh and Fantasy The film was shot in Toronto, Ontario.
