= Gurney's Inn =

Oceanfront resort in Montauk, New York, United States

Coordinates: 41°00′56″N 71°59′31″W

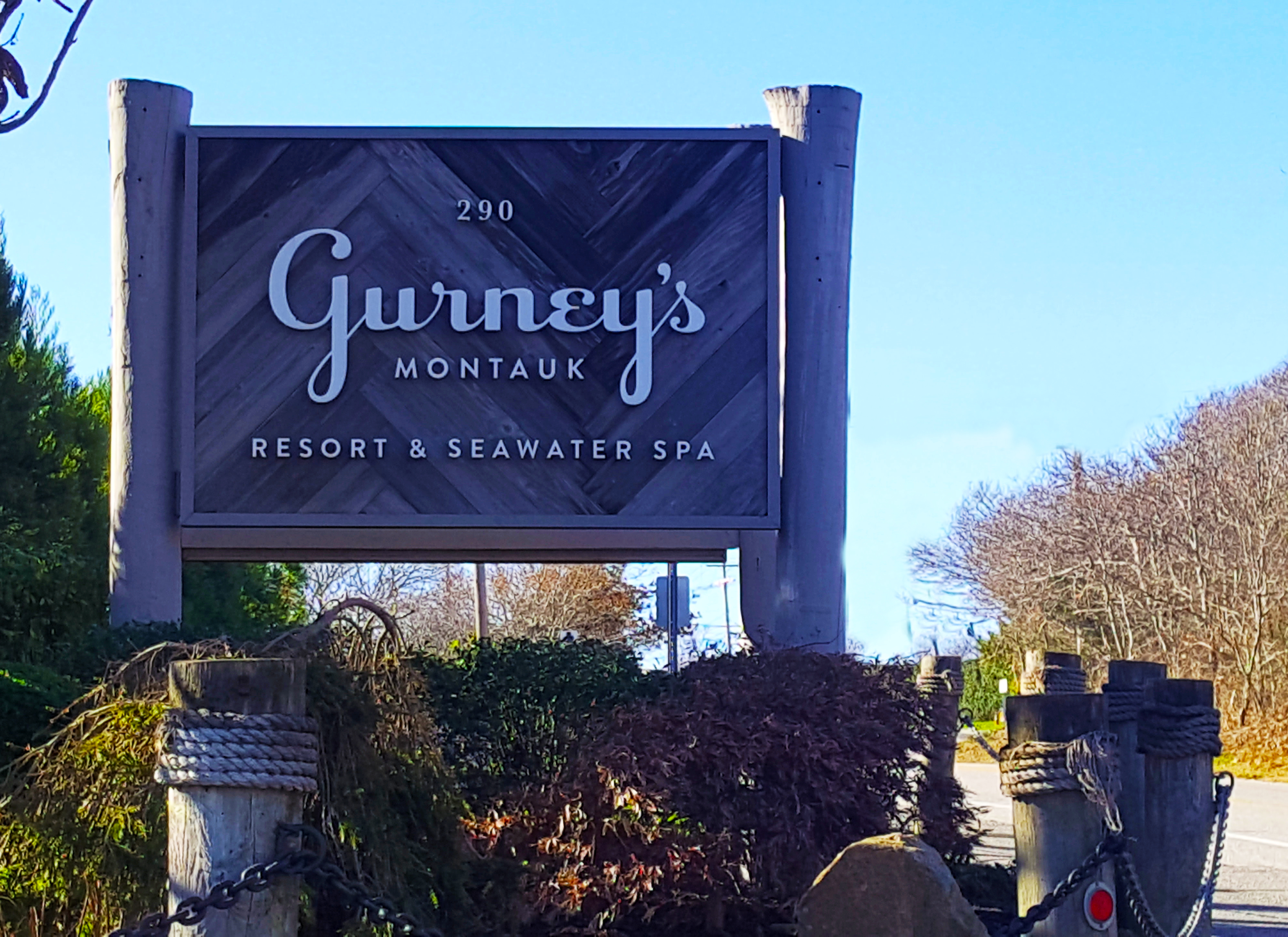
Gurney's Inn Sign

Gurney's Inn is a Long Island oceanfront resort, in Montauk, New York.

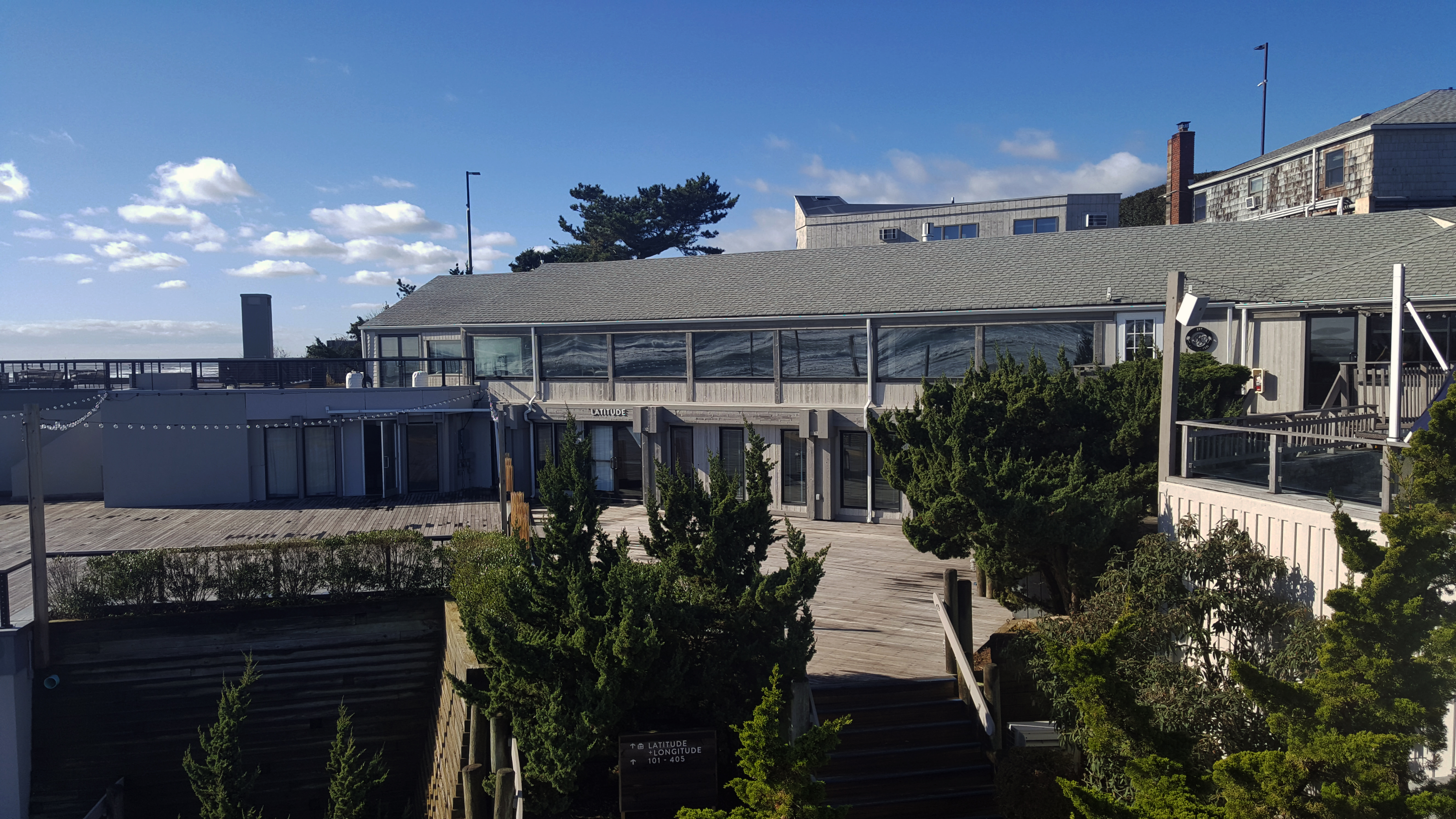
Gurney's Inn

U.S. President Richard Nixon wrote his acceptance speech at the Skippers Cottage at Gurney's Inn.

The oceanfront resort includes a seawater pool and group accommodations for weddings, business meetings and other events.

Gurney's Inn was described on the Travel Channel show Hotel Impossible on April 9, 2012, as not keeping up with the times.

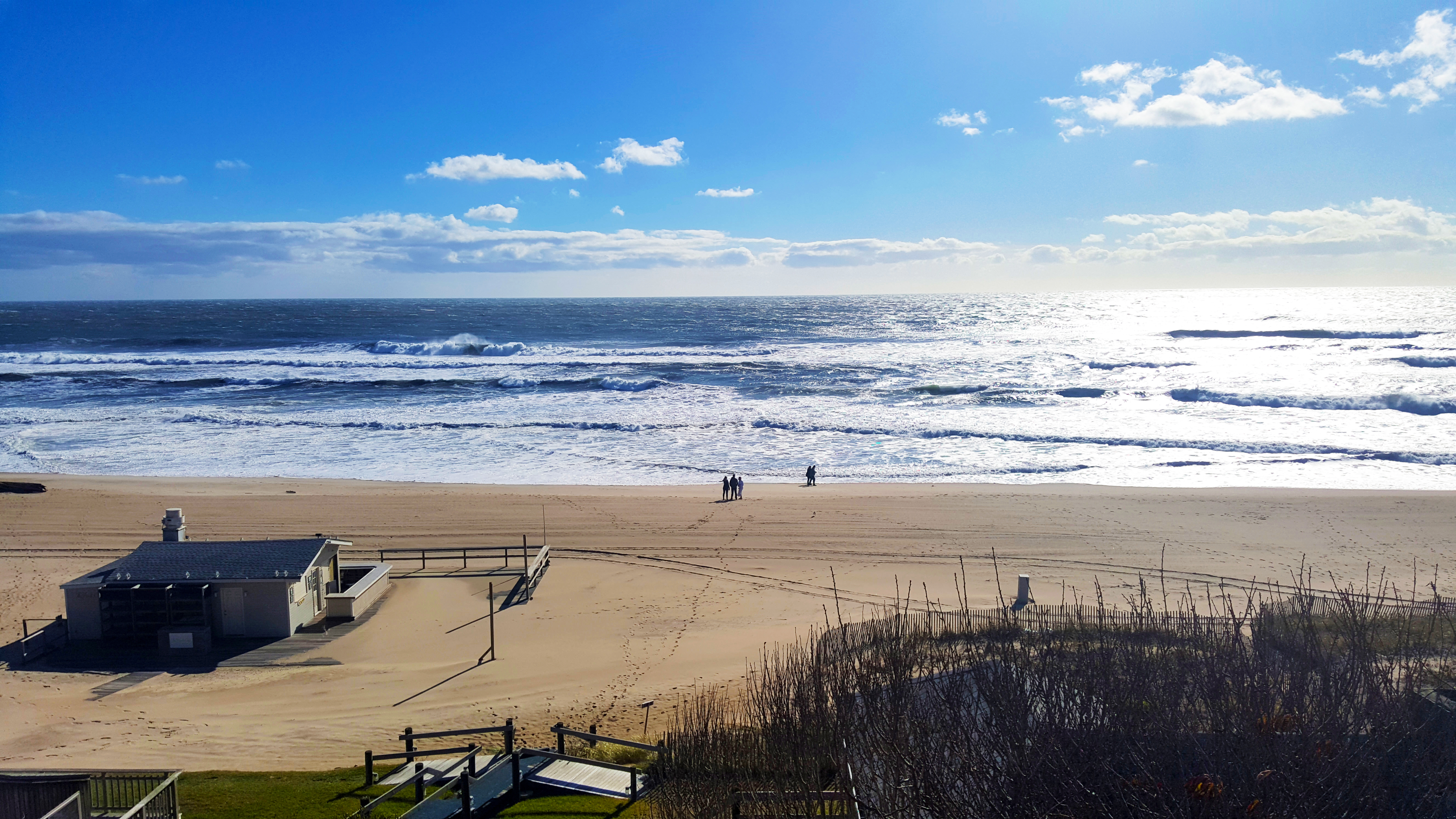
Beach front at Gurney's Inn

In 2015, the resort underwent major renovation, retrofitting and took the name Gurney's Montauk Resort & Seawater Spa. It now features renovated rooms and a large spa. It is the only licensee on the East End allowing it to function as an on ocean beach restaurant.

In 2017, Gurneys Resorts opened their first property outside of Long Island, Gurney's Newport Resort & Marina, in the former Hyatt Regency. It is located on Goat Island in Newport, Rhode Island.

In 2018, the resort acquired the Montauk Yacht Club Resort and Marina, to be renamed as "Gurney's Star Island Resort & Marina".
