= Hotel Impossible =

TV show

- Hotel Impossible logo
- Genre: Reality TV; Documentary
- Starring: Anthony Melchiorri
- No. of seasons: 8
- No. of episodes: 110

Production
- Executive producers: Rob Green; Bruce David Klein; Lorri Leighton
- Production locations: United States; Canada
- Camera setup: Multiple
- Running time: 60 minutes (including commercials)
- Production company: Atlas Media Corp.

Original release
- Network: Travel Channel
- Release: April 9, 2012 – November 13, 2017

Related
- Restaurant: Impossible

Hotel Impossible is a reality television series from Travel Channel in which struggling non-chain hotels received an extensive makeover by veteran hotel operator and hospitality expert Anthony Melchiorri and his team. The show premiered on April 9, 2012, and ended on November 13, 2017. After airing seven seasons, the series launched a spin-off series called Hotel Impossible: Showdown in which four hoteliers of a pre-selected region that visit and judge each other's establishments for the highest ranking and a prize of $25,000. During season 8, another spin-off series called Hotel Impossible: Five Star Secrets began airing. In it, Melchiorri visits luxury resorts, learns what makes them special, and awards a $5,000 super tip to a deserving staff member. The show was not renewed for a new season in 2018 and is "no longer in active production".

== Premise ==
Each episode featured a particular hotel (always independent of a major chain or hotel system) struggling with problems and not living up to its full potential. Twenty-plus year veteran hotelier Anthony Melchiorri secretly scouts each hotel and identifies the property's most urgent issues. He meets with staff, including front desk clerks, housekeeping staff, the maintenance team, and the owners themselves, to determine the key operation failures. Some owners risk losing their hotels if Melchiorri's innovations don't work. After devising a plan for physical, cosmetic, and procedural changes with his designer (usually Casey Noble or former Design Star contestant Blanche Garcia), Melchiorri works to revamp the hotel and its usually biggest problem—the hotel owners themselves.

Hotel Impossible was renewed for a second season by the Travel Channel in September 2012. A special titled After Anthony aired on February 4, 2013, reviewing the hotels visited in the first season. The third season debuted on August 12, 2013. In January 2014, before the fourth season debuted, a series of six half-hour follow-up episodes titled Hotel Impossible Undercover revisited individual hotels from previous seasons. The fourth season debuted January 27, 2014, the fifth season on October 7, 2014.

Season 6 was broadcast in 2015, consisting of 13 episodes, one of which marked a return to Myrtle Beach, South Carolina.

== Episodes ==
=== Series overview ===
Season	Episodes	Originally released	
Season	Episodes	First released	Last released
1	13	April 9, 2012	August 6, 2012
2	14	December 3, 2012	March 25, 2013
3	13	August 12, 2013	November 4, 2013
Undercover	6	January 6, 2014	January 20, 2014
4	13	January 27, 2014	June 9, 2014
5	12	October 7, 2014	January 13, 2015
6	13	September 1, 2015	November 24, 2015
7	13	April 18, 2016	August 1, 2016
8	13	October 24, 2016	November 13, 2017

=== Season 1 (2012) ===
No. overall	No. in season	Title	Original release date
1	1	"Gurney's Inn – Montauk, New York"	April 9, 2012
2	2	"Penguin Hotel – South Beach, Florida"	April 16, 2012
3	3	"Hotel New Yorker – Miami, Florida"	April 23, 2012
4	4	"Purple Orchid Wine Country Resort & Spa – Livermore, California"	April 30, 2012
5	5	"Ocean Manor Resort – Fort Lauderdale, Florida"	May 7, 2012
6	6	"Hotel Corpus Christi Bayfront – Corpus Christi, Texas"	May 14, 2012
7	7	"La Jolla Cove Suites – La Jolla, California"	May 28, 2012
8	8	"Southern Oaks Inn – Branson, Missouri"	June 4, 2012
9	9	"Fiddler's Inn – Nashville, Tennessee"	June 11, 2012
10	10	"Newport Spa & Whirlpool Suites – Newport, Rhode Island"	June 25, 2012
11	11	"Dude Rancher Lodge – Billings, Montana"	July 9, 2012
12	12	"Vermont Inn – Mendon, Vermont"	July 23, 2012
13	13	"Dream Inn – Daytona Beach, Florida"	August 6, 2012

=== Season 2 (2012–13) ===
No. overall	No. in season	Title	Original release date
14	1	"Caribe Playa Beach Resort – Patillas, Puerto Rico"	December 3, 2012
15	2	"Triangle T Ranch – Dragoon, Arizona"	December 10, 2012
16	3	"Maui Sunseeker Resort – Maui, Hawaii"	December 17, 2012
17	4	"Hotel Léger – Mokelumne Hill, California"	January 7, 2013
18	5	"Glacier Bear Lodge – Yakutat, Alaska"	January 14, 2013
19	6	"Telemark Resort & Convention Center – Cable, Wisconsin"	January 21, 2013
20	7	"Periwinkle Inn – Cape May, New Jersey"	January 28, 2013
21	S00	"After Anthony Special"	February 4, 2013
Six hotels from the first season are revisited to see how they are operating since Anthony's visits to each: The Ocean Manor Resort, Dude Rancher Lodge, The Purple Orchid Wine Country Resort & Spa, The Dream Inn, La Jolla Cove Suites and The Hotel New Yorker.
22	8	"Curve Hotel – Palm Springs, California"	February 11, 2013
23	9	"Casa Verde Hotel – Rincon, Puerto Rico"	February 18, 2013
24	10	"Gardenia Resort – Negril, Jamaica"	March 4, 2013
25	11	"Alpenhof Lodge – Mammoth Lakes, California"	March 11, 2013
26	12	"Bromley Sun Lodge – Peru, Vermont"	March 18, 2013
27	13	"Western Riviera Lodge – Grand Lake, Colorado"	March 25, 2013

=== Season 3 (2013) ===
No. overall	No. in season	Title	Original release date
28	1	"Crack Vials and Denials" "Abacrombie Inn – Baltimore, Maryland"	August 12, 2013
29	2	"Greece Lightning" "Litohoro Olympus Resort – Greece"	August 19, 2013
30	3	"Fire Drill Flame Out" "Gadsden Hotel – Douglas, Arizona"	August 26, 2013
31	4	"Tropical Termites" "Hotel Iguanazul – Santa Cruz, Costa Rica"	September 2, 2013
32	5	"Shotgun Start" "Water Gap Country Club Resort – Delaware Water Gap, Pennsylvania"	September 9, 2013
33	6	"Running on Empty" "Holbrooke Hotel – Grass Valley, California"	September 16, 2013
34	7	"Boardwalk Gold" "Lankford Hotel – Ocean City, Maryland"	September 23, 2013
35	8	"In the Doghouse" "Beachfront Inn – Baileys Harbor, Wisconsin"	September 30, 2013
36	9	"Don't Bug Me" "Sevilla Inn – Kissimmee, Florida"	October 7, 2013
37	10	"Niagara Falls Down" "Ritz Inn – Niagara Falls, Ontario"	October 14, 2013
38	11	"Operation Sandy, Part 1" "Thunderbird Motel – Seaside Heights, New Jersey"	October 21, 2013
39	12	"Operation Sandy, Part 2" "Thunderbird Motel, Charlroy Motel, Palm Villa Suites, and Tradewinds Motor Lodge – Seaside Heights, New Jersey"	October 28, 2013
In Operation Sandy, Anthony is seen walking out from the Thunderbird Motel without making any changes to it, thus making it the first time Anthony has failed to remake a hotel. This is also the first time Anthony has attempted to remake more than one hotel for one episode.
40	13	"Crap Out" "Victorian Inn – Sparks, Nevada"	November 4, 2013

=== Hotel Impossible Undercover (2014) ===
No. overall	No. in season	Title	Original release date
41	1	"Glacier Bear Lodge Undercover"	January 6, 2014
42	2	"Hotel Leger Undercover"	January 6, 2014
43	3	"Casa Verde Hotel Undercover"	January 13, 2014
44	4	"Triangle T Ranch Undercover"	January 13, 2014
45	5	"Ocean Manor Resort Undercover"	January 20, 2014
46	6	"Holbrooke Hotel Undercover"	January 20, 2014

=== Season 4 (2014) ===
No. overall	No. in season	Title	Original release date
47	1	"Alaskan Heavyweights" "Alaskan Hotel and Bar – Juneau, Alaska"	January 27, 2014
48	2	"Owner Overboard" "Creekside Inn – Islamorada, Florida"	February 3, 2014
49	3	"Mis-Fortune Hotel" "Fortune Hotel – Las Vegas, Nevada"	February 10, 2014
50	4	"Breaking Point" "Chipman Hill Suites – Saint John, New Brunswick"	February 17, 2014
51	5	"Hollywood Nightmare" "Hollywood Liberty Hotel – Hollywood, California"	February 24, 2014
52	6	"Homestead Hoarders Gone Wild" "Floridian Hotel – Homestead, Florida"	March 3, 2014
53	7	"Temper Expectations" "Catskill Mountain Lodge – Palenville, New York"	April 28, 2014
54	8	"Making Waves" "Carnival Inn – Myrtle Beach, South Carolina"	May 5, 2014
55	9	"The Italian Scallion" "Hotel Solunto Mare – Palermo, Italy"	May 12, 2014
56	10	"Swamped" "High Meadows Inn – Roaring Gap, North Carolina"	May 19, 2014
57	11	"Rat Race" "University Inn at Emory – Atlanta, Georgia"	May 26, 2014
58	12	"Stormy Wedding" "Vagabond Lodge – Hood River, Oregon"	June 2, 2014
59	13	"Airing the Family Business" "Glenwood Motor Inn – Glenwood Springs, Colorado"	June 9, 2014

=== Season 5 (2014–15) ===
No. overall	No. in season	Title	Original release date	U.S. viewers
60	1	"Crash Course in Daytona" "Streamline Hotel – Daytona Beach, Florida"	October 7, 2014	N/A
61	2	"Swinging for the Fences" "Autoport Motel – State College, Pennsylvania"	October 14, 2014	N/A
62	3	"Rotting Woodstock" "Woodstock Lodge – Woodstock, New York"	October 21, 2014	N/A
63	4	"Crappy Management" "Crookston Inn & Convention Center – Crookston, Minnesota"	October 28, 2014	N/A
64	5	"Super Nova Scotia" "Hearthstone Inn – Sydney, Nova Scotia"	November 4, 2014	N/A
65	6	"Masters of My Domain" "Guest House at Houndslake – Aiken, South Carolina"	November 11, 2014	N/A
66	7	"Resort to Spanking" "Mountain View Lodge – Manson, Washington"	November 25, 2014	N/A
67	8	"Packing Heat" "Vacationland Inn – Brewer, Maine"	December 9, 2014	N/A
68	9	"Clearing the Heir" "Ocean Crest Resort – Moclips, Washington"	December 16, 2014	545,000
69	10	"Sleeping on the Job" "CitiGarden Hotel – South San Francisco, California"	December 30, 2014	523,000
70	11	"Getting Screwed" "Missouri Flats Inn – Williston, North Dakota"	January 6, 2015	N/A
71	12	"The Big Sleazy" "Empress Hotel – New Orleans, Louisiana"	January 13, 2015	591,000

=== Season 6 (2015) ===
No. overall	No. in season	Title	Original release date	U.S. viewers
72	1	"Fix Your Kicks on Route 66" "Luxury Inn, Red Garter Inn, and Canyon Motel & RV Park – Flagstaff and Williams, Arizona"	September 1, 2015	N/A
73	2	"Bite Me" "Country Barn Motel & Campground – Nashua, New Hampshire"	September 8, 2015	N/A
74	3	"Not Anice Hotel" "Anice Inn & Suites – Orlando, Florida"	September 15, 2015	N/A
75	4	"To Be or Not To Be" "Stratford Court Hotel – Cedar City, Utah"	September 22, 2015	N/A
76	5	"Hershey Addiction" "Simmons Motel – Hershey, Pennsylvania"	September 29, 2015	N/A
77	6	"Dirty Water Falls" "Waldorf Niagara Hotel – Niagara Falls, New York"	October 6, 2015	N/A
78	7	"Sweating Bullets in Panama" "Las Olas Resort – David, Panama"	October 13, 2015	N/A
79	8	"See Smell by the Seashore" "Sea Shell Motel – Virginia Beach, Virginia"	October 20, 2015	N/A
80	9	"Waterpan-Gate" "Capital Plaza Hotel – Frankfort, Kentucky"	October 27, 2015	N/A
81	10	"Spinning Out of Control" "Grant Hills Motel – Galena, Illinois"	November 3, 2015	N/A
82	11	"A Tall Odor in Myrtle Beach" "Lancer Motel – Myrtle Beach, South Carolina"	November 10, 2015	N/A
83	12	"Underwear, Under Where?" "Brookside Resort – Gatlinburg, Tennessee"	November 17, 2015	N/A
84	13	"Ex Marks The Spot" "Charles Inn – Bangor, Maine"	November 24, 2015	N/A

=== Season 7 (2016) ===
No. overall	No. in season	Title	Original release date	U.S. viewers
85	1	"Hostel Takeover" "Gardner Hotel – El Paso, Texas"	April 18, 2016	N/A
86	2	"Futility Closet" "Sandy Shore Motel – Misquamicut, Rhode Island"	April 25, 2016	N/A
87	3	"Blind Faith" "Winter Haven Suites & Conference Center – Winter Haven, Florida"	May 2, 2016	N/A
88	4	"Rocky Relationships" "Evergreen Motel and Sandman Motel – Libby, Montana"	May 9, 2016	N/A
89	5	"Branson Misery" "Colonial Mountain Inn – Branson, Missouri"	May 16, 2016	N/A
90	6	"No Filter" "Bossier Inn & Suites – Bossier City, Louisiana"	May 23, 2016	N/A
91	7	"Malpractice in Hawaii" "Kauai Inn – Lihue, Hawaii"	May 30, 2016	N/A
92	8	"The Pain in Maine" "Trade Winds Inn – Rockland, Maine"	June 13, 2016	N/A
93	9	"Going Poconowhere" "Bradford Inn – Towanda, Pennsylvania"	June 20, 2016	N/A
94	10	"Tiny Horse, Big Problems" "Big Bear Motel – Cody, Wyoming"	June 27, 2016	N/A
95	11	"Funeral Home Impossible" "Posada de San Juan – San Juan Bautista, California"	July 11, 2016	N/A
96	12	"Anchorless in Anchorage" "Anchorage Lofts Hotel – Anchorage, Alaska"	July 18, 2016	N/A
97	13	"Dirty Pool and Resignations" "Yankee Clipper Inn – North Conway, New Hampshire"	August 1, 2016	N/A

=== Season 8 (2016–17) ===
No. overall	No. in season	Title	Original release date	U.S. viewers
98	1	"Full Throttle in Sturgis" "Ponderosa Motor Lodge, Cedar Wood Inn, and Recreational Springs Resort – Sturgis, South Dakota"	October 24, 2016	N/A
99	2	"Fire Island Meltdown" "Clegg's Hotel – Fire Island, New York"	October 31, 2016	N/A
100	3	"Lions, Tigers and Wasps, Oh My!" "Turpentine Creek Wildlife Refuge – Eureka Springs, Arkansas"	November 7, 2016	N/A
101	4	"Alarmed in Alaska" "Hooligan's Lodge – Soldotna, Alaska"	November 14, 2016	N/A
102	5	"Rocky's Hot Tub Horror Show" "Cocca's Inn & Suites – Albany, New York"	November 21, 2016	N/A
103	6	"Jersey Shore Uproar" "White Caps Motel – Wildwood, New Jersey"	November 28, 2016	N/A
104	7	"Lake Superior, Hotel Inferior" "Greunke's First Street Inn & Restaurant – Bayfield, Wisconsin"	December 5, 2016	N/A
–	–	"Ice Hotels... Not Impossible (special)" "Icehotel, Snow Village, Kakslauttanen Arctic Resort, and Snowhotel – Sweden, Finland, and Norway"	December 26, 2016	N/A
105	8	"Outer Banks-Ruptcy" "Cape Hatteras Motel – Cape Hatteras, North Carolina"	October 2, 2017	N/A
106	9	"Kentucky Conundrum" "Sunrise Inn – Williamstown, Kentucky"	October 9, 2017	N/A
107	10	"Desert Disaster" "Cambridge Inn – Palm Springs, California"	October 16, 2017	N/A
108	11	"Chaos on the Cape" "Beach 'n' Towne Motel – South Yarmouth, Massachusetts"	October 30, 2017	N/A
109	12	"West Coast Wipe Out" "Oceana Boutique Hotel – San Clemente, California"	November 6, 2017	N/A
110	13	"Waterpark Bug-Out" "Maui Sands Resort & Indoor Waterpark – Sandusky, Ohio"	November 13, 2017	N/A

== See also ==
- Hotel Hell
- The Hotel Inspector
