= Wisegal =

- Promotional image
- Written by: Shelley Evans
- Directed by: Jerry Ciccoritti
- Starring: Alyssa Milano; James Caan; Jason Gedrick
- Music by: John Frizzell
- Country of origin: United States
- Original language: English

Production
- Executive producers: Joseph D. Pistone; Leo Rossi
- Producers: Terry Gould; Alyssa Milano
- Cinematography: Gerald Packer
- Editor: George Roulston
- Running time: 89 minutes
- Production companies: Daniel H. Blatt Productions; Forrest and Forrest Casting

Original release
- Network: Lifetime
- Release: March 15, 2008

Wisegal is a 2008 American made-for-television crime drama film directed by Jerry Ciccoritti and starring Alyssa Milano, James Caan and Jason Gedrick. The film premiered on Lifetime on March 15, 2008.

== Plot ==
The story is narrated by an adult Nino Montanari, who reminisces on his family history...

Brooklyn, New York, ca. 1976: Angie resists abandoning baby daughter Patty on a cathedral doorstep and decides to raise her alone in the streets, surviving by their wits. Years later, a teenaged Patty meets and marries kind policeman Dante Montanari, and the couple have two sons: Joey and Nino.

Dante eventually dies of cancer, and the hospital bills have now left the surviving family without any money. Patty must now make ends meet. She quickly befriends local funeral director Frank Russo, with whom she has a romantic relationship, and Frank's boss Salvatore “Sal” Palmeri, with whom she has a business relationship.

Frank uses his persistent and persuasive charms to reel Patty into his world of organized crime. He offers her a job running a floundering Italian restaurant, which she converts into a successful transvestite nightclub. Sal attends opening night and he is impressed with her business savvy and street smarts. He soon assigns her to serve as his mule; she must drive to Toronto and pick up half-a-million dollars at a shipboard casino. Patty successfully delivers Sal his money, and soon gains his confidence.

Later, Patty and Sal's girlfriend June must make the same trip to Canada together. En route, Patty witnesses June repeatedly snorting cocaine. While Patty is making her usual pick-up, the casino is raided by police, but she manages to slip through their fingers and return to the hotel where June impatiently waits.

Back in Brooklyn, Frank's son Mouse has been selling cocaine in the neighborhood. The teenage boy soon shows up at Patty's doorstep afraid that his father will beat him up again for not 'staying clean'. Shortly thereafter, a newspaper headline reveals that Mouse has been murdered.

During Mouse's funeral, Patty watches from a distance as the procession leaves the wake. FBI agent Robert Wilford approaches Patty for help in bringing down Sal's criminal empire. Robert asks that Patty wear a wire to record incriminating evidence that will facilitate Palmeri's arrest.

Soon, Patty discovers that June had turned Mouse on to selling her drugs, and that Palmeri had placed a hit on him for selling it on the streets. Patty also finds out that Frank asked his boss for permission to, mercifully, kill his own son. June is now fleeing for her life, but Patty intercepts her at her apartment, and finds out that she, June, and Frank are probably the next on Palmeri's hit list.

Eventually, Patty persuades Palmeri to let her go free and to not kill Frank unless he continues threatening her family. Soon thereafter, Palmeri and his men are either arrested or killed, and June's dead body is discovered (presumably from a drug overdose).

The Montanaris and Angie hop on the next train to Florida, leaving their criminal past behind.

== Cast ==
- Alyssa Milano as Patty Montanari
- Jason Gedrick as Frank Russo
- James Caan as Salvatore Palmeri
- Janet Wright as Angie
- Gabriel Hogan as FBI Agent Robert Wilford
- Anthony Melchiorri as Uncle Tito
- Kyle Harrington as Nino Montanari
- Anthony Moniz Lancione as young Nino Montanari
- Alessandro Costantini as Joey Montanari
- Louca Tassone as Young Joey Montanari
- Heather Hanson as June
- Zak Longo as Mouse Russo
- Tulsi Balram as Singer
- Jason Blicker as Dante Montanari

== Credits ==
- Executive Producers – Daniel H. Blatt, Joseph Pistone, Leo Rossi and Anthony Melchiorri
- Producers – Alyssa Milano and Terry Gould
- Co-Producer – Danielle McVickers
- Teleplay – Shelley Evans
- Director – Jerry Ciccoritti
- Director of Photography – Gerald Packer
- Production Designer – Franco de Cotiis
- Editor – George Roulston
- Music – John Frizzell
- Casting – Stacey Rosen

== Reception ==
Variety wrote that "seeing Milano with wads of unmarked bills taped under her breasts is the equivalent of two taste treats in one." The Hollywood Reporter stated Wisegal is above the Lifetime Original Movie average and said "it's engrossing, if sometimes a bit off the rails in terms of plausibility. It also offers genuinely solid performances, headed by Milano as a butt-kicking heroine along with effective work from bad-dude supreme Jason Gedrick and the ageless James Caan, who seems to speak increasingly softly as the years pile up." The Philadelphia Inquirer wrote "Milano is perfect as the tough-gal mom, all feisty and take-charge, even if she can't see the future like good witch Phoebe Halliwell, whom she played in the WB's beloved Charmed."

== Release ==
The film was released on DVD in 2008.
