= Alaskan Hotel and Bar =

- Alaskan Hotel
- U.S. National Register of Historic Places
- U.S. Historic district – Contributing property
- Alaska Heritage Resources Survey
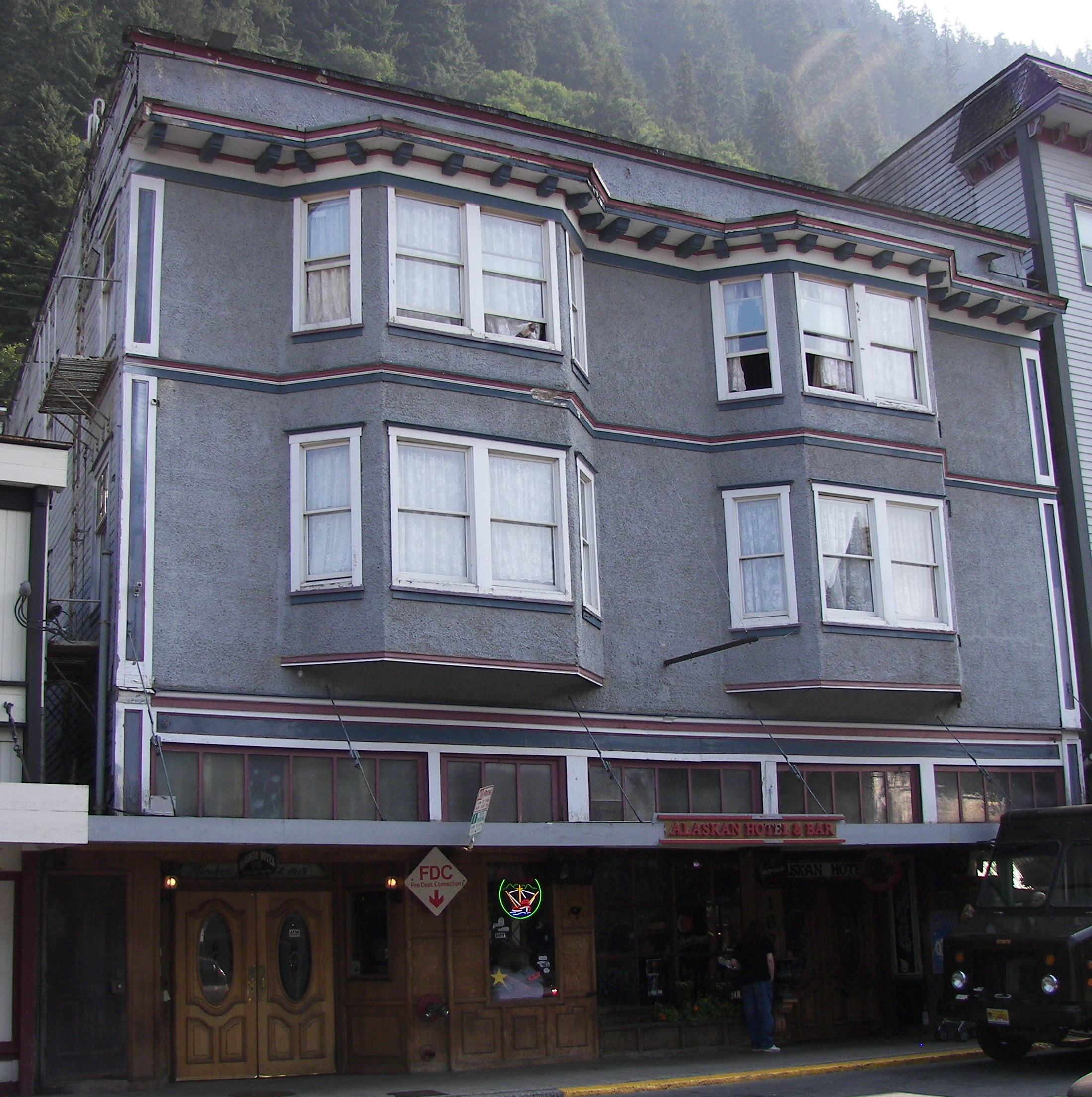

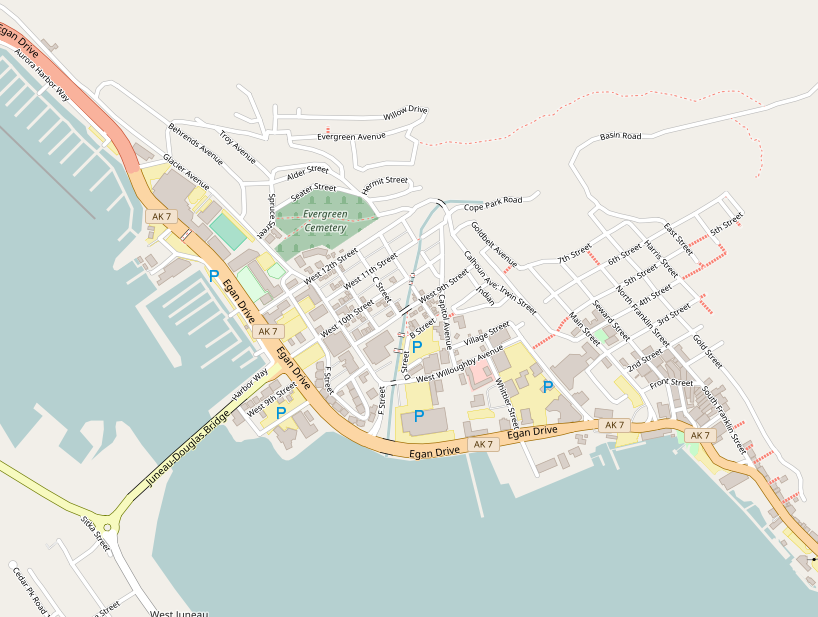
- Location within Juneau Location within Alaska
- Location: 167 South Franklin Street, Juneau, Alaska
- Coordinates: 58°18′1″N 134°24′18″W
- Area: less than one acre
- Built: 1912
- Built by: McCloskey Brothers; Jules B. Caro
- Part of: Juneau Downtown Historic District (ID94000603)
- NRHP reference No.: 78000526
- AHRS No.: JUN-125

Significant dates
- Added to NRHP: October 25, 1978
- Designated CP: June 17, 1994
- Designated AHRS: May 10, 1977

The Alaskan Hotel and Bar, also known as the Northlander Hotel and The Alaskan, is a historic establishment and the oldest operating hotel in Juneau, Alaska. It was opened in 1913. The owners, three miners who struck it rich in the nearby Coast Range, tied the hotel's keys to a helium balloon and released it, signifying that the hotel would never close. The building was briefly condemned in the 1970s, but was rehabilitated by the new owners.

The building was listed on the National Register of Historic Places in 1978 and was included as a contributing property to Juneau Downtown Historic District in 1994.

In 2003, the Food Network show Food Finds filmed a segment at the establishment. In September 2013, the Travel Channel program Hotel Impossible filmed an episode at the hotel.

== See also ==
- National Register of Historic Places listings in Juneau, Alaska
