= Wendy Gazelle =

American actress (active 1985–2009)

- Occupation: Actress
- Years active: 1985–2009
- Spouse: John Ales

Wendy Gazelle is an American former actress, active from 1985 to 2009.

== Career ==
Gazelle first film role was a minor role in the 1985 film Remo Williams: The Adventure Begins.

Gazelle had a small role in the 1995 movie The Net.

== Personal life ==
Gazelle married John Ales on 17 March 2001.

== Filmography ==
=== Movies ===
- 1985 - Remo Williams: The Adventure Begins
- 1987 - Hot Pursuit, Sammy and Rosie Get Laid
- 1988 - The In Crowd, The Understudy: Graveyard Shift II
- 1989 - Triumph of the Spirit
- 1991 - Queens Logic, Crooked Hearts
- 1994 - Benders
- 1995 - The Net
- 1997 - Dead Men Can't Dance

=== TV Movies ===
- 1993 - Victim of Love: The Shannon Mohr Story
- 1997 - Tell Me No Secrets

=== Serials ===
- 1987 - The Cosby Show, Crime Story
- 1992 - Brooklyn Bridge
- 1995 - The Single Guy
- 1996 - Chameleon
- 1997 - Visitor, Nothing Sacred, Lawyers
- 1999 – Doctors from LA, Get Real, The Smurfs
- 2000 - Fugitive
- 2001 – Emergency, The X-Files
- 2002 – Lawyers, For the People
- 2004 – CSI: Las Vegas, House
- 2005 - Surgeons
- 2006 – Messenger of Lost Souls, Murderous Numbers
- 2008 - Boston Legal
- 2009 – Private Practice, Eastwick

=== Video Games ===
- 1993 - Double Switch
