= Sammy and Rosie Get Laid =

1987 British film directed by Stephen Frears

- Theatrical release poster
- Directed by: Stephen Frears
- Written by: Hanif Kureishi
- Produced by: Tim Bevan; Sarah Radclyffe
- Starring: Shashi Kapoor; Frances Barber; Claire Bloom; Ayub Khan-Din; Roland Gift; Wendy Gazelle
- Cinematography: Oliver Stapleton
- Music by: Stanley Myers
- Production companies: FilmFour International; Working Title Films
- Distributed by: Palace Pictures
- Release dates: 13 September 1987 (Toronto International Film Festival); 30 October 1987 (New York)
- Running time: 101 minutes
- Country: United Kingdom
- Language: English
- Budget: £1.3 million

Sammy and Rosie Get Laid is a 1987 British romantic comedy-drama film directed by Stephen Frears and starring Shashi Kapoor and Frances Barber, with a screenplay by Hanif Kureishi.

== Plot ==
Sammy and Rosie are a married couple, both leading a promiscuous bohemian lifestyle until Sammy's father, Rafi, comes to visit to escape past issues.

== Cast ==
- Shashi Kapoor as Rafi
- Frances Barber as Rosie
- Claire Bloom as Alice
- Ayub Khan-Din as Sammy
- Roland Gift as Danny
- Wendy Gazelle as Anna
- Meera Syal as Rani
- Suzette Llewellyn as Vivia
- Lesley Manville as Margy
- Allister Bain as father
- Cleo Sylvestre as mother
- Gerard Horan as restaurant manager

== Release ==
The film was screened at the Toronto International Film Festival and the Vancouver International Film Festival before opening in New York on 30 October 1987. In the United States, it was released as Sammy and Rosie. The film was the closing gala at the London Film Festival on 29 November 1987.
