= Anthony Melchiorri =

TV personality

- Born: May 24, 1965 (age 61); Brooklyn, New York, U.S.
- Occupation: Hospitality expert
- Years active: 2012–present
- Website: anthonymelchiorri.com

Anthony Melchiorri (born May 24, 1965) is a hospitality expert and television personality. He is the creator, co-executive producer, and host of the Travel Channel's hotel turnaround show Hotel Impossible.

== Early life and education ==
Melchiorri was born in Brooklyn, New York, and raised in its Sheepshead Bay neighborhood. He served in the U.S. Air Force.

== Career ==
Melchiorri's first job in the hospitality industry was at the Embassy Suites as a night auditor in Overland Park, Kansas. Ten months later he became a night manager at New York City's Plaza Hotel. Over the next four years he worked his way up to the position of Director of Front Office Operations. After an 11-year-old girl came into the Plaza and asked him, "Mister, where's Eloise?", he and Randee Glick created the hotel's Eloise tour.

He was appointed general manager of the Lucerne Hotel on the Upper West Side of New York City. Under his direction the Lucerne was selected as the New York Times Travel Guide's Best Service Hotel.

In 2005 he left the Lucerne to become general manager of New York's historic Algonquin Hotel. After convincing the owners to close the Algonquin for 29 days, he oversaw a $15 million full renovation of the building and its image, restoring it to the glory days of the famous Algonquin Round Table. He updated the rooms, repositioned the restaurants, and earned the hotel a high rating as a Michelin Guide Hotel. He orchestrated publicity campaigns such as the Algonquin's "$10,000 Martini", won a Hospitality Sales & Marketing Association International "Best of Show Award", and promoted the renovated hotel overall. He helped manage the Nickelodeon Hotel and Resort. He became first vice president of Tishman Hotels and later the senior vice president of New York Hotel Management Company. In this capacity, he helped to develop a 310 all-suite hotel in Times Square.

Melchiorri then founded his own hotel management and consultancy, Argeo Hospitality.

== Hotel Impossible ==
Melchiorri was an executive producer of the 2008 Lifetime cable-movie Wisegal which stars Alyssa Milano. Melchiorri and fellow Wisegal executive producer Leo Rossi, whom he knew from the hospitality industry, developed Melchiorri's idea for a hotel-improvement show. It became the Travel Channel series Hotel Impossible. Each episode features a hotel with problems that he and his team must deal with in less than a week. The series debuted in 2012 and ran for eight seasons. He hosted Extreme Hotels for its two seasons.
