= List of Quebec films =

This is a list of films produced and co-produced in Quebec, Canada ordered by year of release. Although the majority of Quebec films are produced in French due to Quebec's predominantly francophone population, a number of English language films are also produced in the province.

== 1930s ==
English title	French title	Director	Ref
1930
Dans le bois	Dans le bois	Albert Tessier	
1934
Rhapsody in Two Languages		Gordon Sparling	
1935
Gloire à l'eau	Gloire à l'eau	Albert Tessier	
1937
En pays neufs - Un documentaire sur l'Abitibi	En pays neufs - Un documentaire sur l'Abitibi	Maurice Proulx	
1938
Hommage à notre paysannerie	Hommage à notre paysannerie	Albert Tessier	
1939
En pays pittoresque - Un documentaire sur la Gaspésie	En pays pittoresque - Un documentaire sur la Gaspésie	Maurice Proulx	
Quatre artistes canadiens	Quatre artistes canadiens	Albert Tessier	

== 1940s ==
English title	French title	Director	Ref
1941
Congrès eucharistique trifluvien	Congrès eucharistique trifluvien	Albert Tessier	
Écoles ménagères régionales	Écoles ménagères régionales	Albert Tessier	
1942
Artisanat Familial			
En pays neufs - Un épilogue à Ste-Anne-de-Roquemaure			
Une journée à l'exposition provinciale de Québec			
1943
At the Crossroads	À la croisée des chemins	Paul Guèvremont	
1945
Fridolinons	Fridolinons	Roger Blais	
The Music Master	Le Père Chopin	Fyodor Otsep	
1946
Le Percheron			
1947
Le Lin du Canada - La culture du lin			
Le Lin du Canada - L'utilisation du lin - Seconde partie			
Whispering City	La Forteresse	Fyodor Otsep	
1948
Femmes dépareillées	Femmes dépareillés	Albert Tessier	
Les République des As			
1949
Les Ennemis de la pomme de terre		Maurice Proulx	
The Grand Bill	Le Gros Bill	Jean-Yves Bigras, René Delacroix	
A Man and His Sin	Un homme et son péché	Paul Gury	
The Story of Dr. Louise	On ne triche pas avec la vie	René Delacroix, Paul Vandenberghe	
The Village Priest	Le Curé de village	Paul Gury	

== 1950s ==
English title	French title	Director	Ref
1950
Lights of My City	Les Lumières de ma ville	Jean-Yves Bigras	
Séraphin		Paul Gury	
1951
After Prison, What?	Après le bagne	Ron Weyman	
Cadet Holiday	Cadets en vacances	David Bairstow, Robert Humble, Douglas Wilkinson	
1952
The Bird Fancier	L'Homme aux oiseaux	Bernard Devlin, Jean Palardy	
Little Aurore's Tragedy	La petite Aurore: l'enfant martyre	Jean-Yves Bigras	
Neighbours	Voisins	Norman McLaren	
The Nightingale and the Bells	Le Rossignol et les cloches	René Delacroix	
1953
A Mother's Heart	Cœur de maman	René Delacroix	
Tit-Coq	Tit-Coq	Gratien Gélinas, René Delacroix	
1954
Écoles de bonheur	Écoles de bonheur	Albert Tessier	
The Spirit of Evil	L'Esprit du mal	Jean-Yves Bigras	
1955
Quartier chinois		Bernard Devlin	
1956
Le Village enchanté		Marcel Racicot, Réal Racicot	
1957
A Chairy Tale	Il était une chaise	Norman McLaren, Claude Jutra	
Le Survenant		Denys Gagnon, Maurice Leroux, Jo Martin, Paul Martin	
1958
The Snowshoers	Les Raquetteurs	Gilles Groulx, Michel Brault	
1959
Les Brûlés		Bernard Devlin	
L'immigré		Bernard Devlin	
Les Mains nettes		Claude Jutra	

== 1960s ==
English title	French title	Director	Ref
1962
Day After Day	Jour après jour	Clément Perron	
1963
All Things Considered	À tout prendre	Claude Jutra	
Alone or With Others	Seul ou avec d'autres	Denis Héroux, Denys Arcand, Stéphane Venne	
For Those Who Will Follow	Pour la suite du monde	Pierre Perrault	
1964
Caroline	Caroline	Georges Dufaux, Clément Perron	
The Cat in the Bag	Le Chat dans le sac	Gilles Groulx	
The Earth to Drink	La terre à boire	Jean-Paul Bernier	
Over My Head	Jusqu'au cou	Denis Héroux	
Trouble-Maker	Trouble fête	Pierre Patry	
Walls of Memory	Mémoire en fête	Léonard Forest	
1965
60 Cycles	60 Cycles	Jean Pierre Lefebvre	
Cain	Caïn, les marcheurs de la nuit	Pierre Patry	
The Merry World of Leopold Z	La vie heureuse de Léopold Z	Gilles Carle	
Mission of Fear	Astataïon, ou Le festin des morts	Fernand Dansereau	
The Revolutionary	Le Révolutionnaire	Jean Pierre Lefebvre	
Rope Around the Neck	La Corde au cou	Pierre Patry	
The Snow Has Melted on the Manicouagan	La neige a fondu sur la Manicouagan	Arthur Lamothe	
1966
Notes on a Triangle	Notes sur un triangle	René Jodoin	
Op Hop - Hop Op	Op Hop - Hop Op	Pierre Hébert	
Volleyball		Denys Arcand	
YUL 871		Jacques Godbout	
1967
Between Salt and Sweet Water	Entre la mer et l'eau douce	Michel Brault	
A Child in His Country	Un enfant...un pays	Pierre Moretti	
Don't Let It Kill You	Il ne faut pas mourir pour ça	Jean Pierre Lefebvre	
Le Grand Rock	Le Grand Rock	Raymond Garceau	
Manette : la folle et les dieux de carton	Manette : la folle et les dieux de carton	Camil Adam	
The Times That Are	Le règne du jour	Pierre Perrault	
With Drums and Trumpets	Avec tambours et trompettes	Marcel Carrière	
1968
Dust from Underground	Poussière sur la ville	Arthur Lamothe	
It Isn't Jacques Cartier's Fault	C'est pas la faute à Jacques Cartier	Clément Perron, Georges Dufaux	
Kid Sentiment	Kid Sentiment	Jacques Godbout	
Patricia and Jean-Baptiste	Patricia et Jean-Baptiste	Jean Pierre Lefebvre	
The Rape of a Sweet Young Girl	Le Viol d'une jeune fille douce	Gilles Carle	
The River Schooners	Les voitures d'eau	Pierre Perrault	
Straight to the Heart	Jusqu'au coeur	Jean Pierre Lefebvre	
1969
Deliver Us from Evil	Délivrez-nous du mal	Jean-Claude Lord	
Entre tu et vous		Gilles Groulx	
The House of Light	La chambre blanche	Jean Pierre Lefebvre	
My Friend Pierrette	Mon amie Pierrette	Jean Pierre Lefebvre	
St-Denis dans le temps		Marcel Carrière	
Valérie	Valérie	Denis Héroux	
Vertige	Vertige	Jean Beaudin	
Where Are You Then?	Où êtes-vous donc?	Gilles Groulx	
Wow	Wow	Claude Jutra	

== 1970s ==
English title	French title	Director	Ref
1970
Cotton Mill, Treadmill	On est au coton	Denys Arcand	
A Danger to Society	Danger pour la société	Jean Martimbeau	
Here and Now	L'Initiation	Denis Héroux	
Q-Bec My Love	Un succès commercial, ou Q-bec My Love	Jean Pierre Lefebvre	
Red	Red	Gilles Carle	
A Ridiculous Kind of Country	Un pays sans bon sens!	Pierre Perrault	
Two Women in Gold	Deux femmes en or	Claude Fournier	
1971
Acadia, Acadia	L'Acadie, L'Acadie?!?	Michel Brault, Pierre Perrault	
The Christmas Martian	Le martien de Noël	Bernard Gosselin	
The Great Ordinary Movie	Le Grand film ordinaire	Roger Frappier	
Heads or Tails	Pile ou face	Roger Fournier	
Hold on to Daddy's Ears	Tiens-toi bien après les oreilles à papa	Jean Bissonnette	
IXE-13	IXE-13	Jacques Godbout	
The Men	Les mâles	Gilles Carle	
Mon oncle Antoine	Mon oncle Antoine	Claude Jutra	
My Eye	Mon œil	Jean Pierre Lefebvre	
	La Nuit de la poésie 27 mars 1970	Jean-Claude Labrecque	
Stop	Stop	Jean Beaudin	
Those Damned Savages	Les maudits sauvages	Jean Pierre Lefebvre	
Water, Water Everywhere...	Heureux comme un poisson dans l'eau...	Gilles Blais	
We Are Far from the Sun	On est loin du soleil	Jacques Leduc	
1972
The Apparition	L'Apparition	Roger Cardinal	
Dirty Money	La Maudite Galette	Denys Arcand	
The Doves	Les Colombes	Jean-Claude Lord	
Dream Life	La Vie rêvée	Mireille Dansereau	
Françoise Durocher, Waitress	Françoise Durocher, waitress	André Brassard	
In the Name of the Son	Et du fils	Raymond Garceau	
Isis from the 8th Rang	Isis au 8	Alain Chartrand	
Montreal Blues	Montreal Blues	Pascal Gélinas	
Ordinary Tenderness	Tendresse ordinaire	Jacques Leduc	
Quebec: Duplessis and After...	Québec : Duplessis et après…	Denys Arcand	
The Rebels	Quelques arpents de neige	Denis Héroux	
Satan's Sabbath	Le diable est parmi nous	Jean Beaudin	
The Time of the Hunt	Le Temps d'une chasse	Francis Mankiewicz	
The True Nature of Bernadette	La Vraie Nature de Bernadette	Gilles Carle	
The Wise Guys	Les Smattes	Jean-Claude Labrecque	
1973
24 heures ou plus	24 heures ou plus	Gilles Groulx	
Action: The October Crisis of 1970		Robin Spry	
And I Love You Dearly	La Maîtresse	Anton Van de Water	
The Conquest	La Conquête	Jacques Gagné	
The Death of a Lumberjack	La Mort d'un bûcheron	Gilles Carle	
The Heavenly Bodies	Les Corps célestes	Gilles Carle	
Enuff Is Enuff	J'ai mon voyage!	Denis Héroux	
Kamouraska	Kamouraska	Claude Jutra	
The Last Betrothal	Les dernières fiançailles	Jean Pierre Lefebvre	
The Netsilik Eskimo Today	Esquimaux	Gilles Blais	
O.K. ... Laliberté	O.K. ... Laliberté	Marcel Carrière	
Oh, If Only My Monk Would Want	Ah! Si mon moine voulait...	Claude Pierson	
Pigs Are Seldom Clean	On n'engraisse pas les cochons à l'eau claire	Jean Pierre Lefebvre	
Reaction: A Portrait of a Society in Crisis		Robin Spry	
Réjeanne Padovani	Réjeanne Padovani	Denys Arcand	
There's Always a Way to Find a Way	Y'a toujours moyen de moyenner!	Denis Héroux	
Taureau	Taureau	Clément Perron	
Trois fois passera	Trois fois passera	Jean Beaudin	
Ultimatum	Ultimatum	Jean Pierre Lefebvre	
Unfinished Infonie	L'Infonie inachevée...	Roger Frappier	
Weapons and Men	Des armes et les hommes	André Melançon	
You Are Warm, You Are Warm	Tu brûles... tu brûles...	Jean-Guy Noël	
1974
The Apple, the Stem and the Seeds	La pomme, la queue et les pépins	Claude Fournier	
Bar Salon	Bar Salon	André Forcier	
Bingo	Bingo	Jean-Claude Lord	
Night Cap	Night Cap	André Forcier	
Once Upon a Time in the East	Il était une fois dans l'est	André Brassard	
Orders	Les Ordres	Michel Brault	
There's Nothing Wrong with Being Good to Yourself	Y'a pas d'mal à se faire du bien	Claude Mulot	
1975
Before the Time Comes	Le Temps de l'avant	Anne Claire Poirier	
Bound for Glory	Partis pour la gloire	Clément Perron	
Confidences of the Night	L'amour blessé	Jean Pierre Lefebvre	
Don't Push It	Pousse mais pousse égal	Denis Héroux	
For Better or For Worse	Pour le meilleur et pour le pire	Claude Jutra	
Gina	Gina	Denys Arcand	
Jacques Brel Is Alive and Well and Living in Paris		Denis Héroux	
The Mob	La Gammick	Jacques Godbout	
Normande	La Tête de Normande St-Onge	Gilles Carle	
The Port of Montreal	Le Port de Montréal	Gilles Blais	
Le Soleil a pas d'chance	Le Soleil a pas d'chance	Robert Favreau	
The Vultures	Les Vautours	Jean-Claude Labrecque	
A Woman Inflamed	Tout feu, tout femme	Gilles Richer	
1976
The Absence	L'Absence	Brigitte Sauriol	
Bernie and the Gang	Ti-mine, Bernie pis la gang...	Marcel Carrière	
Far from You Sweetheart	Je suis loin de toi mignonne	Claude Fournier	
The Flower Between the Teeth	La fleur aux dents	Thomas Vámos	
Let's Talk About Love	Parlez-nous d'amour	Jean-Claude Lord	
Little Tougas	Ti-Cul Tougas	Jean-Guy Noël	
	La lutte des travailleurs d’hôpitaux	Denys Arcand	
The Man from the Movies	Le gars des vues	Jean Pierre Lefebvre	
A Pacemaker and a Sidecar	L'Eau chaude, l'eau frette	André Forcier	
1977
The Angel and the Woman	L'Ange et la femme	Gilles Carle	
J.A. Martin Photographer	J.A. Martin photographe	Jean Beaudin	
The Late Blossom	Le Soleil se lève en retard	André Brassard	
The Old Country Where Rimbaud Died	Le Vieux pays où Rimbaud est mort	Jean Pierre Lefebvre	
Panic	Panique	Jean-Claude Lord	
1978
The Backstreet Six	Comme les six doigts de la main	André Melançon	
The Guardian Angel	L'Ange gardien	Jacques Fournier	
Soils of Canada	Les Sols du Canada	Gilles Blais	
1979
Blue Winter	L'Hiver bleu	André Blanchard	
Chocolate Eclair	Éclair au chocolat	Jean-Claude Lord	
A Scream from Silence	Mourir à tue-tête	Anne Claire Poirier	
To Be Sixteen	Avoir 16 ans	Jean Pierre Lefebvre	

== 1980s ==
English title	French title	Director	Ref
1980
The Coffin Affair	L'Affaire Coffin	Jean-Claude Labrecque	
Cordélia	Cordélia	Jean Beaudin	
Crac	Crac	Frédéric Back	
Good Riddance	Les Bons débarras	Francis Mankiewicz	
Hot Dogs	Les chiens chauds	Claude Fournier	
It Can't Be Winter, We Haven't Had Summer Yet	Ça peut pas être l'hiver, on n'a même pas eu d'été	Louise Carré	
La Nuit de la poésie 28 mars 1980	La Nuit de la poésie 28 mars 1980	Jean-Claude Labrecque	
Sophie Wollock's Newspaper		Gilles Blais	
Speak White	Speak White	Pierre Falardeau	
A Wives' Tale	Une histoire de femmes	Sophie Bissonnette, Martin Duckworth, Joyce Rock	
1981
Elvis Gratton	Elvis Gratton	Pierre Falardeau	
The Followers	Les Adeptes	Gilles Blais	
Happy Memories	Les Beaux Souvenirs	Francis Mankiewicz	
	Piwi	Jean-Claude Lauzon	
The Plouffe Family	Les Plouffe	Gilles Carle	
1982
Beyond Forty	La Quarantaine	Anne Claire Poirier	
Comfort and Indifference	Le confort et l'indifférence	Denys Arcand	
A Day in a Taxi	Une journée en taxi	Robert Ménard	
Larose, Pierrot and Luce	Larose, Pierrot et la Luce	Claude Gagnon	
Red Eyes	Les Yeux rouges	Yves Simoneau	
Scandale	Scandale	George Mihalka	
The Shimmering Beast	La bête lumineuse	Pierre Perrault	
Sweet Lies and Loving Oaths	Doux aveux	Fernand Dansereau	
Wild Flowers	Les fleurs sauvages	Jean Pierre Lefebvre	
1983
Au clair de la lune	Au clair de la lune	André Forcier	
The Ballad of Hard Times	La turlute des années dures	Richard Boutet, Pascal Gélinas	
Just a Game	Rien qu'un jeu	Brigitte Sauriol	
Lucien Brouillard	Lucien Brouillard	Bruno Carrière	
Maria Chapdelaine	Maria Chapdelaine	Gilles Carle	
The Tin Flute	Bonheur d'occasion	Claude Fournier	
To the Rhythm of My Heart	Au rythme de mon coeur	Jean Pierre Lefebvre	
1984
The Crime of Ovide Plouffe	Le Crime d'Ovide Plouffe	Denys Arcand	
The Dog Who Stopped the War	La Guerre des tuques	André Melançon	
Les Illusions tranquilles	Les Illusions tranquilles	Gilles Blais	
Mario	Mario	Jean Beaudin	
S As in...	Le jour S...	Jean Pierre Lefebvre	
A Woman in Transit	La Femme de l'hôtel	Léa Pool	
The Years of Dreams and Revolt	Les Années de rêves	Jean-Claude Labrecque	
1985
The Alley Cat	Le Matou	Jean Beaudin	
Caffè Italia, Montréal	Caffè Italia, Montréal	Paul Tana	
The Choice of a People	Le Choix d'un peuple	Hugues Mignault	
The Dame in Colour	La Dame en couleurs	Claude Jutra	
Pale Face	Visage pâle	Claude Gagnon	
The Peanut Butter Solution	Opération beurre de pinottes	Michael Rubbo	
Summer Rain	Pluie d'été	François Dauteuil	
Sylvia	Sylvia	Michel Murray	
1986
Bach and Broccoli	Bach et Bottine	André Melançon	
The Decline of the American Empire	Le Déclin de l'empire américain	Denys Arcand	
Dream Tracks	Les Traces du rêve	Jean-Daniel Lafond	
Equinox	Équinoxe	Arthur Lamothe	
Exit	Exit	Robert Ménard	
Intimate Power	Pouvoir intime	Yves Simoneau	
The Morning Man	Un matin, une vie	Danièle J. Suissa	
L'Orchestre fantastique	L'Orchestre fantastique	Gilles Blais	
Sonia	Sonia	Paule Baillargeon	
Transit	Transit	Richard Roy	
1987
Brother André	Le Frère André	Jean-Claude Labrecque	
In the Shadow of the Wind	Les Fous de Bassan	Yves Simoneau	
The Man Who Planted Trees	L'Homme qui plantait des arbres	Frédéric Back	
Night Zoo	Un Zoo la nuit	Jean-Claude Lauzon	
Train of Dreams		John N. Smith	
The Young Magician	Le jeune magicien	Waldemar Dziki	
1988
The Box of Sun	La boite à soleil	Jean Pierre Lefebvre	
Gaspard and Son	Gaspard et fil$	François Labonté	
The Heat Line	La ligne de chaleur	Hubert-Yves Rose	
Kalamazoo	Kalamazoo	André Forcier	
Malarek		Roger Cardinal	
The Mills of Power	Les Tisserands du pouvoir	Claude Fournier	
The Mills of Power 2	Les Tisserands du pouvoir II: La Révolte	Claude Fournier	
The Revolving Doors	Les Portes tournantes	Francis Mankiewicz	
You're Beautiful, Jeanne	T'es belle Jeanne	Robert Ménard	
1989
Cruising Bar	Cruising Bar	Robert Ménard	
How to Make Love to a Negro Without Getting Tired	Comment faire l'amour avec un nègre sans se fatiguer	Jacques W. Benoît	
In the Belly of the Dragon	Dans le ventre du dragon	Yves Simoneau	
Jesus of Montreal	Jésus de Montréal	Denys Arcand	
Justine's Film	Le film de Justine	Jeanne Crépeau	
Laura Laur	Laura Laur	Brigitte Sauriol	
Lessons on Life	Trois pommes à côté du sommeil	Jacques Leduc	
Looking for Eternity	Portion d'éternité	Robert Favreau	
The Paper Wedding	Les noces de papier	Michel Brault	
Salut Victor	Salut Victor	Anne Claire Poirier	
Unfaithful Mornings	Les Matins infidèles	François Bouvier, Jean Beaudry	

== 1990s ==
English title	French title	Director	Ref
1990
Another Man	Un autre homme	Charles Binamé	
Au chic resto pop	Au chic resto pop	Tahani Rached	
Cargo	Cargo	François Girard	
The Case of the Witch Who Wasn't	Pas de répit pour Mélanie	Jean Beaudry	
The Company of Strangers	Le Fabuleux gang des sept	Cynthia Scott	
Ding et Dong	Ding et Dong, le film	Alain Chartrand	
The Horse Trader's Daughter	La Fille du Maquignon	Ahmed Mazouz	
An Imaginary Tale	Une histoire inventée	André Forcier	
Moody Beach	Moody Beach	Richard Roy	
The Moving Statue	La Liberté d'un statue	Olivier Asselin	
The Night of the Visitor	La nuit du visiteur	Laurent Gagliardi	
The Party	Le Party	Pierre Falardeau	
1991
Alisée	Alisée	Denise Filiatrault	
The Fabulous Voyage of the Angel	La Fabuleux voyage de l'ange	Jean Pierre Lefebvre	
Four Stiffs and a Trombone	L'assassin jouait du trombone	Roger Cantin	
Joseph K.: The Numbered Man	Joseph K, l'homme numéroté	Gilles Blais	
Léolo	Léolo	Jean-Claude Lauzon	
Love Crazy	Amoureux fou	Robert Ménard	
Love Me	Love-moi	Marcel Simard	
Montreal Stories	Montréal vu par...	Denys Arcand, Michel Brault, Atom Egoyan, Jacques Leduc, Léa Pool, Patricia Rozema	
Nelligan	Nelligan	Robert Favreau	
The Savage Woman	La Demoiselle sauvage	Léa Pool	
1992
Being at Home with Claude	Being at Home with Claude	Jean Beaudin	
The Black Sheep	Le Mouton noir	Jacques Godbout	
The Measure of Your Passage	Le singe bleu	Esther Valiquette	
Phantom Life	La Vie fantôme	Jacques Leduc	
Requiem for a Handsome Bastard	Requiem pour un beau sans-coeur	Robert Morin	
The Saracen Woman	La Sarrasine	Paul Tana	
The Steak	Le Steak	Pierre Falardeau, Manon Leriche	
1993
Cap Tourmente	Cap Tourmente	Michel Langlois	
The Engagement	Les Fiancés de la tour Eiffel	Gilles Blais	
La Florida	La Florida	George Mihalka	
Matusalem	Matusalem	Roger Cantin	
The Mighty River	Le Fleuve aux grandes eaux	Frédéric Back	
Le Temps des bouffons	Le Temps des bouffons	Pierre Falardeau	
Thirty Two Short Films About Glenn Gould		François Girard	
Two Can Play	Deux actrices	Micheline Lanctôt	
Women in Love	Les Amoureuses	Johanne Prégent	
1994
L'Affaire Norman William	L'Affaire Norman William	Jacques Godbout	
Chili's Blues	C'était le 12 du 12 et Chili avait les blues	Charles Binamé	
Desire in Motion	Mouvements du désir	Léa Pool	
Freedom Outraged	La Liberté en colère	Jean-Daniel Lafond	
A Hero's Life	La vie d'un héros	Micheline Lanctôt	
Louis 19, King of the Airwaves	Louis 19, le roi des ondes	Michel Poulette	
My Friend Max	Mon amie Max	Michel Brault	
Octobre	Octobre	Pierre Falardeau	
Rural Route 5	Rang 5	Richard Lavoie	
Windigo	Windigo	Robert Morin	
The Wind from Wyoming	Le Vent du Wyoming	André Forcier	
Yes Sir! Madame...	Yes Sir! Madame...	Robert Morin	
1995
Black List	Liste noire	Jean-Marc Vallée	
The Confessional	Le Confessionnal	Robert Lepage	
Eldorado	Eldorado	Charles Binamé	
The Lion and the Lamb	Le Lion et l'Agneau	Luc Beauchamp	
Magical Flowers	Les Fleurs magiques	Jean-Marc Vallée	
The Sphinx	Le Sphinx	Louis Saia	
Water Child	L'Enfant d'eau	Robert Ménard	
Zigrail	Zigrail	André Turpin	
1996
Angelo, Fredo and Romeo	Angelo, Fredo et Roméo	Pierre Plante	
Cosmos	Cosmos	Jennifer Alleyn, Manon Briand, Marie-Julie Dallaire, Arto Paragamian, André Turpin, Denis Villeneuve	
A Cry in the Night	Le Cri de la nuit	Jean Beaudry	
The Fate of America	Le Sort de l'Amérique	Jacques Godbout	
The Human Plant	La Plante humaine	Pierre Hébert	
The Ideal Man	L'homme idéal	George Mihalka	
Karmina	Karmina	Gabriel Pelletier	
Love Me, Love Me Not	J'aime j'aime pas	Sylvie Groulx	
Mistaken Identity	Erreur sur la personne	Gilles Noël	
My Life Is a River	Une vie comme rivière	Alain Chartrand	
Night of the Flood	La nuit du déluge	Bernar Hébert	
Not Me!	Sous-sol	Pierre Gang	
Polygraph	Le Polygraphe	Robert Lepage	
Poor Man's Pudding	Pudding chômeur	Gilles Carle	
Poverty and Other Delights	Joyeux Calvaire	Denys Arcand	
1997
Les Boys	Les Boys	Louis Saia	
The Caretaker's Lodge	La conciergerie	Michel Poulette	
The Countess of Baton Rouge	La Comtesse de Bâton Rouge	André Forcier	
Le Grand silence	Le Grand silence	Gilles Blais	
Heads or Tails	J'en suis!	Claude Fournier	
Pâté chinois	Pâté chinois	Philippe Falardeau	
The Revenge of the Woman in Black	La Vengeance de la femme en noir	Roger Cantin	
The Seat of the Soul	Le siège de l'âme	Olivier Asselin	
Stowaways	Clandestins	Denis Chouinard	
Tu as crié Let Me Go	Tu as crié Let Me Go	Anne Claire Poirier	
Zie 37 Stagen	Zie 37 Stagen	Sylvain Guy	
1998
Les Boys II	Les Boys II	Louis Saia	
Forest Alert	L'erreur boréale	Richard Desjardins, Robert Monderie	
It's Your Turn, Laura Cadieux	C't'à ton tour, Laura Cadieux	Denise Filiatrault	
Julie and Me	Revoir Julie	Jeanne Crépeau	
Magical Words	Les Mots magiques	Jean-Marc Vallée	
Mr. Aiello	La Déroute	Paul Tana	
Nô	Nô	Robert Lepage	
Now or Never	Aujourd'hui ou jamais	Jean Pierre Lefebvre	
The Old Man and the Sea	Le Vieil Homme et la mer	Alexandre Petrov	
The Red Violin	Le Violon rouge	François Girard	
Streetheart	Le Cœur au poing	Charles Binamé	
When I Will Be Gone	L'Âge de braise	Jacques Leduc	
Whoever Dies, Dies in Pain	Quiconque meurt, meurt à douleur	Robert Morin	
1999
Alegría	Alegría	Benoît Jutras	
Atomic Saké	Atomic Saké	Louise Archambault	
August 32nd on Earth	Un 32 août sur terre	Denis Villeneuve	
The Big Snake of the World	Le Grand Serpent du monde	Yves Dion	
Cuckoo, Mr. Edgar!	Coucou Monsieur Edgar!	Pierre M. Trudeau	
Elvis Gratton II : Miracle in Memphis	Elvis Gratton II : Miracle à Memphis	Pierre Falardeau	
Full Blast	Full Blast	Rodrigue Jean	
The Hat	Le Chapeau	Michèle Cournoyer	
Last Call for Cuba	L'Heure de Cuba	Jean-Daniel Lafond	
Images of a Dictatorship	Images d'une dictature	Patricio Henríquez	
The Last Breath	Le Dernier souffle	Richard Ciupka	
Laura Cadieux II	Laura Cadieux... la suite	Denise Filiatrault	
The Long Winter	Quand je serai parti... vous vivrez encore	Michel Brault	
Matroni and Me	Matroni et moi	Jean-Philippe Duval	
Memories Unlocked	Souvenirs intimes	Jean Beaudin	
Pin-Pon: The Film	Pin-Pon, le film	Ghyslaine Côté	
Post Mortem	Post-Mortem	Louis Bélanger	
Sable Island	L'Île de Sable	Johanne Prégent	
Set Me Free	Emporte-moi	Léa Pool	
Winter Stories	Histoires d'hiver	François Bouvier	

== 2000s ==
English title	French title	Director	Ref
2000
Anne Hébert	Anne Hébert	Jacques Godbout	
Between the Moon and Montevideo	Entre la Lune et Montevideo	Attila Bertalan	
The Bottle	La bouteille	Alain DesRochers	
From the Big Bang to Tuesday Morning	Du big bang à mardi matin	Claude Cloutier	
Guantanamera Boxe	Guantanamera Boxe	Richard Jean-Baptiste, Yann Langevin	
Heaven	Le petit ciel	Jean-Sébastien Lord	
Hochelaga	Hochelaga	Michel Jetté	
If Only I		Donigan Cumming	
Inséparables	Inséparables	Normand Bergeron	
The Left-Hand Side of the Fridge	La Moitié gauche du frigo	Philippe Falardeau	
Life After Love	La Vie après l'amour	Gabriel Pelletier	
Maelström	Maelström	Denis Villeneuve	
Man of Grease		Ezra Soiferman	
The Orphan Muses	Les Muses orphelines	Robert Favreau	
Pandora's Beauty	La Beauté de Pandore	Charles Binamé	
Possible Worlds		Robert Lepage	
Romain et Juliette	Romain et Juliette	Frédéric Lapierre	
Saint Jude		John L'Ecuyer	
Searching for Louis Archambault	À la recherche de Louis Archambault	Werner Volkmer	
Stardom	Stardom	Denys Arcand	
The Three Madeleines	Les fantômes des trois Madeleines	Guylaine Dionne	
Traitor or Patriot	Traître ou patriote	Jacques Godbout	
2001
4125 Parthenais	Le 4125, rue Parthenais	Isabelle Lavigne	
Black Soul	Âme noire	Martine Chartrand	
Blue Potatoes	Le Minot d'or	Isabelle Raynauld	
Les Boys III	Les Boys III	Louis Saia	
Danny in the Sky		Denis Langlois	
February 15, 1839	15 février 1839	Pierre Falardeau	
The Fiancée of Life	La fiancée de la vie	Carole Laganière	
Games of the Heart	Du pic au cœur	Céline Baril	
A Girl at the Window	Une jeune fille à la fenêtre	Francis Leclerc	
The Hidden Fortress	La Forteresse suspendue	Roger Cantin	
Ice Cream, Chocolate and Other Consolations	Crème glacée, chocolat et autres consolations	Julie Hivon	
Karmen Geï	Karmen Geï	Joseph Gaï Ramaka	
Karmina 2	Karmina 2	Gabriel Pelletier	
Marriages	Mariages	Catherine Martin	
My Dinner with Weegee		Donigan Cumming	
My Eye for a Camera	Mon oeil pour une caméra	Denys Desjardins	
Nim and Son		Louis Taft	
On Your Head	Le ciel sur la tête	Geneviève Lefebvre and André Melançon	
Operation Cobra	Opération Cobra	Robert Morin	
The Pig's Law	La Loi du cochon	Érik Canuel	
Side Orders	Foie de canard et cœur de femme	Stéphane Lapointe	
Soft Shell Man	Un crabe dans la tête	André Turpin	
Remembrance		Stephanie Morgenstern	
Tar Angel	L'Ange de goudron	Denis Chouinard	
Three Princesses for Roland	Trois princesses pour Roland	André-Line Beauparlant	
Wedding Night	Nuit de noces	Émile Gaudreault	
The Woman Who Drinks	La Femme qui boit	Bernard Émond	
2002
Alice's Odyssey	L'Odyssée d'Alice Tremblay	Denise Filiatrault	
Aspiration	Aspiration	Constant Mentzas	
The Brainwashers	Les Ramoneurs cérébraux	Patrick Bouchard	
Chaos and Desire	La Turbulence des fluides	Manon Briand	
Clearing Skies	Une éclaircie sur le fleuve	Rosa Zacharie	
The Collector	Le Collectionneur	Jean Beaudin	
Dangerous People	Les Dangereux	Louis Saia	
A Falconer's Chronicle	Rien sans pennes	Marc Girard	
Hit and Run	Hit and Run	Richard Jutras	
In Store	En magasin	Mario Bonenfant	
Je me souviens	Je me souviens	Eric R. Scott	
Looking for Leonard		Matt Bissonnette and Steven Clark	
The Marsh	Le Marais	Kim Nguyen	
Mary's Sons	Les Fils de Marie	Carole Laure	
Les Moutons de Jacob	Les Moutons de Jacob	Jean-François Pothier	
The Mysterious Miss C.	La Mystérieuse mademoiselle C.	Richard Ciupka	
The Negro	Le Nèg	Robert Morin	
North Station	Station Nord	Jean-Claude Lord	
Québec-Montréal	Québec-Montréal	Ricardo Trogi	
The Ring Within	Le Ring intérieur	Dan Bigras	
Savage Messiah		Mario Azzopardi	
Séraphin: Heart of Stone	Séraphin : Un homme et son péché	Charles Binamé	
War Babies	War Babies, nés de la haine	Raymonde Provencher	
2003
8:17 p.m. Darling Street	20h17 rue Darling	Bernard Émond	
À Hauteur d'homme	À Hauteur d'homme	Jean-Claude Labrecque	
The Barbarian Invasions	Les Invasions barbares	Denys Arcand	
Black Ink on Blue Sky	Encre noir sur fond d'azur	Félix Dufour-Laperrière	
Blue Like a Gunshot	Bleu comme un coup de feu	Masoud Raouf	
Evil Words	Sur le seuil	Éric Tessier	
Far Side of the Moon	La face cachée de la lune	Robert Lepage	
Gaz Bar Blues	Gaz Bar Blues	Louis Bélanger	
Les Immortels	Les Immortels	Paul Thinel	
Islet	Îlot	Nicolas Brault	
Juniper Tree	Le Piège d'Issoudun	Micheline Lanctôt	
Ma voisine danse le ska	Ma voisine danse le ska	Nathalie Saint-Pierre	
Mambo Italiano	Mambo Italiano	Émile Gaudreault	
Mammouth	Mammouth	Stefan Miljevic	
The Moon and the Violin	Un toit, un violon, la lune	Carole Laganière	
Moving	Premier juillet	Philippe Gagnon	
Red Nose	Nez rouge	Érik Canuel	
Roger Toupin, épicier variété	Roger Toupin, épicier variété	Benoît Pilon	
Seducing Doctor Lewis	La Grande Séduction	Jean-François Pouliot	
Stormy Night	Nuit d'orage	Michèle Lemieux	
Yellowknife	Yellowknife	Rodrigue Jean	
2004
Acapulco Gold	Acapulco Gold	André Forcier	
Battle of the Brave	Nouvelle-France	Jean Beaudin	
Bittersweet Memories	Ma vie en cinémascope	Denise Filiatrault	
The Blue Butterfly	Le Papillon bleu	Léa Pool	
The Bridge	Le Pont	Guy Édoin	
The Cop, the Criminal and the Clown	C'est pas moi, c'est l'autre	Alain Zaloum	
CQ2 (Seek You Too)	CQ2 (Seek You Too)	Carole Laure	
Dans une galaxie près de chez vous	Dans une galaxie près de chez vous	Claude Desrosiers	
East End Kids	Vues de l'est	Carole Laganière	
Elvis Gratton 3: La Vengeance d'Elvis Wong	Elvis Gratton 3: La Vengeance d'Elvis Wong	Pierre Falardeau	
Eternal	Eternal	Wilhelm Liebenberg	
The Five of Us	Elles étaient cinq	Ghyslaine Côté	
Happiness Is a Sad Song	Le Bonheur c'est une chanson triste	François Delisle	
Happy Camper	Camping sauvage	Guy A. Lepage	
How to Conquer America in One Night	Comment conquérir l'Amérique en une nuit	Dany Laferrière	
The Incomparable Miss C.	L'Incomparable Mademoiselle C	Richard Ciupka	
Jack Paradise: Montreal by Night	Jack Paradise: Les nuits de Montréal	Gilles Noël	
The Last Tunnel	Le Dernier Tunnel	Érik Canuel	
Looking for Alexander	Mémoires affectives	Francis Leclerc	
Love and Magnets	Les Aimants	Yves Pelletier	
Machine Gun Molly	Monica la mitraille	Pierre Houle	
Mammouth	Mammouth	Stefan Miljevic	
Mr. Mergler's Gift		Beverly Shaffer	
My Only Love	Je n'aime que toi	Claude Fournier	
Nibbles		Christopher Hinton	
On the Verge of a Fever	Le Goût des jeunes filles	John L'Ecuyer	
Papa	Papa	Émile Proulx-Cloutier	
La Planque	La Planque	Alexandre Chartrand, Thierry Gendron	
So the Moon Rises	La lune viendra d'elle-même	Marie-Jan Seille	
Tideline	Littoral	Wajdi Mouawad	
TV Dinner...Burp!		Vanessa-Tatjana Beerli	
Two Eastern Hair Lines		Steven Woloshen	
What Remains of Us	Ce qu'il reste de nous	François Prévost, Hugo Latulippe	
White Skin	La Peau blanche	Daniel Roby	
2005
Au Nom de la mère et du fils	Au Nom de la mère et du fils	Maryse Legagneur	
Audition	L'Audition	Luc Picard	
Aurore	Aurore	Luc Dionne	
Les Boys IV	Les Boys IV	George Mihalka	
La Classe de Madame Lise	La Classe de Madame Lise	Sylvie Groulx	
Conventum	Conventum	Gilles Blais	
C.R.A.Z.Y.	C.R.A.Z.Y.	Jean-Marc Vallée	
Dehors novembre	Dehors novembre	Patrick Bouchard	
Dodging the Clock	Horloge biologique	Ricardo Trogi	
Drifting States	Les États nordiques	Denis Côté	
Familia	Familia	Louise Archambault	
Gilles Carle: The Untamable Mind	Gilles Carle ou l'indomptable imaginaire	Charles Binamé	
Instant Idol	Idole instantanée	Yves Desgagnés	
Kamataki	Kamataki	Claude Gagnon	
The Last Incarnation	La Dernière Incarnation	Demian Fuica	
Life with My Father	La Vie avec mon père	Sébastien Rose	
Living on the Edge	L'Extrème frontière	Rodrigue Jean	
Maman Last Call	Maman Last Call	François Bouvier	
The Novena	La Neuvaine	Bernard Émond	
Opération retour	Opération retour	Luc Côté	
The Outlander	Le Survenant	Érik Canuel	
Perreault Dancer	Danser Perreault	Tim Southam	
Pinocchio 3000		Daniel Robichaud	
The Rocket	Maurice Richard	Charles Binamé	
Saint Martyrs of the Damned	Saint-Martyrs-des-Damnés	Robin Aubert	
Thieves of Innocence	Les Voleurs d'enfance	Paul Arcand	
Tuesday Morning...Somewhere	Mardi matin...quelque part	Hélène Bélanger Martin	
The United States of Albert	Les États-Unis d'Albert	André Forcier	
The White Chapel	Une chapelle blanche)	Simon Lavoie	
Who Shot My Brother?	Qui a tiré sur mon frère?	German Gutierrez, Carmen Garcia	
Yule Croak	Petit Pow ! Pow ! Noël	Robert Morin	
2006
Angel's Rage	La Rage de l'ange	Dan Bigras	
Asiemut	Asiemut	Mélanie Carrier, Olivier Higgins	
The Beautiful Beast	La Belle bête	Karim Hussain	
Black Eyed Dog	Simplement Betty	Pierre Gang	
Bon Cop, Bad Cop	Bon Cop, Bad Cop	Érik Canuel	
Cadavre Exquis, première édition	Cadavre Exquis première édition	Multiple directors	
Cheech	Cheech	Patrice Sauvé	
Congorama	Congorama	Philippe Falardeau	
The Dark Side of the White Lady	Le côté obscur de la Dame Blanche	Patricio Henríquez	
The Days	Les Jours	Maxime Giroux	
The Dead Water	Les Eaux mortes	Guy Édoin	
Deliver Me	Délivrez-moi	Denis Chouinard	
Driven by Dreams	À force de rêves	Serge Giguère	
Duo	Duo	Richard Ciupka	
Family History	Histoire de famille	Michel Poulette	
A Family Secret	Le Secret de ma mère	Ghyslaine Côté	
From My Window, Without a Home…	De ma fenêtre, sans maison...	Maryanne Zéhil	
The Genius of Crime	Le Génie du crime	Louis Bélanger	
Jack and Jacques	Jack et Jacques	Marie-Hélène Copti	
The Little Book of Revenge	Guide de la petite vengeance	Jean-François Pouliot	
	L'Illusion Tranquille	Joanne Marcotte	
May God Bless America	Que Dieu bénisse l'Amérique	Robert Morin	
Missing Victor Pellerin	Rechercher Victor Pellerin	Sophie Deraspe	
	Le Paradis d'Arthur	Luc Beauchamp	
Romeo and Juliet	Roméo et Juliette	Yves Desgagnés	
The Secret Life of Happy People	La vie secrète des gens heureux	Stéphane Lapointe	
Steel Toes		David Gow and Mark Adam	
A Sunday in Kigali	Un dimanche à Kigali	Robert Favreau	
Without Her	Sans elle	Jean Beaudin	
2007
The 3 L'il Pigs	Les 3 p'tits cochons	Patrick Huard	
Antlers	Panache	André-Line Beauparlant	
La belle empoisonneuse	La belle empoisonneuse	Richard Jutras	
Bluff	Bluff	Simon-Olivier Fecteau, Marc-André Lavoie	
La Capture	La Capture	Carole Laure	
Code 13	Code 13	Mathieu Denis	
Continental, a Film Without Guns	Continental, un film sans fusil	Stéphane Lafleur	
Days of Darkness	L'Âge des ténèbres	Denys Arcand	
The Descendant		Philippe Spurrell	
Dust Bowl Ha! Ha!	Dust Bowl Ha! Ha!	Sébastien Pilote	
The Invisible Nation	Le Peuple invisible	Richard Desjardins, Robert Monderie	
Mémoire à la dérive	Mémoire à la dérive	Pauline Voisard	
Mona's Daughters	Le Cèdre penché	Rafaël Ouellet	
My Aunt Aline	Ma tante Aline	Gabriel Pelletier	
My Daughter, My Angel	Ma fille, mon ange	Alexis Durand-Brault	
Nitro	Nitro	Alain DesRochers	
The Other Side of the Country	De l'autre côté du pays	Catherine Hébert	
Our Jail Is a Kingdom	Notre prison est un royaume	Simon Galiero	
Our Private Lives	Nos Vies privées	Denis Côté	
The Ring	Le Ring	Anaïs Barbeau-Lavalette	
The Schoolyard	Les Grands	Chloé Leriche	
Sleeping Betty	Isabelle au bois dormant	Claude Cloutier	
Summit Circle	Contre tout espérance	Bernard Émond	
Sur la terre comme au ciel	Sur la terre comme au ciel	Hervé Demers	
Taking the Plunge	À vos marques... party!	Frédéric D'Amours	
Twilight	La Brunante	Fernand Dansereau	
Le Voyage d'une vie	Le Voyage d'une vie	Maryse Chartrand	
You	Toi	François Delisle	
2008
After the Ballot	Chers électeurs	Manuel Foglia	
All That She Wants	Elle veut le chaos	Denis Côté	
The American Trap	Le piège américain	Charles Binamé	
Babine	Babine	Luc Picard	
Le Banquet	Le Banquet	Sébastien Rose	
Before Tomorrow	Le Jour avant le lendemain	Madeline Ivalu, Marie-Hélène Cousineau	
Behind Me	Derrière moi	Rafaël Ouellet	
Beyond the Walls	La Battue	Guy Édoin	
Borderline	Borderline	Lyne Charlebois	
The Broken Line	La ligne brisée	Louis Choquette	
	Le cas Roberge - le film	Raphaël Malo	
Cruising Bar 2	Cruising Bar 2	Robert Ménard and Michel Côté	
Daddy Goes Ptarmigan Hunting	Papa à la chasse aux lagopèdes	Robert Morin	
	Dans une galaxie près de chez vous 2	Philippe Gagnon	
The Deserter	Le Déserteur	Simon Lavoie	
	En plein coeur	Stéphane Gehami	
Everything Is Fine	Tout est parfait	Yves-Christian Fournier	
Forever Quebec	Infiniment Québec	Jean-Claude Labrecque	
Gilles	Gilles	Constant Mentzas	
Honey, I'm in Love	Le grand départ	Claude Meunier	
It's Not Me, I Swear!	C'est pas moi, je le jure!	Philippe Falardeau	
Lost Song	Lost Song	Rodrigue Jean	
Mommy Is at the Hairdresser's	Maman est chez le coiffeur	Léa Pool	
The Memories of Angels	La Mémoire des anges	Luc Bourdon	
My Name Is Victor Gazon	Mon nom est Victor Gazon	Patrick Gazé	
The Necessities of Life	Ce qu'il faut pour vivre	Benoît Pilon	
A No-Hit No-Run Summer	Un été sans point ni coup sûr	Francis Leclerc	
Passages	Passages	Marie-Josée Saint-Pierre	
A Sentimental Capitalism	Un capitalisme sentimental	Olivier Asselin	
Tomorrow	Demain	Maxime Giroux	
Truffles	Truffe	Kim Nguyen	
Under the Hood: A Voyage Into the World of Torture	Sous la cagoule, un voyage au bout de la torture	Patricio Henríquez	
West of Pluto	À l'ouest de Pluton	Myriam Verreault, Henry Bernadet	
Who Is KK Downey?		Darren Curtis, Pat Kiely	
2009
À trois Marie s'en va	À trois Marie s'en va	Anne-Marie Ngô	
1981	1981	Ricardo Trogi	
3 Seasons	3 saisons	Jim Donovan	
5150 Elm's Way	5150, rue des Ormes	Éric Tessier	
Assassin's Creed: Lineage		Yves Simoneau	
Blind Spot	Lucidité passagère	Fabrice Barrilliet, Nicolas Bolduc, Julien Knafo, Marie-Hélène Panisset	
Cadavres		Érik Canuel	
The Canadiens, Forever	Pour toujours, les Canadiens!	Sylvain Archambault	
Carcasses	Carcasses	Denis Côté	
A Cargo to Africa	Un cargo pour l'Afrique	Roger Cantin	
	Classes de Maîtres	Luc Bourdon	
Clouds Over the City	Nuages sur la ville	Simon Galiero	
Detour	Détour	Sylvain Guy	
Father and Guns	De père en flic	Émile Gaudreault	
Free Fall	Les pieds dans le vide	Mariloup Wolfe	
A Happy Man	Le Bonheur de Pierre	Robert Ménard	
Heat Wave	Les Grandes Chaleurs	Sophie Lorain	
I Killed My Mother	J'ai tué ma mère	Xavier Dolan	
Impasse	Impasse	Joël Gauthier	
Je me souviens		André Forcier	
Land of Men	Terre des hommes	Ky Nam Le Duc	
The Legacy	La Donation	Bernard Émond	
Life Begins	La Vie commence	Émile Proulx-Cloutier	
The Master Key	Grande Ourse : la clé des possibles)	Patrice Sauvé	
Men for Sale	Hommes à louer	Rodrigue Jean	
Mr. Nobody		Jaco Van Dormael	
New Denmark	New Denmark	Rafaël Ouellet	
Noemie: The Secret	Noémie: Le secret	Frédéric d'Amours	
Polytechnique	Polytechnique	Denis Villeneuve	
Refrain		Tyler Gibb	
Snow Hides the Shade of Fig Trees	La neige cache l'ombre des figuiers	Samer Najari	
Sticky Fingers	Les Doigts croches	Ken Scott	
Suzie	Suzie	Micheline Lanctôt	
Taking the Plunge 2	À vos marques... party! 2	Frédéric D'Amours	
Through the Mist	Dédé, à travers les brumes)	Jean-Philippe Duval	
The Timekeeper	L'Heure de vérité	Louis Bélanger	
Train to Nowhere	À quelle heure le train pour nulle part	Robin Aubert	
Transit		Christian de la Cortina	
Vital Signs	Les signes vitaux	Sophie Deraspe	
Waitresses Wanted	Serveuses demandées	Guylaine Dionne	

== 2010s ==
English title	French title	Director	Ref
2010
10½		Podz	
2 Frogs in the West	2 frogs dans l'Ouest	Dany Papineau	
7 Days	Les 7 jours du Talion	Podz	
Aurelie Laflamme's Diary	Le Journal d'Aurélie Laflamme	Christian Laurence	
The Bait	L'Appât	Yves Simoneau	
The Child Prodigy	L'Enfant Prodige	Luc Dionne	
City of Shadows	La Cité	Kim Nguyen	
The Comeback	Cabotins	Alain DesRochers	
Crying Out	À l'origine d'un cri	Robin Aubert	
Curling	Curling	Denis Côté	
Diary of an Aid Worker	Journal d'un coopérant	Robert Morin	
Die		Dominic James	
Everywhere		Alexis Durand-Brault	
Exit 67	Sortie 67	Jephté Bastien	
Face Time	Le Baiser du barbu	Yves P. Pelletier	
Falardeau	Falardeau	Carmen Garcia, German Gutierrez	
File 13	Filière 13	Patrick Huard	
Frozen Words	Les Mots gelés	Isabelle d'Amours	
The Hair of the Beast	Le Poil de la bête	Philippe Gagnon	
The Heart that Beats	Ce cœur qui bat	Philippe Lesage	
Heartbeats	Les Amours imaginaires	Xavier Dolan	
The High Cost of Living		Deborah Chow	
Incendies	Incendies	Denis Villeneuve	
Jo for Jonathan	Jo pour Jonathan	Maxime Giroux	
Journey's End	La Belle Visite	Jean-François Caissy	
Lance et compte	Lance et compte	Frédérik D'Amours	
The Last Escape	La Dernière Fugue	Léa Pool	
A Life Begins	Une vie qui commence	Michel Monty	
Mourning for Anna	Trois temps après la mort d'Anna	Catherine Martin	
On the Way to the Sea	En allant vers la mer	Tao Gu	
Piché: The Landing of a Man	Piché: entre ciel et terre	Sylvain Archambault	
Powder	Poudre	Ky Nam Le Duc	
Route 132	Route 132	Louis Bélanger	
The Seducer: An Endangered Species?	Le Séducteur: un animal en voie de disparition?	Olivier Adam	
Silence Lies	Tromper le silence	Julie Hivon	
Stay with Me	Reste avec moi	Robert Ménard	
Suspicions	Jaloux	Patrick Demers	
Tough Luck	Y'en aura pas de facile	Marc-André Lavoie	
The Trenches	La Tranchée	Claude Cloutier	
The Trotsky		Jacob Tierney	
Turtles Do Not Die of Old Age	Les tortues ne meurent pas de vieillesse	Hind Benchekroun, Sami Mermer	
Twice a Woman	2 fois une femme	François Delisle	
The Wild Hunt		Alexandre Franchi	
2011
All That You Possess	Tout ce que tu possèdes	Bernard Émond	
At Night, They Dance		Isabelle Lavigne, Stéphane Thibault	
Blind Spot	Angle mort	Dominic James	
BumRush		Michel Jetté	
Café de Flore	Café de Flore	Jean-Marc Vallée	
Le Colis		Gaëlle d'Ynglemare	
Coteau rouge		André Forcier	
East End Forever	L'Est pour toujours	Carole Laganière	
Encounters	Rencontre	Mélanie Carrier, Olivier Higgins	
Familiar Grounds	En terrains connus	Stéphane Lafleur	
Fear of Water	La Peur de l'eau	Gabriel Pelletier	
For the Love of God	Pour l'amour de Dieu	Micheline Lanctôt	
French Immersion	French Immersion	Kevin Tierney	
French Kiss		Sylvain Archambault	
Funkytown		Daniel Roby	
Gerry		Alain DesRochers	
Good Neighbours		Jacob Tierney	
The Happiness of Others	Le Bonheur des autres	Jean-Philippe Pearson	
Henry		Yan England	
The Hole Story	Trou story	Richard Desjardins, Robert Monderie	
Inner City	La Cité entre les murs	Alain Fournier	
The Kate Logan Affair		Noël Mitrani	
Laurentia	Laurentie	Mathieu Denis, Simon Lavoie	
Mesnak		Yves Sioui Durand	
Monsieur Lazhar	Monsieur Lazhar	Philippe Falardeau	
A Montreal Girl	La fille de Montréal	Jeanne Crépeau	
Notes on a Road Less Taken	Carnets d'un grand détour	Catherine Hébert	
Nuit #1	Nuit #1	Anne Émond	
On the Beat	Sur le rythme	Charles-Olivier Michaud	
Romeo Eleven	Roméo Onze	Ivan Grbovic	
La Ronde		Sophie Goyette	
La Run		Demian Fuica	
The Salesman	Le Vendeur	Sébastien Pilote	
A Sense of Humour	Le Sens de l'humour	Émile Gaudreault	
Shadowboxing		Jesse Noah Klein	
Snow and Ashes	Neige et cendres	Charles-Olivier Michaud	
Starbuck	Starbuck	Ken Scott	
Sunday	Dimanche	Patrick Doyon	
Thrill of the Hills	Frisson des collines	Richard Roy	
Trash	Décharge	Benoît Pilon	
Trotteur	Trotteur	Arnaud Brisebois, Francis Leclerc	
la vérité		Marc Bisaillon	
Wetlands	Marécages	Guy Édoin	
The Year Dolly Parton Was My Mom		Tara Johns	
	Le Pays des âmes	Olivier Godin	
2012
L'Affaire Dumont		Daniel Grou	
Alphée of the Stars	Alphée des étoiles	Hugo Latulippe	
Before My Heart Falls	Avant que mon cœur bascule	Sébastien Rose	
The Bossé Empire	L'Empire Bossé	Claude Desrosiers	
Camion	Camion	Rafaël Ouellet	
Catimini	Catimini	Nathalie Saint-Pierre	
Ésimésac	Ésimésac	Luc Picard	
Exile	Exil	Charles-Olivier Michaud	
Fair Sex	Les Manèges humains	Martin Laroche	
Ina Litovski		Anaïs Barbeau-Lavalette, André Turpin	
Inch'Allah		Anaïs Barbeau-Lavalette	
Une jeune fille		Catherine Martin	
Karakara		Claude Gagnon	
Kaspar	Kaspar	Diane Obomsawin	
Laurence Anyways		Xavier Dolan	
Liverpool		Manon Briand	
La Maison du Pêcheur		Alain Chartrand	
Mars and April	Mars et Avril	Martin Villeneuve	
Mort subite d'un homme-théâtre	Mort subite d'un homme-théâtre	Jean-Claude Coulbois	
My Real Life	Ma vie réelle	Magnus Isacsson	
The Near Future	Le futur proche	Sophie Goyette	
Omertà		Luc Dionne	
Over My Dead Body		Brigitte Poupart	
Rooster Doodle Doo	Le Coq de St-Victor	Pierre Gréco	
Rose by Name		Shawn Linden	
Silence Is Gold	Le Prix des mots	Julien Fréchette	
Small Blind	La mise à l'aveugle	Simon Galiero	
Stay		Wiebke von Carolsfeld	
Thanatomorphose		Éric Falardeau	
The Torrent	Le Torrent	Simon Lavoie	
The Valley of Tears	La Vallée des larmes	Maryanne Zéhil	
War Witch	Rebelle	Kim Nguyen	
Where I Am	Là où je suis	Myriam Magassouba	
Wintergreen	Paparmane	Joëlle Desjardins Paquette	
With Jeff	Avec Jeff, à moto	Marie-Ève Juste	
2013
Absences	Absences	Carole Laganière	
Amsterdam	Amsterdam	Stephan Milejevic	
Another House	L'autre maison	Mathieu Roy	
Arwad	Arwad	Dominique Chila, Samer Najari	
Diego Star	Diego Star	Frédérick Pelletier	
The Dismantling	Le Démantèlement	Sébastien Pilote	
An Extraordinary Person	Quelqu'un d'extraordinaire	Monia Chokri	
Finissant(e)s	Finissant(e)s	Rafaël Ouellet	
The Four Soldiers	Les 4 soldats	Robert Morin	
Frameworks: Images of a Changing World	Dans un océan d'images	Helen Doyle	
Gabrielle	Gabrielle	Louise Archambault	
Hunting the Northern Godard	La Chasse au Godard d'Abbittibbi	Éric Morin	
Life's a Bitch	Toutes des connes	François Jaros	
Louis Cyr	Louis Cyr, l'homme le plus fort du monde	Daniel Roby	
Maïna	Maïna	Michel Poulette	
The Meteor	Le Météore	François Delisle	
A Mile End Tale	Conte du Mile End	Jean-François Lesage	
Québékoisie	Québékoisie	Mélanie Carrier, Olivier Higgins	
Riptide	Ressac	Pascale Ferland	
Rock Paper Scissors	Roche papier ciseaux	Yan Lanouette Turgeon	
Sarah Prefers to Run	Sarah préfère la course	Chloé Robichaud	
The Storm Within	Rouge sang	Martin Doepner	
Time Flies	Nous avions	Stéphane Moukarzel	
Tom at the Farm	Tom à la ferme	Xavier Dolan	
Triptych	Triptyque	Pedro Pires and Robert Lepage)	
Uvanga	Uvanga	Marie-Hélène Cousineau and Madeline Ivalu)	
Vic and Flo Saw a Bear	Vic et Flo ont vu un ours	Denis Côté	
Waiting for Spring	En attendant le printemps	Marie-Geneviève Chabot	
Whitewash	Whitewash	Emanuel Hoss-Desmarais	
2014
1987	1987	Ricardo Trogi	
3 Indian Tales	3 histoires d'indiens	Robert Morin	
Elephant Song		Charles Binamé	
An Eye for Beauty	Le règne de la beauté	Denys Arcand	
Felix and Meira	Félix et Meira	Maxime Giroux	
From Prisons to Prisons	De prisons en prisons	Steve Patry	
La Garde	La Garde	Sylvain Archambault	
Gore, Quebec	Gore, Quebec	Jean-Benoit Lauzon	
Guardian Angel	L'Ange gardien	Jean-Sébastien Lord	
Guidelines	La Marche à suivre	Jean-François Caissy	
Henri Henri	Henri Henri	Martin Talbot	
Joy of Man's Desiring	Que ta joie demeure	Denis Côté	
The Little Queen	La Petite Reine	Alexis Durand-Brault	
Love in the Time of Civil War	L'amour au temps de la guerre civile	Rodrigue Jean	
Love Project	Love Projet	Carole Laure	
The Masters of Suspense	Les Maîtres du suspense	Stéphane Lapointe	
Migration	Migration	Mark Lomond, Johanne Ste-Marie	
Miraculum	Miraculum	Daniel Grou	
Mommy	Mommy	Xavier Dolan	
Nina	Nina	Halima Elkhatabi	
Self(less) Portrait	Autoportrait sans moi	Danic Champoux	
Soif	Soif	Michèle Cournoyer	
Stranger in a Cab	Ceci n'est pas un polar	Patrick Gazé	
The Urban Farm	La ferme des humains	Onur Karaman	
Uyghurs: Prisoners of the Absurd	Ouïghours, prisonniers de l'absurde	Patricio Henríquez	
What Are We Doing Here?	Qu'est-ce qu'on fait ici ?	Julie Hivon	
The Wolves	Les Loups	Sophie Deraspe	
You're Sleeping Nicole	Tu dors Nicole	Stéphane Lafleur	
	Nouvelles, nouvelles	Olivier Godin	
2015
Adrien	Le Garagiste	Renée Beaulieu	
The Amina Profile	Le profil Amina	Sophie Deraspe	
Anna	Anna	Charles-Olivier Michaud	
Blue Thunder	Bleu tonnerre	Philippe David Gagné, Jean-Marc E. Roy	
Carface	Autos Portraits	Claude Cloutier	
Chorus	Chorus	François Delisle	
Death Dive	Le Scaphandrier	Alain Vézina	
The Demons	Les Démons	Philippe Lesage	
Le Dep	Le Dep	Sonia Boileau	
Endorphine	Endorphine	André Turpin	
Family Demolition	La démolition familiale	Patrick Damien-Roy	
Footprints	L'Empreinte	Yvan Dubuc, Carole Poliquin	
Gurov and Anna	Gurov et Anna	Rafaël Ouellet	
The Handout	Autrui	Micheline Lanctôt	
The Heart of Madame Sabali	Le coeur de Madame Sabali	Ryan McKenna	
Manor	Manoir	Martin Fournier, Pier-Luc Latulippe	
Maurice	Maurice	François Jaros	
The Mirage	Le Mirage	Ricardo Trogi	
My Enemies	Mes ennemis	Stéphane Géhami	
My Internship in Canada	Guibord s'en va-t-en guerre	Philippe Falardeau	
On My Mother's Side	L'Origine des espèces	Dominic Goyer	
L'Or du golfe	L'Or du golfe	Ian Jaquier	
Our Loved Ones	Les êtres chers	Anne Émond	
Overpass	Viaduc	Patrice Laliberté	
The Passion of Augustine	La passion d'Augustine	Léa Pool	
Paul à Québec	Paul à Québec	François Bouvier	
The Pedophile	Le Pédophile	Ara Ball	
Scratch	Scratch	Sébastien Godron	
The Sleepwalker	Sonámbulo	Theodore Ushev	
Snowtime!	La Guerre des tuques 3D	Jean-François Pouliot	
The Sound of Trees	Le Bruit des arbres	François Péloquin	
A Summer Love	Un amour d'été	Jean-François Lesage	
Ville-Marie	Ville-Marie	Guy Édoin	
Welcome to F.L.	Bienvenue à F.L.	Geneviève Dulude-De Celles	
Where Atilla Passes	Là où Atilla passe…	Onur Karaman	
2016
9	9, le film	Claude Brie, Érik Canuel, Jean-Philippe Duval, Marc Labrèche, Micheline Lanctôt, Luc Picard, Stéphane E. Roy, Éric Tessier, Ricardo Trogi	
The Art of Speech	Les Arts de la parole	Olivier Godin	
Bad Seeds	Les Mauvaises herbes	Louis Bélanger	
Before the Streets	Avant les rues	Chloé Leriche	
Boris Without Béatrice	Boris sans Béatrice	Denis Côté	
Boundaries	Pays	Chloé Robichaud	
Callshop Istanbul	Callshop Istanbul	Hind Benchekroun, Sami Mermer	
The Cyclotron	Le Cyclotron	Olivier Asselin	
Dead Leaves	Feuilles mortes	Thierry Bouffard, Steve Landry, Édouard Albernhe Tremblay	
Desert City	Déserts	Charles-André Coderre and Yann-Manuel Hernandez	
Faggot	Tapette	Olivier Perrier	
Harry: Portrait of a Private Detective	Harry: Portrait d’un détective privé	Maxime Desruisseaux	
It's Only the End of the World	Juste la fin du monde	Xavier Dolan	
A Kid	Le Fils de Jean	Philippe Lioret	
King Dave	King Dave	Daniel Grou	
Kiss Me Like a Lover	Embrasse-moi comme tu m’aimes	André Forcier	
Montreal, White City	Montréal la blanche	Bachir Bensaddek	
My Friend Dino	Mon ami Dino	Jimmy Larouche	
Nelly	Nelly	Anne Émond	
The New Life of Paul Sneijder	La nouvelle vie de Paul Sneijder	Thomas Vincent	
Nitro Rush	Nitro Rush	Alain DesRochers	
Of Ink and Blood	D’encre et de sang	Alexis Fortier Gauthier, Maxim Rheault, Francis Fortin	
The Other Side of November	L'Autre côté de novembre	Maryanne Zéhil	
	Pacte des anges	Richard Angers	
Perfect	Parfaites	Jérémie Battaglia	
Prank	Prank	Vincent Biron	
Shambles	Maudite poutine	Karl Lemieux	
Split	Écartée	Lawrence Côté-Collins	
The Squealing Game	La Chasse au collet	Steve Kerr	
Still Night, Still Light	Mes nuits feront écho	Sophie Goyette	
The 3 L'il Pigs 2	3 p’tits cochons 2	Jean-François Pouliot	
Those Who Make Revolution Halfway Only Dig Their Own Graves	Ceux qui font les révolutions à moitié n'ont fait que se creuser un tombeau	Mathieu Denis, Simon Lavoie	
	Toujours encore	Jean-François Boisvenue	
Tuktuq	Tuktuq	Robin Aubert	
Vortex	Vortex	Jephté Bastien	
Votez Bougon	Votez Bougon	Jean-François Pouliot	
Waseskun	Waseskun	Steve Patry	
We're Still Together		Jesse Noah Klein	
Wild Run: The Legend	Chasse-galerie: la légende	Jean-Philippe Duval	
2017
All You Can Eat Buddha	All You Can Eat Bouddha	Ian Lagarde	
Baggage	Bagages	Paul Tom	
Barefoot at Dawn	Pieds nus dans l'aube	Francis Leclerc	
Boost	Boost	Darren Curtis	
The Catch		Holly Brace-Lavoie	
Cielo	Cielo	Alison McAlpine	
Crème de menthe	Crème de menthe	Philippe David Gagné, Jean-Marc E. Roy	
Cross My Heart	Les Rois mongols	Luc Picard	
The Devil's Share	La Part du diable	Luc Bourdon	
Dolls Don't Cry	Toutes les poupées ne pleurent pas	Frédérick Tremblay	
Fake Tattoos	Faux tatouages	Pascal Plante	
Father and Guns 2	De père en flic 2	Émile Gaudreault	
The Hidden River	La rivière cachée	Jean-François Lesage	
Hochelaga, Land of Souls	Hochelaga terre des âmes	François Girard	
Infiltration	Le problème d'infiltration	Robert Morin	
Innu Nikamu: Resist and Sing	Innu Nikamu: Chanter la résistance	Kevin Bacon-Hervieux	
It's the Heart That Dies Last	C'est le cœur qui meurt en dernier	Alexis Durand-Brault	
The Little Girl Who Was Too Fond of Matches	La petite fille qui aimait trop les allumettes	Simon Lavoie	
Major Junior	Junior Majeur	Éric Tessier	
Origami	Origami	Patrick Demers	
Oscillations	Oscillations	Ky Nam Le Duc	
A Paradise Too Far	Y’est où le paradis?	Denis Langlois	
Ravenous	Les Affamés	Robin Aubert	
A Skin So Soft	Ta peau si lisse	Denis Côté	
Tadoussac	Tadoussac	Martin Laroche	
This Is Our Cup	Ça sent la coupe	Patrice Sauvé	
Threesome	Le trip à trois	Nicolas Monette	
We Are the Others	Nous sommes les autres	Jean-François Asselin	
Winter Claire	Claire l'hiver	Sophie Bédard Marcotte	
Worst Case, We Get Married	Et au pire, on se mariera	Léa Pool	
2018
1991	1991	Ricardo Trogi	
Black Forest	Forêt Noire	Philippe David Gagné, Jean-Marc E. Roy	
La Bolduc	La Bolduc	François Bouvier	
A Colony	Une colonie	Geneviève Dulude-De Celles	
Dark Suns	Soleils noirs	Julien Élie	
Destierros	Destierros	Hubert Caron-Guay	
Everything Outside	Everything Outside	David Findlay	
The Fall of Sparta	La chute de Sparte	Tristan Dubois	
The Fall of the American Empire	La chute de l'empire américain	Denys Arcand	
Family First	Chien de garde	Sophie Dupuis	
The Far Shore	Dérive	David Uloth	
The Fireflies Are Gone	La disparition des lucioles	Sébastien Pilote	
First Stripes	Premières armes	Jean-François Caissy	
For Those Who Don't Read Me	À tous ceux qui ne me lisent pas	Yan Giroux	
Genesis	Genèse	Philippe Lesage	
The Great Darkened Days	La grande noirceur	Maxime Giroux	
Happy Face	Happy Face	Alexandre Franchi	
Isla Blanca	Isla Blanca	Jeanne Leblanc	
Just a Breath Away	Dans la brume	Daniel Roby	
Mad Dog Labine	Mad Dog Labine	Jonathan Beaulieu-Cyr, Renaud Lessard	
The Nest	Le nid	David Paradis	
Pauline Julien, Intimate and Political	Pauline Julien: intime et politique	Pascale Ferland	
A Place to Live	Pour vivre ici	Bernard Émond	
Roads in February	Les routes en février	Katherine Jerkovic	
Les Salopes, or the Naturally Wanton Pleasure of Skin	Les salopes ou le sucre naturel de la peau	Renée Beaulieu	
Sashinka	Sashinka	Kristina Wagenbauer	
Slut in a Good Way	Charlotte a du fun	Sophie Lorain	
Those Who Come, Will Hear	Ceux qui viendront, l'entendront	Simon Plouffe	
Tia and Piujuq	Tia et Piujuq	Lucy Tulugarjuk	
Ville Neuve	Ville Neuve	Félix Dufour-Laperrière	
Waiting for April	En attendant avril	Olivier Godin	
When Love Digs a Hole	Quand l'amour se creuse un trou	Ara Ball	
With Love	L'Amour	Marc Bisaillon	
Xalko	Xalko	Sami Mermer, Hind Benchekroun	
Ziva Postec: The Editor Behind the Film Shoah	Ziva Postec : La monteuse derrière le film Shoah	Catherine Hébert	
2019
14 Days, 12 Nights	14 jours 12 nuits	Jean-Philippe Duval	
The Acrobat	L'Acrobate	Rodrigue Jean	
Alexander Odyssey	Alexandre le fou	Pedro Pires	
And the Birds Rained Down	Il pleuvait des oiseaux	Louise Archambault	
Antigone	Antigone	Sophie Deraspe	
Apapacho	Apapacho: une caresse pour l'âme	Marquise Lepage	
Barbarians of the Bay	Les Barbares de La Malbaie	Vincent Biron	
Before We Explode	Avant qu'on explose	Rémi St-Michel	
BKS	SDR	Alexa-Jeanne Dubé	
A Brother's Love	La femme de mon frère	Monia Chokri	
Cassy	Cassy	Noël Mitrani	
Compulsive Liar	Menteur	Émile Gaudreault	
Delphine	Delphine	Chloé Robichaud	
The Depths	Les profondeurs	Ariane Louis-Seize	
Fabulous	Fabuleuses	Mélanie Charbonneau	
Forgotten Flowers	Les Fleurs oubliées	André Forcier	
Ghost Town Anthology	Répertoire des villes disparues	Denis Côté	
The Greatest Country in the World	Le Meilleur pays du monde	Ky Nam Le Duc	
Havana, from on High	Sur les toits Havane	Pedro Ruiz	
Head First	Tenir tête	Mathieu Arsenault	
Heart Bomb	Une bombe au cœur	Rémi St-Michel	
Homeport	Port d'attache	Laurence Lévesque	
I'll End Up in Jail	Je finirai en prison	Alexandre Dostie	
Jarvik		Émilie Mannering	
Jouliks	Jouliks	Mariloup Wolfe	
Kenbe la, Until We Win	Kenbe la, jusqu'à la victoire	Will Prosper	
Kuessipan	Kuessipan	Myriam Verreault	
L.A. Tea Time	L.A. Tea Time	Sophie Bédard Marcotte	
The Last Nataq	Le dernier Nataq	Lisette Marcotte	
Living 100 MPH	Vivre à 100 milles à l'heure	Louis Bélanger	
Mafia Inc.	Mafia Inc.	Daniel Grou	
Mad Dog and the Butcher	Les Derniers vilains	Thomas Rinfret	
Matthias & Maxime	Matthias et Maxime	Xavier Dolan	
Mon ami Walid	Mon ami Walid	Adib Alkhalidey	
Mont Foster	Mont Foster	Louis Godbout	
The Prince of Val-Bé	Le Prince de Val-Bé	Jean-François Leblanc	
The Procession	Le Cortège	Pascal Blanchet, Rodolphe Saint-Gelais	
Rebel	Recrue	Pier-Philippe Chevigny	
Restless River	La rivière sans repos	Marie-Hélène Cousineau, Madeline Ivalu	
Rustic Oracle		Sonia Boileau	
The Seven Last Words	Les sept dernières paroles	Kaveh Nabatian, Juan Andrés Arango, Sophie Deraspe, Karl Lemieux, Ariane Lorrain, Sophie Goyette, Caroline Monnet	
Sisterhood	Ainsi soient-elles	Maxime Faure	
Speak Love	Speak Love	Emmanuel Tardif	
Sympathy for the Devil	Sympathie pour le diable	Guillaume de Fontenay	
Thanks for Everything	Merci pour tout	Louise Archambault	
The Twentieth Century	Le Vingtième Siècle	Matthew Rankin	
A Way of Life	Une manière de vivre	Micheline Lanctôt	
We Are Gold	Nous sommes Gold	Éric Morin	
We Had It Coming		Paul Barbeau	
Wilcox	Wilcox	Denis Côté	
Wintopia		Mira Burt-Wintonick	
A Woman, My Mother	Une femme, ma mère	Claude Demers	
Young Juliette	Jeune Juliette	Anne Émond	

== 2020s ==
English title	French title	Director	Ref
2020
The Brother	Le frère	Jérémie Battaglia	
Call Me Human	Je m'appelle humain	Kim O'Bomsawin	
The Castle	Le Château	Denys Desjardins	
The Decline	Jusqu'au déclin	Patrice Laliberté	
Flashwood	Flashwood	Jean-Carl Boucher	
Goddess of the Fireflies	La déesse des mouches à feu	Anaïs Barbeau-Lavalette	
Hibiscus Season	La saison des hibiscus	Éléonore Goldberg	
I Might Be Dead by Tomorrow	Tant que j'ai du respir dans le corps	Steve Patry	
In the Land of the Flabby Schnook	Au pays du cancre mou	Francis Gélinas	
Landgraves	Landgraves	Jean-François Leblanc	
Laughter	Le Rire	Martin Laroche	
The Marina	La Marina	Christophe Levac, Étienne Galloy	
Moon	Lune	Zoé Pelchat	
The Mother Eagle	Le Sang du pélican	Denis Boivin	
My Very Own Circus	Mon cirque à moi	Miryam Bouchard	
Nadia, Butterfly	Nadia, Butterfly	Pascal Plante	
Old Buddies	Les Vieux chums	Claude Gagnon	
Our Own	Les Nôtres	Jeanne Leblanc	
The Paper Man	Lafortune en papier	Tanya Lapointe	
Passage	Passage	Sarah Baril Gaudet	
Pink Lake	Pink Lake	Emily Gan, David Schachter	
Prayer for a Lost Mitten	Prière pour une mitaine perdue	Jean-François Lesage	
The Rose Family	Les Rose	Félix Rose	
Rumba Rules, New Genealogies	Rumba Rules, nouvelles généalogies	Sammy Baloji, David Nadeau-Bernatchez	
Scars		Alex Anna	
Sometimes I Wish I Was on a Desert Island	Y’a des fois où j’aimerais me trouver sur une île déserte	Eli Jean Tahchi	
The Sticky Side of Baklava	La Face cachée du baklava	Maryanne Zéhil	
Target Number One (a/k/a Most Wanted)	Suspect numéro un	Daniel Roby	
There Are No False Undertakings	Il n'y a pas de faux métier	Olivier Godin	
Underground	Souterrain	Sophie Dupuis	
Vacarme	Vacarme	Neegan Trudel	
The Vinland Club	Le Club Vinland	Benoît Pilon	
Wandering: A Rohingya Story	Errance sans retour	Mélanie Carrier, Olivier Higgins	
Without Havana	Sin la Habana	Kaveh Nabatian	
You Will Remember Me	Tu te souviendras de moi	Éric Tessier	
2021
Ain't No Time for Women	Y'a pas d'heure pour les femmes	Sarra El Abed	
Aline	Aline	Valérie Lemercier	
Alone	Seuls	Paul Tom	
Archipelago	Archipel	Félix Dufour-Laperrière	
Aska	Aska	Clara Milo	
Bad Seeds	Mauvaises herbes	Claude Cloutier	
Beneath the Surface	Le Lac des hommes	Marie-Geneviève Chabot	
The Benevolents	Les Bienveillants	Sarah Baril Gaudet	
Between Them	Toutes les deux	Noël Mitrani	
Big Giant Wave	Comme une vague	Marie-Julie Dallaire	
Bootlegger	Bootlegger	Caroline Monnet	
Brain Freeze	Brain Freeze	Julien Knafo	
Confessions of a Hitman	Confessions	Luc Picard	
La Contemplation du mystère	La contemplation du mystère	Albéric Aurtenèche	
Dear Jackie	Dear Jackie	Henri Pardo	
Dehors Serge dehors	Dehors Serge dehors	Martin Fournier, Pier-Luc Latulippe	
The Displeasure	La Grogne	Alisi Telengut	
Drunken Birds	Les oiseaux ivres	Ivan Grbovic	
Fanmi	Fanmi	Sandrine Brodeur-Desrosiers, Carmine Pierre-Dufour	
Far Beyond the Pasturelands	Au-delà des hautes vallées	Maude Plante-Husaruk, Maxime Lacoste-Lebuis	
Felix and the Treasure of Morgäa	Félix et le trésor de Morgäa	Nicola Lemay	
Gabor	Gabor	Joannie Lafrenière	
Goodbye Happiness	Au revoir le bonheur	Ken Scott	
Heirdoms	Soumissions	Emmanuel Tardif	
In the Jam Jar	In the Jam Jar	Colin Nixon	
Inès	Inès	Renée Beaulieu	
The Inhuman	L'Inhumain	Jason Brennan	
Joutel	Joutel	Alexa-Jeanne Dubé	
Like a House on Fire		Jesse Noah Klein	
Like the Ones I Used to Know	Les Grandes claques	Annie St-Pierre	
Livrés chez vous sans contact	Livrés chez vous sans contact	Gaëlle d'Ynglemare	
Maria	Maria	Alec Pronovost	
Maria Chapdelaine	Maria Chapdelaine	Sébastien Pilote	
Mimine	Mimine	Simon Laganière	
No Title	Pas de titre	Alexandra Myotte	
No Trace	Nulle trace	Simon Lavoie	
The Noise of Engines	Le bruit des moteurs	Philippe Grégoire	
North of Albany	Au nord d'Albany	Marianne Farley	
Nouveau Québec	Nouveau Québec	Sarah Fortin	
Ousmane	Ousmane	Jorge Camarotti	
The Perfect Victim	La parfaite victime	Monic Néron, Émilie Perreault	
Première vague	Première vague	Max Dufaud, Reda Lahmouid, Kevin T. Landry, Rémi Fréchette	
A Revision	Une révision	Catherine Therrien	
Sam	Sam	Yan England	
Social Hygiene	Hygiène sociale	Denis Côté	
They Dance With Their Heads	Ils dansent avec leurs têtes	Thomas Corriveau	
The Time Thief	L'Arracheuse de temps	Francis Leclerc	
Wars	Guerres	Nicolas Roy	
2022
III	III	Salomé Villeneuve	
The 12 Tasks of Imelda	Les 12 travaux d'Imelda	Martin Villeneuve	
305 Bellechasse	305 Bellechasse	Maxime-Claude L'Écuyer	
2012/Through the Heart	2012/Dans le cœur	Rodrigue Jean, Arnaud Valade	
About Memory and Loss	Notes sur la mémoire et l'oubli	Amélie Hardy	
Arlette	Arlette	Mariloup Wolfe	
Babysitter	Babysitter	Monia Chokri	
Blond Night	Nuit blonde	Gabrielle Demers	
Bloom	Jouvencelles	Fanie Pelletier	
Breathe	Respire	Onur Karaman	
Bungalow	Bungalow	Lawrence Côté-Collins	
The Cheaters	Les Tricheurs	Louis Godbout	
Coyote	Le Coyote	Katherine Jerkovic	
Dounia and the Princess of Aleppo	Dounia et la princesse d'Alep	André Kadi, Marya Zarif	
The Dream and the Radio	Le rêve et la radio	Renaud Després-Larose, Ana Tapia Rousiouk	
Falcon Lake	Falcon Lake	Charlotte Le Bon	
Family Game	Arsenault et fils	Rafaël Ouellet	
The Family of the Forest	La famille de la forêt	Laura Rietveld	
How to Get Your Parents to Divorce	Pas d'chicane dans ma cabane!	Sandrine Brodeur-Desrosiers	
Humus	Humus	Carole Poliquin	
I Lost My Mom	J'ai placé ma mère	Denys Desjardins	
In Broad Daylight	Au grand jour	Emmanuel Tardif	
Invincible	Invincible	Vincent René-Lortie	
Lines of Escape	Lignes de fuite	Catherine Chabot, Miryam Bouchard	
Mistral Spatial	Mistral Spatial	Marc-Antoine Lemire	
Montreal Girls	Montréal Girls	Patricia Chica	
Niagara	Niagara	Guillaume Lambert	
A Night for the Dogs	A Night for the Dogs	Max Woodward	
Noemie Says Yes	Noémie dit oui	Geneviève Albert	
Norbourg	Norbourg	Maxime Giroux	
Nut Jobs	Les Pas d'allure	Alexandre Leblanc	
Oasis	Oasis	Justine Martin	
The Origin of Evil	L'Origine du mal	Sébastien Marnier	
Rodeo	Rodéo	Joëlle Desjardins Paquette	
The Switch	La Switch	Michel Kandinsky	
That Kind of Summer	Un été comme ça	Denis Côté	
This House	Cette maison	Miryam Charles	
Three Times Nothing	Trois fois rien	Nadège Loiseau	
Two Days Before Christmas	23 décembre	Miryam Bouchard	
Upwelling	Je me soulève	Hugo Latulippe	
Very Nice Day	Très belle journée	Patrice Laliberté	
Viking	Viking	Stéphane Lafleur	
White Dog	Chien blanc	Anaïs Barbeau-Lavalette	
Zug Island	Zug Island	Nicolas Lachapelle	
2023
Afterwards	Après-coups	Romane Garant Chartrand	
Atikamekw Suns	Soleils Atikamekw	Chloé Leriche	
Beyond Paper	Au-delà du papier	Oana Suteu Khintirian	
Billie Blue	Cœur de slush	Mariloup Wolfe	
Coco Farm	Coco Ferme	Sébastien Gagné	
A Crab in the Pool	Un trou dans la poitrine	Jean-Sébastien Hamel, Alexandra Myotte	
Days	Les Jours	Geneviève Dulude-De Celles	
Days of Happiness	Les Jours heureux	Chloé Robichaud	
Death to the Bikini!	À mort le bikini!	Justine Gauthier	
The Dishwasher	Le Plongeur	Francis Leclerc	
Dusk for a Hitman	Crépuscule pour un tueur	Raymond St-Jean	
Echo to Delta	Écho à Delta	Patrick Boivin	
The Eighth Floor	Le huitième étage, jours de révolte	Pedro Ruiz	
Emptiness	Emptiness	Onur Karaman	
Evergreen$	Sapin$	Stéphane Moukarzel	
Eviction	Éviction	Mathilde Capone	
Farador	Farador	Édouard Albernhe Tremblay	
Fire-Jo-Ball	Fire-Jo-Ball	Audrey Nantel-Gagnon	
Frontiers	Frontières	Guy Édoin	
Gaby's Hills	Gaby les collines	Zoé Pelchat	
Gamma Rays	Les rayons gamma	Henry Bernadet	
Heat Spell	L'Été des chaleurs	Marie-Pier Dupuis	
Humanist Vampire Seeking Consenting Suicidal Person	Vampire humaniste cherche suicidaire consentant	Ariane Louis-Seize	
Ireland Blue Book	Irlande cahier bleu	Olivier Godin	
Kanaval	Kanaval	Henri Pardo	
Katak: The Brave Beluga	Katak, le brave béluga	Christine Dallaire-Dupont, Nicola Lemay	
Little Jesus	Petit Jésus	Julien Rigoulot	
Madeleine	Madeleine	Raquel Sancinetti	
Mademoiselle Kenopsia	Mademoiselle Kenopsia	Denis Côté	
Manufacturing the Threat	Produire la menace	Amy Miller	
Marie. Eduardo. Sophie.	Marie. Eduardo. Sophie.	Thomas Corriveau	
My Mother's Men	Les Hommes de ma mère	Anik Jean	
The Nature of Love	Simple comme Sylvain	Monia Chokri	
On Earth as in Heaven	Sur la terre comme au ciel	Nathalie Saint-Pierre	
One Summer	Le Temps d'un été	Louise Archambault	
Outside Center	Outside Center	Eli Jean Tahchi	
Perséides	Perséides	Laurence Lévesque	
Red Rooms	Les Chambres rouges	Pascal Plante	
A Respectable Woman	Une femme respectable	Bernard Émond	
Return to Hairy Hill	Retour à Hairy Hill	Daniel Gies	
Richelieu	Richelieu	Pier-Philippe Chevigny	
Ru	Ru	Charles-Olivier Michaud	
Solo	Solo	Sophie Dupuis	
Sweet Sixteen	Sucré seize	Alexa-Jeanne Dubé	
Tell Me Why These Things Are So Beautiful	Dis-moi pourquoi ces choses sont si belles	Lyne Charlebois	
Testament	Testament	Denys Arcand	
Under Influence	Emma sous influence	Noël Mitrani	
Until You Die	Jusqu'à ce que tu meures	Florence Lafond	
Victoire	La Cordonnière	François Bouvier	
Virga	Virga	Jean-François Leblanc	
When Adam Changes	Adam change lentement	Joël Vaudreuil	
The White Guard	La Garde blanche	Julien Élie	
Wild Feast	Festin boréal	Robert Morin	
You'll Never Know	Tu ne sauras jamais	Robin Aubert	
	Jour de merde	Kevin T. Landry	
	Max Funk: Pour ton funk seulement	Alexandre Dubois, Alexandre B. Lampron, Guy Chagnon, Benoît Ash	
2024
1+1+1 Life, Love, Chaos	1+1+1 ou La vie, l’amour, le chaos	Yanie Dupont-Hébert	
1995	1995	Ricardo Trogi	
Ababooned	Ababouiné	André Forcier	
After the Odyssey	Au lendemain de l'odyssée	Helen Doyle	
After the Silence	Après le silence	Matilde-Luna Perotti	
All Stirred Up!	Tous toqués!	Manon Briand	
Among Mountains and Streams	Parmi les montagnes et les ruisseaux	Jean-François Lesage	
At All Kosts	Koutkékout	Joseph Hillel	
At the End of Nothing at All	Au boute du rien pantoute	Jérôme Sabourin	
The Battle of Saint-Léonard	La bataille de Saint-Léonard	Félix Rose	
Being at Home	Habiter la maison	Renée Beaulieu	
Billy	Billy	Lawrence Côté-Collins	
Blue Sky Jo	La petite et le vieux	Patrice Sauvé	
Dissolution	Se fondre	Simon Lavoie	
Extras	Extras	Marc-Antoine Lemire	
Foyers	Foyers	Zachary Ayotte	
Ghosts of the Sea	Les Enfants du large	Virginia Tangvald	
Hello Stranger	Hello Stranger	Amélie Hardy	
Himalia	Himalia	Clara Milo, Juliette Lossky	
Hola Frida!	Hola Frida!	André Kadi, Karine Vézina	
Hotel Silence	Hôtel Silence	Léa Pool	
Hunting Daze	Jour de chasse	Annick Blanc	
Ibuka, Justice	Ibuka, Justice	Justice Rutikara	
The Last Meal	Le Dernier repas	Maryse Legagneur	
Like a Spiral	Comme une spirale	Lamia Chraibi	
The Little Shopping Trolley	Le petit panier à roulettes	Laurence Ly	
Living Together	Cohabiter	Halima Elkhatabi	
Louis Riel, or Heaven Touches the Earth	Louis Riel ou Le ciel touche la terre	Matias Meyer	
Lucy Grizzli Sophie	Lucy Grizzly Sophie	Anne Émond	
Malartic	Malartic	Nicolas Paquet	
Mercenaire	Mercenaire	Pier-Philippe Chevigny	
Miss Boots	Mlle Bottine	Yan Lanouette Turgeon	
Okurimono	Okurimono	Laurence Lévesque	
Out for Ice Cream	Crème à glace	Rachel Samson	
The Painting	Le Tableau	Michèle Lemieux	
Phoenixes	Phénix	Jonathan Beaulieu-Cyr	
Rituals Under a Scarlet Sky	Rituels sous un ciel écarlate	Dominique Chila, Samer Najari	
Seeing Through the Darkness	Les yeux ne font pas le regard	Simon Plouffe	
Scratches of Life: The Art of Pierre Hébert	Graver l'homme: arrêt sur Pierre Hébert	Loïc Darses	
Shepherds	Berger	Sophie Deraspe	
Simon and Marianne	Simon et Marianne	Pier-Luc Latulippe, Martin Fournier	
Sisters and Neighbors!	Nos belles-sœurs	René Richard Cyr	
Someone's Trying to Get In	Someone's Trying to Get In	Colin Nixon	
The Thawing of Ice	La fonte des glaces	François Péloquin	
Universal Language	Une langue universelle	Matthew Rankin	
Vile & Miserable	Vil et Misérable	Jean-François Leblanc	
Waiting for Casimir	En attendant Casimir	Christian Mathieu Fournier	
Who by Fire	Comme le feu	Philippe Lesage	
Wild Flowers	Les Fleurs sauvages	Rodolphe Saint-Gelais, Thierry Sirois	
You Are Not Alone	Vous n'êtes pas seul	Marie-Hélène Viens, Philippe Lupien	
	La femme cachée	Bachir Bensaddek	
2025
Anna Kiri	Anna Kiri	Francis Bordeleau	
Barbaracadabra	Barbaracadabra	Barbara Ulrich, Renaud Lessard	
Barbie Boomer	Barbie Boomer	Marc Joly-Corcoran	
Bassima's Womb	Le ventre de Bassima	Babek Aliassa	
Best Boy		Jesse Noah Klein	
Cardboard City	Ville Jacques-Canton	Jean-Marc E. Roy, André Forcier	
Compulsive Liar 2	Menteuse	Émile Gaudreault	
The Cost of Heaven	Gagne ton ciel	Mathieu Denis	
Death Does Not Exist	La mort n'existe pas	Félix Dufour-Laperrière	
The Draft	The Draft	Jephté Bastien	
Fanny	Fanny	Yan England	
Follies	Folichonneries	Eric K. Boulianne	
The Furies	Les Furies	Mélanie Charbonneau	
The Flayed, Part 2	Les Écorchés, partie 2	Luca Jalbert	
I Lost Sight of the Landscape	J'ai perdu de vue le paysage	Sophie Bédard Marcotte	
Inner-Walls	Au pied du mur	Alexandra Elkin	
James Bay 1975: The Shock of Two Nations	Baie James 1975 : le choc des Nations	Mélanie Lameboy, Myriam Berthelet, Mathieu Fournier	
Lovely Day	Mille secrets mille dangers	Philippe Falardeau	
Mad Dog	Molosse	Marc-Antoine Lemire	
Maurice	Maurice	Serge Giguère	
The Mechanics of Borders	La mécanique des frontières	Hubert Caron-Guay	
Mile End Kicks		Chandler Levack	
My Memory-Walls	Mes murs-mémoires	Axel Robin	
My Stepmother Is a Witch	Ma belle-mère est une sorcière	Joëlle Desjardins Paquette	
Nesting	Peau à peau	Chloé Cinq-Mars	
Old Guys in Bed		Jean-Pierre Bergeron	
Once Upon My Mother	Ma mère, Dieu et Sylvie Vartan	Ken Scott	
Paul	Paul	Denis Côté	
Peak Everything	Amour Apocalypse	Anne Émond	
Platanero	Platanero	Juan Frank Hernandez	
The Punk of Natashquan	Le Punk de Natashquan	Nicolas Lachapelle	
Space Cadet	Space Cadet	Kid Koala	
A Thousand Colours	Recomposée	Nadia Louis-Desmarchais	
Tie Man		Rémi Fréchette	
The Train	Le Train	Marie Brassard	
Two Women	Deux femmes en or	Chloé Robichaud	
Waiting for the Storms	Le Temps	François Delisle	
We Will Not Be Silenced	Que le silence ne l'emporte pas	Catherine Hébert, Elric Robichon	
Where Souls Go	Où vont les âmes?	Brigitte Poupart	
Who Killed the Montreal Expos?	Qui a tué les Expos de Montréal?	Jean-François Poisson	
	À travers tes yeux	Brigitte Poupart	
	Chiennes de faïence	Marie-Hélène Panisset	
	Crise d'ado	Marc-André Lavoie	
	Désolé, pardon, je m’excuse	Estévan Morin	
	Hank est en ville	Feber E. Coyote	
	Pédalo	Stéphane E. Roy	
2026
Almost Pink	Presque rose	Justine Prince	
L'Autre	L'Autre	Alexandre Franchi	
The Final Act	Le Dernier acte	Sophie Deraspe	
François.e	François.e	Jean-François Asselin	
Haunted	Hantée	Rafaël Ouellet	
Labrador: Autopsy of Silence	Labrador - Autopsie du silence	Rodrigue Jean	
Ladies and Gentlemen, Brian Mulroney	Mesdames et Messieurs, Brian Mulroney	Matthew Rankin	
Lydia and the Mist Rider	Lydia et le vaisseau des tempêtes	Émilie Rosas, Philippe Arseneau Bussières, Nancy Florence Savard	
Nina Roza	Nina Roza	Geneviève Dulude-De Celles	
Nobody's Violence	Violence du corps de l'autre	Denis Côté	
Paradise	Paradise	Jérémy Comte	
The Parking Spot	La Place	Louis Godbout	
Pauline	Pauline Julien: femme pays	Anaïs Barbeau-Lavalette	
Redemptions	Rédemptions	Luc Picard	
Romin	Romin	Anthony Dionne, Jassen Charron	
Skinny Boots	Skinny Bottines	Romain F. Dubois	
So Long Pluto	Au revoir Pluton	Sarianne Cormier	
Someone's Daughter		Wiebke von Carolsfeld	
Tight Lettuce	Tissé serré	Harrison Houde	
Toy Gun Bandit	Faux gun bandit	Rémi St-Michel	
Villeneuve: The Rise of a Legend	Villeneuve : l'ascension d'une légende	Yan Lanouette Turgeon	
You Will Be Free	Ma fille tu seras libre	Bachir Bensaddek	

== See also ==
- Cinema of Quebec
- Prix Iris
- List of Quebec film directors
- Culture of Quebec
- List of French-language Canadian television series
- List of Canadian films
