= Kid Sentiment =

1968 Canadian docufiction film

- Directed by: Jacques Godbout
- Written by: Jacques Godbout; Ghislaine Godbout
- Produced by: Clément Perron
- Starring: Andrée Cousineau; François Guy; Michèle Mercure; Louis Parizeau
- Cinematography: Thomas Vámos
- Edited by: Jacques Godbout
- Production company: National Film Board of Canada
- Release date: 1968
- Running time: 87 minutes
- Country: Canada
- Language: French

Kid Sentiment is a Canadian docufiction film, directed by Jacques Godbout and released in 1968. Mixing fiction with documentary in the direct cinema style and working with a cast of non-professional actors, the film depicts 1960s youth culture through a narrative fiction story about four teenagers in Quebec City mixed with segments in which Godbout directly interviews the actors about their goals, values and philosophies of life.

The film starred Andrée Cousineau, François Guy, Michèle Mercure and Louis Parizeau, as well as writer Jacques Languirand in a supporting role. Guy and Parizeau were real-life musicians with the Montreal rock band Les Sinners, who provided two songs for the film's soundtrack, while Cousineau and Mercure were go-go dancers Guy and Parizeau knew from the club scene; Mercure was the daughter of actress Monique Mercure.

The film was a Canadian Film Award nominee for Best Feature Film at the 20th Canadian Film Awards in 1968. Following its Canadian theatrical premiere in 1968, the film was screened in the Director's Fortnight stream at the 1969 Cannes Film Festival.

The film was later released on DVD, with a 1967 episode of the Canadian television variety series Let's Go as a bonus feature.

Parizeau later left the music business and became a private investigator. In 2019, he appeared in the documentary film Head First (Tenir tête) to speak about mental health challenges after having been diagnosed with bipolar disorder.
