= Gilles Blais =

Canadian filmmaker (1941–2025)

- Born: 1941; Rimouski, Quebec, Canada
- Died: October 17, 2025 (aged 84); Val-David, Quebec, Canada
- Occupation: Filmmaker

Gilles Blais (1941 – October 17, 2025) was a Canadian documentary filmmaker and cinematographer from Quebec, most noted for his long career with the National Film Board of Canada.

== Background ==
Born in Rimouski and raised in the then-outlying village of Le Bic, he began his career as an assistant cameraman on the 1967 film In the Labyrinth.

He was subsequently an assistant director on Jean Pierre Lefebvre's Straight to the Heart (Jusqu'au cœur), and Jean Beaudin's Vertige.

== Directing career ==
He began directing short and medium-length documentaries in 1971, with credits including Water, Water Everywhere... (Heureux comme un poisson dans l'eau...), The Netsilik Eskimo Today, The Port of Montreal, Soils of Canada and Sophie Wollock's Newspaper. Throughout this time, he also worked as a cinematographer on work by other directors, helped to set up a video production unit in Tunisia, and shot several films on human settlement and development for the United Nations.

He made his feature-length debut in 1981 with The Followers (Les Adeptes), a documentary about followers of the Hare Krishna religious tradition. He followed up in 1984 with Les Illusions tranquilles, a reflection on the political divide between youth and adult citizens of Quebec through the lens of a municipal election in his hometown.

In 1991, he directed the docudrama Joseph K.: The Numbered Man (Joseph K.: L'homme numéroté). He followed up in 1993 with The Engagement (Les Fiancés de la tour Eiffel), about a Quebec-based troupe of actors with intellectual disabilities putting on a stage production at the European Festival of Mentally Disabled Artists. The film was the winner of the Grand Prix Hydro-Québec at the 1993 Abitibi-Témiscamingue International Film Festival.

Le Grand silence, released in 1997, was his final film for the National Film Board before his retirement. He continued to work in the private sector as a cinematographer, receiving a Gemini Award nomination for Best Photography in an Information Program or Series at the 16th Gemini Awards in 2001 for his work on the documentary television series Her Money.

He returned to filmmaking in 2005 with Conventum, a documentary about the 50th anniversary of the Quiet Revolution.

== Death ==
He died at his home in Val-David on October 17, 2025, at the age of 84.
