= André-Line Beauparlant =

Canadian film designer and director

André-Line Beauparlant (born 1966 in Montreal, Quebec) is a Canadian art director, production designer, set decorator, and film director. She was nominated for a Genie Award for Best Achievement in Art Direction/Production Design for Continental, a Film Without Guns (Continental, un film sans fusil) at the 28th Genie Awards, and for Happy Camper (Camping sauvage), The Negro (Le nèg'), and The Woman Who Drinks (La Femme qui boit) at the 25th Genie Awards. At the 28th Genie Awards, she was also nominated for Best Feature Length Documentary for her film Antlers (Panache).

In 2002, she was nominated for three Jutra Awards: Best Art Direction for The Woman Who Drinks and Marriages (Mariages), and Best Documentary for Three Princesses for Roland (Trois princesses pour Roland).

She is an alumna of the University of Montreal and a 1993 graduate of the National Theatre School of Canada.

In 2018, she was nominated for Best Art Direction at the Prix Iris for Infiltration.

In 2026 she released the documentary film This Love, These Days (Mon amour, c’est pour le restant de mes jours), centred on her relationship with filmmaker Robert Morin.
