= Xalko =

2018 Canadian documentary film

- Film poster
- Directed by: Sami Mermer; Hind Benchekroun
- Produced by: Sami Mermer; Hind Benchekroun
- Cinematography: Sami Mermer
- Edited by: René Roberge
- Production company: Les Films de la tortue
- Distributed by: Les Films du 3 Mars
- Release date: November 9, 2018 (RIDM)
- Running time: 100 minutes
- Country: Canada
- Languages: Kurdish; Turkish; French

Xalko is a Canadian documentary film, directed by Sami Mermer and Hind Benchekroun and released in 2018. The film profiles Mermer's own birthplace of Xalko, a Kurdish village in Turkey where the women are preserving Kurdish tradition after most of the men have left as refugees from the Kurdish–Turkish conflict.

The film premiered in November 2018 at the Montreal International Documentary Festival. It won the Prix Iris for Best Documentary Film at the 22nd Quebec Cinema Awards in 2020, and Mermer received a nomination for Best Cinematography in a Documentary.
