= Still Night, Still Light (film) =

- Poster
- French: Mes nuits feront écho
- Directed by: Sophie Goyette
- Written by: Sophie Goyette
- Produced by: Sophie Goyette
- Starring: Éliane Préfontaine; Gerardo Trejoluna; Felipe Casanova
- Cinematography: Léna Mill-Reuillard
- Edited by: Sophie Goyette
- Music by: Éliane Préfontaine
- Distributed by: La Distributrice de films
- Release date: October 11, 2016 (FNC)
- Running time: 98 minutes
- Country: Canada
- Languages: French; English; Spanish; Mandarin

Still Night, Still Light (French: Mes nuits feront écho) is a Canadian drama film, directed by Sophie Goyette and released in 2016. The film stars Éliane Préfontaine as Éliane, a woman dealing with depression who temporarily abandons her life in Montreal and travels to Mexico City, where she stays at a home owned by Romes (Gerardo Trejoluna) and takes a job teaching his son to play piano; Romes, meanwhile, is planning to accompany his ailing father Pablo (Felipe Casanova) on a trip to Asia which may be Pablo's last major dream in his life.

The film's cast also includes Marie-Ginette Guay and Monique Spaziani. It is thematically related to, but not a direct remake of, Goyette's 2011 short film La Ronde, which also starred Préfontaine.

The film premiered at the 2016 Festival du nouveau cinéma, before opening commercially in January 2017.

The film was a nominee for the DGC Discovery Award at the 2017 Directors Guild of Canada awards. It was shortlisted for the Prix collégial du cinéma québécois in 2018.
