= Wilcox (film) =

- Directed by: Denis Côté
- Written by: Denis Côté
- Produced by: Denis Côté; Annie St-Pierre
- Starring: Guillaume Tremblay
- Cinematography: François Messier-Rheault
- Edited by: Matthew Rankin
- Music by: Roger Tellier-Craig
- Production companies: GreenGround Productions; Inspiratrice & Commandant
- Distributed by: Inspiratrice & Commandant
- Release date: August 11, 2019 (Locarno)
- Running time: 66 minutes
- Country: Canada
- Budget: $10,000

Wilcox is a Canadian drama film, directed by Denis Côté and released in 2019. Told entirely without dialogue, the film tells the story of Wilcox (Guillaume Tremblay), a mysterious drifter travelling in an apparent search for adventure. Although he does interact with other characters in the film, the dialogue taking place in the story is not heard by the audience.

Le Devoir described the film as "not a documentary, not a fiction, not a direct cinema, but a little bit of all three forms."

The film was shot in October 2018 in a variety of communities in Quebec, including Bécancour and several small towns in the Montérégie region.

The film premiered at the 2019 Locarno Film Festival. It was later screened at the 2019 Montreal International Documentary Festival, where it was awarded the Special Jury Prize by the Canadian national feature jury.

== Release ==
Wilcox was released on video-on-demand on March 3, 2020 by Inspiratrice & Commandant.
