= Callshop Istanbul =

- Theatrical release poster
- Directed by: Hind Benchekroun; Sami Mermer
- Produced by: Hind Benchekroun; Sami Mermer, Turtle Films
- Edited by: Hind Benchekroun, Sami Mermer
- Distributed by: Multi-Monde
- Release date: November 19, 2015
- Running time: 96 minutes
- Country: Canada

Callshop Istanbul is a 2015 documentary film by two film directors, the Moroccan-Canadian Hind Benchekroun and Turkish-Kurdish-Canadian Sami Mermer and produced by Turtle Films, depicting some intimate footage of the life of immigrants and of undocumented street vendors residing in cosmopolitan Istanbul. Many migrants and refugees mainly from Asia, Africa and the Arab World found temporary refuge in Istanbul considering it as their gateway to Europe and elsewhere. To cater for a great demand of communication, telephone and internet access by refugees, a booming network of "call shops" and "internet cafés" spread all over Istanbul to provide an affordable way for these refugees from all over the world to communicate with their relatives back home or for facilitating their life in the city or to help them in their plans to immigrate elsewhere. The film portrays often one-way phone conversations by the refugees in their most intimate and vulnerable moments. The film is also a subtle witness of the complicated role of Istanbul as a transcontinental city including proliferation of would-be smugglers and traffickers promising shady and often dangerous routes for immigration to Europe with Istanbul serving as a passageway for the 21st century's largest migration crisis.

The film was showcased in a number of film festivals, notably the "Canadian Spectrum" portion of the Hot Docs Canadian International Documentary Festival. and during the "Canadian feature competition" at the Rencontres internationales du documentaire de Montréal (RIDM) and at the International Film Festival Rotterdam.

Callshop Istanbul is distributed in Canada and worldwide by Multi-Monde.
