= François Guy (singer) =

- Born: 1947; Montreal, Quebec, Canada
- Died: May 12, 2023 (aged 75–76); Labelle, Quebec, Canada
- Occupations: Songwriter, Composer, Singer, Actor, Playwright
- Notable work: "Québécois"

François Guy (1947 – 12 May 2023) was a Québécois songwriter, composer, singer, actor and playwright.

== Biography ==
François Guy was born in 1947 in Saint-Henri, Montreal, Quebec, Canada.

In 1965, he joined the group Les Sinners, for which he wrote texts and sang. His cousin Louis Parizeau was also in the group. He left the group in spring 1968.

In late 1968, he founded the group Révolution Française with previous members of Les Sinners. He participated in the album C-Cool and then wrote the song "Québécois", which was the greatest musical success of 1969 in Quebec, becoming the best-selling single in 1970 with more than 100,000 copies sold. He left the Révolution Française in autumn 1969.

In 1970, he starred in the Québécois version of the musical Hair. He was then part of the trio James, John et François with Jay Boivin and Jean-Guy Durocher. They performed in the US in English before dissolving in 1971.

François Guy then pursued a solo career. He published his first solo album with the help of Robert Charlebois. He published the successful discs "Elle, elle est là", "Fidèle" et "Coup de foudre" and staged the revues Tout chaud (1976), Circociel (1976), Paquet-voleur (1977) and L'île en ville (1979). He then reoriented his career toward talent development, but came back to songwriting. He released an album in 1983 before stopping publishing discs, and then wrote songs for commercials and films. He was also a playwright and an actor in theater.

In 1992, he returned to the stage as a singer at the Saint-Jean-Baptiste Day show at Jarry Park. His song "Québécois", with some modifications, was the show's theme.

In the mid-2000s, François Guy came back to making his own songs, releasing the album Je préfère le bonheur in 2010. His song "Québécois" was inducted in the Canadian Songwriters Hall of Fame in 2018.

François Guy wrote songs for the group Toulouse and Véronique Béliveau.

François Guy died on 12 May 2023 after a bad fall at his cottage in Labelle, Quebec, Canada.

== Discography ==
Singles
Year	Title
1968	Madame Robinson / Yummy Yummy
1970	Pensez donc avec vos pieds / Hier au soir
1970	Aouaie viens t’en / Changez d’eau
1971	Come In
1971	Carolina Guy / Run Run
1971	Caroline / Va, va, cours, cours
1971	Six O’Clock In The Morning / I Do Believe In Music
1971	Aimons-nous les uns les autres / Y’avait que nous deux
1971	L’hiver / Amour
1972	C’est l’hymen
1974	Take Me / Allright
1974	Elle, elle est là / J’devrais-tu te dire
1974	À l’aide / Chérie, chérie
1975?	Elle, elle est là / Take Me
1976	Reviens vite / Une petite fille comme ça
1976	Sans vous / Grenouillardise
1977	Paquet voleur / Martinique On The Rock
1978	Tout le monde tout nu / Y’a des soirs
1979	Fidèle / Bilodeau le mafioso
1979	Péché d’amour / Partons
1981?	J’aime l’eau / N’avoir rien
1983	Mon corps est un hors-la-loi / Flâner sous la mer
1984	The Ballad Of Frankie Foo / Down In Rio
1984	22 sous zéro / Instrumental
1984	Coup de foudre / Jeux
1984	Maintenant ou jamais / À pas de loup
1985	L’amour l’amour / Tout comme le mois de mai — L’ABC de Félix

Albums
Year	Title
1973	François Guy
1976	Circociel
1978	Nuit blanche
1984	François Guy
2010	Je préfère le bonheur

== Filmography ==
Films
Year	Title
1968	Kid Sentiment
1977	L'âge de la machine

Television shows
Year	Title
1995	Avec un grand A
