= Denis Côté =

Canadian filmmaker and producer

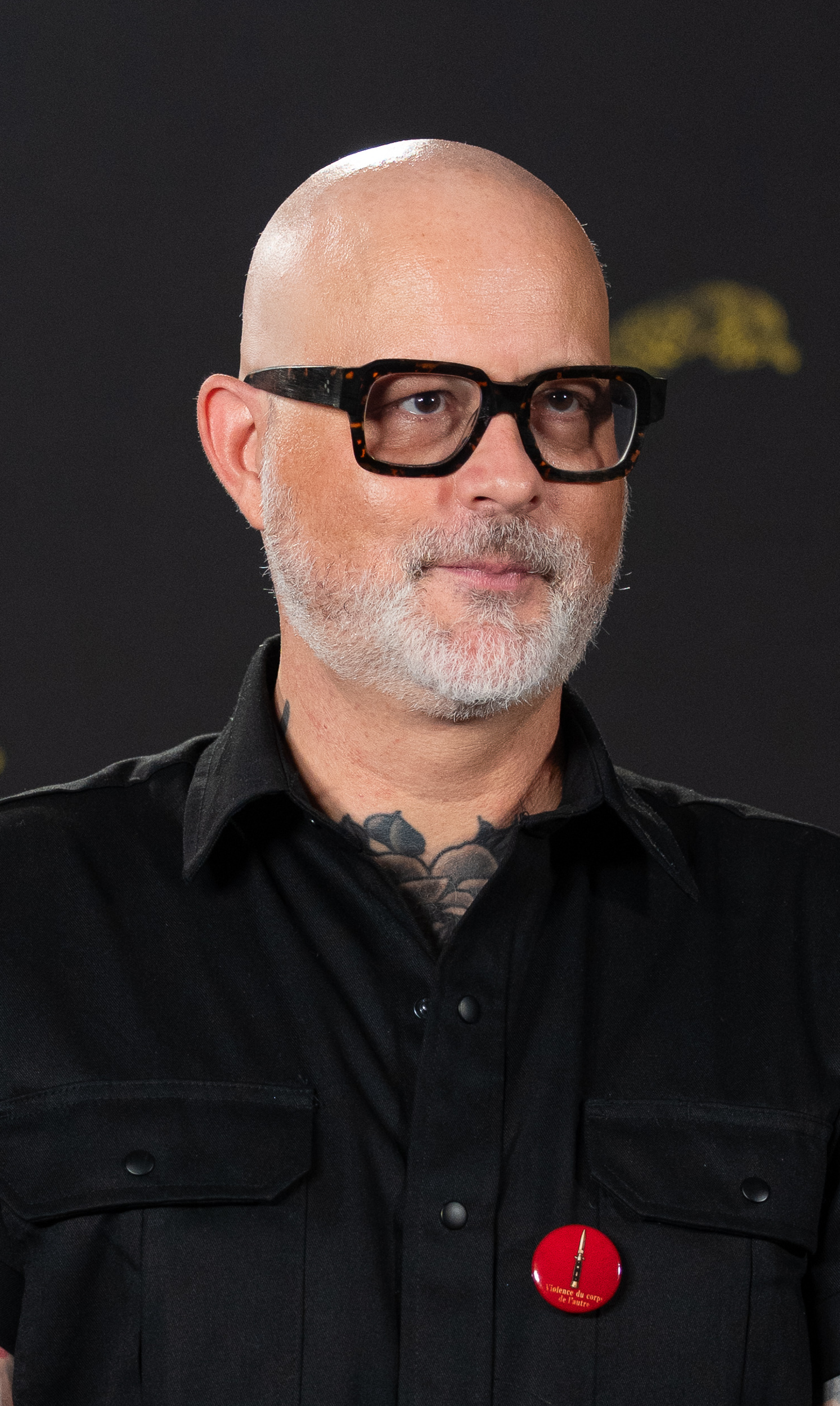
- Côté in 2026
- Born: 16 November 1973 (age 52); Perth-Andover, New Brunswick, Canada
- Occupations: Independent filmmaker and producer

Denis Côté (born November 16, 1973) is a Canadian filmmaker and producer from Quebec, and of Brayon origin. His experimental films have been shown at major film festivals around the world.

== Life and career ==
Côté was born in Perth-Andover, New Brunswick, Canada. He studied film at Collège Ahuntsic in Montreal and founded Nihil Productions around 1994. He made a number of short films, including Kosovolove (2000) and La sphatte (2003). He has also been a film critic on radio, at ici magazine from 1999 to 2005, and vice-president of the Quebec association of film critics (Association québécoise des critiques de cinéma, or AQCC).

In 2005, his first feature film, Drifting States (Les états nordiques), won the Golden Leopard - Video at the Locarno International Film Festival (in a tie with The Masseur), as well as the Woosuk Award (Indie Vision) at the Jeonju International Film Festival.

His 2007 film Our Private Lives (Nos vies privées) was filmed in Bulgarian. The 2008 film All That She Wants (Elle veut le chaos), his third feature film, won the silver Leopard for best directing at the Locarno International Film Festival and Best Canadian film at the Festival international du cinéma francophone en Acadie. Jean-Michel Frodon, editor-in-chief of Cahiers du Cinéma at the time, made it one of his top 10 picks for best film of 2008.

In October 2008, there was a retrospective of his work at the Cinémathèque québécoise.

The 2009 documentary Carcasses was presented at the Cannes Film Festival at the Directors' Fortnight in May 2009. It was part of the Canada Top Ten at the Toronto International Film Festival.

At the end of May 2010 at the Festival TransAmériques, he created a video accompaniment for the play Cendres directed by Jérémie Niel (based on Earth and Ashes by Atiq Rahimi).

The 2010 "short" film (43 minutes) The Enemy Lines (Les Lignes ennemies) was part of the Jeonju Digital Project at the Jeonju International Film Festival, where it had its world premiere.

In August 2010, his feature film Curling was presented at the Locarno International Film Festival, where it won the prize for best directing as well as the prize for best actor (Emmanuel Bilodeau). It was released in France in October 2011, to positive critical reviews.

At the end of October and beginning of November 2010, the Viennale presented a retrospective of his work, as did the Festival de La Rochelle in 2011.

His 2012 documentary Bestiaire, filmed at Parc Safari in Hemmingford, Quebec, had its world premiere at the Sundance Film Festival and was also shown at the Berlin Film Festival.

Côté also produced the film Mona's Daughters (Le Cèdre penché) by Rafaël Ouellet in 2007. His 2013 film Vic and Flo Saw a Bear premiered in competition at the 63rd Berlin International Film Festival, where it won the Alfred Bauer Prize. Vic and Flo Saw A Bear was screened in about 90 film festivals, was released in a dozen countries and to this day, Denis Côté's work has been offered more than 20 retrospectives around the world. In 2014, he returned to Berlinale with a new essay film, Joy of Man's Desiring (Que ta joie demeure).

For his ninth feature film Boris Without Béatrice (Boris sans Béatrice) in 2016, Côté teamed up with local star actor James Hyndman and imagines the life of fictitious businessman Boris Malinovsky. The film premiered at the 66th Berlin International Film Festival in 2016.

In 2015, Ministry of Culture and Communications (France) officially named Côté a Knight of the Order of the Arts and Letters.

A Skin So Soft (Ta peau si lisse) features six real-life bodybuilders and had its world premiere on August 4, 2017, at the 70th Locarno International Film Festival. Variety praised the 'eclectic approach' of the film. The Upcoming UK called it a 'bewitching and admirable piece of work'. Shot in winter 2018 but screened in Competition at Berlinale 2019, Ghost Town Anthology is a return to a more narrative version of Côté's signature. Based on a poetic novel by young auteur Laurence Olivier and uniting a stellar cast of local stars and newcomers, Ghost Town Anthology sees the dead silently return to a small rural town following the suicide of a young man. The film opened to positive reviews, hits the festival circuit and is seen as a mournful drama that defies genre categorization. The film received 10 nominations at the 20th Quebec Cinema Awards.

Later the same year he released Wilcox, a film following a fictional mysterious wanderer, happily lost in the Canadian wilderness.

Côté has described his own filmmaking style in interviews by stating that he has no ambitions to make "consensual" movies that everybody loves, and has claimed that he does not consider one of his films to be successful unless at least a few people walk out of the screening.

In October 2024 he was named the recipient of the Prix Albert-Tessier for his body of work in film.

== Filmography ==
Year	English title	Original title	Notes
2005	Drifting States	Les états nordiques	
2007	Our Private Lives	Nos vies privées	
2008	All That She Wants	Elle veut le chaos	
2009	Carcasses		
2010	The Enemy Lines	Les lignes ennemies	
2010	Curling		
2012	Bestiaire		
2013	Vic and Flo Saw a Bear	Vic+Flo ont vu un ours	
2014	Joy of Man's Desiring	Que ta joie demeure	Documentary
2016	Boris Without Béatrice	Boris sans Béatrice	
2017	A Skin So Soft	Ta peau si lisse	Documentary
2019	Ghost Town Anthology	Répertoire des villes disparues	
2019	Wilcox		
2021	Social Hygiene	Hygiène sociale	
2022	That Kind of Summer	Un été comme ça	
2023	Mademoiselle Kenopsia		
2025	Paul		Documentary
2026	Nobody's Violence	Violence du corps de l'autre	

=== Short films ===
- 1997 - Des tortues dans la pluie
- 1999 - Old Fashion Waltz
- 2000 - Second Waltz (Seconde valse)
- 2000 - Kosovolove
- 2001 - Rejoue-moi ce vieux mélodrame
- 2002 - Mécanique de l’assassin
- 2003 - La sphatte
- 2005 - Toys (Les jouets)
- 2005 - Tennessee
- 2007 - Maïté
- 2011 - Sans titre
- 2015 - Excursions (Excursoes)
- 2015 - May We Sleep Soundly (Que nous nous assoupissions)
- 2020 - Cnfnmnt e/scp(i)sm
- 2021 - Renegade Breakdown Live
- 2024 - Days Before the Death of Nicky (Jours avant la mort de Nicky)

== Accolades ==
- 2001 - Seconde valse: Best editing at the Atlantic Film Festival (Halifax, Canada)
- 2004 - La sphatte: Bronze prize at Brno B16 (Czech Republic)
- 2005 - Les états nordiques: Golden Leopard - Video at the Locarno International Film Festival (Switzerland)
- 2006 - Les états nordiques: Indie Vision grand prize at Jeonju (Korea)
- 2008 - Elle veut le chaos: Best directing at the Locarno International Film Festival (Switzerland)
- 2008 - Elle veut le chaos: Special mention from the youth jury at Locarno (Switzerland)
- 2008 - Elle veut le chaos: Best Canadian film at the Festival international du cinéma francophone en Acadie (Moncton, Canada)
- 2010 - Curling: Best directing at the Locarno International Film Festival (Switzerland)
- 2010 - Curling: Leopard for best actor (Emmanuel Bilodeau) at the Locarno International Film Festival (Switzerland)
- 2012 - Bestiaire Best experimental Feature Greenpoint Film Festival (US)
- 2013 - Vic and Flo Saw A Bear Alfred Bauer Preis (Innovation Prize) 63rd Berlinale (Germany)
- 2013 - Vic and Flo Saw A Bear Best Script FIFF Namur (Belgium)
- 2014 - Vic and Flo Saw A Bear Jutra Award for Best Actress - Pierrette Robitaille (Quebec)
- 2014 - Joy of Man's Desiring Jury Special Mention FICUNAM Mexico
- 2019 - Ghost Town Anthology Best film (FIPRESCI Award at 37th Festival Cinematografico Internacional del Uruguay
- 2021 - Social Hygiene Best director Award - Berlinale (Encounters)
- 2021 - Social Hygiene Best director Award - FAJR Teheran Film Festival (Iran)
