= Hind Benchekroun =

Moroccan-Canadian documentary filmmaker

Hind Benchekroun is a Moroccan-Canadian documentary filmmaker, who was cofounder of the Films de la tortue documentary film studio with her husband Sami Mermer. The duo are most noted for their 2018 film Xalko, which won the Prix Iris for Best Documentary Film at the 22nd Quebec Cinema Awards in 2020.

Benchekroun worked in film and television, including as editor of Mermer's 2006 film The Box of Lanzo (La boîte de Lanzo), before making her directorial debut as codirector with Mary Fowles of the documentary film Taxi Casablanca in 2009, with Mermer serving as that film's cinematographer.

Turtles Do Not Die of Old Age (Les tortues ne meurent pas de vieillesse), her first full co-directing collaboration with Mermer, was released in 2010, and was a nominee for Best Documentary at the 14th Jutra Awards in 2012. They followed up in 2016 with Callshop Istanbul, which was a nominee for Best Documentary at the 19th Quebec Cinema Awards in 2017.
