= Three Princesses for Roland =

2001 Canadian documentary film

- French: Trois princesses pour Roland
- Directed by: André-Line Beauparlant
- Produced by: Danielle Leblanc
- Starring: Madeleine Robert; Nathalie Lebeau; Caroline Fuglewicz
- Cinematography: Robert Morin
- Edited by: Sophie Leblond
- Production company: Co-op Vidéo de Montréal
- Release date: 2001
- Running time: 91 minutes
- Country: Canada
- Language: French

Three Princesses for Roland (French: Trois princesses pour Roland) is a Canadian documentary film, directed by André-Line Beauparlant and released in 2001. Following the suicide of her alcoholic uncle Roland four years earlier, the film profiles the effect of his life and death on his widow Madeleine, daughter Nathalie and granddaughter Caroline.

The film was nominated for the Jutra Award for Best Documentary Film at the 4th Jutra Awards in 2002.
