= Sami Mermer =

Sami Mermer is a Turkish Canadian documentary filmmaker of Kurdish descent.

== Biography ==
Mermer was born in Turkey. He studied mathematics at the University of Ankara from 1994 to 1996 and from 1996 to 2000, Environment Engineering at the University of Istanbul. He pursued cinema studies at the University of Mesopotamia from 1998 to 2000 followed by studies of French and Cinema Studies at the University of Quebec from 2000 to 2002.

He worked on several documentaries and fiction films, as a director and director of photography. He was co-writer and assistant director of Ax (the land), winner of several prizes and awarded best film in the 2000 Hamburg Film Festival. In Grand Rapids, Michigan, he co-directed, with Aaron B. Smith a short fiction film called Sortie, winner of Compass School for Cinematic Arts 24 Hour Film competition.

The Box of Lanzo, 102 minutes, was his first feature documentary about homeless people which he directed, edited and shot almost entirely in Grand Rapids, Michigan. In 2006, he collaborated as writer/director & DP with Benjamin Hoekstra on a feature-length fiction project, The Extra shot in both Los Angeles and Michigan, and since reduced to a short film.

From December 2006 to July 2007 Mermer lived in Morocco and launched a production company called Turtle Productions with Hind Benchekroun based in Montreal and Casablanca.

Mermer has lived in Montreal since July 2007. In 2015, he released in collaboration with Benchekroun the long feature documentary film Callshop Istanbul, about life of refugees from all over the world in Istanbul, a gateway to immigration to Europe. In 2018, Mermer and Benchekroun released their third feature documentary film, titled Xalko. The film looks at Xalko, a kurdish village in Turkey, deserted by its men who have gone to Europe or America. It explores migration from the point of view those left behind. The film was selected in many festivals, including Montreal International Documentary Festival (RIDM) and DOXA Documentary Film Festival. It won the Prix Iris for Best Documentary Film at the 22nd Quebec Cinema Awards in 2020, and Mermer received a nomination for Best Cinematography in a Documentary. In 2019, Mermer made his last film, a short fiction called (The Room), in which he gave a little rolls to his daughters, Zeliha and Louna...

== Filmography ==
Director

- 1999: Ax (the land), Fiction. Turkey. (as co-writer, director assistant). 27 min.
  - Best film in Hamburg film festival (Germany, 2000)
  - Second best film in Milano (Italy, 2000)
- 2004-2005: The Box of Lanzo, Doc./Fiction. Grand Rapids, MI. (as writer, director, camera, producer). 14 min.
  - World Urban Forum, United Nations, Vancouver.
  - Broadcast online on Citizenshift, website of The National Film Board of Canada.
  - Market Clermont-Ferrand, France.
  - Casablanca International Short and Documentary Film Festival.
- 2005: Sortie, Fiction. Grand Rapids, MI. (as writer, director). 5 min.
  - Casablanca International Short and Documentary Film Festival.
- 2005: La petite fille d’avant, Documentary. Grand Rapids, MI. 19 min.
- 2006–11: The Extra, Fiction. (as writer-director (w/ Benjamin Hoekstra), cinematography). 10 min.
- 2007: The Box of Lanzo, long version, Doc./Fiction. Grand Rapids. 100 min.
  - Flint Film Festival, 2007.
  - UICA, Grand Rapids, MI.
- 2010: Turtles Do Not Die of Old Age (Les tortues ne meurent pas de vieillesse), 2010, Documentary. Morocco.
- 2016: Callshop Istanbul, Documentary jointly with Hind Benchekroun
- 2018: Xalko

Others

- 1999: Photograph, Fiction. Turkey. (as actor). 70 min.
- 2004: Rumour, Fiction. Grand Rapids. (as camera) Dir. Benjamin Hoekstra. 30 min.
- 2005: Pompiste, fiction. New York, New Jersey. Writer.
- 2007: Les Traces du Temps, Casablanca, writer, director, producer
- 2007: Vendeurs ambulant, Casablanca, writer, director, producer
- 2007: Last stop Istanbul, writer, director, producer
- 2007: Victoria, Fiction. (as camera assistant and lighting) Dir. Anna Karina.
- 2007: Misafir, Fiction. Dir. Eylem Kaftan.
- 2007: Taxi Casablanca Documentary. (as cinematographer). Dir. Hind Benchekroun and Mary Fowles.
