= Head First (film) =

2019 Canadian documentary film

- French: Tenir tête
- Directed by: Mathieu Arsenault
- Written by: Mathieu Arsenault
- Produced by: Nathalie Barton
- Starring: Mathieu Arsenault; Frédérique Ménard-Aubin; Louis Parizeau
- Cinematography: Mathieu Arsenault
- Edited by: Mathieu Arsenault; Jean-André Fourestié
- Music by: Caracol; Seb Ruban
- Production company: InformAction Films
- Release date: February 28, 2019 (RVQC)
- Running time: 78 minutes
- Country: Canada
- Language: French

Head First (French: Tenir tête) is a Canadian documentary film, directed by Mathieu Arsenault and released in 2019. Inspired by Arsenault's own diagnosis with bipolar disorder in the mid-2010s, the film profiles his experiences and those of two other people living with the disease, photographer Frédérique Ménard-Aubin and former musician Louis Parizeau, both to educate viewers about mental health and to portray their efforts to avoid allowing their lives to be consumed or controlled by the condition.

The film premiered on February 28, 2019 at the Rendez-vous Québec Cinéma.

Arsenault received a Canadian Screen Award nomination for Best Cinematography in a Documentary at the 8th Canadian Screen Awards in 2020.
