= Albert Tessier =

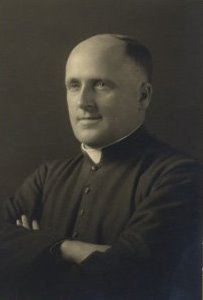
- Albert Tessier, c. 1938
- Born: March 6, 1895; Sainte-Anne-de-la-Pérade, Quebec, Canada
- Died: September 13, 1976 (aged 81); Trois-Rivières, Quebec, Canada
- Occupations: priest, historian and film maker

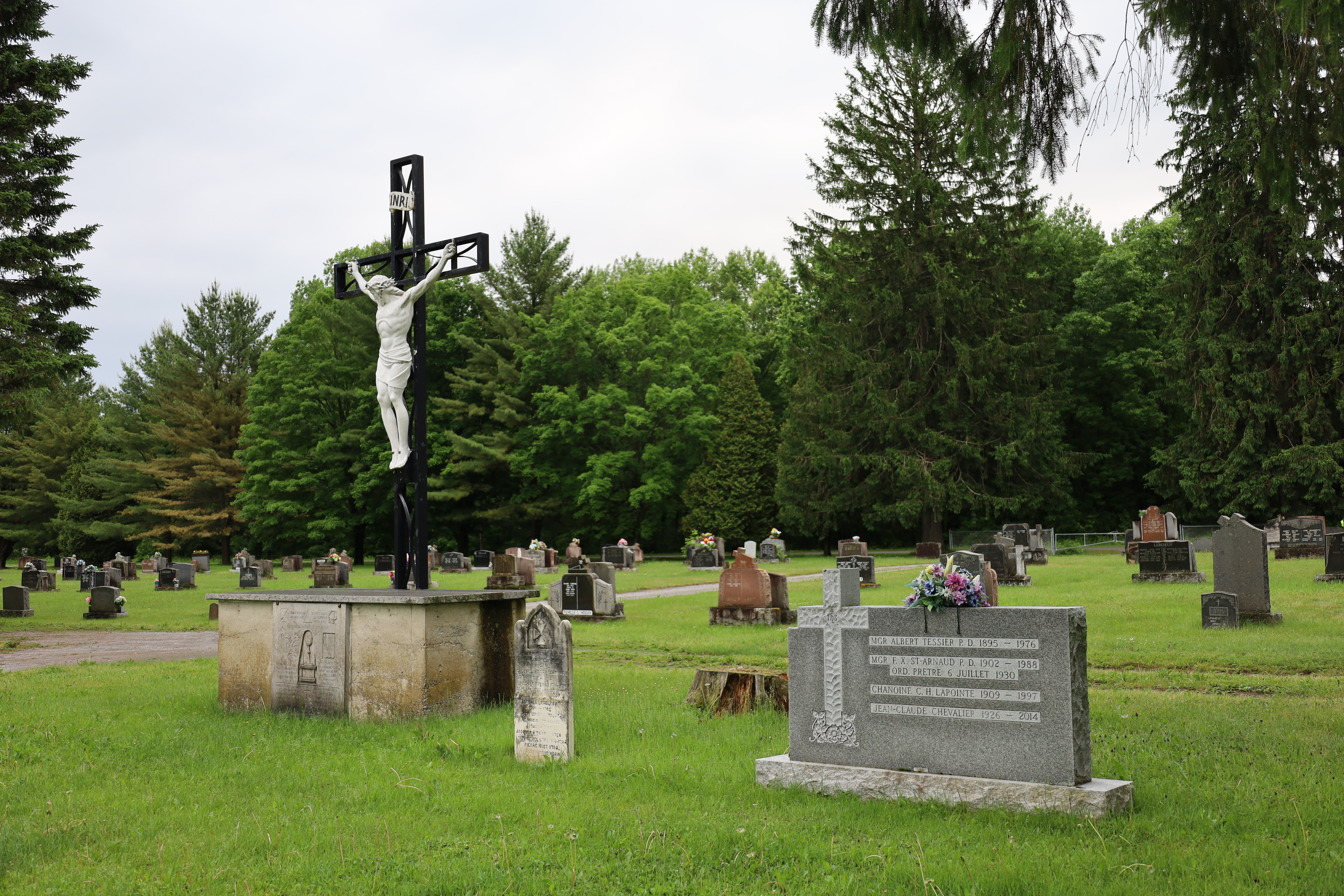
Sainte-Anne-de-la-Pérade cemetery, tombstone Mgr Albert Tessier (1895-1976), Mgr. F. X. St-Arnaud (1902-1988), Canon C. H. Lapointe (1909-1997), Jean-Claude Chevalier (1926-2014)

Albert Tessier ((French pronunciation: [albɛʁ tɛsje]); March 6, 1895 – September 13, 1976) was a French-speaking Canadian priest, historian and a film maker.

He was born in Sainte-Anne-de-la-Pérade, Mauricie.

Tessier made over seventy films.

Tessier started taking photographs with his Kodak Brownie in 1913.

== Life as a Priest and Educator ==
He was ordained priest by Monsignor François-Xavier Cloutier in June 1920 and received a PhD in Theology in Rome in 1922. He moved back to his native area in 1924 and began a career as a teacher and professor of history and literature. In 1937, he replaced Thomas Chapais and took over the Chair in History of Canada at the Université Laval.

== Promoting Local Identity ==
Tessier was known to be very proud of his area of origin. He coined the word Mauricie in 1933 to designate his native area. Before then, the expression "Saint-Maurice Valley" had been used. Many of the movies that he produced informed the public about the area's background.

== Filmography ==
From 1925 until his death, Tessier made more than seventy non-fiction films. His favorite subjects were nature, history, religion, education and culture.

Film	Date
Arbres et bêtes	1942-1943
Artisanat familial	1939-1942
Baie d'Hudson	1950
Bénissez le Seigneur	1937
Les Bourgault	1940
C'est l'aviron qui nous mène	1942
Cantique de la Création	1942
Cantique du soleil	1935
Centenaire	1934
Chutes de divers films d'Albert Tessier	
Congrès eucharistique trifluvien	1941
Conquête constructive	1939
Credo du paysan	1942
Dans le bois	1925-1930
Démonstrations religieuses trifluviennes	1933-1936
Des Trois-Rivières à la Rivière-au-Rat visite à La Pierre	1941-1944
La Mauricie	1952
Écoles de bonheur	1954
Écoles et écoliers	1939-1940
Écoles ménagères régionales	1942
Écoles ménagères régionales femmes dépareillées	1942
Femme forte	1938
Femmes dépareillées réalisation et commentaires	1948
La forêt bienfaisante	1942-1943
Gloire à l'eau	1935-1950
La Grande vie tonifiante de la forêt	1942-1943
Hommage à notre paysannerie	1938
L'Île-aux-Coudres	1939
L'Île-aux-Grues, terre de sérénité	1939
L'Île d'Orléans, reliquaire d'histoire	1939
L'Île fleurie	1939
Indiens de la Mauricie	1936
Ma famille	1938
Le Miracle du curé Chamberland	1938
Mont-Carmel	1939
Parki-parka	1951
La Pêche	1937-1940
Pot-pourri d'animaux	1940-1950
Pour aimer ton pays	1942
Quatre artistes canadiens	1938-1948
Ralliements ménagers	1949-1951
Rocheuses	1950
Tavibois	1950
Tourisme nautique	1936
Trois-Rivières	1949
Trois-Rivières	1932
Trois-Rivières	1934
Trois-Rivières sous la neige	1937
Un sport passionnant; La chasse aux images	1936-1942

== Death ==
Albert Tessier died at the Saint-Joseph Hospital in Trois-Rivières on September 13, 1976.

== Legacy ==
The following were named in Tessier's honor:

- The Prix Albert-Tessier award;
- Avenue Albert-Tessier, located in Shawinigan, Quebec.
- Pavillon Albert-Tessier, located at Université du Québec à Trois-Rivières

== Works cited ==
- Pallister, Janis (1995). The Cinema of Quebec: Masters in Their Own House. Associated University Presses. ISBN 0838635628.
