= Drifting States =

- French: Les États nordiques
- Directed by: Denis Côté
- Written by: Denis Côté
- Produced by: Denis Côté
- Starring: Christian LeBlanc
- Cinematography: Denis Laplante
- Edited by: Rafaël Ouellet
- Production company: Nihilproductions
- Release date: 2005
- Running time: 95 minutes
- Country: Canada
- Language: French
- Budget: C$80,000

Drifting States (French: Les États nordiques) is a 2005 Canadian docufiction drama film written and directed by Denis Côté. Starring Christian LeBlanc alongside residents of Radisson, the film follows a Montreal man starting over in a remote northern Quebec town. It was Côté’s feature-length debut, combines documentary and fictional elements, and won the Golden Leopard in the Video category at the 2005 Locarno Film Festival.

== Synopsis ==
The film follows Christian, a Montreal man who ends life support for his comatose mother after she has been in hospital for a long time. He then drives nearly 2,000 kilometres north to Radisson. The remote town is home to man people who came in the 1970s to work on a large hydroelectric project. There, he starts over among the town’s residents and tries to come to terms with his past.

== Cast ==
The cast includes Christian LeBlanc and residents of Radisson.

== Production ==
Côté's feature-length debut, the film was shot digitally on a budget of C$80,000 and combines fiction and documentary elements. Côté later described it as having one professional actor working with the residents of a small village.

== Reception ==
=== Critical response ===
Writing for 24 images, André Roy compared the film to the works of Jacques Leduc, particularly Ordinary Tenderness (Tendresse ordinaire) and The Last Glacier (Le dernier glacier).

Adam Nayman of POV Magazine wrote that Côté’s work "ebbs and flows between the imperatives of documentary and drama", and described the film as opening with a man’s euthanasia of his mother before turning to the residents of an isolated Quebec community.

=== Awards ===
The film won a Golden Leopard in the Video category at the Locarno Film Festival in 2005, and a Woosuk Award at the Jeonju International Film Festival in 2006.
