= Carcasses (film) =

- Film poster
- Directed by: Denis Côté
- Written by: Denis Côté
- Produced by: Sylvain Corbeil; Denis Côté; Stéphanie Morissette
- Starring: Jean-Paul Colmor
- Cinematography: Ilio Kotorenchev
- Edited by: Maxime-Claude L'Écuyer
- Production companies: Nihilproductions; Visit Films
- Distributed by: FunFilm
- Release dates: February 21, 2009 (RVCQ); May 21, 2009 (Directors' Fortnight)
- Running time: 72 minutes
- Country: Canada
- Language: French
- Budget: C$60,000

Carcasses is a 2009 Canadian docufiction film written and directed by Denis Côté. Starring Jean-Paul Colmor alongside a non-professional cast, the film centres on a scrapyard owner in Saint-Amable, Quebec. It screened at the Directors’ Fortnight in Cannes and was named to TIFF’s Canada’s Top Ten list for 2009.

== Synopsis ==
Blending documentary and fictionalized elements, the film centres on Jean-Paul Colmor, a 74-year-old scrapyard owner whose property in Saint-Amable, Quebec is filled with thousands of old cars. It first follows Colmor’s daily routine and isolated life, before shifting direction when four teenagers with Down syndrome arrive at the scrapyard.

== Cast ==
The cast consists of non-professional performers, including Jean-Paul Colmor, Étienne Grutman, Célia Léveillée-Marois, Mark Scanlon, Charles-Élie Jacob, Julie Rouvière and Anne Carrier.

== Production ==
The film was produced by nihilproductions. It was written and directed by Denis Côté. Filming took place in Saint-Amable, Quebec, over eight days as part of Côté’s residency at the Montreal art centre PRIM. The film had an approximate budget of C$60,000. It combines documentary and fictional elements around Jean-Paul Colmor and the scrapyard where he lives and works. Most of the film was shot in long takes that observe Colmor’s daily routines before introducing staged elements.

== Release ==
Carcasses had its world premiere at the Rendez-vous du cinéma québécois on February 21, 2009. It was later shown at the Directors’ Fortnight in Cannes on May 21, 2009. After Cannes, the film played briefly at cinemas in Montreal and Quebec City, and was released on DVD by FunFilm on January 26, 2010.

== Reception ==
Writing for Variety, Rob Nelson described parts of the film as "enjoyably eccentric", while calling its fictional turn a "sketchy provocation". He also noted the film’s blend of documentary observation and fictional elements.

Adam Nayman of POV Magazine described the film as "an austere portrait of a rugged individualist", and wrote that it changes direction after other figures enter Colmor’s world.

Ho Yi of the Taipei Times wrote that the film begins as a "contemplative documentary", before its scripted dramatic elements unsettle the viewer’s "assumptions and sense of certitude".

== Recognition ==
The film was named to the Toronto International Film Festival's year-end Canada's Top Ten list for 2009.
