= Paul (2025 film) =

- Directed by: Denis Côté
- Produced by: Karine Bélanger; Hany Ouichou
- Distributed by: Mongrel Media
- Release date: February 15, 2025 (Berlin)
- Running time: 80 minutes
- Country: Canada
- Language: French

Paul is a 2025 Canadian documentary film, directed by Denis Côté. The film centres on Paul, a man struggling with severe social anxiety who socializes mainly online and supports himself with a job as a home and work cleaner for dominatrixes.

The film premiered in February 2025 at the 75th Berlin International Film Festival.

== Critical response ==
Allan Hunter of Screen Daily wrote that the film "does meander a little at times and risks becoming repetitive as Paul is once again tied up or restrained. Mostly, however, it remains engaging and offers a persuasive testimony to the sense of empowerment that can come from the unlikeliest of places."

The film won the Special Jury Prize from the Best Canadian Feature Documentary jury at the 2025 Hot Docs Canadian International Documentary Festival.
