= Sophie Goyette =

Canadian film director and screenwriter

Sophie Goyette is a Canadian film director and screenwriter. She is most noted for her 2012 short film The Near Future (Le futur proche), which was a Canadian Screen Award nominee for Best Live Action Short Drama at the 1st Canadian Screen Awards, and a Prix Jutra nominee for Best Short Film at the 15th Jutra Awards.

She was also a Genie Award nominee for Best Live Action Short Drama at the 32nd Genie Awards for La Ronde, which was named to the Toronto International Film Festival's year-end Canada's Top Ten list for 2011.

Her debut feature film, Still Night, Still Light (Mes nuits feront écho), was released in 2016, and was a nominee for the Directors Guild of Canada's DGC Discovery Award in 2017. For her work on the film, Goyette was awarded the Bright Futures Award at the International Film Festival Rotterdam.

In 2019 she was one of seven directors, alongside Kaveh Nabatian, Juan Andrés Arango, Sophie Deraspe, Karl Lemieux, Ariane Lorrain and Caroline Monnet, of the anthology film The Seven Last Words (Les sept dernières paroles).
