= All That She Wants (2008 film) =

- French: Elle veut le chaos
- Directed by: Denis Côté
- Written by: Denis Côté
- Produced by: Denis Côté; Stéphanie Morissette
- Starring: Eve Duranceau; Normand Lévesque; Laurent Lucas
- Cinematography: Josée Deshaies
- Edited by: Sophie Leblond
- Production company: Nihilproductions
- Distributed by: FunFilm
- Release dates: August 11, 2008 (Locarno Film Festival); December 5, 2008
- Running time: 104 minutes
- Country: Canada
- Language: French
- Budget: C$1 million

All That She Wants (French: Elle veut le chaos) is a 2008 Canadian drama film written and directed by Denis Côté. Starring Eve Duranceau, Normand Lévesque and Laurent Lucas, the film centres on a young woman living in isolation with her stepfather in a criminal environment. It premiered in the international competition at the Locarno Film Festival, where Côté won the Golden Leopard for Best Direction.

== Synopsis ==
The film centres on Coralie, a young woman living in an isolated area with her stepfather Jacob, an ex-mobster. After the disappearance of Coralie’s mother, the two face financial hardship and threats from dangerous criminals, while Coralie prepares to rebel against her circumstances.

== Cast ==
The cast includes:

- Eve Duranceau as Coralie
- Normand Lévesque as Jacob
- Laurent Lucas as Pierrot
- Nicolas Canuel as Spazz
- Olivier Aubin as Pic
- Réjean Lefrançois as Alain
- Lesya Samar as Katerina
- Catherine Erofeeva as Yelena

== Production ==
The film was produced by nihilproductions, with participation from Telefilm Canada and SODEC. It was written and directed by Denis Côté. Josée Deshaies shot the film in black and white. Filming took place in Contrecoeur from September to October 2007. The film had an approximate budget of C$1 million.

== Release ==
The film had its world premiere in the international competition at the Locarno Film Festival in August 2008. It was theatrically released on December 5, 2008, and was released on DVD and video-on-demand by FunFilm on July 7, 2009.

== Reception ==
=== Critical response ===
Jay Weissberg of Variety called the film’s plot "deliberately opaque", and wrote that it was "best to focus on the cerebral cinematography" rather than the relationships or motivations.

Ray Bennett of The Hollywood Reporter described the film as "moody and sometimes indecipherable", but praised Côté’s visual setting and the cast’s performances despite a "ragged script".

Amber Wilkinson of Eye for Film praised the film’s visual design, calling Côté’s framing "exquisite", but wrote that viewers expecting a straightforward narrative would likely find the film frustrating.

=== Awards ===
At the 2008 Locarno Film Festival, Denis Côté won the Golden Leopard for Best Direction for the film.
