= Jean-Philippe Pearson =

Canadian actor, screenwriter (born 1970)

- Born: 1970 (age 55–56); Ottawa, Ontario, Canada
- Occupation: Actor, writer, director, visual artist
- Years active: 1990s–present

Jean-Philippe Pearson (born 1970) is a Canadian actor, screenwriter and director. He is most noted as cowriter with Patrice Robitaille and Ricardo Trogi of the film Québec-Montréal (2002), for which they won the Jutra Award for Best Screenplay at the 5th Jutra Awards in 2003.

He was also a Genie Award nominee for Best Original Screenplay at the 23rd Genie Awards for Québec-Montréal, and Jutra Award winner for Best screenplay for Québec-Montréal and Oliver Award winner for best comedy 2005 Dodging the Clock (Horloge biologique).

He directed and wrote Bonheur des autres (film, 2011)|Le Bonheur des autres in 2011.

== Filmography ==
Year	Film	Role	Notes
2002	Québec-Montréal	JP	
2005	Dodging the Clock (Horloge biologique)	Sébastien 'Seb' Langevin	
2007	Bluff (Bluff)	L'Ouvrier	
