= Turtles Do Not Die of Old Age =

2010 Canadian documentary film

- French: Les tortues ne meurent pas de vieillesse
- Directed by: Sami Mermer; Hind Benchekroun
- Written by: Sami Mermer; Hind Benchekroun
- Produced by: Sami Mermer; Hind Benchekroun
- Cinematography: Sami Mermer
- Edited by: René Roberge
- Production company: Les Films de la tortue
- Distributed by: Les Films du 3 Mars
- Release date: November 2010 (RIDM)
- Running time: 92 minutes
- Countries: Canada; Morocco
- Language: Arabic

Turtles Do Not Die of Old Age (French: Les tortues ne meurent pas de vieillesse) is a Canadian-Moroccan documentary film, directed by Sami Mermer and Hind Benchekroun and released in 2010. The film profiles three elderly men in Morocco who have effectively become keepers of their community's traditional lifestyle as they are still engaged in seemingly dying occupations such as fishing, innkeeping and performing traditional Moroccan music.

The film premiered at the 2010 Montreal International Documentary Festival, before going into commercial release in 2011.

== Awards ==
The film won the Grand prix de la Ville de Tétouan for documentary films at the 2011 Festival international de cinéma méditerranéen in Tétouan.

It was a Jutra Award nominee for Best Documentary Film at the 14th Jutra Awards in 2012.
