= Our Private Lives =

- French: Nos Vies privées
- Directed by: Denis Côté
- Written by: Denis Côté
- Produced by: Denis Côté; Daniel Fontaine-Bégin; Rafaël Ouellet
- Starring: Anastassia Liutova; Пенко Господинов
- Cinematography: Rafaël Ouellet
- Edited by: Christian Laurence
- Music by: Ramponneau Paradise
- Production company: Nihilproductions
- Release date: February 15, 2007 (RVCQ)
- Running time: 82 minutes
- Country: Canada
- Languages: Bulgarian; French; English
- Budget: $80,000

Our Private Lives (French: Nos Vies privées) is a Canadian drama film, directed by Denis Côté and released in 2007. The film centres on the relationship between Milena (Anastassia Liutova), a Bulgarian immigrant who has lived in Montreal for a decade, and Phillip (Penko Gospodinov), a photographer from Sofia, when they meet for the first time after several months of corresponding on the Internet.

Côté wrote the screenplay in French, and it was translated into Bulgarian by the actors. He directed the film despite not being fluent in Bulgarian, calling it an experiment in having to rely on other cues, such as vocal tone and body language, to ensure that he was getting the performances he wanted out of the actors.
