= La Ronde (2011 film) =

- Directed by: Sophie Goyette
- Written by: Sophie Goyette
- Produced by: Élaine Hébert
- Starring: Éliane Préfontaine; Hubert Lemire
- Cinematography: François Messier-Rheault
- Edited by: Isabelle Malenfant
- Music by: Éliane Préfonaine
- Distributed by: Christal Films
- Release date: August 6, 2011 (Locarno)
- Running time: 23 minutes
- Country: Canada
- Language: French

La Ronde is a Canadian short drama film, directed by Sophie Goyette and released in 2011. The film stars Éliane Préfontaine and Hubert Lemire as Ariane and Alexandre, twin siblings who are experiencing very different reactions to their father's impending death: Alexandre feels the need to stay close to their father, while Ariane feels the need to leave.

The film premiered at the Locarno Film Festival on August 6, 2011, and had its Canadian premiere at the 2011 Toronto International Film Festival.

The film was named to TIFF's year-end Canada's Top Ten list for 2011, and was a Genie Award nominee for Best Live Action Short Drama at the 32nd Genie Awards.

Goyette's feature film debut, Still Night, Still Light (Mes nuits feront écho), starred Préfontaine in a thematically similar story about a different character.
