= Joy of Man's Desiring (film) =

- Film poster
- French: Que ta joie demeure
- Directed by: Denis Côté
- Written by: Denis Côté
- Produced by: Denis Côté; Sylvain Corbeil; Nancy Grant
- Starring: Guillaume Tremblay; Émilie Sigouin; Hamidou Savadogo; Ted Pluviose; Cassandre Emmanuel; Olivier Aubin
- Cinematography: Jessica Lee Gagné
- Edited by: Nicolas Roy
- Production company: Metafilms
- Distributed by: EyeSteelFilm
- Release date: February 7, 2014 (Berlin)
- Running time: 70 minutes
- Country: Canada
- Language: French

Joy of Man’s Desiring (French: Que ta joie demeure) is a 2014 Canadian experimental film written, directed and produced by Denis Côté. It shows factory work and includes staged monologues by workers. It had its world premiere at the 2014 Berlin International Film Festival and received a Special Jury Mention at FICUNAM.

== Synopsis ==
The film explores people’s relationship with work through a staged depiction of workers interacting with machines and industrial spaces. It combines documentary-style factory scenes with monologues by actors playing workers.

== Cast ==
The cast includes:

- Guillaume Tremblay
- Émilie Sigouin
- Hamidou Savadogo
- Ted Pluviose
- Cassandre Emmanuel
- Olivier Aubin

== Production ==
The film was presented by Metafilms and was written, directed and produced by Denis Côté.

== Release ==
The film had its world premiere at the 2014 Berlin International Film Festival, and its Canadian premiere at the Rendez-vous Québec Cinéma. It was released theatrically in Montreal on April 4, 2014.

== Reception ==
=== Critical response ===
Ronnie Scheib of Variety described the film as an "austere contemplation" of humans and machines at work. Scheib noted its use of "static, strikingly composed documentary stretches" combined with fictional monologues by actors playing workers, and wrote that it was "definitely not for the narrative-minded".

The New York Times described it as "ruminative" and "semi-fictional", writing that Côté observed factory workers "with a documentary eye" while adding dialogue and details that "seem to express the workers’ humanity".

Jesse Cataldo of Slant Magazine wrote that the film treated labour as both "a universal function of life and a spectacle in itself". He described Côté’s approach as combining factory footage with staged discussions, and wrote that the film presented workers as "reduced to babysitters for nearly self-operating machines".

=== Awards ===
At the 2014 FICUNAM in Mexico, the film received a Special Jury Mention.
