= Dodging the Clock =

- French: Horloge biologique
- Directed by: Ricardo Trogi
- Written by: Jean-Philippe Pearson; Patrice Robitaille; Ricardo Trogi
- Produced by: Nicole Robert
- Starring: Patrice Robitaille; Pierre-François Legendre; Jean-Philippe Pearson
- Cinematography: Jean-François Lord
- Edited by: Yvann Thibaudeau
- Music by: Frédéric Bégin; Phil Electric
- Production company: Go Films
- Release date: August 1, 2005
- Running time: 100 minutes
- Country: Canada
- Language: French

Dodging the Clock (French: Horloge biologique, lit. "Biological Clock") is a Canadian comedy-drama film, directed by Ricardo Trogi and released in 2005.

== Plot ==
The film stars Patrice Robitaille, Pierre-François Legendre and Jean-Philippe Pearson as Fred, Paul and Sébastien, three friends who are in various stages of coming to terms with, or rejecting, the urge to settle down and become fathers. Fred is reacting with fear to his girlfriend Marie (Geneviève Alarie) expressing her desire to get pregnant, and secretly slipping contraceptive pills into her daily orange juice to prevent it; Paul is ambivalent about the current pregnancy of his girlfriend Isabelle (Catherine Proulx-Lemay); Sébastien is already a dad, but is chafing at the way the demands of fatherhood conflict with his desire to hang out and do guy things with his friends.

== Critical reception ==
In December 2005, it was named to the Toronto International Film Festival's annual Canada's Top Ten list of the year's best films.
