= Antlers (2007 film) =

2007 Canadian documentary film

- French: Panache
- Directed by: André-Line Beauparlant
- Produced by: Danielle Leblanc
- Cinematography: Robert Morin
- Edited by: Sophie Leblond
- Production companies: Coop Vidéo de Montréal; Les Productions 23 Inc.
- Distributed by: Atopia
- Release date: February 21, 2007 (RVCQ)
- Running time: 90 minutes
- Country: Canada
- Language: French

Antlers (French: Panache) is a Canadian documentary film, directed by André-Line Beauparlant and released in 2009. The film centres on a group of caribou hunters in the rural Montcerf-Lytton area of Quebec.

The film premiered on February 21, 2007 at the Rendez-vous du cinéma québécois.

The film received a Genie Award nomination for Best Feature Length Documentary at the 28th Genie Awards in 2008.
