= Antonello Cozzolino =

Canadian film and television producer

Antonello Cozzolino is a Canadian film and television producer from Quebec. Associated with the Attraction Images studio, he was named president of the Quebec chapter of the Academy of Canadian Cinema and Television in December 2023. He is a graduate of Institut national de l'image et du son (L'inis).

== Filmography ==
=== Film ===
- TV Dinner...Burp! - 2004
- Tuesday Morning...Somewhere (Mardi matin...quelque part) - 2005
- The Rip-Off - 2006
- Je sais - 2007
- Le goût du temps - 2007
- My Name Is Victor Gazon (Mon nom est Victor Gazon) - 2008
- Le Technicien - 2009
- Le soccer dans tous ses états - 2010
- You Are So Undead - 2010
- Trotteur - 2011
- L'autisme, un combat de tous les jours - 2011
- Amsterdam - 2013
- Émilie - 2013
- Nitro Rush - 2016
- Boost - 2016
- Barefoot at Dawn (Pieds nus dans l'aube) - 2017
- Mafia Inc. - 2019
- 14 Days, 12 Nights (14 jours 12 nuits) - 2019
- My Very Own Circus (Mon cirque à moi) - 2024
- Coco Farm (Coco ferme) - 2023
- One Summer (Le temps d'un été) - 2023
- Miss Boots (Mlle Bottine) - 2024
- My Stepmother Is a Witch (Ma belle-mère est une sorcière) - 2025

=== Television ===
- Saint-Élie-de-Légendes - 2015-17
- The Siege (Le Siège) - 2017
- Portrait-Robot - 2021
- Désobéir: le choix de Chantale Daigle - 2023
- Mégantic - 2023

== Awards ==
Award	Date of ceremony	Category	Work	Result	Ref(s)
Gémeaux Awards	2023	Best Dramatic Series	Mégantic with Alexis Durand-Brault, Sophie Lorain, Richard Speer	Nominated	
Genie Awards	2005	Best Live Action Short Drama	TV Dinner...Burp! with Annie Normandin, Vanessa-Tatjana Beerli	Nominated	
Genie Awards	2006	Best Live Action Short Drama	Tuesday Morning...Somewhere (Mardi matin...quelque part) with Hélène Bélanger Martin	Nominated	
Genie Awards	2009	Best Live Action Short Drama	My Name Is Victor Gazon (Mon nom est Victor Gazon) with Patrick Gazé, Marie-Josée Laroque, Annie Normandin	Nominated	
Prix Iris	2020	Best Film	Mafia Inc. with Daniel Grou, Valérie D'Auteuil, André Rouleau	Nominated	
Prix Iris	2020	Prix Public	Mafia Inc. with Daniel Grou, Valérie D'Auteuil, André Rouleau	Nominated	
Prix Iris	2022	Prix Public	The Time Thief (L'arracheuse de temps) with Francis Leclerc, Fred Pellerin	Nominated	
Prix Iris	2023	Prix Public	One Summer (Le temps d'un été) with Patrick Roy, Brigitte Léveillé, Louise Archambault, Marie Vien	Nominated	
