= Alexis Lapointe =

Canadian athlete and folklore character

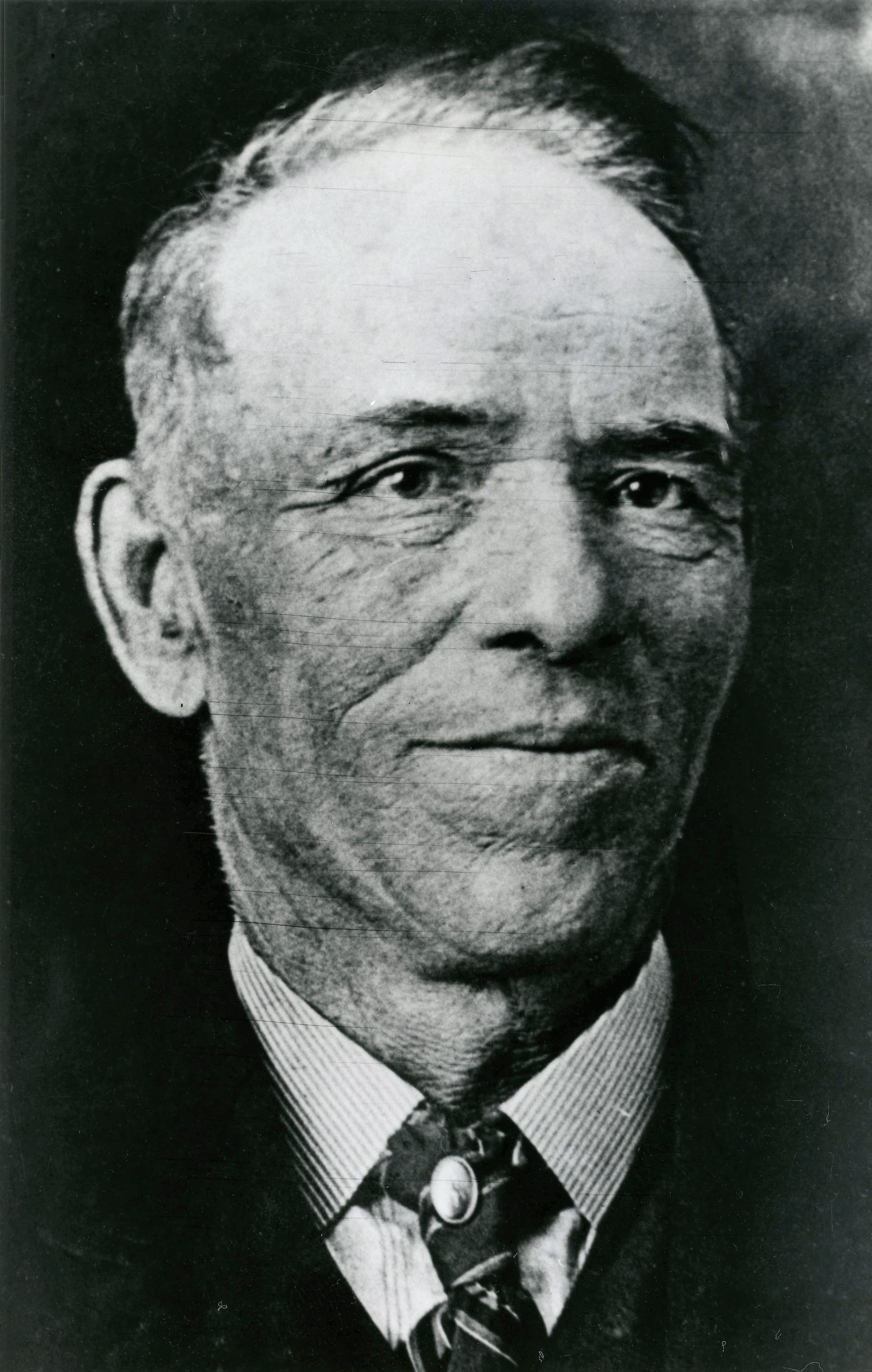
Alexis "le Trotteur" Lapointe in 1920

Alexis Lapointe, known as Alexis le Trotteur (Alexis the Trotter; June 4, 1860 – January 12, 1924) was a Quebec athlete in the early 20th century who has become a legendary character of québécois folklore.

== Biography ==
=== Origins ===
Though the precise identity of the man known as Alexis le Trotteur is the subject of some debate, most historians agree he was in fact Alexis Lapointe, born in 1860 at either Saint-Étienne-de-la-Malbaie or Clermont, in the Charlevoix region, to a family of 14 children. He established himself very early as an eccentric who was persuaded that he was in fact a stallion born in human form. As a child, he built wooden horses to play with. As a teenager, he whipped himself to stimulate his muscles and undertook long trips throughout his native region, like his favourite animal. His family had trouble accepting his eccentricity; Alexis left home at the age of 18 and spent the rest of his life on the road.

== Legendary exploits ==
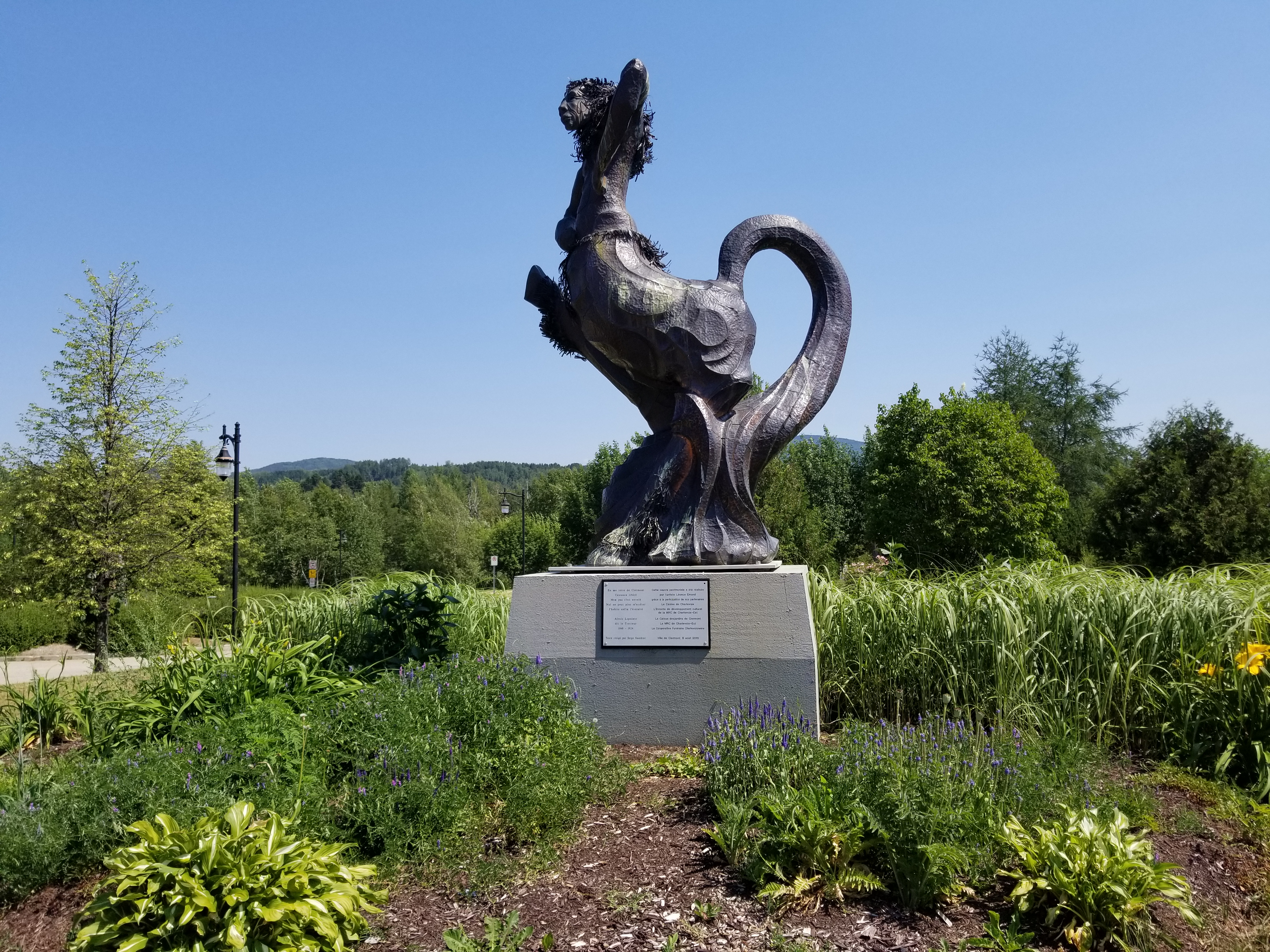
Image of the monument inaugurated on August 18, 2010 in honor of Alexis Lapointe (1860-1924) at Des Berges Municipal Park in Clermont, QC. He was renowned for being one of the greatest runners of his time.

His physical exploits have been so embellished over time that it has become difficult to separate the fact from the fiction. He is said to have raced against several horses, against whom he supposedly always won, including the prize stallion of Seigneur Duggan de La Malbaie. It earned him several nicknames, such as le Centaure (the Centaur), le Surcheval (the Superhorse) and le Cheval du Nord (the Horse of the North).

Author Marius Barbeau describes him as a simpleton, having just enough wit to profit from his strangeness; he became famous in his own way.

Probably the most famous anecdote concerning him tells that one day, he was on the quay of La Malbaie with his father who had to leave by boat to Bagotville at 11 o'clock. According to the legend, his father refused to take him along, so he told him, "When you arrive at Bagotville, I will be there to grab the moorings." Alexis then took a whip to stimulate himself and undertook to run the entire way to Bagotville, that is 146 kilometres (91 mi). Twelve hours later, when the boat docked at Bagotville at 11 o'clock at night, Alexis was on the wharf waiting for his father.

He participated in fairs and competitions where he showed off his physical abilities to make a profit. It was said he could dance all evening and all night without tiring. Races were organized in which Alexis raced against trains and the very first cars to appear in the region (he beat them all, of course.)

Félix-Antoine Savard, an author of the time, also described him as an able woodstove builder.

=== Death ===
Alexis le Trotteur was struck by a train and died while working on the construction site of the Isle-Maligne hydroelectric plant. Opinions vary as to the exact cause of his death. Some believe he tripped while trying to outrace the train; others say that, due to his physical decline, he decided to commit suicide.

One of his co-workers on the site, cited by the historian Serge Gauthier, hinted as much: "I saw him ten years later in Matapédia, where he was only a construction worker like you or I. He was still well spoken of, but like a faded star. They said he could no longer run any faster than a regular horse." (Note: Je l'ai revu dix ans plus tard en Matapédia, où il n'était qu'homme de chantier comme vous et moi. On en parlait bien encore mais comme d'une gloire un peu fanée. Il ne courait plus que comme un moyen cheval, disait-on.) Another man named Jeen Sherman witnessed Alexis racing against a car.

== Legacy ==
=== Remains ===
In 1966 his remains were exhumed from the La Malbaie cemetery by a specialist in physical activity, Jean-Claude Larouche, in order to examine them; he confirmed that a sustained lifelong training had made him into a formidable athlete. His bones were then entrusted to the Musée du Saguenay-Lac-Saint-Jean in Chicoutimi. An exhibition opened in 1999 called "Alexis le Trotteur: Athlete or Centaur?", in which his bones and objects having belonged to him were exhibited.

=== Popular culture ===
The story of Alexis le Trotteur has seen numerous adaptations into stories and novels. The historian Serge Gauthier counted books, movies, names of streets, music records and songs, a ballet, a comic book, a sports festival, etc., all bearing his name.

Between 1979 and 1981 he was depicted in a four-volume comic book series published by Éditions Paulines, with writing by Blaise and artwork by Bos : L'Homme qui courait comme un cheval : Alexis le trotteur (1979), Au trot et au galop : Alexis le trotteur (1979), Alexis le trotteur contre Baba (1981), and Alexis le trotteur: le Pony express (1981).

The Quebec folk music group Mes Aïeux wrote a song about him, entitled Train de vie (le Surcheval), which was released on their album En famille, drawing parallels between the life of Alexis le Trotteur and the frenetic pace of modern living.

Written in first person narrative, Alexis Lapointe is one of several anecdotal portraits of artists and athletes appearing on Seamus Cater & Viljam Nybacka's 2012 album The Anecdotes.

The 2011 short film Trotteur, by Arnaud Brisebois and Francis Leclerc, was inspired in part by Lapointe.

== Sources of French text ==
- Nancy Schmitz (December 16, 2013). "Alexis le Trotteur". The Canadian Encyclopedia (online ed.). Historica Canada.
- (in French) Barbeau, Marius, Le Saguenay légendaire. Montréal : Librairie Beauchemin, 1967.
- (in French) Savard, Félix-Antoine. L'Abatis. Montréal : Fides, 1969.
- (in French) Gauthier, Serge, Le légendaire Alexis Lapointe dit le Trotteur (1860-1924). Mythes et réalités au sujet du Cheval du Nord. Encyclobec, consulté le 5 janvier 2005.
- (in French) Le Phare Été 1999 - Nº 37, consulté le 5 janvier 2005.
- (in French) Gaudreau, Serge, 12 janvier 1924 - Décès d'Alexis Lapointe, dit «le Trotteur», Bilan du siècle, Université de Sherbrooke, visité le 6 janvier 2005.
