= Prix Iris for Best Art Direction =

Annual Canadian film award

The Prix Iris for Best Art Direction (French: Prix Iris de la meilleure direction artistique) is an annual film award presented by Québec Cinéma as part of the Prix Iris awards program, to honour the year's best art direction in the Cinema of Quebec.

Until 2016, it was known as the Jutra Award for Best Art Direction in memory of influential Quebec film director Claude Jutra. Following the withdrawal of Jutra's name from the award, the 2016 award was presented under the name Québec Cinéma. The Prix Iris name was announced in October 2016.

André-Line Beauparlant received the most nominations, eleven, while François Séguin won four awards from four nominations, a rare perfect score.

== 1990s ==
Year	Art director(s)	Film	Ref
1999; 1st Jutra Awards
1999; 1st Jutra Awards	François Séguin, Renée April	The Red Violin (Le violon rouge)	
1999; 1st Jutra Awards	Monique Dion, C. Jacques, Jean Le Bourdais	Nô	
1999; 1st Jutra Awards	Stéphane Roy, Daniel Hamelin, Helen Rainbird	It's Your Turn, Laura Cadieux (C't'à ton tour, Laura Cadieux)	
1999; 1st Jutra Awards	Stéphane Roy, Nicoletta Massone	Kayla	

== 2000s ==
Year	Art director(s)	Film	Ref
2000; 2nd Jutra Awards
2000; 2nd Jutra Awards	Serge Bureau, Michèle Hamel	Set Me Free (Emporte-moi)	
2000; 2nd Jutra Awards	Raymond Dupuis, Suzanne Harel	Laura Cadieux II (Laura Cadieux...la suite)	
2000; 2nd Jutra Awards	Michel Marsolais, Hélène Schneider	Pin-Pon: The Film (Pin-Pon, le film)	
2000; 2nd Jutra Awards	Claude Paré, Renée April	Grey Owl	
2001; 3rd Jutra Awards
2001; 3rd Jutra Awards	Sylvain Gingras, Denis Sperdouklis	Maelström	
2001; 3rd Jutra Awards	Jean Morin	Stardom	
2001; 3rd Jutra Awards	Jean Morin, Pierre Perrault	The Art of War	
2001; 3rd Jutra Awards	Collin Niemi	Possible Worlds	
2002; 4th Jutra Awards
2002; 4th Jutra Awards	Jean-Baptiste Tard	February 15, 1839 (15 février 1839)	
2002; 4th Jutra Awards	André-Line Beauparlant	Marriages (Mariages)	
2002; 4th Jutra Awards	André-Line Beauparlant	The Woman Who Drinks (La femme qui boit)	
2002; 4th Jutra Awards	Mario Hervieux	The Widow of Saint-Pierre (La veuve de Saint-Pierre)	
2003; 5th Jutra Awards
2003; 5th Jutra Awards	Ronald Fauteux, Jean Becotte, Michèle Hamel	Séraphin: Heart of Stone (Séraphin: un homme et son péché)	
2003; 5th Jutra Awards	Monique Dion, Francesca Chamberland	The Marsh (Le marais)	
2003; 5th Jutra Awards	Michel Marsolais, Lyse Bédard	North Station (Station Nord)	
2003; 5th Jutra Awards	Michel Proulx, François Barbeau	Alice's Odyssey (L'odyssée d'Alice Tremblay)	
2004; 6th Jutra Awards
2004; 6th Jutra Awards	Normand Sarazin	The Barbarian Invasions (Les invasions barbares)	
2004; 6th Jutra Awards	Patricia Christie	Mambo Italiano	
2004; 6th Jutra Awards	Jean Le Bourdais	The Far Side of the Moon (La face cachée de la lune)	
2004; 6th Jutra Awards	Normand Sarazin	Seducing Doctor Lewis (La grande séduction)	
2005; 7th Jutra Awards
2005; 7th Jutra Awards	Normand Sarazin	Bittersweet Memories (Ma vie en cinémascope)	
2005; 7th Jutra Awards	Jean Babin	Dans une galaxie près de chez vous	
2005; 7th Jutra Awards	Michel Proulx	Machine Gun Molly (Monica la mitraille)	
2005; 7th Jutra Awards	Jean-Baptiste Tard	Battle of the Brave (Nouvelle-France)	
2006; 8th Jutra Awards
2006; 8th Jutra Awards	Patrice Vermette	C.R.A.Z.Y.	
2006; 8th Jutra Awards	Gilles Aird	The United States of Albert (Les États-Unis d'Albert)	
2006; 8th Jutra Awards	Michel Proulx	The Rocket (Maurice Richard)	
2006; 8th Jutra Awards	Normand Sarazin	The Outlander (Le survenant)	
2007; 9th Jutra Awards
2007; 9th Jutra Awards	André-Line Beauparlant	A Sunday in Kigali (Un dimanche à Kigali)	
2007; 9th Jutra Awards	Jean Bécotte	Bon Cop, Bad Cop	
2007; 9th Jutra Awards	Patrice Bengle	Deliver Me (Délivrez-moi)	
2007; 9th Jutra Awards	François Laplante	Black Eyed Dog	
2008; 10th Jutra Awards
2008; 10th Jutra Awards	François Séguin	Silk	
2008; 10th Jutra Awards	Gilles Aird	The 3 L'il Pigs (Les 3 p'tits cochons)	
2008; 10th Jutra Awards	André-Line Beauparlant	Continental, a Film Without Guns (Continental, un film sans fusil)	
2008; 10th Jutra Awards	David Pelletier	The Ring (Le ring)	
2009; 11th Jutra Awards
2009; 11th Jutra Awards	Nicolas Lepage	Babine	
2009; 11th Jutra Awards	Jean-François Campeau	It's Not Me, I Swear! (C'est pas moi, je le jure!)	
2009; 11th Jutra Awards	Danielle Labrie	The American Trap (Le piège américain)	
2009; 11th Jutra Awards	Michel Marsolais	Dans une galaxie près de chez vous 2	

== 2010s ==
Year	Art director(s)	Film	Ref
2010; 12th Jutra Awards
2010; 12th Jutra Awards	David Pelletier	Through the Mist (Dédé, à travers les brumes)	
2010; 12th Jutra Awards	Jean Babin	The Master Key (Grande Ourse, la clé des possibles)	
2010; 12th Jutra Awards	André-Line Beauparlant	The Timekeeper	
2010; 12th Jutra Awards	Jean Bécotte	Cadavres	
2010; 12th Jutra Awards	Danielle Labrie	Sticky Fingers (Les doigts croches)	
2011; 13th Jutra Awards
2011; 13th Jutra Awards	André-Line Beauparlant	Incendies	
2011; 13th Jutra Awards	Dominique Desrochers	The Comeback (Cabotins)	
2011; 13th Jutra Awards	Claude Paré	Barney's Version	
2011; 13th Jutra Awards	Michel Proulx	The Child Prodigy (L'enfant prodige)	
2011; 13th Jutra Awards	Patrice Vermette	City of Shadows (La cité)	
2012; 14th Jutra Awards
2012; 14th Jutra Awards	Patrice Vermette	Café de Flore	
2012; 14th Jutra Awards	Patrice Bengle	Coteau rouge	
2012; 14th Jutra Awards	Marie-Ève Bolduc	Snow and Ashes	
2012; 14th Jutra Awards	Danielle Labrie	Starbuck	
2012; 14th Jutra Awards	Normand Sarazin	For the Love of God (Pour l'amour de Dieu)	
2013; 15th Jutra Awards
2013; 15th Jutra Awards	Anne Pritchard	Laurence Anyways	
2013; 15th Jutra Awards	Éric Barbeau	The Torrent (Le torrent)	
2013; 15th Jutra Awards	André-Line Beauparlant	Inch'Allah	
2013; 15th Jutra Awards	André Guimond	L'Affaire Dumont	
2013; 15th Jutra Awards	François Schuiten, Patrick Sioui, Martin Tessier, Élisabeth Williams	Mars and April (Mars et Avril)	
2014; 16th Jutra Awards
2014; 16th Jutra Awards	Michel Proulx, Marc Ricard	Louis Cyr (Louis Cyr: L'homme le plus fort du monde)	
2014; 16th Jutra Awards	Jean Babin, Christian Légaré, David Pelletier	Triptych (Triptyque)	
2014; 16th Jutra Awards	Isabelle Guay, Jean-Pierre Paquet, Réal Proulx	Upside Down	
2014; 16th Jutra Awards	Marie-Hélène Lavoie	Hunting the Northern Godard (La chasse au Godard d'Abbittibbi)	
2014; 16th Jutra Awards	Marjorie Rhéaume	Diego Star	
2015; 17th Jutra Awards
2015; 17th Jutra Awards	Patrice Vermette	1987	
2015; 17th Jutra Awards	Marie-Claude Gosselin	Henri Henri	
2015; 17th Jutra Awards	Guy Lalande	The Grand Seduction	
2015; 17th Jutra Awards	Colombe Raby	Mommy	
2015; 17th Jutra Awards	Patrice Vermette	Enemy	
2016; 18th Quebec Cinema Awards
2016; 18th Quebec Cinema Awards	François Séguin	Brooklyn	
2016; 18th Quebec Cinema Awards	Philippe Arseneau Bussières	Snowtime! (La guerre des tuques 3D)	
2016; 18th Quebec Cinema Awards	Éric Barbeau	Corbo	
2016; 18th Quebec Cinema Awards	Éric Barbeau	Our Loved Ones (Les êtres chers)	
2016; 18th Quebec Cinema Awards	Patrice Bengle	The Passion of Augustine (La passion d'Augustine)	
2017; 19th Quebec Cinema Awards
2017; 19th Quebec Cinema Awards	Éric Barbeau	Those Who Make Revolution Halfway Only Dig Their Own Graves (Ceux qui font les révolutions à moitié n'ont fait que se creuser un tombeau)	
2017; 19th Quebec Cinema Awards	Jean Babin	Wild Run: The Legend (Chasse-Galerie: La légende)	
2017; 19th Quebec Cinema Awards	Patrice Bengle	Kiss Me Like a Lover (Embrasse-moi comme tu m'aimes)	
2017; 19th Quebec Cinema Awards	David Brisbin, Isabelle Guay, Jean-Pierre Paquet	Race	
2017; 19th Quebec Cinema Awards	Dominique Desrochers	Nitro Rush	
2018; 20th Quebec Cinema Awards
2018; 20th Quebec Cinema Awards	Francois Séguin	Hochelaga, Land of Souls (Hochelaga, terre des âmes)	
2018; 20th Quebec Cinema Awards	André-Line Beauparlant	Infiltration (Le problème d'infiltration)	
2018; 20th Quebec Cinema Awards	Guillaume Couture	Cross My Heart (Les rois mongols)	
2018; 20th Quebec Cinema Awards	Jean-Marc Renaud	We Are the Others (Nous sommes les autres)	
2018; 20th Quebec Cinema Awards	Marjorie Rhéaume	The Little Girl Who Was Too Fond of Matches (La petite fille qui aimait trop les allumettes)	
2019; 21st Quebec Cinema Awards
2019; 21st Quebec Cinema Awards	Raymond Dupuis	La Bolduc	
2019; 21st Quebec Cinema Awards	Sylvain Dion, Patricia McNeil	The Great Darkened Days (La grande noirceur)	
2019; 21st Quebec Cinema Awards	Marie-Pier Fortier	Ghost Town Anthology (Répertoire des villes disparues)	
2019; 21st Quebec Cinema Awards	Marie-Claude Gosselin	For Those Who Don't Read Me (À tous ceux qui ne me lisent pas)	
2019; 21st Quebec Cinema Awards	Christian Legaré	1991	

== 2020s ==
Year	Art director(s)	Film	Ref
2020; 22nd Quebec Cinema Awards
2020; 22nd Quebec Cinema Awards	Dany Boivin	The Twentieth Century	
2020; 22nd Quebec Cinema Awards	Éric Barbeau	A Brother's Love (La femme de mon frère)	
2020; 22nd Quebec Cinema Awards	Marie-Claude Gosselin, Jean Lebourdais	And the Birds Rained Down (Il pleuvait des oiseaux)	
2020; 22nd Quebec Cinema Awards	Sylvain Lemaitre	Young Juliette (Jeune Juliette)	
2020; 22nd Quebec Cinema Awards	David Pelletier	Mafia Inc.	
2021; 23rd Quebec Cinema Awards
2021; 23rd Quebec Cinema Awards	Patrice Bengle, Louise Tremblay	The Vinland Club (Le club Vinland)	
2021; 23rd Quebec Cinema Awards	Élise de Blois, Claude Tremblay	My Salinger Year	
2021; 23rd Quebec Cinema Awards	Sylvain Lemaitre, Louisa Schabas	Blood Quantum	
2021; 23rd Quebec Cinema Awards	David Pelletier	My Very Own Circus (Mon cirque à moi)	
2021; 23rd Quebec Cinema Awards	David Pelletier	Target Number One	
2022; 24th Quebec Cinema Awards
2022; 24th Quebec Cinema Awards	Arnaud Brisebois, Jean Babin, Ève Turcotte	The Time Thief (L'arracheuse de temps)	
2022; 24th Quebec Cinema Awards	Éric Barbeau	The Monarch (La contemplation du mystère)	
2022; 24th Quebec Cinema Awards	André-Line Beauparlant	Drunken Birds (Les oiseaux ivres)	
2022; 24th Quebec Cinema Awards	Jean Babin	Maria Chapdelaine	
2022; 24th Quebec Cinema Awards	Louisa Schabas	Bootlegger	
2023; 25th Quebec Cinema Awards
2023; 25th Quebec Cinema Awards	André-Line Beauparlant	Viking	
2023; 25th Quebec Cinema Awards	Sylvie Desmarais	Bungalow	
2023; 25th Quebec Cinema Awards	Mathieu Lemay	The Dishwasher (Le Plongeur)	
2023; 25th Quebec Cinema Awards	Laura Nhem	Red Rooms (Les Chambres rouges)	
2023; 25th Quebec Cinema Awards	Colombe Raby	Babysitter	
2024; 26th Quebec Cinema Awards
2024; 26th Quebec Cinema Awards	Ludovic Dufresne	Humanist Vampire Seeking Consenting Suicidal Person (Vampire humaniste cherche suicidaire consentant)	
2024; 26th Quebec Cinema Awards	Jean Babin	Ababooned (Ababouiné)	
2024; 26th Quebec Cinema Awards	Marie-Hélène Lavoie	Ru	
2024; 26th Quebec Cinema Awards	Colombe Raby	The Nature of Love (Simple comme Sylvain)	
2024; 26th Quebec Cinema Awards	Yola Van Leeuwenkamp	Tell Me Why These Things Are So Beautiful (Dis-moi pourquoi ces choses sont si belles)	
2025; 27th Quebec Cinema Awards
2025; 27th Quebec Cinema Awards	Louisa Schabas	Universal Language (Une langue universelle)	
2025; 27th Quebec Cinema Awards	André-Line Beauparlant	Shepherds (Bergers)	
2025; 27th Quebec Cinema Awards	Ludovic Dufresne	Vile & Miserable (Vil & Misérable)	
2025; 27th Quebec Cinema Awards	Sylvain Lemaitre	Peak Everything (Amour apocalypse)	
2025; 27th Quebec Cinema Awards	Louisa Schabas	Two Women (Deux femmes en or)	

== Multiple wins and nominations ==
=== Multiple wins ===
Wins	Art director
4	François Séguin
3	André-Line Beauparlant
3	Patrice Vermette
2	Michèle Hamel
2	Normand Sarazin

=== Three or more nominations ===
Nominations	Art director
11	André-Line Beauparlant
7	Jean Babin
6	Éric Barbeau
6	David Pelletier
5	Patrice Bengle
5	Michel Proulx
5	Normand Sarazin
5	Patrice Vermette
4	Louisa Schabas
4	François Séguin
3	Jean Bécotte
3	Marie-Claude Gosselin
3	Jean Le Bourdais
3	Danielle Labrie
3	Sylvain Lemaitre
3	Michel Marsolais
3	Colombe Raby

== See also ==
- Canadian Screen Award for Best Art Direction/Production Design
