= A Girl at the Window =

2001 film by Francis Leclerc

- French: Une jeune fille à la fenêtre
- Directed by: Francis Leclerc
- Written by: Marcel Beaulieu; Francis Leclerc
- Produced by: Barbara Shrier
- Starring: Fanny Mallette; Hugues Frenette; Denis Bernard
- Cinematography: Steve Asselin
- Edited by: Glenn Berman
- Music by: Pierre Duchesne
- Production company: Palomar
- Distributed by: Alliance Atlantis
- Release date: August 30, 2001 (MWFF)
- Running time: 90 minutes
- Country: Canada
- Language: French

A Girl at the Window (French: Une jeune fille à la fenêtre) is a Canadian drama film, directed by Francis Leclerc and released in 2001. The film stars Fanny Mallette as Marthe, a young woman living in Quebec City in the 1920s; afflicted with an incurable heart condition which will eventually kill her, she is ostensibly in Quebec City to study classical piano, but decides to live for the moment and get more enjoyment out of the time she has after being exposed to the city's jazz nightclubs.

The film's cast also includes Hugues Frenette, Denis Bernard, Évelyne Rompré, Johanne-Marie Tremblay and Diane Dufresne.

Leclerc wrote the screenplay based loosely on his own sister, who herself died of a heart condition at a young age. The film was shot in 2000, and premiered at the 2001 Montreal World Film Festival.

The film received three Genie Award nominations at the 22nd Genie Awards in 2002, for Best Overall Sound (Dominique Chartrand, Luc Boudrias, Bernard Gariépy Strobl, Hans Peter Strobl), Best Sound Editing (Marcel Pothier, Guy Francoeur, Carole Gagnon, Dominik Pagacz, Jacques Plante) and Best Original Score (Pierre Duchesne). Mallette received a Prix Jutra nomination for Best Actress at the 4th Jutra Awards.
