= Prix Iris for Best Visual Effects =

Annual Canadian film award

The Prix Iris for Best Visual Effects (French: Prix Iris des meilleurs effets visuels) is an annual film award, presented by Québec Cinéma as part of its Prix Iris awards program, to honour the year's best visual effects in films made within the Cinema of Quebec.

The award was presented for the first time at the 19th Quebec Cinema Awards in 2017.

Marie-Claude Lafontaine holds the records for most nominations, with eleven, and most wins, with four. She is the only person to win the same award in four consecutive years. Additionally, Lafontaine was nominated for every film in the category in 2022, assuring her of a win, the only time this occurred in any category.

== 2010s ==
Year	Technicians	Film	Ref
2017; 19th Quebec Cinema Awards
2017; 19th Quebec Cinema Awards	Jean-Pierre Boies, Mathieu Jolicoeur, Jean-François Talbot	King Dave	
2017; 19th Quebec Cinema Awards	Marc Hall	The Cyclotron (Le Cyclotron)	
2017; 19th Quebec Cinema Awards	Martin Lipmann, Cynthia Mourou, Benoît Touchette	Race	
2017; 19th Quebec Cinema Awards	Daniel Lavoie, André Montambeault, Laurent Spillemaecker	Two Lovers and a Bear	
2017; 19th Quebec Cinema Awards	John Tate	Kiss Me Like a Lover (Embrasse-moi comme tu m'aimes)	
2018; 20th Quebec Cinema Awards
2018; 20th Quebec Cinema Awards	Jean-François Ferland	Ravenous (Les Affamés)	
2018; 20th Quebec Cinema Awards	Jean-François Ferland, Marie-Claude Lafontaine	Barefoot at Dawn (Pieds nus dans l'aube)	
2018; 20th Quebec Cinema Awards	Jean-François Ferland, Olivier Péloquin, Simon Harrisson	Infiltration (Le problème d'infiltration)	
2018; 20th Quebec Cinema Awards	Alain Lachance	Hochelaga, Land of Souls (Hochelaga, terre des âmes)	
2018; 20th Quebec Cinema Awards	Jonathan Piché Delorme, Alexandra Vaillancourt	We Are the Others (Nous sommes les autres)	
2019; 21st Quebec Cinema Awards
2019; 21st Quebec Cinema Awards	Aurélia Abate, Delphine Lasserre, Bruno Maillard, Benoît Brière, Louis-Philippe Clavet, Valérie Garcia, Étienne Rodrigue	Just a Breath Away (Dans la brume)	
2019; 21st Quebec Cinema Awards	Jean-Pierre Boies, Jean-François Talbot	1991	
2019; 21st Quebec Cinema Awards	Jean-François Ferland, Marie-Claude Lafontaine	La Bolduc	

== 2020s ==
Year	Technicians	Film	Ref
2020; 22nd Quebec Cinema Awards
2020; 22nd Quebec Cinema Awards	Benoît Brière, Louis-Philippe Clavet, Kinga Sabela	Sympathy for the Devil (Sympathie pour le diable)	
2020; 22nd Quebec Cinema Awards	Véronique Dessard, Philippe Frère	The Hummingbird Project	
2020; 22nd Quebec Cinema Awards	Alain Lachance, Jean-Pierre Riverin	The Song of Names	
2021; 23rd Quebec Cinema Awards
2021; 23rd Quebec Cinema Awards	Sébastien Chartier, Jean-François Ferland, Marie-Claude Lafontaine	The Decline (Jusqu'au déclin)	
2021; 23rd Quebec Cinema Awards	Michael Beaulac, Marie-Hélène Panisset	Target Number One	
2021; 23rd Quebec Cinema Awards	Barbara Rosenstein, Josh Sherrett	Blood Quantum	
2022; 24th Quebec Cinema Awards
2022; 24th Quebec Cinema Awards	Alain Lachance, Loïc Laurelut, Éric Clément, Marie-Claude Lafontaine	The Time Thief (L'arracheuse de temps)	
2022; 24th Quebec Cinema Awards	Jean-François Ferland, Marie-Claude Lafontaine	Maria Chapdelaine	
2022; 24th Quebec Cinema Awards	Maxime Lapointe, Marie-Claude Lafontaine	Goodbye Happiness (Au revoir le bonheur)	
2023; 25th Quebec Cinema Awards
2023; 25th Quebec Cinema Awards	Marie-Claude Lafontaine, Simon Beaupré	Viking	
2023; 25th Quebec Cinema Awards	Marc Hall	Babysitter	
2023; 25th Quebec Cinema Awards	Marc Hall, Alex GD	Farador	
2023; 25th Quebec Cinema Awards	Marc Hall	Victoire (La Cordonnière)	
2023; 25th Quebec Cinema Awards	Mathilde Vézina-Bouchard	Mistral Spatial	
2024; 26th Quebec Cinema Awards
2024; 26th Quebec Cinema Awards	Marie-Claude Lafontaine, Jean-François Ferland, Simon Beaupré	Humanist Vampire Seeking Consenting Suicidal Person (Vampire humaniste cherche suicidaire consentant)	
2024; 26th Quebec Cinema Awards	Julia Aubry, Evren Boisjoli, Ricardo Santillana, René Allegretti	Hunting Daze (Jour de chasse)	
2024; 26th Quebec Cinema Awards	Marie-Josée Huot, Alain Lachance	Ababooned (Ababouiné)	
2024; 26th Quebec Cinema Awards	Marie-Claude Lafontaine, Jean-François Ferland, Sébastien Chartier	Sisters and Neighbors! (Nos belles-sœurs)	
2024; 26th Quebec Cinema Awards	Marie-Claude Lafontaine, Sébastien Chartier	1995	
2025; 27th Quebec Cinema Awards
2025; 27th Quebec Cinema Awards	Olivier Masson	Peak Everything (Amour apocalypse)	
2025; 27th Quebec Cinema Awards	Jean-François « Jafaz » Ferland, Marie-Claude Lafontaine, Marc Morissette	Shepherds (Bergers)	
2025; 27th Quebec Cinema Awards	Marc Hall, David Atexide	Vile & Miserable (Vil & Misérable)	
2025; 27th Quebec Cinema Awards	Sam Javanrouh	Universal Language (Une langue universelle)	
2025; 27th Quebec Cinema Awards	François Trudel, Cynthia Mourou	You Are Not Alone (Vous n'êtes pas seuls)	

== Multiple wins and nominations ==
=== Multiple wins ===
Wins	Technician
4	Marie-Claude Lafontaine
3	Jean-François Ferland
2	Simon Beaupré
2	Benoît Brière
2	Louis-Philippe Clavet

=== Three or more nominations ===
Nominations	Technician
11	Marie-Claude Lafontaine
9	Jean-François Ferland
5	Marc Hall
4	Alain Lachance
3	Sébastien Chartier

== See also ==
- Canadian Screen Award for Best Visual Effects
