= Mafia Inc. =

2019 gangster film directed by Daniel Grou

- Theatrical release poster
- Directed by: Daniel "Podz" Grou
- Written by: Sylvain Guy
- Based on: Mafia Inc: The Long, Bloody Reign of Canada's Sicilian Clan (2011 book) by André Cédilot; André Noël
- Produced by: Antonello Cozzolino; Valérie d'Auteuil; André Rouleau
- Starring: Sergio Castellitto; Marc-André Grondin; Gilbert Sicotte; Mylène Mackay; Donny Falsetti; Tony Nardi; Cristina Rosato; Michael Ricci; Vittorio Rossi; Domenic Di Rosa; Toni Ellwand; John Griffin; Henri Picard
- Cinematography: Steve Cosens
- Edited by: Valérie Héroux
- Music by: Milk & Bone; Joseph Marchand
- Production company: Attraction Images
- Distributed by: Les Films Séville
- Release dates: 25 October 2019 (Mostra); 14 February 2020 (Canada)
- Running time: 143 minutes
- Country: Canada
- Language: French; English; Italian; Sicilian
- Budget: $8.5 million
- Box office: $889,863

Mafia Inc. is a 2019 Canadian gangster film directed by Daniel "Podz" Grou from a screenplay by Sylvain Guy, starring Sergio Castellitto and Marc-André Grondin. Set in 1994, the film follows Vincent Gamache (Grondin), a soldato in the Montreal crime family of Frank Paternò (Castellitto). It is inspired by the 2011 non-fiction book by André Cédilot and André Noël, about Montreal's Rizzuto family.

The film premiered in October 2019 at the São Paulo International Film Festival, before having its Canadian premiere in February 2020. It received positive reviews from critics. Grondin was nominated for Best Actor at the 8th Canadian Screen Awards.

== Plot summary ==
The Gamache, an Italian Canadian family of tailors, have been dressing the Paternò Mafia family for three generations. As a teenager, Vincent “Vince” Gamache chooses instead to work with the Paternò family, and Frank, the godfather, puts him to work with his eldest son, Giaco. Vince, reckless and rash, seeks to earn his stripes by impressing the godfather. Working independently, Vince successfully plans and executes a big operation for the family and is promoted.

Fuming with jealousy, Giaco discovers that Vince committed a monstrous act behind his back. This happens while Frank has the opportunity to get out of the family business by investing $180 million in the construction of a toll bridge linking Sicily to Italy. The Paterno family disown him and war begins.

== Cast ==
- Sergio Castellitto as Francesco "Frank" Paternò
- Marc-André Grondin as Vincent "Vince" Gamache
  - Henri Picard as young Vince
- Gilbert Sicotte as Henri Gamache
- Mylène Mackay as Sofie Gamache
  - Lauranne Ouellette as young Sofie
- Donny Falsetti as Giacomo "Giaco" Paternò Jr.
  - Marco Marinaro as young Giaco
- Vittorio Rossi as Ricardo Galati
- Gerry Mendicino as Giacomo Paternò Sr.
- Michael Ricci as Patrizio Paternò
- Domenic Di Rosa as Donato “Toto” Russo
- Luigi Saracino as Roberto “Birdie” Russo
- Tony Nardi as Domenico “Zizi” Zippo
- Antonio Iammatteo as Tommaso "Tommy Yap-Yap" Volpi
- Rafael Petardi as RCMP Sgt-Maj Claudio Zaccardi
- Benz Antoine as RCMP Sgt Brassens Paul
- Karl Farah as RCMP Cpl Pierre Marois
- Roman Pagliaro as RCMP Cpl Mario Puglisi
- Toni Ellwand as Anna Paternò
- David Calderisi as Gerlando Zecco
- Goûchy Boy as Toussaint Leprince
- Fernand Patry as Reg Bouchard
- Mark Day as Billy McMahon
- John Griffin as Rusty McMahon
- Alain Zouvi as Caleb Xenakis
- Louis-Georges Girard as Deputy Justice Minister Antoine Dion
- Alessandro Izzi as Bino Giacalone
- Cristina Rosato as Vicky Di Renzi
- Guy Thauvette as Judge
- Nick Skokos as Salvatore Scarpa
- Pina Di Blasi as Catarina Paternò
- Stéphane Crête as Gilles
- Geneviève Rochette as Paola Gamache
- Ali Hassan as Ravindu Ranasinghe (uncredited)

== Production ==
Director Daniel Grou was attracted to the project due to his own upbringing in Montreal. "Montreal is bigger than anything — bigger than New York. There’s something about the old-school ways Sicilian families run their business that was really appealing to me, especially when it clashes with Québécois culture..... When I was a kid, a prison bus was shot up in my neighbourhood. I remember when the jeep exploded in Hochelaga and that little boy died. There was a social anxiety around that."

In February 2018 the Quebecor Fund granted $380,000 to support the production of Mafia Inc. and Antigone by Sophie Deraspe (to be divided between the two films). In May 2018 Telefilm Canada announced it would spend approximately $13 million to fund 10 Quebec films, including Mafia Inc. Principal photography took place in Montreal and then Cuba before completing late in 2018.

== Reception ==
=== Critical response ===
Review aggregator website, Rotten Tomatoes reports that 94% of 16 reviews of the film were positive, with an average rating of 6.8/10. According to Metacritic, which sampled six critics and calculated a weighted average score of 64 out of 100, the film received "generally favorable reviews".

=== Accolades ===
Award	Date of ceremony	Category	Recipient(s)	Result	Ref(s)
Canadian Screen Awards	28 May 2020	Best Actor	Marc-André Grondin	Nominated	
Directors Guild of Canada	27 October 2020	Best Production Design – Feature Film	David Pelletier	Nominated	
Prix collégial du cinéma québécois	2021	Best Film	Mafia Inc.	Nominated	
Prix Iris	10 June 2020	Best Film	Antonello Cozzolino, Valérie D’Auteuil, André Rouleau	Nominated	
Prix Iris	10 June 2020	Best Actor	Marc-André Grondin	Nominated	
Prix Iris	10 June 2020	Best Supporting Actor	Sergio Castellitto	Won	
Prix Iris	10 June 2020	Best Art Direction	David Pelletier	Nominated	
Prix Iris	10 June 2020	Best Sound	Luc Boudrias, Sylvain Brassard, Jean Camden	Nominated	
Prix Iris	10 June 2020	Best Costume Design	Valérie Lévesque	Nominated	
Prix Iris	10 June 2020	Best Makeup	Marlène Rouleau, Bruno Gatien	Nominated	
Prix Iris	10 June 2020	Best Hairstyling	Stéphanie Deflandre	Nominated	
Prix Iris	10 June 2020	Best Casting	Nathalie Boutrie, Francis Cantin, Bruno Rosato	Nominated	
Prix Iris	10 June 2020	Public Prize		Nominated	
