= Sylvain Lemaitre =

Sylvain Lemaitre is a Canadian art director production designer. He is most noted for his work on the 2020 film Blood Quantum, for which he and Louisa Schabas won the Canadian Screen Award for Best Art Direction or Production Design at the 9th Canadian Screen Awards, and were nominees for the Prix Iris for Best Art Direction at the 23rd Quebec Cinema Awards.

He was previously a Prix Iris nominee at the 22nd Quebec Cinema Awards for Young Juliette (Jeune Juliette).

His other credits have included the films Love in the Time of Civil War (L'amour au temps de la guerre civile), Turbo Kid and Thanks for Everything (Merci pour tout).
