= Looking for Alexander =

- French: Mémoires affectives
- Directed by: Francis Leclerc
- Written by: Marcel Beaulieu; Francis Leclerc
- Produced by: Barbara Shrier
- Starring: Roy Dupuis
- Cinematography: Steve Asselin
- Edited by: Glenn Berman
- Music by: Pierre Duchesne
- Distributed by: Alliance Atlantis Vivafilm
- Release date: October 29, 2004
- Running time: 100 minutes
- Country: Canada
- Language: French

Looking for Alexander (French: Mémoires affectives) is a Canadian drama film. It was directed and written by Francis Leclerc. Marcel Beaulieu also wrote the script.

== Plot summary ==
Thought to be clinically dead, Alexander (Roy Dupuis) suddenly awakes from a long coma. He recognizes nobody and remembers nothing. As Alexander tries to piece together his life, the mystery deepens. Director Francis Leclerc holds together this precious tale with poetic imagery and strong visuals, all the while teasing the viewer to discover the truth.

== Awards ==
- Genie Awards for Director, Screenplay, Actor (Roy Dupuis)
- Prix Jutra for Film, Director, Actor (Roy Dupuis), Editing

== Cast ==
- Roy Dupuis as Alexandre Tourneur
- Guy Thauvette as Joseph
- Line Rodier as Jeune infirmière
- Maka Kotto as Docteur Ba Kobhio
- Nathalie Coupal as Michelle Tourneur
- Stéphane Archambault as François
- Martin Héroux as Détective Jobin
- Johanne-Marie Tremblay as Infirmière
- Karine Lagueux as Sylvaine Tourneur
- Robert Lalonde as Agent Drolet
- Rosa Zacharie as Pauline Maksoud
- Francis Martineau as Physiothérapeute
- Maxime Dumontier as Joseph jeune
- Alexandre Harvey-Cormier as Alexandre jeune
- Jean-François Gaudet as Père Noël
- France Parent as Brigitte, serveuse bar salon
