= Domenic Di Rosa =

Canadian actor

- Born: February 1, 1979 (age 47); Montreal, Quebec, Canada
- Occupation: Actor
- Years active: 1998–present
- Height: 178 cm (5 ft 10 in)

Domenic Di Rosa (born February 1, 1979) is a Canadian actor. His credits include the television series Big Wolf on Campus, Are You Afraid of the Dark, The Truth About the Harry Quebert Affair and Crave's hit comedy Letterkenny. Most recently he played Father Gabriel in National Geographic's limited series, Barkskins. He also played a supporting role in the Canadian crime drama, Mafia Inc., Pieces of a Woman, Most Wanted and now the latest installment of the Transformers series, Transformers: Rise of the Beasts.

== Personal ==
Di Rosa was born and raised in Montréal's east end from a Sicilian mother and French-Canadian father. He is married and has 4 children.

== Filmography ==
=== Film ===
Year	Title	Role	Notes
2000	Stardom	Security Guard	
2007	End of the Line	Orderly #1	
2019	Good Sam	Man	Uncredited
2019	Mafia Inc.	Donato “Toto” Russo	Also consultant
2020	Most Wanted	Johnny	Uncredited
2020	Pieces of a Woman	Medical Examiner/Dr. Ron	
2021	Peace by Chocolate	Cole	
2023	Transformers: Rise of the Beasts	Bus Driver	
2023	Dream Scenario	Fontane	
2025	Old Guys in Bed	Doug	
2026	The Parking Spot (La Place)	Tow Truck Driver	

=== Television ===
Year	Title	Role	Notes
1999	Are You Afraid of the Dark?	Moose	Episode: "Tale of the Secret Admirer"
1999–2002	Big Wolf on Campus	Tim Eckert	36 episodes
2002	Le Dernier Chapitre	Vasquez Bodyguard	6 episodes
2013	A Stranger in my Home	Detective David Clarke	1 episodes
2018	The Truth About the Harry Quebert Affair	Raul (motel clerk)	1 episode
2018	The Detectives	Bruce	1 episode
2017-2019	Letterkenny	Jean-Pierre	3 episodes
2020	Fatal Vows	Bron	1 episode
2020	Barkskins	Father Gabriel	6 episodes
2020	Faits divers	El Gallo	6 episodes
2021	Patrick Senécal Presente	Client/Delivery Guy	1 episode
2021	District 31	Enzo Mancini	3 episodes
2021	Ghosts	TV Installer Steve	1 episode
2022	Alertes	Paolo De La Cruz	1 episode
2022	Chouchou	Hussier François Sansregrets	1 episode
2023	Plan B	Cedric	1 episode
2023	Avant le crash	Benoit	3 episodes
2023	Reacher	Anthony Russo	1 episode
2024	Portrait-Robot or The Sketch Artist	Michael Lynch	5 episodes
2025	Indéfendables	Garry Bédard	2 episodes
