= David Pelletier (disambiguation) =

David Pelletier may refer to:

- David Pelletier, Canadian pairs figure skater
- David Pelletier (American figure skater)
- David Pelletier (art director), recognized in the Prix Iris for Best Art Direction, among other awards
