= Louisa Schabas =

Canadian production designer

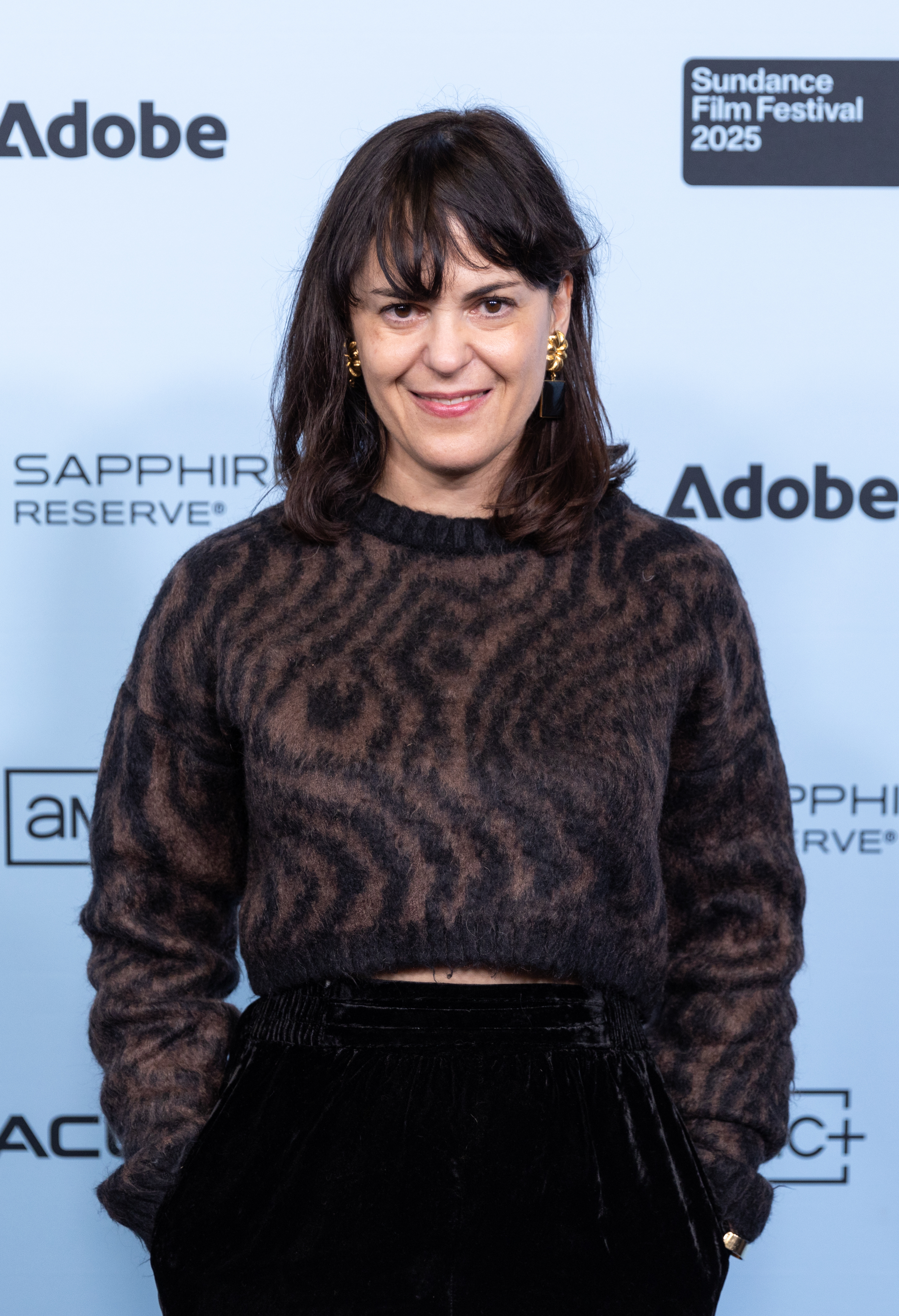
Schabas in 2025

Louisa Schabas is a Canadian production designer. She is most noted for her work on the 2020 film Blood Quantum, for which she and Sylvain Lemaitre won the Canadian Screen Award for Best Art Direction or Production Design at the 9th Canadian Screen Awards, and were nominees for the Prix Iris for Best Art Direction at the 23rd Quebec Cinema Awards.

She was previously a CSA nominee in the same category at the 4th Canadian Screen Awards in 2016 for her work on Felix and Meira.

Her other credits have included the films Mynarski Death Plummet, The Saver, Boris Without Béatrice, Shambles (Maudite poutine), Touched and Fubar Age of Computer.
