= Guillaume Cyr =

Canadian actor

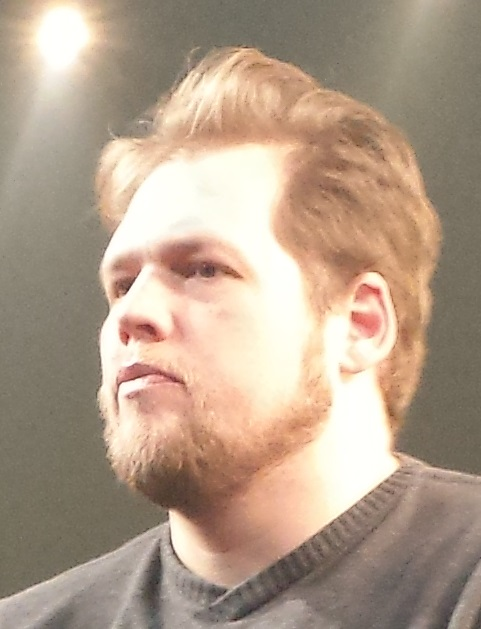
- Born: February 27, 1982 (age 44); Sainte-Marie, Quebec
- Occupation: actor
- Years active: 2000s-present
- Known for: Louis Cyr, The New Life of Paul Sneijder, The Time Thief

Guillaume Cyr (born February 27, 1982) is a Canadian actor from Quebec. He is most noted for his performance as Horace Barré in the 2013 film Louis Cyr (Louis Cyr, l'homme le plus fort du monde), for which he won the Jutra Award for Best Supporting Actor at the 16th Jutra Awards in 2014.

He has been a nominee in the same category on two other occasions, at the 19th Quebec Cinema Awards for The New Life of Paul Sneijder (La nouvelle vie de Paul Sneijder) and at the 24th Quebec Cinema Awards in 2022 for The Time Thief (L'Arracheuse de temps), and a Best Actor nominee at the 25th Quebec Cinema Awards in 2023 for Family Game (Arsenault et fils).

Originally from Sainte-Marie, Quebec, he is a graduate of the National Theatre School of Canada.

His other roles have included the films Babine, Wetlands (Marécages), Laurentia (Laurentie), Small Blind (La mise à l'aveugle), Miraculum, The Decline (Jusqu'au déclin), Bungalow, Lucy Grizzli Sophie, Sisters and Neighbors! (Nos belles-sœurs) and You Will Be Free (Ma fille tu seras libre), and the television series Le berceau des anges, Fatale-Station, Les Beaux malaises, GAME(R), Epidemic, Léo and La Confrèrie.
