= The Passion of Augustine =

- Film poster
- French: La passion d'Augustine
- Directed by: Léa Pool
- Written by: Léa Pool; Marie Vien
- Produced by: Lyse Lafontaine; François Tremblay
- Starring: Céline Bonnier; Lysandre Ménard; Diane Lavallée; Valérie Blais; Pierrette Robitaille; Marie Tifo; Marie-France Lambert; Andrée Lachapelle; Maude Guérin; Élizabeth Tremblay-Gagnon; Yogane Lacombe; Tiffany Montambault; Anne-Élisabeth Bossé; Danielle Fichaud; Gilbert Sicotte
- Cinematography: Daniel Jobin
- Edited by: Michel Arcand
- Music by: François Dompierre
- Production company: Lyla Films
- Release date: March 20, 2015 (Canada)
- Running time: 103 minutes
- Country: Canada
- Language: French
- Budget: C$4.7 million

The Passion of Augustine (French: La passion d'Augustine) is a 2015 Canadian drama film from Quebec directed by Léa Pool and written by Pool and Marie Vien. It stars Céline Bonnier as the head of a rural Quebec convent music school threatened by 1960s educational reforms. The film won six Quebec Cinema Awards, including Best Film, Best Director for Pool and Best Actress for Bonnier, and received two Canadian Screen Award nominations.

== Synopsis ==
In rural Quebec in the 1960s, Mother Augustine is a Catholic nun who teaches music at a convent school. During the period of Vatican II and Quebec's Quiet Revolution, the local government threatens to close the school and replace it with public education. Augustine’s efforts to save the school are complicated by the arrival of her rebellious but musically gifted niece, which forces her to confront her past.

== Cast ==
The cast includes:

- Céline Bonnier as Mother Augustine
- Lysandre Ménard as Alice
- Diane Lavallée as Sister Lise
- Valérie Blais as Sister Claude
- Pierrette Robitaille as Sister Onésime
- Marie Tifo as the Mother General
- Marie-France Lambert as Madame Thompson
- Andrée Lachapelle as Mother Marie-Stéphane
- Maude Guérin as Marguerite

== Production ==
The screenplay was written by Marie Vien and Léa Pool, based on an original idea by Vien. Produced by Lyla Films, the film had an approximate budget of C$4.7 million and was shot over 30 days in March, April and May 2014.

For the student roles, Léa Pool cast young musicians rather than actresses because she wanted authenticity in the musical scenes.

== Reception ==
Variety wrote that the film made effective use of a premise that could have become clichéd, providing "a good dose of inspirational uplift without ever seeming to reach for it in the obvious, expected ways". The review praised its musical sequences and visual design. Boulder Weekly praised Pool’s attention to detail in depicting Catholic school life and wrote that she added “just enough whimsy” to give the film an “effervescent feel”.

Filmdienst described it as intelligent, subtle and charming, writing that the film portrayed the struggle of a progressive women’s convent for its future. The review praised the performances and the film’s musical references. SRF described the film as a fine drama in which music plays a central role, and wrote that it was also a strong women’s film with a large ensemble and emotional force.

== Awards and nominations ==
Award	Date of ceremony	Category	Recipient(s)	Result	Ref(s)
Canadian Screen Awards	13 March 2016	Best Actress	Céline Bonnier	Nominated	
Canadian Screen Awards	13 March 2016	Best Original Score	François Dompierre	Nominated	
Mill Valley Film Festival	8–18 October 2015	Audience Favorite, Gold – 2015 World Cinema Indie		Won	
Newport Beach Film Festival	23–30 April 2015	Best Feature Film		Won	
Newport Beach Film Festival	23–30 April 2015	Best Director	Léa Pool	Won	
Newport Beach Film Festival	23–30 April 2015	Best Screenplay	Marie Vien, Léa Pool	Won	
Newport Beach Film Festival	23–30 April 2015	Best Actress	Céline Bonnier	Won	
Newport Beach Film Festival	23–30 April 2015	Best Supporting Actress	Lysandre Ménard	Won	
Quebec Cinema Awards	20 March 2016	Best Film	Lyse Lafontaine, François Tremblay	Won	
Quebec Cinema Awards	20 March 2016	Best Director	Léa Pool	Won	
Quebec Cinema Awards	20 March 2016	Best Actress	Céline Bonnier	Won	
Quebec Cinema Awards	20 March 2016	Best Supporting Actress	Diane Lavallée	Won	
Quebec Cinema Awards	20 March 2016	Best Supporting Actress	Lysandre Ménard	Nominated	
Quebec Cinema Awards	20 March 2016	Best Screenplay	Marie Vien, Léa Pool	Nominated	
Quebec Cinema Awards	20 March 2016	Best Cinematography	Daniel Jobin	Nominated	
Quebec Cinema Awards	20 March 2016	Best Art Direction	Patrice Bengle	Nominated	
Quebec Cinema Awards	20 March 2016	Best Costume Design	Michèle Hamel	Won	
Quebec Cinema Awards	20 March 2016	Best Hairstyling	Martin Lapointe	Won	
