= The Time Thief =

2021 Canadian film by Francis Leclerc

- Theatrical release poster
- French: L'Arracheuse de temps
- Directed by: Francis Leclerc
- Screenplay by: Fred Pellerin
- Based on: L'Arracheuse de temps by Fred Pellerin
- Produced by: Antonello Cozzolino
- Starring: Jade Charbonneau; Marc Messier; Céline Bonnier; Guillaume Cyr; Émile Proulx-Cloutier; Marie-Ève Beauregard; Pier-Luc Funk; Sonia Cordeau; Geneviève Schmidt
- Cinematography: Steve Asselin
- Edited by: Isabelle Malenfant
- Music by: Fred Pellerin; Éloi Painchaud
- Production company: Attraction Images
- Distributed by: Les Films Séville
- Release date: November 19, 2021
- Country: Canada
- Language: French
- Budget: > $7 million
- Box office: $894,308

The Time Thief (French: L'Arracheuse de temps) is a 2021 Canadian period drama and fantasy film directed by Francis Leclerc, based on the 2009 story by Fred Pellerin of the same name. It stars Jade Charbonneau, Marc Messier, Céline Bonnier, Guillaume Cyr, Émile Proulx-Cloutier, Marie-Ève Beauregard, Pier-Luc Funk, Sonia Cordeau, and Geneviève Schmidt. The film was theatrically released by Les Films Séville on November 19, 2021.

== Premise ==
An illness-worn grandmother tries to convince her 11-year-old grandson that death does not exist. She tells him about the adventures of her youth in Saint-Élie-de-Caxton, in 1927, when she had tried to eliminate death in the village.

== Cast ==
- Jade Charbonneau as a young Bernadette
  - Michèle Deslauriers as an older Bernadette
- Marc Messier as Méo, a barber
- Céline Bonnier as La Stroop
- Guillaume Cyr as Riopel, a blacksmith, and father of Lurette
- Émile Proulx-Cloutier as Toussaint Brodeur, a merchant and Jeannette's husband
- Marie-Ève Beauregard as Lurette, Riopel's daughter
- Pier-Luc Funk
- Sonia Cordeau as Jeannette, Brodeur's wife
- Geneviève Schmidt as Madame Gélinas

== Production ==
=== Development ===
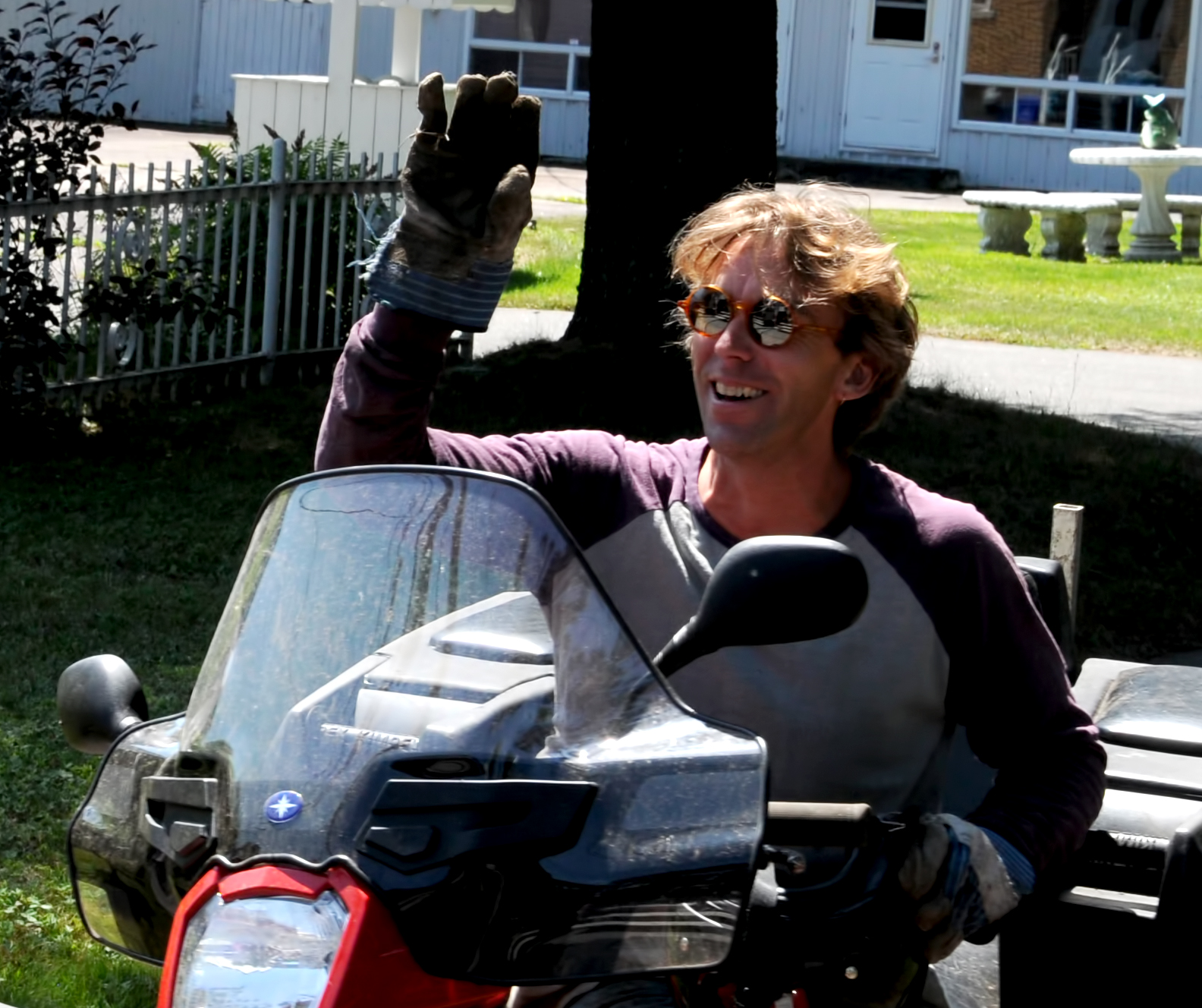
Fred Pellerin wrote the short story The Time Thief in 2007, adapting it into a feature film years later.

Fred Pellerin wrote the story L'Arracheuse de temps in 2007 shortly after the death of his father. On March 30, 2016, it was announced that a feature film adaptation of the story had been in the works from the production company Attraction Images. While working on the 2017 film Barefoot at Dawn with director Francis Leclerc, Pellerin wrote part of the initial screenplay for the film. On January 18, 2019, Leclerc revealed that he would direct the film, from a now-completed screenplay written by Pellerin. On April 8, 2019, the film's screenplay was submitted to SODEC, who announced on December 16, 2019, that they would be funding the film.

=== Filming ===
Filming for The Time Thief was divided into two filming blocks; the first began on October 13, 2020, in Saint-Armand, in the Eastern Townships of Quebec. Filming for the first block, which was mainly focused on shooting exterior scenes, continued in areas around the municipality of Montérégie, and concluded on October 30, 2020. Because of the COVID-19 pandemic, Fred Pellerin was not allowed to visit the film's set until October 15, 2020. The second filming block took place in April 2021 in areas around Montreal, with the intentions of shooting the film's interior scenes in a studio.

== Release ==
The Time Thief was theatrically released by Les Films Séville in the Canadian province of Quebec on November 19, 2021.

== Accolades ==
Accolades received by The Time Thief
Award	Date of ceremony	Category	Recipient(s)	Result	Ref.
Canadian Screen Awards	2022	Best Adapted Screenplay	Fred Pellerin	Nominated	
Canadian Screen Awards	2022	Best Art Direction/Production Design	Arnaud Brisebois, Jean Babin, Ève Turcotte	Won	
Canadian Screen Awards	2022	Best Costume Design	Josée Castonguay	Nominated	
Canadian Screen Awards	2022	Best Hair	Janie Otis	Nominated	
Canadian Screen Awards	2022	Best Visual Effects	Alain Lachance, Loïc Laurelut, Eric Clément, Marie-Claude Lafontaine	Nominated	
Prix Iris	2022	Best Supporting Actor	Guillaume Cyr	Nominated	
Prix Iris	2022	Best Supporting Actress	Céline Bonnier	Nominated	
Prix Iris	2022	Best Screenplay	Fred Pellerin	Nominated	
Prix Iris	2022	Best Art Direction	Arnaud Brisebois, Jean Babin, Ève Turcotte	Won	
Prix Iris	2022	Best Costume Design	Josée Castonguay	Nominated	
Prix Iris	2022	Best Cinematography	Steve Asselin	Nominated	
Prix Iris	2022	Best Original Music	Éloi Painchaud, Fred Pellerin	Nominated	
Prix Iris	2022	Best Sound	Olivier Calvert, Yann Cleary, Luc Boudrias	Nominated	
Prix Iris	2022	Best Hairstyling	Janie Otis	Nominated	
Prix Iris	2022	Best Makeup	Adriana Verbert, Bruno Gatien	Won	
Prix Iris	2022	Best Visual Effects	Alain Lachance, Loïc Laurelut, Éric Clément, Marie-Claude Lafontaine	Won	
Prix Iris	2022	Best Casting	Isabelle Thez Axelrad, Brigitte Viau	Nominated	
Prix Iris	2022	Public Prize	Antonello Cozzolino, Francis Leclerc, Fred Pellerin	Nominated	
