= The New Life of Paul Sneijder =

- Film poster
- French: La Nouvelle Vie de Paul Sneijder
- Directed by: Thomas Vincent
- Written by: Thomas Vincent; Yaël Cojot-Goldberg
- Based on: Le cas Sneijder by Jean-Paul Dubois
- Produced by: Pierre Forette; Thierry Wong
- Starring: Thierry Lhermitte; Géraldine Pailhas; Pierre Curzi; Guillaume Cyr; Aliocha Schneider
- Cinematography: Ronald Plante
- Edited by: Mike Fromentin
- Music by: Philippe Deshaies; Lionel Flairs; Benoit Rault
- Production company: Ciné Nominé
- Distributed by: SND Films; Christal Films
- Release date: 8 June 2016
- Running time: 114 minutes
- Countries: Canada; France
- Language: French

The New Life of Paul Sneijder (French: La Nouvelle Vie de Paul Sneijder) is a 2016 drama film, directed by Thomas Vincent. It is a co-production of Canada and France.

Based on the novel Le cas Sneijder by Jean-Paul Dubois, the film stars Thierry Lhermitte as Paul Sneijder, a man who is injured in an elevator accident which has also killed his daughter. Suffering an existential crisis which leads him to question the values on which he has based his life, he begins to rebuild his spirit by taking a new job as a dog walker. The film's cast also includes Géraldine Pailhas, Pierre Curzi, Guillaume Cyr and Aliocha Schneider. It was filmed on Nuns' Island, Montreal.

Cyr garnered a Prix Iris nomination for Best Supporting Actor at the 19th Quebec Cinema Awards in 2017.
