= Lysandre Ménard =

Canadian actress and musician

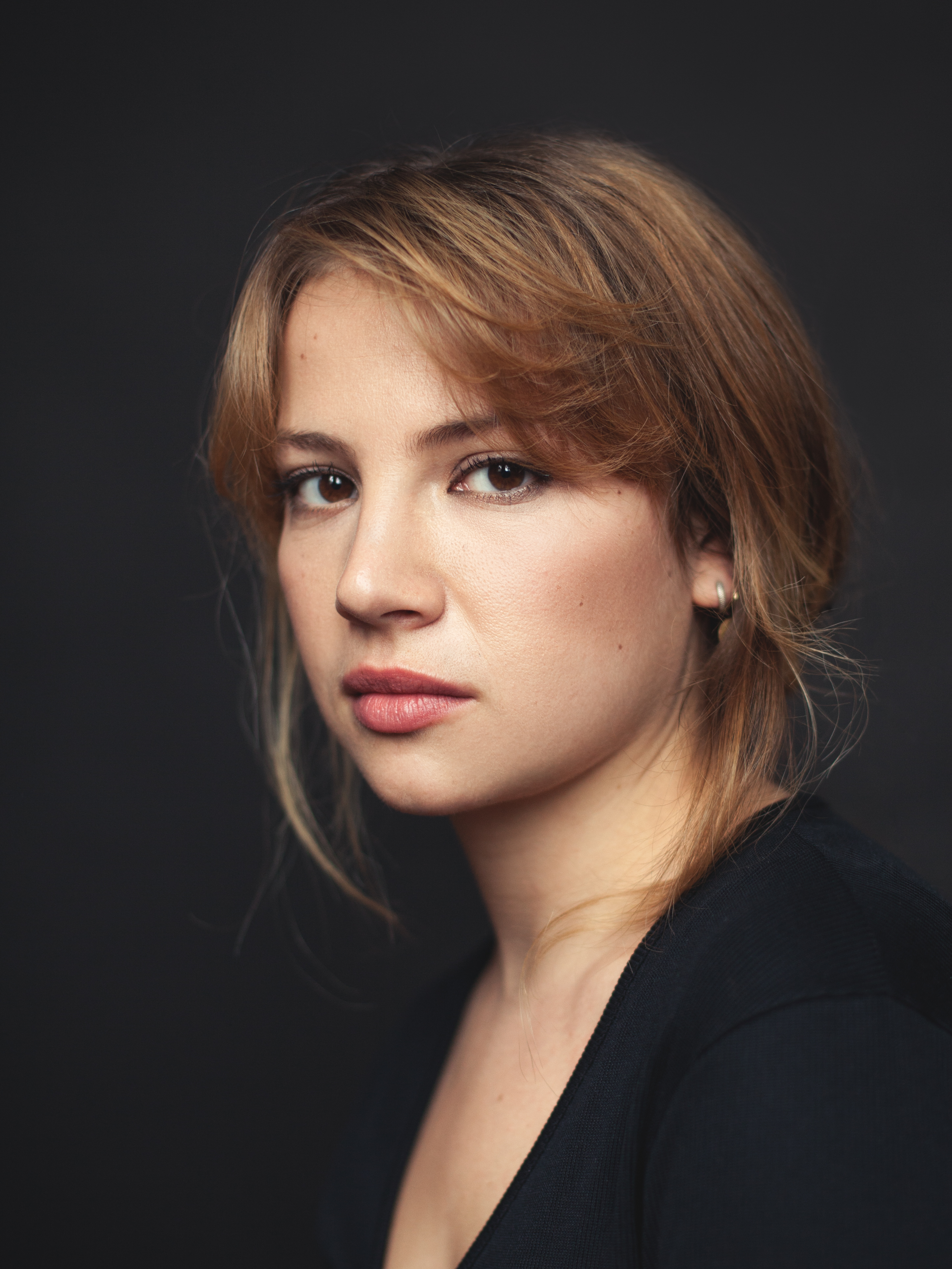
Portrait of Lysandre Ménard

Lysandre Ménard (born 1993 in Boucherville, Quebec) is a Canadian actress and musician. She is most noted for her performance in the 2015 film The Passion of Augustine (La Passion d'Augustine), for which she was a Quebec Cinema Award nominee for Best Supporting Actress at the 18th Quebec Cinema Awards in 2016, and her 2022 album Sans oublier, which was a Félix Award nominee for Alternative Album of the Year at the 44th Félix Awards in 2022.

She uses her full name when acting, but is mononymously billed as Lysandre in her music.

She has also appeared in the film Of Ink and Blood (D'Encre et de sang), and the television series Chaos.
