= Ludovic Dufresne =

Canadian film art director and production designer

Ludovic Dufresne is a Canadian film art director and production designer. He is most noted for his work on the films Noemie Says Yes (Noémie dit oui), for which he received a Directors Guild of Canada nomination for Best Production Design in a Feature Film in 2022, and Humanist Vampire Seeking Consenting Suicidal Person (Vampire humaniste cherche suicidaire consentant), for which he received a Canadian Screen Award nomination for Best Art Direction/Production Design at the 12th Canadian Screen Awards and won the Prix Iris for Best Art Direction at the 26th Quebec Cinema Awards.

Originally from Mont-Saint-Hilaire, Quebec, he is a graduate of the Université du Québec à Montréal.

His other credits as a designer and art director have included the films Heart Bomb (Une bombe au cœur), Ousmane, The Cheaters (Les Tricheurs), Operation Carcajou and Until You Die (Jusqu'à ce que tu meures). He has also directed a number of short films, including Collisions (2010), Analogue (2016), Canne Coune (2016) and August September (2019).
