= Straight for the Heart =

1988 drama film

- À corps perdu
- Directed by: Léa Pool
- Written by: Marcel Beaulieu; Léa Pool
- Based on: Kurwenal by Yves Navarre
- Produced by: Denise Robert; Robin Spry
- Starring: Matthias Habich; Johanne-Marie Tremblay; Michel Voïta; Jean-François Pichette
- Cinematography: Pierre Mignot
- Edited by: Michel Arcand
- Music by: Osvaldo Montes
- Release date: 1988
- Running time: 92 minutes
- Countries: Canada; Switzerland
- Language: French
- Budget: C$2.8 million

Straight for the Heart (French: À corps perdu) is a 1988 Canadian-Swiss French-language drama film directed by Léa Pool and written by Pool and Marcel Beaulieu. Adapted from Yves Navarre’s novel Kurwenal, the film follows a Montreal photojournalist who, on returning from a foreign assignment, finds that his ménage à trois relationship has ended. It won Best Dramatic Feature at the 1988 Atlantic Film Festival and was selected for competition at Venice and Chicago.

== Synopsis ==
Pierre Kurwenal, a photojournalist, returns to Montreal after an assignment in Nicaragua, where he has photographed scenes of political violence. He finds that Sarah and David, with whom he had lived in a long-term ménage à trois, have left him, and that Sarah is pregnant with David’s child. After confronting Sarah and David, Pierre wanders through Montreal and begins a relationship with Quentin, a deaf window washer.

== Cast ==
The cast includes:

- Matthias Habich as Pierre Kurwenal
- Johanne-Marie Tremblay as Sarah
- Michel Voïta as David
- Jean-François Pichette as Quentin
- Kim Yaroshevskaya as Noémie
- Jacqueline Bertrand as the mother
- France Castel as Michèle
- Victor Désy as Dr. Ferron

== Production ==
Straight for the Heart was a Canadian-Swiss co-production. It was produced by Denise Robert and Robin Spry, written by Léa Pool and Marcel Beaulieu, and adapted from Yves Navarre’s novel Kurwenal. The film had a budget of C$2.8 million.

== Reception ==
=== Awards ===
At the 1988 Atlantic Film Festival, À corps perdu won Best Dramatic Feature. The film also received awards from the Association québécoise des critiques de cinéma and the Société générale des industries culturelles in 1988.

=== Critical response ===
The New York Times described the film as a “visually compelling drama” and wrote that Lea Pool filmed Montreal with “exquisite sensitivity to the relationship among architecture, climate and the emotions”. The Los Angeles Times wrote that it was “ambitious and stylized” and described Matthias Habich as “the perfect actor for Pierre”.

Filmdienst praised the film’s sensitive use of visual montage to convey inner fracture. Filmbulletin wrote that it initially seemed at risk of fragmentation, but became clearer and denser as it progressed. It said the film’s stability and intensity came partly from Matthias Habich’s physical performance, and highlighted Pierre Mignot’s cinematography for its handling of visual contrasts.

== Festival screenings ==
À corps perdu was presented in competition at the 1988 Venice Film Festival. It also screened in official competition at the Chicago International Film Festival in 1988.

== See also ==
- List of LGBT films directed by women
