= Canadian Screen Award for Best Visual Effects =

Annual Canadian film award

- Country: Canada
- Presented by: Academy of Canadian Cinema & Television
- First award: 2011
- Currently held by: Tristan Zerafa, Lou Gatti, Mike Stadnyckyj, Graham Houston, Toshi Kosaka, James Soares, Christopher Shewchuk, Jeniree Bastidas, Onur Can Yol & Luca Tarantini for Nirvanna the Band the Show the Movie (2025)
- Website: academy.ca/awards

The Canadian Screen Award for Best Visual Effects is an annual award, presented by the Academy of Canadian Cinema and Television to honour achievements in visual effects in Canadian film.

The award was introduced for the first time at the 32nd Genie Awards. It has been presented since as part of the Canadian Screen Awards.

Note that years listed here are the year of the nominated films' release, not the year of the award presentation.

== 2010s ==
Year	Nominees	Films	Ref
2011; 32nd Genie Awards
2011; 32nd Genie Awards	Vincent Dudouet, Cynthia Mourou, Éric Normandin, Martin Pensa, Marc Cote, Stephanie Broussaud, Sylvain Theroux, Luc Sansfacon, Nathalie Tremblay, Garry Chuntz	Café de Flore	
2011; 32nd Genie Awards	Ovidiu Cinazan, Mike Borrett, Milan Schere, Oliver Hearsey, Dennis Berardi, Mathew Borrett, Wilson Cameron, Jim Price, Wojciech Zielinski, Jason Edwardh	A Dangerous Method	
2011; 32nd Genie Awards	Robert Crowther, Tony Cybulski, Ian Britton, Tom Turnbull	Citizen Gangster	
2011; 32nd Genie Awards	Geoffroy Lauzon	BumRush	
2011; 32nd Genie Awards	Jacques Levesque, Eve Brunet, Philippe Roberge	Snow & Ashes	
2012; 1st Canadian Screen Awards
2012; 1st Canadian Screen Awards	Dennis Berardi, Jason Edwardh, Matt Glover, Trey Harrell, Leann Harvey, Jo Hughes, Ethan Lee, Scott Riopelle, Eric Robinson, Kyle Yoneda	Resident Evil: Retribution	
2012; 1st Canadian Screen Awards	Dennis Berardi, Keith Acheson, Michael Borrett, Wilson Cameron, Michael DiCarlo, Tom Nagy, Britton Plewes, Scott Riopelle, Matt Whelan, Wojciech Zielinski	Silent Hill: Revelation 3D	
2012; 1st Canadian Screen Awards	Ève Brunet, Marc Morissette, Alexandra Vaillancourt	War Witch (Rebelle)	
2012; 1st Canadian Screen Awards	Ralph Maiers, Debora Dunphy, John Fukushima, Patrick Kavanaugh, Bill Martin, Chris Philips, Jeremy Price, Kenton Rannie, Lauren Weidel	Midnight's Children	
2012; 1st Canadian Screen Awards	Carlos Monzon, Martin Belleau, Dominic Daigle, Nathalie Dupont, Gaël Hollard, Benoît Ladouceur, Viviane Levesque Bouchard, Jérémie Lodomez, Anie Normandin, Alexandra Vaillancourt	Mars and April (Mars et Avril)	
2013; 2nd Canadian Screen Awards
2013; 2nd Canadian Screen Awards	Andy Robinson, Dennis Berardi, Edward J. Taylor IV, James Cooper, Jason Edwardh, Jo Hughes, Leann Harvey, Sean Mills, Stephen Wagner, Trey Harrell	The Mortal Instruments: City of Bones	
2013; 2nd Canadian Screen Awards	Aélis Héraud, Antoine Wibaut, Catherine Hébert, Cyntha Carrier, David Raymond, Jonathan Legris, Josée Chapdelaine, Louis-Alexandre Lord, Pierre-Simon Lebrun-Chaput, Sarah Neveu	Louis Cyr	
2013; 2nd Canadian Screen Awards	Annie Normandin, Dominic Daigle, François Dumoulin, Marc Morisette, Olivier Goulet	Upside Down	
2013; 2nd Canadian Screen Awards	Laetitia Séguin, Marie-Cecile Dahan, Mathieu Veillette, Matthew Rouleau, Mikael Damant-Sirois, Patrick David and Vincent Poitras	Enemy	
2013; 2nd Canadian Screen Awards	Aaron Weintraub, Ayo Burgess, Dennis Berardi, Edward J. Taylor IV, Jason Gougeon, Kyle Yoneda, Michael Borrett, Michael Rice, Sarah McMurdo, Tamara Stone	Mama	
2014; 3rd Canadian Screen Awards
2014; 3rd Canadian Screen Awards	Keith Acheson, Dennis Berardi, Ayo Burgess, Naomi Foakes, Jo Hughes, Chris MacLean, Mohsen Mousavi, Scott Riopelle, Andy Robinson, Eric Robinson	Pompeii	
2014; 3rd Canadian Screen Awards	Ian Britton, Robert Crowther, Steve Elliott, Oleksiy Golovchenko, Matt Philip, Jiang Shuming, Jay Stanners, Rob Tasker, Perunika Yorgova, Lexi Young	Wet Bum	
2014; 3rd Canadian Screen Awards	Jason Dowdeswell, Neil Eskuri, Patti Gannon, Ivan Hayden, Neil Impey, Zach Lipovsky, James Rorick, Adele Venables	Afflicted	
2015; 4th Canadian Screen Awards
2015; 4th Canadian Screen Awards	Phil Jones, Sarah Wormsbecher, Eric Doiron, Anthony DeChellis, Lon Molnar, Geoff D.E. Scott, Nathan Larouche, Mark Fordham	Hyena Road	
2015; 4th Canadian Screen Awards	Marcelo Alves de Souza, Paulo Barcellos, Adams Carvalho, George Schall, Luis Dourado, Emerson Bonadias, Diego Moreira, Luciano Santa Barbara, Thiago Sá, Luis Dreyfuss	Zoom	
2015; 4th Canadian Screen Awards	Eric Doiron, Sarah Wormsbecher, Nathan Larouche, Anthony DeChellis, Geoff D.E. Scott, Jason Snea, Joel Chambers, Kaiser Thomas, Lon Molnar, Rob Kennedy	Remember	
2015; 4th Canadian Screen Awards	Alain Lachance, Eve Brunet	Endorphine	
2015; 4th Canadian Screen Awards	Darren Wall	Borealis	
2016; 5th Canadian Screen Awards
2016; 5th Canadian Screen Awards	Martin Lipmann, Cynthia Mourou, Benoît Touchette, Jonathan Piché-Delorme, Frédéric Breault	Race	
2016; 5th Canadian Screen Awards	Bob Habros, Adele Venables, Julika Pape, Milos Djakovic, Adam Kube, Mike Wearing, Richard Darwin	The Unseen	
2016; 5th Canadian Screen Awards	Tristan Zerafa	Operation Avalanche	
2017; 6th Canadian Screen Awards
2017; 6th Canadian Screen Awards	Alain Lachance, Yann Jouannic, Hugo Léveillé, Nadège Bozetti, Antonin Messier-Turcotte, Thibault Deloof, Francis Bernard	Hochelaga, Land of Souls (Hochelaga terre des âmes)	
2017; 6th Canadian Screen Awards	Greg Behrens, Brendan Taylor, Jasmine Scott, Martin O'Brien	The Man Who Invented Christmas	
2017; 6th Canadian Screen Awards	Marc Hall	The Cyclotron (Le Cyclotron)	
2017; 6th Canadian Screen Awards	Marc Hall, Jonathan Cyr, Emmanuel Bazin, Clément Natiez, Emmanuelle Gill	The Little Girl Who Was Too Fond of Matches (La petite fille qui aimait trop les allumettes)	
2017; 6th Canadian Screen Awards	Jonathan Piché Delorme, Fabienne Mouillac, Alain Lachance, Caroline Guagliardo, Alexandre Tremblay, Thibault Deloof, Benoit Gagnon	We Are the Others (Nous sommes les autres)	
2018; 7th Canadian Screen Awards
2018; 7th Canadian Screen Awards	Benoit Brière, Bruno Maillard	Just a Breath Away (Dans la brume)	
2018; 7th Canadian Screen Awards	William Chang, Brian Huynh	Our House	
2018; 7th Canadian Screen Awards	Philippe Frère, Stéphane Thibert, Alexandre Rouil, Véronique Dessard, Loïc Poës, Barthélémy Beaux, Morgan Hardy, Bernard Devillers, Gaël Durant	The Hummingbird Project	
2018; 7th Canadian Screen Awards	Fredrik Nord	Stockholm	
2018; 7th Canadian Screen Awards	Jean-François Talbot, Jean-Pierre Boies	1991	
2019; 8th Canadian Screen Awards
2019; 8th Canadian Screen Awards	Adam Jewett, Steve Ramone, Michelle Brennen, Tim Sibley, Aneesh Bhatnagar, Saikrishna Aleti, Peter Giliberti, Alex Basso, Arminus Billones, Marshall Lau	Brotherhood	
2019; 8th Canadian Screen Awards	Sam Javanrouh, Helen Thach	Astronaut	
2019; 8th Canadian Screen Awards	Steven Sangster	Road to the Lemon Grove	
2019; 8th Canadian Screen Awards	Benoît Brière, Kinga Sabela	Sympathy for the Devil (Sympathie pour le diable)	
2019; 8th Canadian Screen Awards	Marc-Antoine Rousseau	The Song of Names	

== 2020s ==
Year	Nominee	Film	Ref
2020; 9th Canadian Screen Awards
2020; 9th Canadian Screen Awards	Joshua Sherrett, Barbara Rosenstein, Ibi Atemie, David Atexide, Juan Carlos Ferrá, Alex Flynn, Andrei Gheorghiu, Felix Sherrett-Brown, Ali Hamidikia, Tony Wu	Blood Quantum	
2020; 9th Canadian Screen Awards	Brian Huynh, William Chang, Steven Huynh, Sophia Jooyeon Lee, Justin Perreault	Code 8	
2020; 9th Canadian Screen Awards	Peter McAuley, Michael Bishop, Derek Gebhart, Armen Bunag, Luke White, James Marin, Marco Polsinelli, Andrew Rolfe, Davor Celar	Funny Boy	
2020; 9th Canadian Screen Awards	Liam Neville, Kenneth Coyne, Piers Larchet, Rob Murray, Shane Browne, Dave Thomas, Mihail Dumbravestu, Allen Sillery, Christoph Gaudi, Michael McCarthy	French Exit	
2020; 9th Canadian Screen Awards	François Trudel, Cynthia Mourou	Laughter (Le Rire)	
2021; 10th Canadian Screen Awards
2021; 10th Canadian Screen Awards	Martin Tori, Darwin Go, John Mariella, Frank Rueter	Night Raiders	
2021; 10th Canadian Screen Awards	Alex Boothby	All My Puny Sorrows	
2021; 10th Canadian Screen Awards	Marc Côté, Michael Beaulac, Robert Rioux, Lisa Purisima, Maxime Lepage, Anouk Cazalis, Alex Harvey, Wesley Lemieux, Daniel Coupal, Randy Santandrea	Brain Freeze	
2021; 10th Canadian Screen Awards	Matthew J.R. Bishop, Ila Soleimani, Jeff Robinson, Aravindan Rajasingham, Gustavo Fernandes, Belma Abdicevic, Tom Perry, Steve Lowry, Tarl Lambert	Dino Dana: The Movie	
2021; 10th Canadian Screen Awards	Alain Lachance, Loïc Laurelut, Eric Clément, Marie-Claude Lafontaine	The Time Thief (L'arracheuse de temps)	
2022; 11th Canadian Screen Awards
2022; 11th Canadian Screen Awards	Peter MacAuley, Kayden Anderson, Tom Turnbull, Caitlin Foster	Crimes of the Future	
2022; 11th Canadian Screen Awards	Landon Bootsma, Dexter Davey, Ashley Hampton, Milton Muller, Dmitry Vinnik	Until Branches Bend	
2022; 11th Canadian Screen Awards	Jean-François Ferland, Marie-Claude Lafontaine, Charles Lamoureux	Lines of Escape (Lignes de fuite)	
2022; 11th Canadian Screen Awards	Eric Gambini, Sarah Krusch Flanagan, Louis Mackall, Virginie Strub, Andrew Joe, Gabriel Chiang, Linus Burghardt	Bones of Crows	
2022; 11th Canadian Screen Awards	Marc Hall	Babysitter	
2022; 11th Canadian Screen Awards	James Anthony Young	Cult Hero	
2023; 12th Canadian Screen Awards
2023; 12th Canadian Screen Awards	Andy Robinson	Infinity Pool	
2023; 12th Canadian Screen Awards	Jeff Bruneel, James Miligan, Tamara Young, Nick Winger, Adam Graves	In Flames	
2023; 12th Canadian Screen Awards	Adam Graves	The King Tide	
2023; 12th Canadian Screen Awards	Marie-Claude Lafontaine, Jean-François Ferland, Simon Beaupré	One Summer (Le temps d'un été)	
2023; 12th Canadian Screen Awards	Tristan Zerafa, Lou Gatti, Matthew Nayman, Mike Boers	BlackBerry	
2024; 13th Canadian Screen Awards
2024; 13th Canadian Screen Awards	Brian Huynh, Sophia Jooyeon Lee, Steven Huynh, Justin Perreault, Michael Davison	Code 8: Part II	
2024; 13th Canadian Screen Awards	Rob Geddes, Kim Walker, Sean Gilhooly, Gavin Jung, Tom Mangat, Gordon Oscar	Levels	
2024; 13th Canadian Screen Awards	Peter McAuley, Guillaume Le Gouez, Pierre Procoudine Gorsky, Aurore Rousset	The Shrouds	
2024; 13th Canadian Screen Awards	Robert Munroe, Tim M. Townsend, Marcin Kolendo, Leo Bovell	Sharp Corner	
2024; 13th Canadian Screen Awards	Ricardo Santillana, Evren Boisjoli, Julia Aubry	Hunting Daze (Jour de chasse)	
2025; 14th Canadian Screen Awards
2025; 14th Canadian Screen Awards	Tristan Zerafa, Lou Gatti, Mike Stadnyckyj, Graham Houston, Toshi Kosaka, James Soares, Christopher Shewchuk, Jeniree Bastidas, Onur Can Yol, Luca Tarantini	Nirvanna the Band the Show the Movie	
2025; 14th Canadian Screen Awards	Matt Glover, Dave Sauro	Out Standing	
2025; 14th Canadian Screen Awards	Marc Hall, Moon Marsolais, Vincent Campbell, David Atexide, Glavens Monfleury	Out Standing	
2025; 14th Canadian Screen Awards	Cody Kennedy	Deathstalker	
2025; 14th Canadian Screen Awards	Vineshh Vickinadas	Scared Shitless	

== See also ==
- Prix Iris for Best Visual Effects
