= A Sentimental Capitalism =

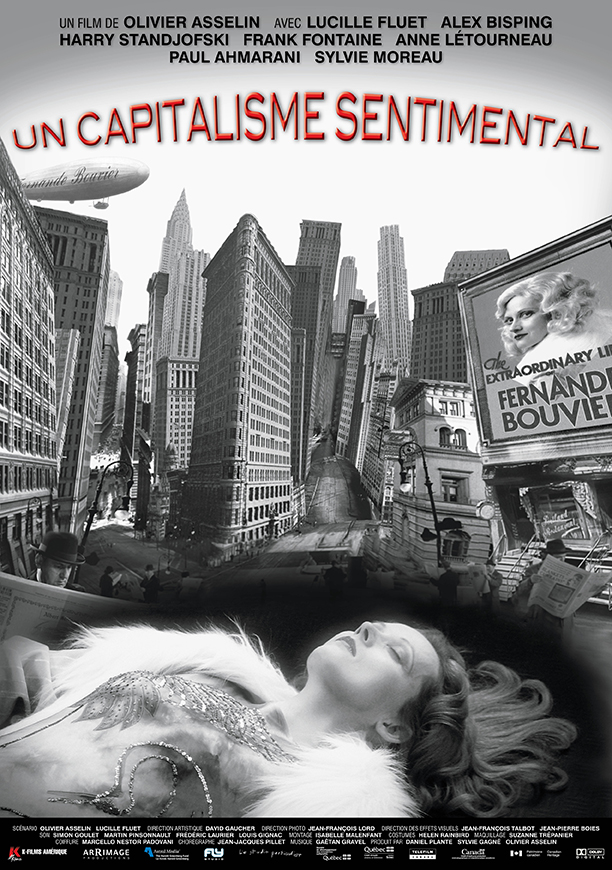
- Film poster
- French: Un capitalisme sentimental
- Directed by: Olivier Asselin
- Written by: Olivier Asselin; Lucille Fluet
- Produced by: Sylvie Gagné; Daniel Plante
- Starring: Lucille Fluet; Alex Bisping; Paul Ahmarani
- Cinematography: Derek Kennedy; Jean-François Lord
- Edited by: Isabelle Malenfant
- Music by: Gaëtan Gravel
- Production companies: K Films Amérique; Arrimage Production
- Distributed by: Filmoption
- Release date: October 8, 2008 (FNC)
- Running time: 92 minutes
- Country: Canada
- Language: French

A Sentimental Capitalism (French: Un capitalisme sentimental) is a Canadian comedy-drama film, directed by Olivier Asselin and released in 2008. The film stars Lucille Fluet as Fernande Bouvier, an aspiring artist in Paris in the 1920s who unwittingly becomes the cause of the Wall Street crash of 1929 after businessman Victor Feldman (Alex Bisping) bets two of his colleagues that he can sell her on the financial market despite her lack of tangible artistic output.

The film's cast also includes Paul Ahmarani, Frank Fontaine, Sylvie Moreau, Anne Létourneau, Harry Standjofski and Steve Barry.

The film premiered on October 8, 2008, as the opening film of the Festival du nouveau cinéma. It was regarded by some critics as prophetic, as the 2008 financial crisis was in full swing by the time of its release.

Isabelle Malenfant received a Jutra Award nomination for Best Editing at the 11th Jutra Awards in 2009.
