= Jean-François Ferland =

Canadian visual effects supervisor

Jean-François "Jafaz" Ferland is a Canadian visual effects supervisor, who was the founding president of the Alchemy 24 effects studio.

== Awards ==
Award	Date of ceremony	Category	Work	Result	Ref(s)
Canadian Screen Awards	2023	Best Visual Effects	Lines of Escape (Lignes de fuite) (with Marie-Claude Lafontaine, Charles Lamoureux)	Nominated	
Canadian Screen Awards	2024	Best Visual Effects	One Summer (Le temps d'un été) (with Marie-Claude Lafontaine, Jean-François Ferland, Simon Beaupré)	Nominated	
Prix Iris	2018	Best Visual Effects	Ravenous (Les Affamés)	Won	
Prix Iris	2018	Best Visual Effects	Barefoot at Dawn (Pieds nus dans l'aube) (with Marie-Claude Lafontaine)	Nominated	
Prix Iris	2018	Best Visual Effects	Infiltration (Le problème d'infiltration)	Nominated	
Prix Iris	2019	Best Visual Effects	La Bolduc (with Marie-Claude Lafontaine)	Nominated	
Prix Iris	2021	Best Visual Effects	The Decline (Jusqu'au déclin) (with Sébastien Chartier, Marie-Claude Lafontaine)	Won	
Prix Iris	2022	Best Visual Effects	Maria Chapdelaine (with Marie-Claude Lafontaine)	Nominated	
Prix Iris	2024	Best Visual Effects	Humanist Vampire Seeking Consenting Suicidal Person (Vampire humaniste cherche suicidaire consentant) (with Marie-Claude Lafontaine, Simon Beaupré)	Won	
Prix Iris	2024	Best Visual Effects	Sisters and Neighbors! (Nos belles-sœurs) (with Sébastien Chartier, Marie-Claude Lafontaine)	Nominated	
