= Malarek =

1988 Canadian film

- Directed by: Roger Cardinal
- Written by: Avrum Jacobson
- Based on: Hey, Malarek! by Victor Malarek
- Produced by: Jamie Brown; Robin Spry
- Starring: Elias Koteas; Kerrie Keane; Al Waxman; Daniel Pilon
- Cinematography: Karol Ike
- Edited by: Yves Langlois
- Music by: Alexandre Stanké
- Production company: Telescene Film Group
- Distributed by: New World Pictures
- Release date: December 16, 1988
- Running time: 100 minutes
- Country: Canada
- Language: English

Malarek is a Canadian drama film, directed by Roger Cardinal and released in 1988. Based on the memoirs of Canadian investigative journalist Victor Malarek, the film stars Elias Koteas as Malarek during his early career in journalism.

The film's plot centres on Malarek, as a newly hired junior reporter in Montreal, Quebec, investigating unsafe and inhumane conditions in the province's juvenile detention system, interspersed with flashbacks to Malarek's own troubled youth when he spent some time in the very same system. The cast also includes Ross Hull as the young Malarek in the flashback scenes, as well as Kerrie Keane, Al Waxman, Daniel Pilon, Susan Glover, Bruce Ramsay, Vittorio Rossi, Michael Sarrazin and Walter Massey.

The film premiered in limited engagement in December 1988, before going into wider commercial release in March 1989.

The film received three Genie Award nominations at the 10th Genie Awards in 1989, for Best Director (Cardinal), Best Actor (Koteas) and Best Cinematography (Karol Ike).

The film's producers subsequently created the television drama series Urban Angel, which was also based in part on Malarek's life but centred on a renamed and partially fictionalized character.
