= We Are the Others (film) =

- Caption
- French: Nous sommes les autres
- Directed by: Jean-François Asselin
- Written by: Jean-François Asselin; Jacques Drolet
- Produced by: Pierre Even
- Starring: Pascale Bussières; Émile Proulx-Cloutier; Jean-Michel Anctil; James Hyndman
- Cinematography: Mathieu Laverdière
- Edited by: Simon Sauvé
- Music by: Mathieu Vanasse
- Production company: Item 7
- Distributed by: Christal Films
- Release date: November 7, 2017 (Quebec)
- Running time: 80 minutes
- Country: Canada
- Language: French

We Are the Others (French: Nous sommes les autres) is a Canadian psychological thriller film, directed and co-written by Jean-François Asselin and released in 2017. The film stars Pascale Bussières as Myriam Lambert, an architect struggling to keep her personal life and business afloat after her partner Alexandre disappears, and Émile Proulx-Cloutier as Frédéric Venne, a junior architect with the firm who is offered the opportunity to salvage the big project threatened by Alexandre's disappearance.

== Accolades ==
The film received four nominations at the 6th Canadian Screen Awards, including Best Actor for Proulx-Cloutier.

Award	Date of ceremony	Category	Recipient(s)	Result	Ref(s)
Canadian Screen Awards	11 March 2018	Best Actor	Émile Proulx-Cloutier	Nominated	
Canadian Screen Awards	11 March 2018	Best Cinematography	Mathieu Laverdière	Nominated	
Canadian Screen Awards	11 March 2018	Best Costume Design	Julie Bécotte	Nominated	
Canadian Screen Awards	11 March 2018	Best Visual Effects	Jonathan Piché Delorme, Fabienne Mouillac, Alain Lachance, Caroline Guagliardo, Alexandre Tremblay, Thibault Deloof and Benoit Gagnon	Nominated	
Prix Iris	3 June 2018	Best Art Direction	Jean-Marc Renaud	Nominated	
Prix Iris	3 June 2018	Costume Design	Julie Bécotte	Nominated	
Prix Iris	3 June 2018	Best Make-Up	Marlène Rouleau	Nominated	
Prix Iris	3 June 2018	Best Hairstyling	Anne-Marie Lanza	Nominated	
Prix Iris	3 June 2018	Best Visual Effects	Jonathan Piché Delorme, Fabienne Mouillac, Alain Lachance, Caroline Guagliardo, Alexandre Tremblay, Thibault Deloof and Benoit Gagnon	Nominated	
