= Atomic Saké =

- Directed by: Louise Archambault
- Written by: Louise Archambault
- Produced by: François Landry
- Starring: Audrey Benoit; Suzanne Clément; Noémie Godin-Vigneau
- Cinematography: André Turpin
- Edited by: Sophie Leblond
- Music by: Luc Raymond
- Production company: Filmo
- Distributed by: Cinéma Libre
- Release date: October 21, 1999 (FNC)
- Running time: 31 minutes
- Country: Canada
- Language: French

Atomic Saké is a 1999 Canadian short drama film, directed by Louise Archambault. The film centres on Ariane (Audrey Benoit), Véronique (Suzanne Clément) and Mathilde (Noémie Godin-Vigneau), three female friends talking over drinks who decide to reveal their innermost secrets, including Mathilde's revelation that she is in love with Ariane and tries to come out to her.

The film has been described by critics as having a Rashomon-like structure of shifting perspectives on the subjective nature of truth.

The film premiered at Montreal's Festival du nouveau cinéma in 1999, and was later screened at festivals including the 2000 Toronto International Film Festival and the 2001 Inside Out Film and Video Festival.

The film won the Prix Jutra for Best Short Film at the 2nd Jutra Awards.
