= Marcel Beaulieu =

Canadian screenwriter

Marcel Beaulieu (born 1952) is a Canadian screenwriter from Quebec. He is most noted as cowriter with Francis Leclerc of the 2004 film Looking for Alexander (Mémoires affectives), for which they won the Genie Award for Best Original Screenplay at the 25th Genie Awards in 2005. Beaulieu and Leclerc were also nominated for the Jutra Award for Best Screenplay at the 7th Jutra Awards the same year.

His other credits have included the films Anne Trister, In the Shadow of the Wind (Les Fous de Bassan), Straight for the Heart (À corps perdu), In the Belly of the Dragon (Dans le ventre du dragon), Cap Tourmente, Farinelli, A Girl at the Window (Une jeune fille à la fenêtre), On Your Head (Le Ciel sur la tête), The Childhood of Icarus (L'Enfance d'Icare), Fear of Water (La Peur de l'eau) and Meetings with a Young Poet.
