= Victor Malarek =

Canadian journalist and author

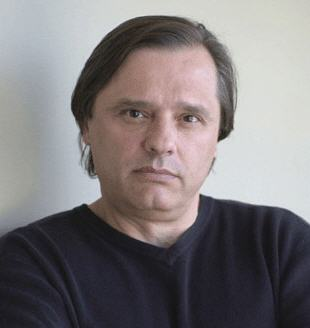
- Born: Victor Gregory Malarek; 26 June 1948 (age 77); Lachine, Quebec, Canada
- Occupations: author, journalist
- Television: The Fifth Estate; W5
- Awards: Gemini Award

Victor Gregory Malarek (born 26 June 1948) is a Canadian journalist and author, known for his book Hey, Malarek! and his tenure as one of the hosts of CBC's The Fifth Estate, as well as his depiction in the movie Target Number One (known as Most Wanted in the United States). He retired as senior investigative reporter for CTV's W5 in 2017.

== Biography ==
Victor Malarek was born on 26 June 1948 in Lachine, Quebec. Malarek attended the High School of Montreal, where he had a hard time. He also experienced the child protection system in his youth. He gives a colourful account of his early days in his book Hey, Malarek! (1984), which was a popular success and was made into a film.

Malarek entered the world of journalism in 1968 as a copy boy for Weekend Magazine, and joined The Montreal Star as a police reporter in 1970. His first major assignment was reporting on the Quebec October Crisis.

Malarek became a writer for The Globe and Mail in 1976. He received three Michener Awards during his 14-year tenure with the Globe.

In 1989, he was portrayed by Elias Koteas in the movie Malarek, based on his first book Hey, Malarek! These works depict the journalist's turbulent youth. The 16-part CBC fictional drama series Urban Angel in the 1991–1992 season was also inspired by Malarek's life.

From 1990 to 2000, Malarek was one of the hosts for CBC's The Fifth Estate. In The Fifth Estate episode "The One That Got Away", Malarek exposed police and prosecutorial misconduct that resulted in Calmar man Jason Dix's wrongful accusation of double murder. After the episode aired, Dix was awarded a judgment of almost $765,000. In 1997, Malarek won a Gemini Award as Canada's top broadcast journalist. He received another Michener Award while at the Fifth Estate.

In 2020, his 1980s investigation of the arrest of Canadian drug addict Alain Olivier in Thailand was dramatized in the film Target Number One (known as Most Wanted in the United States), in which he was portrayed by Josh Hartnett.

From 2000 to his retirement in 2017 Malarek worked as the senior reporter for CTV's investigative program W5.

Malarek is the author of nine books. His most recent book, Putin's Assassin, was released in 2024.

== Bibliography ==
- 1984: Hey, Malarek! : The True Story of a Street Kid Who Made It ISBN 0-7715-9795-9 (Macmillan Publishers)
  - French version Hé, Malarek! ISBN 2-89249-136-3, (Éditions du Trécarré, translation by Michel Beaulieu)
- 1987: Haven's Gate: Canada's Immigration Fiasco, ISBN 0-7715-9497-6 (Macmillan)
- 1989: Merchants of Misery, ISBN 0-7715-9429-1 (Macmillan)
- 1996: Gut Instinct: The Making of an Investigative Reporter, ISBN 0-7715-7383-9 (Macmillan)
- 2003: The Natashas: Inside the Global Sex Trade, ISBN 0-670-04312-5 (Viking Books)
- 2009: The Johns: Sex for Sale and the Men Who Buy It, ISBN 1559708905 (Key Porter)
- 2014: Orphanage 41, ISBN 978-1-4602-4414-2 (FriesenPress)
- 2021: WheatShaft, ISBN 1-0391-2142-X (FriesenPress) (Matt Kozar Book 1)
- 2024: Putin's Assassin, ISBN 978-1-03-831394-2 (FriesenPress) (Matt Kozar Book 2)
