= Karol Ike =

Polish-Canadian photographer and cinematographer

Karol Ike-Duninowski (October 1, 1935 - September 16, 2022), known professionally as Karol Ike, was a Polish-Canadian photographer and cinematographer. He was most noted for his work on the 1988 film Malarek, for which he received a Genie Award nomination for Best Cinematography at the 10th Genie Awards in 1989.

Born and raised in Warsaw, he emigrated with his family to Switzerland after World War II, before moving to Canada in 1961, where he opened his own photography studio before moving into cinematography.

== Filmography ==
- Summerlust - 1973
- Concrete Angels - 1987
- Dreams Beyond Memory - 1988
- Malarek - 1988
- Shades of Love - 1988, five episodes
- Dracula Live from Transylvania - 1989
- The Campbells - 1989, ten episodes
- The Phone Call - 1989
- Ding et Dong, le film - 1990
- Are You Afraid of the Dark? - 1990-96, 39 episodes
- Shadows of the Past - 1991
- The Final Heist - 1991
- A Christmas Story at the Vatican - 1991
- Kids Like You - 1995, one episode
- The Lost Daughter - 1997
