= Trotteur =

2011 Canadian short film

- Directed by: Arnaud Brisebois; Francis Leclerc
- Produced by: Antonello Cozzolino
- Starring: Kyle Gatehouse
- Cinematography: Steve Asselin
- Edited by: Isabelle Malenfant
- Music by: Luc Sicard
- Production company: Cirrus Communications
- Release date: 2011
- Running time: 8 minutes
- Country: Canada
- Language: French

Trotteur is a Canadian short drama film, directed by Arnaud Brisebois and Francis Leclerc and released in 2011. Inspired in part by the legend of Alexis Lapointe, the film stars Kyle Gatehouse as a man who is trying to outrun a train.

The film was screened at various film festivals, including the 2011 Toronto International Film Festival and the 2012 Tribeca Film Festival, and was commercially distributed in Quebec as the opening film to screenings of The Artist.

The film was named to TIFF's annual year-end Canada's Top Ten list for 2011, and won the Jutra Award for Best Live Action Short Film at the 14th Jutra Awards in 2012.
