= Lucy Grizzli Sophie =

2024 Canadian thriller film

- Directed by: Anne Émond
- Written by: Catherine-Anne Toupin
- Based on: La Meute by Catherine-Anne Toupin
- Produced by: Louis-Philippe Drolet; Félize Frappier; Louis Morissette
- Starring: Catherine Anne Toupin; Guillaume Cyr; Lise Roy
- Cinematography: Olivier Gossot
- Edited by: Richard Comeau; François Jaros
- Music by: Martin Léon
- Production companies: KO24; Max Films Media
- Distributed by: Sphere Films
- Release date: February 21, 2024 (RVQC)
- Running time: 89 minutes
- Country: Canada
- Language: French

Lucy Grizzli Sophie is a Canadian thriller drama film, directed by Anne Émond and released in 2024. Adapted from Catherine-Anne Toupin's stage play La Meute, the film stars Toupin as Sophie, a woman who is taking refuge from a violent incident in the city at a rural bed and breakfast run by Louise (Lise Roy) and her nephew Martin (Guillaume Cyr).

The cast also includes Marjorie Armstrong, Patrick Caux, Josée Laviolette and Mathias Retamal.

The film premiered on February 21, 2024, as the opening film of the Rendez-vous Québec Cinéma, before opening commercially on February 23.
