= Jean Babin =

Canadian art director and production designer

- Occupation(s): Art director, Production designer
- Notable work: The Time Thief (L'Arracheuse de temps)
- Awards: Canadian Screen Award for Best Art Direction/Production Design (2022); Genie Award nomination for Best Art Direction (2010); Jutra/Iris nominations for Best Art Direction (2005, 2010, 2014, 2017)

Jean Babin is a Canadian art director and production designer. He is most noted for his work on the film The Time Thief (L'Arracheuse de temps), for which he, Arnaud Brisebois, and Ève Turcotte won the Canadian Screen Award for Best Art Direction/Production Design at the 10th Canadian Screen Awards in 2022.

He was also nominated in the same year for his work on Maria Chapdelaine, and was previously nominated at the 30th Genie Awards in 2010 for The Master Key (Grande Ourse: La Clé des possibles).

He has also been a four-time Jutra/Iris nominee for Best Art Direction, receiving nods at the 7th Jutra Awards in 2005 for Dans une galaxie près de chez vous, at the 12th Jutra Awards in 2010 for The Master Key, at the 16th Jutra Awards in 2014 for Triptych (Triptyque), and at the 19th Quebec Cinema Awards in 2017 for Wild Run: The Legend (Chasse-Galerie: La Légende).
