= One Summer (film) =

2023 Canadian comedy-drama film

- French: Le temps d'un été
- Directed by: Louise Archambault
- Written by: Marie Vien
- Produced by: Antonello Cozzolino; Brigitte Léveillé
- Starring: Patrice Robitaille; Guy Nadon; Élise Guilbault
- Cinematography: Mathieu Laverdière
- Edited by: Isabelle Malenfant
- Production company: Attraction Images
- Distributed by: Immina Films
- Release date: July 4, 2023
- Running time: 120 minutes
- Country: Canada
- Language: French

One Summer (French: Le temps d'un été) is a 2023 Canadian comedy-drama film, directed by Louise Archambault.

The film stars Patrice Robitaille as Marc Côté, a Roman Catholic parish priest who has ministered for many years to the poor and homeless in Montreal but is struggling with the financial decline of his church; after a former family friend bequeaths him a rural property in the Bas-Saint-Laurent region, he decides to take a group of his regular clients on a summer retreat as a respite from their lives, only to run into conflict with the property's longtime caretaker François Riendeau (Sébastien Ricard) and opposition from the community.

The cast also includes Élise Guilbault as Sister Monique, a nun who works with Marc in Montreal; Guy Nadon as Jean-Pierre Genin, a former lawyer who has fallen on hard times; and Martin Dubreuil as Sam, a military veteran struggling with post-traumatic stress disorder; as well as Bruce Dinsmore, Gilbert Sicotte, Louise Turcot, Geneviève Rochette, Justin Leyrolles-Bouchard, Pierre Verville, Marc-André Leclair, Victoria Barkoff, Sylvio Archambault, Cedric Keka Shako, Natalie Tannous, Denis Marchand, Normand Chouinard and Océane Kitura Bohémier-Tootoo in supporting roles.

== Production ==
The film was written by Marie Vien, based in part on her own prior experiences volunteering for a homelessness support organization.

It was shot in summer 2022 in Sainte-Luce near Rimouski.

== Release ==
It premiered in Rimouski on July 4, 2023, before opening commercially on July 14.

== Awards ==
Award	Date of ceremony	Category	Recipient(s)	Result	Ref(s)
Prix Iris	December 10, 2023	Best Supporting Actor	Guy Nadon	Nominated	
Prix Iris	December 10, 2023	Best Supporting Actress	Élise Guilbault	Nominated	
Prix Iris	December 10, 2023	Public Prize	Patrick Roy, Antonello Cozzolino, Brigitte Léveillé, Louise Archambault, Marie Vien	Nominated	
Canadian Screen Awards	May 2024	Best Supporting Performance in a Comedy Film	Marc-André Leclair	Nominated	
Canadian Screen Awards	May 2024	Best Supporting Performance in a Comedy Film	Guy Nadon	Nominated	
Canadian Screen Awards	May 2024	Best Hair	Nermin Grbic, Carole Bertini	Nominated	
Canadian Screen Awards	May 2024	Best Visual Effects	Marie-Claude Lafontaine, Jean-François Ferland, Simon Beaupré	Nominated	
