= Tuesday Morning...Somewhere =

2005 Canadian short film

- French: Mardi matin...quelque part
- Directed by: Hélène Bélanger Martin
- Written by: Geneviève Rochette
- Produced by: Antonello Cozzolino
- Cinematography: Alfonso Maiorana
- Production company: Facteur 7
- Release date: September 22, 2005 (FIFM)
- Running time: 6 minutes
- Country: Canada
- Language: French

Tuesday Morning...Somewhere (French: Mardi matin...quelque part) is a Canadian short drama film, directed by Hélène Bélanger Martin and released in 2005. The film centres on the constantly changing environment of a public transit bus, as passengers board and interact and disembark.

The film premiered in 2005 at the Festival International de Films de Montréal. It received a Genie Award nomination for Best Live Action Short Drama at the 26th Genie Awards in 2006. It won the Prix Coup de cœur at the 2006 Rendez-vous Québec Cinéma.
