= Urban Angel =

- Genre: crime drama
- Starring: Louis Ferreira
- Country of origin: Canada
- No. of seasons: 2
- No. of episodes: 16

Production
- Running time: 60 minutes

Original release
- Network: CBC Television; CBS
- Release: October 29, 1991 – 1993

Urban Angel is a Canadian television crime drama series that aired on CBC Television from 1991 to 1993. Based on the memoirs of real-life Canadian journalist Victor Malarek, the show starred Louis Ferreira (credited as Justin Louis) as Victor Torres, a crusading journalist for the Montreal Tribune.

Although the series was made by the same production firm behind the 1988 film Malarek, for the purposes of the television series they chose to create a fictionalized character rather than portraying the real-life Malarek, both to give them more leeway to write original stories not derived from Malarek's book and because they had selected Ferreira, who is of Portuguese descent and could not believably have portrayed a character with a Ukrainian surname, as the lead actor.

The series aired in the United States as part of CBS's late-night Crimetime After Primetime line up.

The show's cast also included Paula de Vasconcelos, Vittorio Rossi, Dorothée Berryman, Vlasta Vrána, Arthur Grosser, Ellen David, Dean Marshall, Michael Rudder, Macha Grenon and Sophie Lorain.
