= Isabelle Malenfant (editor) =

Isabelle Malenfant (born November 12, 1972) is a Canadian film editor from Quebec. She has been a two-time Jutra/Iris nominee for Best Editing, receiving nods at the 11th Jutra Awards in 2009 for A Sentimental Capitalism (Un capitalisme sentimental) and at the 25th Quebec Cinema Awards in 2023 for The Dishwasher (Le Plongeur), and a Canadian Screen Award nominee for Best Editing at the 12th Canadian Screen Awards in 2024 for The Dishwasher.

== Filmography ==
- A Sentimental Capitalism (Un capitalisme sentimental) - 2008
- Assassin's Creed: Lineage - 2009
- The Hair of the Beast (Le Poil de la bête) - 2010
- Opening Up (M'ouvrir) - 2010
- La Ronde - 2011
- Trotteur - 2011
- Wintergreen (Paparmane) - 2012
- Where I Am (Là où je suis) - 2012
- Mune: Guardian of the Moon (Mune, le gardien de la lune) - 2014
- The Dovekeepers - 2015
- Barefoot at Dawn (Pieds nus dans l'aube) - 2017
- Fabulous (Fabuleuses) - 2019
- Thanks for Everything (Merci pour tout) - 2019
- The Time Thief (L'Arracheuse de temps) - 2021
- The Dishwasher (Le Plongeur) - 2023
- One Summer (Le Temps d'un été) - 2023
- Out Standing (Seule au front) - 2025
- The Furies (Les Furies) - 2025
