= Arnaud Brisebois =

Canadian visual effects and production designer

- Occupation(s): Visual effects, Production designer
- Notable work: The Time Thief, Trotteur
- Awards: Canadian Screen Award for Best Art Direction/Production Design (2022)

Arnaud Brisebois is a Canadian visual effects and production designer. He is most noted for his work on the film The Time Thief (L'Arracheuse de temps), for which he, Jean Babin and Ève Turcotte won the Canadian Screen Award for Best Art Direction/Production Design at the 10th Canadian Screen Awards in 2022.

Brisebois and Francis Leclerc, the director of The Time Thief, previously co-directed the short film Trotteur, which was the winner of the Jutra Award for Best Live Action Short Film at the 14th Jutra Awards in 2012.
