= Ève Turcotte =

Canadian set decorator

Ève Turcotte is a Canadian set decorator. She is most noted for her work on the film The Time Thief (L'Arracheuse de temps), for which she, Jean Babin and Arnaud Brisebois won the Canadian Screen Award for Best Art Direction/Production Design at the 10th Canadian Screen Awards in 2022.
