= Thanks for Everything (2019 film) =

2019 Canadian comedy-drama film

- Film poster
- French: Merci pour tout
- Directed by: Louise Archambault
- Written by: Isabelle Langlois
- Produced by: André Dupuy
- Starring: Julie Perreault; Magalie Lépine-Blondeau
- Cinematography: Yves Bélanger
- Edited by: Isabelle Malenfant
- Music by: Alexis Dumais; Martin Léon
- Production company: Amalga Créations Médias
- Distributed by: Les Films Séville
- Release date: December 25, 2019
- Running time: 81 minutes
- Country: Canada
- Language: French

Thanks for Everything (French: Merci pour tout) is a 2019 Canadian comedy-drama film, directed by Louise Archambault. Her second film to be released in 2019 following And the Birds Rained Down (Il pleuvait des oiseaux), the film stars Julie Perreault and Magalie Lépine-Blondeau as Christine and Marianne Cyr, two estranged sisters who reunite after the death of their father (Gilbert Sicotte), and embark on a road trip to the Magdalen Islands to scatter his ashes.

The film's cast also includes Robin Aubert, Guy Nadon, Patrick Hivon, Jean-François Pichette, Aliocha Schneider and Sasha Migliarese.

The film opened in theatres on December 25, 2019, and was the top-grossing Quebec film in its first week of release. It was nominated for two awards at the 22nd Quebec Cinema Awards, Best Supporting Actor for Aubert and the Public Prize.
