= Marie Vien =

Canadian screenwriter

Marie Vien is a Canadian screenwriter from Quebec. She is most noted as co-writer with Léa Pool of the film The Passion of Augustine (La Passion d'Augustine), for which they received a Prix Iris nomination for Best Screenplay at the 18th Quebec Cinema Awards in 2016.

She subsequently wrote the films 14 Days, 12 Nights (14 jours 12 nuits), Arlette, One Summer (Le temps d'un été), Kaboul, Montréal, and You Will Be Free (Ma fille tu seras libre).
