= Vittorio Rossi =

Canadian screenwriter (born 1961)

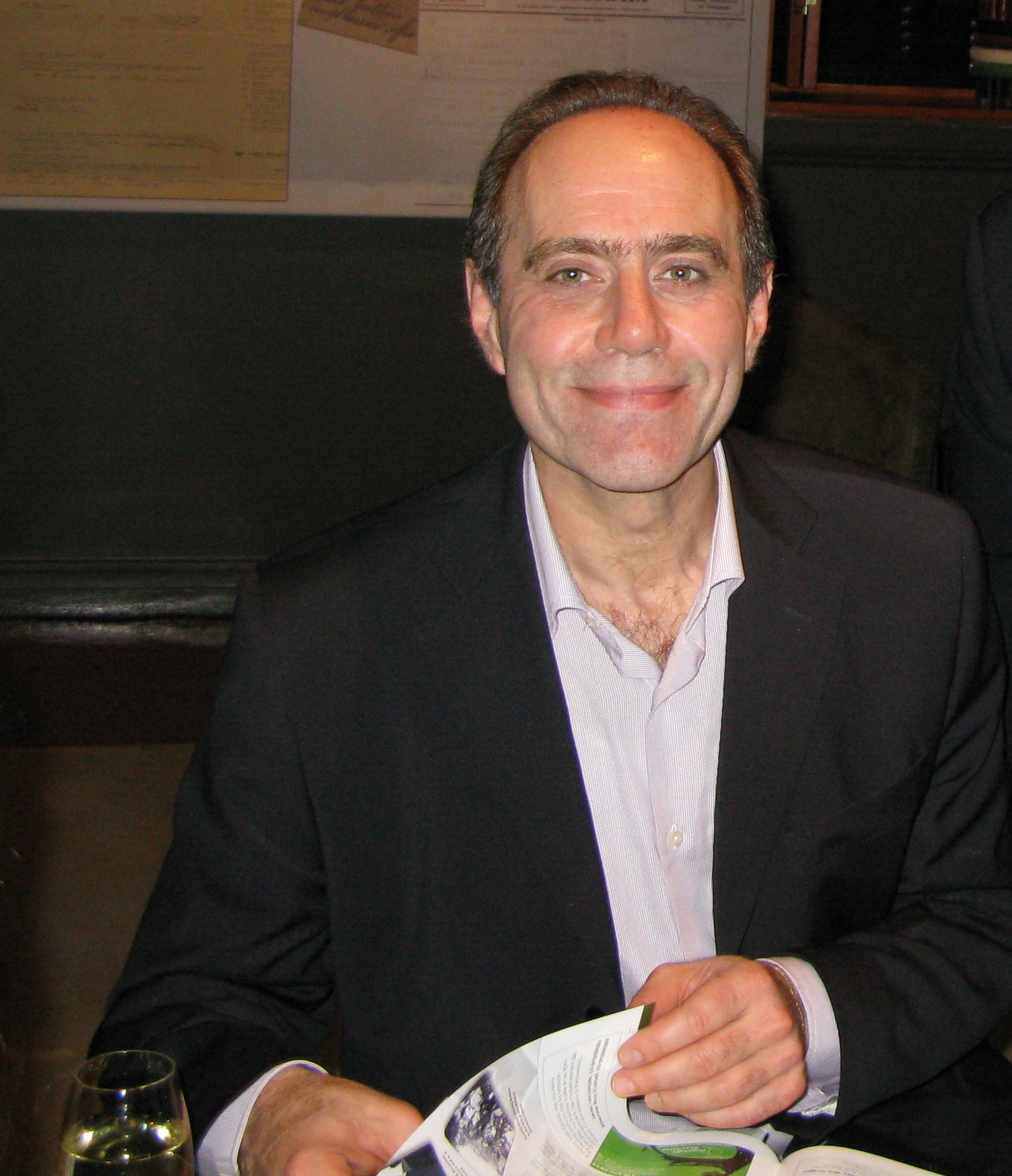
- Mr. Rossi, October 2010
- Born: Vittorio Luciano Rossi; April 16, 1961 (age 65); Montreal, Quebec, Canada
- Occupations: Playwright, Actor, Screenwriter, Director
- Years active: 1986-present

Vittorio Luciano Rossi (born April 16, 1961) is a playwright, actor and screenwriter born in Montreal, Quebec, Canada. He grew up in the district of Ville Emard. Graduating from Concordia University in 1985 with a B.F.A. specializing in theatre performance, Rossi has earned the respect of the national theatre community with his award-winning plays. Mr. Rossi received two consecutive Best New Play Awards at the Quebec Drama Festival in 1986 and 1987 with Little Blood Brother and Backstreets. His plays have been produced in Montreal, Toronto, Ottawa, Vancouver, New York City, Boston, Syracuse and The Stratford Festival in Ontario.

In 1987 Rossi became playwright-in-residence at Montreal's prestigious Centaur Theatre, during which time he wrote his first full-length play, The Chain, which opened Centaur's 20th anniversary season in October 1988. The show was then produced at the National Arts Centre in Ottawa. Other plays include: Scarpone, In Pursuit Of A Cow, The Last Adam, (winner of the Canadian Authors Association Literary Award for Drama in 1996), Love and Other Games, Filumena (Translation), Paradise By The River. In 2006 Vittorio debuted the beginning of what may be his most ambitious work to date, a collection of three plays inspired by the life of his late father entitled A Carpenter’s Trilogy. The three plays include Hellfire Pass (winner of the MECCA Award for Best New Text in 2006), Carmela’s Table (winner of the MECCA Award for Best New Text in 2007), and The Carpenter. His play The Envelope had its World Premiere in March 2015, a production which he also directed. This marked his landmark 10th production at The Centaur Theatre. His latest play Legacy had its World Premiere at The Leonardo Da Vinci Centre in Montreal in June 2022, and was produced by MAGJUSJEN Entertainment, a production he also starred in.

Rossi was Writer-in-Residence at Concordia University in 1990-91 where he also taught playwriting. He is also the recipient of the 1994 Premio Award given by CIBPA (Canadian Italian Business Professionals Association) in the field of Creativity for bringing honour and distinction to the Italian-Canadian community with his body of work. In 2003 Mr. Rossi taught screenwriting at the Université de Sherbrooke.

As an actor, Rossi appeared as a regular as Dino Marrone on Urban Angel and as Detective Tom Celano in the award-winning French-language television series Omertá. His film credits include performances in the CBS Emmy Award-winning Day One, and the critically acclaimed feature Malarek. Rossi was also a co-star in Le Sphinx and acted the lead in the film Canvas starring opposite Gary Busey and John Rhys-Davies. He also co-starred in the feature film The Timekeeper. In his most recent work, he appeared in The Walk directed by Robert Zemeckis. He has written several screenplays and has directed film versions of both Little Blood Brother and The Chain. His plays are published by Talonbooks.

== Plays ==
Vittorio Rossi
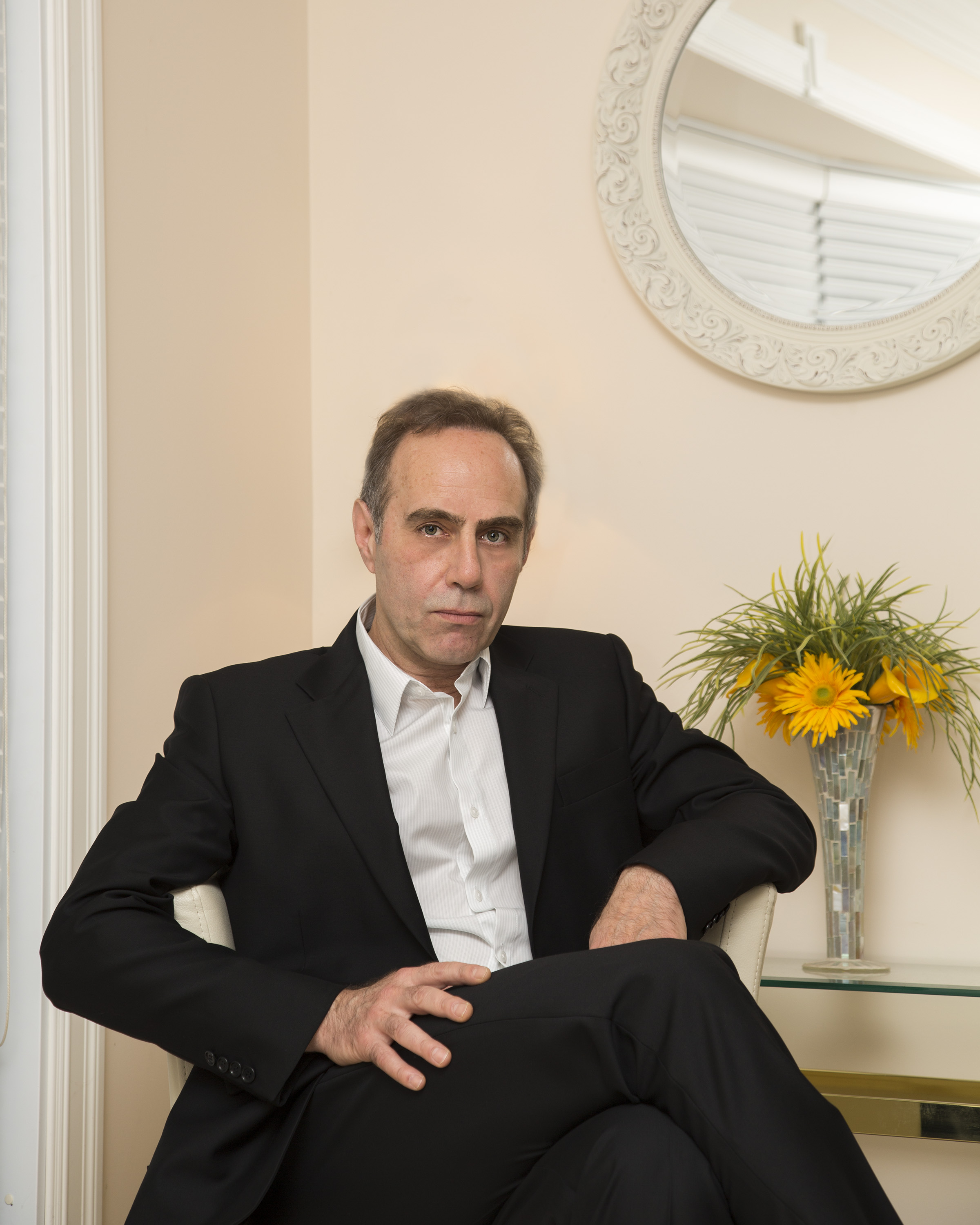
- Mr. Rossi, August 2013

- Legacy (2022)
- The Envelope (2015)
- A Carpenter's Trilogy:
  - The Carpenter (2007)
  - Carmela’s Table (2006)
  - Hellfire Pass (2006)
- Paradise By The River (1998)
- Filumena (Translation) (1997)
- Love and Other Games (1995)
- The Last Adam (1994)
- In Pursuit Of A Cow (1992)
- Scarpone (1990)
- The Chain (1988)
- Backstreets (1987)
- Little Blood Brother (1986)

== Film ==
- The Sphinx (Le Sphinx) (Louis Saia, 1995) (Plays Tony, Pat Carbone's barman.)
- Little Blood Brother (writer/producer/director) filmed in Montreal.
- The Chain (writer/director) filmed in Montreal (2020).
- Legacy (writer/director) filmed in Montreal (2021).

== MAGJUSJEN Entertainment ==
A Montreal based entertainment company founded on June 28, 2018 by Barry F. Lorenzetti and Vittorio Rossi. The name comes from the first three letters of Mr. Lorenzetti’s three children, Maggie, Justin, and Jenna. Barry is the Executive Producer of the company, and Vittorio is the Artistic Director.
