= Louise Archambault =

Canadian film director and screenwriter

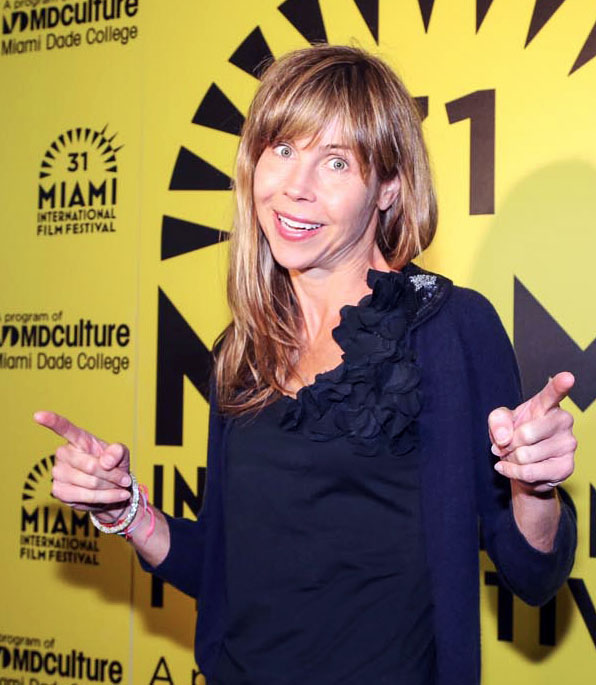
- Archambault at the Miami International Film Festival
- Born: Montreal
- Occupation: Director
- Years active: 1990-present

Louise Archambault is a Quebecois film and television director and screenwriter. She is best known for her films Familia, which won the Claude Jutra Award in 2005, and Gabrielle, which won the Canadian Screen Award for Best Picture in 2014.

Archambault has directed numerous short films, including Atomic Saké, Lock, Petite Mort and Kluane. Her film Gabrielle was screened in the Special Presentation section at the 2013 Toronto International Film Festival, and won two Canadian Screen Awards at the 2nd Canadian Screen Awards, for Best Picture and Best Actress for star Gabrielle Marion-Rivard.

Her third feature film And the Birds Rained Down, an adaptation of Jocelyne Saucier's novel Il pleuvait des oiseaux, was released in 2019. Her fourth film, Thanks for Everything (Merci pour tout), followed later the same year. and One Summer (Le temps d'un été) was released in 2023. In 2023 she also released Irena's Vow, her first English-language film. The feature tells a story of a former nurse who shelters a dozen Jews in Nazi-occupied Poland.

Archambault is a graduate of Concordia University in Montreal (BFA 93, MFA 00).

== Filmography ==
Short film

Year	Title	Director	Writer
1999	Atomic Saké	Yes	Yes
2010	Lock	Yes	Yes
2012	Petite mort	Yes	No

Feature film

Year	Title	Director	Writer
2005	Familia	Yes	Yes
2013	Gabrielle	Yes	Yes
2019	And the Birds Rained Down	Yes	Yes
2019	Thanks for Everything	Yes	Yes
2023	One Summer	Yes	No
2023	Irena's Vow	Yes	No

Television

Year	Title	Notes
2013	La galère	3 episodes
2015	Nouvelle adresse	3 episodes
2015	This Life	4 episodes
2017	Catastrophe	6 episodes
2017–2019	Trop	21 episodes
2021	Survivre à ses enfants	13 episodes
2022	Be Mine, Valentine	Television film
2022	The Bad Seed Returns	Television film

== Awards and nominations ==
Year	Title	Award/Nomination
1999	Atomic Saké	Nominated — Prix Iris for Best Short Film
2005	Familia	Toronto International Film Festival Award for Best Canadian Short Film; Genie Award Claude Jutra Award; Nominated — Canadian Screen Award for Best Director; Nominated — Canadian Screen Award for Best Screenplay; Nominated — Palm Springs International Film Festival; Nominated — Taipei Film Festival Grand Prize; Nominated — Jeonju International Film Festival Indie Vision
2013	Gabrielle	Prix Iris for Best Director; Prix Iris for Best Screenplay; Locarno Film Festival Audience Award; Festival International du Film Francophone de Namur Audience Award; Windsor International Film Festival People's Choice Award; Nominated — Toronto International Film Festival Award for Best Canadian Film; Nominated — Gijón International Film Festival Grand Prix Asturias; Nominated — Lumière Award for Best French-Language Film; Nominated — Vancouver Film Critics Circle Award for Best Director of a Canadian Film; Nominated — Special Jury Prize (Locarno International Film Festival); Nominated — Golden Leopard; Nominated — Rogers Best Canadian Film Award; Nominated — International Festival of Independent Cinema Off Camera Best Feature Film
2019	And the Birds Rained Down	Gothenburg Film Festival Dragon Award Best International Film; Victoria Film Festival Best Canadian Feature; Nominated — Toronto International Film Festival Award for Best Canadian Film; Nominated — Canadian Screen Award for Best Screenplay; Nominated — Prix Iris for Best Screenplay; Nominated — Golden Shell; Nominated — Miami International Film Festival Knight Marimbas Award; Nominated — Windsor International Film Festival Prize in Canadian Film; Nominated — Quebec City Film Festival Grand Prize
2023	One Summer	Nominated — Windsor International Film Festival Prize in Canadian Film
2023	Irena's Vow	Vancouver International Film Festival Audience Award; Windsor International Film Festival People's Choice Award; Nominated — Windsor International Film Festival Prize in Canadian Film
