= Johanne-Marie Tremblay =

Canadian actress (born 1950)

- Born: 1950 (age 75–76); Montreal, Quebec
- Occupation: Actress

Johanne-Marie Tremblay (born 1950) is a Canadian actress.

She had her first film role in the 1988 Straight for the Heart, after which she was discovered by director Denys Arcand and cast as the character Constance in Jesus of Montreal (1989). Tremblay was nominated for the Genie Award for Best Supporting Actress for the role.

Afterwards, Tremblay became a star in Quebec television, with roles in Les Filles de Caleb and La Sorcière in the 1990s. She reprised her role as Constance in Arcand's later films The Barbarian Invasions (2003) and Days of Darkness (2007). In 2009, she appeared in Denis Villeneuve's film Polytechnique, and in 2013 acted in Sébastien Pilote's The Dismantling. In 2018, she had a voice role in the animated film Ville Neuve.
