= Francis Leclerc =

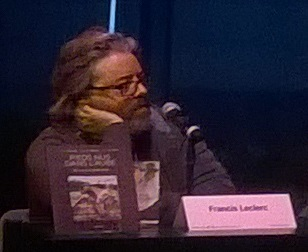
- Born: 1971 (age 54–55); Quebec City, Quebec
- Occupation: film director
- Years active: 2000s-present
- Notable work: Looking for Alexander, Barefoot at Dawn

Francis Leclerc (born 1971 in Quebec City) is a Canadian film and television director, screenwriter and film editor. He is the son of Félix Leclerc. Since 1995 he has worked in the Quebec film industry, directing music videos for many well-known Quebec artists. He has directed more than 20 short and medium-length films, including a television adaptation of Robert Lepage’s Les Sept branches de la rivière Ota. He directed and co-wrote his critically acclaimed debut feature, A Girl at the Window (Une jeune fille à la fenêtre), in 2001. His second feature, Looking for Alexander (Mémoires affectives), a nuanced and mature work about lost memory and childhood tragedy, secured him Genie Awards for best director and screenplay as well as the Prix Jutra for direction.

His film Barefoot at Dawn (Pieds nus dans l'aube), an adaptation of his father's semi-autobiographical novel of the same name, was released in 2017.

In 2018, he was the patron and curator of the Festival Vues dans la tête de... film festival in Rivière-du-Loup.

== Filmography ==
- A Girl at the Window (Une jeune fille à la fenêtre) – 2001
- Looking for Alexander (Mémoires affectives) – 2004
- Marie-Antoinette, la véritable histoire – 2006
- A No-Hit No-Run Summer (Un été sans point ni coup sûr) – 2008
- Trotteur – 2011
- Barefoot at Dawn (Pieds nus dans l'aube) – 2017
- The Time Thief (L'Arracheuse de temps) – 2021
- The Dishwasher (Le Plongeur) – 2023

== Recognition ==
- 2005 Genie Award for Best Achievement in Direction – Looking for Alexander – Won
- 2005 Genie Award for Best Original Screenplay – Looking for Alexander – Nominated (shared with Marcel Beaulieu)
- 2005 Jutra Award for Best Direction (Meilleure Réalisation) – Looking for Alexander – Won
- 2005 Jutra Award for Best Screenplay (Meilleur Scénario) – Looking for Alexander – Nominated (shared with Marcel Beaulieu)
- 2001 Montreal World Film Festival Grand Prix des Amériques – A Girl at the Window – Nominated
