= Target Number One =

Canadian crime drama film

- Theatrical release poster
- Directed by: Daniel Roby
- Written by: Daniel Roby
- Produced by: Valérie d'Auteuil; André Rouleau
- Starring: Antoine Olivier Pilon; Stephen McHattie; Don McKellar; J. C. MacKenzie; Amanda Crew; Jim Gaffigan; Josh Hartnett
- Cinematography: Ronald Plante
- Edited by: Yvann Thibaudeau
- Music by: Eloi Painchaud; Jorane; Jean-Phi Goncalves
- Production companies: Caramel Films; Highland Film Group; Goldrush Entertainment
- Distributed by: Les Films Séville
- Release date: July 10, 2020
- Running time: 125 minutes
- Country: Canada
- Language: English
- Budget: $7 million
- Box office: $138,000

Target Number One (released as Most Wanted in the United States, Suspect numéro un in Quebec) is a 2020 Canadian crime drama film directed by Daniel Roby. Based on the true story of Alain Olivier, a Canadian drug addict from Quebec who spent eight years in prison in Thailand in the 1980s after having been set up as an unwitting pawn in an espionage plot by the Canadian Security Intelligence Service, the film stars Josh Hartnett as Canadian investigative journalist Victor Malarek, investigating the arrest of drug addict Daniel Léger (Antoine Olivier Pilon). The film's cast also includes Jim Gaffigan, Stephen McHattie, Don McKellar, J.C. MacKenzie, and Amanda Crew.

The film was theatrically released in Canada on July 10, 2020, and on video on demand services in the United States on July 24, 2020.

== Plot ==
In 1989, Canadian journalist Victor Malarek investigates the circumstances surrounding the suspicious arrest of Daniel Léger, a 25-year-old heroin addict serving time in a prison in Thailand and facing the death penalty.

Malarek is a dedicated investigative journalist working for The Globe and Mail newspaper who is being pressured by his boss to move to writing weekly feature articles. He comes across the strange case of a Canadian citizen under arrest in Thailand after a joint investigation by Canadian and Thai authorities, in which Léger is identified as a mastermind in the drug trafficking trade. Malarek's interest is piqued when he queries a few details with the Canadian authorities and receives push back. He decides to dig deeper and uncovers some worrying items about the case. He brings the case to his editor Art with a view to doing a piece. Art reluctantly agrees to let Malarek visit Thailand to interview the Thai authorities and Léger.

The film then splits and introduces Daniel Léger, shown to be little more than a drug addict who unwittingly took a job with dealer Glen Picker. Picker befriends the naïve Léger and offers to let him stay and work for him, all the while intending to set up Léger for a pay-off from the Canadian police narcotics division. He identifies Léger as a major player in the Thai drug world and indicates that Léger can organize a major shipment of heroin to be smuggled to Canada. The narcotics police, in need of a major morale-boosting drug seizure, fall for Picker's scam. The lead detective, Frank Cooper, makes an egregious error while reviewing Léger's file and mistakes him for another criminal with a detailed criminal history.

Picker manipulates Léger into meeting with Detective Cooper under the guise of a favor and believes the ruse that Cooper is a drug smuggler. The narcotics operation hits a snag when it's uncovered that Léger is nervous to travel to Thailand, and he has had his passport withheld. The Canadian police arrange for Léger's passport to be issued and pay for the young man's flights, hotels and expenses in Thailand. Léger, left with no other options, travels to Thailand and tries to put together a drug buy but can only find a Tuk Tuk driver who can get two kilos of heroin. The Canadian police agree to the deal but it goes awry.

Léger turns up with Cooper, who is working undercover, and the suppliers arrive separately. There is a struggle, and in the chaos that ensues, Detective Cooper shoots his son Al Cooper fatally. The drug suppliers are arrested, alongside Léger, and taken to a Thai prison.

Malarek meets with and interviews Léger, uncovering the aforementioned details. Upon leaving the prison, Malarek shouts to Léger to plead guilty, as he will likely be found guilty and given the death penalty otherwise. At the trial, Léger is unable to understand the proceedings. Detective Cooper testifies falsely that Léger is a hardened criminal with a long list of convictions in Canada. Léger pleads his innocence, but once he has been found guilty, he alters his plea to guilty and receives a 100-year sentence.

In Canada, Malarek is feeling pressure to proceed with the investigation. He loses his job at The Globe and Mail and on TV and his wife leaves him due to the pressure. A last ray of hope is offered when Malarek's article is read by the newly formed ethics investigation department, who review Léger's case and petition him to respond.

The film concludes with Léger's release from a Thailand prison, where he kicked his addiction. He then educates himself in the Thai judicial system and, after serving eight years, manages to get a prison transfer. Malarek meets him at the airport, where it is revealed that both of Léger's parents have passed, but it is shown that Léger maintains a positive outlook and is practicing Buddhism.

Cooper and his fellow officers received commendations, and the investigation into their handling of the Léger case was watered down, while Malarek returns to investigative journalism.

== Cast ==
- Antoine Olivier Pilon as Daniel Léger
- Jim Gaffigan as Picker
- Josh Hartnett as Victor Malarek
- Stephen McHattie as Frank Cooper
- Cory Lipman as Al Cooper
- Don McKellar as Norm
- J. C. MacKenzie as Arthur
- Amanda Crew as Anna Malarek

== Production ==
Daniel Roby began his first research soon after concluding production of his 2007 debut film White Skin, and wrote the first draft of the script concurrently with his 2011 film Funkytown. However, he had difficulty attracting enough funding to make the film; although he took payment for the screenplay, he reinvested his directorial salary, as did the film's producers, into the film to keep it under its $7 million budget. To prepare the script, Roby attended the actual trials of Alain Olivier, flew to Thailand to interview witnesses, and read documents about the case. At one point he found an investor, had assembled a cast, and began pre-production, only to have the investor pull out.

The film finally entered production in June 2018 under the working title Gut Instinct, and was retitled Target Number One during the production process.

== Reception ==
=== Box office ===
The film made an estimated $138,000 from 72 theaters in its Canadian opening weekend.

=== Critical response ===
On review aggregator Rotten Tomatoes, the film holds an approval rating of 72% based on 39 reviews, with an average rating of 6.6/10. The website's critics consensus reads, "Although it suffers in comparison to similar suspense thrillers, Most Wanted benefits from solid casting and a taut, intelligent storytelling approach." On Metacritic, the film has a weighted average score of 62 out of 100, based on seven critics, indicating "generally favorable reviews".

Chris Knight of the National Post rated the film three stars out of five, writing that "The story, mostly devoid of car chases and gunfire except in one key scene, may strike some as a little dour, a touch too Canadian, and Target Number One's fate outside our borders remains to be seen. But it's a crafty crime thriller, a rough-and-ready Heritage Minute given room to bloom into something worthy of its feature length. Run it up the flagpole, I say."
