= 25th Quebec Cinema Awards =

Awards show for Quebecois cinema in 2022

The 25th Quebec Cinema Awards were held on December 10, 2023, to honour achievements in the Cinema of Quebec in 2022 and 2023. The ceremony was broadcast by Noovo, and hosted by Jay Du Temple.

The artisans' gala, presenting the awards in technical and craft categories, was held on December 7 and hosted by actress Fabiola Nyrva Aladin.

The awards were delayed from their traditional June scheduling after Ici Radio-Canada Télé, which had been the ceremony's broadcaster since 2003, announced in fall 2022 that due to declining ratings in recent years, it would not televise the 2023 awards, and was instead planning alternative ways to highlight Quebec film in its programming.

In February 2023, Québec Cinéma indicated that it was in negotiations with other broadcasters to carry the 2023 awards. In May 2023, by which time the nominees would ordinarily have been announced, the organization confirmed only that the ceremony would not take place in its usual June scheduling. The broadcast deal with Noovo, and the awards' scheduling in December, were announced in July.

Due to the scheduling change, the awards covered a longer qualifying period than usual, with films eligible for submission if they were released between March 6, 2022, and August 31, 2023.

== Overview of nominations ==
Nominees were announced on November 14. It was the first time that four films received twelve or more nominations, with Viking receiving a leading eighteen nominations, a new record. For his performances in both Viking and Babysitter, Steve Laplante became the eighth performer and fifth actor to receive two acting nominations during the same ceremony. Luc Picard received his tenth acting nomination for his role in his film Confessions of a Hitman (Confessions), competing for Best Actor against his son Henri Picard for his role in The Dishwasher (Le plongeur).

The Iris Tribute was given to actor and host of the 1st and 15th Jutra Awards Rémy Girard. Girard had previously received two Best Actor and five Best Supporting Actor nominations, but had never won a competitive award, making him the actor with the most nominations without a win.

Viking won eleven awards, including Best Film, Best Director, Best Screenplay and Best Actor for Steve Laplante. It became only the second film to win more than ten awards after C.R.A.Z.Y.. Babysitter received fourteen nominations but went home empty handed, tying the record with The Rocket (Maurice Richard) for most nominations without a win.

Red Rooms (Les chambres rouges) received thirteen nominations and won two acting awards: Best Supporting Actress for Laurie Babin and Revelation of the Year for Juliette Gariépy, while The Dishwasher (Le plongeur) received twelve nominations with Charles-Aubey Houde winning Best Supporting Actor. For her performance in Noemie Says Yes (Noémie dit oui), Best Actress winner Kelly Depeault received her second acting award, having previously won Revelation of the Year for Goddess of the Fireflies (La déesse des mouches à feu).

== Nominees and winners ==
Best Film	Best Director
Viking — Luc Déry, Kim McCraw; Babysitter — Martin Paul-Hus, Catherine Léger, Pierre-Marcel Blanchot, Fabrice Lambot; The Dishwasher (Le plongeur) — Marie-Claude Poulin; Falcon Lake — Nancy Grant, Sylvain Corbeil, Dany Boon, Jalil Lespert, Julien Deris, David Gauquié, Jean-Luc Ormières; Family Game (Arsenault et fils) — Stéphanie Morissette, Charles Stéphane Roy; Noemie Says Yes (Noémie dit oui) — Patricia Bergeron; Red Rooms (Les chambres rouges) — Dominique Dussault	Stéphane Lafleur, Viking; Monia Chokri, Babysitter; Francis Leclerc, The Dishwasher (Le plongeur); Rafaël Ouellet, Family Game (Arsenault et fils); Pascal Plante, Red Rooms (Les chambres rouges)
Best Actor	Best Actress
Steve Laplante, Viking; Guillaume Cyr, Family Game (Arsenault et fils); Patrick Hivon, Babysitter; Henri Picard, The Dishwasher (Le plongeur); Luc Picard, Confessions of a Hitman (Confessions)	Kelly Depeault, Noemie Says Yes (Noémie dit oui); Larissa Corriveau, Viking; Hélène Florent, A Respectable Woman (Une femme respectable); Léane Labrèche-Dor, My Mother's Men (Les hommes de ma mère); Sara Montpetit, Falcon Lake
Best Supporting Actor	Best Supporting Actress
Charles-Aubey Houde, The Dishwasher (Le plongeur); Maxime de Cotret, The Dishwasher (Le plongeur); Denis Houle, Viking; Steve Laplante, Babysitter; Guy Nadon, One Summer (Le temps d'un été)	Laurie Babin, Red Rooms (Les chambres rouges); Élise Guilbault, One Summer (Le temps d'un été); Ève Landry, Bungalow; Julie Le Breton, You Will Remember Me (Tu te souviendras de moi); Nadia Tereszkiewicz, Babysitter
Revelation of the Year	Best Screenplay
Juliette Gariépy, Red Rooms (Les chambres rouges); Fabiola Nyrva Aladin, Viking; Émi Chicoine, Noemie Says Yes (Noémie dit oui); Virginie Fortin, Two Days Before Christmas (23 décembre); Joan Hart, The Dishwasher (Le plongeur); François Pérusse, Niagara	Stéphane Lafleur and Eric K. Boulianne, Viking; Eric K. Boulianne and Francis Leclerc, The Dishwasher (Le plongeur); Catherine Léger, Babysitter; Rafaël Ouellet, Family Game (Arsenault et fils); Pascal Plante, Red Rooms (Les chambres rouges)
Best Documentary	Best Short Documentary
Dear Audrey — Jeremiah Hayes, André Barro, Annette Clarke; Backlash: Misogyny in the Digital Age (Je vous salue salope: La misogynie au temps du numérique) — Léa Clermont-Dion, Guylaine Maroist, Éric Ruel; Gabor — Joannie Lafrenière, Line Sander Egede; Geographies of Solitude — Jacquelyn Mills, Rosalie Chicoine Perreault; Rojek — Zaynê Akyol, Sylvain Corbeil, Audrey-Ann Dupuis-Pierre	About Memory and Loss (Notes sur la mémoire et l'oubli) — Amélie Hardy, Isabelle Grignon-Francke; Belle River — Guillaume Fournier, Samuel Matteau, Yannick Nolin, Jean-Pierre Vézina; Fire-Jo-Ball — Audrey Nantel-Gagnon, Nathalie Cloutier; Oasis — Justine Martin, Louis-Emmanuel Gagné-Brochu; Zug Island — Guillaume Collin, Nicolas Lachapelle
Best Live Action Short Film	Best Animated Short Film
Invincible — Vincent René-Lortie, Élise Lardinois, Samuel Caron; Blond Night (Nuit blonde) — Gabrielle Demers, Nellie Carrier; Nanitic — Carol Nguyen, Marie Lytwynuk; No Ghost in the Morgue — Marilyn Cooke, Kélyna N. Lauzier, Macha Houssart; Simo — Aziz Zoromba, Rosalie Chicoine Perreault	Madeleine — Raquel Sancinetti; Harvey — Janice Nadeau, Reginald de Guillebon, Pierre Méloni, Marc Bertrand, Christine Noël, Julie Roy; Marie. Eduardo. Sophie. — Thomas Corriveau; A Night for the Dogs — Max Woodward, Guillaume Dubois, Camille Lequenne; Triangle of Darkness (Triangle noir) — Marie-Noëlle Moreau Robidas, Nicolas Dufour-Laperrière
Best Art Direction	Best Costume Design
André-Line Beauparlant, Viking; Sylvie Desmarais, Bungalow; Mathieu Lemay, The Dishwasher (Le plongeur); Laura Nhem, Red Rooms (Les chambres rouges); Colombe Raby, Babysitter	Sophie Lefebvre, Viking; Mariane Carter, Victoire (La cordonnière); Guillaume Laflamme, Babysitter; Sophie Lefebvre, A Respectable Woman (Une femme respectable); Annabelle Roy and Delphine Gagné, Farador
Best Cinematography	Best Cinematography in a Documentary
Sara Mishara, Viking; Steve Asselin, The Dishwasher (Le plongeur); Vincent Biron, Red Rooms (Les chambres rouges); Kristof Brandl, Falcon Lake; Josée Deshaies, Babysitter	Jacquelyn Mills, Geographies of Solitude; Geoffroy Beauchemin, Humus; Nicolas Canniccioni and Arshia Shakiba, Rojek; Joannie Lafrenière, Gabor; Maude Plante-Husaruk, Far Beyond the Pasturelands (Au-delà des hautes vallées)
Best Editing	Best Editing in a Documentary
Sophie Leblond, Viking; Pauline Gaillard, Babysitter; Myriam Magassouba, Family Game (Arsenault et fils); Jonah Malak, Red Rooms (Les chambres rouges); Isabelle Malenfant, The Dishwasher (Le plongeur)	Jeremiah Hayes, Dear Audrey; Mathieu Bouchard-Malo, Rojek; Emmanuelle Lane, Gabor; Jacquelyn Mills, Geographies of Solitude; Oana Suteu Khintirian, Beyond Paper (Au-delà du papier)
Best Original Music	Best Original Music in a Documentary
Daniel Bélanger, Confessions of a Hitman (Confessions); Viviane Audet, Robin-Joël Cool and Alexis Martin, Family Game (Arsenault et fils); Christophe Lamarche-Ledoux and Mathieu Charbonneau, Viking; Martin Léon, You Will Remember Me (Tu te souviendras de moi); Dominique Plante, Red Rooms (Les chambres rouges)	Daniel Baillargeon, Gabor; Olivier Alary and Johannes Malfatti, Twice Colonized; Walker Grimshaw, Dear Audrey; Maxime Lacoste-Lebuis, Far Beyond the Pasturelands (Au-delà des hautes vallées); Delphine Measroch, Humus
Best Sound	Best Sound in a Documentary
Sylvain Bellemare, Bernard Gariépy Strobl and Pierre Bertrand, Viking; Olivier Calvert, Luc Boudrias and Yann Cleary, The Dishwasher (Le plongeur); Olivier Calvert, Stéphane Bergeron and Martyne Morin, Red Rooms (Les chambres rouges); Stephen De Oliveira, Séverin Favriau and Stéphane Thiébaut, Falcon Lake; Daniel Fontaine-Bégin, Luc Boudrias and Henry Godding Jr., Family Game (Arsenault et fils)	Andreas Mendritzki and Jacquelyn Mills, Geographies of Solitude; Mélanie Gauthier, Jeremiah Hayes and Isabelle Lussier, Dear Audrey; Maxime Lacoste-Lebuis, Eric Shaw and Jean Paul Vialard, Far Beyond the Pasturelands (Au-delà des hautes vallées); Jean-François Sauvé, Martin M. Messier and Bruno Pucella, 305 Bellechasse; Catherine Van Der Donckt and Jean Paul Vialard, Beyond Paper (Au-delà du papier)
Best Hairstyling	Best Makeup
Richard Hansen, Réjean Forget and Johanne Hansen, Victoire (La cordonnière); Vincent Dufault, Viking; André Duval, A Respectable Woman (Une femme respectable); Nermin Grbic, Red Rooms (Les chambres rouges); Ann-Louise Landry, Babysitter	Lyne Tremblay, Faustina De Sousa, François Gauthier and Michael Loncin, Farador; Kathryn Casault and Bruno Gatien, Confessions of a Hitman (Confessions); Marie-Josée Galibert, Viking; Marie Salvado, Red Rooms (Les chambres rouges); Adriana Verbert, Babysitter
Best Visual Effects	Best Casting
Marie-Claude Lafontaine and Simon Beaupré, Viking; Marc Hall, Babysitter; Marc Hall, Farador; Marc Hall, Victoire (La cordonnière); Mathilde Vézina-Bouchard, Mistral Spatial	Lucie Robitaille and Dandy Thibaudeau, Viking; Nathalie Boutrie, Family Game (Arsenault et fils); Marilou Richer, Red Rooms (Les chambres rouges); Annie St-Pierre and Antoinette Boulat, Babysitter; Brigitte Viau, The Dishwasher (Le plongeur)
Most Successful Film Outside Quebec	Public Prize
Falcon Lake; Dounia and the Princess of Aleppo (Dounia et la princesse d’Alep); Katak: The Brave Beluga (Katak le brave béluga); This House (Cette maison); Viking	My Mother's Men (Les hommes de ma mère); Confessions of a Hitman (Confessions); Katak: The Brave Beluga (Katak le brave béluga); One Summer (Le temps d'un été); Two Days Before Christmas (23 décembre)
Best First Film	Iris Tribute
Falcon Lake — Charlotte Le Bon; Farador — Édouard Albernhe Tremblay; My Mother's Men (Les hommes de ma mère) — Anik Jean; Noemie Says Yes (Noémie dit oui) — Geneviève Albert; Rodeo (Rodéo) — Joëlle Desjardins Paquette	Rémy Girard

== Multiple wins and nominations ==
=== Films with multiple nominations ===
Nominations	Film
18	Viking
14	Babysitter
13	Red Rooms (Les chambres rouges)
12	The Dishwasher (Le plongeur)
8	Family Game (Arsenault et fils)
6	Falcon Lake
4	Confessions of a Hitman (Confessions)
4	Dear Audrey
4	Farador
4	Gabor
4	Geographies of Solitude
4	Noemie Says Yes (Noémie dit oui)
3	Far Beyond the Pasturelands (Au-delà des hautes vallées)
3	My Mother's Men (Les hommes de ma mère)
3	One Summer (Le temps d'un été)
3	A Respectable Woman (Une femme respectable)
3	Rojek
3	Victoire (La cordonnière)
2	Beyond Paper (Au-delà du papier)
2	Bungalow
2	Humus
2	Katak: The Brave Beluga (Katak le brave béluga)
2	Two Days Before Christmas (23 décembre)
2	You Will Remember Me (Tu te souviendras de moi)

=== Films with multiple wins ===
Wins	Film
11	Viking
2	Dear Audrey
2	Falcon Lake
2	Geographies of Solitude
2	Red Rooms (Les chambres rouges)
