= Nathalie Cloutier =

Canadian film producer

Nathalie Cloutier is a Canadian film producer, associated with the National Film Board of Canada. The executive producer of the French and Eastern Canadian documentary units, she has been a recipient of several Canadian Screen Award and Prix Iris nominations for her work.

She began her career as a competitor in the 1998-99 season of La Course destination monde.

== Filmography ==
- Yvon Deschamps - 2011
- Ariel - 2013
- Jean Pierre Lefebvre - 2013
- The Wind at My Door (Il ventait devant ma porte) - 2014
- The Wanted 18 - 2014
- Anatomie - 2014
- The Amina Profile (Le profil Amina) - 2015
- Hell Runs on Gasoline! (L'enfer marche au gaz!) - 2015
- Interview with a Free Man (Entrevue avec un homme libre) - 2015
- À la plage - 2015
- World of Passage (Ces hommes de passage) - 2015
- Gulîstan, Land of Roses (Gulîstan, terre de roses) - 2016
- Waseskun - 2016
- Labrecque, une caméra pour la mémoire - 2017
- Orteils talons orteils talons - 2018
- Daughter of the Crater (La fille du cratère) - 2019
- White Noise (Le Fond de l'air) - 2019
- Kenbe la, Until We Win (Kenbe la, jusqu'à la victoire) - 2019
- Gatherings (Ramaillages) - 2020
- Into the Light - 2020
- Sometimes I Wish I Was on a Desert Island (Y’a des fois où j’aimerais me trouver sur une île déserte) - 2020
- Far from Bashar (Loin de Bachar) - 2020
- Star Wars Kid: The Rise of the Digital Shadows (Dans l'ombre du Star Wars Kid) - 2022
- Waiting for Raif (En attendant Raif) - 2022
- The Secret Order (L'Order secret) - 2022
- Unspoken Tears - 2022
- North Star (Étoile du nord) - 2023
- The Geographies of DAR - 2023
- Fire-Jo-Ball - 2023
- Afterwards (Après-coups) - 2023
- Beyond Paper (Au-delà du papier) - 2023
- Malartic - 2024
- Living Together (Cohabiter) - 2024
- Ghosts of the Sea (Les Enfants du large) - 2024
- Ninan Auassat: We, the Children - 2024
- Work Different (Travailler autrement) - 2024

== Awards ==
Award	Year	Category	Work	Result	Ref(s)
Canadian Screen Awards	2016	Best Feature Length Documentary	The Amina Profile (Le profil Amina) (with Isabelle Couture, Hugo Latulippe, Michel St-Cyr, Guy Villeneuve, Colette Loumède)	Nominated	
Canadian Screen Awards	2017	Best Feature Length Documentary	Waseskun (with Steve Patry, Denis McCready, Colette Loumède)	Nominated	
Canadian Screen Awards	2024	Best Feature Length Documentary	Beyond Paper (Au-delà du papier) (with Oana Suteu Khintirian)	Nominated	
Canadian Screen Awards	2025	Best Short Documentary	Afterwards (Après-coups) (with Romane Garant Chartrand)	Nominated	
Prix Iris	2015	Best Live Action Short Film	Anatomie (with Patrick Bossé, Catherine Chagnon)	Nominated	
Prix Iris	2016	Best Documentary Film	The Amina Profile (Le profil Amina) (with Isabelle Couture, Sophie Deraspe)	Nominated	
Prix Iris	2017	Best Documentary Film	Gulîstan, Land of Roses (Gulîstan, terre de roses) (with Zaynê Akyol, Mehmet Aktaş, Fanny Drew, Yanick Létourneau, Sarah Mannering, Denis McCready)	Nominated	
Prix Iris	2023	Best Short Documentary	Fire-Jo-Ball (with Audrey Nantel-Gagnon)	Nominated	
Prix Iris	2024	Best Short Documentary	Afterwards (Après-coups) (with Romane Garant Chartrand)	Nominated	
