= The Furies (2025 film) =

2025 Canadian drama film

- French: Les Furies
- Directed by: Mélanie Charbonneau
- Written by: Gabrielle Côté
- Produced by: Émilie Beaulieu; Sarah Châtelain; Stéphanie Pages
- Starring: Gabrielle Côté; France Castel; Anne-Élisabeth Bossé
- Cinematography: Ariel Méthot
- Edited by: Isabelle Malenfant; Matthieu Bouchard
- Music by: Antoine Rochette
- Production company: Écho Média
- Distributed by: Immina Films
- Release date: November 19, 2025
- Running time: 107 minutes
- Country: Canada
- Language: French

The Furies (French: Les Furies) is a Canadian sports comedy film, directed by Mélanie Charbonneau and released in 2025. The first comedy film ever made in Quebec to focus on women's sports instead of men's, the film stars Gabrielle Côté as Mélissa, a young woman from Waterloo, Quebec, who enlists the help of retired roller derby star Yvette (France Castel) to set up a roller derby team after the women's sports programs are evicted from the local arena due to the imminent arrival of a new semi-professional men's ice hockey team.

The cast also includes Anne-Élisabeth Bossé, Juliette Gosselin, Aurélia Arandi-Longpré, Debbie Lynch-White, Nathalie Doummar, Sandrine Bisson, Antoine Bertrand, Antoine Pilon, Maxime de Cotret and Lyraël Dauphin in supporting roles.

Côté was the writer of the film's screenplay. The film was shot in spring 2025 in Montreal and Waterloo.

The film premiered theatrically on November 19, 2025, at Montreal's Place des Arts, in advance of its commercial release on November 28.

France Castel received a Canadian Screen Award nomination for Best Lead Performance in a Comedy Film at the 14th Canadian Screen Awards in 2026.
