= Maxime Lacoste-Lebuis =

Canadian composer and filmmaker

Maxime Lacoste-Lebuis, also known online as Max LL is a Canadian composer and filmmaker, who works principally in collaboration with his long-term partner Maude Plante-Husaruk.

They are most noted for the 2016 short film The Botanist, which was named to the Toronto International Film Festival's annual year-end Canada's Top Ten list for 2017, and the 2021 feature documentary film Far Beyond the Pasturelands (Au-delà des hautes vallées), for which Lacoste-Lebuis received Prix Iris nominations for Best Original Music in a Documentary and Best Sound in a Documentary at the 25th Quebec Cinema Awards in 2023.

His other credits as a composer have included the video games Jotun, Sundered, Spiritfarer, 33 Immortals, At Fate's End, all of which were developed by indie developer Thunder Lotus Games, and the film To Live and Die and Live.
