= Malartic =

Malartic may refer to:

- Anne Joseph Hippolyte de Maurès, Comte de Malartic, a French colonial governor and general in Canada and Mauritius
- Malartic, Quebec, a town on the Malartic River in northwestern Quebec, Canada
- Malartic (film), a 2024 documentary film about the Quebec town

== See also ==
- Château Malartic-Lagravière, a French winery
