= Joan Hart =

Joan Hart may refer to:

- Joan Hart (sprinter), New Zealand sprinter
- Joan Hart (actress), Canadian actress
- Joan Shakespeare, later Hart, sister of William Shakespeare

== See also ==
- Melissa Joan Hart, American actress
