= 33 Immortals =

- Developer: Thunder Lotus Games
- Publisher: Thunder Lotus Games
- Director: Stephan Logier
- Composer: Maxime Lacoste-Lebuis
- Platforms: Windows; Xbox Series X/S
- Release: March 18, 2025 (early access); June 10, 2026 (full release)
- Genres: Action, roguelike
- Mode: Multiplayer

33 Immortals is an action roguelike video game developed and published by Thunder Lotus Games. The game was released for Windows and Xbox Series X/S through early access on March 18, 2025, and was fully released on June 10, 2026.

== Gameplay ==
33 Immortals is an action video game played from a top-down perspective. In the game, the player assumes control of a damned soul who must fight through Hell, Purgatory and Heaven as they rebel against a cruel God who banishes them. The game supports 33-player cooperative multiplayer, and each gameplay session, which lasts around 25 minutes, is comparable to raid missions from massively multiplayer online games (MMO).

Players start each session in the "Dark Forest", a hub world in which players can select their character archetypes (melee, ranged, support, or tank) before venturing through the Eternal Gate into the battlefield. In the first zone, called Inferno, players are initially split into teams of six as they explore the map and completes Torture Chambers (described by the team as mini-dungeons). Once a chamber is completed, players will unlock Relics and trigger God's wrath, which causes the entire map to be engulfed in fire. The remaining surviving players are then split into three teams, with each team having one chance to complete "Ascension Battles", which unlock Legendary Relics that provide global bonuses to the entire team. The session will then culminate with a boss fight. Enemies placement, gameplay challenges and rewards in each session are randomly generated. The players are then returned to the Dark Forest in which they can change their loadout and interact with non-playable characters to unlock new weapons, relics and poetic perks, which typically provide stat advantages.

Players can freely customize their playable avatar with various cosmetic items. The game features 14 different weapons inspired by the seven deadly sins and the seven heavenly virtues, and players must collaborate with each other to unleash "co-op powers", which are powerful moves that can inflict a large amount of devastating damage to enemies. If a player is defeated, other players can revive them within a set period, though the game has a set difficulty, meaning that players are more likely to complete their objectives and defeat the bosses successfully if all of their teammates survive.

== Development ==
33 Immortals was developed by Thunder Lotus Games, the studio behind Spiritfarer. The setting of the game was inspired by The Divine Comedy, with Dante, Beatrice, Virgil, and Charon all appearing in the game as supporting characters, though their backgrounds were reworked to meet modern values. For instance, Beatrice was reimagined from a guide in Purgatory to the "leader of the rebellion", and Virgil becomes a female scholar who is interested in "science, moral values, and the use of weapons".

33 Immortals is Thunder Lotus' first online video game. To meet the challenges of developing an online game, the studio expanded into two parallel development team, and recruited personnel with prior experience working on a multiplayer project. While preparing extensively is essential for players to succeed in raid missions in other MMO games, 33 Immortals was described by the team as a "pick up and raid" experience, as the game streamlines the mission process and allows players to jump into action "as quick and seamless as possible". While the team initially experimented with having 100 players in a gameplay session, the maximum player count was reduced to 33. According to the team, 33 was chosen because each part of The Divine Comedy has 33 chapters.

Thunder Lotus announced 33 Immortals in June 2023 at the Xbox Games Showcase.

== Release ==
The game was released via early access on March 18, 2025 for Windows and Xbox Series X/S. As of June 2025, Thunder Lotus aimed to fully release the game in 2026, with Thunder Lotus announcing the game to release on June 10, 2026.
