= Buddha's Little Finger (film) =

- Directed by: Tony Pemberton
- Screenplay by: Tony Pemberton; William Jennings; Marina Shron; Saul Fussiner; Victor Pelevin; Stephen Cleary
- Based on: "Chapayev and Void" by Victor Pelevin
- Produced by: Karsten Stöter; Benny Drechsel; Martin Paul-Hus
- Starring: Toby Kebbell; André Hennicke; Karine Vanasse; Stipe Erceg; Christoph Bach
- Cinematography: Stéphanie Anne Weber Biron
- Music by: Delphine Measroch
- Release date: September 1, 2015
- Running time: 84 minutes
- Countries: Germany; Canada
- Language: English
- Budget: €2.2 million

Buddha's Little Finger is an English-language feature film directed by Tony Pemberton and starring Toby Kebbell. The screenplay is based on Victor Pelevin's 1996 novel Chapayev and Void, which is known in the US as Buddha's Little Finger and in the UK as Clay Machine Gun. The genre of the film has been called drama, psychological romance, arthouse, and thriller. It was released in Germany on September 1, 2015.

== Synopsis ==
Unemployed Russian poet Pyotr Voyd arrested by KGB during the 1991 Soviet August Coup, by tortures he loses consciousness and appears in 1919 post-revolutionary Russia, where he fights on the same side with the legendary Red cavalry commander Chapaev and his machine-gunner Anka. The strange memory lapses all the time throw him to the bandits' Moscow of nineties, then to the Russian Civil War back and forth, again and again.

== Cast ==
- Toby Kebbell as Pyotr Voyd
- André Hennicke as Chapaev
- Karine Vanasse as Anna
- Yuki Iwamoto as Mongolian
- Stipe Erceg as Volodin
- Ivan Shvedoff as Shurik
- Trystan Pütter as Kolyan
- David Scheller as Zherbunov
- Gerdy Zint as Barbolin
- Anne-Marie Cadieux as Timurovna
- Bernd Michael Lade as Major Smirnov
- Hildegard Schroedter as Mrs. Kuznets
- Christoph Bach as Vorblei
- Nick Dong-Sik as Kawabata
- Irshad Panjatan as Buddha
- Lilith Stangenberg as Blind Woman
- Marko Dyrlich as Lutze
- Vincent Redetzki as Young Man
- Mario Mentrup as Shabby Man
- Axel Sichrovsky as Furmanov
- Dennis Kamitz as Pilgrim
- Dominik Paul Weber as Kostrov
- Jerry Gerom as Russian student

== Production ==
=== Funding ===
In 2006 film was officially selected for the third Berlinale Co-Production Market. As Mikheil Kalatozishvili early produced the film notes in 2008—2009, the filming start is delayed because of financial difficulties on the side of Western partners. In 2012 Tony Pemberton tells, that when Kalatozishvili died they were to get a million dollars from the Russian film funds but finally he wouldn't get grants because he is not Russian.

=== Title ===
The translation of Pelevin's novel by Andrew Bromfield for UK has name "The Clay Machine Gun", and for US — "Budda's Little Finger". According to the translator Andreas Tretner he had invented the German name of the book — "Buddhas kleiner Finger"(in German), and as "The Clay Machine Gun" was less successful name, Americans had chosen their one. Pemberton's film has the same name.

=== Screenplay ===
External image
- Screenplay of "Buddha's Little Finger" at Karine Vanasse's Instagram

As reported in 2011 by "Правда.Ру" screenplay was replenished with dungeons of Lubyanka and cannons firing at White House, though earlier was "planned" style of "incredible cocaine trip" with the respect to the original text. According to the film producer Karsten Stöter scenario was seriously adapted and interprets text of the original novel quite freely.

Viktor Pelevin, according to the director, have read the script and responded positively, he said that he likes "115 pages out of 120, and with these 5 pages you have managed to almost destroy the whole story", so he wrote a number of his comments how to fix.

=== Shooting ===
External image
- Photos of Filming Location at Flickr

Filming had planned to produce in Leipzig and Berlin. According to the director, he had to reduce the number of filming to 30 days, although earlier there were planned a 40-days filming, finally, because of the budget deficit - 21.

In accordance to the data of "filmportal.de" shooting have been conducted August 28, 2012—September 25, 2012.

=== Cast ===
Western actors play the starring roles of the film, so as planned initially, the French actor Jean-Marc Barr should play the role of Volodin, British actor Rupert Friend will play the role of Pyotr Voyd, and Sophia Myles as Anna. According to Mikheil Kalatozishvili, to make the film truthful — the Russian actors must be at least in the crew of the film, and western stars is a kind of "duck call" for the public from overseas.

== Release ==
The dates of release and filming were repeatedly postponed, so according to the IMDb release was scheduled for 2009. In August 2012, one of the film producers, Martin Paul-Hus, pointed out that the film will be ready by September 2013, same time in December 2012 the director hoped to release film in the spring of 2013.

As tells film director Tony Pemberton, he spent 10 years to make this film.

=== Premiere ===
The premiere of "Buddha's Little Finger" took place on August 6, 2015 in Leipzig.

== See also ==
- Dreams (1993 film)
