= Far Beyond the Pasturelands =

- French: Au-delà des hautes vallées
- Directed by: Maude Plante-Husaruk; Maxime Lacoste-Lebuis
- Written by: Maude Plante-Husaruk
- Produced by: Clotilde Vatrinet
- Cinematography: Maude Plante-Husaruk
- Edited by: Maude Plante-Husaruk
- Music by: Maxime Lacoste-Lebuis
- Distributed by: Les Films du 3 Mars
- Release date: November 2021 (RIDM)
- Running time: 84 minutes
- Country: Canada
- Language: French

Far Beyond the Pasturelands (French: Au-delà des hautes vallées) is a Canadian documentary film, directed by Maude Plante-Husaruk and Maxime Lacoste-Lebuis and released in 2021. The film centres on a small rural village in Nepal, whose residents support themselves by foraging for yarsagumba, a rare but highly valuable fungus that grows out of the decomposing bodies of dead caterpillars in Nepal and Tibet.

The film highlights both the economic exploitation of the villagers, who are paid just a few dollars for their harvest even though the dealer can sell it for over $18,000 per kilogram at market, and the unsustainable overharvesting that threatens to destroy the entire supply chain.

The film premiered at the 2021 Montreal International Documentary Festival, before going into wider commercial release in 2022.

== Awards ==
Award	Date of ceremony	Category	Recipient(s)	Result	Ref.
Prix Iris	December 10, 2023	Best Cinematography in a Documentary	Maude Plante-Husaruk	Nominated	
Prix Iris	December 10, 2023	Best Original Music in a Documentary	Maxime Lacoste-Lebuis	Nominated	
Prix Iris	December 10, 2023	Best Sound in a Documentary	Maxime Lacoste-Lebuis, Eric Shaw, Jean Paul Vialard	Nominated	
