= Babysitter (2022 film) =

2022 film by Monia Chokri

- Canadian theatrical release poster
- Directed by: Monia Chokri
- Written by: Catherine Léger
- Based on: Baby-sitter by Catherine Léger
- Produced by: Martin Paul-Hus; Catherine Léger; Pierre-Marcel Blanchot; Fabrice Lambot
- Starring: Patrick Hivon; Monia Chokri; Nadia Tereszkiewicz; Steve Laplante
- Cinematography: Josée Deshaies
- Edited by: Pauline Gaillard
- Music by: Émile Sornin
- Production companies: Amérique Film; Phase 4 Productions
- Distributed by: Maison 4:3 (Canada); BAC Films (France)
- Release dates: 22 January 2022 (Sundance); 27 April 2022 (France); 3 June 2022 (Quebec)
- Running time: 87 minutes
- Countries: Canada; France
- Language: French
- Box office: $152,034

Babysitter is a 2022 dark comedy film directed by Monia Chokri. Adapted by Catherine Léger from her 2017 play Baby-sitter, the film stars Patrick Hivon as Cédric, a man who goes viral after a video surfaces of him drunkenly kissing a female reporter during a live broadcast. Meanwhile, his wife Nadine (Chokri) is struggling with post-partum depression following the birth of their child. Cédric hires a young babysitter (Nadia Tereszkiewicz) to take care of the baby, to the surprise of Nadine, with whom she eventually develops her own special relationship.

A co-production between Canada and France, the film was shot in Montreal, Quebec, from August to October 2020. It was submitted for consideration by the 2021 Cannes Film Festival, but was not selected. Babysitter premiered in the Midnight section of the Sundance Film Festival on 22 January 2022. The film was released theatrically in France on 27 April 2022 by BAC Films and in Quebec on 3 June 2022 by Maison 4:3.

== Plot ==
Cédric Roberge, a 42-year-old engineer, and his wife Nadine are a suburban couple who have just had their first child, a girl named Léa. While attending an MMA fight with his friends one night, Cédric drunkenly kisses a reporter, Chantal Tremblay, on the side of her head during a live television broadcast. After a video of the incident goes viral overnight, he is indefinitely suspended from his job. Nadine, who is struggling with post-partum depression, decides to end her maternity leave and return to work, leaving Cédric to take care of Léa. Instead, Nadine secretly checks into a local motel for some alone time.

Cédric's brother Jean-Michel, a journalist who wrote a scathing op-ed on the incident, confronts him about his misogynistic tendencies. Nadine suggests that Cédric write a letter of apology to Chantal. Meanwhile, Cédric hires a cheery and mysterious babysitter, 22-year-old Amy. Later that day, Nadine arrives home while Cédric is out and is surprised to meet Amy. That night, Cédric is aghast when Nadine admits that she has been pretending to go to work while hiding out in a motel. Assisted by Jean-Michel, Cédric seeks to redeem himself by writing Sexist Story, a book featuring 200 letters of apology to women everywhere, including Chantal as well as Beyoncé and Kim Kardashian.

One day, Cédric and Nadine are stunned when Amy arrives at their house in a sexy French maid uniform, claiming that wearing a uniform motivates her. While alone with Amy in her bedroom, Nadine begins to suffer a panic attack, and Amy calms her down. Later, Nadine wears a lavender cape that was gifted to her by Amy around the house, leaving Cédric and Jean-Michel puzzled. Amy, still dressed as a French maid, also gifts Nadine a servant bell and acts as her personal servant.

Cédric and Jean-Michel sign with a publishing executive who views Sexist Story as a potential bestseller. However, when Cédric's friend Tessier recognizes Amy from a LARP event they attended for a mutual friend's birthday where she was dressed as a "medieval hooker", Jean-Michel pushes Cédric out and resolves to write the book himself. After Jean-Michel's book launch, Cédric and Nadine go to the nearby woods to have sex, whereupon she attempts to peg him with a strap-on dildo (another gift from Amy), prompting Cédric to flee in horror.

Returning home that night, Nadine breaks down in tears and is consoled by Amy; it is implied that the two women have sex. Afterwards, when asked by Amy, Nadine informs her that she no longer needs her. As Cédric returns home the next morning, he sees Amy leaving the house and disappearing into the fog. Cédric then joins Nadine in bed, and they hold hands. Some time later, Jean-Michel appears on a talk show to promote Sexist Story and becomes emotional when reading an excerpt from the book dedicated to Amy. Nadine throws away Amy's gifts, but the strap-on dildo is thrown back at her as the garbage truck drives off.

== Cast ==
- Patrick Hivon as Cédric
- Monia Chokri as Nadine
- Nadia Tereszkiewicz as Amy
- Steve Laplante as Jean-Michel
- Hubert Proulx as Tessier
- Stéphane Moukarzel as Carlos
- Nathalie Breuer as Brigitte
- Patrice Dubois as Christian
- Ève Duranceau as Chantal Tremblay

== Reception ==
=== Critical response ===
On the review aggregator website Rotten Tomatoes, 43% of 21 critics' reviews are positive. Metacritic, which uses a weighted average, assigned the film a score of 64 out of 100, based on five critics, indicating "generally favorable" reviews.

=== Accolades ===
Award	Date of ceremony	Category	Recipient(s)	Result	Ref.
Canadian Screen Awards	16 April 2023	Best Motion Picture	Martin Paul-Hus, Fabrice Lambot, Catherine Léger, Pierre-Marcel Blanchot	Nominated	
Canadian Screen Awards	16 April 2023	Best Lead Performance in a Film	Monia Chokri	Nominated	
Canadian Screen Awards	16 April 2023	Best Supporting Performance in a Film	Nadia Tereszkiewicz	Nominated	
Canadian Screen Awards	16 April 2023	Best Adapted Screenplay	Catherine Léger	Nominated	
Canadian Screen Awards	16 April 2023	Best Visual Effects	Marc Hall	Nominated	
Prix collégial du cinéma québécois	2023	Best Film	Babysitter	Nominated	
Prix Iris	10 December 2023	Best Film	Martin Paul-Hus, Catherine Léger, Pierre-Marcel Blanchot, Fabrice Lambot	Nominated	
Prix Iris	10 December 2023	Best Director	Monia Chokri	Nominated	
Prix Iris	10 December 2023	Best Actor	Patrick Hivon	Nominated	
Prix Iris	10 December 2023	Best Supporting Actor	Steve Laplante	Nominated	
Prix Iris	10 December 2023	Best Supporting Actress	Nadia Tereszkiewicz	Nominated	
Prix Iris	10 December 2023	Best Screenplay	Catherine Léger	Nominated	
Prix Iris	10 December 2023	Best Art Direction	Colombe Raby	Nominated	
Prix Iris	10 December 2023	Best Costume Design	Guillaume Laflamme	Nominated	
Prix Iris	10 December 2023	Best Cinematography	Josée Deshaies	Nominated	
Prix Iris	10 December 2023	Best Editing	Pauline Gaillard	Nominated	
Prix Iris	10 December 2023	Best Hairstyling	Ann-Louise Landry	Nominated	
Prix Iris	10 December 2023	Best Makeup	Adriana Verbert	Nominated	
Prix Iris	10 December 2023	Best Visual Effects	Marc Hall	Nominated	
Prix Iris	10 December 2023	Best Casting	Annie St-Pierre, Antoinette Boulat	Nominated	
