= Charles-Aubey Houde =

Canadian actor

Charles-Aubey Houde is a Canadian film and television actor from Quebec. He is most noted for his performance as Bébert in the film The Dishwasher (Le Plongeur), for which he won the Prix Iris for Best Supporting Actor at the 25th Quebec Cinema Awards in 2023, and was a Canadian Screen Award nominee for Best Supporting Performance in a Drama Film at the 12th Canadian Screen Awards in 2024.

He has also appeared in the films Sisters and Neighbors! (Nos belles-sœurs) and Redemptions (Rédemptions), and the television series Aller Simple and Bon Cop, Bad Cop.
