= Evil Words =

2003 Canadian thriller film

- French: Sur le seuil
- Directed by: Éric Tessier
- Written by: Éric Tessier; Patrick Senécal
- Based on: Sur le seuil by Patrick Senécal
- Produced by: Nicole Robert
- Starring: Michel Côté; Patrick Huard
- Cinematography: Denis-Noël Mostert
- Edited by: Alain Baril
- Music by: Ned Bouhalassa
- Production company: GO Films
- Distributed by: Alliance Atlantis
- Release date: October 3, 2003
- Running time: 100 minutes
- Country: Canada
- Language: French

Evil Words (French: Sur le seuil, lit. "On the Threshold") is a Canadian thriller film, directed by Éric Tessier and released in 2003. Adapted from the novel Sur le seuil by Patrick Senécal, the film stars Michel Côté as Paul Lacasse, a doctor who is treating famous horror novelist Thomas Roy (Patrick Huard) following a suicide attempt, and begins to find evidence that Roy was in close proximity to every one of the last several dozen tragedies to occur anywhere in Canada.

The cast also includes Catherine Florent, Albert Millaire, Jean L'Italien, Jacques Lavallée, Jean-Pierre Bergeron, Normand D'Amour, Nicolas Canuel, Frédérique Collin, Annette Garant, Christine Foley, Alexis Belec, Paul Doucet, Guy Boutet, Anne-Marie Labelle, Frédéric Gilles, Richard Fréchette, Martin Dubreuil, Geneviève Laroche, Patrick Senécal, Lise Roy, Patrice Bélanger, Stéphane Blanchette and Éric Cabana in supporting roles.

The film opened in theatres on October 3, 2003.

== Attempted remakes ==
Within a couple of weeks of the film's release, Miramax acquired rights to produce an American remake, but this never materialized.

In 2015, GO Films, the original film's studio, announced plans to produce its own English-language remake of the film, to be titled Threshold and directed by Érik Canuel with the setting transferred to Boston, but this project was also never completed.

== Awards ==
Louis Hone received a Jutra Award nomination for Best Sound at the 6th Jutra Awards in 2004.
