= Maude Plante-Husaruk =

Canadian photographer and filmmaker

Maude Plante-Husaruk is a Canadian photographer and filmmaker, who works principally in collaboration with her husband Maxime Lacoste-Lebuis.

They are most noted for the 2016 short film The Botanist, which was named to the Toronto International Film Festival's annual year-end Canada's Top Ten list for 2017, and the 2021 feature documentary film Far Beyond the Pasturelands (Au-delà des hautes vallées), for which Plante-Husaruk received a Prix Iris nomination for Best Cinematography in a Documentary at the 25th Quebec Cinema Awards in 2023.
