= Farador =

- Directed by: Édouard Albernhe Tremblay
- Written by: Édouard Albernhe Tremblay; Eric K. Boulianne; Daniel Boulanger; Marc-Antoine Rioux
- Produced by: Marc Biron; Sonia Despars
- Starring: Eric K. Boulianne; Catherine Brunet; Benoit Drouin-Germain; Lucien Ratio; Marc-Antoine Marceau
- Cinematography: François Gamache
- Edited by: Guillaume Choquette
- Music by: Uberko
- Production companies: Parallaxes; Octopods; FoxP2
- Distributed by: TVA Films
- Release date: March 4, 2023 (RVQC)
- Running time: 104 minutes
- Country: Canada
- Language: French

Farador is a Canadian fantasy comedy film, directed by Édouard Albernhe Tremblay and released in 2023. Expanded from his 2011 short film La Bataille de Farador, the film centres on a group of underachieving geeks who have never grown out of their teenage obsession with Farador, a role-playing game which is essentially a fictionalized version of Dungeons & Dragons.

== Plot ==
Charles (Eric K. Boulianne), Louis (Benoit Drouin-Germain) and Guillaume (Lucien Ratio) are three friends who live together as roommates in the same house, where they spend all of their free time still playing the same Farador campaign they began as teenagers; their other friend Paul (Marc-Antoine Marceau) has recently moved out of the house and abandoned the game to live with his girlfriend.

When Charles's sister Kim (Catherine Brunet), who has recently broken up with her longtime Belgian boyfriend Tom (Florent Losson) after realizing that she might be a lesbian, moves into Paul's vacated room, her presence, and her determination to push her brother to finally take the plunge on his unrealized ambition to write and publish an erotic fantasy novel, upset the group dynamics and force them to make one last push to finally reach the Castle of Farador and end the game.

== Production and distribution ==
The film was shot in late 2021 and early 2022, principally in Quebec with a small amount of location shooting in France for the castle scenes. In May 2022, filming took place at the Château de Lassay in Lassay-les-Châteaux (Mayenne). It blends both realistic scenes set in the home, and fantasy scenes set in the game's internal reality.

The film's first preview trailer was released in September 2022.

It premiered at the 2023 Rendez-vous Québec Cinéma, before going into commercial release in April. Tremblay and the film's main cast members were guests at the 2022 Montreal Comiccon, and the 2023 Quebec City Comicon.

== Critical response ==
Geneviève Bouchard of Le Soleil rated the film seven out of ten, writing that it skillfully blended its realistic and fantasy elements, and singling Lucien Ratio's performance as Guillaume out as one of the highlights.

Maxime Demers of Le Journal de Montréal rated the film 3.5 out of five, calling it a funny and sensitive portrait of a group of young adults reluctant to grow up.

== Awards ==
Award	Date of ceremony	Category	Recipient(s)	Result	Ref(s)
Prix Iris	December 10, 2023	Best Costume Design	Annabelle Roy, Delphine Gagné	Nominated	
Prix Iris	December 10, 2023	Best Makeup	Lyne Tremblay, Faustina De Sousa, François Gauthier, Michael Loncin	Won	
Prix Iris	December 10, 2023	Best Visual Effects	Marc Hall	Nominated	
Prix Iris	December 10, 2023	Best First Film	Édouard Albernhe Tremblay	Nominated	
