= Patrick Senécal =

French-Canadian writer and scenarist (born 1967)

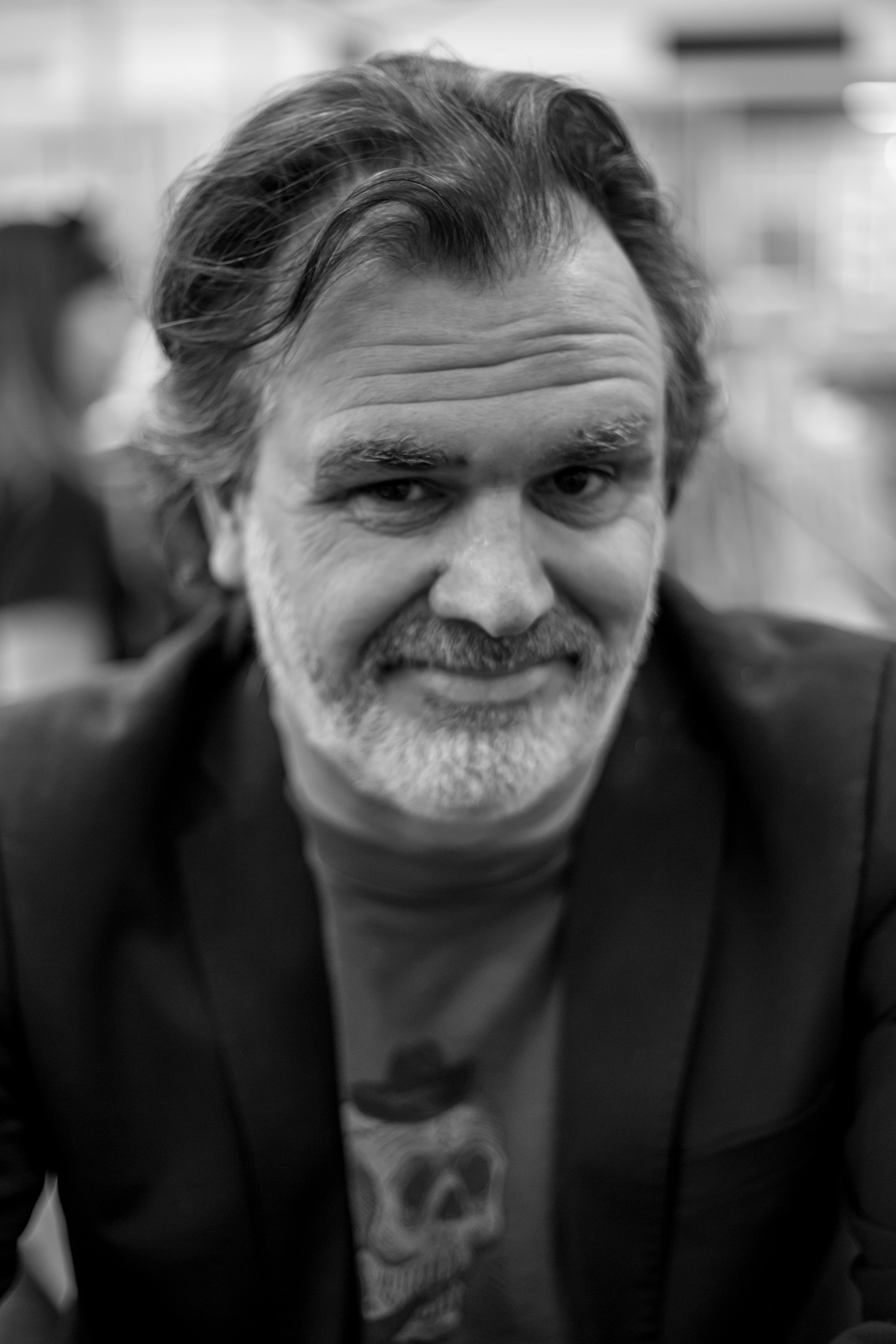
- Patrick Senécal in 2018
- Born: October 20, 1967 (age 59); Drummondville, Quebec, Canada
- Occupations: Novelist, scenarist
- Writing career
- Period: 1994–present
- Genres: drama, Horror, crime fiction
- Website: www.patricksenecal.net

Patrick Senécal is a French-Canadian writer and scenarist known for his horror oriented drama novels. Senécal is well known in Québec, Canada, for his unique dark genre; his work has often been compared to that of Stephen King. Three of his novels were adapted into films in his native Québec.

== Personal life ==
Senécal holds a bachelor's degree in French studies from the Université de Montréal. He was also a teacher for ten years at the Cégep de Drummondville.

== Books ==
=== Novels ===
- 1994: 5150 rue des Ormes
- 1995: Le Passager
- 1998: Sur le Seuil
- 2000: Aliss (a retelling of Alice in Wonderland)
- 2002: Les Sept Jours du Talion (translated as Seven Days in 2019)
- 2004: Oniria
- 2007: Le Vide
- 2009: Hell.com
- 2010: Against God (Contre Dieu)
- 2011: Malphas 1. Le Cas des casiers carnassiers
- 2012: Malphas 2. Torture, luxure et lecture
- 2013: Malphas 3. Ce qui se passe dans la cave reste dans la cave
- 2014: Malphas 4. Grande Liquidation
- 2015: Faims
- 2016: L'Autre Reflet
- 2017: Il Y Aura Des Morts
- 2019: Ceux de là-bas
- 2021: Flots
- 2022: Résonances
- 2024: Civilisés
- 2025: Le M Club

=== Youth novels ===
- 2007: Sept comme Setteur
- 2010: Madame Wenham.

=== Collaborative work ===
- 2013: Quinze minutes (L’Orphéon)

=== Short stories ===
- 1998: "Ressac"
- 1999: "La Source"
- 1999: "Eaux troubles

=== Graphic novels ===
- 2014: Sale Canal (With Tristan Demers)
- 2020: Aliss (with Jeik Dion)

== Filmography ==
Year	Title	Credit	Director	Novel adaptation	Notes
2003	Evil Words (Sur le seuil)	Co-scenarist	Éric Tessier	Yes	
2006	Chambre no.13	Scenarist (1 episode)		No	TV series
2009	5150 Elm's Way	Scenarist	Éric Tessier	Yes	
2010	7 Days	Scenarist	Podz	Yes	
2011	La Reine Rouge	Scenarist, Director	Patrick Senécal, Podz & Olivier Sabino	No	Web series about the events in between his books "5150 Elm's Way" and "Aliss".
2012	Sur les traces de la Fusion	Director (2 episodes)	TVA	No	Web series.
TBA	Sept comme setteur	TBA	TBA	Yes	

== Awards ==
Year	Nominee / work	Award	Result
2001	Aliss	Prix Boréal : Best novel	Won
2006	Sur le Seuil	Prix Masterton : Francophone novel	Won
2006	Chambre no 13	Gémeaux : Scenario	Nominated
2007	Le Vide	Prix Saint-Pacôme : Best Quebeker crime fiction	Won
2007	Le Vide	La Presse du Salon du livre de Montréal : Public's Choice	Nominated
2008	Le Vide	Grand Prix des auteurs de la Montérégie : Jury's Price	Won
2009	Hell.com	Prix du public du Salon du livre de la Côte-Nord	Won
2012	Malphas 2. Torture, luxure et lecture	La Presse du Salon du livre de Montréal : Public's Choice	Nominated
