= Two Women (2025 film) =

2025 film by Chloé Robichaud

- French-language theatrical release poster
- French: Deux femmes en or
- Directed by: Chloé Robichaud
- Screenplay by: Catherine Léger
- Based on: Two Women in Gold; 1970 film by Claude Fournier; Marie-José Raymond
- Produced by: Catherine Léger; Martin Paul-Hus
- Starring: Karine Gonthier-Hyndman; Laurence Leboeuf; Mani Soleymanlou
- Cinematography: Sara Mishara
- Edited by: Matthieu Bouchard
- Music by: Philippe Brault
- Production company: Amérique Film
- Distributed by: Maison 4:3
- Release date: January 25, 2025 (Sundance)
- Running time: 100 minutes
- Country: Canada
- Language: French

Two Women (French: Deux femmes en or) is a Canadian sex comedy film, directed by Chloé Robichaud and released in 2025. A modernized remake of Claude Fournier's influential 1970 comedy film Two Women in Gold, the film stars Karine Gonthier-Hyndman and Laurence Leboeuf as Florence and Violette, two unfulfilled suburban mothers who begin to reevaluate their life priorities after Florence engages in an extramarital affair.

== Plot ==
Violette and Florence live in adjacent apartments, both with a child and in sexless relationships. Violette, whose husband Benoit is cheating on her with Eli under the pretense of business trips, spends all day breastfeeding and looking after her daughter while hearing the sound of a crow cawing. She asks Florence about the noise, eventually asking if the sound is Florence having sex and engaging in exhibitionism. Florence denies it, but it gives her the idea to stop taking antidepressants and start being more adventurous, including sleeping with a handyman and unintentionally cutting her wrist at a bar. She tells Violette that monogamy is an invention intended to benefit men, and Violette decides to stop breastfeeding and follow Florence's example.

The two women engage in sex with tradesmen and a female window cleaner. Florence's partner David, who becomes aware of her infidelity, passively accepts things and starts taking her antidepressants unprescribed to justify his own lack of libido. Benoit remains unaware of Violette's actions and parts of her history while continuing his own affair, but is unsatisfied with how Eli feels about him. While at a hockey game with Benoit and Eli, David kisses Eli and then collapses due to mixing alcohol and his medication. Benoit and Violette both learn that the other has been unfaithful, and Florence learns about David and Eli. Benoit and Violette resolve to rekindle their marriage, while Florence and David separate.

== Cast ==
- Karine Gonthier-Hyndman as Florence
- Laurence Leboeuf as Violette
- Mani Soleymanlou as David
- Félix Moati as Benoit
- Sophie Nélisse as Jessica
- Juliette Gariépy as Eli
- Isabelle Brouillette as Pénélope
- Jean-Sébastien Girard as Sébastien
- Patrick Abellard as William

== Production ==
The screenplay was written by Catherine Léger, based on her own 2023 theatrical update of Fournier's original film. It was shot in spring 2024 in Montreal, Quebec.

== Distribution ==
The film premiered at the 2025 Sundance Film Festival, where it won the World Cinema Dramatic Special Jury Award, with commercial release slated for May 31.

== Reception ==
On the review aggregator website Rotten Tomatoes, 76% of 41 critics' reviews are positive. The website's consensus reads: "Two Women is a playful, sexy, and energetic comedy that balances raucous humor with earnest explorations of infidelity, motherhood, and the complexities of desire." On Metacritic, the film has a weighted average score of 61 out of 100 based on 13 critics, which the site labels as "generally favorable" reviews.

== Awards ==
Award	Date of ceremony	Category	Recipient(s)	Result	Ref(s)
Directors Guild of Canada	2025	Best Direction in a Feature Film	Chloé Robichaud	Nominated	
Quebec Cinema Awards	2025	Best Film	Martin Paul-Hus, Catherine Léger	Nominated	
Quebec Cinema Awards	2025	Best Director	Chloé Robichaud	Nominated	
Quebec Cinema Awards	2025	Best Actress	Karine Gonthier-Hyndman	Won	
Quebec Cinema Awards	2025	Best Actress	Laurence Leboeuf	Nominated	
Quebec Cinema Awards	2025	Best Supporting Actress	Juliette Gariépy	Nominated	
Quebec Cinema Awards	2025	Best Screenplay	Catherine Léger	Nominated	
Quebec Cinema Awards	2025	Best Art Direction	Louisa Schabas	Nominated	
Quebec Cinema Awards	2025	Best Costume Design	Patricia McNeil	Nominated	
Quebec Cinema Awards	2025	Best Cinematography	Sara Mishara	Nominated	
Quebec Cinema Awards	2025	Best Editing	Matthieu Bouchard, Chloé Robichaud	Nominated	
Quebec Cinema Awards	2025	Best Original Music	Philippe Brault	Nominated	
Quebec Cinema Awards	2025	Best Sound	Sylvain Brassard, Stephen De Oliveira, Luc Boudrias	Nominated	
Quebec Cinema Awards	2025	Best Hairstyling	Vincent Dufault	Nominated	
Quebec Cinema Awards	2025	Best Makeup	Djina Caron	Nominated	
Quebec Cinema Awards	2025	Best Casting	Karel Quinn	Nominated	
Canadian Screen Awards	2026	Best Lead Performance in a Comedy Film	Karine Gonthier-Hyndman	Nominated	
Canadian Screen Awards	2026	Best Lead Performance in a Comedy Film	Laurence Leboeuf	Nominated	
Canadian Screen Awards	2026	Best Supporting Performance in a Comedy Film	Juliette Gariépy	Nominated	
Canadian Screen Awards	2026	Best Adapted Screenplay	Catherine Léger	Nominated	
Canadian Screen Awards	2026	Best Editing	Matthieu Bouchard, Chloé Robichaud	Nominated	
