= Les Salopes, or the Naturally Wanton Pleasure of Skin =

- Film poster
- Les salopes ou le sucre naturel de la peau
- Directed by: Renée Beaulieu
- Written by: Renée Beaulieu
- Produced by: Renée Beaulieu
- Starring: Brigitte Poupart; Pierre-Yves Cardinal; Vincent Leclerc; Louise Portal
- Cinematography: Philippe St-Gelais
- Edited by: Renée Beaulieu; Martin Bourgault
- Music by: David Thomas
- Production company: Productions du moment
- Distributed by: Filmoption
- Release date: 7 September 2018 (TIFF)
- Country: Canada
- Language: French

Les Salopes, or the Naturally Wanton Pleasure of Skin (French: Les salopes ou le sucre naturel de la peau) is a Canadian drama film, directed by Renée Beaulieu and released in 2018. The film stars Brigitte Poupart as Marie-Claire, a dermatologist studying the role of skin in sexuality.

The cast also includes Pierre-Yves Cardinal, Vincent Leclerc, Louise Portal, Charlotte Aubin, Paul Ahmarani, Normand D'Amour, Romane Denis and Pierre Kwenders.

The film premiered at the 2018 Toronto International Film Festival.
