= Jotun (video game) =

2015 video game

Jøtun
- Developer: Thunder Lotus Games
- Publisher: Thunder Lotus Games
- Composer: Maxime Lacoste-Lebuis
- Engine: Unity
- Platforms: Windows, OS X, Linux, PlayStation 4, Wii U, Xbox One, Nintendo Switch, Stadia
- Release: Windows, OS X, Linux; September 29, 2015; Wii U; September 8, 2016; PlayStation 4, Xbox One; September 9, 2016; Nintendo Switch; April 27, 2018; Stadia; May 26, 2020
- Genres: Action-adventure, puzzle, exploration
- Mode: Single-player

Jøtun is a 2015 action-adventure video game developed by Thunder Lotus Games. It was released for Windows, OS X, and Linux on September 29, 2015. The Wii U version was released on September 8, 2016, while the PlayStation 4 and Xbox One versions were released on September 9, 2016. The Nintendo Switch version was released on April 27, 2018. The Stadia version was released on May 26, 2020.

== Gameplay ==
Jøtun uses a hand drawn, frame-by-frame art style. Aside from the boss battles, the game revolves around exploration and puzzle solving, with a few enemies to fight. Exploration typically involves exploring various stages, with some giants to fight and various puzzles to solve. Puzzles often employ using axe swings to interact with objects (i.e. trees, boulders, and vines) and some other types of puzzles. In each stage, there is a Rune, an object the player must reach to continue the story, and a God Shrine, at which Thora can unlock and upgrade God Powers. There are also secret locations containing Ithunn's Apples, which give a permanent buff to Thora's health. Combat in the game is relatively rudimentary, with the main actions being an axe swing, axe chop, and dodge. The axe swing is the game's heavy attack: it takes a long time to perform, but does more damage than the axe chop. The axe chop is a light attack, which can be performed in a 2-hit combo, or a 3-hit combo and does small amounts of damage. Finally, the dodge is a roll, which the players can use to avoid attacks and (after the 2-hit combo) can dodge and swing for a third strike. Players can also use one of the God Powers: Frigg's Healing, Freya's Speed, Thor's Hammer, Odin's Spear, Loki's Decoy, or Heimdall's Shield. God Powers initially start off with two charges, but only a few can be upgraded to three, but all may be replenished at Mimir's Wells.

The hub of the game is known as Ginnungagap (the Void), from which players can access five areas. Each area consists of two stages, with the exception of Jera (which only has one stage). Once Thora collects the rune of both stages, she can advance to the boss fight, where she fights one of the five giants. After defeating the boss of the area, Thora will give some information about her life before her death.

== Plot ==
Jøtun's story follows Thora, a recently deceased Viking woman. Having suffered an inglorious death, she arrives at Ginnungagap and is commanded by Odin to travel across the realms and defeat several Jötunn, giant elementals of nature, power and chaos. This will allow her to impress the gods and enter Valhalla. After defeating the plant giant Jera, the warrior giant Fé, the ice giant Isa, the lightning giant Hagalaz and the fire giant Kaunan, she fights against Odin himself. After proving herself, she is ascended to Valhalla.

== Development ==
The game was announced by Canadian studio Thunder Lotus Games at PAX 2015, accompanied by screenshots and a gameplay video. The game was released in September 2015 on PC, and was released later on consoles. The game had a successful crowdfunding campaign which raised over $64,000 from 2,299 backers on Kickstarter. Additional funding came from the Canadian Media Fund and the Montreal Inc Foundation.

== Release ==
In October 2016, Thunder Lotus Games joined forces with the subscription box company, IndieBox, to create a physical release of Jøtun. This limited, individually-numbered collector's edition included a digital rights management-free game disc, original soundtrack, instruction manual, Steam key, and several custom-designed collectibles.

== Reception ==
Reception

Aggregate score
| Aggregator | Score |
|---|---|
| Metacritic | PC: 79/100; WIIU: 79/100; PS4: 72/100; XONE: 73/100; NS: 74/100 |

Review scores
| Publication | Score |
|---|---|
| Destructoid | PC: 9/10 |
| GameRevolution | PC: 4.5/5; PS4: 3.5/5 |
| GameSpot | PC: 8/10; XONE: 8/10; PS4: 8/10 |
| IGN | PC: 8/10 |
| Nintendo Life | WIIU: 9/10 |
| Nintendo World Report | WIIU: 8.5/10 |

Jøtun has a score of 79/100 on Metacritic. Game Revolution awarded the game 4.5 out of 5, saying "All told, Jotun is a wonderful experience with just a few sour notes." IGN awarded it a score of 8.0 out of 10, saying "Jotun is a wondrous trek through Norse mythology and the imposing giant bosses that inhabit its rich, beautiful world." GameSpot awarded it a score of 8.0 out of 10, saying "I want to hear Thora tell her tale again. Any good bedtime story that makes you want to hear it again right after it's over is one for the ages."
