= The Dishwasher (film) =

2023 Canadian drama film

- French: Le Plongeur
- Directed by: Francis Leclerc
- Written by: Francis Leclerc; Eric K. Boulianne
- Based on: Le Plongeur by Stéphane Larue
- Produced by: Marie-Claude Poulin
- Starring: Henri Richer-Picard; Charles-Aubey Houde
- Cinematography: Steve Asselin
- Edited by: Isabelle Malenfant
- Production company: Sphere Media
- Distributed by: Immina Films
- Release date: February 22, 2023 (RVQC)
- Running time: 127 minutes
- Country: Canada
- Language: French

The Dishwasher (French: Le Plongeur) is a Canadian drama film, directed by Francis Leclerc and released in 2023. An adaptation of the semi-autobiographical novel by Stéphane Larue, the film stars Henri Richer-Picard as Stéphane, who takes a menial job as a dishwasher in a restaurant after being left in deep debt by a gambling addiction.

The film's cast also includes Charles-Aubey Houde, Joan Hart, Maxime de Cotret, Fayolle Jean Jr., Robin L'Houmeau, Marie-Ève Beauregard, Zachary Évrard, Gabrielle Côté, Jade Charbonneau, Guillaume Laurin, Anthony Therrien, Julien Leclerc, Stéphan Allard, Justin Leyrolles-Bouchard, Luka Limoges, Emmanuel Schwartz and Eric K. Boulianne.

It features a soundtrack of classic rock and heavy metal songs alongside pop and electronic songs contemporary to the film's early-2000s setting, including material by Iron Maiden, Anonymus, Rancid, Neil Young, Anthrax, Stefie Shock, Groovy Aardvark, Radiohead, Ben Harper, Dumas, Leftfield, Sugar Ray, Godspeed You! Black Emperor, Metallica and Jean Leloup.

The film premiered on February 22, 2023, at the Rendez-vous Québec Cinéma, before opening commercially on February 24.

== Awards ==
Award	Date of ceremony	Category	Recipient(s)	Result	Ref(s)
Prix Iris	December 10, 2023	Best Film	Marie-Claude Poulin	Nominated	
Prix Iris	December 10, 2023	Best Director	Francis Leclerc	Nominated	
Prix Iris	December 10, 2023	Best Actor	Henri Picard	Nominated	
Prix Iris	December 10, 2023	Best Supporting Actor	Maxime de Cotret	Nominated	
Prix Iris	December 10, 2023	Best Supporting Actor	Charles-Aubey Houde	Won	
Prix Iris	December 10, 2023	Revelation of the Year	Joan Hart	Nominated	
Prix Iris	December 10, 2023	Best Screenplay	Eric K. Boulianne, Francis Leclerc	Nominated	
Prix Iris	December 10, 2023	Best Art Direction	Mathieu Lemay	Nominated	
Prix Iris	December 10, 2023	Best Cinematography	Steve Asselin	Nominated	
Prix Iris	December 10, 2023	Best Editing	Isabelle Malenfant	Nominated	
Prix Iris	December 10, 2023	Best Sound	Olivier Calvert, Luc Boudrias, Yann Cleary	Nominated	
Prix Iris	December 10, 2023	Best Casting	Brigitte Viau	Nominated	
Canadian Screen Awards	2024	Best Supporting Performance in a Drama Film	Charles-Aubey Houde	Nominated	
Canadian Screen Awards	2024	Best Adapted Screenplay	Eric K. Boulianne, Francis Leclerc	Nominated	
Canadian Screen Awards	2024	Best Editing	Isabelle Malenfant	Nominated	
