= René-Daniel Dubois =

Canadian playwright and actor

René-Daniel Dubois, OC (born July 20, 1955, in Montreal) is a Québécois playwright and actor.

== Biography ==
=== Movie career ===
He is best known for his 1985 play Being at Home with Claude, which was adapted into an award-winning film in 1992 and the 2009 thriller drama 5150 Elm's Way. He was also a winner of the Governor General's Award for French language drama in 1984 for Ne blâmez jamais les Bédouins.

=== Theatrical career ===
Dubois' other plays have included Panique à Longueuil, 2 contes parmi tant d'autres pour une tribu perdue, 26 bis, impasse du colonel Foisy, Le printemps, monsieur Deslauriers and Le Troisième fils du professeur Yourolov, as well as the French translation of Timothy Findley's Elizabeth Rex (Elizabeth, roi d'Angleterre) and the French-Canadian adaptation of Mary Jones's Stones in His Pockets (Des roches dans ses poches).

== Personal life ==
He is openly gay.
