= Redemptions (film) =

- French: Rédemptions
- Directed by: Luc Picard
- Written by: Luc Picard
- Produced by: Christian Larouche
- Starring: Luc Picard; Kelly Depeault; Sophie Desmarais; Maxim Gaudette
- Cinematography: François Dutil
- Edited by: Jean-François Bergeron
- Music by: Alex Nevsky
- Production companies: Christal Films; Rumble Fish Productions
- Distributed by: Les Films Opale
- Release date: July 29, 2026
- Running time: 114 minutes
- Country: Canada
- Language: French

Redemptions (French: Rédemptions) is a Canadian crime drama film, directed by Luc Picard and released in 2026. The film stars Picard as Marcel, a former hitman who is forced out of retirement to commit two new murders for his bosses, unwittingly setting off a chain of events that ultimately endangers the life of his own daughter (Kelly Depeault).

The cast also includes Sophie Desmarais, Jean-Simon Leduc, Maxim Gaudette, Charles-Aubey Houde, Gérard Lanvin, Henri Picard, Louise Coldefy, Damien Bonnard, Léopold Lafontaine, Louise Proulx, Etienne Lou, Tony Calabretta, Yoann Blanc and Florence Mais in supporting roles.

The film is slated to open commercially on July 29, 2026. It is also slated to screen in competition at the 2026 Angoulême Francophone Film Festival.
