= Adrien (2015 film) =

- French: Le Garagiste
- Directed by: Renée Beaulieu
- Written by: Renée Beaulieu
- Produced by: Ian Quenneville; Ian Oliveri; Renée Beaulieu
- Starring: Normand D'Amour; Pierre-Yves Cardinal; Louise Portal
- Cinematography: Philippe Saint-Gelais
- Edited by: Renée Beaulieu
- Music by: Erik West-Millette
- Production company: Productions du Moment
- Distributed by: TVA Films
- Release date: August 29, 2015
- Running time: 88 minutes
- Country: Canada
- Language: French

Adrien (French: Le Garagiste) is a 2015 Canadian drama film, written and directed by Renée Beaulieu. The film stars Normand D'Amour as Adrien, a small-town automobile repair shop owner who is confronting his mortality as he awaits a kidney transplant.

The film was shot in Trois-Pistoles, Quebec.

The film garnered three Canadian Screen Award nominations at the 4th Canadian Screen Awards in 2016, in the categories of Best Overall Sound (Sylvain Brassard, Arnaud Têtu, Pascal Van Strydonck and Olivier Léger), Best Editing (Renée Beaulieu) and Best Sound Editing (Benoît Dame).
