= Émi Chicoine =

Canadian actress

Émi Chicoine is a Canadian actress from Quebec. She is most noted for her performance in the film Noemie Says Yes (Noémit dit oui), for which she received a Prix Iris nomination for Revelation of the Year at the 25th Quebec Cinema Awards in 2023.

The daughter of television director Alain Chicoine, she had her first acting role in the 2016 film Kiss Me Like a Lover (Embrasse-moi comme tu m'aimes). She has since appeared in the films Niagara and A Christmas Storm (Le Cyclone de Noël), and the television series Cheval Serpent, La panne, Bye Bye, District 31 and Indéfendable.
