= The Sower (2013 film) =

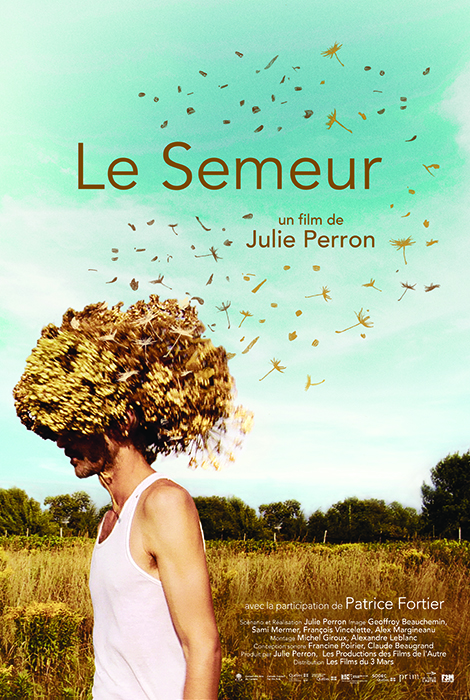
- Film poster
- French: Le semeur
- Directed by: Julie Perron
- Written by: Julie Perron
- Produced by: Julie Perron
- Starring: Patrice Fortier
- Cinematography: Geoffroy Beauchemin; Alex Margineanu; Sami Mermer; Francois Vincelette
- Edited by: Michel Giroux; Alexandre Leblanc
- Music by: Patrice Fortier; Olivier Légaré
- Production company: Les Films du 3 mars
- Release date: November 17, 2013 (RIDM)
- Running time: 80 minutes
- Country: Canada
- Language: French

The Sower (French: Le semeur) is a Canadian documentary film, directed by Julie Perron and released in 2013. The film centres on Patrice Fortier, an artist and seed technician who tries to preserve biodiversity by planting and maintaining rare plant cultivars.

Geoffroy Beauchemin, Alex Margineanu, Sami Mermer and Francois Vincelette received a Canadian Screen Award nomination for Best Cinematography in a Documentary at the 3rd Canadian Screen Awards in 2015.
