= Beyond Paper =

- French: Au-delà du papier
- Directed by: Oana Suteu Khintirian
- Written by: Oana Suteu Khintirian
- Produced by: Nathalie Cloutier
- Cinematography: Étienne Roussy
- Edited by: Oana Suteu Khintirian
- Music by: Peter Scherer
- Production company: National Film Board of Canada
- Release date: November 20, 2023 (RIDM)
- Running time: 131 minutes
- Country: Canada
- Language: French

Beyond Paper (French: Au-delà du papier) is a Canadian documentary film, directed by Oana Suteu Khintirian and released in 2021. The film is about the contemporary transition from paper to digital record-keeping, centring in particular on the impact of that shift on the process of preserving cultural heritage.

The film premiered in March 2023 at the Montreal International Festival of Films on Art, before going into wider commercial release in April.

== Critical response ==
Marc Glassman of Point of View praised the film in particular for finding human emotional angles to her story, writing that "Oana Suteu Khintirian hasn’t just made a film, which ultimately endorses paper and book and libraries. She’s made it about family: a cousin and spiritual sister, who publishes books in Bucharest features prominently as do others who are deeply moved by the historic romantic letters and a scholarly tradition that goes back for generations."

== Awards ==
Award	Date of ceremony	Category	Recipient(s)	Result	Ref.
Prix Iris	December 10, 2023	Best Editing in a Documentary	Oana Suteu Khintirian	Nominated	
Prix Iris	December 10, 2023	Best Sound in a Documentary	Catherine Van Der Donckt, Jean Paul Vialard	Nominated	
Canadian Screen Awards	May 2024	Best Feature Length Documentary	Oana Suteu Khintirian, Nathalie Cloutier	Nominated	
Canadian Screen Awards	May 2024	Best Cinematography in a Documentary	Étienne Roussy	Nominated	
Canadian Screen Awards	May 2024	Best Sound Design in a Documentary	Catherine Van Der Donckt, Stéphane Cadotte, Jean Paul Vialard, Geoffrey Mitchell	Nominated	
