= Renée Beaulieu =

Canadian film director and screenwriter

- Born: Trois-Pistoles, Quebec, Canada
- Occupations: Film director, screenwriter, professor
- Employer: Université de Montréal

Renée Beaulieu is a Canadian film director and screenwriter from Quebec.

Renée Beaulieu graduated in 1999 from the long program in screenwriting at L’Inis, where she also later worked as a trainer. She holds a Ph.D. in film studies and teaches screenwriting, directing, and film production at the Université de Montréal as well as at L’Inis.

She has been actively involved in the artistic community for many years in various capacities, including as an advisor, jury member, speaker, and master class instructor.

As a filmmaker, she wrote, directed, edited, and produced Le Garagiste (2015), Les salopes ou le sucre naturel de la peau (2018), and Inès (2022). In the fall of 2023, she wrote, directed, and edited Habiter la maison. These films, along with Le Ring, which she wrote in 2007, have been selected for numerous international festivals and have received several awards.

She is currently developing several projects, including Elles sèment (Lowik Productions), Debout (Caramel Films), Le chant des couleuvres (ACPAV), and Le rôle d’une vie (PDM).

Born and raised in Trois-Pistoles, Quebec, Beaulieu worked as a pharmacist until deciding to leave her job and return to film school.

Her first screenplay, Le ring, was directed by Anaïs Barbeau-Lavalette in 2007. She also later wrote and directed the short films Qui, Coupable and Le Vide before making Le Garagiste, whose central theme of a man coming to terms with his mortality while suffering from kidney disease was inspired by one of her final clients as a pharmacist.

Beaulieu was also the editor of Le Garagiste. At the 4th Canadian Screen Awards in 2016, she was a nominee for Best Editing.

== Filmography ==
- Adrien (Le Garagiste) - 2015
- Les Salopes, or the Naturally Wanton Pleasure of Skin (Les salopes ou le sucre naturel de la peau) - 2018
- Inès - 2021
- Being at Home (Habiter la maison) - 2024
