= A Christmas Storm =

2024 Canadian film directed by Alain Chicoine

- French: Le Cyclone de Noël
- Directed by: Alain Chicoine
- Written by: Dominic Anctil; Marie-Élène Grégoire; Louis-Philippe Rivard
- Produced by: Mélanie Viau
- Starring: Christine Beaulieu; Véronique Cloutier; Danielle Proulx; Emi Chicoine; Patrick Hivon
- Cinematography: François Laplante-Delagrave
- Edited by: Martin Gravel
- Music by: Jean-Sébastien Houle
- Production company: KOTV Productions
- Distributed by: Les Films Opale
- Release date: November 8, 2024
- Running time: 90 minutes
- Country: Canada
- Language: French

A Christmas Storm (French: Le Cyclone de Noël) is a Canadian comedy film, directed by Alain Chicoine and released in 2024.

A spinoff of the television series L'Œil du cyclone, the film centres on Isabelle Gagnon (Christine Beaulieu) scrambling to preserve her family's Christmas traditions. Her mother Louise (Danielle Proulx) has planned a trip to Florida with her boyfriend Michel (Luc Senay); her oldest daughter Jade (Emi Chicoine) is planning to have Christmas dinner with her boyfriend's family; and her younger children Emma (Juliette Aubé) and Jules (Joey Bélanger) have been invited to spend the holiday in New York City with their father Jean-François (Patrick Hivon) and his new wife Mylène (Catherine Souffront). Isabelle thus enlists her sister Éliane (Véronique Cloutier) to help sabotage everybody's plans so that she doesn't have to spend Christmas alone.

The cast also includes Dominic Paquet, Étienne Lou, Louise Portal, Sonia Vachon, Pierre Verville, Carmen Sylvestre and Michèle Richard in supporting roles.

== Production ==
The film was shot in Montreal in spring 2024.

== Distribution ==
The film premiered on November 8, 2024. It surpassed the $1 million benchmark for box office success in the Quebec market within two weeks of its release, and passed the $2 million mark after four weeks.
