= The Botanist (film) =

- Directed by: Maude Plante-Husaruk; Maxime Lacoste-Lebuis
- Produced by: Maude Plante-Husaruk; Maxime Lacoste-Lebuis
- Cinematography: Maude Plante-Husaruk
- Edited by: Maude Plante-Husaruk
- Music by: Maxime Lacoste-Lebuis
- Production company: Les Films du 3 mars
- Release date: June 25, 2016 (AFI Docs)
- Running time: 20 minutes
- Country: Canada
- Language: Russian

The Botanist is a 2016 Canadian documentary short film, directed by Maude Plante-Husaruk and Maxime Lacoste-Lebuis. The film is a portrait of Raïmberdi, a Tajik botanist who built his own private hydroelectric power station to serve his family and community during the famine that followed the collapse of the Soviet Union.

The film premiered in June 2016 at AFI Docs. It was later screened at the 2016 Montreal International Documentary Festival, where it won the award for Best Canadian Short or Medium-Length Film.

The film was named to the Toronto International Film Festival's annual year-end Canada's Top Ten list for 2017.
