= Matthieu Bouchard =

Matthieu Bouchard is a Canadian film editor based in Quebec. He should not be confused with Mathieu Bouchard-Malo, also a Canadian film editor.

== Awards ==
Award	Ceremony	Category	Work	Result	Ref(s)
Canadian Screen Awards	2026	Best Editing	Two Women (Deux femmes en or) with Chloé Robichaud	Pending	
Prix Iris	2025	Best Editing	Two Women (Deux femmes en or) with Chloé Robichaud	Nominated	
Canadian Cinema Editors	2019	Best Editing in TV Comedy	Like-moi	Nominated	
Canadian Cinema Editors	2019	Best Editing in TV Comedy	Léo	Nominated	
Canadian Cinema Editors	2020	Best Editing in TV Comedy	Like-moi	Nominated	
Canadian Cinema Editors	2026	Best Editing in a Feature Film	The Furies (Les Furies) with Isabelle Malenfant	Nominated	
Gémeaux Awards	2018	Best Editing, Dramatic	Fugueuse	Won	
Gémeaux Awards	2019	Best Editing, Comedy	Like-moi with Olivier Binette	Won	
