= Stéphane Larue =

Canadian novelist from Quebec (born 1983)

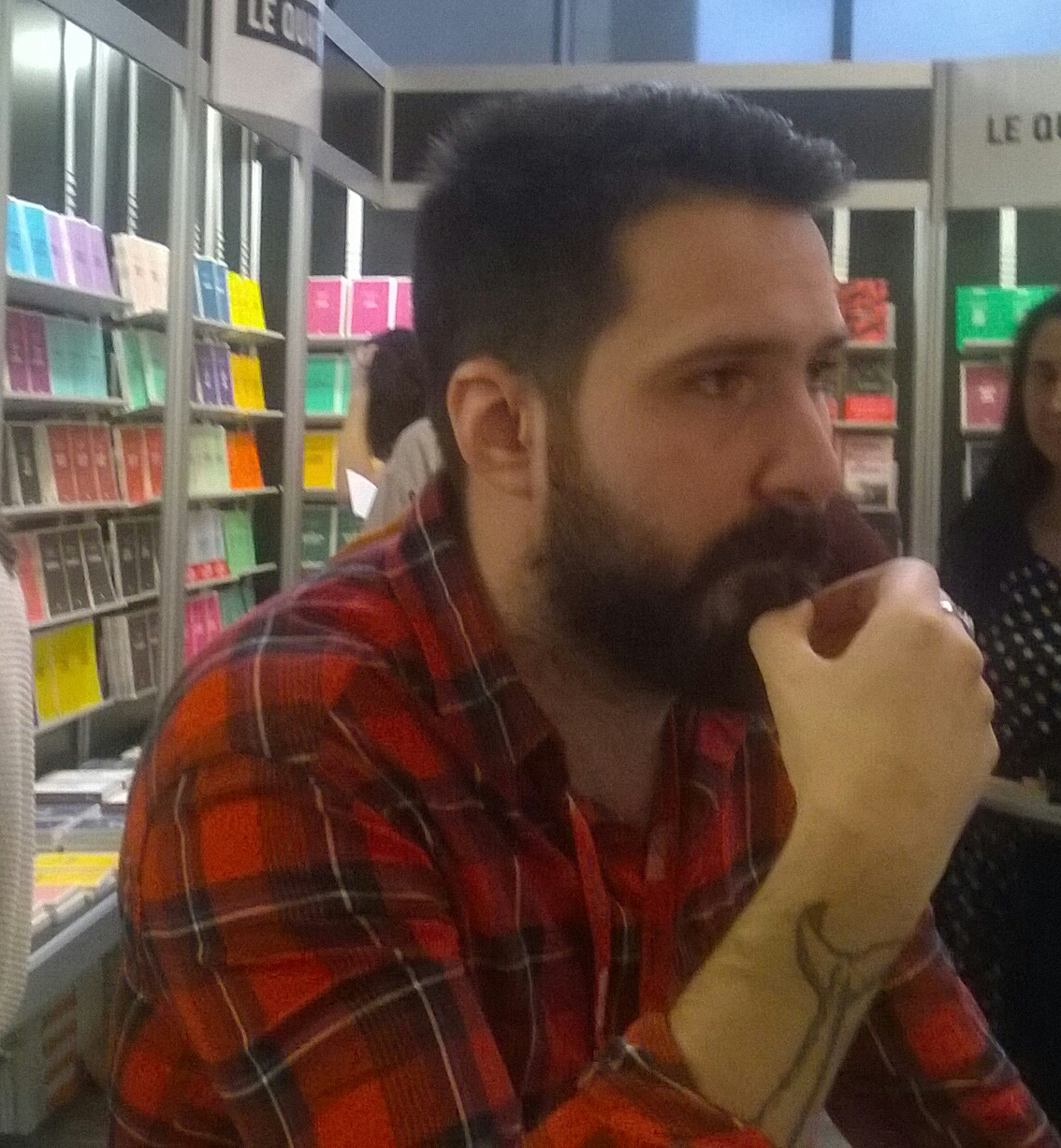
- Born: 1983 (age 42–43); Longueuil, Quebec, Canada
- Occupation: novelist
- Writing career
- Period: 2010s-present
- Notable work: The Dishwasher

Stéphane Larue (born 1983 in Longueuil, Quebec) is a Canadian novelist from Quebec. His debut novel, Le Plongeur, was a shortlisted finalist for the Governor General's Award for French-language fiction at the 2017 Governor General's Awards.

The novel also won the Prix des libraires du Québec and the Prix Senghor.

The Dishwasher, a translation of Le Plongeur by Pablo Strauss, was published on August 6, 2019 by Biblioasis. The translated edition won the Amazon.ca First Novel Award in 2020.

The Dishwasher, a film adaptation by Francis Leclerc, premiered in 2023.
