= Stay (2013 film) =

- Directed by: Wiebke von Carolsfeld
- Written by: Wiebke von Carolsfeld
- Based on: Stay by Aislinn Hunter
- Produced by: Andrew Boutilier; David Colins; Martina Nilan; Martin Paul-Hus; Mark Slone
- Starring: Aidan Quinn; Taylor Schilling
- Cinematography: Ronald Plante
- Edited by: Yvann Thibaudeau
- Music by: Robert Marcel Lepage
- Distributed by: Entertainment One
- Release date: 9 September 2013 (TIFF)
- Running time: 99 minutes
- Countries: Canada; Ireland
- Language: English

Stay is a 2013 film directed by Wiebke von Carolsfeld, who adapted the story from the Aislinn Hunter novel. The movie stars Aidan Quinn and Taylor Schilling, as an Irish former college professor and his Canadian former student, who live together in an Irish village. It is a Canadian-Irish drama film co-production.

== Plot ==
Troubled young woman Abbey falls in love with her former professor, Dermot. The mismatched couple are very much in love, living in a small village in Ireland where the villagers disapprove of their relationship – but they remain content with their situation.

When Abbey suddenly gets pregnant and is considering keeping the baby, Dermot becomes irritated with her, angrily telling her that he made it clear he has no interest in being a father. Following the announcement of her pregnancy, Abbey returns to her childhood home in Montreal to visit her father. Meanwhile, Dermot is deeply upset by her absence and lack of communication, he resorts to drinking.

Eventually, dark secrets are revealed about the two individuals. Dermot doesn't want to be a father, as a previous pregnancy with a student ended with her killing herself after putting the baby up for adoption. The incident also cost him his teaching position at Trinity College Dublin. Abbey is unsure about being a mother, as her own mother ran off with a man to Costa Rica when Abbey was a child. She decides to have an abortion after learning, from a friend of her mother, that there was no lover, that her mother left because she hated being a mother to Abbey – a secret her father hid from her.

After the abortion, and back alley sex with a bartender she likes, Abbey returns to Ireland to be with Dermot.

== Cast ==
- Aidan Quinn as Dermot Fay
- Taylor Schilling as Abbey
- Barry Keoghan as Sean Meehan
- Nika McGuigan as Deirdre McGilloway
- Chris McHallem as Michael
- Brian Gleeson as Liam Meehan
- Pascale Montpetit as Céline
- Michael Ironside as Frank

== Production ==
The film is a joint Canadian-Irish production by Amerique Film, Samson Films and Submission Films. The producers are Martin Paul-Hus, David Collins, Andrew Boutillier and Martina Niland, and the executive producer is Mark Slone. Stay was filmed in Connemara, Ireland and Montréal, Canada.

== Reception ==
On the review aggregator website Rotten Tomatoes, 24% of 17 critics' reviews are positive. Metacritic, which uses a weighted average, assigned the film a score of 48 out of 100, based on 7 critics, indicating "mixed or average" reviews.
