= Normand D'Amour =

Canadian actor

- Born: September 22, 1962 (age 63); Montreal, Quebec, Canada
- Occupation: Actor
- Years active: 1985–present

Normand D'Amour (born September 22, 1962) is a Canadian actor from Montreal, Quebec. He is most noted for his supporting role in the film Everything Is Fine (Tout est parfait), for which he won the Jutra Award for Best Supporting Actor at the 11th Jutra Awards in 2009, and was nominated for the Genie Award for Best Supporting Actor at the 29th Genie Awards.

== Career ==
D'Amour has also appeared in other works including Cheech, Maman Last Call, Ice Cream, Chocolate and Other Consolations (Crème glacée, chocolat et autres consolations), Piché: The Landing of a Man (Piché, entre ciel et terre), Adrien (Le Garagiste), Les Salopes, or the Naturally Wanton Pleasure of Skin, Looking for Alexander, Goddess of the Fireflies (La déesse des mouches à feu) and Drunken Birds (Les Oiseaux ivres).

== Filmography ==
=== Film ===
Year	Title	Role	Notes
2001	Ice Cream, Chocolate and Other Consolations (Crème glacée, chocolat et autres consolations)	Denis	
2003	Evil Words (Sur le seuil)	Louis Archambault	
2004	Happy Camper (Camping sauvage)	Bruno Bédard	
2004	Looking for Alexander (Mémoires affectives)	Père	
2004	Bonzaïon	Police en chef	
2005	Maman Last Call	Paul	
2006	May God Bless America (Que Dieu bénisse l'Amérique)	Gaétan Proulx	
2006	Cheech	Gaétan	
2008	Everything Is Fine (Tout est parfait)	Henri	
2009	Impasse	Richard Thomson	
2009	Father and Guns (De père en flic)	Père Rockeur - Roberto	
2009	5150 Elm's Way (5150, rue des Ormes)	Jacques Beaulieu	
2009	The Dark Room (La chambre noire)	Pascal	
2010	Piché: The Landing of a Man (Piché, entre ciel et terre)	Le thérapeuthe	
2011	See How They Dance (Voyez comme ils dansent)	Lee Atlee	
2011	Fear of Water (La Peur de l'eau)	Denis Gingras	
2014	Real Lies (Le vrai du faux)	Jacques Lebel	
2015	Adrien (Le Garagiste)	Adrien	
2017	Origami	Paul Marceau	
2018	Les Salopes, or the Naturally Wanton Pleasure of Skin (Les salopes ou le sucre naturel de la peau)	Alexandre	
2020	Goddess of the Fireflies (La déesse des mouches à feu)	Le père	
2021	Drunken Birds (Les Oiseaux ivres)	Normand	

=== Television ===
Year	Title	Role	Notes
1991	Lance et compte: Le moment de vérité	Marco	Television film
1994	Les grands procès	Me Bertrand	Episode: "L'Affaire Dion"
1995	Une petite fille particulière	Vincent	Television film
1995	Avec un grand A	Martin Audet	Episode: "La cigogne"
1996	Marguerite Volant	Laval Chevigny	8 episodes
2000	15 Secondes	Claude	Television film
2003	Un gars, une fille	Le couple accidenté	Episode: "L'accrochage en auto"
2004	The Last Casino	Wilson	Television film
2005	Les Invincibles	Bobby	4 episodes
2006	3 x rien	Le patron	2 episodes
2006	Caméra Café	Marcel	Episode #4.15
2007	Casse-croûte chez Albert	Normand	Miniseries
2009	He Shoots, He Scores	Dr Landry / Docteur	4 episodes
2009–2015	Yamaska	William Harrison	40 episodes
2011–2012	Trauma	Sylvain Martel	8 episodes
2014, 2017	Les beaux malaises	Denis	2 episodes
2015–2016	Mensonges	Phil Walker	12 episodes
2017–2019	Ruptures	Jean-Lu De Vries	11 episodes
2018	Demain Des Hommes	Robert Dion	10 episodes
2019	Le Killing	Toupie	Episode: "Flocon d'avoine"
2019–2020	Le 422	Ray	13 episodes
2020	En tout cas	Luc	5 episodes
2021	Lac-Noir	Eddy	8 episodes
2022-	Stat	Pascal St-Cyr	
