= Humus (film) =

- Directed by: Carole Poliquin
- Written by: Carole Poliquin
- Produced by: Carole Poliquin
- Starring: Mélina Plante; François D'Aoust
- Cinematography: Geoffroy Beauchemin
- Edited by: Martin Morissette
- Music by: Delphine Measroch
- Production company: ISCA Productions
- Distributed by: Maison 4:3
- Release date: May 20, 2022
- Running time: 94 minutes
- Country: Canada
- Language: French

Humus is a Canadian documentary film, directed by Carole Poliquin and released in 2022. The film centres on Mélina Plante and François D'Aoust, a farming couple in Havelock, Quebec, who are implementing sustainable agriculture techniques on their farm in response to the high worldwide risk of topsoil erosion.

The film premiered on May 20, 2022, in Montreal.

Delphine Measroch received a Canadian Screen Award nomination for Best Original Music in a Documentary at the 11th Canadian Screen Awards, and Geoffroy Beauchemin received a Prix Iris nomination for Best Cinematography in a Documentary at the 25th Quebec Cinema Awards.
