= Noemie Says Yes =

2022 Canadian drama film

- French: Noémie dit oui
- Directed by: Geneviève Albert
- Written by: Geneviève Albert
- Produced by: Patricia Bergeron
- Starring: Kelly Depeault
- Cinematography: Léna Mill-Reuillard
- Edited by: Amélie Labrèche
- Music by: Frannie Holder
- Production company: Leitmotiv Films
- Distributed by: K Films Amérique
- Release date: April 29, 2022
- Running time: 113 minutes
- Country: Canada
- Language: French

Noemie Says Yes (French: Noémie dit oui) is a Canadian drama film, directed by Geneviève Albert and released in 2022. The film stars Kelly Depeault as Noémie, a teenage girl who gets drawn into prostitution after running away from a youth centre.

The cast also includes James-Edward Métayer, Geneviève Alarie, Sylvio Archambault, Megane Ayan, Badr Bahsis, Véronique Beaudet, Thara Hillary Benjamin, Myriam De Bonville, Anthony Bouchard, Alice Boucher, Diana Bérubé, Carole Chatel, Émi Chicoine, Rose Choinière, Dominique Denis, Sébastien Dodge, Sylvain Dupuis, Maxime Gibault and Jérémie Earp.

The film opened in theatres on April 29, 2022. The provincial film review board restricted the film to viewers 16 years of age and older, a decision which Albert criticized on the grounds, that it was important to educate young girls about the dangers of prostitution because of their vulnerability to being lured into it.

== Awards ==
Award	Date of ceremony	Category	Recipient(s)	Result	Ref(s)
Angoulême Francophone Film Festival	2022	Valois Student Film Award	Geneviève Albert	Won	
Angoulême Francophone Film Festival	2022	Special Jury Citation for Performance	Kelly Depeault	Honored	
Canadian Screen Awards	2023	Best Lead Performance in a Film	Kelly Depeault	Nominated	
Canadian Screen Awards	2023	John Dunning Best First Feature Award	Geneviève Albert	Nominated	
Prix Iris	December 10, 2023	Best Film	Patricia Bergeron	Nominated	
Prix Iris	December 10, 2023	Best Actress	Kelly Depeault	Won	
Prix Iris	December 10, 2023	Revelation of the Year	Émi Chicoine	Nominated	
Prix Iris	December 10, 2023	Best First Film	Geneviève Albert	Nominated	
