= Victoire (2023 film) =

- French: La Cordonnière
- Directed by: François Bouvier
- Written by: Sylvain Guy
- Based on: La Cordonnière by Pauline Gill
- Produced by: André Rouleau; Valérie d’Auteuil
- Starring: Rose-Marie Perreault; Pierre-Yves Cardinal
- Cinematography: François Dutil
- Edited by: Michel Arcand
- Music by: Benoît Charest
- Production company: Caramel Films
- Distributed by: Les Films Opale
- Release date: March 17, 2023
- Running time: 102 minutes
- Country: Canada
- Language: French

Victoire (French: La Cordonnière) is a Canadian drama film, directed by François Bouvier and released in 2023. Adapted from Pauline Gill's series of historical novels about the life of Victoire Du Sault, a 19th-century shoemaker in Montreal who was one of Quebec's first women ever to launch her own business, the film stars Rose-Marie Perreault as Du Sault, and centres on her early romantic relationship with older businessman Georges-Noël Dufresne (Pierre-Yves Cardinal) before being married off to his son Thomas (Nicolas Fontaine).

The cast also includes Élise Guilbault in a small role as Victoire in her older age, as well as Madeleine Péloquin, Jeff Boudreault, Anick Lemay, Henri Picard, Nicolas Fontaine, Frédéric Millaire-Zouvi, Antoine Pilon, Martin Larocque, Louis-Georges Girard, Samuel Bouchard, Janie Faucher-Roy, Gabriel Sabourin, Éric Cabana and Marcel Sabourin in supporting roles.

The film opened theatrically in March 2023, before being added to video on demand platforms in May.

== Critical response ==
Maxime Demers of Le Journal de Montréal rated the film 3 out of 5, praising it as technically well-made but criticizing the fact that it focused far too strongly on Du Sault's romantic life rather than her actual accomplishments as a pioneering businesswoman.

Marc-André Lussier of La Presse offered a similar assessment, noting that because the real-life Victoire Du Sault is relatively little-known to contemporary audiences, the film was essentially missing a chapter in her life by focusing on her family dramas rather than her career.

== Awards ==
| Award | Date of ceremony | Category | Recipient(s) | Result | Ref(s) |
|---|---|---|---|---|---|
| Prix Iris | December 10, 2023 | Best Costume Design | Mariane Carter | Nominated | |
| Prix Iris | December 10, 2023 | Best Hair | Richard Hansen, Réjean Forget, Johanne Hansen | Won | |
| Prix Iris | December 10, 2023 | Best Visual Effects | Marc Hall | Nominated | |
