= 5150 Elm's Way =

- Official Teaser Poster
- Directed by: Éric Tessier
- Written by: Patrick Senécal
- Produced by: Pierre Even; Josée Vallée
- Starring: René-Daniel Dubois; Marc-André Grondin
- Cinematography: François Dutil
- Edited by: Alain Baril
- Music by: Christian Clermont
- Production companies: Melrose Studios; Cirrus Communications
- Distributed by: Alliance Vivafilm
- Release date: 9 October 2009
- Running time: 110 minutes
- Country: Canada
- Language: French

5150 Elm's Way (French: 5150, rue des Ormes) is a 2009 Canadian psychological horror film directed by Éric Tessier and starring René-Daniel Dubois and Marc-André Grondin. It is based on a novel with the same name, written by author Patrick Senécal.

== Plot ==
Elm's Way is a calm street in a small town. When Yannick falls from his bike, he knocks on the door of the Beaulieu residence, to call a cab home. Entering the house, Yannick hears a man screaming upstairs. When he finally encounters the source of the screams, he realizes that Beaulieu has wounded the man and was holding him hostage. Beaulieu then locks down Yannick in fear of him calling the police. Over time, he learns Beaulieu is a righteous psychopath and fanatical chess player who kills drug-dealers, pedophiles and other bad people for a better world.

Weeks pass and Yannick remains a prisoner, though is otherwise not mistreated by Beaulieu. He tries to escape, but is recaptured by Beaulieu's daughter Michelle, who breaks his leg. As he has done nothing wrong, Beaulieu doesn't want to kill Yannick and eventually agrees to let him go if he wins a game of chess against him, Beaulieu having never lost a game in his life so far. They play chess constantly, but Yannick never wins, though he rattles Beaulieu by once managing a draw. After Beaulieu's wife and daughter finally stand up to Beaulieu, they free Yannick. But Yannick has gone mad sitting locked in the room playing chess games against Beaulieu and doesn't leave, believing that the only option to stop Beaulieu is to win against him.

In the final showdown, the two play a chess game in the cellar, where Beaulieu has conserved all of his victims and placed them as pieces on a giant chessboard. During the game, Beaulieu's little stepdaughter enters the cellar and witnesses her dead mother placed as a piece on the chessboard. She is then shot accidentally by Beaulieu, which renders him catatonic. The police arrive, free Yannick and arrest Beaulieu. Four months later, Yannick is still madly obsessed with the interrupted chess game, so thoroughly consumed by the thought of the final position that he alienates himself from his girlfriend.

== Cast ==
- Marc-André Grondin as Yannick Bérubé
- Normand D'Amour as Jacques Beaulieu
- Sonia Vachon as Maude
- Mylène St-Sauveur as Michelle
- Élodie Larivière as Anne
- Catherine Bérubé as Josée
- Normand Chouinard as Jérome Bérubé
- Louise Bombardier as Francine Bérubé
- Pierre-Luc Lafontaine as Simon
- René-Daniel Dubois as M. Ruel

== Production ==
The film was filmed at Melrose Studios in Saint-Hubert, Québec, Canada.

=== Awards ===
Éric Tessier won for his script the Audience Award at the Gérardmer Film Festival and Joan-Patricia Parris was nominated for the Jutra Award for the best make-up.

== Release ==
The film premiered on 9 October 2009 in Canada.
