= Pierre-Yves Cardinal =

Canadian actor

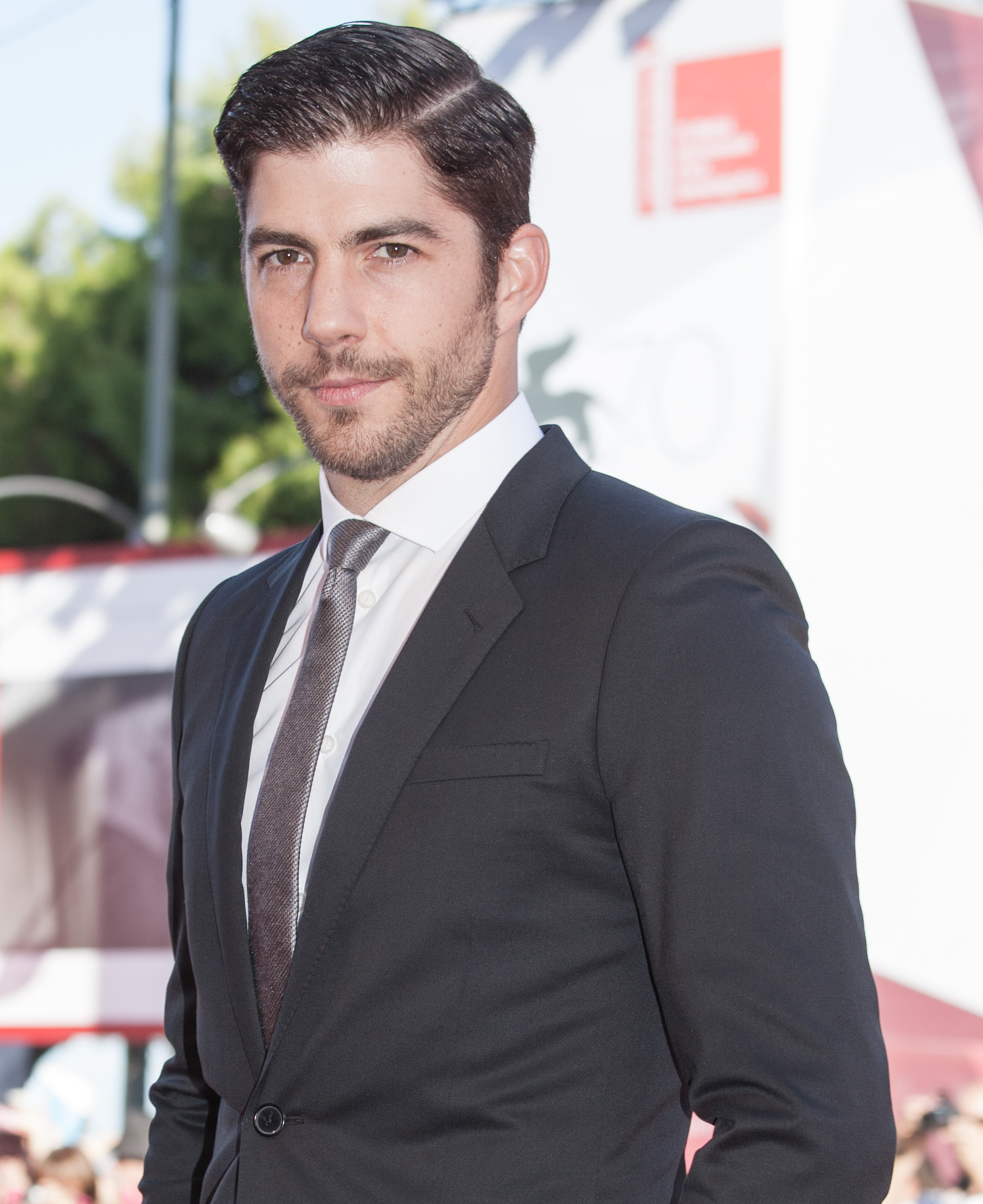
- Cardinal in 2013
- Born: 24 July 1978 (age 48)
- Occupation: Actor
- Known for: Tom at the Farm

Pierre-Yves Cardinal (born 24 July 1978) is a Canadian film and television actor from Quebec. He is most noted for his role as Francis in Xavier Dolan's Tom at the Farm, for which he received a Canadian Screen Award nomination as Best Supporting Actor at the 2nd Canadian Screen Awards, and won a Jutra Award as Best Supporting Actor at the 17th Jutra Awards.

He received a Prix Iris nomination for Best Actor at the 26th Quebec Cinema Awards for The Nature of Love (Simple comme Sylvain).

== Filmography ==
=== Film ===
Year	Title	Role	Notes
2009	Polytechnique	Éric	
2009	Through the Mist (Dédé à travers les brumes)	Jean	
2014	Tom at the Farm (Tom à la ferme)	Francis	
2015	Adrien (Le Garagiste)	Raphaël	
2015	Anna	Samuel	
2016	A Kid (Le Fils de Jean)	Ben	
2017	Venus	Daniel	
2018	Les Salopes, or the Naturally Wanton Pleasure of Skin (Les salopes ou le sucre naturel de la peau)	Mathéo	
2019	Savage State (L'État sauvage)	Samuel	
2020	Nadia, Butterfly	Sébastien	
2021	Sam		
2021	Goodbye Happiness (Au revoir le bonheur)	Philippe Lambert	
2023	The Nature of Love (Simple comme Sylvain)	Sylvain Tanguay	
2023	Victoire (La Cordonnière)	Georges-Noël Dufresne	
2025	The Wonderers	TBA	
2025	My Stepmother Is a Witch (Ma belle-mère est une sorcière)	Marcel Rivard	
2026	L'Autre	Stan	

=== Television ===
Year	Title	Role	Notes
2013	Trauma	Dr. Dancevik	One episode
2011-13	19-2		Three episodes
2014	Les Jeunes loups	Philippe St-Pierre	Ten episodes
