= Kelly Depeault =

Canadian actress

- Born: May 6, 2002 (age 24); Sherbrooke, Quebec, Canada
- Occupation: Actress
- Years active: 2013–present
- Notable work: Goddess of the Fireflies, Noemie Says Yes
- Awards: Prix Iris for Revelation of the Year (2021)

Kelly Depeault (born May 6, 2002) is a Canadian actress from Sherbrooke, Quebec.

== Biography ==
Originally from the Eastern Townships region, Kelly Depeault enjoyed re-enacting movie scenes as a child. She was introduced to singing by her older sister, Lydia Dépeault, before joining Les Petits Chanteurs de Trois-Rivières choir.

In 2013, she made her first television appearance in the show En route vers le gala Artis. That same year, she landed the lead role in a Leucan commercial, before joining the cast of Les Enfants Roy in 2014. At the same time, she won several singing competitions, where she made a name for herself with a song written for her, called Raconte-moi encore.

In 2016, Depeault began her career in television, participating in the series L'Échappée in the role of Claudie. She acted in various short and feature films including Le dernier jour (2018) and Vacarme (2020).

Depeault is most noted for her performance in the 2020 film Goddess of the Fireflies (La déesse des mouches à feu), for which she won the Prix Iris for Revelation of the Year at the 23rd Quebec Cinema Awards in 2021.

In 2023, she received a Canadian Screen Award nomination for Best Lead Performance in a Film at the 11th Canadian Screen Awards, and won the Prix Iris for Best Actress at the 25th Quebec Cinema Awards, for her performance in Noemie Says Yes (Noémie dit oui).

== Filmography ==
=== Television ===
- Since 2016 : L'Échappée by Myriam Bouchard, François Bégin and Yan England: Claudie Lyndsay
- 2019: OFF : Marie-Noëlle
- 2024 : Une amitié dangereuse (mini-serie) by Alain Tasma : Marie de Rohan
- 2024 :Stat:Rose

=== Cinema ===
- 2018 : Le dernier jour by Louis-Charles Blais : Lorence (short film)
- 2019 : Je suis amoureuse de mes souvenirs by Etienne Galloy : Florence (short film)
- 2020 : Vacarme by Frédérick Neegan Trudel: Arielle
- 2021 : Goddess of the Fireflies (La Déesse des mouches à feu) by Anaïs Barbeau-Lavalette : Catherine
- 2021 : North of Albany by Marianne Farley : Martine
- 2022 : Noemie Says Yes (Noémie dit oui) by Geneviève Albert : Noémie
- 2026 : Redemptions (Rédemptions)
