= Goddess of the Fireflies =

2020 Canadian drama film

- Film poster
- French: La déesse des mouches à feu
- Directed by: Anaïs Barbeau-Lavalette
- Written by: Catherine Léger
- Based on: La déesse des mouches à feu by Geneviève Pettersen
- Produced by: Luc Vandal
- Starring: Kelly Depeault; Caroline Néron; Normand D'Amour
- Cinematography: Jonathan Decoste
- Edited by: Stéphane Lafleur
- Music by: Mathieu Charbonneau
- Production company: Coop Vidéo de Montréal
- Distributed by: Entract Films
- Release date: February 22, 2020 (Berlin)
- Running time: 105 minutes
- Country: Canada
- Language: French

Goddess of the Fireflies (French: La déesse des mouches à feu) is a Canadian drama film, directed by Anaïs Barbeau-Lavalette and released in 2020. An adaptation of the novel by Geneviève Pettersen, the film centres on the coming of age of Catherine (Kelly Depeault), a teenage girl living in a small town in Quebec in the early 1990s.

== Cast ==
The cast includes Caroline Néron and Normand D'Amour as Catherine's parents, Éléonore Loiselle as her best friend Marie-Ève, and Robin L'Houmeau, Noah Parker, Antoine DesRochers and Marine Johnson as her classmates.

== Production ==
Kelly Depeault was 17 years old at the time of filming the movie in which she has some nude and explicit sex scenes. While director Anaïs Barbeau-Lavalette admits that the shooting went smoothly, she also admits to having worked a lot with the actors during the sex scenes, which were the most delicate to stage according to her.

== Release ==
The film premiered in February 2020 at the 70th Berlin International Film Festival in the Generation 14plus program. It was subsequently screened at the 2020 Quebec City Film Festival, where it won the Grand Prix. It premiered commercially in Canada on September 25.

== Awards and nominations ==
| Award | Date of ceremony | Category | Recipient(s) | Result | Ref(s) |
|---|---|---|---|---|---|
| Canadian Screen Awards | May 20, 2021 | Best Adapted Screenplay | Catherine Léger | Nominated | |
| Canadian Screen Awards | May 20, 2021 | Best Art Direction/Production Design | André-Line Beauparlant | Nominated | |
| Canadian Screen Awards | May 20, 2021 | Best Stunt Coordination | Tyler Hall | Nominated | |
| Prix collégial du cinéma québécois | 2022 | Best Film | Goddess of the Fireflies | Nominated | |
| Prix Iris | June 6, 2021 | Best Film | Luc Vandal | Won | |
| Prix Iris | June 6, 2021 | Best Director | Anaïs Barbeau-Lavalette | Won | |
| Prix Iris | June 6, 2021 | Best Supporting Actor | Normand D'Amour | Nominated | |
| Prix Iris | June 6, 2021 | Best Supporting Actor | Robin L'Houmeau | Nominated | |
| Prix Iris | June 6, 2021 | Best Supporting Actress | Éléonore Loiselle | Nominated | |
| Prix Iris | June 6, 2021 | Best Supporting Actress | Caroline Néron | Won | |
| Prix Iris | June 6, 2021 | Revelation of the Year | Kelly Depeault | Won | |
| Prix Iris | June 6, 2021 | Best Screenplay | Catherine Léger | Nominated | |
| Prix Iris | June 6, 2021 | Best Cinematography | Jonathan Decoste | Nominated | |
| Prix Iris | June 6, 2021 | Best Editing | Stéphane Lafleur | Won | |
| Prix Iris | June 6, 2021 | Best Sound | Sylvain Bellemare, Paul Col, Bernard Gariépy Strobl, Martyne Morin | Nominated | |
| Prix Iris | June 6, 2021 | Best Hair | Johanne Paiement | Won | |
| Prix Iris | June 6, 2021 | Best Makeup | Kathryn Casault | Nominated | |
| Prix Iris | June 6, 2021 | Best Casting | Murielle La Ferrière, Marie-Claude Robitaille | Won | |
| Prix Iris | June 6, 2021 | Public Prize | Anaïs Barbeau-Lavalette, Luc Vandal, Catherine Léger | Nominated | |
| Prix Iris | June 6, 2021 | Most Successful Film Outside Quebec | Anaïs Barbeau-Lavalette, Luc Vandal, Catherine Léger | Nominated | |
| Quebec City Film Festival | September 2020 | Grand Prix | | Won | |
