= Jonathan Decoste =

Canadian cinematographer

Jonathan Decoste is a Canadian cinematographer. He is most noted for the film Goddess of the Fireflies (La déesse des mouches à feu), for which he received a Prix Iris nomination for Best Cinematography at the 23rd Quebec Cinema Awards in 2021.

His other credits include the films Rock Paper Scissors (Roche papier ciseaux), The Mirage (Le Mirage), Jouliks and White Dog (Chien blanc).
