= Fire-Jo-Ball =

- Directed by: Audrey Nantel-Gagnon
- Written by: Audrey Nantel-Gagnon
- Produced by: Nathalie Cloutier
- Starring: Jo-Ann Thibault
- Cinematography: Cloé Lafortune; Jacob Marcoux; Jordan Choinière; Jérémie Mazan
- Edited by: Rébécca Gagnon-Paolitto
- Production company: National Film Board of Canada
- Release date: March 2023 (Regard)
- Running time: 16 minutes
- Country: Canada
- Language: French

Fire-Jo-Ball is a Canadian short documentary film, directed by Audrey Nantel-Gagnon and released in 2023. The film is a portrait of Jo-Ann Thibault, a 57-year-old bartender who is pursuing her long-held dream of becoming a singer and actress, depicting both her efforts to establish her career and the personal and mental health challenges that have held her back.

The film premiered at the 2023 Saguenay International Short Film Festival.

== Awards ==
Award	Date of ceremony	Category	Recipient(s)	Result	Ref(s)
Prix Iris	December 10, 2023	Best Short Documentary	Audrey Nantel-Gagnon, Nathalie Cloutier	Nominated	
