= Two Women in Gold =

1970 film by Claude Fournier

- French: Deux femmes en or
- Directed by: Claude Fournier
- Written by: Claude Fournier; Marie-José Raymond
- Produced by: Claude Fournier; Pierre Lamy
- Starring: Monique Mercure; Louise Turcot
- Cinematography: Claude Fournier
- Edited by: Claude Fournier
- Music by: Robert Charlebois
- Production company: Les Films Claude Fournier
- Distributed by: France Film
- Release date: May 21, 1970
- Running time: 106 minutes
- Country: Canada
- Language: French
- Budget: $225,000
- Box office: $4 million

Two Women in Gold (French: Deux femmes en or) is a Canadian sex comedy film, directed by Claude Fournier and released in 1970.

== Plot ==
Fernande Turcot and Violette Lamoureux are two housewives in suburban Brossard, Quebec, who are trapped in unfulfilling marriages to husbands Yvon and Bob, and deal with their frustrations by beginning to have casual sex with the delivery or repair men who come to their houses.

== Cast ==
- Monique Mercure - Fernande Turcot
- Louise Turcot - Violette Lamoureux
- Marcel Sabourin - Yvon-T. Turcot
- Donald Pilon - Bob Lamoureux
- Vincent Fournier - Vincent Turcot
- Francine Morand - Miss Cinéma
- Yvon Deschamps - M. Téléphone
- Donald Lautrec - M. Lait
- Gilles Latulippe - M. Jolicoeur
- Réal Béland - le reaconteur de blagues
- Janine Sutto - Mme Lalonde
- Paul Buissonneau - M. Plátre
- Jean Lapointe - le sergent détective Poivrot
- Paul Berval - M. Tapis
- Georges Groulx - François-Xavier Lalonde
- Raymond Lévesque
- Michel Chartrand - judge

== Production ==
Two Women in Gold was filmed from 24 November 1969, to 9 January 1970, on a budget of $225,000 (equivalent to $1,819,951 in 2025). The French version was 107 minutes and 20 seconds long while the English dub was reduced to 90 minutes and 30 seconds.

== Release ==
The film was released in Montreal on 21 May 1970, by France Film and grossed $4 million (equivalent to $32,354,680 in 2025).

== Reception ==
Although not immediately popular with critics, the film was a significant commercial success, making at least $2 million at the box office in its initial run. Its success was part of a wave of films that reignited the commercial viability of the Cinema of Quebec, following a number of fallow years in the late 1960s. As of 2020, it was still recognized as one of the most commercially successful films in Quebec's cinematic history.

In 2022, Chloé Robichaud received a grant from Quebec's Société de développement des entreprises culturelles to produce a contemporary remake of the film. Two Women, with a screenplay by Catherine Léger, premiered at the 2025 Sundance Film Festival.

== Works cited ==
- Turner, D. John, ed. (1987). Canadian Feature Film Index: 1913-1985. Canadian Film Institute. ISBN 0660533642.
- Melnyk, George (2004). One Hundred Years of Canadian Cinema. University of Toronto Press. ISBN 080203568X.
