= Geographies of Solitude =

- Directed by: Jacquelyn Mills
- Produced by: Rosalie Chicoine Perreault; Jacquelyn Mills
- Starring: Zoe Lucas
- Cinematography: Jacquelyn Mills
- Edited by: Jacquelyn Mills
- Release date: February 12, 2022 (Berlinale)
- Running time: 103 minutes
- Country: Canada
- Language: English

Geographies of Solitude is a Canadian documentary film by Jacquelyn Mills that was released in 2022. The film is guided by Zoe Lucas, a naturalist and environmentalist who lives on Nova Scotia's Sable Island, where she catalogues the island's wild Sable Island horses, and endeavours to preserve its unique ecosystem.

Geographies of Solitude premiered at the 72nd Berlin International Film Festival.

== Accolades ==
At its premiere in Berlin, Geographies of Solitude won the Prize of the Ecumenical Jury, the CICAE Arthouse Cinema Award, and the Caligari Film Prize.

The film went on to have its Canadian premiere at the 2022 Hot Docs Canadian International Documentary Festival, where it won the Hot Docs Award for Best Canadian Feature Documentary, as well as the Earl A. Glick Emerging Canadian Filmmaker Award.

Geographies of Solitude was also screened at the 2022 Jeonju International Film Festival in South Korea, where it was the winner of the International Competition Grand Prize. It also won the award for Best Canadian Documentary Film at the 2022 Vancouver International Film Festival. Mills received a Canadian Screen Award nomination for Best Cinematography in a Documentary at the 11th Canadian Screen Awards in 2023.

In 2023, the film was the winner of the Prix Luc-Perreault from the Association québécoise des critiques de cinéma after being shown at the Rendez-vous Québec Cinéma. It was also a Prix Iris nominee for Best Documentary Film at the 25th Quebec Cinema Awards in 2023.

In 2024, the film was named a shortlisted finalist for the Prix collégial du cinéma québécois.

Mills was awarded Outstanding Artistry in Filmmaking at the Smithsonian in Washington, D.C. (2023). Geographies of Solitude went on to garner over 35 international awards, was nominated for an IDA as well as a Canadian Screen Award, has a permanent place in Harvard Film Archives and was a Critic's Pick in the New York Times.
