= Malartic (film) =

2024 Canadian documentary film

- Directed by: Nicolas Paquet
- Written by: Nicolas Paquet
- Produced by: Nathalie Cloutier; Nicolas Paquet
- Cinematography: Geoffroy Beauchemin; Benoît Ouellet; François Pesant
- Edited by: Natacha Dufaux
- Music by: Richard Desjardins
- Production company: National Film Board of Canada
- Release date: February 28, 2024 (RVQC)
- Running time: 89 minutes
- Country: Canada
- Language: French

Malartic is a Canadian documentary film, directed by Nicolas Paquet and released in 2024. The film is a portrait of the small mining town of Malartic, Quebec, centring on the extreme contrast between the wealth generated by Osisko Mining's open-pit mine in the town and the relative underdevelopment of the town and impoverishment of its residents.

It is a sequel to his earlier documentary film The Golden Rule (La Regle d'or), which profiled the upheaval wreaked by the original development of the mine, which required part of the town to be relocated.

The film premiered on February 28, 2024, at the Rendez-vous Québec Cinéma. It was subsequently screened at the Festival du cinéma documentaire de Gaspé Vues sur mer, where it won the Prix Caribou, before going into commercial release in April.

Some later screenings were also held as a double feature, alongside The Golden Rule.

== Awards ==
| Award | Date of ceremony | Category | Recipient(s) | Result | Ref. |
|---|---|---|---|---|---|
| Prix Iris | December 8, 2024 | Best Sound in a Documentary | Catherine Van Der Donckt, Isabelle Lussier, Richard Saindon, Guillaume Lévesque | Nominated | |
