= Dreams (1993 film) =

- Directed by: Karen Shakhnazarov; Alexander Borodyansky
- Written by: Karen Shakhnazarov; Alexander Borodyansky
- Produced by: Karen Shakhnazarov; Alexander Borodyansky
- Starring: Amaliya Mordvinova; Oleg Basilashvili; Armen Dzhigarkhanyan
- Cinematography: Boris Brozhovsky
- Music by: Anatoli Kroll
- Production company: Mosfilm
- Release date: 1993
- Running time: 78 min.
- Country: Russia
- Language: Russian

Dreams or (Russian: Сны, romanized: Sny) is a 1993 Russian fantastical absurdist comedy directed by Karen Shakhnazarov and Alexander Borodyansky.

== Plot ==
...Russia, end of the 19th century. Countess Prizorova suffers from strange dreams. In them the Countess becomes a dishwasher by the name of Masha Stepanova who works in a dirty Moscow eatery in 1993.

...Masha Stepanova has a pensioner husband, who shoots her nude and then sells these photos on the Arbat. Soon the president of Russia approaches Masha for help. An IMF representative is coming to Moscow and Stepanova who is appointed as Minister of Finance must seduce the foreigner to obtain favorable loans for Russia. However the provocation with Masha fails because of lustful Semyon Borisovich, accountant of the canteen where Stepanova works.

Count Prizorov, alarmed by his wife's condition, refers first to a famous doctor, and then, well, to a medium Monsieur Renoir. After the "magical" psychic session Prizorov explains that his wife has a prophetic gift: she dreams about what would happen in Russia a hundred years. The future of the country seems terrible: poverty, a general collapse, violence of criminals, foreign prostitutes, lack of spirituality... The shocked Count decides to take a desperate step: at the time of the report to the Emperor Nicholas II, Prizorov requires to immediately begin implementation of economic and social reforms because the current rate of the tsarist government will inevitably lead to revolution. Alas, the emperor and his entourage remain deaf to Prizorov's fiery speech, the Count is discharged and the course of history does not change...

== Cast ==
- Amaliya Mordvinova – Countess Prizorova / Maria Ivanovna Stepanova
- Oleg Basilashvili – Count Dmitry Prizorov
- Armen Dzhigarkhanyan – Doctor
- Arnold Ides – Semyon Borisovich, accountant of the dining room / Lieutenant general Ivan Ivanovich Rastorguev
- Pyotr Merkurev – Monsieur Renoir, medium
- Valery Nosik – Minister of Culture of Russia
- Aleksei Zharkov – Klotchkov, Colonel general and Deputy Minister of Defense of Russia
- Yuriy Sherstnyov – Ivan Kurochkin, Minister of Agriculture of Russia Doctor
- Andrei Rostotsky – Nicholas II of Russia
- Andrei Vertogradov – President of Russia
- Fred Hiatt – Dominique, baron and the representative of IMF
- Aleksandr Chislov – Oleg, member of the government of Russia
- Gennady Sharapov – bearded member of the government of Russia
- Victor Pomortsev – Edward, member of the government of Russia
- Gosha Kutsenko – Shtokman, tailor (uncredited)
- Ekaterina Obraztsova – Major Panteleyeva, head of security of country residences
- Marina Openkina – Paracha, Countess Prizorova's maid
- Aleksandr Loye – boy buying nudes

== See also ==
- Buddha's Little Finger (film)
