= Bleu comme un coup de feu =

- Film poster
- French: Bleu comme un coup de feu
- Directed by: Masoud Raouf
- Written by: Masoud Raouf
- Produced by: Marc Bertrand; Masoud Raouf
- Edited by: Oana Suteu Khintirian
- Music by: Robert Marcel Lepage
- Animation by: Masoud Raouf
- Production company: National Film Board of Canada
- Release date: August 27, 2003 (MWFF)
- Running time: 5 minutes
- Country: Canada

Bleu comme un coup de feu is a Canadian animated short film, directed by Masoud Raouf and released in 2003. Animated through paint on glass, the film illustrates the inhumanity and barbarity of war.

It won the Jutra Award for Best Animated Short Film at the 6th Jutra Awards in 2004.
