= Sundered =

2017 video game

- Developer: Thunder Lotus Games
- Publisher: Thunder Lotus Games
- Composer: Maxime Lacoste-Lebuis
- Engine: Unity
- Platforms: Windows; Mac OS X; Linux; PlayStation 4; Nintendo Switch; Xbox One; Stadia
- Release: Windows, PlayStation 4 July 28, 2017; Eldritch Edition; Switch, Xbox One; December 21, 2018; Stadia; May 26, 2020
- Genres: Roguelike, Metroidvania
- Mode: Single-player

Sundered is a Metroidvania video game developed and published by Canadian studio Thunder Lotus Games. It was released on July 28, 2017, for Windows, Mac OS, Linux, and PlayStation 4. A definitive version of the game, Sundered: Eldritch Edition, was released on December 21, 2018, for Nintendo Switch and Xbox One and on May 26, 2020, on Stadia.

== Gameplay ==
Sundered is a Metroidvania game in which the player must traverse a side-scrolling world and unlock new abilities to progress. These are unlocked at shrines, and the player can open shortcuts that provide a faster way across the game's world. The game makes use of some random elements, as enemy hordes will spawn randomly and try to attack the player. Additionally, after every death, the passages connecting the game's areas rearrange themselves using procedural generation.

The main character can use "Shards" gained from enemies to upgrade herself permanently using a skill tree. She can use "Elder Shards" that drop from bosses to sacrifice her humanity in order to gain more powerful abilities, such as turning into a gargoyle.

== Plot ==
The game makes heavy use of Lovecraftian horror elements.

The game opens with a woman, Eshe, wandering a desert in a sandstorm when, coming across mysterious ruins, she is pulled into the ground by a mysterious force. Falling into an ever-shifting underworld, Eshe encounters the Shining Trapezohedron, which grants her the power to defend herself. The two begin to travel the caves together.

As they progress, the Trapezohedron explains that their civilization, an Eldritch theocracy known as the Eschaton, was at war with an invading force known as the Valkyries, who used advanced technology to fight their eldritch magic. The final confrontation between the leaders of these two groups during a summoning ritual caused the ritual to fail, resulting in the remaining Eschaton to become monsters, the remaining Valkyries to become corrupted and fused to their war machines, and the landscape to become warped and unstable.

Eshe fights through the monsters and the machines, acquiring Valkyrie technology to help her attack enemies and navigate the underworld. As she does, she finds Elder Shards, fragments of the failed summoning ritual and vessels of eldritch energy. The Trapezohedron urges Eshe to allow it to use the Elder Shards to permanently "Corrupt" her abilities, making them more powerful but at the cost of her humanity. Alternatively, Eshe can use a Valkyrie incinerator to destroy the Elder Shards for bonuses to her base stats.

The game has three endings depending on what the player chooses to do with the collected Elder Shards.

If Eshe has used or destroyed only some of the Elder Shards, Eshe finally faces off against the Echaton's god, Nyarlethotep. Upon defeating it, a portal opens and Eshe is able to escape back to the desert. However, looking at her hand, she realizes in horror that the Shining Trapezohedron has come back with her, giving her the same greeting when they first met.

If Eshe has destroyed all seven Elder Shards, she again faces off against Nyarlethotep. However upon his defeat, the Shining Trapezohedron berates Eshe for refusing its help, and abandons her to merge with Nyarlethotep, revealing the god to be its true form. Eshe manages to defeat Nyarlethotep using the Valkyrie technology, but this causes the portal to shatter, leaving Eshe trapped in the caves in total darkness and devoid of life.

If Eshe allows the Shining Trapezohedron to use all seven Elder Shards to corrupt her abilities, Eshe faces off against a manifestation of her own discarded humanity, which appears first as a "pure" copy of herself, then as a shoggoth-like monster which had mutated and mutilated from using all 7 Elder Shards to remove her humanity. Destroying this allows Eshe to fuse with the Shining Trapezohedron, letting her become godlike and open a portal back to the desert, where under her direction, the world is flooded by eldritch darkness.

== Reception ==
Reception

Aggregate score
Aggregator	Score
Metacritic	PC: 74/100; PS4: 70/100; NS: 76/100

The game received overall positive reviews with an aggregate score of 74/100 on Metacritic. Leif Johnson of IGN rated the game 7.8/10, calling the game's hand drawn levels "impressive" and its boss fights "epic", but criticized the random enemy hordes as just leading to "random deaths" and said that the randomly generated levels were not the same quality as the pre-designed ones. Mike Williams of USgamer rated the game 4/5 stars, calling the game "beautiful" and also praising the sound design and ambient background music. He criticized the game for forcing the player to backtrack and expressed disappointment that achieving the "better" ending would likely mean forgoing the "cool" powers the player can use. Kyle LeClair of Hardcore Gamer rated the game 3/5, saying that the graphics were "gorgeous" and the atmosphere and story were well done, but calling the combat with regular enemies "horrible" due to the large groups that attack the player. He called it "a form of fake difficulty" that was substituted for challenge, and said that it harmed his impressions of the game heavily.

Eurogamer ranked the game 29th on their list of the "Top 50 Games of 2017".
