= Joan Hart (actress) =

Canadian actress

Joan Hart (born 1999) is a Canadian actress from Montreal, Quebec. She is most noted for her performance as Bonnie in the 2023 film The Dishwasher (Le plongeur), for which she received a Prix Iris nomination for Revelation of the Year at the 25th Quebec Cinema Awards.

She began her career as a teenager, appearing in the Centaur Theatre production of Beverley Cooper's play Innocence Lost. She later studied theatre at Dawson College, graduating in 2020.

Her other credits have included the films To Catch a Killer and Old Guys in Bed, and guest appearances in the television series This Life, Game On and Sorcières.
