= Pierre-Marcel Blanchot =

French film producer

Pierre-Marcel Blanchot is a French film producer. He is most noted as producer of the 2022 film Babysitter, which was a Canadian Screen Award nominee for Best Motion Picture at the 11th Canadian Screen Awards in 2023.
