= Jacquelyn Mills =

Canadian documentary filmmaker

Jacquelyn Mills is a Canadian documentary filmmaker. She is best known for her films In the Waves and Geographies of Solitude.

== Early life ==
Mills was born in Sydney, Nova Scotia.

== Career ==
In 2008, Mills' short film, For Wendy, won five international awards.

Mills' first documentary (60') In the Waves is a personal exploratory film made in collaboration with her grandmother. The film premiered at Visions du Réel in 2017. In the Waves won the award for Best Documentary and best editing at the 2017 Atlantic Film Festival and was selected as best medium-length documentary at RIDM (Montreal International Documentary Festival). It also won Grand Jury Prize at New Hampshire International Film Festival. The film was a shortlisted nominee for the Vancouver Film Critics Circle Award for Best Canadian Documentary at the Vancouver Film Critics Circle Awards 2017.

Geographies of Solitude, Mills second documentary (103'), premiered at Berlinale Forum in 2022 winning three awards. The film centers on environmentalist Zoe Lucas and her life on Sable Island. The film won the award for Best Canadian Feature Documentary at the 2022 Hot Docs Canadian International Documentary Festival , where Mills also won the Emerging Canadian Filmmaker award. Mills was also awarded Outstanding Artistry in Filmmaking at the Smithsonian in Washington, D.C. (2023). Geographies of Solitude went on to garner over 35 international awards, was nominated for an IDA as well as a Canadian Screen Award, has a permanent place in Harvard Film Archives and was a Critic's Pick in the New York Times.

In addition to her own films, Mills has also worked as a cinematographer and editor on many internationally acclaimed films.

== Personal life ==
Mills currently lives in Montreal.
