= Thunder Lotus Games =

Canadian video game development studio

- Logo used from 2014 to 2023
- Industry: Video games
- Founded: 2014
- Headquarters: Montreal, Quebec, Canada
- Key people: Will Dubé
- Products: Jotun; Sundered; Spiritfarer
- Number of employees: 33
- Website: thunderlotusgames.com

Thunder Lotus Games is an independent video game development studio based in Montreal, Canada. Founded in 2014, the company is most known for developing Jotun (2015), Sundered (2017) and Spiritfarer (2020).

== History ==
The studio was founded in 2014 after founder Will Dubé quit his original job at a mobile video game studio to launch his own project, Jotun on Kickstarter for funding. He originally wanted to name the studio "Lotus Games", though he ultimately avoided this name due to confusion with another company named Lotus Entertainment. The game had a successful crowdfunding campaign which raised over $64,000, surpassing Dubé's expectations. The game became a financial success after its launch in 2015, attracting more than 1 million players. The success of the first game allowed the company to start development on their next game, Sundered, a Metroidvania game inspired by Rogue Legacy and Super Metroid. It reached its crowdfunding target a day after its Kickstarter campaign was launched.

Following the release of Sundered, the company signed with investment fund Kowloon Nights for the release of their next game, Spiritfarer. It was a commercial success, selling more than 1 million copies. The company currently has 16 employees. 14 of them are full-time developers, while the remaining two are responsible for publishing the games.

== Games ==
Year	Title	Platform(s)	Genre(s)
2015	Jotun	PC, PlayStation 4, Wii U, Xbox One, Nintendo Switch, Stadia	Action-adventure, puzzle
2017	Sundered	PC, PlayStation 4, Xbox One, Nintendo Switch, Stadia	Roguelike, Metroidvania
2020	Spiritfarer	PC, PlayStation 4, Xbox One, Nintendo Switch, Stadia	Management simulation
2026	33 Immortals	PC, Xbox Series X/S	Action, roguelike
2027	At Fate's End	PC, PlayStation 5, Xbox Series X/S	Side-scrolling action-adventure
