= Oana Suteu Khintirian =

Canadian filmmaker

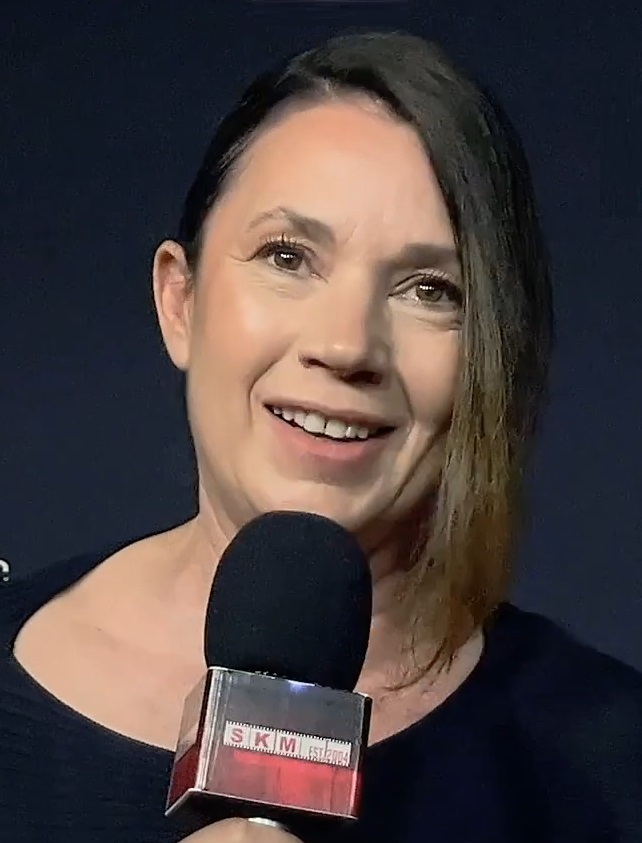
Oana Suteu at the 2024 Canadian Screen Awards

Oana Suteu Khintirian, also sometimes credited as Oana Suteu, is a Canadian film director and editor. She is of Armenian and Romanian origin. She is most noted as a two-time Prix Iris nominee for Best Editing in a Documentary, receiving nods at the 21st Quebec Cinema Awards in 2019 for Anote's Ark and at the 25th Quebec Cinema Awards in 2023 for Beyond Paper (Au-delà du papier).

She was also the director of Beyond Paper, as well as the 2012 short documentary film Paul-André Fortier. Her other credits as an editor have included the films Lipsett Diaries, Pink Ribbons, Inc., Blue Like a Gunshot (Bleu comme un coup de feu), Jutra, No Fish Where to Go (Nul poisson où aller) and Harvey
