= Geoffroy Beauchemin =

Canadian cinematographer

Geoffroy Beauchemin is a Canadian cinematographer from Quebec.

He received a Canadian Screen Award nomination for Best Cinematography in a Documentary at the 3rd Canadian Screen Awards in 2015 for The Sower (Le Semeur), and a Prix Iris nomination for Best Cinematography in a Documentary at the 25th Quebec Cinema Awards in 2023 for Humus.
