= Maxime de Cotret =

Canadian actor

Maxime de Cotret is a Canadian film and television actor from Quebec. He is most noted for his performance as Greg in the film The Dishwasher (Le Plongeur), for which he received a Prix Iris nomination for Best Supporting Actor at the 25th Quebec Cinema Awards in 2023.
