= Delphine Measroch =

Canadian composer

Delphine Measroch is a Canadian composer from Montreal, Quebec. She is most noted for her work on the film Humus, for which she received a Canadian Screen Award nomination for Best Original Music in a Documentary at the 11th Canadian Screen Awards in 2023.

Her other credits have included the films Puffball, On the Way to the Sea, Buddha's Little Finger and Slaxx.
