= Martin Paul-Hus =

Canadian film producer

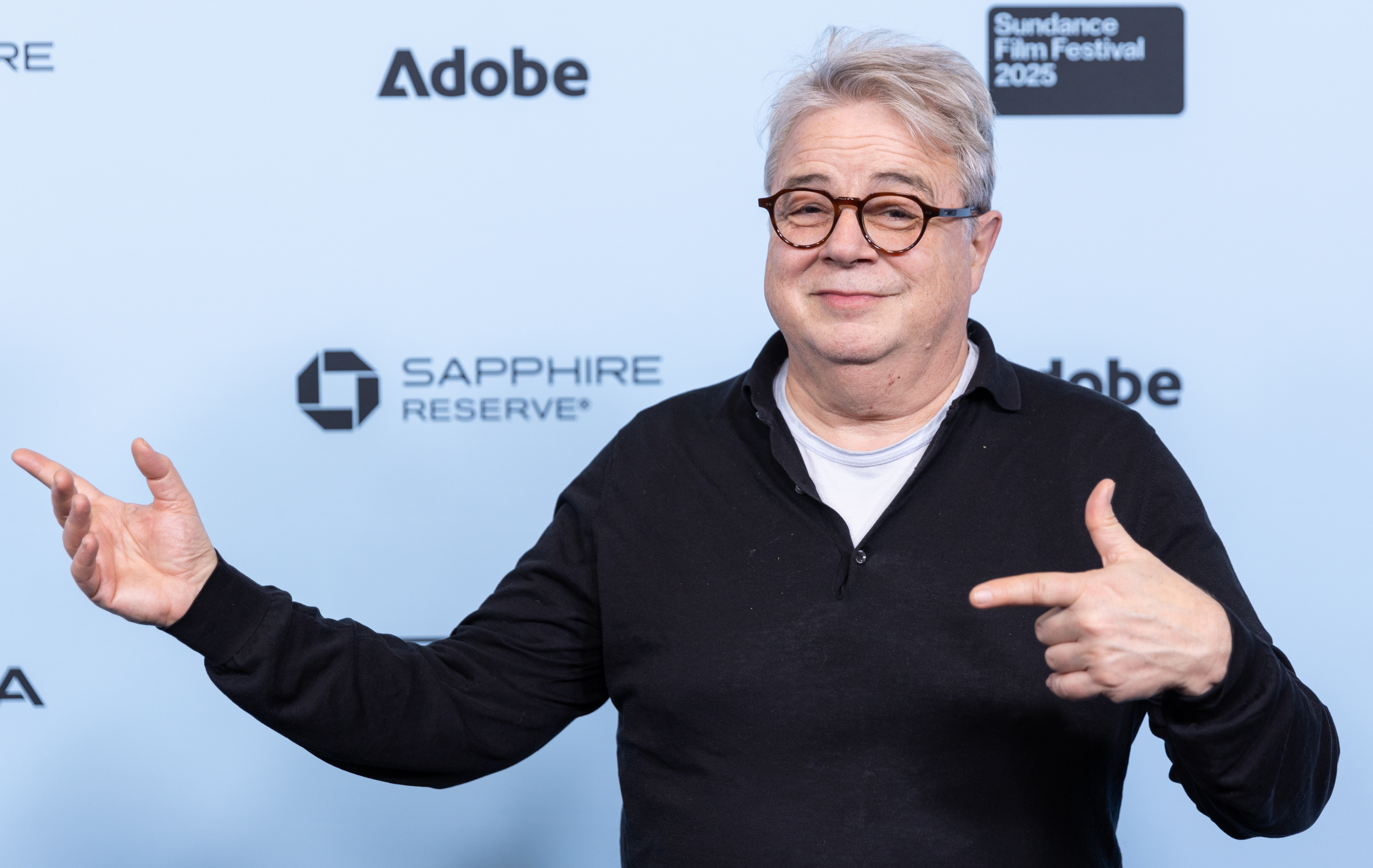
- Paul-Hus at the 2025 Sundance Film Festival
- Occupation: Film producer

Martin Paul-Hus is a Canadian film producer. He is most noted as producer of the films Eisenstein, which was a Genie Award nominee for Best Motion Picture at the 22nd Genie Awards in 2002, and Babysitter, which was a Canadian Screen Award nominee in the same category at the 11th Canadian Screen Awards in 2023.

A producer with Amérique Film, his other credits have included the films The Moving Statue (La liberté d'une statue), Puffball, Stay, Buddha's Little Finger, Slut in a Good Way (Charlotte a du fun), Peace by Chocolate, Song of Granite and Two Women (Deux femmes en or).
