= Geneviève Albert =

Canadian filmmaker

Geneviève Albert is a Canadian filmmaker from Quebec, whose debut feature film Noemie Says Yes (Noémie dit oui) was released in 2022.

She previously directed a number of short films, including Paul Hébert, le rêveur acharné (2007), Reviens-tu ce soir? (2008), La vie heureuse de Gilles Z (2010), La traversée du salon (2011), Entre mon nom et ton film (2014), Pancakes & Kisses (2014) and Eroticfism (2015), and had a stage role in Cirque du Soleil's 2015 show Iris.

Noemie Says Yes was nominated for the John Dunning Best First Feature Award at the 11th Canadian Screen Awards in 2023.
