= Catherine Léger =

Canadian playwright and screenwriter

Catherine Léger (born 1980) is a Canadian playwright and screenwriter from Quebec.

A graduate of the National Theatre School of Canada, she won the Prix Gratien-Gélinas in 2006 for her theatrical play Voiture américaine. Her subsequent plays have included Opium_37 (2010), Princesses (2011), J'ai perdu mon mari (2015), Filles en liberté (2017) and Baby-sitter (2017).

She wrote for the television series Au secours de Béatrice, Marche à l'ombre and Les invisibles, and wrote the screenplays for the films The Little Queen (La petite reine) and Slut in a Good Way (Charlotte a du fun). She won the Canadian Screen Award for Best Original Screenplay at the 7th Canadian Screen Awards in 2019 for Slut in a Good Way.

She wrote the screenplays for Babysitter, Monia Chokri's 2022 film adaptation of Léger's theatrical play of the same name, and Two Women (Deux femmes en or), Chloé Robichaud's 2025 remake of Two Women in Gold.
