= Montreal International Documentary Festival =

Montreal International Documentary Festival Rencontres internationales du documentaire de Montreal
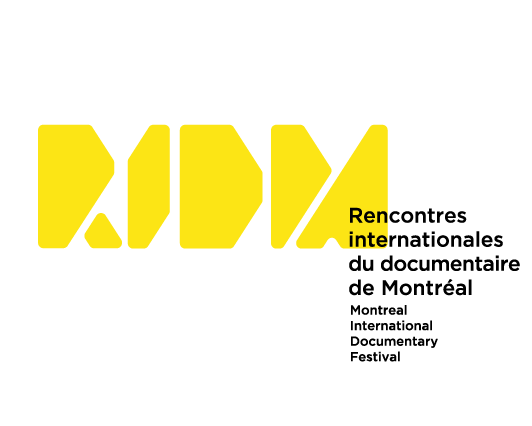
- Genre: Documentary film
- Locations: Montreal, Quebec
- Country: Canada
- Inaugurated: 1998
- Website: https://ridm.ca/en

The Montreal International Documentary Festival (French: Rencontres internationales du documentaire de Montreal) is a Canadian documentary film festival, staged annually in Montreal, Quebec.

In English, the festival now goes by the name Montreal International Documentary Festival, while retaining the French-language abbreviation RIDM.

== History ==
The RIDM was founded in 1998 by documentary filmmakers who wanted to create a platform for new perspectives and innovative practices in documentary film. The program, organized around social, political and environmental themes, features distinctive films chosen for their unique perspective and artistic strengths. Workshops and panel discussions welcome audiences, professionals and partners alike.

=== Forum RIDM ===
Formerly known as “Doc Circuit Montréal”, the RIDM is also home to "Forum RIDM", a documentary marketplace in Quebec established in 2004. It aims to support and stimulate independent documentary production in Quebec and to bring filmmakers, craftspeople, producers, distributors and programmers together.

== Award winners ==
=== 13th edition (2010) ===
Award	Documentary	Director	Country	Ref
Prix Caméra-Stylo	I Wish I Knew	Jia Zhang-Ke	China, Netherlands	
Prix Caméra au poing	108 Cuchillo de Palo	Renate Costa	Spain, Paraguay	
Prix Première Caméra	108 Cuchillo de Palo	Renate Costa	Spain, Paraguay	
Prix ÉcoCaméra	The Ailing Queen (La Reine malade)	Pascal Sanchez	Quebec/Canada	
Prix DocTape	Katka	Helena Třeštíková	Czech Republic	
Best Editing	Katka	Jakub Hejna	Czech Republic	
Best Cinematography (Prix Image)	The Woman with the Five Elephants	Niels Bolbrinker, Stéphane Kuthy	Switzerland, Germany	
Prix meilleur espoir Québec/Canada	The Heart that Beats (Ce cœur qui bat)	Philippe Lesage	Quebec/Canada	
Prix de la Cinémathèque québécoise	The Heart that Beats (Ce cœur qui bat)	Philippe Lesage	Quebec/Canada	
Prix du public	Chercher le courant	Nicolas Boisclair, Alexis de Gheldere	Quebec/Canada	

=== 14th edition (2011) ===
Award	Documentary	Director	Country	Ref
Grand Prize, International Feature	Lost Land (Territoire perdu)	Pierre-Yves Vandeweerd	Belgium	
Honorable Mention, International Feature	The Tiniest Place (El lugar más pequeño)	Tatiana Huezo	Mexico	
Grand Prize, National Feature	Notes on a Road Less Taken (Carnets d'un grand détour)	Catherine Hébert	Quebec/Canada	
Best New Talent From Quebec/Canada	The Vanishing Spring Light	Xun Yu	Quebec/Canada, China	
Best International Medium-Length Film	Hula and Natan	Robby Elmaliah	Israel	
Honorable Mention, International Medium-Length Film	Out of Reach (Poza zasiegiem)	Jakub Stozek	Poland	
Best International Short Film	Flying Anne (Anne Vliegt)	Catherine van Campen	Netherlands	
People's Choice Award	Bouton	Res Balzli	Switzerland	
Critic's Choice Award	United States of Africa (Les États-Unis d’Afrique)	Yanick Létourneau	Canada/Quebec	
Critic's Choice Award, Honorable Mention	Wiebo's War	David York	Canada	
Women Inmates' Jury	The Tiniest Place (El lugar más pequeño)	Tatiana Huezo	Mexico	
Best Editing in an International Feature	Lost Land (Territoire perdu)	Pierre-Yves Vandeweerd	Belgium	
Best Cinematography in an International Feature	The Night Watchman (El Velador)	Natalia Almada	Mexico	

=== 15th edition (2012) ===
Award	Documentary	Director	Country
Grand Prize, International Feature	Matthew's Laws	Marc Schmidt	Netherlands
Grand Prize, International Feature	Special mention: The Search for Emak Bakia	Oskar Alegria	Spain
Grand Prize, National Feature	My Real Life (Ma vie réelle)	Magnus Isacsson	Quebec/Canada
Grand Prize, National Feature	Special mention: The State of the World (L'État du monde)	Hubert Caron-Guay, Rodrigue Jean	Quebec/Canada
Best New Talent From Quebec/Canada	The Patron Saints	Melanie Shatzky, Brian M. Cassidy	Canada, United States
Best International Medium-Length Film	Argentinian Lessons	Wojciech Staroń	Poland
Best International Medium-Length Film	Special mention: Un été avec Anton	Jasna Krajinovic	Belgium
Best International Short Film	Dusty Night	Ali Hazara	France, Afghanistan
Best International Short Film	Special mention: River Rites	Ben Russell	United States, Suriname
People's Choice Award	5 Broken Cameras	Emad Burnat, Guy Davidi	Palestine, Israel, France
Magnus Isacsson Award	Herman's House	Angad Singh Bhalla	Canada
Magnus Isacsson Award	Special mention: Silence Is Gold (Le prix des mots)	Julien Fréchette	Quebec/Canada
Women Inmate Jury Award	5 Broken Cameras	Emad Burnat, Guy Davidi	Palestine, Israel, France
Women Inmate Jury Award	Special mention: Les poings de la fierté	Hélène Choquette	Quebec/Canada
Best Editing in an International Feature	Matthew's Laws	Marc Schmidt	Netherlands
Best Cinematography in an International Feature	Leviathan	Véréna Paravel, Lucien Castaing-Taylor	France, United Kingdom, United States

=== 16th edition (2013) ===
Award	Documentary	Director	Country
Grand Prize, International Feature	What Now? Remind Me (E agora? Lembra-me)	Joaquim Pinto	Portugal
Grand Prize, National Feature	Hoax Canular	Dominic Gagnon	Quebec/Canada
Grand Prize, National Feature	Special mention: Night Labor	Ashley Sabin, David Redmon	Canada, United States
Best New Talent From Quebec/Canada	Grandma (Bà nôi)	Khoa Lê	Quebec/Canada
Best International Medium-Length Film	A New Product	Harun Farocki	Germany
Best International Medium-Length Film	Special mention: The Art of Disappearing	Bartek Konopka, Piotr Rosolowski	Poland
Best International Short Film	Da Vinci	Yuri Ancarani	Italy
Best International Short Film	Special mention: A Story for the Modlins	Sergio Oksman	Spain
People's Choice Award	The Square	Jehane Noujaim	Egypt, United States
Magnus Isacsson Award	Québékoisie	Mélanie Carrier, Olivier Higgins	Quebec/Canada
Magnus Isacsson Award	Special mention: À jamais, pour toujours	Alexandra Sicotte-Levesque	Quebec/Canada
Women Inmate Jury Award	Expedition to the End of the World	Daniel Dencik	Denmark
Women Inmate Jury Award	Special mention: Salma	Kim Longinotto	India, United Kingdom
Best Editing in an International Feature	Let the Fire Burn	Jason Osder	United States
Best Cinematography in an International Feature	Tzvetanka	Youlian Tabakov	Bulgaria, Sweden

=== 17th edition (2014) ===
*Introduction of the "Student Jury Award"
Award	Documentary	Director	Country
Grand Prize, International Feature	Once Upon a Time	Kazim Öz	Turkey
Grand Prize, International Feature	Special mention: National Diploma (Examen d'état)	Dieudo Hamadi	Democratic Republic of the Congo, France
Grand Prize, National Feature	Sol	Marie-Hélène Cousineau, Susan Avingaq	Quebec/Canada
Grand Prize, National Feature	Special mention: Guidelines (La marche à suivre)	Jean-François Caissy	Quebec/Canada
Best New Talent From Quebec/Canada	Everything Will Be	Julia Kwan	Canada
Best New Talent From Quebec/Canada	Special mention: Juanicas	Karina Garcia Casanova	Quebec/Canada
Best International Medium-Length Film	Metaphor or Sadness Inside Out	Catarina Vasconcelos	Portugal, United Kingdom
Best International Short Film	Atlantis	Ben Russell	Malta, United States
People's Choice Award	Citizenfour	Laura Poitras	Germany, United States
Magnus Isacsson Award	The Secret Trial 5	Amar Wala	Canada
Magnus Isacsson Award	Special mention: From Prisons to Prisons (De prisons en prisons)	Steve Patry	Quebec/Canada
Student Jury Award	L’œuvre des jours	Bruno Baillargeon	Quebec/Canada
Student Jury Award	Special mention: Juanicas	Karina Garcia Casanova	Quebec/Canada
Women Inmate Jury Award	National Diploma (Examen d'état)	Dieudo Hamadi	Democratic Republic of the Congo, France
Best Editing in an International Feature	Letters to Max	Éric Baudelaire	France
Best Cinematography in an International Feature	Les Tourmentes	Pierre-Yves Vandeweerd	Belgium, France

=== 18th edition (2015) ===
Award	Documentary	Director	Country
Grand Prize, International Feature	Homeland (Iraq Year Zero)	Abbas Fahdel	France, Iraq
Grand Prize, International Feature	Special mention: Snakeskin	Daniel Hui	Portugal, Singapore
Grand Prize, National Feature	A Summer Love (Un amour d'été)	Jean-François Lesage	Quebec/Canada
Grand Prize, National Feature	Special mention: Pinocchio	André-Line Beauparlant	Quebec/Canada
Best New Talent From Quebec/Canada	Welcome to F.L. (Bienvenue à F.L.)	Geneviève Dulude-De Celles	Quebec/Canada
Best International Medium-Length Film	Field Niggas	Khalik Allah	United States
Best International Medium-Length Film	Special mention: Business Club	Chloé Mahieu, Lila Pinell	France
Best International Short Film	Among Us	Guido Hendrikx	Netherlands
Best International Short Film	Special mention: Elle pis son char	Loïc Darses	Quebec/Canada
People's Choice Award	Homeland (Iraq Year Zero)	Abbas Fahdel	France, Iraq
Magnus Isacsson Award	Retour aux sources	Jean-Sébastien Francoeur, Andrew Marchand-Boddy	Quebec/Canada, Cambodia
Magnus Isacsson Award	Special mention: Manor (Manoir)	Martin Fournier, Pier-Luc Latulippe	Quebec/Canada
Student Jury Award	P.S. Jerusalem	Danae Elon	Canada
Women Inmate Jury Award	Retour aux sources	Jean-Sébastien Francoeur, Andrew Marchand-Boddy	Quebec/Canada, Cambodia
Best Editing in an International Feature	Je suis le peuple	Saskia Berthod, Chantal Piquet (director Anna Roussillon)	France
Best Cinematography in an International Feature	The Other Side	Diego Romero Suarez-Llanos (director Roberto Minervini)	France, Italy

=== 19th edition (2016) ===
*"Best International Medium-Length Film" and "Best International Short Film" awards become "Best International Short or Medium-Length Film" and "Best National Short or Medium-Length Film"
Award	Documentary	Director	Country
Grand Prize, International Feature	Another Year	Shengze Zhu	China
Grand Prize, International Feature	Special mention: Tempestad	Tatiana Huezo	Mexico
Grand Prize, National Feature	Resurrecting Hassan (La résurrection d’Hassan)	Carlo Guillermo Proto	Quebec/Canada
Grand Prize, National Feature	Special mention: Tales of Two Who Dreamt	Andrea Bussmann, Nicolás Pereda	Canada, Mexico
Best New Talent From Quebec/Canada	Gulîstan, Land of Roses (Gulîstan, terre de roses)	Zaynê Akyol	Canada, Germany
Best International Short or Medium-Length Film	Isabella Morra	Isabel Pagliai	France
Best International Short or Medium-Length Film	Special mention: Long Story Short	Natalie Bookchin	United States
Best International Short or Medium-Length Film	Special mention: He Who Eats Children	Ben Russell	United States
Best National Short or Medium-Length Film	The Botanist	Maude Plante-Husaruk, Maxime Lacoste-Lebuis	Quebec/Canada, Tajikistan
People's Choice Award	Le goût d’un pays	Francis Legault	Quebec/Canada
Magnus Isacsson Award	Angry Inuk	Alethea Arnaquq-Baril	Quebec/Canada
Magnus Isacsson Award	Special mention: The Stairs	Hugh Gibson	Canada
Student Jury Award	Resurrecting Hassan (La résurrection d’Hassan)	Carlo Guillermo Proto	Quebec/Canada
Student Jury Award	Special mention: The Stairs	Hugh Gibson	Canada
Women Inmate Jury Award	Angry Inuk	Alethea Arnaquq-Baril	Quebec/Canada
Women Inmate Jury Award	Special mention: Mr. Gaga	Tomer Heymann	Israel, Sweden, Germany, Netherlands
Best Editing in an International Feature	Havarie	Philip Scheffner	Germany
Best Cinematography in an International Feature	Brothers of the Night	Patric Chiha	Norway

=== 20th edition (2017) ===
*"Best Editing" and "Best Cinematography" awards are removed to introduce "Special Jury Prize" for International and National Feature.
Award	Documentary	Director	Country
Grand Prize, International Feature	Room for a Man	Anthony Chidiac	Lebanon, United States
Special Jury Prize, International Feature	Taste of Cement	Ziad Kalthoum	Germany, Lebanon, Syria, United Arab Emirates
Grand Prize, National Feature	Taming the Horse	Tao Gu	Quebec/Canada, China
Grand Prize, National Feature	Special mention: Primas	Laura Bari	Quebec/Canada, Argentina
Special Jury Prize, National Feature	The Hidden River (La rivière cachée)	Jean-François Lesage	Quebec/Canada
Best New Talent From Quebec/Canada	The Other Rio (L'Autre Rio)	Emilie B. Guérette	Quebec/Canada
Best International Short or Medium-Length Film	Nyo Vweta Nafta	Ico Costa	Portugal
Best National Short or Medium-Length Film	In the Waves	Jacquelyn Mills	Quebec/Canada
People's Choice Award	Ouvrir la voix	Amandine Gay	France
Magnus Isacsson Award	State of Exception	Jason O’Hara	Brazil, Canada
Student Jury Award	Birth of a Family	Tasha Hubbard	Canada
Women Inmate Jury Award	Baggage (Bagages)	Paul Tom	Quebec/Canada

=== 21st edition (2018) ===
Award	Documentary	Director	Country
Grand Prize, International Feature	Hale County This Morning, This Evening	RaMell Ross	United States
Special Jury Prize, International Feature	Extinction (Extinção)	Salomé Lamas	Portugal, Germany
Grand Prize, National Feature	Dark Suns (Soleils noirs)	Julien Élie	Quebec/Canada
Special Jury Prize, National Feature	Symphony in Aquamarine	Dan Popa	Quebec/Canada
Best New Talent From Quebec/Canada	Symphony in Aquamarine	Dan Popa	Quebec/Canada
Best International Short or Medium-Length Film	The Disappearance of Goya	Toni Geitani	Lebanon
Best International Short or Medium-Length Film	Special mention: Gulyabani	Gürcan Keltek	Netherlands, Turkey
Best National Short or Medium-Length Film	Zagros	Ariane Lorrain, Shahab Mihandoust	Quebec/Canada
People's Choice Award	Memory is Our Homeland	Jonathan Durand	Quebec/Canada, Portugal
Magnus Isacsson Award	Avec un sourire, la révolution	Alexandre Chartrand	Quebec/Canada
Student Jury Award	20-22 OMEGA	Thierry Loa	Quebec/Canada
Women Inmate Jury Award	Point d’équilibre	Christine Chevarie-Lessard	Quebec/Canada

=== 22nd edition (2019) ===
*"Best New Talent From Quebec/Canada" becomes "New Vision Award"
Award	Documentary	Director	Country
Grand Prize, International Feature	Present.Perfect.	Shengze Zhu	United States, Hong Kong
Special Jury Prize, International Feature	Heimat Is a Space in Time	Thomas Heise	Germany, Austria
Special Jury Prize, International Feature	Special mention: 143 rue du désert	Hassen Ferhani	Algeria, France, Qatar
Grand Prize, National Feature	A Woman, My Mother (Une femme, ma mère)	Claude Demers	Quebec/Canada
Special Jury Prize, National Feature	Wilcox	Denis Côté	Quebec/Canada
New Vision Award	Don't Worry, the Doors Will Open	Oksana Karpovych	Quebec/Canada, Ukraine
Best International Short or Medium-Length Film	Faire-part	Rob Jacobs, Anne Reijniers, Nizar Saleh, Paul Shemisi	Belgium, Democratic Republic of the Congo
Best National Short or Medium-Length Film	Homeport (Port d'attache)	Laurence Lévesque	Quebec/Canada
People's Choice Award	Kenbe la, Until We Win (Kenbe la, jusqu’à la victoire)	Will Prosper	Quebec/Canada
Magnus Isacsson Award	Nîpawistamâsowin: We Will Stand Up	Tasha Hubbard	Canada
Student Jury Award	Nîpawistamâsowin: We Will Stand Up	Tasha Hubbard	Canada
Women Inmate Jury Award	Nîpawistamâsowin: We Will Stand Up	Tasha Hubbard	Canada

=== 23rd edition (2020) ===
*"Student Jury Award" and "Women Inmate Jury Award" not awarded due to COVID-19
Award	Documentary	Director	Country
Grand Prize, International Feature	Aswang	Alyx Ayn Arumpac	Philippines, Denmark, France, Germany
Special Jury Prize, International Feature	IWOW: I Walk on Water	Khalik Allah	United States
Grand Prize, National Feature	Inconvenient Indian	Michelle Latimer	Canada
Grand Prize, National Feature	Special mention: The Forbidden Reel	Ariel Nasr	Quebec/Canada
Special Jury Prize, National Feature	Prayer for a Lost Mitten (Prière pour une mitaine perdue)	Jean-François Lesage	Quebec/Canada
New Vision Award	No Ordinary Man	Aisling Chin-Yee, Chase Joynt	Quebec/Canada
Best International Short or Medium-Length Film	Clean With Me (After Dark)	Gabrielle Stemmer	France
Best National Short or Medium-Length Film	Goodnight Goodnight	Mackenzie Reid Rostad	Quebec/Canada
People's Choice Award	Little Girl (Petite fille)	Sébastien Lifshitz	France
Magnus Isacsson Award	Inconvenient Indian	Michelle Latimer	Canada
Magnus Isacsson Award	Special mention: No Ordinary Man	Aisling Chin-Yee, Chase Joynt	Quebec/Canada

=== 24th edition (2021) ===
*"Women Inmate Jury Award" not awarded due to COVID-19
Award	Documentary	Director	Country
Grand Prize, International Feature	Looking for Horses	Stefan Pavlovic	Netherlands, Bosnia and Herzegovina, France
Special Jury Prize, International Feature	A Night of Knowing Nothing	Payal Kapadia	France, India
Grand Prize, National Feature	Zo Reken	Emanuel Licha	Quebec/Canada
Special Jury Prize, National Feature	Animal Macula	Sylvain L'Espérance	Quebec/Canada
Special Jury Prize, National Feature	Special mention: Dropstones	Caitlin Durlak	Canada
New Vision Award	Far Beyond the Pasturelands (Au-delà des hautes vallées)	Maude Plante-Husaruk, Maxime Lacoste-Lebuis	Quebec/Canada
Best International Short or Medium-Length Film	If You See Her, Say Hello	Hee Young Pyun et Jiajun (Oscar) Zhang	China
Best International Short or Medium-Length Film	Special mention: All of Your Stars are but Dust on my Shoes	Haig Aivazian	Lebanon
Best National Short or Medium-Length Film	The Truss Arch	Sonya Stefan	Canada
People's Choice Award	Dear Audrey	Jeremiah Hayes	Quebec/Canada
Magnus Isacsson Award	Dear Jackie	Henri Pardo	Quebec/Canada
Magnus Isacsson Award	Special mention: Zo Reken	Emanuel Licha	Quebec/Canada
Student Jury Award	Zo Reken	Emanuel Licha	Quebec/Canada

=== 25th edition (2022) ===
*Introduction of the "Special Jury Prize, National Short or Medium-Length Film"
Award	Documentary	Director	Country
Grand Prize, International Feature	One Take Grace	Lindiwe Matshikiza	South Africa
Grand Prize, International Feature	Special mention: Anhell69	Theo Montoya	Colombia, Romania, France, Germany
Special Jury Prize, International Feature	Dry Ground Burning	Adirley Queirós, Joana Pimenta	Portugal, Brazil
Grand Prize, National Feature	The Dependents	Sofía Brockenshire	Canada, Argentina
Special Jury Prize, National Feature	Self-Portrait	Joële Walinga	Canada
New Vision Award	Veranada	Dominique Chaumont	Canada
Best International Short or Medium-Length Film	Fuku Nashi	Julie Sando	Switzerland, Japan
Best International Short or Medium-Length Film	Special mention: No Star	Tana Gilbert Fernández	Chile
Best National Short or Medium-Length Film	Landscape Suspended	Naghmeh Abbasi	Canada, Iran
Best National Short or Medium-Length Film	Special mention: Mecánicos piratas de Lima	Carlos Ferrand	Canada, Peru
Special Jury Prize, National Short or Medium-Length Film	Infinite Distances	Pablo Alvarez Mesa	Quebec/Canada
People's Choice Award	Big Fight in Little Chinatown	Karen Cho	Canada
Magnus Isacsson Award	The Myth of the Black Woman	Ayana O'Shun	Quebec/Canada
Magnus Isacsson Award	Special mention: Wochiigii lo: End of the Peace	Heather Hatch	Canada
Student Jury Award	Geographies of Solitude	Jacquelyn Mills	Canada
Women Inmate Jury Award	Big Fight in Little Chinatown	Karen Cho	Canada

=== 26th edition (2023) ===
Award	Documentary	Director	Country
Grand Prize, International Feature	Knit's Island	Guilhem Causse, Ekiem Barbier, Quentin L'Helgoualc'h	France
Special Jury Prize, International Feature	Crowrã	João Salaviza, Renée Nader Messora	Brazil, Portugal
Special Jury Prize, International Feature	Special mention: This Woman	Alan Zhang	China, Malaysia
Grand Prize, National Feature	While the Green Grass Grows	Peter Mettler	Canada
Special Jury Prize, National Feature	Mother Saigon (Má Sài Gòn)	Khoa Lê	Quebec/Canada
New Visions Award	Meezan	Shahab Mihandoust	Quebec/Canada, Iran
Best International Short or Medium-Length Film	Ever Since, I Have Been Flying	Aylin Gökmen	Switzerland
Best International Short or Medium-Length Film	Special mention: Aqueronte	Manuel Muñoz Rivas	Spain
Best National Short or Medium-Length Film	Jill, Uncredited	Anthony Ing	Canada, United Kingdom
Special Jury Prize, National Short or Medium-Length Film	Holiday Native Land	Nicolas Renaud, Brian Virostek	Quebec/Canada
People's Choice Award	Eviction (Éviction)	Mathilde Capone	Quebec/Canada
Magnus Isacsson Award	The White Guard	Julien Élie	Quebec/Canada
Student Jury Award	The White Guard	Julien Élie	Quebec/Canada
Women Inmate Jury Award	Mother Saigon (Má Sài Gòn)	Khoa Lê	Quebec/Canada
Radio-Canada Emerging Talent Award	Where Motion Has Not Yet Ceased	Juliette Balthazard	Canada, Czech Republic

=== 27th edition (2024) ===
Award	Documentary	Director	Country
Grand Prize, International Feature	Republic	Jiang Jin	Singapore, China
Special Jury Prize, International Feature	To Our Friends	Adrián Orr	Spain, Portugal
Grand Prize, National Feature	Intercepted	Oksana Karpovych	Canada, France, Ukraine
Special Jury Prize, National Feature	Archeology of Light (Archéologie de la lumière)	Sylvain L’Espérance	Canada
New Visions Award	The Undergrowth	Macu Machín	Spain
New Visions Award	Up the River with Acid	Harald Hutter	Canada
Best International Short or Medium-Length Film	Razeh-del	Maryam Tafakory	Iran, Italy, United Kingdom
Best International Short or Medium-Length Film	Honorable mention: Break no. 1 & Break no.2	Lei Lei	China
Best National Short or Medium-Length Film	A Stone's Throw	Razan AlSalah	Canada, Lebanon, Palestine
Special Jury Prize, National Short or Medium-Length Film	Sous le soleil exactement	Noa Blanche Beschorner	Canada, Germany
Special Jury Prize, National Short or Medium-Length Film	Archipelago of Earthen Bones — To Bunya	Malena Szlam	Canada, Chile, Australia
People's Choice Award	No Other Land	Basel Adra, Hamdan Ballal, Yuval Abraham, Rachel Szor	Palestine, Norway
Magnus Isacsson Award	Ninan Auassat: We, the Children	Kim O'Bomsawin	Canada
Magnus Isacsson Award	Honorable mention: At All Kosts (Koutkékout)	Joseph Hillel	Canada, Haiti
Student Jury Award	Billy	Lawrence Côté-Collins	Canada
Women Inmate Jury Award	Wilfred Buck	Lisa Jackson	Canada
Radio-Canada Emerging Talent Award	Emboiter leurs pas	Manuel Orhy Pirón	Canada

=== 28th edition (2025) ===
Award	Documentary	Director	Country
Grand Prize, International Feature	Imago	Déni Oumar Pitsaev	France, Belgium
Special Jury Prize, International Feature	Waking Hours	Federico Cammarata, Filippo Foscarini	Italy
Special Jury Prize, International Feature	Special Mention: Evidence	Lee Ann Schmitt	United States
Grand Prize, National Feature	Partition	Diana Allan	Palestine, Lebanon, Canada
Special Jury Prize, National Feature	Kindergarten (Jardin d'enfants)	Jean-François Caissy	Canada
New Visions Award	Soul of the Foot	Mustafa Uzuner	Canada, Turkey
Best International Short or Medium-Length Film	Marratein, Marratein	Julia Yezbick	United States, Lebanon
Best National Short or Medium-Length Film	Lloyd Wong, Unfinished	Lesley Loksi Chan	Canada
Special Jury Prize, National Short or Medium-Length Film	Momentum	Nada El-Omari	Canada
People's Choice Award	A Thousand Colours (Recomposée)	Nadia Louis-Desmarchais	Canada
Magnus Isacsson Award	Spare My Bones, Coyote!	Jonah Malak	Canada
Magnus Isacsson Award	Special mention: A Thousand Colours (Recomposée)	Nadia Louis-Desmarchais	Canada
Student Jury Award	A Thousand Colours (Recomposée)	Nadia Louis-Desmarchais	Canada
Women Inmate Jury Award	The Blueberry Blues (Les blues du bleuet)	Andrés Livov	Canada
Women Inmate Jury Award	Spare My Bones, Coyote!	Jonah Malak	Canada
Radio-Canada Emerging Talent Award	Histoires d'anxiétés	Adèle Schneider	Canada
