= Canadian Screen Award for Best Cinematography in a Documentary =

Annual Canadian film award

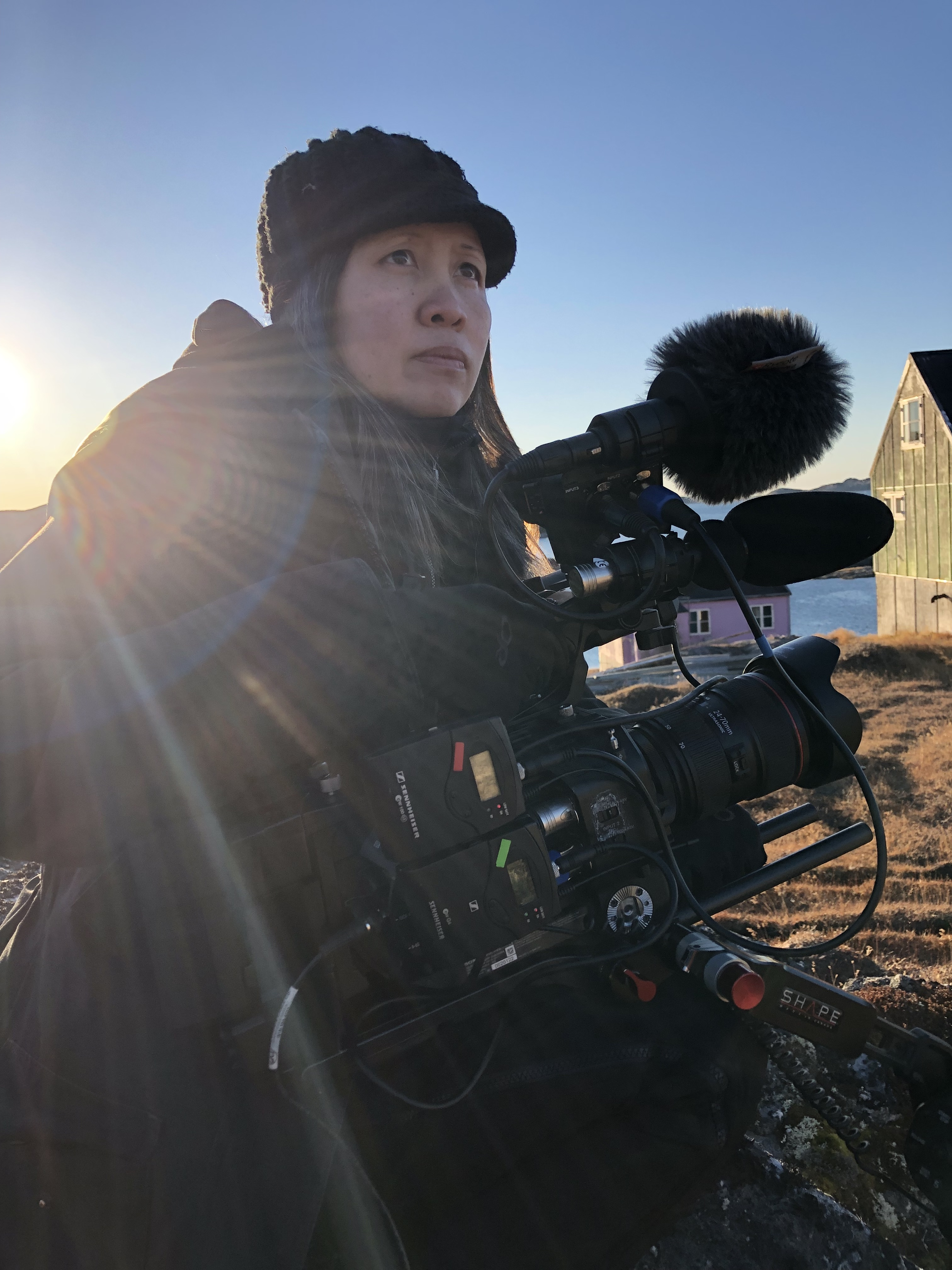
- 2025 winner: Iris Ng
- Country: Canada
- Presented by: Academy of Canadian Cinema & Television
- First award: 1980
- Currently held by: Iris Ng for There Are No Words (2025)
- Website: academy.ca/awards

The Canadian Screen Award for Best Cinematography in a Documentary is an annual award, presented as part of the Canadian Screen Awards program to honour the year's best cinematography in a documentary film. It is presented separately from the Canadian Screen Award for Best Cinematography for feature films.

On two prior occasions, at the 1st Genie Awards in 1980 and at the short-lived Bijou Awards in 1981, awards were presented for Best Cinematography in a Documentary (Non-Feature), covering short documentaries and television programs, but not for feature documentaries. Nonetheless, the winners and nominees in those years have been included below. In the 1960s, both short and feature documentary films were sometimes winners of the Canadian Film Award for Best Cinematography, as relatively few Canadian narrative features were made in that era, but this was not continued after 1969.

== 1980s ==
Year	Nominees	Film	Ref
1980; 1st Genie Awards (Non-Feature)
1980; 1st Genie Awards (Non-Feature)	Roger Rochat	Ice Birds (Le Pilier de cristal)	
1980; 1st Genie Awards (Non-Feature)	Ron Orieux	Nails	
1980; 1st Genie Awards (Non-Feature)	Barry Perles, Douglas Kiefer	Paperland: The Bureaucrat Observed	
1980; 1st Genie Awards (Non-Feature)	Charles Stewart	Dieppe 1942	
1981; Bijou Awards (Non-Feature)
1981; Bijou Awards (Non-Feature)	Robert Fresco	Steady as She Goes	

== 2010s ==
Year	Nominees	Film	Ref
2014; 3rd Canadian Screen Awards
2014; 3rd Canadian Screen Awards	Patrick McLaughlin	Everything Will Be	
2014; 3rd Canadian Screen Awards	Geoffroy Beauchemin, Alex Margineanu, Sami Mermer, Francois Vincelette	The Sower (Le semeur)	
2014; 3rd Canadian Screen Awards	Nicolas Canniccioni, Jean-Pierre St-Louis	Where I'm From (D’ou je viens)	
2014; 3rd Canadian Screen Awards	Nicolas Canniccioni	Guidelines (La marche à suivre)	
2014; 3rd Canadian Screen Awards	Marie Davignon, Jessica Lee Gagné, Geneviève Perron	All That We Make (Fermières)	
2015; 4th Canadian Screen Awards
2015; 4th Canadian Screen Awards	Arnaud Bouquet	Last of the Elephant Men	
2015; 4th Canadian Screen Awards	Thomas Burstyn	Some Kind of Love	
2015; 4th Canadian Screen Awards	Daniel Grant, Amar Arhab	The Messenger	
2015; 4th Canadian Screen Awards	Léna Mill-Reuillard, Étienne Roussy	Welcome to F.L. (Bienvenue à F.L.)	
2015; 4th Canadian Screen Awards	Simon Schneider, Sasha Snow	Hadwin's Judgement	
2016; 5th Canadian Screen Awards
2016; 5th Canadian Screen Awards	John Price	I Am the Blues	
2016; 5th Canadian Screen Awards	Joan Poggio	Gun Runners	
2016; 5th Canadian Screen Awards	Derek Rogers	The Skyjacker's Tale	
2016; 5th Canadian Screen Awards	Chris Romeike	Giants of Africa	
2016; 5th Canadian Screen Awards	Van Royko	Koneline: Our Land Beautiful	
2017; 6th Canadian Screen Awards
2017; 6th Canadian Screen Awards	Alfonso Maiorana	Rumble: The Indians Who Rocked the World	
2017; 6th Canadian Screen Awards	Mike McLaughlin	Unarmed Verses	
2017; 6th Canadian Screen Awards	Duraid Munajim	My Enemy, My Brother	
2017; 6th Canadian Screen Awards	Carlo Guillermo Proto	Resurrecting Hassan	
2017; 6th Canadian Screen Awards	Vuk Stojanovic, François Jacob, Ilya Zima	A Moon of Nickel and Ice (Sur la lune de nickel)	
2018; 7th Canadian Screen Awards
2018; 7th Canadian Screen Awards	Nicholas de Pencier	Anthropocene: The Human Epoch	
2018; 7th Canadian Screen Awards	Nicolas Canniccioni	First Stripes (Premières armes)	
2018; 7th Canadian Screen Awards	Christy Garland	What Walaa Wants	
2018; 7th Canadian Screen Awards	Étienne Roussy	The Other Rio (L'autre Rio)	
2018; 7th Canadian Screen Awards	Matthieu Rytz	Anote's Ark	
2019; 8th Canadian Screen Awards
2019; 8th Canadian Screen Awards	Pedro Ruiz	Havana, from on High	
2019; 8th Canadian Screen Awards	Mathieu Arsenault	Head First (Tenir tête)	
2019; 8th Canadian Screen Awards	Grant Baldwin	This Mountain Life	
2019; 8th Canadian Screen Awards	Léna Mill-Reuillard, Stéphanie Weber Biron, Étienne Boilard	City Dreamers	
2019; 8th Canadian Screen Awards	Pedro Pires	Alexander Odyssey (Alexandre le fou)	

== 2020s ==
Year	Nominees	Film	Ref
2020; 9th Canadian Screen Awards
2020; 9th Canadian Screen Awards	Ryan Randall	Workhorse	
2020; 9th Canadian Screen Awards	Jean-Philippe Archibald	The Free Ones (Les libres)	
2020; 9th Canadian Screen Awards	Glauco Bermudez, Mark Ó Fearghaíl	Influence	
2020; 9th Canadian Screen Awards	Renaud Philippe, Olivier Higgins	Wandering: A Rohingya Story (Errance sans retour)	
2020; 9th Canadian Screen Awards	Kiarash Sadigh	Nahanni: River of Forgiveness	
2021; 10th Canadian Screen Awards
2021; 10th Canadian Screen Awards	Marianne Ploska	Prayer for a Lost Mitten (Prière pour une mitaine perdue)	
2021; 10th Canadian Screen Awards	Vince Arvidson	The Magnitude of All Things	
2021; 10th Canadian Screen Awards	Nicholas Castel, Gabriel Swift, Bronson Whytcross, John Fulton	Coextinction	
2021; 10th Canadian Screen Awards	Rita Leistner	Forest for the Trees	
2021; 10th Canadian Screen Awards	Patrick McLaughlin	Kímmapiiyipitssini: The Meaning of Empathy	
2022; 11th Canadian Screen Awards
2022; 11th Canadian Screen Awards	Nicholas de Pencier	The Colour of Ink	
2022; 11th Canadian Screen Awards	Noura Kevorkian	Batata	
2022; 11th Canadian Screen Awards	Katerine Giguère	Scrap	
2022; 11th Canadian Screen Awards	Jacquelyn Mills	Geographies of Solitude	
2022; 11th Canadian Screen Awards	Étienne Roussy	Zo Reken	
2023; 12th Canadian Screen Awards
2023; 12th Canadian Screen Awards	Kaveh Nabatian	Kite Zo A: Leave the Bones	
2023; 12th Canadian Screen Awards	Ben Giesbrecht, Luke Connor	Aitamaako'tamisskapi Natosi: Before the Sun	
2023; 12th Canadian Screen Awards	Patrick McGowan, Jason Providence	Coven	
2023; 12th Canadian Screen Awards	Ernesto Pardo	The White Guard (La Garde blanche)	
2023; 12th Canadian Screen Awards	Étienne Roussy	Beyond Paper (Au-delà du papier)	
2024; 13th Canadian Screen Awards
2024; 13th Canadian Screen Awards	Michael Toledano	Yintah	
2024; 13th Canadian Screen Awards	Sébastien Blais	Okurimono	
2024; 13th Canadian Screen Awards	Ashley Iris Gill	Disco's Revenge	
2024; 13th Canadian Screen Awards	Christopher Nunn	Intercepted	
2024; 13th Canadian Screen Awards	Olivier Tétreault, Claude Demers, François Messier-Rheault	Diary of a Father (Journal d'un père)	
2025; 14th Canadian Screen Awards
2025; 14th Canadian Screen Awards	Iris Ng	There Are No Words	
2025; 14th Canadian Screen Awards	Glauco Bermudez, François Messier-Rheault	Shifting Baselines	
2025; 14th Canadian Screen Awards	Marcel Mueller	Circo	
2025; 14th Canadian Screen Awards	Étienne Roussy	Among Mountains and Streams (Parmi les montagnes et les ruisseaux)	
2025; 14th Canadian Screen Awards	Kyle Sandilands	Everest Dark	

== See also ==
- Prix Iris for Best Cinematography in a Documentary
