= All That We Make =

- Film poster
- French: Fermières
- Directed by: Annie St-Pierre
- Produced by: Luc Déry; Élaine Hébert; Kim McCraw
- Cinematography: Marie Davignon; Jessica Lee Gagné; Geneviève Perron
- Edited by: Myriam Magassouba
- Music by: Philippe Brault
- Release date: November 24, 2013 (RIDM)
- Running time: 83 minutes
- Country: Canada
- Language: French

All That We Make (French: Fermières) is a Canadian documentary film, directed by Annie St-Pierre and released in 2013. The film profiles four women associated with the Cercles de fermières du Québec, a provincewide network of local organizations for women involved in farming.

The film premiered as the closing gala at the 2013 Rencontres internationales du documentaire de Montréal.

The film received three Canadian Screen Award nominations, for Best Feature Length Documentary, Best Cinematography in a Documentary (Marie Davignon, Jessica Lee Gagné, Geneviève Perron) and Best Editing in a Documentary (Myriam Magassouba), at the 3rd Canadian Screen Awards in 2015.
