= Workhorse (film) =

2019 film by Cliff Caines

- Directed by: Cliff Caines
- Written by: Cliff Caines
- Produced by: Cliff Caines
- Cinematography: Ryan Randall
- Edited by: Cliff Caines; Roland Schlimme
- Music by: Tom Third
- Production company: Headframe Films
- Release date: November 17, 2019 (RIDM)
- Running time: 82 minutes
- Country: Canada
- Language: English

Workhorse is a Canadian documentary film, directed by Cliff Caines and released in 2019. A meditation on the relationship between humans and animals, the film profiles a logger and a farmer who still to this day use old-fashioned workhorses rather than contemporary mechanical equipment in their jobs, as well as a family who raise and train horses to participate in workhorse competitions at agricultural fairs.

The film premiered on November 17, 2019 at the Montreal International Documentary Festival.

Ryan Randall won the Canadian Screen Award for Best Cinematography in a Documentary at the 9th Canadian Screen Awards in 2021, and was a nominee for the Canadian Society of Cinematographers' Robert Brooks Award for Documentary Cinematography.
