= Shengze Zhu =

Chinese filmmaker

- 朱声仄
- Born: 1987 (age 38–39); Wuhan, China
- Occupations: Film director, producer
- Years active: 2010–present
- Awards: Visions du Réel; Sesterce d’or Best Film Award Montreal International Documentary Festival Grand Prize; Critics Award Olhar de Cinema Festival; Tiger Award International Film Festival Rotterdam

Shengze Zhu (Chinese: 朱声仄; pinyin: Zhū Shēngzè; born 1987) is a Chinese producer and documentary filmmaker. She co-founded the production company Burn the Film with director Yang Zhengfang and is best known for her documentation of contemporary Chinese life through film.

== Early life ==
Zhu was born and raised in the Hubei province of China. She moved to America in 2010 to pursue a photojournalism degree at the University of Missouri in Columbia. It was during this time that Zhu got into the field of creative documentaries. She has lived in Chicago since 2015.

== Career ==
Since 2010, Zhu has been collaborating with fellow Chinese producer, visual artist, writer, and director Zhengfan Yang. They co-founded the production company Burn the Film, which focuses on creating and supporting moving-image works with “singular voices”. Zhu has also worked as the producer for many of Yang’s films, such as Distant (2013), Where Are You Going (2016) and Down There (2018).

== Works ==
Zhu’s work centers around contemporary Chinese society, and gives a unique insight into the lives of those living in central China’s most populous city, Wuhan. Her first film and directorial debut, Out of Focus, premiered in 2014 at the Cinema du Réel in France and focused on Zhu’s experience teaching photography to migrant children aged 8 to 12 in Wuhan.

Zhu’s second film, Another Year, premiered in 2016 and consists of 13 long takes, following the story of a migrant family in Wuhan over the course of a year. It received the Sesterce d’or Best film Award at its premiere at the Visions du Réel in Switzerland, as well as the Grand Prize at the RIDM Montreal International documentary festival, the Critics Award at the Olhar de Cinema festival in Brazil, and was nominated as one of the Top 10 Films of the Year in 2016 by 24 Images magazine.

Her third and most acclaimed documentary, Present.Perfect, premiered in 2019. It is an experimental documentary which stitches together a story about Chinese society from over 800 hours of livestream footage that Zhu sorted through. Zhu followed and recorded the content of these live streamer's over the course of ten months, watching everyone from a cattle farm worker to a chain smoking burn victim. It premiered at the International Film Festival Rotterdam, where it received the honourable Tiger Award for the best film.

Zhu's most recent film, titled A River Runs, Turns, Erases, Replaces was released in 2021 and documents the life and changes that take place in Wuhan along the Yangtze River. She started working on the documentary in 2016, six years after having left Wuhan, when she started to feel alienated and estranged from the city due to its rapidly growing construction projects.

Filmography
Year	Title	Role
2014	Out of Focus	Director
2016	Another Year	Director
2019	Present.Perfect	Director
2021	A River Runs, Turns, Erases, Replaces	Director
