= Étienne Roussy =

Canadian cinematographer

Étienne Roussy is a Canadian cinematographer. He is most noted for his work on the film Gulîstan, Land of Roses (Gulîstan, terre de roses), for which he won the Prix Iris for Best Cinematography in a Documentary at the 19th Quebec Cinema Awards in 2017.

He has also been a three-time Canadian Screen Award nominee for Best Cinematography in a Documentary.

He is an alumnus of the Université du Québec à Montréal.

== Filmography ==
- Oh, Be a Fine Girl, Kiss Me - 2010
- Maudits maux dits - 2010
- L'État du monde - 2012
- The Sunday Robbers (Les Voleurs du dimanche) - 2012
- Rives - 2013
- Love in the Time of Civil War (L'amour au temps de la guerre civile) - 2014
- Welcome to F.L. (Bienvenue à F.L.) - 2015
- Gulîstan, Land of Roses (Gulîstan, terre de roses) - 2016
- The Taste of Vietnam - 2016
- The Other Rio (L'Autre Rio) - 2017
- Destierros - 2018
- A Colony (Une colonie) - 2018
- The Ideal Exhibition with Hervé Tullet - 2018
- Rouge Gorge - 2019
- The Prince of Val-Bé (Le Prince de Val-Bé) - 2019
- Train Hopper - 2019
- Jarvik - 2019
- Prisons Without Bars (Prisons sans barreaux) - 2020
- Like the Ones I Used to Know (Les Grandes claques) - 2021
- The Gig Is Up - 2021
- Zo Reken - 2021
- Happy Life (La Vie heureuse) - 2021
- Lou et Sophie - 2021-22 (TV series)
- Waiting for Raif (En attendant Raif) - 2022
- Beyond Paper (Au-delà du papier) - 2023
- Among Mountains and Streams (Parmi les montagnes et les ruisseaux) - 2025
- The Punk of Natashquan (Le Punk de Natashquan) - 2025
- The Mechanics of Borders (La Mécanique des frontières) - 2025
- A Fire There (Un feu au loin) - 2026

== Awards ==
Award	Year	Category	Work	Result	Ref(s)
Canadian Screen Awards	2016	Best Cinematography in a Documentary	Welcome to F.L. (Bienvenue à F.L.) (with Léna Mill-Reuillard)	Nominated	
Canadian Screen Awards	2019	Best Cinematography in a Documentary	The Other Rio (L'Autre Rio)	Nominated	
Canadian Screen Awards	2023	Best Cinematography in a Documentary	Zo Reken	Nominated	
Quebec Cinema Awards	2017	Best Cinematography in a Documentary	Gulîstan, Land of Roses (Gulîstan, terre de roses)	Won	
Quebec Cinema Awards	2018	Best Cinematography in a Documentary	Destierros	Nominated	
Quebec Cinema Awards	2025	Best Cinematography in a Documentary	Among Mountains and Streams (Parmi les montagnes et les ruisseaux)	Won	
