= Ravida Din =

Canadian film producer

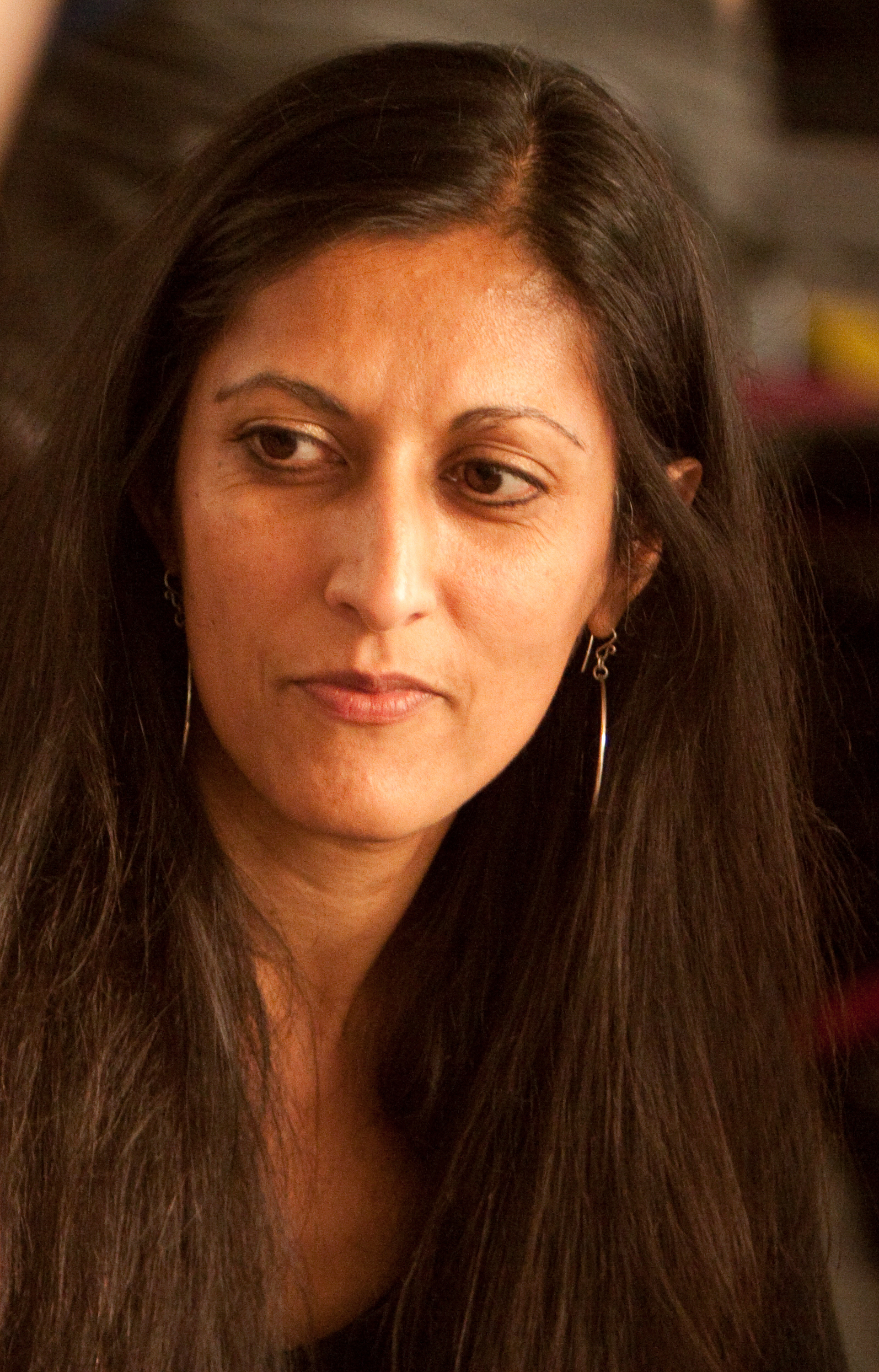
- Din in 2010
- Born: Nairobi, Kenya
- Occupation: Film Producer

Ravida Din is a Canadian film producer who formerly served with the National Film Board of Canada (NFB) as a producer, executive producer, then as its Director General of English-language production, from February 11, 2013, to February 26, 2014.

== Career ==
Her producing credits with the NFB included the documentary films Status Quo? The Unfinished Business of Feminism in Canada, Up the Yangtze, Reel Injun, Pink Ribbons, Inc. and Payback. Prior to working in production, Din served in a variety of positions at the NFB in marketing and management, including serving as the assistant director general for NFB English Program under Tom Perlmutter. In 2010, she was named to Playback magazine's "10 To Watch" list.

For Pink Ribbons, Inc., Din approached director Léa Pool after having researched and lived with the subject of breast cancer for six years. A breast cancer survivor, Din had been diagnosed at approximately the same time as she first read Samantha King's book Pink Ribbons Inc.: Breast Cancer and the Politics of Philanthropy and Barbara Ehrenreich’s autobiographical essay, Welcome to Cancerland.

It was Din who approached author Margaret Atwood to adapt Payback: Debt and the Shadow Side of Wealth as a documentary film. Atwood reports that they jointly settled on Jennifer Baichwal as director.

In 2009, working in collaboration with Studio XX, Din executive produced First Person Digital, a training and production program for women exploring new approaches to storytelling.

== Personal life ==
Din was born in Nairobi and raised in a Muslim family. She is a feminist.
