= Zo Reken =

- Directed by: Emanuel Licha
- Written by: Emanuel Licha
- Produced by: Emanuel Licha
- Cinematography: Étienne Roussy
- Edited by: Ariane Pétel-Despots
- Music by: David Drury
- Production company: Les Films de L'Autre
- Distributed by: Les Films du 3 mars
- Release date: April 29, 2021 (Hot Docs)
- Running time: 86 minutes
- Country: Canada
- Languages: French; Haitian Creole

Zo Reken is a Canadian documentary film, directed by Emanuel Licha and released in 2021. Taking its name from a Haitian Creole slang term for the Toyota Land Cruiser, the film is an exploration of the impact of the international humanitarian aid apparatus in Haiti, centering on the ways in which it can be both a necessary lifeline and an instrument of economic inequality and repression.

The film premiered at the 2021 Hot Docs Canadian International Documentary Festival, where it won the juried award for Best Canadian Feature Documentary. It won the award for Best Documentary Film at the 2021 Festival international du cinéma francophone en Acadie. At the 2021 Montreal International Documentary Festival, it won the Grand Prize, National Feature and the Student Jury Award, and received an honorable mention from the Magnus Isacsson Award jury.

It received two Canadian Screen Award nominations at the 11th Canadian Screen Awards in 2023, for Best Feature Length Documentary and Best Cinematography in a Documentary (Étienne Roussy).
