= A Rock and a Hard Place (film) =

- Directed by: Cliff Caines
- Written by: Cliff Caines
- Produced by: Cliff Caines; Lynne Kamm
- Cinematography: Ryan Randall
- Edited by: Cliff Caines; Roland Schlimme
- Music by: Tom Third
- Production company: Headframe Films
- Release date: May 1, 2015 (DOXA)
- Running time: 78 minutes
- Country: Canada
- Language: English

A Rock and a Hard Place is a Canadian documentary film, directed by Cliff Caines and released in 2015. The film is a portrait of the gold mining industry in Caines' hometown of Red Lake, depicting both the mining process itself and the thoughts of community members around proposals to demolish parts of the community to facilitate further exploration of gold deposits.

The film premiered at the 2015 DOXA Documentary Film Festival, where it received an honorable mention from the Colin Low Award jury.
