= Where I Am (film) =

- French: Là où je suis
- Directed by: Myriam Magassouba
- Written by: Myriam Magassouba
- Produced by: Marie-Claire Lalonde; Gabrielle Tougas-Fréchette
- Starring: Virginie Léger; Marie Brassard
- Cinematography: Geneviève Perron
- Edited by: Isabelle Malenfant; Sarah Fortin; Myriam Magassouba
- Music by: Daniel Campbell
- Production company: Voyous Films
- Distributed by: Travelling Distribution
- Release date: October 13, 2012 (FNC)
- Running time: 25 minutes
- Country: Canada
- Language: French

Where I Am (French: Là où je suis) is a Canadian drama film, directed by Myriam Magassouba and released in 2012. The film stars Virginie Léger as Mimi, a young woman in the Abitibi-Témiscamingue region of Quebec who is struggling to accept the death of her best friend in a car accident.

The cast also includes Marie Brassard as Mimi's mother.

The film won the Prix Jutra for Best Short Film at the 15th Jutra Awards in 2013.
