= Natacha Dufaux =

Canadian film editor

Natacha Dufaux is a Canadian film editor. She is most noted for her work on the films The Other Rio (L'Autre Rio), for which she received a Prix Iris nomination for Best Editing in a Documentary at the 21st Quebec Cinema Awards in 2019, and The Free Ones (Les Libres), for which she received a Canadian Screen Award nomination for Best Editing in a Documentary at the 9th Canadian Screen Awards in 2021.
