= Self-Portrait (2022 film) =

2022 documentary film

- Poster
- Directed by: Joële Walinga
- Edited by: Joële Walinga
- Distributed by: Mubi
- Release dates: 2022 (South by Southwest); March 20, 2023 (US and Canada)
- Countries: US; Canada

Self-Portrait is a 2022 Canadian documentary film made from unlocked surveillance footage collected from around the world. Directed and edited by Joële Walinga, the film is a curated collection of 166 shots taken from surveillance cameras, and follows the seasons of one single year. The film was made with the support of the Canada Council for the Arts and shown with the support of Telefilm Canada. All sound in the picture was created from scratch using foley and freesound downloads, and was designed by Walinga and Portuguese sound designer, Ines Adriana.

Self-Portrait had its world premiere at the 2022 South by Southwest film festival, won the Special Jury Prize for National Features at the Montreal International Documentary Film Festival in 2022, and was released on Mubi in the US and Canada on March 20, 2023.

== Synopsis ==
Directed by artist and filmmaker Joële Walinga, with sound design by Ines Adriana, Self-Portrait is a tapestry of footage collected from surveillance cameras around the world over the past four years, woven together as a poem. The film travels from moment to moment — from the frozen storminess of winter, to the melt of spring, the lush heat of summer, and, finally, to the decay and cooling of autumn: the dawn of winter. Self-Portrait takes a candid peek at humanity as it has chosen to document itself — all of these cameras set up primarily for capitalistic, “property”-protecting purposes, but yielding a beauty and a truth — an incidental portrait.

== Reception ==
The film was described as "pure cinema" by the head of film at South by Southwest Janet Pierson in Realscreen ahead of its world premiere. The film screened to mixed reviews, with some critics finding it aimless and boring, and others describing it as "mesmerizing," "a remarkable achievement." The film was included as a New York Times pick of international films to stream in spring 2024.

=== Film festivals ===
Self-Portrait had its World Premiere in March 2022 at the South by Southwest Film Festival in the Visions section. The film screened at festivals and programs including Jihlava International Documentary Film Festival, Prismatic Ground, the Montreal International Documentary Festival, and MDFF Selects among others.
