= Black Mother =

2018 documentary film by Khalik Allah

- Film poster
- Directed by: Khalik Allah
- Produced by: Khalik Allah; Leah Giblin
- Cinematography: Khalik Allah
- Edited by: Khalik Allah
- Music by: 4th Disciple
- Production company: Cinereach
- Distributed by: Grasshopper Film
- Release date: March 1, 2018 (True/False Film Festival)
- Running time: 77 minutes

Black Mother is a 2018 documentary film by American filmmaker Khalik Allah. It premiered at the 2018 True/False Film Festival in March, won a prize at The Montclair Film Festival, and was nominated for the Truer Than Fiction Award at the 35th Independent Spirit Awards.

Black Mother was released in theaters in the US on March 8, 2019 to critical acclaim.

== Synopsis ==
Director Khalik Allah revisits his ancestral homeland and records his spiritual, visual, and tactile journey through Jamaica, and his exploration of the depths and beauty he discovers in the island and the people living on it.

== Reception ==
=== Critical reception ===
On Rotten Tomatoes, the film holds an approval rating of 97% based on 30 reviews. The site's consensus reads: "A transfixing ode to geographic and familial roots, Black Mother pays poetic tribute to a place and culture from a brilliantly unique perspective." On Metacritic, the film has a weighted average score of 86 out of 100 based on 10 critics, indicating "universal acclaim".

Citing the film as his 9th favorite movie of 2019, K. Austin Collins of Vanity Fair wrote, "The film capitalizes on what Allah does best: an audio track mismatched from the visual landscape just so, so that words and images stand alone while also together, ricocheting and complicating each other. Allah films people at home, on the street, in the midst of giving birth; he compiles it all into an energetic meditation on maternity and identity that stirs the soul."

=== Awards and nominations ===
Year	Award	Category	Recipient	Result
2020	Independent Spirit Awards	Truer Than Fiction Award	Khalik Allah	Nominated

It won prizes at The Montclair Film Festival, The Indie Memphis Film Festival, and the Montréal Festival of New Cinema.

=== Film festivals ===
Black Mother was included in the lineups of film festivals including New Directors/New Films, AFI Fest, and International Film Festival Rotterdam.
