= The Mechanics of Borders =

2025 Canadian drama film

- French: La Mécanique des frontières
- Directed by: Hubert Caron-Guay
- Written by: Hubert Caron-Guay; Sophie B. Sylvestre
- Produced by: Maxime Bernard
- Starring: Dylan Walsh; Sophie Fekete; Ben Peters
- Cinematography: Étienne Roussy
- Edited by: Myriam Magassouba
- Music by: Christophe Lamarche-Ledoux
- Production company: Secteur Films
- Distributed by: Maison 4:3
- Release date: November 7, 2025 (Cinemania)
- Running time: 97 minutes
- Country: Canada
- Languages: French; English

The Mechanics of Borders (French: La Mécanique des frontières) is a Canadian drama film, directed by Hubert Caron-Guay and released in 2025. Caron-Guay's first narrative fiction film following a career in documentaries, the film stars Dylan Walsh as Mathieu, an aimless young man in Quebec who has little ambition beyond working at the local slaughterhouse and drinking with his friends in his free time; one day, however, he receives an unexpected phone call from his sister Heidi (Sophie Fekete), with whom he has had no contact since she ran off three years earlier to live in Tucson, Arizona, with her boyfriend Nathan (Ben Peters), tearfully asking him to come pick her up and drive her back home to Quebec.

The cast also includes Cat Lemieux, Clémence Carpentier, Tyrone Benskin and Robert Montcalm in supporting roles.

The film premiered at Cinemania in November 2025, before going into commercial release in May 2026.
