= Hervé Tullet =

French artist, performer, illustrator and children's literature author

- Born: 28 June 1958 (age 68); Avranches, Normandy, France
- Occupations: Children's books author, artist
- Writing career
- Genre: Children's literature

Hervé Tullet (born June 29, 1958) is a French artist, performer, illustrator and children's literature author who has written over 80 books. His 2010 book Press Here remained on The New York Times Best Seller list in the Children's Picture Books category for over 4 years.

== Biography ==
Tullet was born on June 29, 1958, in Avranches, France.

After studying illustration and visual communication, he worked for about ten years in advertising.

In the early 1990s, he started working as an illustrator for the press. In 1994, his first children's book, Comment papa a rencontré maman was published by Le Seuil. Recognition was not long in coming: he received the Non-Fiction Prize at the Bologna Children's Book Fair in 1998 for Faut pas confondre.

Tullet has written over 80 books translated in over 30 languages. His books favor following a path as opposed to a narrative. Tullet also lead workshops bringing together up to several hundred people. Among the space where they were held: Tate Modern, Library of Congress, MOMA and Guggenheim Museum.

Press Here (US 2011, orig published in France 2010 as Un livre) is his biggest success. This "interactive book" published in the United-States by Handprint Books/Chronicle Books has sold over 2 million copies throughout the world and has been translated into over 35 languages. It stayed on The New York Times Best Seller list in the Children's Picture Books category for over 4 years.

Tullet lives in New York in the United-States since 2015 where he created several exhibitions at the Invisible Dog Art Center and at the Children's Museum of Pittsburgh.

In 2018, Tullet held his first retrospective in Korea at the Seoul Arts Center in Seoul, Korea.

Tullet also launched The Ideal Exhibition with Hervé Tullet in 2018, a multifaceted collaborative project based on his art, aesthetics and philosophy. The project consists of videoworkshops in the form of a web series and a sharing device in the form of a collective virtual exhibition.

== Books ==
Tullet has written over 80 books since 1994, including:

- Press Here, Handprint Books/Chronicle Books, 2010
- Doodle Cook, Phaidon, 2013
- Mix It Up, Handprint Books/Chronicle Books, 2014
- Herve Tullet's Art Workshops for Children, Phaidon, 2015
- Say Zoop, Handprint Books/Chronicle Books, 2017
- I Have an Idea, Handprint Books/Chronicle Books, 2018
