= Forest for the Trees (film) =

2021 Canadian documentary film

- Directed by: Rita Leistner
- Written by: Rita Leistner
- Produced by: Rita Leistner
- Cinematography: Rita Leistner
- Edited by: Darby MacInnis
- Music by: Kevin Quain
- Production company: Leistner Pictures
- Distributed by: Syndicado
- Release date: May 6, 2021 (DOXA)
- Running time: 91 minutes
- Country: Canada
- Language: English

Forest for the Trees is a Canadian documentary film, directed by Rita Leistner and released in 2021. The film documents a group of tree planters in British Columbia, and the challenging and arduous conditions they deal with in the process of the job.

The film premiered on May 6, 2021, at the DOXA Documentary Film Festival. It was released alongside a companion book by Leistner and Don McKellar, featuring her photographs of tree planters.

Leistner received a Canadian Screen Award nomination for Best Cinematography in a Documentary at the 10th Canadian Screen Awards in 2022.
