= At All Kosts =

- Haitian Creole: Koutkékout
- Directed by: Joseph Hillel
- Produced by: Joseph Hillel
- Cinematography: Nicolas Canniccioni
- Edited by: Heidi Haines
- Production company: Quatre par Quatre Films
- Release date: November 16, 2024 (IDFA)
- Running time: 84 minutes
- Countries: Canada; Haiti
- Languages: Haitian Creole; French

At All Kosts (Haitian Creole: Koutkékout) is a Canadian documentary film, directed by Joseph Hillel and released in 2024. The film profiles the Festival 4 Chemins, an art and theatre festival in Port-au-Prince, Haiti, whose organizers are determined to stage the festival despite the political instability of the country.

The film premiered at the International Documentary Film Festival Amsterdam on November 16, 2024, and had its Canadian premiere at the Montreal International Documentary Festival on November 25. It went into commercial release in May 2025.

== Accolades ==
Award	Date of ceremony	Category	Recipient	Result	Ref.
Montreal International Documentary Festival	2024	Magnus Isacsson Award	Joseph Hillel	Honored	
Quebec Cinema Awards	2025	Best Editing in a Documentary	Heidi Haines	Nominated	
