= Hubert Caron-Guay =

Canadian film director

Hubert Caron-Guay is a Canadian film director from Montreal, Quebec. He is most noted for his 2017 documentary film Destierros, which was a Prix Iris nominee for Best Documentary Film at the 20th Quebec Cinema Awards in 2018.

An alumnus of the Université du Québec à Montréal, he began his career as an assistant director to Rodrigue Jean on Love in the Time of Civil War (L’amour au temps de la guerre civile), and as full co-director with Jean of the short documentary Épopée, L'état du moment in 2011 and the feature documentary The State of the World (L'État du monde) in 2012. The latter film received a special mention from the National Feature prize jury at the 2012 Montreal International Documentary Festival.

Destierros premiered at Visions du Réel in 2017, and was screened at RIDM later in the year, before going into wider commercial release in 2018.

He followed up in 2021 with Resources (Ressources), codirected with Serge-Olivier Rondeau.

His first narrative fiction film, The Mechanics of Borders (La Mécanique des frontières), premiered at Cinemania in November 2025, before going into commercial release in May 2026.

== Filmography ==
- L'État du moment - 2011, with Rodrigue Jean
- The State of the World (L'État du monde) - 2012, with Rodrigue Jean
- Destierros - 2017
- Resources (Ressources) - 2021, with Serge-Olivier Rondeau
- The Mechanics of Borders (La Mécanique des frontières) - 2025
