= Destierros =

- Film poster
- Directed by: Hubert Caron-Guay
- Written by: Hubert Caron-Guay
- Produced by: Hubert Caron-Guay
- Cinematography: Étienne Roussy
- Edited by: Ariane Pétel-Despots
- Music by: Colin Stetson
- Production company: Les Films de l'autre
- Distributed by: Les Films du 3 mars
- Release dates: April 26, 2017 (Visions du Réel); January 19, 2018 (Canada)
- Running time: 12 minutes
- Country: Canada
- Language: Spanish

Destierros is a 2017 Canadian documentary film, directed by Hubert Caron-Guay. The film centres on migrants from Central America who are desperate to emigrate to the United States or Canada for a better life, amid the context of Donald Trump's attempts to close the US-Mexican border.

The film premiered at the 2017 Visions du Réel in Nyon, Switzerland. It received four Prix Iris nominations at the 20th Quebec Cinema Awards, for Best Documentary Film, Best Cinematography in a Documentary (Étienne Roussy), Best sound in a Documentary (Alexis Pilon-Gladu and Samuel Gagnon-Thibodeau) and Best Editing in a Documentary (Ariane Pétel-Despots).

Destierros was released in theatres on 19 January 2018.
