= Don't Worry, the Doors Will Open =

2019 documentary film

- Ukrainian: Ne khvylyuysya, dveri vidchynyatsya
- Directed by: Oksana Karpovych
- Written by: Oksana Karpovych
- Produced by: Ina Fichman; Judith Plamondon
- Cinematography: Christopher Nunn
- Edited by: Dominique Sicotte; Lessandro Sócrates
- Production company: Intuitive Pictures
- Release date: November 18, 2019 (RIDM)
- Running time: 75 minutes
- Countries: Canada; Ukraine
- Language: Ukrainian

Don't Worry, the Doors Will Open (Ukrainian: «Не хвилюйся, двері відчиняться», romanized: Ne khvyliujsia, dveri vidchyniatsia) is a Ukrainian-Canadian documentary film, directed by Oksana Karpovych and released in 2019. The film centres on the Soviet-era electrichka trains that are still in operation in and around Kyiv, and the poor and working-class commuters who still use them on a regular basis.

The film premiered at the 2019 Montreal International Documentary Festival, where it won the New Vision Award. In 2020 it was screened at the Hot Docs Canadian International Documentary Festival and at DocuDays UA in Ukraine.

The film was a nominee for the Directors Guild of Canada's DGC Discovery Award in 2020.
