= The Ideal Exhibition with Hervé Tullet =

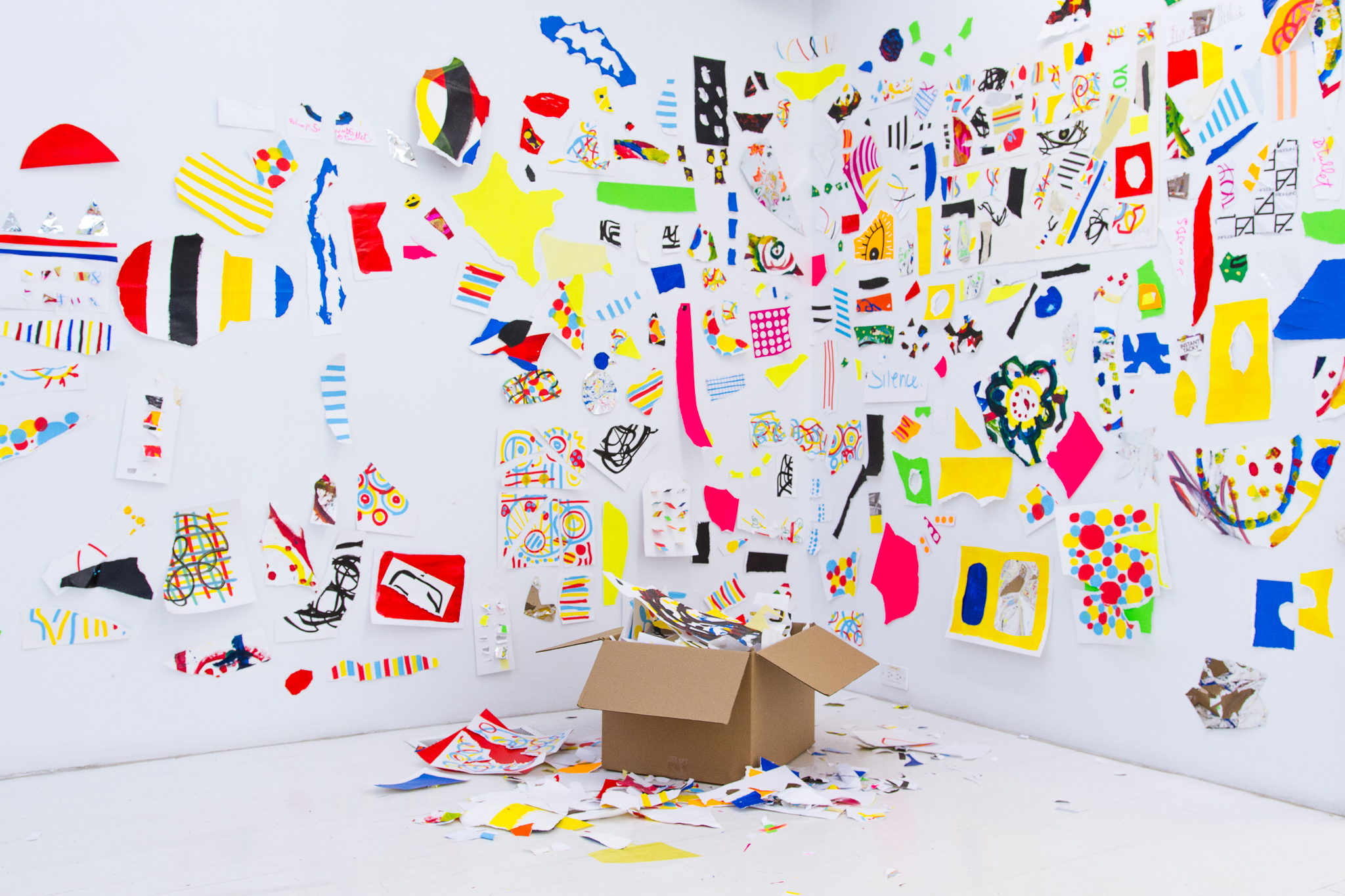
- Filming place of The Ideal Exhibition with Hervé Tullet
- Genre: Documentary; live painting
- Created by: Hervé Tullet; Tobo
- Country of origin: Canada
- No. of seasons: 1
- No. of episodes: 22

Production
- Executive producer: Florence Roche
- Producer: Solen Labrie Trépanier
- Running time: 3 minutes 45 seconds
- Production company: Studio TOBO

Original release
- Network: BaYaM
- Release: 18 November 2018 – May 3, 2019

The Ideal Exhibition with Hervé Tullet is a call to creation launched by the artist and author of youth book Hervé Tullet. The project consists of video workshops in the form of a web series and a sharing device in the form of a collective virtual exhibition.

== The artistic project ==
The project "The Ideal Exhibition with Hervé Tullet" proposes to everyone to realize his exhibition by following the gestures and pieces easy to realize of the artist and illustrator Hervé Tullet.

Result of a performance at the Livart Art Gallery in Montreal, in which Hervé Tullet holed, tore, folded, turned and assembled pieces, the first Ideal Exhibition was set up. This exhibition, composed of the creations made during the art residency, inaugurates the movement of The Ideal Exhibition, which invites everyone to create their own pieces.

In parallel with this movement of collective creation, a web series drawn from the performance of Hervé Tullet offers video workshops and interviews with the artist so that everyone can draw inspiration from them and explore new playgrounds.

Participant creations shared with the #expoideale hashtag are then aggregated and visible to everyone on the digital mosaic of the project's website.

== The webseries ==
The webseries part of the project consists of 22 episodes of creation, recreation and inspiration as well as 8 workshops to be followed alone or in groups. Each video is a laboratory of experimentation so that everyone can realize its ideal Expo.

The artist Hervé Tullet is the conductor of the project. He transmits to the public his creative techniques using colors, papers, brushes, scissors and other materials conducive to the visual arts.

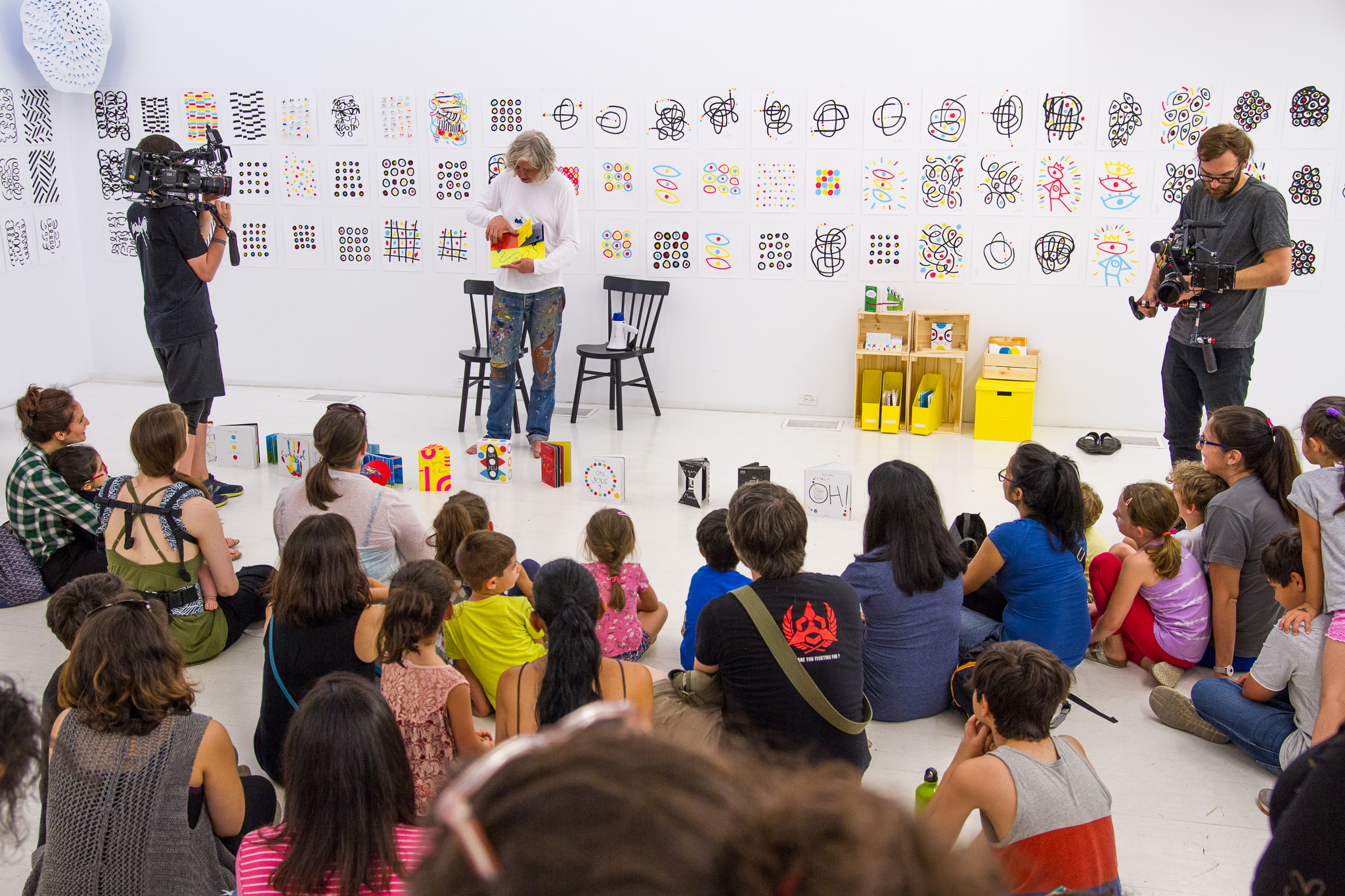
Reading workshop at the Livart

== The episodes ==
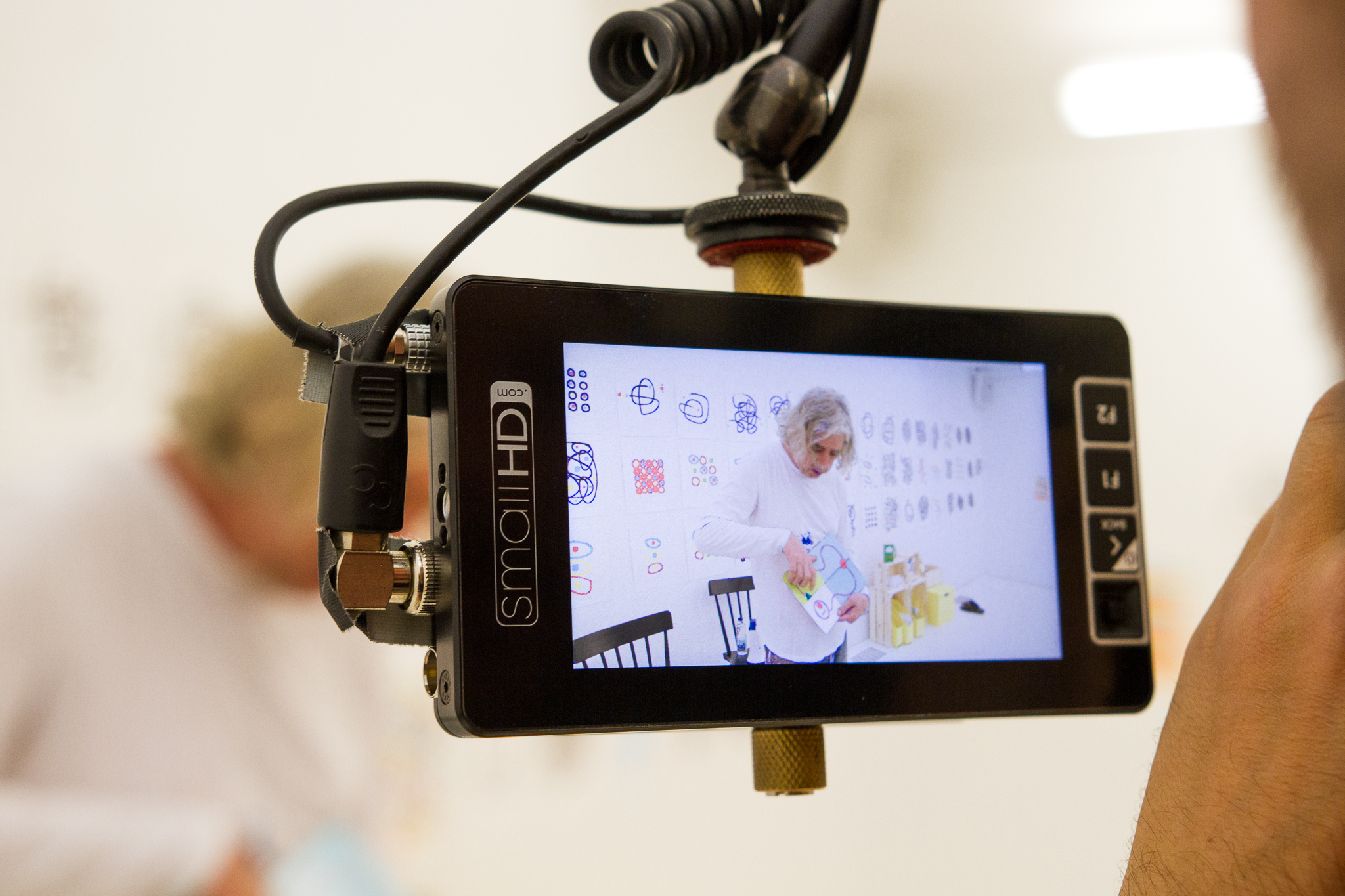
Show at the Livart

- What is the ideal exhibition with Hervé Tullet?
- How to make an ideal Expo?
- Recreation: the dice game
- Recreation: the sumo game
- Recreation: bottling
- Recreation: flowers
- Recreation: sounds and music
- Creation: Scotch
- Creation: the lines
- Creation: the spots
- Creation: the holes
- Creation: small windows
- Creation: the collection of papers
- Creation: large windows
- Creation: paths
- Creation: totems
- Creation: the mosaic
- Creation: the mobile
- Creation: crumpled spots
- Creation: folded spots
- Creation: the wall
- How are ideas born?

== Group workshops ==
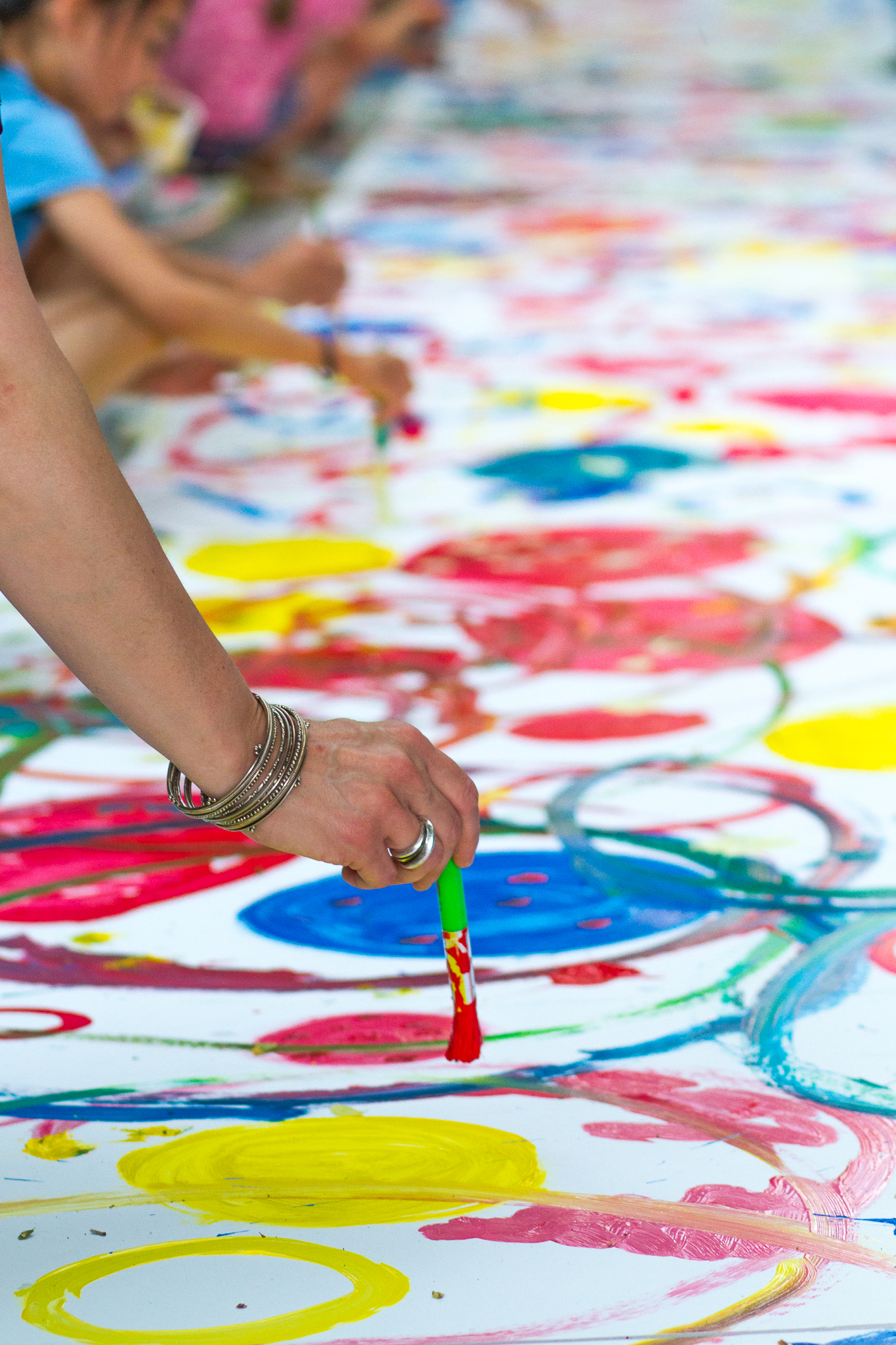
Flowers workshop

- Group workshop: reading
- Group workshop: flowers
- Group Workshop: sound # 1
- Group Workshop: sound # 2
- Group Workshop: Sound # 3
- Group Workshop: Sound # 4
- Group Workshop: Sound # 5
- Group Workshop: Sound # 6

== Technical sheet ==
- Title: The ideal exhibition with Hervé Tullet
- Animated and co-created by: Hervé Tullet
- Director: Vali Fugulin
- Producers: Florence Roche and Solen Labrie Trépanier
- Photo Director: Étienne Roussy
- Cameraman: Antoine Turcotte
- Soundman: Carl-André Hernandez
- Artistic director of stage, accessories: Josie-Anne Lemieux
- Assistant props: Josianne Desrochers
- Stage assistant: Frédérik Labrie Trépanier
- Director of Production and Post-Production: Solen Labrie Trépanier
- Editor: Marie-Elaine Chénier
- Editing assistant: Post-Modern
- Artistic director post production: Mathieu Lampron
- Graphic designers: Martin Durand and Francis Lizotte-Bédard
- Music Designer: XS MUSIC
- Communications and Marketing Strategist: Gaëlle Saules
- Animation of social networks: Laure Neria
- Website: Virginie Lesiège, Raphael-Moon Duquet-Cormier, Marie-Claude Poulin, Yanick Legault, Assya Nikolova, Patrick Coulombe
- Translator: Jennifer Mierau
- A production: Tobo Studio

With the financial participation of Bell Fund, Bayam and Bayard Youth.
