= Oksana Karpovych =

Ukrainian-Canadian documentary filmmaker

- Оксана Карпович
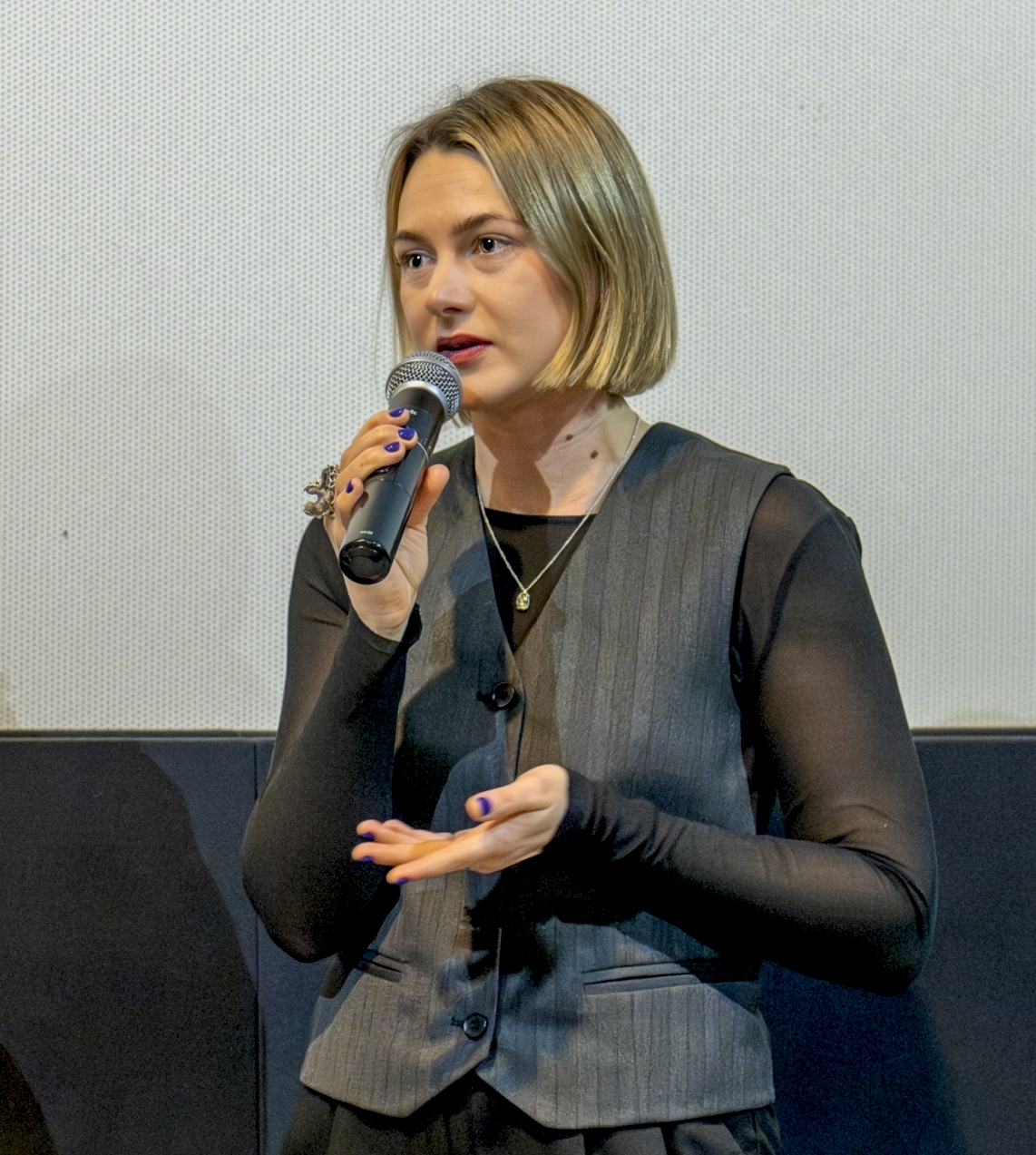
- Born: 1990 (age 35–36); Kyiv, Ukraine
- Education: Kyiv Mohyla Academy
- Occupation: Filmmaker
- Notable work: Intercepted

Oksana Karpovych (born 1990) is a Ukrainian documentary film director, most noted for her 2024 film Intercepted.

Originally from Kyiv, she moved to Canada in the 2010s to study documentary filmmaking at the Mel Hoppenheim School of Cinema.

Her first documentary film, Don't Worry, the Doors Will Open (Ne khvylyuysya, dveri vidchynyatsya), premiered at the 2019 Montreal International Documentary Festival, where it won the New Vision Award. It was a nominee for the Directors Guild of Canada's DGC Discovery Award in 2020.

Intercepted premiered at the 2024 Berlin Film Festival, and was subsequently screened at the 2024 Hot Docs Canadian International Documentary Festival. It won the Grand Prize for National Feature at the 2024 Montreal International Documentary Festival, and was a shortlisted finalist for the 2026 Prix Luc-Perreault.
