= Ghaith Abdul-Ahad =

Iraqi journalist (born 1975)

- Born: 1975 (age 50–51); Baghdad, Iraq
- Occupations: Journalist; Freelance photographer
- Known for: Documenting various wars and conflicts for high-profile newspapers

Ghaith Abdul-Ahad (Arabic: غيث عبدالأحد, born 1975) is an Iraqi journalist who began working after the U.S. invasion. Abdul-Ahad has written for The Guardian and The Washington Post and published photographs in The New York Times, The Washington Post, Los Angeles Times, The Guardian, The Times (London), and other media outlets. Besides reporting from his native Iraq, he has also reported from Somalia, Sudan, Afghanistan, Libya and Syria.

Abdul-Ahad has received the Martha Gellhorn Prize for Journalism, the James Cameron Memorial Trust Award, the British Press Awards' Foreign Reporter of the Year and the Orwell Prize.

Author of the book A Stranger in Your Own City: Travels in the Middle East's Long War, published on March 14, 2023, in which he describes how he, and other Iraqis, experienced life and war in Iraq before and after the invasion and occupation.

== Background ==
Abdul-Ahad was born in Baghdad, Iraq in 1975. He studied architecture at Baghdad University and had never traveled outside Iraq prior to the 2003 invasion of Iraq. As a deserter from Saddam Hussein's Iraqi army, he lived underground in Baghdad for six years, having to change his residence every few months in order to avoid detection and arrest.

He began doing street photography in 2001 and was determined to document conditions in Baghdad during the war. This aroused suspicion, and he was arrested three days before the end of major combat operations, though he was able to escape by bribing his guards.

== Career ==
After the 2003 invasion of Iraq, Abdul-Ahad became a freelance photographer for Getty Images and journalist, writing for the British newspaper The Guardian from 2004.

In October 2005, he published his book Unembedded: Four Independent Photojournalists on the War in Iraq which features his photography along with that of Kael Alford, Thorne Anderson and Rita Leistner.

In October 2010 Abdul-Ahad was imprisoned for five days by the Taliban fighters he had gone to interview.

In late February 2011 Abdul-Ahad entered Libya to report on the Libyan civil war. He was detained on 2 March by the Libyan Army in the town of Sabratha. His traveling companion, the Brazilian journalist Andrei Netto of O Estado de S. Paulo was released on 10 March, with Netto attributing his release to the good relationship between Brazil and Libya. On 13 March Amnesty International and others called for Abdul-Ahad to be released; he was finally released on 16 March, after the Turkish government assisted negotiations and editor Alan Rusbridger flew to Tripoli.

Abdul-Ahad's most recent work revolves around the Syrian Civil War focusing on the rebels and their stalemate between determined loyalists.

== Awards ==
- Martha Gellhorn Prize for Journalism, 2005
- James Cameron Memorial Trust Award, 2007
- British Press Awards Foreign Reporter of the Year, 2008
- The Orwell Prize for Journalism, 2014
- News & Documentary Emmy Awards for Best Story in a News Magazine and Outstanding Coverage of a Breaking News Story in a News Magazine, 2017

== See also ==
- List of solved missing person cases (2010s)
