= Kenbe la, Until We Win =

- French: Kenbe la, jusqu'à la victoire
- Directed by: Will Prosper
- Written by: Will Prosper
- Produced by: Nathalie Cloutier
- Starring: Alain Philoctète; Chantal Ismé
- Cinematography: Vanessa Abadhir
- Edited by: Natalie Lamoureux
- Music by: André Courcy; Jenny Salgado
- Production company: National Film Board of Canada
- Release date: November 19, 2019 (RIDM)
- Running time: 83 minutes
- Country: Canada
- Languages: French; Haitian Creole

Kenbe la, Until We Win (French: Kenbe la, jusqu'à la victoire) is a Canadian documentary film, directed by Will Prosper and released in 2019. The film profiles Haitian Canadian artist and activist Alain Philoctète, as he tries to establish a permaculture project in Haiti as his final legacy toward his birth country, while battling the terminal cancer that would ultimately take his life in 2020.

The film premiered at the 2019 Montreal International Documentary Festival, where it was the winner of the People's Choice Award, before going into commercial release in 2020.

The film was longlisted for the Directors Guild of Canada's DGC Discovery Award in 2020.
