= The Other Rio =

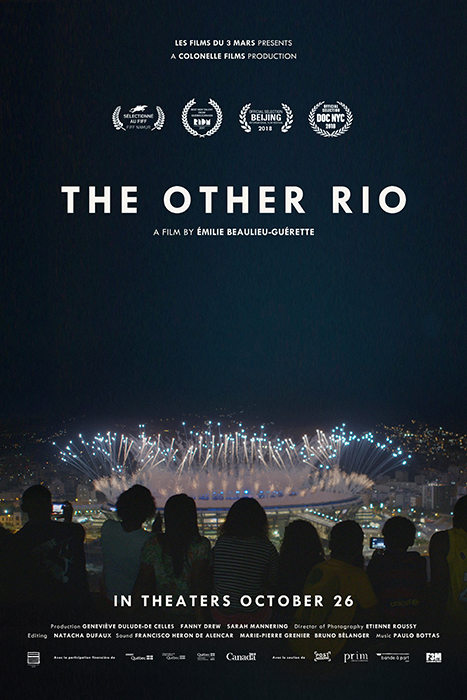
- Film poster
- French: L'Autre Rio
- Directed by: Émilie B. Guérette
- Written by: Émilie B. Guérette
- Produced by: Fanny Drew; Geneviève Dulude-De Celles; Sarah Mannering
- Cinematography: Étienne Roussy
- Edited by: Natacha Dufaux
- Music by: Paulo Bottas
- Production company: Colonelle Films
- Release date: November 15, 2017 (MIDF)
- Running time: 88 minutes
- Country: Canada

The Other Rio (French: L'Autre Rio) is a Canadian documentary film, directed by Émilie B. Guérette and released in 2017. Set against the backdrop of the 2016 Summer Olympics in Rio de Janeiro, the film profiles a community of squatters living in poverty who are left out of the public image the city is trying to cultivate on the international stage.

The film premiered in 2017 at the Montreal International Documentary Festival.

In 2019, Étienne Roussy received a Canadian Screen Award nomination for Best Cinematography in Documentary at the 7th Canadian Screen Awards.
