= Everest Dark =

- Directed by: Jereme Watt
- Written by: Jereme Watt; Michael Bodnarchuk
- Produced by: Michael Bodnarchuk; Merit Jensen Carr; Jereme Watt
- Starring: Mingma Tsiri Sherpa
- Cinematography: Kyle Sandilands
- Edited by: Joni Church; Alan Flett
- Music by: Colin Aguiar
- Production companies: Merit Motion Pictures; Intuitive Pictures; Killawatt Productions; Michael Bodnarchuk Productions
- Distributed by: Killawatt Productions
- Release date: March 22, 2025 (CPH:DOX)
- Running time: 88 minutes
- Country: Canada
- Language: English

Everest Dark is a Canadian documentary film, directed by Jereme Watt and released in 2025. The film profiles Mingma Tsiri Sherpa, a retired Nepalese mountain guide who has taken on a personal mission to recover the bodies of mountaineers who died on Mount Everest.

The film premiered at CPH:DOX in March 2025.

== Accolades ==
Award	Date of ceremony	Category	Recipient	Result	Ref.
Canadian Screen Awards	2026	Best Cinematography in a Documentary	Kyle Sandilands	Pending	
