= Jean-François Lesage =

Canadian documentary filmmaker

Jean-François Lesage is a Canadian documentary filmmaker, most noted for his 2020 film Prayer for a Lost Mitten (Prière pour une mitaine perdue).

The brother of filmmaker Philippe Lesage, his first credit as a filmmaker was a collaboration with his brother on the 2009 short documentary How Can You Tell If the Little Fish Are Happy? (Comment savoir si les petits poissons sont heureux?). His feature debut was in 2013 with A Mile End Tale (Conte du Mile End).

His 2015 film A Summer Love (Un amour d'été) won the Grand Prize for National Feature at the 2015 Montreal International Documentary Festival. He won special jury prizes at RIDM for The Hidden River (La rivière cachée) in 2017, and for Prayer for a Lost Mitten in 2020. Prayer for a Lost Mitten also won the Best Canadian Feature Documentary award at the 2020 Hot Docs Canadian International Documentary Festival, and was a Canadian Screen Award nominee for Best Feature Length Documentary at the 10th Canadian Screen Awards in 2022.

In 2024 he released Among Mountains and Streams (Parmi les montagnes et les ruisseaux), which was a Quebec Cinema Award nominee for Best Documentary at the 27th Quebec Cinema Awards in 2025.
