= Rita Leistner =

Canadian cinematographer and photographer

Rita Leistner is a Canadian photographer and filmmaker. She is most noted for her 2021 documentary film Forest for the Trees, for which she was a Canadian Screen Award nominee for Best Cinematography in a Documentary at the 10th Canadian Screen Awards in 2022.

She was active as a photojournalist in the 2000s, most notably covering the Iraq War. Some of her war photography was included in the 2006 book Unembedded: Four Independent Photojournalists on the War in Iraq, alongside photography by Ghaith Abdul-Ahad, Kael Alford and Thorne Anderson.

== Selected works ==
During the COVID-19 pandemic, Leistner collaborated with filmmaker Don McKellar on Infinite Distance – Nocturnal Pandemic Urban Dreams, a photographic series made at night in Toronto. The project used long exposures and experimental lighting to create staged, dreamlike compositions.

In 2026, Leistner's photographic series The Tree Planters was exhibited at the Red Deer Museum + Art Gallery in Alberta. The exhibition was circulated by the McMichael Canadian Art Collection with support from the Canada Council for the Arts.
