= Status Quo? The Unfinished Business of Feminism in Canada =

- Directed by: Karen Cho
- Written by: Karen Cho
- Produced by: Ravida Din
- Cinematography: Katerine Giguère
- Edited by: Barbara Brown
- Music by: Lorraine Segato
- Production company: National Film Board of Canada
- Distributed by: National Film Board of Canada
- Release date: 2012
- Running time: 87 minutes
- Country: Canada
- Language: English

Status Quo? The Unfinished Business of Feminism in Canada is a 2012 Canadian documentary film about the state of feminism in Canada, directed by Karen Cho and produced by Ravida Din for the National Film Board of Canada.

== Synopsis ==
The documentary combines archival material with contemporary stories, juxtaposing scenes from the 1967 Royal Commission on the Status of Women with the 2nd Pan-Canadian Young Feminist Gathering in 2011 in Winnipeg, organized by the rebELLEs movement. It explores the progress made on concerns raised 45 years ago: universal childcare, violence against women and abortion access. The documentary uses video recordings from the past to justify the arguments being made about present day. This shows how the problems women battled in the 20th century are similar to the issues women face in the 21st century. Although there are not a lot of video recordings shown from the past, since there is more emphasis on present day issues, the videos that are shown are powerful and relevant. For example, there is a video recording of men in the House of Commons laughing at a woman who is claiming 1/10 women are suffering from domestic violence. There is also a commercial created during World War II advertising the childcare the government offered woman so that they could take over the men's jobs while they fought overseas. It is primary sources like these past recordings that help strengthen the arguments being made about women in the present.

== Production ==
Cho has stated that when she was approached by producer Ravida Din, she didn't know much about feminism and thought that most of the battles had already been won. In making the film, she had been shocked that "so many of the issues are still around today":

When I was talking with women through the research, I realized that a lot of these issues that were brought up in the past or fought for in the past, they continue to be concerns for women, in some ways, women are losing grounds on rights that might have already been won or it's issues like, in the case of childcare and violence, that are still continuing.

Cho stated in March 2013 that she began research on what was originally planned as an historical film on feminism five years earlier, and did not consider herself a feminist before she conducted her research.

== Release ==
The film was named best documentary at the Whistler Film Festival. The film was streamed for free at NFB.ca in conjunction with International Women's Day, and as of March 2013, was being screened at more than 60 events across Canada, with support from the YWCA, the Canadian Federation of University Women, Cinema Politica and public libraries.
