= Will Prosper =

Haitian Canadian filmmaker and activist

Wieland (Will) Prosper is a Haitian Canadian filmmaker and activist from Montreal, Quebec. He is most noted for his 2019 film Kenbe la, Until We Win (Kenbe la, jusqu'à la victoire), which won the People's Choice Award at the 2019 Montreal International Documentary Festival, and was longlisted for the Directors Guild of Canada's DGC Discovery Award in 2020.

== Background ==
As a teenager he was associated with Dope Squad, a breakdancing crew which began engaging in criminal gang activity long after Prosper left it. He was later a Royal Canadian Mounted Police officer from 1988 to 2001, but left that job after being accused of conducting unauthorized background searches on Steve Bernavil, a former Dope Squad colleague who was under investigation as a murder suspect at the time but was later cleared of involvement in the case.

== Activism ==
He began his activism in 2008 after the shooting of Fredy Villanueva, as a co-founder of Montréal-Nord Républik, an organization that provides community legal aid to residents of the Montreal borough of Montréal-Nord and other projects to combat racism. The organization has since been renamed Hoodstock.

== Filmmaking ==
As a filmmaker his projects have included the documentary films Républik Basket and Aller Simple: Haiti, and the television series Black Life: Untold Stories. In 2020 he directed the music video for "Tout recommencer", a supergroup single of Quebec hip-hop musicians released in support of Hoodstock, whose participants included Imposs, Shreez, Tizzo, Sarahmée, Marco Volcy, Rosalvo and Meryem Saci.

He also served as a script consultant on Anaïs Barbeau-Lavalette's 2022 film White Dog (Chien blanc).

== Political activity ==
He ran as a Québec solidaire candidate in Bourassa-Sauvé for the 2012 Quebec general election, and was a Projet Montréal candidate for mayor of Montréal-Nord in the 2021 Montreal municipal election.

His 2021 candidacy was marred by the revelation of the circumstances behind his departure from the RCMP, with political opponents and media falsely accusing him of direct personal involvement in criminal activity. Projet Montréal leader Valérie Plante expressed confidence in Prosper's candidacy, noting that his record as a community leader and filmmaker should demonstrate that he was far more than just one ethical mistake from decades earlier. He lost the election to incumbent borough mayor Christine Black.

== Electoral record ==
2012 Quebec general election
Party	Candidate	Votes	%	±%
Liberal	Rita de Santis	12,518	42.28	-19.05
Parti Québécois	Marianne Dessureault	8,092	27.33	+0.46
Coalition Avenir Québec	Louis Pelletier	5,165	17.44	+8.88
Québec solidaire	Will Prosper	3,045	10.28	+7.04
Green	Eric Guerra-Grenier Jr.	465	1.57	
Option nationale	Nancy Lavallée	324	1.09	–
Total valid votes		29,609	98.10	–
Total rejected ballots		575	1.90	–
Turnout		30,184	64.17	+16.49
Electors on the lists		47,036	–	–
