= Lesley Loksi Chan =

Canadian video artist and documentary filmmaker

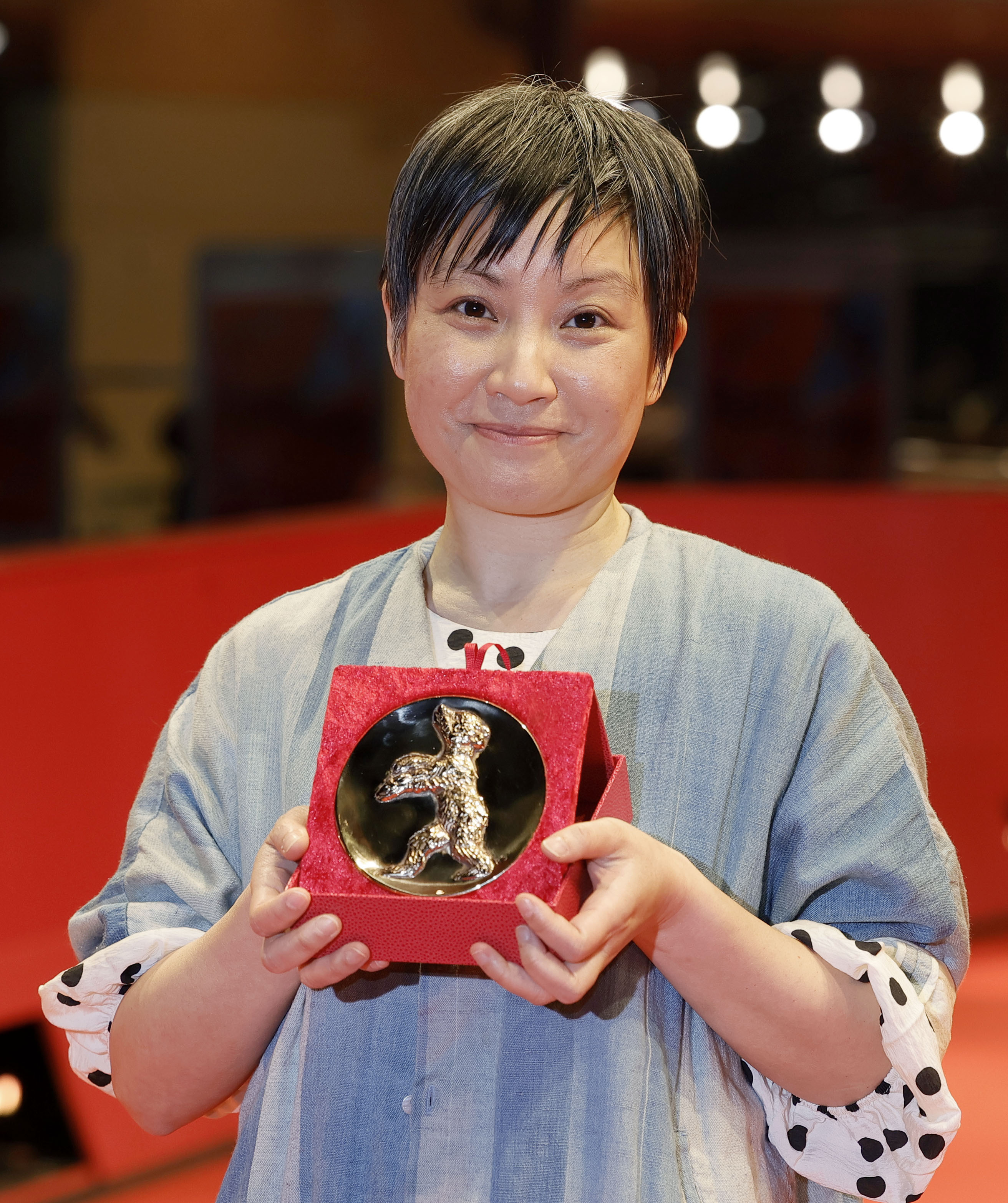
- Born: 1978 (age 47–48); Hamilton, Ontario, Canada
- Education: York University
- Occupations: Video artist, documentary filmmaker
- Years active: 2000s–present

Lesley Loksi Chan (born 1978) is a Canadian video artist from Hamilton, Ontario, most noted for her 2025 film Lloyd Wong, Unfinished.

The film, a documentary based on the unfinished video diaries of Chinese-Canadian artist Lloyd Wong prior to his death of HIV/AIDS in 1994, premiered at the 75th Berlin International Film Festival, where it won both the Golden Bear for Best Short Film, and the Teddy Award for Best LGBTQ Short Film. It subsequently won the award for Best National Short or Medium-Length Film at the 2025 Montreal International Documentary Festival, and was named to the Toronto International Film Festival's annual year-end Canada's Top Ten list for 2025.

Her other films have included My Matsura (2006), Wanda & Miles (2007), Curse Cures (2009), Redress Remix (2010) and The Urge to Run a Lap (2017).
