= Everything Will Be =

- Directed by: Julia Kwan
- Written by: Julia Kwan
- Produced by: David Christensen (for the National Film Board of Canada)
- Starring: Granny Kwan, Bob Rennie
- Cinematography: Patrick McLaughlin
- Production company: National Film Board of Canada
- Release date: 2014
- Country: Canada
- Languages: Cantonese, English

Everything Will Be is a 2014 documentary film about the changing face of Vancouver's Chinatown, directed by Julia Kwan and produced by David Christensen for the National Film Board of Canada. Everything Will Be was the first documentary film for Kwan, whose first feature Eve and the Fire Horse was a fictional comic account of growing up Chinese in Vancouver.

== Production ==
Kwan and Christensen had initially explored the idea of making a film that contrasted Vancouver’s fading Chinatown with the thriving Golden Village in nearby Richmond, until Kwan realized her passion was in documenting Chinatown’s historic sites and businesses before they disappeared: "One day I was walking down Pender Street and within a two-block radius I counted like 20 shuttered shops … herbalists and knick-knack shops and green grocers. I think I was inspired to make this film from that ache I felt for the Chinatown of my childhood."

Kwan has described the film as "an observational, immersive documentary, inspired by Frederick Wiseman," and prepared for the film by walking the streets of Chinatown with her cinematographer. Since she characterizes her own command of Cantonese as "highly suspect," Kwan had a researcher and translator with her much of the time. She found herself drawn to the stories of elderly residents, who reminded her of her own parents and the people she grew up with.

Area residents featured in Everything Will Be include an elderly newspaper seller known as Granny Kwan, and a security guard who's worked in the area for 20 years, who helped the filmmaker convince doubtful area residents to participate in the film. The film's title is inspired by a neon installation by Martin Creed, which reads "Everything is going to be alright," overlooking the neighbourhood from atop real estate developer Bob Rennie's art museum in Chinatown’s Wing Sang building. Rennie is also featured in the film.

== Release ==
The film premiered at the 2014 Hot Docs Canadian International Documentary Festival, followed by the Vancouver International Film Festival.

Patrick McLaughlin won the Canadian Screen Award for Best Cinematography in a Documentary at the 3rd Canadian Screen Awards.
