= Myriam Magassouba =

Canadian film editor and director

Myriam Magassouba is a Canadian film editor and director from Quebec. She is most noted for her short film Where I Am (Là où je suis), for which she won the Jutra Award for Best Live Action Short Film at the 15th Jutra Awards in 2013.

== Filmography ==
=== Editor ===
- All That We Make (Fermières) - 2013
- Gaspé Copper - 2013
- Star - 2015
- Mahalia Melts in the Rain - 2018
- The Depths (Les Profondeurs) - 2019
- Jarvik - 2019
- Fanmi - 2021
- Like the Ones I Used to Know (Les grandes claques) - 2021
- No Ghost in the Morgue - 2022
- À la vie à l'amor - 2022
- Family Game (Arsenault et fils) - 2022
- How to Get Your Parents to Divorce (Pas d'chicane dans ma cabane !) - 2022
- Making Babies (Faire un enfant) - 2023
- Elsewhere at Night (Ailleurs la nuit) - 2025
- I Lost Sight of the Landscape (J'ai perdu de vue le paysage) - 2025
- The Mechanics of Borders (La Mécanique des frontières) - 2025

=== Director ===
- J'attendais - 2004
- Sur le quai de la gare - 2005
- Where I Am (Là où je suis) - 2012

== Awards ==
Award	Year	Category	Work	Result	Ref(s)
Canadian Screen Awards	2015	Best Editing in a Documentary	All That We Make (Fermières)	Nominated	
Jutra/Iris Awards	2013	Best Live Action Short Film	Where I Am (Là où je suis)	Won	
Jutra/Iris Awards	2023	Best Editing	Family Game (Arsenault et fils)	Nominated	
