= Ryan Randall =

Canadian cinematographer

Ryan Randall is a Canadian cinematographer. He is most noted for the documentary film Workhorse, for which he won the Canadian Screen Award for Best Cinematography in a Documentary at the 9th Canadian Screen Awards in 2021.

His other credits have included the short films Die Mütter, Locus, A Life of Errors, Loudly, Death Unties, I Love a Luger, Spring, 8 Count, Yeah Rite, Emilie and Barbital, and the documentary films A Rock and a Hard Place and Data Mining the Deceased: Ancestry and the Business of Family.

An associate member of the Canadian Society of Cinematographers, he is currently technical director of the media lab and an adjunct lecturer in the School of Film and Media at Queen's University.
