= Cliff Caines =

Canadian documentary filmmaker

Cliff Caines is a Canadian documentary filmmaker originally from Red Lake, Ontario. He is most noted for his 2015 film A Rock and a Hard Place, a film about mining life in Red Lake which received an honorable mention for the Colin Low Award at the 2015 DOXA Documentary Film Festival.

Prior to A Rock and a Hard Place, Caines directed the short films Die Mütter, Locus, Stryker Diary and Emilie.

His second feature documentary film, Workhorse, was released in 2019.
