= Present.Perfect. (2019 film) =

2019 Chinese documentary film

- Film poster
- Directed by: Shengze Zhu
- Produced by: Zhengfan Yang
- Edited by: Shengze Zhu
- Production companies: Burn The Film; Tender Madness Pictures
- Release date: January 27, 2019 (Rotterdam)
- Running time: 124 minutes
- Language: Mandarin Chinese

Present.Perfect. (Mandarin Chinese: 完美現在時 or Wan Mei Xian Zai Shi) is a 2019 documentary film entirely composed of livestream footage recorded from Chinese streaming sites. It was directed and edited by Shengze Zhu. Over the course of ten months, she edited 800 hours of footage into a two-hour montage. The film won the Hivos Tiger Award at the 2019 International Film Festival Rotterdam, where it had its world premiere.
