= Karen Cho =

Asian-Canadian documentary filmmaker

Karen Cho is a Chinese-Canadian documentary filmmaker based in Montreal, Quebec. Her socio-political films focus on Chinese-Canadian history, feminism, refugee rights, and the fight against gentrification of Chinatowns across North America. Her credits include the 2004 National Film Board of Canada (NFB) documentary In The Shadow Of Gold Mountain, documenting the effects of the Chinese Exclusion Act in Canada; the 2009 InformAction documentary Seeking Refuge; and the 2012 NFB documentary Status Quo? The Unfinished Business of Feminism in Canada, which was named best documentary at the Whistler Film Festival. Many of her films are political, featuring themes such as feminism and racism.

== Early life and education ==
Karen Cho is an anglophone fifth-generation Chinese Canadian. Her mother is British-Irish, and her father is Chinese-Canadian. She grew up in Montreal and graduated from Concordia University’s Mel Hoppenheim School of Cinema. Her 2001 graduate short film EVE won Best Cinematography at the NYC Flicker Film Festival, as reported by film industry sources covering the festival.

After immigrating to Canada from China over a century ago, Cho’s father’s family came to the Chinatowns of Vancouver and Montreal. While Cho herself did not live amongst these communities in her youth, she connected with them through her grandmother, who would take her on trips to the Montreal and Vancouver Chinatowns.

== Personal life ==
The progressive political views of Cho's films can also be seen in her personal life. For instance, it was through her research for her documentary Status Quo? that Cho decided to redefine herself as a feminist. Cho has also been involved in activism outside of her filmmaking. By participating in a working group against the urban development of Montreal's Chinatown, she advocated for preserving Montreal's Chinatown's cultural and historical significance, as well as the importance of not displacing its community members. In 2022, this work contributed to pressuring the Quebec provincial government to grant heritage status for two culturally relevant buildings, thus protecting them from demolition. Cho also expresses the importance of preserving Chinatowns in her documentary Big Fight in Little Chinatown.

== Career ==
Cho’s debut feature film, In the Shadow of Gold Mountain (2004, National Film Board of Canada), documented the Chinese Head Tax and Exclusion Act through interviews with survivors. Her follow-up film, Seeking Refuge (2009), followed five asylum seekers in Canada and was recognized with a Gemini Award nomination for Best Documentary. Status Quo? The Unfinished Business of Feminism in Canada (2012, NFB) won Best Documentary at the 2012 Whistler Film Festival. Her latest film Big Fight in Little Chinatown (2023, EyeSteelFilm) premiered at Hot Docs and DOC NYC, winning the Women Inmates’ Jury Award and People’s Choice Award at the Rencontres internationales du documentaire de Montréal (RIDM) in 2022.

After graduating from the Mel Hoppenheim School of Cinema, Cho made her first documentary, In The Shadow Of Gold Mountain (2004) at the National Film Board of Canada via a program for emerging filmmakers of colour. Her film visits the Chinatowns of Vancouver and Montreal to explore the history and impact of Canada’s Chinese Head Tax and Chinese Exclusion Act. It features interviews with Chinese-Canadians who experienced the passing of the discriminatory laws firsthand, while also showing how Chinese-Canadians continue to feel these impacts in present times.

Cho's second documentary, Seeking Refuge (2009), explores the experiences of five people seeking asylum in Canada, and was produced by Ian Olivieri, a fellow graduate of Mel Hoppenheim School of Cinema. Olivieri had previously been Cho's peer and was familiar with working with her, as they had collaborated on coursework many times.

Cho's most recent documentary, Big Fight in Little Chinatown (2023), highlights the cultural, economical and social significance of North American Chinatown communities. It explores the issues that they face as a result of gentrification and racism, and how they confront them. It explores Chinatowns in cities such as New York City, Vancouver, Los Angeles and Winnipeg, but its primary focus is on Chinatown in Montreal, Quebec. This film premiered on July 3, and was on a North American screening tour as of August 10, 2023, with most screenings airing in Chinatowns. The Vancouver and Montreal Chinatowns featured in this documentary were key settings and communities in Cho’s earlier film, In the Shadow of Gold Mountain.

== Style and themes ==
Cho’s work is known for its intimate interview style, use of archival footage, and an activist filmmaking approach. Major themes throughout her filmography include anti-Asian racism, diaspora identity, intersectional feminism, and the preservation of urban ethnic communities against gentrification.

== Filmography ==
Year	Title	Role(s)	Notes
2001	EVE	Director, Writer	Graduate short film.
2004	In the Shadow of Gold Mountain	Director, Writer	Feature documentary; National Film Board of Canada.
2009	Seeking Refuge	Director	Feature documentary; Gemini Award nomination.
2012	Status Quo? The Unfinished Business of Feminism in Canada	Director	Feature documentary; National Film Board of Canada; won Best Documentary at Whistler Film Festival.
2023	Big Fight in Little Chinatown	Director	Feature documentary; premiered at Hot Docs & DOC NYC; won RIDM awards.

== Awards and nominations ==
- 2002 – NYC Flicker Film Festival – Best Cinematography (EVE)
- 2009 – Gemini Awards – Nomination for Best Documentary (Seeking Refuge)
- 2012 – Whistler Film Festival – Best Documentary (Status Quo? The Unfinished Business of Feminism in Canada)
- 2022 – RIDM – Women Inmates’ Jury Award & People’s Choice Award (Big Fight in Little Chinatown)
- 2024 – Chinatown Film Festival – Best Documentary (Big Fight in Little Chinatown)
