= Marie Davignon =

Canadian cinematographer and film director

Marie Davignon is a Canadian cinematographer and film director. She is most noted for her work on the 2020 film Beans, for which she received a Canadian Screen Award nomination for Best Cinematography at the 9th Canadian Screen Awards in 2021.

She was also previously a nominee for Best Cinematography in a Documentary at the 3rd Canadian Screen Awards in 2015, for her work on All That We Make (Fermières).

Her other cinematography credits have included the films Sashinka, Black Conflux, Niagara, Miss Boots (Mlle Bottine) and Montreal, My Beautiful (Montréal, ma belle).

Her debut short film as a director, Girlfriends (Amies), was released in 2018.
