= Among Mountains and Streams =

- French: Parmi les montagnes et les ruisseaux
- Directed by: Jean-François Lesage
- Written by: Jean-François Lesage
- Produced by: Jean-François Lesage
- Starring: Ma Jian; Meng Huang
- Cinematography: Étienne Roussy
- Edited by: Mathieu Bouchard-Malo; Ariane Pétel-Despots
- Production company: Les Films de l'autre
- Distributed by: Les Films du 3 mars
- Release date: November 24, 2024 (RIDM)
- Running time: 98 minutes
- Country: Canada
- Language: Mandarin

Among Mountains and Streams (French: Parmi les montagnes et les ruisseaux) is a Canadian documentary film, directed by Jean-François Lesage and released in 2024. The film centres on two Chinese dissidents living in exile, writer Ma Jian and painter Meng Huang, who discuss their art and political activism while on a nature walk in rural Quebec.

The film premiered at the Montreal International Documentary Festival in November 2024, before going into commercial release 1n August 2025.

== Accolades ==
Award	Date of ceremony	Category	Recipient	Result	Ref.
Quebec Cinema Awards	2025	Best Documentary	Jean-François Lesage	Nominated	
Quebec Cinema Awards	2025	Best Cinematography in a Documentary	Étienne Roussy	Nominated	
