= Eve and the Fire Horse =

- Film poster
- Directed by: Julia Kwan
- Written by: Julia Kwan
- Produced by: Yves J. Ma; Erik Paulsson; Shan Tam
- Starring: Phoebe Jojo Kut; Hollie Lo; Vivian Wu; Lester Chit-Man Chan
- Cinematography: Nicolas Bolduc
- Edited by: Michael Brockington
- Music by: Mychael Danna; Rob Simonsen
- Distributed by: Mongrel Media
- Release dates: September 9, 2005 (Toronto); January 27, 2006 (Canada)
- Running time: 92 minutes
- Country: Canada
- Languages: English; Cantonese
- Budget: $1.5 million

Eve and the Fire Horse is a 2005 Canadian film written and directed by Julia Kwan. It won the Special Jury Prize at the Sundance Film Festival and the Claude Jutra Award for the best feature film by a first-time film director in Canada.

== Plot ==
Eve, a precocious nine-year-old with an overactive imagination, was born in the Year of the Fire Horse, notorious among Chinese families for producing the most troublesome children. Dinners around Eve's family table are a raucous affair, where old world propriety and new world audacity mix in even measure. But as summer approaches, it seems like Eve's carefree childhood days are behind her.

When her mother chops down their apple tree — a superstitious omen — bad luck worms its way into their family in unexpected, tragic ways. Forced to grow up too fast, Eve learns to take pleasure in life's small gifts — like a goldfish she believes to be the reincarnated spirit of her beloved grandmother.

Meanwhile, Eve's older sister Karena is going through changes of her own, exploring a newfound fascination with Christianity. Soon, crucifixes pop up next to the Buddha in the family's house, and Eve must contend with a Sunday school class where her wild imagination is distinctly out of place.

Caught between her sister's quest for premature sainthood and her own sense of right and wrong, Eve faces the challenges of childhood with fanciful humor and wide-eyed wonder. Along the way, she proves that sometimes the most troublesome children are the ones that touch our hearts most deeply.

== Cast ==
- Phoebe Jojo Kut as Eve Eng
- Hollie Lo as Karena Eng
- Vivian Wu as May Lin Eng
- Lester Chit-Man Chan as Frank
- Ping Sun Wong as Grandma
- Joseph Siu Kin Hing as Uncle #8
- Shirley Ng as Auntie #8
- Diane Buermans as Cousin Colleen
- Franco Maravilla as Cousin Edward
- Jessica Amlee as Sally
- Pawan Gill as Surinder
- Wendy Russell as Sister Agnes
- Julia Tortolano as Becky
- Matias Hacker as Karena's Teacher
- Chris Shields as Fred
- Todd McGowan as Jeff
- Jennifer Cheon as Goddess
- Gary Young as Jesus
- Francis Mah as Buddha
- Alan Cedargreen as Priest
- Herb Beaverstone as Mr. Wicker
- Jan Bos as Mr. Parker
- Tanya Champoux as Mrs. Leeds
- Alexus Dumont as Amanda
- Alexander Ludwig as Kevin
- Keanu Pires as Tony
