= Big Fight in Little Chinatown =

- Directed by: Karen Cho
- Release date: 2022

Big Fight In Little Chinatown is a 2022 documentary film about the Chinatowns in New York City, Vancouver, and Montreal and the threats they face. The film was directed by Karen Cho.
