= Field Niggas =

- Promotional release poster
- Directed by: Khalik Allah
- Cinematography: Khalik Allah
- Edited by: Khalik Allah
- Release date: February 2015
- Running time: 60 minutes
- Country: United States
- Languages: English; Spanish

Field Niggas is a 2015 American documentary film directed and edited by Khalik Allah. The film comprises observational footage of, and interviews and discussions with, people at night around the notorious Harlem street corner of 125th Street and Lexington Avenue in New York City. Its subjects are predominantly African American, experiencing poverty, homelessness, drug addiction, physical infirmities, and harassment from the police.

== Production ==
Field Niggas was filmed during the summer of 2014, shot using a handheld camera and available lighting. Khalik Allah served as director, cinematographer, and editor. He recorded the sound of his conversations with people separately to filming them, so the sound is not synchronised with the images. The film also includes surveillance footage of the strangulation of Eric Garner as well as the overdubbed sound of field hollers by a 1950s chain gang.

The film's title is derived from "Message to the Grass Roots", a public speech delivered by human rights activist Malcolm X in 1963, "extolling the spirit of rebellion among outdoor slaves."

== Release and reception ==
Allah released the film for free on YouTube and Vimeo in 2015 for a short time, before removing it at the request of True/False Film Festival so it could be shown there. It has since been shown on the film festival and college circuits in the United States and Europe.

Glenn Kenny of The New York Times called the film "powerful", and wrote that it "is so beautifully constructed that nothing in it ever seems obvious." Jordan Hoffman of The Guardian gave the film four out of five stars, calling it "gorgeous and achingly sad". Alan Scherstuhl of The Village Voice wrote: "More a woozy experience you press through than an ethnographic study you watch, Khalik Allah's hour-long non-narrative street-life doc Field Niggas stands as the most striking sort of urban portraiture." Charlie Schmidlin of IndieWire wrote: "Intimate, singular, and hallucinatory on all aesthetic levels, the film strips politics down to the bone, not always successful but never opportunistic."

Neil Young of The Hollywood Reporter called the film "an hour-long Harlem nocturne of near-hallucinatory intensity", but wrote that "the project is ultimately hobbled by repetitiveness and directorial self-regard."
