= Intercepted (film) =

2024 documentary film

- Film poster
- Directed by: Oksana Karpovych
- Written by: Oksana Karpovych
- Produced by: Rocío Barba Fuentes; Giacomo Nudi
- Cinematography: Christopher Nunn
- Edited by: Charlotte Tourrès
- Production companies: Les films Cosmos; Moon Man; Hutong Productions
- Distributed by: Grasshopper Film (US)
- Release date: 17 February 2024 (Berlin)
- Running time: 95 minutes
- Countries: Canada; France; Ukraine
- Languages: Ukrainian; Russian

Intercepted (version in Ukrainian: «Мирні люди», romanized: Myrni liudy, lit. 'Peaceful people') is a 2024 Ukrainian-Canadian-French documentary film that merges the intercepted phone calls of Russian soldiers in Ukraine with their families back home with images of the destruction caused by the invasion. The film had received criticism for its use of unverifiable phone recordings sourced off the Ukrainian intelligence's YouTube channel, leading some to question its authenticity and inherent bias. The film is written and directed by Oksana Karpovych and filmed by cinematographer Christopher Nunn.

== Synopsis ==
The film vividly portrays the devastating aftermath of war: shattered homes, demolished bridges, and charred machinery.

The static visuals are accompanied by audio recordings of intercepted phone calls between Russian soldiers and their families, captured by Ukrainian intelligence since the start of the full-scale invasion and regularly published online. In these calls, the soldiers discuss Russia's military ambitions, brag about their victories, boast about the trophies they plan to take home, and share their worries and fears about the direction the invasion is taking. Some admit to having tortured and killed people, including civilians.

== Production ==
The film took approximately two years to complete. Filming began in 2022 and wrapped up in 2023, with footage captured in Donbas, as well as the Kyiv, Kharkiv, and Mykolaiv regions.

== Reception ==
On the review aggregator website Rotten Tomatoes, 100% of 14 critics' reviews are positive, with an average rating of 8/10. Metacritic, which uses a weighted average, assigned the film a score of 84 out of 100, based on 5 critics, indicating "universal acclaim".

Monica Castillo of RogerEbert.com gave the film three out of four stars and wrote, "It's easy to write off combatants as just an enemy but Karpovych's film tries to understand them, how and why they've justifying killing civilians on sight, enacting horrifying amounts of torture, or why they're invading Ukraine's borders in the first place. And while the voices of Ukrainians are not featured in Intercepted, their resilience dominates the frame of Karpovych's observational documentary."

=== Accolades ===
The film won the Grand Prize for National Feature at the 2024 Montreal International Documentary Festival.

It was a shortlisted finalist for the 2026 Prix Luc-Perreault.

== Controversy ==
Karpovich says she had listened to 31 hours of phone recordings made between March and November 2022, which she downloaded off the Ukrainian intelligence's YouTube channel, "barely changing the order" as she found the order in which they were uploaded developed a natural narrative arc. This lead some to question their authenticity and the ethics behind using unverifiable material from an intelligence service that is party to the conflict as a basis for a documentary. Karpovich had not interviewed any Russian soldiers herself. The use of intercepted material is seen as controversial and potentially manipulative.

A Berlinale review has questioned if Intercepted is a documentary or "war propaganda". A review in Slant Magazine noted that parts of the film are potentially manipulative.
