= Julia Kwan =

Canadian film director

Julia Kwan is a Canadian screenwriter, director, and occasional producer of her own short and feature films. She has brought a keen sense of the Chinese-Canadian cultural experience to her films. Several of the films were made in conjunction with the National Film Board of Canada. Her feature films include Eve and the Fire Horse (2005), as well as the feature length documentary film Everything Will Be (2014). She is also known for her short film 10,000 Delusions (1999) which screened at the Vancouver International Film Festival.

== Early life ==
Julia Kwan was raised in Vancouver, British Columbia to Chinese immigrant parents. These childhood experiences would be a strong influence on her feature film Eve and the Fire Horse. Her mother was a garment factory worker, while her father was employed as the head waiter at a Vancouver Chinese restaurant. She studied film at Ryerson Polytechnic University in Toronto, Ontario. Kwan was previously employed as a data entry clerk, and is capable of typing 105 words a minute. As of 2006, Kwan is in remission from cancer. Kwan was born under the Chinese astrological sign of the Fire Horse. Kwan did not start making films until her 20s.

== Career ==
Julia Kwan was a director resident at Norman Jewison's Canadian Film Centre. After beginning her career writing and directing two short films, she made her feature Eve and the Fire Horse (2005). The film was well received, with Variety Magazine declaring it "a finely wrought period piece" and "an exceptional feature debut." Forty percent of the dialogue in Eve and the Fire Horse (2005) is spoken in Kwan's native tongue of Cantonese. The film deals with the issues that arise from the friction between traditional Buddhist beliefs and those of Catholicism for nine year old Eve (Phoebe Kut) growing up in Vancouver. The actress has appeared in three of Kwan's films. The film is "a largely autobiographical tale (of Kwan herself) growing up as a child of immigrants in Vancouver."

She has worked in a diversity of both subjects and genres throughout her filmography. Her short film Surfacing (2015) had Canadian folk musician Sarah McLachlan for a subject. In the film, McLachlan tells anecdotes from both her childhood and professional career, in first person narration. Kwan also made a foray into animation with her short film Blossom (2010). This short experimental film showcases the changing of the seasons, as compared with the growth cycle of a child. Kwan's feature film Everything Will Be (2014) was her exploration of the effects of gentrification in Vancouver Chinatown. In the film, she interviews neighbourhood occupants that represent both the past and the future of the rapidly gentrifying community. The title of the film was inspired by an artistic installation by Martin Creed. As of late 2006, Kwan was writing a treatment of Douglas Coupland's classic novel Generation X.

== Filmography ==
Year	Title	Role
1999	10,000 Delusions	Writer, director
2001	Three Sisters On Moon Lake	Writer, director
2005	Eve and the Fire Horse	Writer, director, Associate Producer
2007	Smile	Writer, director, producer
2010	Blossom	Writer, director
2014	Everything Will Be	Writer, director
2015	Surfacing	Writer, director

== Awards and nominations ==
Kwan won several awards for her feature Eve and the Fire Horse. She shared the Claude Jutra Award at the 2006 Genie Awards for that film with filmmaker Stephane Lapointe. He won for his film The Secret Life of Happy People. She also won a Special Jury Prize at the 2006 Sundance Film Festival for Eve and the Fire Horse. At the 2006 Leo Awards, she won awards for Best Direction and Screenwriting for Eve and the Fire Horse. She won the 2001 Charles Israel Screenwriting Prize for the screenplay for Eve and the Fire Horse from the Writers Guild of Canada. In 2005, Kwan won the Best Canadian Film Award for Eve and the Fire Horse at the Vancouver International Film Festival.
