= Khalik Allah =

American filmmaker and photographer

- Born: 1985; Brookhaven, New York, U.S.
- Citizenship: American; Jamaican
- Occupations: Filmmaker, photographer
- Years active: 2010–present
- Notable work: Field Niggas (2015); Souls Against the Concrete (2017); Black Mother (2018)
- Website: www.khalikallah.com

Khalik Allah (born 1985) is an American filmmaker and photographer. His 2015 documentary film Field Niggas and his 2017 book Souls Against the Concrete depict people who inhabit the notorious Harlem corner of 125th Street and Lexington Avenue in New York City. His film Black Mother (2018) depicts people on the island of Jamaica. "He favours visual portraits of people on the street – filming their faces for several seconds as they pose as if for a still camera." Khalik lives on Long Island and is a Nominee member of Magnum Photos.

== Life and work ==
Khalik was born in Brookhaven, New York. His mother is Jamaican and his father is Iranian. He grew up in Suffolk County on Long Island, New York, but moved between Queens and Harlem throughout his childhood. His parents met at university in Bristol, England. He is a dual Jamaican-American citizen.

He started making movies at age 19 with a Hi-8 video camera. His first feature film, Popa Wu: A 5% Story (2010), was a "normal, talking heads documentary" about Popa Wu, "Wu-Tang Clan's de facto spiritual advisor" and a member of Five-Percent Nation. It took four years to make. Khalik took up still photography in 2010.

In June 2020 he became a Nominee member of Magnum Photos.

Khalik is a Five Percenter.

=== Field Niggas ===
Described by The Village Voice as "more a woozy experience you press through than an ethnographic study you watch, Khalik Allah's hour-long non-narrative street-life doc Field Niggas stands as the most striking sort of urban portraiture." The film comprises observational footage of, and interviews and discussions with, people at night around the notorious Harlem street corner of 125th Street and Lexington Avenue in New York City. Its subjects are predominantly African American, experiencing poverty, homelessness, drug addiction, and harassment from the police; people with "a hunger to have their voices heard". The police are also portrayed.

The film's title is taken from "Message to the Grass Roots", a public speech delivered by human rights activist Malcolm X in 1963, "extolling the spirit of rebellion among outdoor slaves." The film was made in summer 2014, filmed using a handheld camera. Apart from the cinematography, it includes surveillance footage of the strangulation of Eric Garner as well as the overdubbed sound of field hollers by a 1950s chain gang.

Khalik released the film for free on YouTube and Vimeo in 2015 for a short time, before removing it at the request of True/False Film Festival so it could show there. It has since been shown on the film festival and college circuits in the US and Europe.

=== Souls Against the Concrete ===
Souls Against the Concrete consists of Khalik's photographs of people at night around the intersection of 125th Street and Lexington Avenue in New York City, between 2012 and 2016.

Khalik used slow-speed color film, usually intended for daylight photography, for its high contrast, with a 35 mm SLR camera from 1971. Because of photographing at night using available light, he used a fast manual focus normal lens at a large aperture (hence the shallow depth of field). (Note: Khalik used Kodak Portra 160 colour film, with a Nikon F2 35 mm SLR camera and a Nikon 55 mm f/1.2 lens, at f/1.2, manually focused. He has also used Canon AE-1 and Canon A-1 SLR cameras and Contax T2 and Yashica T4 compact cameras.)

=== Black Mother ===
Black Mother was made in Jamaica, its subjects are holy men, sex workers, beggars, hawkers and children. It was made in the same fashion as Field Niggas: "visual portraits of people on the street – filming their faces for several seconds as they pose as if for a still camera" – with a soundtrack out of synch with the images.

Khalik used a Panasonic Lumix DMC-GH3 digital camera, and Super 8, Super 16 and Bolex film cameras.

== Publications ==
- Souls Against the Concrete. Austin: University of Texas, 2017. ISBN 978-1-4773-1314-5.

== Films ==
=== Documentary films ===
- Popa Wu: A 5% Story (2010) – 1 hr
- Antonyms of Beauty (2013) – 27 mins
- Field Niggas (2015) – 1 hr
- Black Mother (2018) – 1 hr 17 mins
- IWOW: I Walk On Water (2020) – 3 hrs 20 mins

=== Short films ===
- Urban Rashomon
- Khamaica

=== Music videos ===
- The Razah Code Underground Hip-Hop Chapter 1

=== Films with contributions by Khalik ===
- Lemonade (2016) – 46 mins, about Beyoncé, produced by Good Company and Jonathan Lia, premiered on HBO – Khalik was second unit director and cinematographer

== See also ==
- I'm Waiting for the Man
