= Zhengfan Yang =

Filmmaker

- 楊正帆
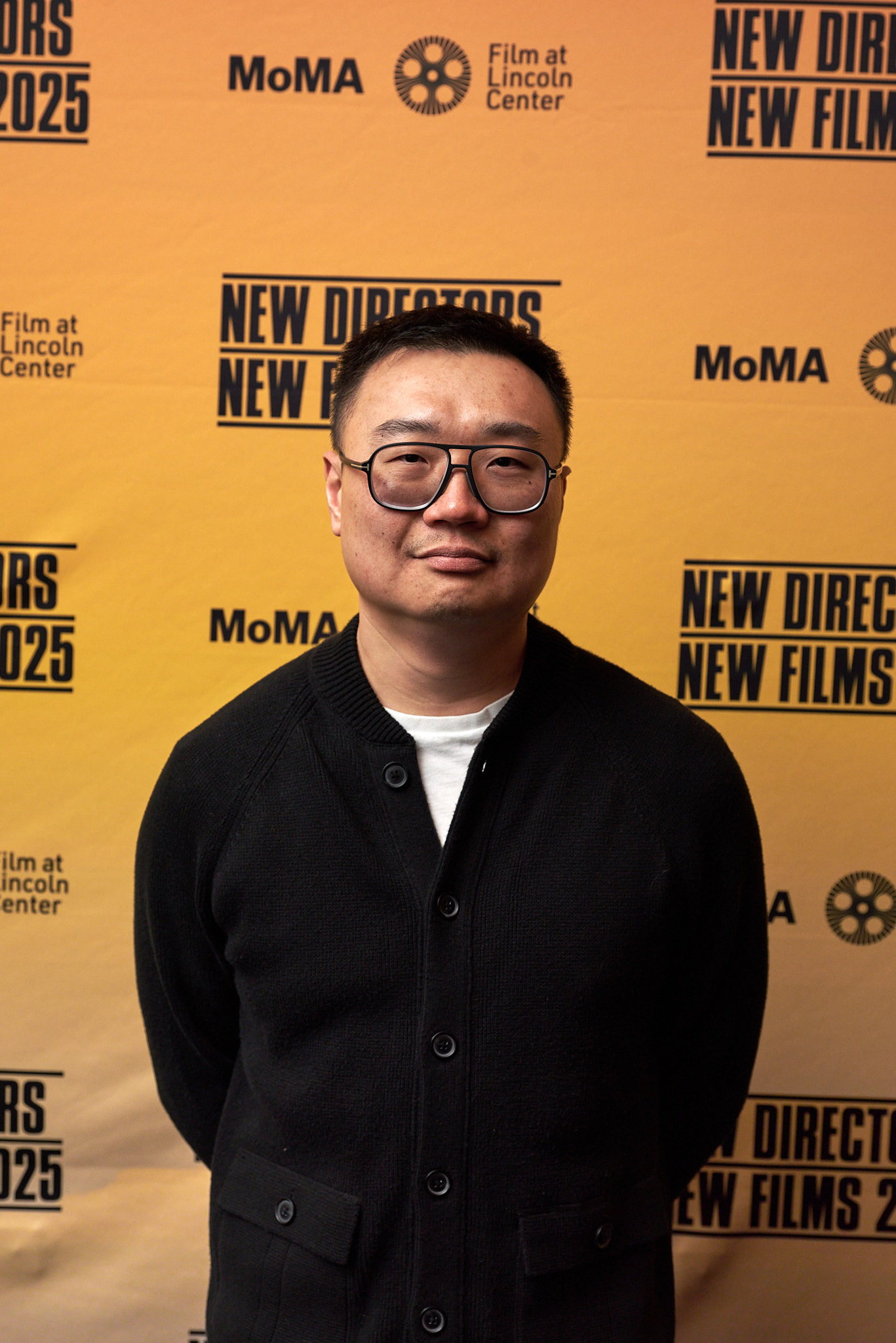
- Yang at the 2025 New Directors/New Films Festival
- Born: 1985 (age 40–41); China
- Occupations: Film writer, director, producer
- Years active: 2010–present
- Notable work: Distant, Where Are You Going, Down There, Footnote, Stranger

Zhengfan Yang (born 1985) is a filmmaker and visual artist. Originally from China, he has been based in the United States since 2015. He is known for works that explore space, time, and displacement through long takes and in both an observational and a sensory style. His films have been screened internationally at festivals including the Venice Film Festival, Festival del Film Locarno, New York Film Festival, International Film Festival Rotterdam, Karlovy Vary International Film Festival, and Busan International Film Festival.

== Early life and career ==
After graduated from law school, Yang turned to filmmaking in his early twenties. In 2010, he co-founded the production collective Burn The Film with filmmaker Shengze Zhu, focusing on independent and artistically driven film projects. As a producer, Yang has produced Zhu's films including Out of Focus (2014), Another Year (2016), Present. Perfect. (2019), and A River Runs, Turns, Erases, Replaces (2021), which received awards at international festivals. His own directorial work has been presented at major festivals and has been discussed within the context of "slow cinema" and transcendental style.

== Notable works ==
=== Distant (2013) ===
Yang's debut feature Distant (Yuan Fang) consists of 13 long, static shots observing anonymous figures in various urban and rural spaces in southern China. With no dialogue or conventional narrative, this experimental film examines distance—both physical and emotional—against the backdrop of modernization. It premiered in the Filmmakers of the Present competition at the Festival del Film Locarno.

=== Where Are You Going (2016) ===
Where Are You Going is a documentary filmed entirely inside a Hong Kong taxi, composed of 13 rides that unfold through off-screen conversations between driver and passengers. The film reflects on urban space, identity, and social tensions in contemporary Hong Kong. It premiered at the International Film Festival Rotterdam and won the Jury Award at the China Independent Film Festival.

=== Down There (2018) ===
Down There reenacts a violent event that disturbs the mundane quietness of the night. Through minimal dialogue and carefully composed mise-en-scene, the film depicts how people react to unseen events. It premiered in the Orizzonti section of the 75th Venice International Film Festival and was later shown at the New York Film Festival and Busan International Film Festival.

=== Footnote (2022) ===
Set in Chicago during the COVID-19 pandemic, Footnote presents static, exterior shots of the city accompanied by live police radio transmissions. The film juxtaposes still urban imagery with disembodied voices to form an indirect chronicle of recent social unrest. It premiered at the International Film Festival Rotterdam and later screened at Viennale and Arts of the Real at Lincoln Center.

=== Stranger (2024) ===
His most renowned film, Stranger (Ju Wai Ren) is an anthology feature composed of seven vignettes set in hotel rooms across different countries. Each episode portrays moments of transition, solitude, or estrangement. Drawing on the anthropological concept of the "non-place," the film uses transient spaces to explore the tension between belonging and anonymity.

The film premiered at the Karlovy Vary International Film Festival in 2024, where it received the Proxima Grand Prix, and later screened at New Directors/New Films (MoMA & Film at Lincoln Center). Reviews from Cineuropa, Le Polyester, and Quinlan described Stranger as a formally precise work concerned with spatial and emotional confinement.

Film at Lincoln Center described the film as "an actor's showcase and a study in narrative delineation," and Yang as "as one of China’s most exciting up-and-coming cinematic talents", while Film International highlighted its "movement from the real to the surreal" and its inquiry into the human condition.

== Awards and honors ==
- Proxima Grand Prix, Karlovy Vary International Film Festival (2024) – Stranger.
- Jury Award, China Independent Film Festival (2016) – Where Are You Going.

== Style and reception ==
Yang's films have been discussed in relation to "slow cinema" and "transcendental style" for their emphasis on cinematic duration, mundane happenings, and psychological distance. Critics have noted his use of long takes, static compositions, and off-screen sound to evoke modern alienation and social transition. His practice bridges fiction and documentary, focusing on contemporary conditions of mobility, isolation, and global movement.

== Selected filmography ==
Title	Original title	Year	Genre	Role
Distant	Yuan Fang / 遠方	2013	Fiction	Director, Writer
Where Are You Going	Ni Wang He Chu Qu / 你往何處去	2016	Documentary	Director
Down There	Na Li / 那裡	2018	Fiction	Director, Writer
Footnote		2022	Documentary	Director
Stranger	Ju Wai Ren / 局外人	2024	Fiction	Director, Writer
