= 6th Jutra Awards =

2004 Canadian film awards ceremony

The 6th Jutra Awards were held on February 22, 2004 to honour films made with the participation of the Quebec film industry in 2003.

The ceremony marked the first time that three films received ten nominations or more. Seducing Doctor Lewis (La grande séduction) lead with thirteen nominations, a new record, and won a leading six competitive awards and the Billet d'or. It became the fifth movie to win two acting awards, and the first to win both Best Supporting Actor, for Pierre Collin, and Best Supporting Actress, for Clémence DesRochers.

Academy Award winner The Barbarian Invasions (Les invasions barbares) received twelve nominations, and won five competitive awards including Best Film, Best Director and Best Screenplay, as well as the Most Successful Film Outside Quebec award. It also became the third film to receive at least one nomination in every acting category. Marie-Josée Croze received her second Best Actress award, having previously won for Maelström. It was the third film to receive nominations in the "Big Five" categories, only losing Best Actor for Rémy Girard.

Gaz Bar Blues received ten nominations and won two awards, including Best Actor for Serge Thériault.

Jean-Claude Labrecque and Benoît Pilon tied for Best Documentary, for À Hauteur d'homme and Roger Toupin, épicier variété respectively, the second tie in the history of the awards.

== Winners and nominees ==
Best Film	Best Director
The Barbarian Invasions (Les invasions barbares) — Denise Robert, Daniel Louis; Far Side of the Moon (La face cachée de la lune) — Bob Krupinski, Mario St-Laurent; Gaz Bar Blues — Lorraine Dufour; Seducing Doctor Lewis (La grande séduction) — Roger Frappier, Luc Vandal	Denys Arcand, The Barbarian Invasions (Les invasions barbares); Louis Bélanger, Gaz Bar Blues; Bernard Émond, 8:17 p.m. Darling Street (20h17 rue Darling); Jean-François Pouliot, Seducing Doctor Lewis (La grande séduction)
Best Actor	Best Actress
Serge Thériault, Gaz Bar Blues; Raymond Bouchard, Seducing Doctor Lewis (La grande séduction); Rémy Girard, The Barbarian Invasions (Les invasions barbares); Luc Picard, 8:17 p.m. Darling Street (20h17 rue Darling)	Marie-Josée Croze, The Barbarian Invasions (Les invasions barbares); Sylvie Drapeau, Juniper Tree (Le piège d'Issoudun); Micheline Lanctôt, How My Mother Gave Birth to Me During Menopause (Comment ma mère accoucha de moi durant sa ménopause); Ginette Reno, Mambo Italiano
Best Supporting Actor	Best Supporting Actress
Pierre Collin, Seducing Doctor Lewis (La grande séduction); Benoît Brière, Seducing Doctor Lewis (La grande séduction); Pierre Curzi, The Barbarian Invasions (Les invasions barbares); Sébastien Delorme, Gaz Bar Blues	Clémence DesRochers, Seducing Doctor Lewis (La grande séduction); Dorothée Berryman, The Barbarian Invasions (Les invasions barbares); Claudia Ferri, Mambo Italiano; Guylaine Tremblay, 8:17 p.m. Darling Street (20h17 rue Darling)
Best Screenplay	Best Documentary
Denys Arcand, The Barbarian Invasions (Les invasions barbares); Louis Bélanger, Gaz Bar Blues; Bernard Émond, 8:17 p.m. Darling Street (20h17 rue Darling); Ken Scott, Seducing Doctor Lewis (La grande séduction)	Jean-Claude Labrecque, À Hauteur d'homme; Benoît Pilon, Roger Toupin, épicier variété; Pascale Ferland, Something Like Immortality (L'immortalité en fin de compte); Donald McWilliams, The Fifth Province (La Cinquième Province)
Best Live Short	Best Animated Short
Stefan Miljevic, Mammouth; Simon Lavoie, Corps étrangers; Tomi Grgicevic, Bager; Nicolas Roy, Léo	Masoud Raouf, Blue Like a Gunshot (Bleu comme un coup de feu); Nicolas Brault, Islet (Îlot); Félix Dufour-Laperrière, Black Ink on Blue Sky (Encre noire sur fond d'azur); Steven Woloshen, Two Eastern Hair Lines
Best Art Direction	Best Cinematography
Normand Sarazin, The Barbarian Invasions (Les invasions barbares); Patricia Christie, Mambo Italiano; Jean Le Bourdais, The Far Side of the Moon (La face cachée de la lune); Normand Sarazin, Seducing Doctor Lewis (La grande séduction)	Allen Smith, Seducing Doctor Lewis (La grande séduction); Guy Dufaux, The Barbarian Invasions (Les invasions barbares); Jean-Pierre St-Louis, Gaz Bar Blues; Nathalie Moliavko-Visotzky, Ma voisine danse le ska
Best Costume Design	Best Editing
Louise Gagné, Seducing Doctor Lewis (La grande séduction); Francesca Chamberland, Mambo Italiano; Brigitte Desroches, Immortals (Les immortels); Sophie Lefebvre, Gaz Bar Blues	Dominique Fortin, Seducing Doctor Lewis (La grande séduction); Louise Côté, 8:17 p.m. Darling Street (20h17 rue Darling); Isabelle Dedieu, The Barbarian Invasions (Les invasions barbares); Lorraine Dufour, Gaz Bar Blues
Best Makeup	Best Original Music
Brigitte Bilodeau, The Far Side of the Moon (La face cachée de la lune); Claudette Beaudoin-Casavant, Red Nose (Nez rouge); Evelyne Byot and Diane Simard, The Barbarian Invasions (Les invasions barbares); Kathryn Casault, 8:17 p.m. Darling Street (20h17 rue Darling)	Guy Bélanger and Claude Fradette, Gaz Bar Blues; Jean-Marie Benoît, Seducing Doctor Lewis (La grande séduction); FM Le Sieur, Mambo Italiano; Michel Cusson, Father and Sons (Père et fils)
Best Sound	Special Awards
Claude Hazanavicius, Marcel Pothier and Michel Descombes, Seducing Doctor Lewis (La grande séduction); Patrick Rousseau, Michel Descombes, Gavin Fernandes and Marie-Claude Gagné, The Barbarian Invasions (Les invasions barbares); Gilles Corbeil, Hans Peter Strobl and Louis Collin, Gaz Bar Blues; Louis Hone, Evil Words (Sur le seuil)	Jutra Hommage: Richard Grégoire; Most Successful Film Outside Quebec: The Barbarian Invasions (Les invasions barbares); Billet d'or: Seducing Doctor Lewis (La grande séduction)

== Multiple wins and nominations ==
=== Films with multiple nominations ===
Nominations	Film
13	Seducing Doctor Lewis (La grande séduction)
12	The Barbarian Invasions (Les invasions barbares)
10	Gaz Bar Blues
6	8:17 p.m. Darling Street (20h17 rue Darling)
5	Mambo Italiano
3	Far Side of the Moon (La face cachée de la lune)

=== Films with multiple wins ===
Wins	Film
7	Seducing Doctor Lewis (La grande séduction)
6	The Barbarian Invasions (Les invasions barbares)
2	Gaz Bar Blues
