= Prix Iris for Best Editing =

Annual Canadian film award

The Prix Iris for Best Editing (French: Prix Iris du meilleur montage) is an annual film award presented by Québec Cinéma as part of the Prix Iris awards program, to honour the year's best film editing in the Cinema of Quebec.

Until 2016, it was known as the Jutra Award for Best Editing in memory of influential Quebec film director Claude Jutra. Following the withdrawal of Jutra's name from the award, the 2016 award was presented under the name Québec Cinéma. The Prix Iris name was announced in October 2016.

Richard Comeau received six awards from eight nominations, both records, including two consecutive awards in 2013 and 2014, and again in 2016 and 2017. Mathieu Bouchard-Malo is the only editor to receive two nominations in the same year in 2019.

To date, fourteen editors received nominations for films they directed: Michel Jetté, Simon Sauvé, Xavier Dolan (thrice), Demian Fuica, Rafaël Ouellet, Nathalie Saint-Pierre, François Delisle, Chloé Leriche, Mathieu Denis, Robin Aubert, Sophie Deraspe, Monia Chokri, Matthew Rankin and Chloé Robichaud. Of those, Xavier Dolan and Sophie Deraspe won the award.

== 1990s ==
Year	Editor	Film	Ref
1999; 1st Jutra Awards
1999; 1st Jutra Awards	Gaétan Huot	The Red Violin (Le Violon rouge)	
1999; 1st Jutra Awards	Richard Comeau	2 Seconds (2 secondes)	
1999; 1st Jutra Awards	Aube Foglia	Nô	
1999; 1st Jutra Awards	Sophie Leblond	August 32nd on Earth (Un 32 août sur terre)	

== 2000s ==
Year	Editor	Film	Ref
2000; 2nd Jutra Awards
2000; 2nd Jutra Awards	Lorraine Dufour	Post Mortem	
2000; 2nd Jutra Awards	Michel Arcand	Set Me Free (Emporte-moi)	
2000; 2nd Jutra Awards	André Corriveau	Winter Stories (Histoires d'hiver)	
2000; 2nd Jutra Awards	José Heppell	Pin-Pon: The Film (Pin-Pon, le film)	
2001; 3rd Jutra Awards
2001; 3rd Jutra Awards	Richard Comeau	Maelström	
2001; 3rd Jutra Awards	Hélène Girard	The Orphan Muses (Les Muses orphelines)	
2001; 3rd Jutra Awards	Michel Jetté, Louise Sabourin	Hochelaga	
2001; 3rd Jutra Awards	Sophie Leblond	The Left-Hand Side of the Fridge (La Moitié gauche du frigo)	
2002; 4th Jutra Awards
2002; 4th Jutra Awards	Sophie Leblond	Soft Shell Man (Un crabe dans la tête)	
2002; 4th Jutra Awards	Louise Côté	The Woman Who Drinks (La femme qui boit)	
2002; 4th Jutra Awards	Aube Foglia	Between the Moon and Montevideo	
2002; 4th Jutra Awards	Gaétan Huot	Karmina 2	
2003; 5th Jutra Awards
2003; 5th Jutra Awards	Lorraine Dufour	The Negro (Le nèg')	
2003; 5th Jutra Awards	Jean-François Bergeron	The Mysterious Miss C. (La Mystérieuse Mademoiselle C.)	
2003; 5th Jutra Awards	Hélène Girard	Karmen Geï	
2003; 5th Jutra Awards	Denis Papillon	The Baroness and the Pig	
2004; 6th Jutra Awards
2004; 6th Jutra Awards	Dominique Fortin	Seducing Doctor Lewis (La Grande séduction)	
2004; 6th Jutra Awards	Louise Côté	8:17 p.m. Darling Street (20h17 rue Darling)	
2004; 6th Jutra Awards	Isabelle Dedieu	The Barbarian Invasions (Les Invasions barbares)	
2004; 6th Jutra Awards	Lorraine Dufour	Gaz Bar Blues	
2005; 7th Jutra Awards
2005; 7th Jutra Awards	Glenn Berman	Looking for Alexander (Mémoires affectives)	
2005; 7th Jutra Awards	Jean-François Bergeron	The Last Tunnel (Le Dernier tunnel)	
2005; 7th Jutra Awards	Richard Comeau	The Five of Us (Elles étaient cinq)	
2005; 7th Jutra Awards	Hélène Girard	How to Conquer America in One Night (Comment conquérir l'Amérique en une nuit)	
2006; 8th Jutra Awards
2006; 8th Jutra Awards	Paul Jutras	C.R.A.Z.Y.	
2006; 8th Jutra Awards	Michel Arcand	The Rocket (Maurice Richard)	
2006; 8th Jutra Awards	Louise Côté	The Novena (La Neuvaine)	
2006; 8th Jutra Awards	Simon Sauvé	Jimmywork	
2007; 9th Jutra Awards
2007; 9th Jutra Awards	Jean-François Bergeron	Bon Cop, Bad Cop	
2007; 9th Jutra Awards	Hélène Girard	A Sunday in Kigali (Un dimanche à Kigali)	
2007; 9th Jutra Awards	Denis Papillon	Family History (Histoire de famille)	
2007; 9th Jutra Awards	Arthur Tarnowski	Duo	
2008; 10th Jutra Awards
2008; 10th Jutra Awards	Éric Drouin	Nitro	
2008; 10th Jutra Awards	Michel Arcand and Louis Martin-Paradis	Shake Hands with the Devil	
2008; 10th Jutra Awards	Louise Côté	Summit Circle (Contre toute espérance)	
2008; 10th Jutra Awards	Sophie Leblond	Continental, a Film Without Guns (Continental, un film sans fusil)	
2009; 11th Jutra Awards
2009; 11th Jutra Awards	Yvann Thibaudeau	Borderline	
2009; 11th Jutra Awards	Glenn Berman	A No-Hit No-Run Summer (Un été sans point ni coup sûr)	
2009; 11th Jutra Awards	Carina Baccanale, Dominique Fortin	Le Banquet	
2009; 11th Jutra Awards	Isabelle Malenfant	A Sentimental Capitalism (Un capitalisme sentimental)	

== 2010s ==
Year	Editor	Film	Ref
2010; 12th Jutra Awards
2010; 12th Jutra Awards	Richard Comeau	Polytechnique	
2010; 12th Jutra Awards	Michel Arcand	Love and Savagery	
2010; 12th Jutra Awards	Glenn Berman	Angel at Sea (Un ange à la mer)	
2010; 12th Jutra Awards	Michel Grou	The Master Key (Grande Ourse, la clé des possibles)	
2010; 12th Jutra Awards	Linda Pinet	Je me souviens	
2011; 13th Jutra Awards
2011; 13th Jutra Awards	Monique Dartonne	Incendies	
2011; 13th Jutra Awards	Michel Arcand	The Last Escape (La Dernière Fugue)	
2011; 13th Jutra Awards	Carina Baccanale	Crying Out (À l'origine d'un cri)	
2011; 13th Jutra Awards	Xavier Dolan	Heartbeats (Les amours imaginaires)	
2011; 13th Jutra Awards	Valérie Héroux	7 Days (Les 7 Jours du Talion)	
2012; 14th Jutra Awards
2012; 14th Jutra Awards	Elisabeth Olga Tremblay	Snow & Ashes	
2012; 14th Jutra Awards	Jean-François Bergeron	A Sense of Humour (Le Sens de l'humour)	
2012; 14th Jutra Awards	Demian Fuica	La Run	
2012; 14th Jutra Awards	Éric Génois	On the Beat (Sur le rythme)	
2012; 14th Jutra Awards	Geoffroy Lauzon, Louise Sabourin	BumRush	
2013; 15th Jutra Awards
2013; 15th Jutra Awards	Richard Comeau	War Witch (Rebelle)	
2013; 15th Jutra Awards	Hélène Girard	Beyond the Walls (Hors les murs)	
2013; 15th Jutra Awards	Hubert Hayaud	Romeo Eleven (Roméo Onze)	
2013; 15th Jutra Awards	Sophie Leblond	Inch'Allah	
2013; 15th Jutra Awards	Rafaël Ouellet	Camion	
2014; 16th Jutra Awards
2014; 16th Jutra Awards	Richard Comeau	Gabrielle	
2014; 16th Jutra Awards	Dominique Fortin	Erased	
2014; 16th Jutra Awards	Louis-Martin Paradis	Another House (L'Autre Maison)	
2014; 16th Jutra Awards	Nathalie Saint-Pierre	Catimini	
2014; 16th Jutra Awards	Arthur Tarnowski	Whitewash	
2015; 17th Jutra Awards
2015; 17th Jutra Awards	Xavier Dolan	Mommy	
2015; 17th Jutra Awards	Glenn Berman	Uvanga	
2015; 17th Jutra Awards	Michel Giroux	3 Indian Tales (3 histoires d'Indiens)	
2015; 17th Jutra Awards	Louis-Philippe Rathé	The Little Queen (La petite reine)	
2015; 17th Jutra Awards	Yvann Thibaudeau	1987	
2016; 18th Quebec Cinema Awards
2016; 18th Quebec Cinema Awards	Richard Comeau	My Internship in Canada (Guibord s'en va-t-en guerre)	
2016; 18th Quebec Cinema Awards	Mathieu Bouchard-Malo	Our Loved Ones (Les êtres chers)	
2016; 18th Quebec Cinema Awards	François Delisle	Chorus	
2016; 18th Quebec Cinema Awards	Dominique Fortin	Elephant Song	
2016; 18th Quebec Cinema Awards	Hubert Hayaud	Scratch	
2017; 19th Quebec Cinema Awards
2017; 19th Quebec Cinema Awards	Richard Comeau	Two Lovers and a Bear	
2017; 19th Quebec Cinema Awards	Jean-François Bergeron	The 3 L'il Pigs 2 (Les 3 p'tits cochons 2)	
2017; 19th Quebec Cinema Awards	Mathieu Denis	Those Who Make Revolution Halfway Only Dig Their Own Graves (Ceux qui font les révolutions à moitié n'ont fait que se creuser un tombeau)	
2017; 19th Quebec Cinema Awards	Chloé Leriche	Before the Streets (Avant les rues)	
2017; 19th Quebec Cinema Awards	Jules Saulnier	Split (Écartée)	
2018; 20th Quebec Cinema Awards
2018; 20th Quebec Cinema Awards	Dominique Fortin	Family First (Chien de garde)	
2018; 20th Quebec Cinema Awards	Robin Aubert	Tuktuq	
2018; 20th Quebec Cinema Awards	Jared Curtis	Boost	
2018; 20th Quebec Cinema Awards	Aube Foglia	The Little Girl Who Was Too Fond of Matches (La petite fille qui aimait trop les allumettes)	
2018; 20th Quebec Cinema Awards	Felipe Guerrero	X Quinientos	
2019; 21st Quebec Cinema Awards
2019; 21st Quebec Cinema Awards	Yvann Thibaudeau	1991	
2019; 21st Quebec Cinema Awards	Michel Arcand	La Bolduc	
2019; 21st Quebec Cinema Awards	Mathieu Bouchard-Malo	Genesis (Genèse)	
2019; 21st Quebec Cinema Awards	Mathieu Bouchard-Malo	The Great Darkened Days (La grande noirceur)	
2019; 21st Quebec Cinema Awards	Elric Robichon	For Those Who Don't Read Me (À tous ceux qui ne me lisent pas)	

== 2020s ==
Year	Editor	Film	Ref
2020; 22nd Quebec Cinema Awards
2020; 22nd Quebec Cinema Awards	Geoffrey Boulangé, Sophie Deraspe	Antigone	
2020; 22nd Quebec Cinema Awards	Monia Chokri, Justine Gauthier	A Brother's Love (La femme de mon frère)	
2020; 22nd Quebec Cinema Awards	Xavier Dolan	Matthias & Maxime	
2020; 22nd Quebec Cinema Awards	Myriam Poirier	14 Days, 12 Nights (14 jours 12 nuits)	
2020; 22nd Quebec Cinema Awards	Matthew Rankin	The Twentieth Century	
2021; 23rd Quebec Cinema Awards
2021; 23rd Quebec Cinema Awards	Stéphane Lafleur	Goddess of the Fireflies (La déesse des mouches à feu)	
2021; 23rd Quebec Cinema Awards	Aube Foglia	Night of the Kings (La nuit des rois)	
2021; 23rd Quebec Cinema Awards	Michel Grou	Underground (Souterrain)	
2021; 23rd Quebec Cinema Awards	Arthur Tarnowski	The Decline (Jusqu'au déclin)	
2021; 23rd Quebec Cinema Awards	Yvann Thibaudeau	Target Number One	
2022; 24th Quebec Cinema Awards
2022; 24th Quebec Cinema Awards	Arthur Tarnowski	Drunken Birds (Les oiseaux ivres)	
2022; 24th Quebec Cinema Awards	Sophie Farkas Bolla	Beans	
2022; 24th Quebec Cinema Awards	Mathieu Bouchard-Malo	Norbourg	
2022; 24th Quebec Cinema Awards	Aube Foglia	Bootlegger	
2022; 24th Quebec Cinema Awards	Sophie Leblond	Without Havana (Sin la Habana)	
2023; 25th Quebec Cinema Awards
2023; 25th Quebec Cinema Awards	Sophie Leblond	Viking	
2023; 25th Quebec Cinema Awards	Pauline Gaillard	Babysitter	
2023; 25th Quebec Cinema Awards	Myriam Magassouba	Family Game (Arseneault et fils)	
2023; 25th Quebec Cinema Awards	Jonah Malak	Red Rooms (Les Chambres rouges)	
2023; 25th Quebec Cinema Awards	Isabelle Malenfant	The Dishwasher (Le Plongeur)	
2024; 26th Quebec Cinema Awards
2024; 26th Quebec Cinema Awards	Stéphane Lafleur	Humanist Vampire Seeking Consenting Suicidal Person (Vampire humaniste cherche suicidaire consentant)	
2024; 26th Quebec Cinema Awards	Marie-Pier Dupuis, Dominique Fortin, Maxim Rheault	Solo	
2024; 26th Quebec Cinema Awards	Pauline Gaillard	The Nature of Love (Simple comme Sylvain)	
2024; 26th Quebec Cinema Awards	Amélie Labrèche	Richelieu	
2024; 26th Quebec Cinema Awards	Yvann Thibaudeau	1995	
2025; 27th Quebec Cinema Awards
2025; 27th Quebec Cinema Awards	Stéphane Lafleur	Shepherds (Bergers)	
2025; 27th Quebec Cinema Awards	Matthieu Bouchard, Chloé Robichaud	Two Women (Deux femmes en or)	
2025; 27th Quebec Cinema Awards	Xi Feng	Universal Language (Une langue universelle)	
2025; 27th Quebec Cinema Awards	Amélie Labrèche	You Are Not Alone (Vous n'êtes pas seuls)	
2025; 27th Quebec Cinema Awards	Anita Roth	Peak Everything (Amour apocalypse)	

== Multiple wins and nominations ==
=== Multiple wins ===
Wins	Editor
6	Richard Comeau
3	Stéphane Lafleur
2	Lorraine Dufour
2	Dominique Fortin
2	Sophie Leblond
2	Yvann Thibaudeau

=== Three or more nominations ===
Nominations	Editor
8	Richard Comeau
7	Sophie Leblond
6	Michel Arcand
6	Dominique Fortin
5	Jean-François Bergeron
5	Aube Foglia
5	Hélène Girard
5	Yvann Thibaudeau
4	Glenn Berman
4	Mathieu Bouchard-Malo
4	Louise Côté
4	Arthur Tarnowski
3	Xavier Dolan
3	Lorraine Dufour
3	Stéphane Lafleur

== Combined totals for Best Editing and Best Editing in a Documentary ==
=== Multiple wins ===
Wins	Editor
6	Richard Comeau
3	Stéphane Lafleur
2	Lorraine Dufour
2	Dominique Fortin
2	Sophie Leblond
2	Yvann Thibaudeau

=== Three or more nominations ===
Nominations	Editor
8	Richard Comeau
8	Sophie Leblond
6	Michel Arcand
6	Mathieu Bouchard-Malo
6	Aube Foglia
6	Dominique Fortin
5	Jean-François Bergeron
5	Hélène Girard
5	Yvann Thibaudeau
4	Glenn Berman
4	Louise Côté
4	Annie Jean
4	Catherine Legault
4	Arthur Tarnowski
3	Xavier Dolan
3	Lorraine Dufour
3	Michel Giroux
3	Amélie Labrèche
3	Stéphane Lafleur
3	Louis-Martin Paradis

== See also ==
- Canadian Screen Award for Best Editing
