= 24th Genie Awards =

2004 Canadian film awards ceremony

- Date: May 1, 2004
- Site: Metro Toronto Convention Centre; Toronto, Ontario
- Hosted by: Scott Thompson

Highlights
- Best Picture: The Barbarian Invasions
- Most awards: The Barbarian Invasions (6)
- Most nominations: Seducing Doctor Lewis (11)

Television coverage
- Network: Citytv, Bravo!, Star!, Access Alberta

The 24th Genie Awards were held on May 1, 2004, to honour films released in 2003. The ceremony was hosted by Scott Thompson. The ceremony was broadcast on CHUM Limited's terrestrial Citytv and Access Alberta networks, as well as on the cable channels Bravo! and Star!.

Nominations were announced on March 16, 2004. The film Seducing Doctor Lewis garnered the most nominations with 11 nods, although it was virtually shut out on the night of the ceremony, winning only the award for Best Cinematography. Denys Arcand's The Barbarian Invasions was the night's big winner, winning six awards including Best Picture. Arcand joked, however, that he had won only because neither David Cronenberg nor Atom Egoyan had a film in competition.

Sarah Polley's Best Actress win for My Life Without Me was the only one of the six top awards not won by The Barbarian Invasions. Polley took the opportunity in her speech to lament the state of Canadian film: "We make great movies in this country and it's a shame that the Canadian public never gets to see them."

== Nominees and winners ==
Motion Picture	Direction
The Barbarian Invasions (Les Invasions barbares) — Denise Robert, Daniel Louis, Fabienne Vonier; Far Side of the Moon (La Face cachée de la lune) — Bob Krupinski, Mario St-Laurent; Owning Mahowny — Alessandro Camon, Seaton McLean, Andras Hamori; Seducing Doctor Lewis (La Grande séduction) — Luc Vandal, Roger Frappier; The Snow Walker — Robert Merilees, William Vince	Denys Arcand, The Barbarian Invasions (Les Invasions barbares); Robert Lepage, Far Side of the Moon (La Face cachée de la lune); Guy Maddin, The Saddest Music in the World; Jean-François Pouliot, Seducing Doctor Lewis (La Grande séduction); Charles Martin Smith, The Snow Walker
Actor in a leading role	Actress in a leading role
Rémy Girard, The Barbarian Invasions (Les Invasions barbares); Raymond Bouchard, Seducing Doctor Lewis (La Grande séduction); Philip Seymour Hoffman, Owning Mahowny; Robert Lepage, Far Side of the Moon (La Face cachée de la lune); Barry Pepper, The Snow Walker	Sarah Polley, My Life Without Me; Rebecca Jenkins, Marion Bridge; Micheline Lanctôt, How My Mother Gave Birth to Me During Menopause (Comment ma mère accoucha de moi durant sa ménopause); Molly Parker, Marion Bridge; Karine Vanasse, Séraphin: Heart of Stone (Séraphin: un homme et son péché)
Actor in a supporting role	Actress in a supporting role
Stéphane Rousseau, The Barbarian Invasions (Les Invasions barbares); Benoît Brière, Seducing Doctor Lewis (La Grande séduction); Roy Dupuis, Séraphin: Heart of Stone (Séraphin: un homme et son péché); David Hayman, The Wild Dogs; Christopher Plummer, Blizzard	Marie-Josée Croze, The Barbarian Invasions (Les Invasions barbares); Olympia Dukakis, The Event; Emily Hampshire, A Problem with Fear; Meredith McGeachie, Punch; Annabella Piugattuk, The Snow Walker
Original Screenplay	Adapted Screenplay
Denys Arcand, The Barbarian Invasions (Les Invasions barbares); Louis Bélanger, Gaz Bar Blues; Sébastien Rose, How My Mother Gave Birth to Me During Menopause (Comment ma mère accoucha de moi durant sa ménopause); Ken Scott, Seducing Doctor Lewis (La Grande séduction); Peter Wellington, Luck	Robert Lepage, Far Side of the Moon (La Face cachée de la lune); Maurice Chauvet, Owning Mahowny; Daniel MacIvor, Marion Bridge; Charles Martin Smith, The Snow Walker; Esta Spalding, Falling Angels
Best Live Action Short Drama	Best Animated Short
Noël Blank — Christiane Ciupka and Jean-François Rivard; Evelyn: The Cutest Evil Dead Girl — Jim Mauro, Brad Peyton; Lonesome Joe — Leah Mallen, Mark Sawers; Short Hymn, Silent War — Kate Kung, Charles Officer, Sandy Reimer; Why Don't You Dance? — Joel Awerbuck, Michael Downing	Falling in Love Again — Marcy Page, Munro Ferguson; Islet (Îlot) — Michèle Bélanger, Nicolas Brault; Stormy Night (Nuit d'orage) — Marcel Jean, Jean-Jacques Leduc, Michèle Lemieux
Art Direction/Production Design	Cinematography
Rob Gray and Christina Kuhnigk, Falling Angels; Don Taylor and Carolyn 'Cal' Loucks, The Gospel of John; Normand Sarazin, Seducing Doctor Lewis (La Grande séduction); Jean Bécotte, Séraphin: Heart of Stone (Séraphin: un homme et son péché); Christian Légaré, Saved by the Belles	Allen Smith, Seducing Doctor Lewis (La Grande séduction); François Dutil, Saved by the Belles; Stefan Ivanov, A Problem with Fear; Gregory Middleton, Falling Angels; Jean-Pierre St. Louis, Gaz Bar Blues
Costume Design	Editing
Meg McMillan, The Saddest Music in the World; Abram Waterhouse, Blizzard; Debra Hanson, The Gospel of John; Louise Gagné, Seducing Doctor Lewis (La Grande séduction); Michèle Hamel, Séraphin: Heart of Stone (Séraphin: un homme et son péché)	David Wharnsby, The Saddest Music in the World; Dominique Fortin, Seducing Doctor Lewis (La Grande séduction); Isabelle Dedieu, The Barbarian Invasions (Les Invasions barbares); Alison Grace, The Snow Walker; Michael Weir, The Wild Dogs
Overall Sound	Sound Editing
Bruce Carwardine, Todd Beckett, Michael O'Farrell and Don White, The Statement; Warren St. Onge, Steph Carrier and Lou Solakofski, Falling Angels; Claude Hazanavicius and Michel Descombes, Seducing Doctor Lewis (La Grande séduction); Michel Descombes, Gavin Fernandes and Patrick Rousseau, The Barbarian Invasions (Les Invasions barbares); Chris Duesterdiek, Mark Berger, Dean Giammarco and Bill Sheppard, The Snow Walker	Michael O'Farrell, Mark Gingras, Paul Intson, Goro Koyama, John Laing, Andy Malcolm, Jill Purdy, and John Douglas Smith, The Statement; David McCallum, Steven Hammond, Ronayne Higginson, David Rose and Jane Tattersall, Falling Angels; Marcel Pothier, Guy Francoeur, Carole Gagnon, Antoine Morin and Jacques Plante, Seducing Doctor Lewis (La Grande séduction); Marie-Claude Gagné, Diane Boucher, Jérôme Décarie, Claire Pochon and Jean-Philippe Savard, The Barbarian Invasions (Les Invasions barbares); Maureen Murphy, Dean Giammarco, Robert Hunter, Johnny Ludgate and Christine McLeod, The Snow Walker
Achievement in Music: Original Score	Achievement in Music: Original Song
Christopher Dedrick, The Saddest Music in the World; Richard Grassby-Lewis, Jon Hassell, Bob Locke, Tim Norfolk, Owning Mahowny; Michel Cusson, Séraphin: Heart of Stone (Séraphin: un homme et son péché); Mychael Danna, The Snow Walker; Sandy Moore, The Wild Dogs	Ken Whiteley, "Tell Me" — Falling Angels; Pamela Phillips-Oland, David Martin and LeVar Burton, "Center of My Heart" — Blizzard; Adam James Broughton, Jeanne Dompierre, Steve Galluccio and FM Le Sieur, "Montréal Italiano" — Mambo Italiano; Brian C. Warren and Mark Anthony, "La Vie" — Saved by the Belles; Luc Plamondon and Michel Cusson, "Depuis le premier jour" — Séraphin: Heart of Stone (Séraphin: un homme et son péché)
Best Documentary	Special awards
FIX: The Story of an Addicted City — Betsy Carson, Nettie Wild; Go Further — Ron Mann; The Last Round: Chuvalo vs. Ali — Silva Basmajian, Joseph Blasioli	Claude Jutra Award: Sébastien Rose, How My Mother Gave Birth to Me During Menopause (Comment ma mère accoucha de moi durant sa ménopause); Golden Reel Award: Séraphin: Heart of Stone (Séraphin: un homme et son péché); Special Achievement: Peter R. Simpson
