= Prix Iris for Best Director =

Annual Canadian film award

Québec Cinéma presents an annual award for Best Director (French: Prix Iris de la meilleure réalisation) to recognize the best in the Cinema of Quebec.

Until 2016, it was known as the Jutra Award for Best Director in memory of influential Quebec film director Claude Jutra. Following the withdrawal of Jutra's name from the award, the 2016 award was presented under the name Québec Cinéma. The Prix Iris name was announced in October 2016.

Xavier Dolan received the most nominations, with six, while Denis Villeneuve received the most awards, with three. Villeneuve is the only director to win two consecutive awards, for Polytechnique in 2010 and Incendies 2011, while Dolan is the only director to receive two nominations in the same year, for Mommy and Tom at the Farm (Tom à la ferme) in 2015.

To date, twenty women were nominated for a total of twenty-seven nominations, with Léa Pool, Anne Émond, Sophie Dupuis, Monia Chokri and Sophie Deraspe receiving multiple nominations. The first to receive a nomination was Manon Briand at the first ceremony for 2 Seconds (2 secondes). Six women have won the award so far, the first being Lyne Charlebois in 2009 for Borderline.

== 1990s ==
Year	Director	Film	Ref
1999; 1st Jutra Awards
1999; 1st Jutra Awards	François Girard	The Red Violin (Le violon rouge)	
1999; 1st Jutra Awards	Manon Briand	2 Seconds (2 secondes)	
1999; 1st Jutra Awards	Robert Lepage	Nô	
1999; 1st Jutra Awards	Denis Villeneuve	August 32nd on Earth (Un 32 août sur terre)	

== 2000s ==
Year	Director	Film	Ref
2000; 2nd Jutra Awards
2000; 2nd Jutra Awards	Louis Bélanger	Post Mortem	
2000; 2nd Jutra Awards	François Bouvier	Winter Stories (Histoires d'hiver)	
2000; 2nd Jutra Awards	Jean-Philippe Duval	Matroni and Me (Matroni et moi)	
2000; 2nd Jutra Awards	Léa Pool	Set Me Free (Emporte-moi)	
2001; 3rd Jutra Awards
2001; 3rd Jutra Awards	Denis Villeneuve	Maelström	
2001; 3rd Jutra Awards	Philippe Falardeau	The Left-Hand Side of the Fridge (La moitié gauche du frigo)	
2001; 3rd Jutra Awards	Robert Favreau	The Orphan Muses (Les muses orphelines)	
2001; 3rd Jutra Awards	Michel Jetté	Hochelaga	
2002; 4th Jutra Awards
2002; 4th Jutra Awards	André Turpin	Soft Shell Man (Un crabe dans la tête)	
2002; 4th Jutra Awards	Denis Chouinard	Tar Angel (L'ange de goudron)	
2002; 4th Jutra Awards	Pierre Falardeau	February 15, 1839 (15 février 1839)	
2002; 4th Jutra Awards	Catherine Martin	Marriages (Mariages)	
2003; 5th Jutra Awards
2003; 5th Jutra Awards	Ricardo Trogi	Québec-Montréal	
2003; 5th Jutra Awards	Michael MacKenzie	The Baroness and the Pig	
2003; 5th Jutra Awards	Robert Morin	The Negro (Le nèg')	
2003; 5th Jutra Awards	Kim Nguyen	The Marsh (Le marais)	
2004; 6th Jutra Awards
2004; 6th Jutra Awards	Denys Arcand	The Barbarian Invasions (Les invasions barbares)	
2004; 6th Jutra Awards	Louis Bélanger	Gaz Bar Blues	
2004; 6th Jutra Awards	Bernard Émond	8:17 p.m. Darling Street (20h17 rue Darling)	
2004; 6th Jutra Awards	Jean-François Pouliot	Seducing Doctor Lewis (La grande Séduction)	
2005; 7th Jutra Awards
2005; 7th Jutra Awards	Francis Leclerc	Looking for Alexander (Mémoires affectives)	
2005; 7th Jutra Awards	Denise Filiatrault	Bittersweet Memories (Ma vie en cinémascope)	
2005; 7th Jutra Awards	Pierre Houle	Machine Gun Molly (Monica la mitraille)	
2005; 7th Jutra Awards	Yves Pelletier	Love and Magnets (Les aimants)	
2006; 8th Jutra Awards
2006; 8th Jutra Awards	Jean-Marc Vallée	C.R.A.Z.Y.	
2006; 8th Jutra Awards	Charles Binamé	The Rocket (Maurice Richard)	
2006; 8th Jutra Awards	Bernard Émond	The Novena (La neuvaine)	
2006; 8th Jutra Awards	Ricardo Trogi	Dodging the Clock (Horloge biologique)	
2007; 9th Jutra Awards
2007; 9th Jutra Awards	Philippe Falardeau	Congorama	
2007; 9th Jutra Awards	Érik Canuel	Bon Cop, Bad Cop	
2007; 9th Jutra Awards	Robert Favreau	A Sunday in Kigali (Un dimanche à Kigali)	
2007; 9th Jutra Awards	Claude Gagnon	Kamataki	
2008; 10th Jutra Awards
2008; 10th Jutra Awards	Stéphane Lafleur	Continental, a Film Without Guns (Continental, un film sans fusil)	
2008; 10th Jutra Awards	Denys Arcand	Days of Darkness (L'âge des ténèbres)	
2008; 10th Jutra Awards	Fernand Dansereau	Twilight (La brunante)	
2008; 10th Jutra Awards	Bernard Émond	Summit Circle (Contre toute espérance)	
2009; 11th Jutra Awards
2009; 11th Jutra Awards	Lyne Charlebois	Borderline	
2009; 11th Jutra Awards	Yves Christian Fournier	Everything Is Fine (Tout est parfait)	
2009; 11th Jutra Awards	Robert Morin	Daddy Goes Ptarmigan Hunting (Papa à la chasse aux lagopèdes)	
2009; 11th Jutra Awards	Benoît Pilon	The Necessities of Life (Ce qu'il faut pour vivre)	

== 2010s ==
Year	Director	Film	Ref
2010; 12th Jutra Awards
2010; 12th Jutra Awards	Denis Villeneuve	Polytechnique	
2010; 12th Jutra Awards	Marie-Hélène Cousineau and Madeline Ivalu	Before Tomorrow (Le jour avant le lendemain)	
2010; 12th Jutra Awards	Xavier Dolan	I Killed My Mother (J'ai tué ma mère)	
2010; 12th Jutra Awards	Jean-Philippe Duval	Through the Mist (Dédé, à travers les brumes)	
2010; 12th Jutra Awards	Ricardo Trogi	1981	
2011; 13th Jutra Awards
2011; 13th Jutra Awards	Denis Villeneuve	Incendies	
2011; 13th Jutra Awards	Denis Côté	Curling	
2011; 13th Jutra Awards	Xavier Dolan	Heartbeats (Les amours imaginaires)	
2011; 13th Jutra Awards	Daniel Grou	10½	
2011; 13th Jutra Awards	Kim Nguyen	City of Shadows (La cité)	
2012; 14th Jutra Awards
2012; 14th Jutra Awards	Philippe Falardeau	Monsieur Lazhar	
2012; 14th Jutra Awards	Anne Émond	Nuit #1	
2012; 14th Jutra Awards	Micheline Lanctôt	For the Love of God (Pour l'amour de Dieu)	
2012; 14th Jutra Awards	Ken Scott	Starbuck	
2012; 14th Jutra Awards	Jean-Marc Vallée	Café de Flore	
2013; 15th Jutra Awards
2013; 15th Jutra Awards	Kim Nguyen	War Witch (Rebelle)	
2013; 15th Jutra Awards	Xavier Dolan	Laurence Anyways	
2013; 15th Jutra Awards	Ivan Grbovic	Romeo Eleven (Roméo Onze)	
2013; 15th Jutra Awards	Daniel Grou	L'Affaire Dumont	
2013; 15th Jutra Awards	Rafaël Ouellet	Camion	
2014; 16th Jutra Awards
2014; 16th Jutra Awards	Louise Archambault	Gabrielle	
2014; 16th Jutra Awards	Denis Côté	Vic and Flo Saw a Bear (Vic+Flo ont vu un ours)	
2014; 16th Jutra Awards	Robert Lepage and Pedro Pires	Triptych (Triptyque)	
2014; 16th Jutra Awards	Sébastien Pilote	The Dismantling (Le démantèlement)	
2014; 16th Jutra Awards	Daniel Roby	Louis Cyr (Louis Cyr: L'homme le plus fort du monde)	
2015; 17th Jutra Awards
2015; 17th Jutra Awards	Xavier Dolan	Mommy	
2015; 17th Jutra Awards	Xavier Dolan	Tom at the Farm (Tom à la ferme)	
2015; 17th Jutra Awards	Stéphane Lafleur	You're Sleeping Nicole (Tu dors Nicole)	
2015; 17th Jutra Awards	Robert Morin	3 Indian Tales (3 histoires d'indiens)	
2015; 17th Jutra Awards	Denis Villeneuve	Enemy	
2016; 18th Quebec Cinema Awards
2016; 18th Quebec Cinema Awards	Léa Pool	The Passion of Augustine (La passion d'Augustine)	
2016; 18th Quebec Cinema Awards	Mathieu Denis	Corbo	
2016; 18th Quebec Cinema Awards	Anne Émond	Our Loved Ones (Les êtres chers)	
2016; 18th Quebec Cinema Awards	Maxime Giroux	Felix and Meira (Félix et Meira)	
2016; 18th Quebec Cinema Awards	Philippe Lesage	The Demons (Les démons)	
2017; 19th Quebec Cinema Awards
2017; 19th Quebec Cinema Awards	Xavier Dolan	It's Only the End of the World (Juste la fin du monde)	
2017; 19th Quebec Cinema Awards	Louis Bélanger	Bad Seeds (Les mauvaises herbes)	
2017; 19th Quebec Cinema Awards	Bachir Bensaddek	Montreal, White City (Montréal la blanche)	
2017; 19th Quebec Cinema Awards	Chloé Leriche	Before the Streets (Avant les rues)	
2017; 19th Quebec Cinema Awards	Kim Nguyen	Two Lovers and a Bear	
2018; 20th Quebec Cinema Awards
2018; 20th Quebec Cinema Awards	Robin Aubert	Ravenous (Les affamés)	
2018; 20th Quebec Cinema Awards	Darren Curtis	Boost	
2018; 20th Quebec Cinema Awards	Sophie Dupuis	Family First (Chien de garde)	
2018; 20th Quebec Cinema Awards	Robert Morin	Infiltration (Le problème d'infiltration)	
2018; 20th Quebec Cinema Awards	Luc Picard	Cross My Heart (Les rois mongols)	
2019; 21st Quebec Cinema Awards
2019; 21st Quebec Cinema Awards	Ricardo Trogi	1991	
2019; 21st Quebec Cinema Awards	Denis Côté	Ghost Town Anthology (Répertoire des villes disparues)	
2019; 21st Quebec Cinema Awards	Geneviève Dulude-De Celles	A Colony (Une colonie)	
2019; 21st Quebec Cinema Awards	Maxime Giroux	The Great Darkened Days (La grande noirceur)	
2019; 21st Quebec Cinema Awards	Yan Giroux	For Those Who Don't Read Me (À tous ceux qui ne me lisent pas)	

== 2020s ==
Year	Director	Film	Ref
2020; 22nd Quebec Cinema Awards
2020; 22nd Quebec Cinema Awards	Sophie Deraspe	Antigone	
2020; 22nd Quebec Cinema Awards	Monia Chokri	A Brother's Love (La femme de mon frère)	
2020; 22nd Quebec Cinema Awards	Guillaume de Fontenay	Sympathy for the Devil (Sympathie pour le diable)	
2020; 22nd Quebec Cinema Awards	Matthew Rankin	The Twentieth Century	
2020; 22nd Quebec Cinema Awards	Myriam Verreault	Kuessipan	
2021; 23rd Quebec Cinema Awards
2021; 23rd Quebec Cinema Awards	Anaïs Barbeau-Lavalette	Goddess of the Fireflies (La déesse des mouches à feu)	
2021; 23rd Quebec Cinema Awards	Sophie Dupuis	Underground (Souterrain)	
2021; 23rd Quebec Cinema Awards	Philippe Falardeau	My Salinger Year	
2021; 23rd Quebec Cinema Awards	Benoît Pilon	The Vinland Club (Le club Vinland)	
2021; 23rd Quebec Cinema Awards	Daniel Roby	Target Number One	
2022; 24th Quebec Cinema Awards
2022; 24th Quebec Cinema Awards	Ivan Grbovic	Drunken Birds (Les oiseaux ivres)	
2022; 24th Quebec Cinema Awards	Tracey Deer	Beans	
2022; 24th Quebec Cinema Awards	Maxime Giroux	Norbourg	
2022; 24th Quebec Cinema Awards	Kaveh Nabatian	Without Havana (Sin la Habana)	
2022; 24th Quebec Cinema Awards	Sébastien Pilote	Maria Chapdelaine	
2023; 25th Quebec Cinema Awards
2023; 25th Quebec Cinema Awards	Stéphane Lafleur	Viking	
2023; 25th Quebec Cinema Awards	Monia Chokri	Babysitter	
2023; 25th Quebec Cinema Awards	Francis Leclerc	The Dishwasher (Le plongeur)	
2023; 25th Quebec Cinema Awards	Rafaël Ouellet	Family Game (Arseneault et fils)	
2023; 25th Quebec Cinema Awards	Pascal Plante	Red Rooms (Les chambres rouges)	
2024; 26th Quebec Cinema Awards
2024; 26th Quebec Cinema Awards	Monia Chokri	The Nature of Love (Simple comme Sylvain)	
2024; 26th Quebec Cinema Awards	Pier-Philippe Chevigny	Richelieu	
2024; 26th Quebec Cinema Awards	Sophie Dupuis	Solo	
2024; 26th Quebec Cinema Awards	Ariane Louis-Seize	Humanist Vampire Seeking Consenting Suicidal Person (Vampire humaniste cherche suicidaire consentant)	
2024; 26th Quebec Cinema Awards	Ricardo Trogi	1995	
2025; 27th Quebec Cinema Awards
2025; 27th Quebec Cinema Awards	Matthew Rankin	Universal Language (Une langue universelle)	
2025; 27th Quebec Cinema Awards	Sophie Deraspe	Shepherds (Bergers)	
2025; 27th Quebec Cinema Awards	Anne Émond	Peak Everything (Amour apocalypse)	
2025; 27th Quebec Cinema Awards	Philippe Lesage	Who by Fire (Comme le feu)	
2025; 27th Quebec Cinema Awards	Chloé Robichaud	Two Women (Deux femmes en or)	

== Multiple wins and nominations ==
=== Multiple wins ===
Wins	Director
3	Denis Villeneuve
2	Xavier Dolan
2	Philippe Falardeau
2	Stéphane Lafleur
2	Ricardo Trogi

=== Three or more nominations ===
Nominations	Director
6	Xavier Dolan
5	Ricardo Trogi
5	Denis Villeneuve
4	Philippe Falardeau
4	Robert Morin
4	Kim Nguyen
3	Louis Bélanger
3	Monia Chokri
3	Denis Côté
3	Sophie Dupuis
3	Anne Émond
3	Bernard Émond
3	Maxime Giroux
3	Stéphane Lafleur

== See also ==
- Canadian Screen Award for Best Director
