= Prix Iris for Best Film =

Annual film award

The Prix Iris for Best Film (French: Prix Iris du meilleur film) is an annual film award presented Québec Cinéma as part of its Prix Iris program, to honour the year's best film made within the Cinema of Quebec.

Until 2016, it was known as the Jutra Award for Best Film in memory of influential Quebec film director Claude Jutra. Following the withdrawal of Jutra's name from the award, the 2016 award was presented under the name Québec Cinéma. The Prix Iris name was announced in October 2016.

Producing duo Luc Déry and Kim McCraw received the most nominations and awards. Together, they were nominated for thirteen films and won six awards, while Déry received another nomination and win for Soft Shell Man (Un crabe dans la tête) before their partnership. The pair also won two consecutive awards thrice, first in 2007 and 2008, then in 2011 and 2012 and finally in 2022 and 2023.

== 1990s ==
Year	Film	Producers	Ref
1999; 1st Jutra Awards
1999; 1st Jutra Awards	The Red Violin (Le violon rouge)	Niv Fichman	
1999; 1st Jutra Awards	2 Seconds (2 secondes)	Roger Frappier	
1999; 1st Jutra Awards	August 32nd on Earth (Un 32 août sur terre)	Roger Frappier	
1999; 1st Jutra Awards	Nô	Bruno Jobin	

== 2000s ==
Year	Film	Producers	Ref
2000; 2nd Jutra Awards
2000; 2nd Jutra Awards	Post Mortem	Lorraine Dufour	
2000; 2nd Jutra Awards	The Last Breath (Le dernier souffle)	Jacques Bonin, Claude Veillet, Lucie Veillet, Sylvie Roy	
2000; 2nd Jutra Awards	Memories Unlocked (Souvenirs intimes)	Jean-Roch Marcotte	
2000; 2nd Jutra Awards	Set Me Free (Emporte-moi)	Louis Laverdière	
2001; 3rd Jutra Awards
2001; 3rd Jutra Awards	Maelström	Roger Frappier, Luc Vandal	
2001; 3rd Jutra Awards	Hochelaga	Michel Jetté, Louise Sabourin	
2001; 3rd Jutra Awards	Life After Love (La vie après l'amour)	Roger Frappier, Luc Vandal	
2001; 3rd Jutra Awards	The Orphan Muses (Les muses orphelines)	Lyse Lafontaine, Pierre Latour	
2002; 4th Jutra Awards
2002; 4th Jutra Awards	Soft Shell Man (Un crabe dans la tête)	Luc Déry, Joseph Hillel	
2002; 4th Jutra Awards	February 15, 1839 (15 février 1839)	Bernadette Payeur	
2002; 4th Jutra Awards	Tar Angel (L'ange de goudron)	Roger Frappier, Luc Vandal	
2002; 4th Jutra Awards	The Woman Who Drinks (La femme qui boit)	Bernadette Payeur	
2003; 5th Jutra Awards
2003; 5th Jutra Awards	Québec-Montréal	Nicole Robert	
2003; 5th Jutra Awards	The Collector (Le collectionneur)	Christian Larouche, Ginette Petit	
2003; 5th Jutra Awards	The Marsh (Le marais)	Yves Fortin	
2003; 5th Jutra Awards	Séraphin: Heart of Stone (Séraphin: un homme et son péché)	Lorraine Richard	
2004; 6th Jutra Awards
2004; 6th Jutra Awards	The Barbarian Invasions (Les invasions barbares)	Denise Robert, Daniel Louis	
2004; 6th Jutra Awards	Far Side of the Moon (La face cachée de la lune)	Bob Krupinski, Mario St-Laurent	
2004; 6th Jutra Awards	Gaz Bar Blues	Lorraine Dufour	
2004; 6th Jutra Awards	Seducing Doctor Lewis (La grande séduction)	Roger Frappier, Luc Vandal	
2005; 7th Jutra Awards
2005; 7th Jutra Awards	Looking for Alexander (Mémoires affectives)	Barbara Shrier	
2005; 7th Jutra Awards	Bittersweet Memories (Ma vie en cinémascope)	Denise Robert, Daniel Louis	
2005; 7th Jutra Awards	The Five of Us (Elles étaient cinq)	Maxime Rémillard, Richard Lalonde	
2005; 7th Jutra Awards	Love and Magnets (Les aimants)	Nicole Robert, Gabriel Pelletier	
2006; 8th Jutra Awards
2006; 8th Jutra Awards	C.R.A.Z.Y.	Pierre Even, Jean-Marc Vallée	
2006; 8th Jutra Awards	Audition (L'audition)	Luc Martineau, Lorraine Richard	
2006; 8th Jutra Awards	The Novena (La neuvaine)	Bernadette Payeur	
2006; 8th Jutra Awards	The Rocket (Maurice Richard)	Denise Robert, Daniel Louis	
2007; 9th Jutra Awards
2007; 9th Jutra Awards	Congorama	Luc Déry, Kim McCraw	
2007; 9th Jutra Awards	Bon Cop, Bad Cop	Kevin Tierney	
2007; 9th Jutra Awards	The Secret Life of Happy People (La vie secrète des gens heureux)	Roger Frappier, Luc Vandal	
2007; 9th Jutra Awards	A Sunday in Kigali (Un dimanche à Kigali)	Lyse Lafontaine, Michael Mosca	
2008; 10th Jutra Awards
2008; 10th Jutra Awards	Continental, a Film Without Guns (Continental, un film sans fusil)	Luc Déry, Kim McCraw	
2008; 10th Jutra Awards	Days of Darkness (L'âge des ténèbres)	Denise Robert, Daniel Louis	
2008; 10th Jutra Awards	The 3 L'il Pigs (Les 3 p'tits cochons)	Pierre Gendron, Christian Larouche	
2008; 10th Jutra Awards	Twilight (La brunante)	Jean-Roch Marcotte	
2009; 11th Jutra Awards
2009; 11th Jutra Awards	The Necessities of Life (Ce qu'il faut pour vivre)	Bernadette Payeur, René Chénier	
2009; 11th Jutra Awards	Borderline	Roger Frappier, Luc Vandal	
2009; 11th Jutra Awards	It's Not Me, I Swear! (C'est pas moi, je le jure!)	Luc Déry, Kim McCraw	
2009; 11th Jutra Awards	Mommy Is at the Hairdresser's (Maman est chez le coiffeur)	Lyse Lafontaine, Michael Mosca	

== 2010s ==
Year	Film	Producers	Ref
2010; 12th Jutra Awards
2010; 12th Jutra Awards	I Killed My Mother (J'ai tué ma mère)	Xavier Dolan, Carole Mondello, Daniel Morin	
2010; 12th Jutra Awards	1981	Nicole Robert	
2010; 12th Jutra Awards	Before Tomorrow (Le jour avant le lendemain)	Stéphane Rituit, Norman Cohn, Zacharias Kunuk	
2010; 12th Jutra Awards	Polytechnique	Maxime Rémillard, Don Carmody	
2010; 12th Jutra Awards	Through the Mist (Dédé, à travers les brumes)	Roger Frappier, Luc Vandal	
2011; 13th Jutra Awards
2011; 13th Jutra Awards	Incendies	Luc Déry, Kim McCraw	
2011; 13th Jutra Awards	10½	Pierre Gendron	
2011; 13th Jutra Awards	Curling	Stéphanie Morissette, Denis Côté	
2011; 13th Jutra Awards	Heartbeats (Les amours imaginaires)	Xavier Dolan, Daniel Morin, Carole Mondello	
2011; 13th Jutra Awards	Vital Signs (Les signes vitaux)	Nicolas Fonseca	
2012; 14th Jutra Awards
2012; 14th Jutra Awards	Monsieur Lazhar	Luc Déry, Kim McCraw	
2012; 14th Jutra Awards	Coteau rouge	Linda Pinet, André Forcier	
2012; 14th Jutra Awards	Nuit#1	Nancy Grant, Sylvain Corbeil	
2012; 14th Jutra Awards	The Salesman (Le vendeur)	Bernadette Payeur, Marc Daigle	
2012; 14th Jutra Awards	Starbuck	André Rouleau	
2013; 15th Jutra Awards
2013; 15th Jutra Awards	War Witch (Rebelle)	Pierre Even, Marie-Claude Poulin	
2013; 15th Jutra Awards	Camion	Stéphanie Morissette	
2013; 15th Jutra Awards	Inch'Allah	Luc Déry, Kim McCraw	
2013; 15th Jutra Awards	Laurence Anyways	Charles Gillibert, Nathanaël Karmitz, Lyse Lafontaine	
2013; 15th Jutra Awards	Romeo Eleven (Roméo Onze)	Paul Barbeau	
2014; 16th Jutra Awards
2014; 16th Jutra Awards	Louis Cyr (Louis Cyr: L'homme le plus fort du monde)	Christian Larouche, Caroline Héroux, Stephanie Heroux	
2014; 16th Jutra Awards	Catimini	Nicolas Comeau, Nathalie Saint-Pierre	
2014; 16th Jutra Awards	Diego Star	Pascal Bascaron, Sylvain Corbeil, Nancy Grant, Marion Hänsel	
2014; 16th Jutra Awards	The Dismantling (Le démantèlement)	Marc Daigle, Bernadette Payeur	
2014; 16th Jutra Awards	Gabrielle	Luc Déry, Kim McCraw	
2015; 17th Jutra Awards
2015; 17th Jutra Awards	Mommy	Nancy Grant, Xavier Dolan	
2015; 17th Jutra Awards	1987	Nicole Robert	
2015; 17th Jutra Awards	3 Indian Tales (3 histoires d'indiens)	Virginie Dubois, Robert Morin	
2015; 17th Jutra Awards	Tom at the Farm (Tom à la ferme)	Xavier Dolan, Nancy Grant, Lyse Lafontaine, Charles Gillibert, Nathanaël Karmitz	
2015; 17th Jutra Awards	You're Sleeping Nicole (Tu dors Nicole)	Luc Déry, Kim McCraw	
2016; 18th Quebec Cinema Awards
2016; 18th Quebec Cinema Awards	The Passion of Augustine (La passion d'Augustine)	Lyse Lafontaine, François Tremblay	
2016; 18th Quebec Cinema Awards	Corbo	Félize Frappier	
2016; 18th Quebec Cinema Awards	The Demons (Les démons)	Philippe Lesage, Galilé Marion-Gauvin	
2016; 18th Quebec Cinema Awards	Felix and Meira (Félix et Meira)	Sylvain Corbeil, Nancy Grant, Maxime Giroux	
2016; 18th Quebec Cinema Awards	Our Loved Ones (Les êtres chers)	Sylvain Corbeil, Nancy Grant	
2017; 19th Quebec Cinema Awards
2017; 19th Quebec Cinema Awards	It's Only the End of the World (Juste la fin du monde)	Sylvain Corbeil, Nancy Grant, Xavier Dolan, Elisha Karmitz, Nathanaël Karmitz, Michel Merkt	
2017; 19th Quebec Cinema Awards	Bad Seeds (Les mauvaises herbes)	Lorraine Dufour, Luc Vandal	
2017; 19th Quebec Cinema Awards	Before the Streets (Avant les rues)	Chloé Leriche	
2017; 19th Quebec Cinema Awards	Those Who Make Revolution Halfway Only Dig Their Own Graves (Ceux qui font les révolutions à moitié n'ont fait que se creuser un tombeau)	Hany Ouichou	
2017; 19th Quebec Cinema Awards	Two Lovers and a Bear	Roger Frappier, Jonathan Bronfman, Ellen Hamilton	
2018; 20th Quebec Cinema Awards
2018; 20th Quebec Cinema Awards	Ravenous (Les affamés)	Stéphanie Morissette	
2018; 20th Quebec Cinema Awards	Boost	Frédéric Bohbot, Kieran Crilly, Darren Curtis	
2018; 20th Quebec Cinema Awards	Cross My Heart (Les rois mongols)	Stéphanie Pages, Luc Chatelain	
2018; 20th Quebec Cinema Awards	Family First (Chien de garde)	Étienne Hansez	
2018; 20th Quebec Cinema Awards	Infiltration (Le problème d'infiltration)	Luc Vandal	
2018; 20th Quebec Cinema Awards	The Little Girl Who Was Too Fond of Matches (La petite fille qui aimait trop les allumettes)	Marcel Giroux	
2018; 20th Quebec Cinema Awards	Tuktuq	Robin Aubert	
2019; 21st Quebec Cinema Awards
2019; 21st Quebec Cinema Awards	1991	Nicole Robert	
2019; 21st Quebec Cinema Awards	La Bolduc	Valérie D'Auteuil, André Rouleau	
2019; 21st Quebec Cinema Awards	A Colony (Une colonie)	Fanny Drew, Sarah Mannering	
2019; 21st Quebec Cinema Awards	For Those Who Don't Read Me (À tous ceux qui ne me lisent pas)	Luc Déry, Élaine Hébert, Kim McCraw	
2019; 21st Quebec Cinema Awards	Genesis (Genèse)	Galilé Marion-Gauvin	
2019; 21st Quebec Cinema Awards	Ghost Town Anthology (Répertoire des villes disparues)	Ziad Touma	
2019; 21st Quebec Cinema Awards	The Great Darkened Days (La grande noirceur)	Sylvain Corbeil, Nancy Grant	

== 2020s ==
Year	Film	Producers	Ref
2020; 22nd Quebec Cinema Awards
2020; 22nd Quebec Cinema Awards	Antigone	Marc Daigle	
2020; 22nd Quebec Cinema Awards	And the Birds Rained Down (Il pleuvait des oiseaux)	Ginette Petit	
2020; 22nd Quebec Cinema Awards	A Brother's Love (La femme de mon frère)	Sylvain Corbeil, Nancy Grant	
2020; 22nd Quebec Cinema Awards	Fabulous (Fabuleuses)	Nicole Robert	
2020; 22nd Quebec Cinema Awards	Kuessipan	Félize Frappier	
2020; 22nd Quebec Cinema Awards	Mafia Inc.	Antonello Cozzolino, Valérie D'Auteuil, André Rouleau	
2020; 22nd Quebec Cinema Awards	Young Juliette (Jeune Juliette)	Sylvain Corbeil	
2021; 23rd Quebec Cinema Awards
2021; 23rd Quebec Cinema Awards	Goddess of the Fireflies (La déesse des mouches à feu)	Luc Vandal	
2021; 23rd Quebec Cinema Awards	My Salinger Year	Luc Déry, Kim McCraw, Ruth Coady, Susan Mullen	
2021; 23rd Quebec Cinema Awards	Nadia, Butterfly	Dominique Dussault	
2021; 23rd Quebec Cinema Awards	Underground (Souterrain)	Étienne Hansez	
2021; 23rd Quebec Cinema Awards	The Vinland Club (Le club Vinland)	Chantal Lafleur	
2022; 24th Quebec Cinema Awards
2022; 24th Quebec Cinema Awards	Drunken Birds (Les oiseaux ivres)	Luc Déry, Kim McCraw	
2022; 24th Quebec Cinema Awards	Beans	Anne-Marie Gélinas	
2022; 24th Quebec Cinema Awards	Maria Chapdelaine	Pierre Even, Sylvain Proulx	
2022; 24th Quebec Cinema Awards	Norbourg	Réal Chabot	
2022; 24th Quebec Cinema Awards	Without Havana (Sin la Habana)	Ménaïc Raoul, Gabrielle Tougas-Fréchette	
2023; 25th Quebec Cinema Awards
2023; 25th Quebec Cinema Awards	Viking	Luc Déry, Kim McCraw	
2023; 25th Quebec Cinema Awards	Babysitter	Martin Paul-Hus, Catherine Léger, Pierre-Marcel Blanchot, Fabrice Lambot	
2023; 25th Quebec Cinema Awards	The Dishwasher (Le plongeur)	Marie-Claude Poulin	
2023; 25th Quebec Cinema Awards	Falcon Lake	Nancy Grant, Sylvain Corbeil, Dany Boon, Jalil Lespert, Julien Deris, David Gauquié, Jean-Luc Ormières	
2023; 25th Quebec Cinema Awards	Family Game (Arseneault et fils)	Stéphanie Morissette, Charles Stéphane Roy	
2023; 25th Quebec Cinema Awards	Noemie Says Yes (Noémie dit oui)	Patricia Bergeron	
2023; 25th Quebec Cinema Awards	Red Rooms (Les chambres rouges)	Dominique Dussault	
2024; 26th Quebec Cinema Awards
2024; 26th Quebec Cinema Awards	Humanist Vampire Seeking Consenting Suicidal Person (Vampire humaniste cherche suicidaire consentant)	Jeanne-Marie Poulain, Line Sander Egede	
2024; 26th Quebec Cinema Awards	1995	Marie-Claude Poulin	
2024; 26th Quebec Cinema Awards	Ababooned (Ababouiné)	Roger Frappier, Louis Laverdière, Linda Pinet	
2024; 26th Quebec Cinema Awards	The Nature of Love (Simple comme Sylvain)	Sylvain Corbeil, Nancy Grant, Elisha Karmitz, Nathanaël Karmitz	
2024; 26th Quebec Cinema Awards	Richelieu	Geneviève Gosselin-G.	
2024; 26th Quebec Cinema Awards	Ru	André Dupuy, Marie-Alexandra Forget	
2024; 26th Quebec Cinema Awards	Solo	Étienne Hansez	
2025; 27th Quebec Cinema Awards
2025; 27th Quebec Cinema Awards	Universal Language (Une langue universelle)	Sylvain Corbeil	
2025; 27th Quebec Cinema Awards	Blue Sky Jo (La petite et le vieux)	Sonia Despars, Marc Biron	
2025; 27th Quebec Cinema Awards	Miss Boots (Mlle Bottine)	Antonello Cozzolino, Brigitte Léveillé, Dominic James	
2025; 27th Quebec Cinema Awards	Peak Everything (Amour apocalypse)	Sylvain Corbeil	
2025; 27th Quebec Cinema Awards	Shepherds (Bergers)	Luc Déry, Kim McCraw, Élaine Hébert, Caroline Bonmarchand, Xenia Sulyma	
2025; 27th Quebec Cinema Awards	Two Women (Deux femmes en or)	Martin Paul-Hus, Catherine Léger	
2025; 27th Quebec Cinema Awards	Who by Fire (Comme le feu)	Galilé Marion-Gauvin, Thomas Ordonneau	

== Multiple wins and nominations ==
=== Multiple wins ===
Wins	Producer
7	Luc Déry
6	Kim McCraw
3	Xavier Dolan
2	Sylvain Corbeil
2	Nancy Grant
2	Pierre Even
2	Nicole Robert
2	Luc Vandal

=== Three or more nominations ===
Nominations	Producer
14	Luc Déry
13	Kim McCraw
12	Sylvain Corbeil
11	Roger Frappier
11	Nancy Grant
10	Luc Vandal
6	Lyse Lafontaine
6	Bernadette Payeur
6	Nicole Robert
5	Xavier Dolan
4	Nathanaël Karmitz
4	Daniel Louis
4	Stéphanie Morisette
4	Denise Robert
3	Marc Daigle
3	Lorraine Dufour
3	Pierre Even
3	Étienne Hansez
3	Christian Larouche
3	Galilé Marion-Gauvin
3	Marie-Claude Poulin
3	André Rouleau

== See also ==
- Canadian Screen Award for Best Motion Picture
