= Lorraine Dufour =

Canadian film editor

- Born: 1950 (age 74–75); Montreal, Quebec, Canada
- Occupations: Film editor; film producer; screenwriter
- Years active: 1977–present
- Notable work: Post Mortem (1999); The Negro (2002); Bad Seeds (2016)

Lorraine Dufour (born 1950) is a Canadian film editor and producer. She has received Canadian Screen Award and Prix Iris nominations and wins for films like Post Mortem, The Negro, and Bad Seeds, and she and her longtime collaborator Robert Morin are the co-founders of Coop Vidéo de Montréal.

== Biography ==
Lorraine Dufour was born in 1950 in Montreal. She, Robert Morin, and Jean-Pierre St-Louis were part of the trio behind the documenteur, a subgenre "mixing the false fiction and mockumentary". She and Morin co-founded Coop Vidéo de Montréal in 1977, and the two also founded Morin-Dufour Vidéo Inc. In 1980, the two directed Gus est encore dans l’armée, a short film about a Canadian Armed Forces soldier and his newfound attraction to another male soldier. In 1991, the two won the 1st Canada Council Bell Canada Award. she was also known to be the "guiding spirit of Coop Vidéo". Georges Privet called Dufour the Coop Vidéo de Montréal's "driving force" and said that "it is impossible to talk about [her longtime collaborator] Robert Morin without mentioning Lorraine Dufour".

She was nominated for the Genie Award for Best Motion Picture at the 13th Genie Awards for Requiem for a Handsome Bastard. She won the Jutra Award for Best Film and Jutra Award for Best Editing at the 2nd Jutra Awards and received a nomination for the Genie Award for Best Motion Picture at the 20th Genie Awards for Post Mortem. She won the Jutra Award for Best Editing at the 5th Jutra Awards and was nominated for the Genie Award for Best Achievement in Editing at the 23rd Genie Awards for The Negro, She was nominated for the Jutra Award for Best Editing at the 6th Jutra Awards for Gaz Bar Blues. She was nominated for the Genie Award for Best Motion Picture and the Prix Iris Public Prize for Bad Seeds.

== Filmography ==
- Même mort il faut s’organiser (1977, co-director)
- Le voleur vit en enfer (1984, co-director)
- Requiem for a Handsome Bastard (1993, editor)
- Windigo (1994, editor)
- Whoever Dies, Dies in Pain (1998, editor)
- Post Mortem (1999, producer and editor)
- Marriages (2001, editor)
- The Negro (2002, editor)
- Gaz Bar Blues (2003, producer and editor)
- May God Bless America (2006, editor)
- Deliver Me (2006, executive producer)
- Dans les villes (2006, producer)
- The Timekeeper (2009, co-screenplay)
- The Valley of Tears (2012, editor)
- Bad Seeds (2016, co-producer)

== Awards and nominations ==
Year	Title	Award	Result	Ref.
1992	Requiem for a Handsome Bastard	Genie Award for Best Motion Picture (with Nicole Robert)	Nominated	
2000	Post Mortem	Genie Award for Best Motion Picture	Nominated	
2000	Post Mortem	Jutra Award for Best Film (with Coop Vidéo de Montréal)	Won	
2000	Post Mortem	Jutra Award for Best Editing	Won	
2003	The Negro	Genie Award for Best Achievement in Editing (with George Browne)	Nominated	
2003	The Negro	Jutra Award for Best Editing	Won	
2004	Gaz Bar Blues	Jutra Award for Best Editing	Nominated	
2016	Bad Seeds	Genie Award for Best Motion Picture (with Luc Vandal)	Nominated	
2017	Bad Seeds	Prix Iris Public Prize (with Louis Bélanger and Luc Vandal)	Nominated	
