= Jean-Pierre St-Louis =

Canadian cinematographer (1951–2020)

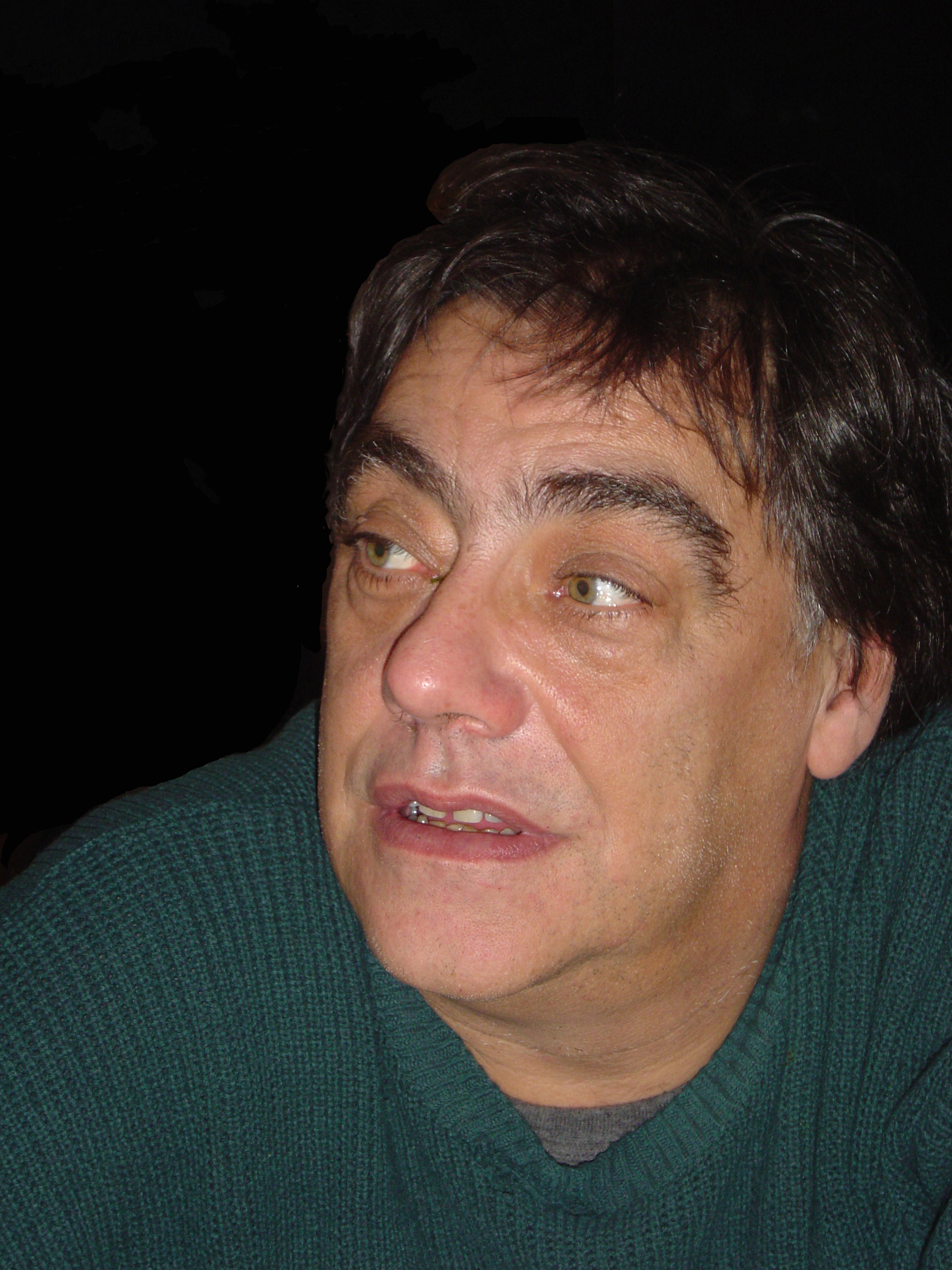
- Jean-Pierre St-Louis in 2005
- Born: 1951; Mont-Tremblant, Quebec, Canada
- Died: 9 April 2020 (aged 68–69); Montreal, Quebec, Canada
- Occupation(s): Cinematographer; Videographer

Jean-Pierre St-Louis (1951 – 9 April 2020) was a Canadian cinematographer and videographer.

== Biography ==
St-Louis began his feature film career in 1987 alongside Robert Morin and Lorraine Dufour as a cinematographer for Tristesse modèle réduit. He collaborated in numerous other films throughout his career. Between 1977 and 1991, he directed several short-length and medium-length films thanks to grants from the Canada Council, such as Fait divers : elle remplace son mari par une T.V. (1982), Carapace: autoportrait d’un chanteur inconnu (1984), and Zapping : une histoire de salon (1991).

== Filmography ==
- Scale-Model Sadness (Tristesse modèle réduit) - 1987
- Requiem for a Handsome Bastard (Requiem pour un beau sans-coeur) - 1992
- Windigo - 1994
- Whoever Dies, Dies in Pain (Quiconque meurt, meurt à douleur) - 1997
- Les siamoises - 1998
- Post Mortem - 1999
- La Vie la vie - 2001
- Operation Cobra (Opération cobra) - 2001
- The Negro (Le nèg') - 2002
- 8:17 p.m. Darling Street (20h17 rue Darling) - 2003
- Gaz Bar Blues - 2003
- Naked Josh - 2004
- On the Verge of a Fever (Le Goût des jeunes filles) - 2004
- May God Bless America (Que Dieu bénisse l'Amérique) - 2004
- Imitation - 2005
- Ten Days to Victory - 2005
- The Genius of Crime (Le génie du crime) - 2006
- Pax Americana and the Weaponization of Space - 2007
- Naufrages - 2009
- Ladies in Blue (Les Dames en bleu) - 2009
- The Four Soldiers (Les Quatre Soldats) - 2013
- The Diary of an Old Man (Journal d'un vieil homme) - 2015
- A Place to Live (Pour vivre ici) - 2018

== Distinctions ==
- Prix Gémeaux (2000)
- Prix Gémeaux (2002)
- Hommage AFC (2003)
