= 3 Indian Tales =

- Film poster
- French: 3 histoires d'indiens
- Directed by: Robert Morin
- Written by: Robert Morin
- Produced by: Robert Morin; Virginie Dubois
- Starring: Shayne Brazeau; Erik Papatie; Shandy-Ève Grant; Marie-Claude Penosway; Alicia Papatie-Pien
- Cinematography: Robert Morin
- Edited by: Michel Giroux
- Production company: Coop Vidéo de Montréal
- Release date: February 2014
- Running time: 71 minutes
- Country: Canada
- Language: French

3 Indian Tales (French: 3 histoires d'indiens) is a Canadian docufiction film, directed by Robert Morin and released in 2014.

Using a cast of non-professional actors, the film tells three stories of First Nations youth: Erik wants to open a community television station, Shayne listens to classical music as he travels to a mining site, Shandy-Ève and Marie-Claude pray to Saint Kateri Tekakwitha. Morin made the film with the goal of encouraging viewers to reconsider their prejudices of First Nations by dramatizing the stories of real youth who are not falling into the stereotypes, but instead are engaged and ambitious and living with passion and purpose. He shot the film with indigenous youth from the Kitcisakik and Lac-Simon reserves in the Abitibi-Témiscamingue region of Quebec.

The film premiered at the 2014 Berlin Film Festival.

== Awards ==
The film received five Prix Jutra nominations at the 17th Jutra Awards, for Best Film, Best Director (Morin), Best Screenplay (Morin), Best Sound (Morin, Bruno Bélanger, Louis Collin, Bernard Gariépy Strobl) and Best Editing (Michel Giroux).

It was shortlisted for the Prix collégial du cinéma québécois in 2015.
