= Yes Sir! Madame... =

1994 Canadian satirical film

- Directed by: Robert Morin
- Written by: Robert Morin
- Produced by: Lorraine Dufour; Robert Morin
- Starring: Robert Morin
- Cinematography: Robert Morin
- Edited by: Robert Morin
- Production companies: Coop Vidéo de Montréal; Morin Dufour Production
- Distributed by: Vidéographe
- Release date: November 18, 1994 (Montreal)
- Running time: 73 minutes
- Country: Canada
- Languages: English; French

Yes Sir! Madame... is a Canadian satirical film, directed by Robert Morin and released in 1994. The film is essentially a philosophical monologue on identity performed entirely by Morin in the character of Earl Tremblay, a former politician who is filming his own testimony about the duality of being the son of a French Canadian father and an English Canadian mother, thus both belonging and feeling like an outsider to both of Canada's primary language communities.

The film blended Morin's early work as a video artist with his early 1990s forays into full-length narrative filmmaking.

The film premiered on November 18, 1994, at Troisième fenêtre, a video art exhibition in Montreal, before going into wider release in 1995.

A digitally restored version of the film was screened at the Fantasia Film Festival in 2021.
