= Bad Seeds (2016 film) =

- Les Mauvaises herbes
- Directed by: Louis Bélanger
- Written by: Louis Bélanger; Alexis Martin
- Produced by: Lorraine Dufour; Luc Vandal
- Starring: Alexis Martin; Luc Picard; Gilles Renaud; Emmanuelle Lussier-Martinez
- Cinematography: Pierre Mignot
- Edited by: Claude Palardy
- Music by: Guy Bélanger
- Release date: 11 March 2016
- Running time: 97 minutes
- Country: Canada
- Language: French

Bad Seeds (French: Les Mauvaises herbes) is a Canadian comedy film, directed by Louis Bélanger and released in 2016.

The film stars Alexis Martin as Jacques, a struggling actor from Montreal who is forced to flee the city because of his unpaid gambling debts to a loan shark (Luc Picard), and ends up a partner with Simon (Gilles Renaud) and Francesca (Emmanuelle Lussier-Martinez) in a marijuana farm.

The film's cast also includes Myriam Côté, Patrick Hivon, Stéphane Jacques, Yves Bélanger, Bénédicte Décary, François Papineau, Sylvio Archambault and Gary Boudreault.

== Plot summary ==
Jacques Sauvageau, an actor addicted to compulsive gambling and wanted for debt, impulsively flees Montreal in the dead of winter and ends up in a remote village. He is taken in by Simon Boulerice, a recluse who grows marijuana in his barn. Boulerice, who needs help with his operation, lets Sauvageau in on the secret and keeps him in semi-captivity until they reach an agreement: his help to Boulerice will allow Sauvageau to pay off his debts.

Soon, an electric meter reader named Francesca arrives on the job and discovers the illegal grow operation. Boulerice takes her in for a while, hoping to strike a mutually beneficial deal, much like he did with Sauvageau. The crop soon reaches maturity, and Boulerice plans to leave his son, whom he hasn't seen in 18 years, a wooded plot of land he acquired with the proceeds of his illegal trade. He usually sells his harvest to a local motorcycle club.

Patenaude, the shylock searching for Sauvageau, discovered that the latter was hiding at Boulerice's house. The actor had been seen with Boulerice's snowmobile at the bar where he had gone to indulge his gambling addiction. He arrived at the barn and threatened Boulerice, discovered Sauvageau, but Francesca knocked him unconscious while the three partners built him an improvised prison. Sauvageau tried to settle his debt with the shylock, who refused to listen. One night, Sauvageau managed to escape his cell, but while fleeing on Boulerice's snowmobile, he drove into a poorly frozen marsh and died.

The shylock wrecked the cannabis grow operation before leaving, but Francesca's girlfriend, Nancy, rallied some friends from college who helped repair the damage. Meanwhile, Boulerice died of a heart attack, and Sauvageau finalized the lucrative deal with the bikers, soon delivering the deeds to Boulerice's son for the wooded land his father had bequeathed to him.

== Cast ==
- Alexis Martin as Jacques Sauvageau
- Gilles Renaud as Simon Boulerice
- Emmanuelle Lussier Martinez as Francesca
- Mimi Côté as Nancy (as Myriam Côté)
- Gary Boudreault as Deux-temps
- François Papineau as Compte
- Stéphane F. Jacques as Tony (as Stéphane Jacques)
- Sylvio Archambault as Balloune

== Accolades ==
The film garnered four nominations at the 5th Canadian Screen Awards in 2017, including Best Motion Picture.

Award	Date of ceremony	Category	Recipient(s)	Result	Ref(s)
Canadian Screen Awards	12 March 2017	Best Motion Picture	Luc Vandal, Lorraine Dufour	Nominated	
Canadian Screen Awards	12 March 2017	Best Editing	Claude Palardy	Nominated	
Canadian Screen Awards	12 March 2017	Best Art Direction / Production Design	André-Line Beauparlant	Nominated	
Canadian Screen Awards	12 March 2017	Best Overall Sound	Marcel Chouinard, Philippe Lavigne, Stéphane Bergeron, Shaun-Nicholas Gallagher, Louis Collin	Nominated	
Prix collégial du cinéma québécois	2017	Best Film	Bad Seeds	Nominated	
Prix Iris	4 June 2017	Best Film	Luc Vandal, Lorraine Dufour	Nominated	
Prix Iris	4 June 2017	Best Director	Louis Bélanger	Nominated	
Prix Iris	4 June 2017	Best Screenplay	Louis Bélanger, Alexis Martin	Won	
Prix Iris	4 June 2017	Best Supporting Actress	Emmanuelle Lussier-Martinez	Nominated	
Prix Iris	4 June 2017	Best Supporting Actor	Luc Picard	Won	
Prix Iris	4 June 2017	Best Casting	Emanuelle Beaugrand-Champagne, Nathalie Boutrie	Nominated	
Prix Iris	4 June 2017	Best Music	Guy Bélanger	Nominated	
Prix Iris	4 June 2017	Best Costume Design	Sophie Lefebvre	Nominated	
Prix Iris	4 June 2017	Public Prize	Louis Bélanger	Nominated	
