= Stardom =

- Directed by: Denys Arcand
- Written by: J.Jacob Potashnik; Denys Arcand
- Starring: Jessica Paré; Dan Aykroyd
- Edited by: Isabelle Dedieu
- Music by: François Dompierre
- Production companies: Alliance Atlantis; Serendipity Point Films; Cinémaginaire Inc.; Ciné B
- Distributed by: Alliance Atlantis Releasing (Canada); Pathé Distribution (France)
- Release date: May 17, 2000
- Running time: 100 minutes
- Countries: Canada; France
- Languages: English; French
- Budget: $6.7 million
- Box office: $150,000

Stardom is a 2000 Canadian comedy-drama film directed by Denys Arcand and written by J.Jacob Potashnik and Arcand. It stars Jessica Paré and Dan Aykroyd. It tells the story of a young girl who tries to cope with her rise to stardom after being discovered by a fashion agency. The film was screened out of competition at the 2000 Cannes Film Festival.

Arcand cited his later film Days of Darkness (2007) as similar to Stardom, though Days of Darkness was ostensibly a sequel to his other films The Decline of the American Empire (1986) and The Barbarian Invasions (2003).

== Cast ==
- Jessica Paré - Tina Menzhal
- Victoria Snow - Ann Menzhal, Tina's Mother
- Jessica Mackenzie - Tina's Sister
- Macha Grenon - Model Agency Owner
- Jo Vannicola - Rosie
- Charles Berling - Philippe Gascon
- Sophie Lorain - Italasia Reporter
- Dan Aykroyd - Barry Levine
- Frank Langella - Blaine De Castillon
- Thomas Gibson - Renny Ohayon
- Gregory Calpakis - Steve Bourque
- Paul Reynolds - Nigel Pope
- Camilla Rutherford - Toni Steward
- Robert Lepage - Bruce Taylor
- François Berléand - Nigel Pope's associate
- Thibault de Montalembert - French Intellectual
- Patrick Huard - Montreal Talkshow Host
- Maggie Steed - British Fashion Reporter
- Patrick Poivre d'Arvor - French TV Anchorman
- Philippe Caroit - French TV Journalist
