= Windigo (film) =

- Directed by: Robert Morin
- Written by: Robert Morin
- Based on: Heart of Darkness by Joseph Conrad
- Produced by: Nicole Robert
- Starring: Donald Morin; Guy Nadon; Yvon Leroux; Richard Kistabish; Serge Houde
- Cinematography: James Gray; Jean-Pierre St-Louis
- Edited by: Lorraine Dufour
- Music by: Bertrand Chénier
- Production company: Lux Films
- Distributed by: Allegro Films Distribution
- Release date: September 1994 (TIFF)
- Running time: 97 minutes
- Country: Canada
- Language: French

Windigo is a Canadian dramatic film directed by Robert Morin and released in 1994. The screenplay was based, in part, on Joseph Conrad's novel Heart of Darkness.

== Plot ==
The film centres on a First Nations group in rural northern Quebec who have declared independence from Canada, and a journalist from Montreal who travels to their territory to cover the story.

== Cast ==
The cast includes Donald Morin, Guy Nadon, Yvon Leroux, Richard Kistabish and Serge Houde.

== Release and reception ==
The film premiered at the 1994 Toronto International Film Festival, where it received an honorable mention from the jury for the Best Canadian Film award. It was commercially released in November 1994.

The film was one of six finalists for the Rendez-vous du cinéma québécois's Prix L.-E. Ouimet-Molson in 1995.
