= The Barbarian Invasions =

2003 film by Denys Arcand

- Original film poster
- French: Les Invasions barbares
- Directed by: Denys Arcand
- Written by: Denys Arcand
- Produced by: Daniel Louis; Denise Robert
- Starring: Rémy Girard; Stéphane Rousseau; Dorothée Berryman; Louise Portal; Marie-Josée Croze; Marina Hands
- Cinematography: Guy Dufaux
- Edited by: Isabelle Dedieu
- Music by: Pierre Aviat
- Production companies: Canal+ Telefilm Canada
- Distributed by: Pyramide Distribution (France); Alliance Atlantis Vivafilm (Canada)
- Release dates: 21 May 2003 (Cannes); 24 September 2003
- Running time: 99 minutes
- Countries: Canada; France
- Languages: French; English
- Budget: US$5 million
- Box office: US$34.9 million

The Barbarian Invasions (French: Les Invasions barbares) is a 2003 sex comedy-drama film written and directed by Denys Arcand and starring Rémy Girard, Stéphane Rousseau and Marie-Josée Croze. The film is a sequel to Arcand's 1986 film The Decline of the American Empire, continuing the story of the character Rémy, a womanizing history professor now terminally ill with cancer.

The sequel was a result of Arcand's longtime desire to make a film about a character close to death, also incorporating a response to the September 11 attacks of 2001. It was produced by companies from both Canada and France, and shot mainly in Montreal, also employing a former hospital and property near Lake Memphremagog.

The film received a positive response from critics and became one of Arcand's biggest financial successes. It was the first Canadian film to win the Academy Award for Best Foreign Language Film, at the 76th Academy Awards in 2004. It won awards at the 2003 Cannes Film Festival, six Genie Awards, including Best Motion Picture, and three César Awards, including Best Film. The Barbarian Invasions was followed by the thematically related Days of Darkness in 2007 and The Fall of the American Empire in 2018.

== Plot ==
Seventeen years after the events of The Decline of the American Empire, Sébastien is enjoying a successful career in quantitative finance in London when he receives a call from his mother, Louise, that his father and Louise's ex-husband Rémy is terminally ill with cancer. Sébastien is not enthused about seeing Rémy, whom he blames for breaking up the family with his many adulteries. Rémy and his friends of the older generation are still largely social-democrats and proponents of Quebec nationalism. Rémy does not like Sébastien's career, lack of reading and fondness for video games.

The father and son travel to the U.S. state of Vermont to briefly receive medical care before returning to the overcrowded and disorganized Quebec hospital. Sébastien attempts to bribe hospital administration for better care, and calls Rémy's old friends about a possible visit. Upon hearing heroin is "800%" more effective than morphine, he tracks some down for Rémy from a drug addict, Nathalie.

Meanwhile, Rémy is reunited with his friends, including Pierre, Dominique, Claude and Diane, Nathalie's mother, and they share a conversation on their old sex drive and the gradual decline of their vitality. Diane is concerned for Nathalie, while Rémy, a history professor, lectures the hospital chaplain Constance on the relative peace of the 20th century compared to past centuries. At the same time, another scholar describes the September 11 attacks as historically small except as a possible beginning of modern barbarian invasions. After Rémy and his friends retreat to the countryside, they speak of their devotion to constantly evolving -isms. Rémy dies in the company of his friends and Sébastien, after a heroin injection from Nathalie, whom Rémy calls his guardian angel.

== Cast ==
- Rémy Girard as Rémy
- Stéphane Rousseau as Sébastien
- Dorothée Berryman as Louise
- Louise Portal as Diane
- Marie-Josée Croze as Nathalie (Diane's daughter)
- Marina Hands as Gaëlle
- Dominique Michel as Dominique
- Pierre Curzi as Pierre
- Yves Jacques as Claude
- Isabelle Blais as Sylvaine
- Toni Cecchinato as Alessandro
- Sophie Lorain as First Lover
- Mitsou Gélinas as Ghislaine
- Micheline Lanctôt as Nurse Carole
- Johanne-Marie Tremblay as Sister Constance
- Roy Dupuis as Narcotics Officer Gilles Levac
- Lise Roy as Mme. Joncas-Pelletier

== Production ==
=== Development ===
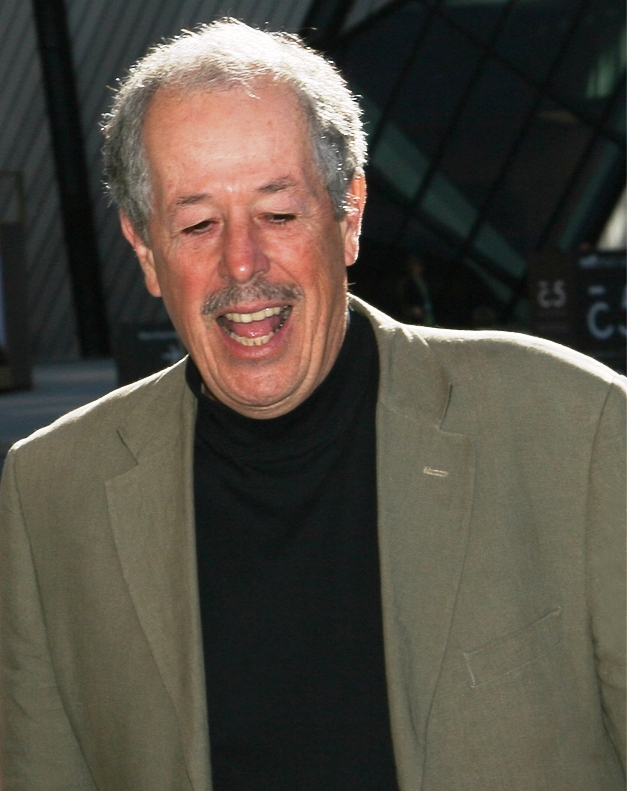
Director Denys Arcand developed the idea for The Barbarian Invasions out of a fascination with death and theories on the September 11 attacks.

Denys Arcand, who wrote and directed the successful French Canadian film The Decline of the American Empire (1986), developed the idea of returning to the characters years later due to a fascination with death and an idea of having a character who is expecting to die. Part of his interest in the subject matter related to both of his parents dying of cancer. He had tried to write screenplays about non-Decline characters going to die for 20 years prior to The Barbarian Invasions, originally pitching the idea to the Canadian Broadcasting Corporation but having difficulty with the subject matter being overly sentimental. He finally decided to try the story with characters from The Decline of the American Empire because of his fondness for its cast members. There are also characters from Arcand's 1989 film Jesus of Montreal in the film.

The September 11 attacks of 2001 occurred when Arcand was nearly finished his screenplay, and gave new impetus to Arcand's ideas of "the decline of the American Empire." Arcand believed the attack represented the first of what would be many foreign attacks on the U.S. Arcand also referred to himself as "post-isms", and incorporated this discussion into the film.

Another statement he tried to make with his film was that heroin could be legalized for terminally ill patients in Canada, claiming it already is in England. Author Susan C. Boyd wrote that, despite what the film portrays, heroin has been legal in Canadian palliative care since 1984. To research how his character would find heroin, Arcand contacted the Royal Canadian Mounted Police and met with them in an interrogation room, resembling the one in the final film. He claimed the RCMP gave him the cellphone number of a Montreal detective, and when he called it, he heard shouting from a police raid on the Hells Angels, which resulted in the arrest of Maurice Boucher.

The film was produced by both Canadian and French companies, including Telefilm Canada, Société Radio-Canada and Canal+. The budget was $6 million.

=== Casting ===
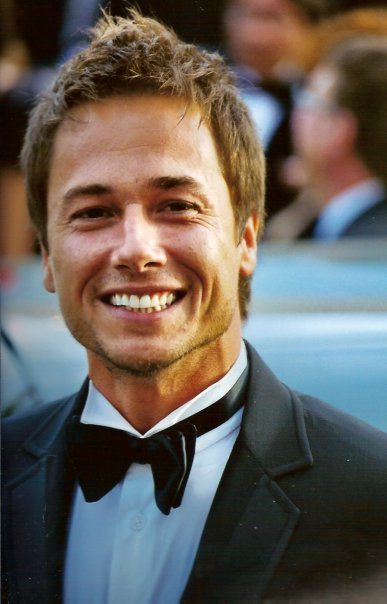
Comedian Stéphane Rousseau was newly cast as Sébastien and won the Genie Award for Best Supporting Actor for the role.

The cast members from the previous film, including Dorothee Berryman, Louise Portal, Dominique Michel, Pierre Curzi and Yves Jacques, were easy to secure for the sequel. New to the cast was Marie-Josée Croze, who was selected by Arcand after starring in the Canadian films Maelstrom (2000) and Ararat (2002). She found Arcand allowed her freedom in how she interpreted her role. In The Decline of the American Empire, Croze's character Nathalie is played by child actress Ariane Frédérique.

Stéphane Rousseau, better known in Quebec as a stand-up comedian than an actor, was cast as Sébastien, after Dominique Michel urged Arcand to allow Rousseau to audition. Arcand explained he felt Rousseau had the "authority" the other actors who auditioned did not, though Rousseau was surprised to get the part as he felt his character was colder and more of an intellectual than he was. Rousseau's mother had died of cancer when he was a child, and he had fought with his father, later incorporating that experience into his performance.

=== Filming ===
The film was shot over 50 days, beginning in September 2002 and finishing in November. The bulk of the film was shot in Montreal, with some scenes filmed in London. Footage from the World Trade Center attack shot by a Quebec architect and acquired by Radio-Canada was also used.

For the hospital scenes, the cast and crew employed Lachine General Hospital, an unused former hospital in Lachine, Quebec. Cinematographer Guy Dufaux found these scenes difficult to make interesting and realistic at the same time, and decided on more lighting for later scenes when the film's mood brightens, while using fluorescent fixtures and reflecting the former hospital's green painting to shoot the early scenes. As with the first film, scenes were filmed near Lake Memphremagog. Most of the film was shot using a Steadicam.

== Release ==
News that Arcand was working on a sequel to his 1986 film was received with a skeptical and negative response from critics. The film was screened at the 2003 Cannes Film Festival in May, where it received a 22-minute standing ovation, with distribution to 30 countries assured by the time Arcand received his Best Screenplay award. It was afterwards selected to open the gala at the 2003 Toronto International Film Festival in September, and also opened the Vancouver International Film Festival that month. The film began playing in Quebec theatres in May and ran for months, with its Canadian distributor being Alliance Films. It opened across Canada on 21 November.

After Cannes, rights were sold to Miramax for distribution of the film in the United States. It opened in New York and Los Angeles on 21 November. In France, the film was available on 450 screens at one time, the most for a Quebec film ever.

== Reception ==
=== Box office ===
The film's box office performance at Quebec theatres between its opening in May 2003 and the fall was considered good. By December, its initial release across Canada made $5.9 million.

In France, it grossed the equivalent of US$8 million. According to Box Office Mojo, the film finished its run on 3 June 2004 after grossing $8,544,975 in North America and $18,379,681 in other territories, for a worldwide total of $26,924,656. It was one of Arcand's biggest box office successes.

=== Critical reception ===
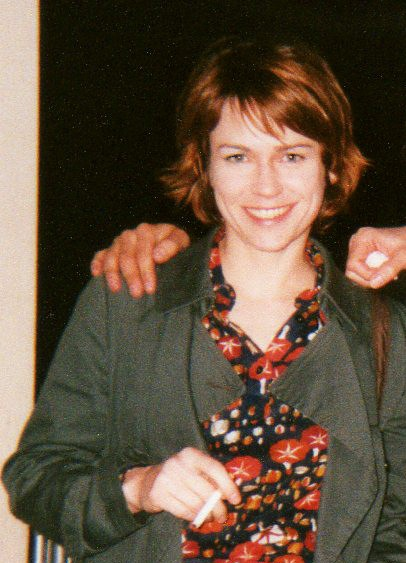
Marie-Josée Croze received positive reviews for her performance, as well as the Cannes Best Actress Award and Genie Award for Best Supporting Actress.

The Barbarian Invasions has received positive reviews from numerous critics. Review aggregator Rotten Tomatoes reports an 81% approval rating based on 134 reviews, with an average rating of 7.2/10. Metacritic reports that the film has an average score of 70 out of 100, based on 34 critics, indicating "generally favorable reviews".

In Canada, Maclean's critic Brian D. Johnson called it not only satirical but "a moving elegy to a generation that defined modern Quebec and has seen its passions rendered obsolete". Liam Lacey wrote in The Globe and Mail that the film is "upbeat and wryly positive, or at least as much as you could expect from a film that condemns the Quebec hospital system and features a death by cancer as its central theme". The film drew general attention for its criticism of Quebec's health care system. Peter Howell wrote in The Toronto Star that "It's the depth of emotions Arcand summons for his characters, and the way this superb ensemble cast bring them so vividly to life, that make The Barbarian Invasions a film not just to see, but to welcome home".

Roger Ebert of the Chicago Sun-Times gave the movie four stars and called it "a movie with brains, indignation, irony and idealism". A. O. Scott of The New York Times wrote "what makes The Barbarian Invasions much more than a facile exercise in generational conflict is that Denys Arcand, who wrote and directed it, has a sense of history that is as acute as it is playful", adding "The rapprochement between Remy and Sebastien is beautiful to watch" and Marie-Josée Croze's "spooky, melancholy intensity darkens the mood of buoyant sentimentality". Entertainment Weekly's Owen Gleiberman gave the film a B−, noting Rémy's hedonism. David Denby of The New Yorker gave credit to Stéphane Rousseau for "a fascinatingly minimal performance". Jonathan Romney of The Independent wrote "The film has its pros and cons, but you can't fault it for ambition: it not only muses on life and death, but also undertakes fairly comprehensive philosophical soundings of the way the world is today". Romney added Croze "has simply the most nuanced presence here: thoughtful, introspective, with a reassuring warmth and lack of cartoonishness". Peter Bradshaw, writing for The Guardian, disdained the movie, calling it "grotesquely overpraised", "shot through with middlebrow sophistication, boorish cynicism, unfunny satire, a dash of fatuous anti-Americanism and unthinkingly reactionary sexual politics". English Professor Peter Brunette wrote "its analysis of this state of affairs is all too often annoyingly rhetorical and, finally, altogether too facile".

In 2004, the Toronto International Film Festival ranked the film tenth in the Top 10 Canadian Films of All Time. David Lawrence Pike criticized the use of the World Trade Center footage as exploitative, but said despite "the crudeness and vulgarity", the film had a "particular brilliance".

=== Accolades ===
The Barbarian Invasions is considered historically significant as the first Canadian film to win the Academy Award for Best Foreign Language Film. Canadian historian George Melnyk interpreted it as a sign that "Canadian cinema has come of global age", also pointing to Atanarjuat: The Fast Runner (2001) winning the Camera d'Or at Cannes.

Marie-Josée Croze's honour for Best Actress at the 2003 Cannes Film Festival was considered unlikely. She was not present to accept the award. The film's victory at France's national César Awards was also considered a surprise, since it is mainly a Quebec film. It received the most nominations at the 24th Genie Awards.

Award	Date of ceremony	Category	Recipient(s)	Result	Ref(s)
Academy Awards	29 February 2004	Best Original Screenplay	Denys Arcand	Nominated	
Academy Awards	29 February 2004	Best Foreign Language Film	Canada	Won	
BAFTA Awards	15 February 2004	Film Not in the English Language	Canada	Nominated	
BAFTA Awards	15 February 2004	Best Original Screenplay	Denys Arcand	Nominated	
Bangkok International Film Festival	22 January–2 February 2004	Best Film	Denys Arcand	Won	
Cannes Film Festival	14–25 May 2003	Best Screenplay	Denys Arcand	Won	
Cannes Film Festival	14–25 May 2003	Best Actress	Marie-Josée Croze	Won	
César Awards	21 February 2004	Best Film	Denys Arcand	Won	
César Awards	21 February 2004	Best Director	Denys Arcand	Won	
César Awards	21 February 2004	Best Original Screenplay or Adaptation	Denys Arcand	Won	
César Awards	21 February 2004	Most Promising Actress	Marie-Josée Croze	Nominated	
Critics' Choice Awards	10 January 2004	Best Foreign Language Film	Denys Arcand	Won	
David di Donatello Awards	2004	Best Foreign Film	Denys Arcand	Won	
European Film Awards	6 December 2003	Best Non-European Film	Denys Arcand	Won	
Genie Awards	1 May 2004	Best Motion Picture	Denise Robert, Daniel Louis and Fabienne Vonier	Won	
Genie Awards	1 May 2004	Best Direction	Denys Arcand	Won	
Genie Awards	1 May 2004	Best Actor	Rémy Girard	Won	
Genie Awards	1 May 2004	Best Supporting Actor	Stéphane Rousseau	Won	
Genie Awards	1 May 2004	Best Supporting Actress	Marie-Josée Croze	Won	
Genie Awards	1 May 2004	Best Original Screenplay	Denys Arcand	Won	
Genie Awards	1 May 2004	Best Editing	Isabelle Dedieu	Nominated	
Genie Awards	1 May 2004	Best Sound	Michel Descombes, Gavin Fernandes and Patrick Rousseau	Nominated	
Genie Awards	1 May 2004	Best Sound Editing	Marie-Claude Gagné, Diane Boucher, Jérôme Décarie, Claire Pochon and Jean-Philippe Savard	Nominated	
Golden Globes	25 January 2004	Best Foreign Language Film	The Barbarian Invasions	Nominated	
Jutra Awards	22 February 2004	Best Film	Denise Robert and Daniel Louis	Won	
Jutra Awards	22 February 2004	Best Direction	Denys Arcand	Won	
Jutra Awards	22 February 2004	Best Screenplay	Denys Arcand	Won	
Jutra Awards	22 February 2004	Best Actor	Rémy Girard	Nominated	
Jutra Awards	22 February 2004	Best Actress	Marie-Josée Croze	Won	
Jutra Awards	22 February 2004	Best Supporting Actor	Pierre Curzi	Nominated	
Jutra Awards	22 February 2004	Best Supporting Actress	Dorothée Berryman	Nominated	
Jutra Awards	22 February 2004	Best Art Direction	Normand Sarazin	Won	
Jutra Awards	22 February 2004	Best Cinematography	Guy Dufaux	Nominated	
Jutra Awards	22 February 2004	Best Editing	Isabelle Dedieu	Nominated	
Jutra Awards	22 February 2004	Best Sound	Patrick Rousseau, Michel Descombes, Gavin Fernandes and Marie-Claude Gagné	Nominated	
Jutra Awards	22 February 2004	Best Make-Up	Evelyne Byot and Diane Simard	Nominated	
Jutra Awards	22 February 2004	Special Jutra	Denys Arcand	Won	
Lumière Awards	17 February 2004	Best French-Language Film	Denys Arcand	Won	
National Board of Review	December 2003	Best Foreign Language Film	The Barbarian Invasions	Won	
National Board of Review	December 2003	Top Foreign Films	The Barbarian Invasions	Won	
Toronto Film Critics Association	17 December 2003	Best Screenplay	Denys Arcand	Won (Note: Shared with Sofia Coppola for Lost in Translation)	
Toronto International Film Festival	4–13 September 2003	Best Canadian Feature Film	Denys Arcand	Won	
Vancouver Film Critics Circle	2 February 2004	Best Canadian Feature Film	The Barbarian Invasions	Won	
Vancouver Film Critics Circle	2 February 2004	Best Canadian Director	Denys Arcand	Won	
Vancouver Film Critics Circle	2 February 2004	Best Actor in a Canadian Film	Rémy Girard	Nominated	
Vancouver Film Critics Circle	2 February 2004	Best Actress in a Canadian Film	Marie-Josée Croze	Nominated	
Vancouver Film Critics Circle	2 February 2004	Best Supporting Actor in a Canadian Film	Stéphane Rousseau	Nominated	

== Legacy ==
In 2007, Arcand's film Days of Darkness was released. While considered part of a loose trilogy following The Decline of the American Empire and The Barbarian Invasions, Arcand acknowledged in a 2007 interview Days of Darkness had more similarities to his less successful 2000 film Stardom. Johanne-Marie Tremblay reprised her role as Constance from Jesus of Montreal and The Barbarian Invasions. In 2018, Arcand's The Fall of the American Empire followed similar themes.

== See also ==
- List of submissions to the 76th Academy Awards for Best Foreign Language Film
- List of Canadian submissions for the Academy Award for Best Foreign Language Film
