= Whoever Dies, Dies in Pain =

- French: Quiconque meurt, meurt à douleur
- Directed by: Robert Morin
- Written by: Robert Morin
- Produced by: Lorraine Dufour
- Starring: Bernard Émond
- Cinematography: Jean-Pierre St-Louis
- Edited by: Lorraine Dufour
- Production company: Coop Vidéo de Montréal
- Distributed by: Film Tonic
- Release date: December 27, 1998
- Running time: 90 minutes
- Country: Canada
- Language: French

Whoever Dies, Dies in Pain (French: Quiconque meurt, meurt à douleur) is a 1998 Canadian docufiction film, directed by Robert Morin. Exploring the issue of addiction and starring a cast of predominantly non-professional actors, the film centres on a group of addicts in a crack house, who are telling their stories to a journalist (Bernard Émond) during a police siege.

The film won the Prix Luc-Perreault from the Association québécoise des critiques de cinéma.
