= Requiem for a Handsome Bastard =

1992 film by Robert Morin

- French: Requiem pour un beau sans-cœur
- Directed by: Robert Morin
- Written by: Robert Morin
- Produced by: Lorraine Dufour; Nicole Robert
- Starring: Gildor Roy; Brigitte Paquette; Sabrina Boudot; Stéphan Côté; Jean-Guy Bouchard
- Cinematography: James Gray
- Edited by: Lorraine Dufour
- Production company: Coop Vidéo de Montréal
- Release date: 1992
- Running time: 93 minutes
- Country: Canada
- Language: French

Requiem for a Handsome Bastard (French: Requiem pour un beau sans-cœur) is a 1992 Canadian film written and directed by Robert Morin. The film depicts the downfall of a Montreal criminal following his escape from prison. It was nominated for four Genie Awards and won Best Canadian Feature at the Toronto International Film Festival. The film is based on the story of Richard Blass.

== Plot ==
The film was shot in 35 mm and uses flashback and flashforward narratives. French Canadian criminal Reggie Savoie (the character is based on Richard Blass) is in prison, his son is visiting (five years have passed since their last meeting). During a riot Savoie manages to escape. A manhunt ensues while he enjoys life outside of prison, tortures people, and seeks revenge on someone who testified against him. Three days after his escape Savoie is killed. The story is told through different points of view through the film, eight in total including Savoie's son, an assistant to a policeman following Savoie, and a journalist.

== Accolades ==
At the 1992 Genie Awards, the film was nominated for Best Motion Picture, Morin was nominated for Best Achievement in Direction, Roy was nominated for Best Performance by an Actor in a Leading role, and Jean-Guy Bouchard was nominated for Best Performance by an Actor in a Supporting Role. At the 1992 Toronto International Film Festival Requiem won Best Canadian Feature. In the book Quebec National Cinema, Requiem is credited as having "helped to reinvigorate Quebec cinema".
