= Post Mortem (1999 film) =

- Directed by: Louis Bélanger
- Written by: Louis Bélanger
- Starring: Gabriel Arcand; Sylvie Moreau; Hélène Loiselle
- Cinematography: Jean-Pierre St-Louis
- Music by: Guy Bélanger; Steve Hill
- Release date: 1999
- Running time: 92 minutes
- Country: Canada
- Language: French

Post Mortem is a 1999 Canadian drama film directed by Louis Bélanger. The film won two Genie Awards, including Best Actress for Moreau.

== Cast ==
- Gabriel Arcand - Ghislain O'Brien
- Sylvie Moreau - Linda Faucher
- Hélène Loiselle - Madame Faucher
- Sarah Lecomte-Bergeron - Charlotte Faucher
- Ghislain Taschereau - Marc
- Pierre Collin - Lieutenant Bélanger

== Accolades ==
Award	Date of ceremony	Category	Recipient(s)	Result	Ref(s)
Genie Awards	January 2000	Best Motion Picture	Lorraine Dufour	Nominated	
Genie Awards	January 2000	Best Direction	Louis Bélanger	Nominated	
Genie Awards	January 2000	Best Original Screenplay	Louis Bélanger	Won	
Genie Awards	January 2000	Best Actor	Gabriel Arcand	Nominated	
Genie Awards	January 2000	Best Actress	Sylvie Moreau	Won	
Genie Awards	January 2000	Claude Jutra Award	Louis Bélanger	Won	
Jutra Awards	5 March 2000	Best Film	Lorraine Dufour, Coop Video de Montreal	Won	
Jutra Awards	5 March 2000	Best Director	Louis Bélanger	Won	
Jutra Awards	5 March 2000	Best Screenplay	Louis Bélanger	Won	
Jutra Awards	5 March 2000	Best Actor	Gabriel Arcand	Won	
Jutra Awards	5 March 2000	Best Editing	Lorraine Dufour	Won	
Montréal World Film Festival	27 August–6 September 1999	Best Director	Louis Bélanger	Won	
Santa Barbara International Film Festival	2–12 March 2000	Independent Voice Award	Louis Bélanger	Won	
Santa Barbara International Film Festival	2–12 March 2000	Special Jury Prize for Artistic Merit	Louis Bélanger	Won	
