= The Negro (film) =

- French: Le Nèg
- Directed by: Robert Morin
- Written by: Robert Morin
- Produced by: Lorraine Dufour
- Starring: Iannicko N'Doua-Légaré; Béatrice Picard; Robin Aubert; Vincent Bilodeau; Sandrine Bisson
- Cinematography: Jean-Pierre St-Louis
- Edited by: Lorraine Dufour
- Music by: Bertrand Chénier
- Production companies: Coop Vidéo de Montréal; Les Productions 23
- Distributed by: Christal Films
- Release date: September 11, 2002 (TIFF)
- Running time: 92 minutes
- Country: Canada
- Language: Quebec French

The Negro (French: Le Nèg') is a 2002 Canadian drama film, directed by Robert Morin. An examination of racism, the film centres on a police officer in a small Quebec town who is trying to reconstruct, through the conflicting testimony of witnesses and participants, the events of the night before, when the petty vandalism of a woman's lawn jockey escalated within a few hours to the woman being found dead and the young Black Canadian suspected of committing the vandalism having been viciously beaten in a field.

The film's original title, equivalent in Quebec French to "the nigger", was controversial, with a Black youth group in Montreal demanding that the film's title and promotional poster be changed. Morin, however, defended his choice to use a controversial title, stating that "If it stirs up some controversy, then at least people will be talking about racism."

The film's cast includes Iannicko N'Doua-Légaré, Béatrice Picard, Robin Aubert, Vincent Bilodeau, Emmanuel Bilodeau, Sandrine Bisson, René-Daniel Dubois, Jean-Guy Bouchard and Dorothée Berryman.

== Awards ==
The film was named to the Toronto International Film Festival's year-end Canada's Top Ten list for 2002.

The film received four Genie Award nominations at the 23rd Genie Awards in 2003: Best Original Screenplay (Morin), Best Costume Design (Sophie Lefebvre), Best Editing (George Browne and Lorraine Dufour) and Best Art Direction or Production Design (André-Line Beauparlant).

The film received three Prix Jutra nominations, for Best Direction (Morin), Best Screenplay (Morin) and Best Editing (Dufour). Dufour won the award for Best Editing.
