= Pénélope McQuade =

Canadian radio and television host

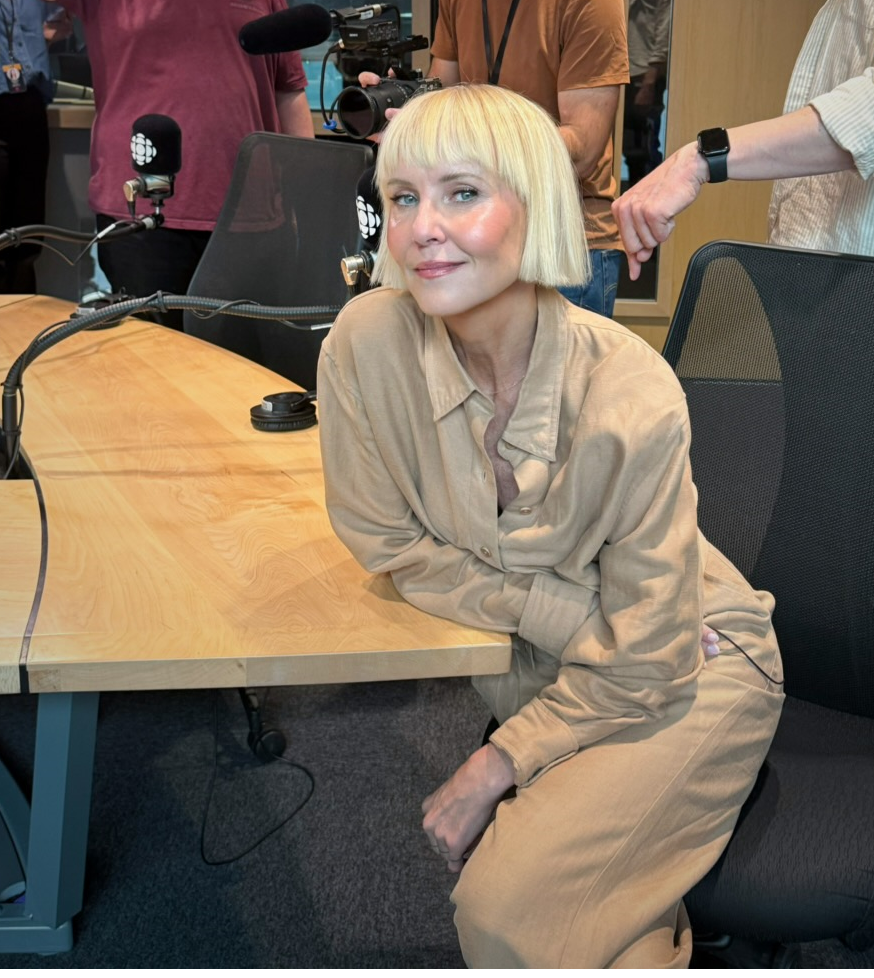
Pénélope McQuade en octobre 2025.

Pénélope McQuade (born November 24, 1970) is a Canadian radio and television host.

The daughter of France Rivard and journalist Winston McQuade, she was born in Quebec City, Quebec. While she was young, she spent two years in Toronto before her family moved to Montreal. McQuade studied arts and communications at the Cégep Jean-de-Brébeuf and then journalism at the Université du Québec à Montréal. After completing her education, she worked for various Quebec broadcasters.

In 1999, she received a Prix Gémeaux for best host in the youth category for Cyberclub. In 2003, she received another Gémeaux award for best host for Passep’Art.

== Television ==
- 1993 Service compris (Radio-Québec)
- 1994 - 1996 Bla bla bla (TVA)
- 1995 - 1996 Automag Plus (TVA)
- 1995 Bon dimanche (TVA)
- 1996 - 2000 Salut, Bonjour! (TVA)
- 2005 - 2008 Star Système (TVA)
- 2007 - 2010 Salut Bonjour Week-end (TVA)
- 2011+ Pénélope McQuade (Radio-Canada)
- 2012 Ici et maintenant (Radio-Canada)
- 2014 16e soirée des prix Jutra, host (Radio-Canada)
- 2015 17e soirée des prix Jutra, host (Radio-Canada)

== Radio ==
- 1994 CKAC
- 1999 Rythme FM
- 2001 - 2003 NRJ
- 2003 - 2004 Rock Détente
