= Isabelle Dedieu =

French film editor

- Born: 20 April 1956 (age 69); Paris, France
- Occupation: Film editor
- Awards: César Award for Best Editing; Genie Award for Best Editing

Isabelle Dedieu (born 20 April 1956) is a French film editor who has worked in both French and Quebec films and has won both César Awards and Genie Awards.

Born in Paris, she edited the 1986 French film Thérèse and won the César Award for Best Editing. For French Canadian director Denys Arcand, she edited the 1989 film Jesus of Montreal and won the Genie Award for Best Editing. She worked with Arcand again for other projects, including The Barbarian Invasions (2003), for which she was nominated for the Genie Award for Best Editing, and the Jutra Award for Best Editing.

== Filmography ==
Films include:

- Thérèse (1986)
- Jesus of Montreal (1989)
- Stardom (2000)
- The Barbarian Invasions (2003)
- Days of Darkness (2007)
- Rafiki (2018)
