= Luc Vandal =

Canadian film producer (born 1955)

- Born: 1955 (age 69–70); Saint-Hyacinthe, Quebec, Canada
- Occupation: Film producer
- Notable work: Maelström
- Awards: Genie Award – Best Picture 2001 Maelström – Producer; Jutra Award – Best Film 2001 Maelström – Producer

Luc Vandal (born 1955 in Saint-Hyacinthe, Quebec) is a Canadian Quebecois film producer. He is most noted as a producer of Denis Villeneuve's 2000 film Maelström, which won the Genie Award for Best Picture at the 21st Genie Awards and the Jutra Award for Best Film at the 3rd Jutra Awards.

== Filmography ==
- CSN, 1996
- The Caretaker's Lodge (La Conciergerie), 1997
- When I Will Be Gone (L'âge de braise), 1998
- Matroni and Me (Matroni et moi), 1999
- Life After Love (La vie après l'amour), 2000
- Maelström, 2000
- Tar Angel (L'Ange de goudron), 2001
- Chaos and Desire (La Turbulence des fluides), 2002
- How My Mother Gave Birth to Me During Menopause (Comment ma mère accoucha de moi durant sa ménopause), 2003
- Father and Sons (Père et fils), 2003
- Seducing Doctor Lewis (La Grande séduction), 2003
- Life with My Father (La vie avec mon père), 2005
- Saint Martyrs of the Damned (Saints-Martyrs-des-Damnés), 2005
- The Chinese Botanist's Daughters (Les filles du botaniste), 2006
- The Secret Life of Happy People (La vie secrète des gens heureux), 2006
- Borderline, 2008
- Romaine 30° Below (Romaine par moins 30), 2009
- Through the Mist (Dédé à travers les brumes), 2009
- Crying Out (À l'origine d'un cri), 2010
- Another Silence, 2011
- Wetlands (Marécages), 2011
- Liverpool, 2012
- The Day of the Crows (Le jour des corneilles), 2012
- Bad Seeds (Les mauvaises herbes), 2016
- Infiltration (Le problème d'infiltration), 2017
- Goddess of the Fireflies (La déesse des mouches à feu), 2018
- Bungalow, 2022
