= Gala Québec Cinéma =

Canadian film award

- Awarded for: Best films in Quebec
- Location: Montreal, Quebec
- Country: Canada
- Presented by: Québec Cinéma
- Reward: Prix Iris
- First award: 1999

Highlights
- Most wins: C.R.A.Z.Y (16 awards)
- Website: gala.quebeccinema.ca

The Gala Québec Cinéma is a Quebec film award, presented annually by Québec Cinéma, which recognizes talent and achievement primarily in the feature film industry of Quebec. Until 2016, it was known as La soirée des prix Jutra (The evening of the Jutra prizes) in reference of influential Quebec film director Claude Jutra, but Jutra's name was withdrawn from the awards following the publication of Yves Lever's biography of Jutra, which alleged that he had sexually abused children.

It should not be confused with the Claude Jutra Award, a special award presented by the Academy of Canadian Cinema & Television as part of the separate Canadian Screen Awards program which was also renamed in 2016 following the allegations against Jutra.

== History ==
Introduced in 1999, the awards are presented for Best Film and performance, writing and technical categories such as best actor, actress, director, screenplay, et cetera. Due to Quebec's majority francophone population, most films made in the province are French-language films, but English-language films made in the province are also fully eligible for nomination. The awards maintain slightly different eligibility criteria for international coproductions, however: a coproduction which surpasses the organization's criteria for "majority Québécois" involvement is treated the same as a Quebec film, with full eligibility in all categories, while a coproduction which is classified as "minority Québécois", such as the 2015 film Brooklyn, is eligible only in categories where a resident of Quebec is the nominee, and cannot be submitted for Best Film.

The initial creation of the awards sparked some concern that the idea of a separate award for Quebec films would undermine the pan-Canadian scope of the Genie Awards; Québec Cinéma clarified that it did not have, and would not impose, a rule that films could not be submitted for both awards, although at least one film producer, Roger Frappier, voluntarily declined to submit the films August 32nd on Earth (Un 32 août sur terre) and 2 Seconds (2 secondes) for Genie consideration at all on the grounds that since neither film was projected to be popular outside Quebec, they would purportedly not get any public relations or marketing benefit out of Genie nominations. Frappier has not subsequently refused to submit other films to the Genies or the Canadian Screen Awards after 1999.

Following the withdrawal of Jutra's name from the award, the 2016 awards were presented solely under the name Québec Cinéma pending an announcement of the award's new permanent name. The Prix Iris name was announced in October 2016.

The trophy was designed by sculptor Charles Daudelin. The awards replaced the prix Guy-L'Écuyer, created in 1987 by Les Rendez-vous du cinéma québécois in memory of actor Guy L'Écuyer.

The 22nd Quebec Cinema Awards ceremony, originally planned for June 7, 2020, was cancelled due to the COVID-19 pandemic in Canada; unlike the 8th Canadian Screen Awards, however, the award nominations had not yet been released when the cancellation of the ceremony was announced. Nominations were still released on April 22, and the winners were announced via livestreaming on June 10.

Following the death of influential Quebec filmmaker Jean-Marc Vallée in December 2021, there was some public demand that Québec Cinéma rename the awards to the Prix Vallée in his honour.

In 2022, Radio-Canada announced that due to declining ratings in recent years, it would not televise the 2023 awards, and was instead planning alternative ways to highlight Quebec film in its programming. In February 2023, Québec Cinéma indicated that it was in negotiations with other broadcasters to carry the 25th Quebec Cinema Awards; as of May 2023, however, the organization had confirmed only that the ceremony would not take place in its usual June scheduling. In July 2023, Québec Cinéma announced that the ceremony would be held in December 2023, and broadcast by Noovo.

The organization maintained the December scheduling for the next few years, with an eligibility period extending from September of the previous year to August of the same year as the ceremony. In October 2026, Québec Cinéma announced that the 28th awards will be held in spring 2027 rather than December 2026, returning to the traditional scheduling.

== Ceremonies and Best Film winners ==
Ceremony	Date	Best Picture	Host	Location	Broadcaster
1st	March 7, 1999	The Red Violin (Le violon rouge)	Rémy Girard	Théâtre Saint-Denis	TVA
2nd	March 5, 2000	Post Mortem	Yves Jacques and Élise Guilbault	Monument-National	TVA
3rd	February 25, 2001	Maelström	Yves Jacques and Élise Guilbault	Théâtre Saint-Denis	TVA
4th	February 17, 2002	Soft Shell Man (Un crabe dans la tête)	Sylvie Moreau	Théâtre Saint-Denis	TVA
5th	February 23, 2003	Québec-Montréal	Sylvie Moreau	Théâtre Maisonneuve	Radio-Canada
6th	February 22, 2004	The Barbarian Invasions (Les invasions barbares)	Sylvie Moreau	Théâtre Maisonneuve	Radio-Canada
7th	February 20, 2005	Looking for Alexander (Mémoires affectives)	Patrick Huard	Théâtre Maisonneuve	Radio-Canada
8th	March 19, 2006	C.R.A.Z.Y.	Normand Brathwaite	Théâtre Maisonneuve	Radio-Canada
9th	February 18, 2007	Congorama	Normand Brathwaite	Théâtre Maisonneuve	Radio-Canada
10th	March 9, 2008	Continental, a Film Without Guns (Continental, un film sans fusil)	Normand Brathwaite	Théâtre Saint-Denis	Radio-Canada
11th	March 29, 2009	The Necessities of Life (Ce qu'il faut pour vivre)	Karine Vanasse	Théâtre Saint-Denis	Radio-Canada
12th	March 28, 2010	I Killed My Mother (J'ai tué ma mère)	Patrice L'Écuyer	Théâtre Saint-Denis	Radio-Canada
13th	March 13, 2011	Incendies	Yves Pelletier and Sylvie Moreau	Théâtre Saint-Denis	Radio-Canada
14th	March 11, 2012	Monsieur Lazhar	Yves Pelletier and Sylvie Moreau	Théâtre Saint-Denis	Radio-Canada
15th	March 17, 2013	War Witch (Rebelle)	Rémy Girard	Salle Pierre-Mercure	Radio-Canada
16th	March 23, 2014	Louis Cyr (Louis Cyr: L'homme le plus fort du monde)	Pénélope McQuade and Laurent Paquin	Monument-National	Radio-Canada
17th	March 15, 2015	Mommy	Pénélope McQuade and Stéphane Bellavance	Monument-National	Radio-Canada
18th	March 20, 2016	The Passion of Augustine (La passion d'Augustine)	Pénélope McQuade and Stéphane Bellavance	Monument-National	Radio-Canada
19th	June 4, 2017	It's Only the End of the World (Juste la fin du monde)	Guylaine Tremblay and Édith Cochrane	Maison Radio-Canada	Radio-Canada
20th	June 3, 2018	Ravenous (Les affamés)	Guylaine Tremblay and Édith Cochrane	Maison Radio-Canada	Radio-Canada
21st	June 2, 2019	1991	Guylaine Tremblay and Édith Cochrane	Maison Radio-Canada	Radio-Canada
22nd	June 10, 2020	Antigone	No ceremony due to the COVID-19 pandemic; winners were announced via livestreaming.		Radio-Canada
23rd	June 6, 2021	Goddess of the Fireflies (La déesse des mouches à feu)	Geneviève Schmidt	Maison Radio-Canada	Radio-Canada
24th	June 5, 2022	Drunken Birds (Les oiseaux ivres)	Geneviève Schmidt	Maison Radio-Canada	Radio-Canada
25th	December 10, 2023	Viking	Jay Du Temple	Grandé Studios	Noovo
26th	December 8, 2024	Humanist Vampire Seeking Consenting Suicidal Person (Vampire humaniste cherche suicidaire consentant)	Phil Roy	Grandé Studios	Noovo
27th	December 7, 2025	Universal Language (Une langue universelle)	Phil Roy	Grandé Studios	Noovo

== Most wins and nominations ==
The following films received at least 10 nominations:

Nominations	Title
22	Humanist Vampire Seeking Consenting Suicidal Person
18	Viking
17	Drunken Birds
17	Universal Language
16	1991
16	Goddess of the Fireflies
16	Maria Chapdelaine
15	Peak Everything
15	Two Women
14	C.R.A.Z.Y.
14	The Rocket
14	The 3 L'il Pigs
14	Babysitter
14	Red Rooms
14	The Nature of Love
13	Seducing Doctor Lewis
13	Bon Cop, Bad Cop
13	And the Birds Rained Down
13	Underground
13	The Vinland Club
13	The Time Thief
13	Shepherds
12	The Barbarian Invasions
12	A Sunday in Kigali
12	Incendies
12	It's Only the End of the World
12	Two Lovers and a Bear
12	For Those Who Don't Read Me
12	The Dishwasher
11	The Red Violin
11	Laurence Anyways
11	Louis Cyr
11	Mommy
11	The Passion of Augustine
11	La Bolduc
11	A Brother's Love
11	Ghost Town Anthology
11	My Salinger Year
11	Beans
11	1995
10	Séraphin: Heart of Stone
10	Gaz Bar Blues
10	Audition
10	Through the Mist
10	Monsieur Lazhar
10	War Witch
10	Gabrielle
10	You're Sleeping Nicole
10	Tom at the Farm
10	Corbo
10	Hochelaga, Land of Souls
10	Infiltration
10	Mafia Inc.
10	Target Number One
10	Richelieu
10	Solo

The following films received at least 5 awards (including non-competitive):

Awards	Title
16	C.R.A.Z.Y.
11	Viking
10	Incendies
10	Mommy
10	Drunken Birds
9	The Red Violin
9	Maelström
9	Louis Cyr
8	Monsieur Lazhar
8	War Witch
8	Ravenous
8	Humanist Vampire Seeking Consenting Suicidal Person
8	Universal Language
7	Soft Shell Man
7	The Barbarian Invasions
7	Seducing Doctor Lewis
7	Séraphin: Heart of Stone
7	Goddess of the Fireflies
6	A Sunday in Kigali
6	The Passion of Augustine
6	La Bolduc
6	Antigone
5	Post Mortem
5	Bittersweet Memories
5	Congorama
5	Babine
5	Polytechnique
5	Gabrielle
5	It's Only the End of the World
5	Hochelaga, Land of Souls
5	1991

The following individuals received at least 10 nominations:

Nominations	Nominee
32	Bernard Gariépy Strobl
31	Xavier Dolan
27	Luc Boudrias
26	Sylvain Corbeil
26	Nancy Grant
24	Luc Déry
23	Sylvain Bellemare
23	Kim McCraw
18	Olivier Calvert
16	Stéphane Bergeron
15	Kathryn Casault
15	Claude La Haye
15	Martin Lapointe
15	André Turpin
14	Claude Beaugrand
14	Roger Frappier
14	Sara Mishara
14	Denise Robert
13	André-Line Beauparlant
13	Denis Côté
13	Philippe Falardeau
13	Stéphane Lafleur
13	Robert Morin
13	Luc Picard
13	Hans Peter Strobl
13	Luc Vandal
12	Marc Bertrand
12	Céline Bonnier
12	Gavin Fernandes
12	Ricardo Trogi
11	Nathalie Boutrie
11	Monia Chokri
11	Marie-Claude Lafontaine
11	Denis Villeneuve
10	Robin Aubert
10	Francesca Chamberland
10	Sophie Deraspe
10	Louis Gignac
10	Nathanaël Karmitz
10	Lyse Lafontaine
10	Christian Larouche
10	Ginette Magny
10	Galilé Marion-Gauvin
10	Kim Nguyen
10	Denis Parent
10	Theodore Ushev

The following individuals received at least 5 awards (including non-competitive):

Awards	Nominee
15	Xavier Dolan
10	Bernard Gariépy Strobl
10	Nancy Grant
9	Luc Déry
9	André Turpin
9	Denis Villeneuve
8	Kim McCraw
8	Stéphane Lafleur
7	Sylvain Corbeil
7	Martin Lapointe
7	Denise Robert
7	Jean-Marc Vallée
6	Claude Beaugrand
6	Sylvain Bellemare
6	Richard Comeau
6	Hans Peter Strobl
5	Denys Arcand
5	Louise Archambault
5	Philippe Falardeau
5	Claude La Haye
5	Christian Larouche
5	Léa Pool

== "Big Five" winners and nominees ==
To date, thirteen films were nominated for the "Big Five" categories: Best Film, Best Director, Best Actor, Best Actress and Best Screenplay. Of those, only Mommy managed to win all five awards.

1. 2 Seconds (2 secondes) - 1999
2. Tar Angel (L'ange de goudron) - 2002
3. The Barbarian Invasions (Les invasions barbares) – 2004
4. The Rocket (Maurice Richard) – 2006
5. The Novena (La neuvaine) – 2006
6. Days of Darkness (L'âge des ténèbres) – 2008
7. I Killed My Mother (J'ai tué ma mère) – 2010
8. Mommy – 2015
9. Two Lovers and a Bear – 2017
10. Family First (Chien de garde) – 2018
11. Viking – 2023
12. Humanist Vampire Seeking Consenting Suicidal Person (Vampire humaniste cherche suicidaire consentant) – 2024
13. The Nature of Love (Simple comme Sylvain) – 2024

== Categories ==
- Best Film
- Best Director
- Best Actor
- Best Actress
- Best Supporting Actor
- Best Supporting Actress
- Best Screenplay
- Best Documentary Film
- Best Live Action Short Film
- Best Animated Short Film
- Best Art Direction
- Best Casting
- Best Cinematography
- Best Cinematography in a Documentary
- Best Costume Design
- Best Editing
- Best Editing in a Documentary
- Best First Film
- Best Hair
- Best Makeup
- Best Original Music
- Best Original Music in a Documentary
- Best Short Documentary
- Best Sound
- Best Sound in a Documentary
- Best Visual Effects
- Most Successful Film Outside Quebec
- Most Successful Short Film Outside Quebec
- Public Prize
- Revelation of the Year
- Tribute

== See also ==
- Cinema of Quebec
- List of Quebec film directors
- List of Quebec films
- Prix Albert-Tessier, lifetime achievement awards in Quebec cinema given by the Government of Quebec
