= Robert Morin =

Canadian film director, actor and cinematographer

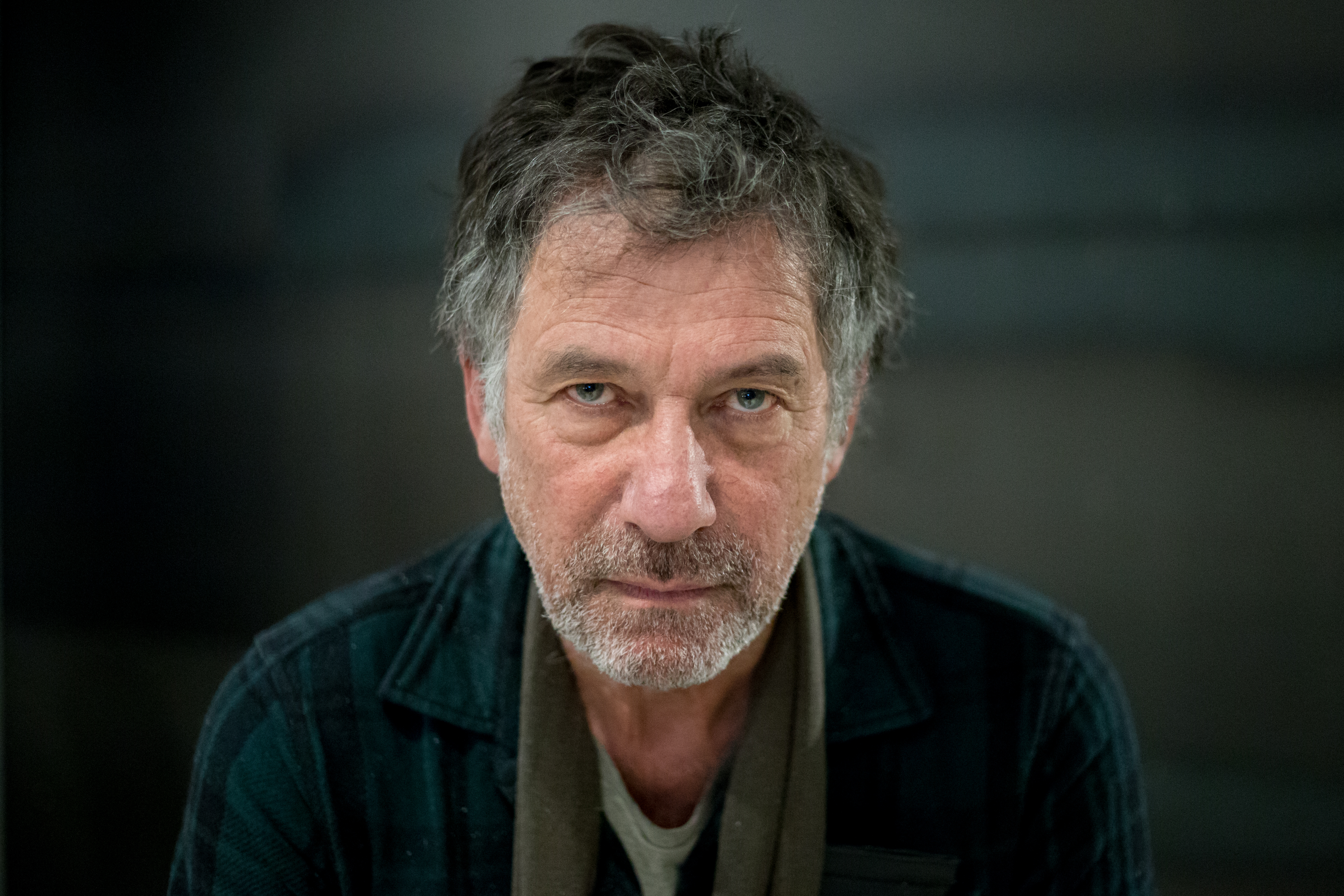
- Born: May 20, 1949 (age 76); Montreal, Quebec
- Occupations: Film director Screenwriter cinematographer
- Years active: 1977–present
- Spouse: André-Line Beauparlant

Robert Morin (born May 20, 1949) is a Canadian film director, screenwriter, and cinematographer. In 2009, he received the Governor General's Award in Visual and Media Arts.

== Biography ==
Robert Morin is known for his very personal, dark, and pessimistic "interior views" of family, crime, law enforcement, and human suffering, with his work regularly moving back and forth between relatively conventional dramas with multi-actor casts, and experimental personal essay films in which Morin, or a single actor cast as a stand-in, stars in essentially a film-length philosophical monologue from the perspective of a character who, whether by choice or circumstance, has become an outsider to mainstream society.

After studying literature and communications, in 1971 he began to work as a cameraman, joining ORTQ in Rimouski, where he directed films and videos. In 1977, with a group of friends and colleagues, Morin founded La Coopérative de Production Vidéo de Montréal, where he continues to produce his own work. After creating close to 30 short films with his colleagues over 10 years, he directed his first feature-length film Scale-Model Sadness (Tristesse modèle réduit) in 1987.

His film Requiem for a Handsome Bastard (Requiem pour un beau sans-coeur) won the Toronto International Film Festival Award for Best Canadian Film at the 1992 Toronto International Film Festival, and received four Genie Award nominations at the 13th Genie Awards in 1992, including Best Picture and Best Director.

In 2026 his wife, André-Line Beauparlant, released This Love, These Days (Mon amour, c’est pour le restant de mes jours), a documentary film about their relationship.

== Filmography ==
=== Feature films ===
- Scale-Model Sadness (Tristesse modèle réduit) - 1987
- The Reception (La réception) - 1989
- Requiem for a Handsome Bastard (Requiem pour un beau sans-coeur) - 1992
- Windigo - 1994
- Yes Sir! Madame... - 1994
- Whoever Dies, Dies in Pain (Quiconque meurt, meurt à douleur) - 1998
- Opération Cobra - 2001
- The Negro (Le nèg') - 2002
- Yule Croak (Petit Pow! Pow! Noël) - 2005
- May God Bless America (Que Dieu bénisse l'Amérique) - 2006
- Daddy Goes Ptarmigan Hunting (Papa à la chasse aux lagopèdes) - 2008
- Diary of an Aid Worker (Journal d'un coopérant) - 2010
- The Four Soldiers (Les Quatre Soldats) - 2013
- 3 Indian Tales (3 histoires d'Indiens) - 2014
- Heaven Sent (Un Paradis pour tous) - 2016
- Infiltration (Le problème d’infiltration) - 2017
- Wild Feast (Festin boréal) - 2023
- Six Neorealist Portraits (Six portraits néoréalistes) - 2026

=== Short films ===
- La femme étrangère (The Woman from Elsewhere) (Documentary co-directed with Lorraine Dufour, 1988)
- Le voleur vit en enfer (The Thief Lives in Hell) (Short film co-directed with Lorraine Dufour, 1984)
- Mauvais mal (Evil Madness) (Short film co-directed with Lorraine Dufour, 1984)
- On se paye la gomme (We Treat Ourselves to the Best) (Short film co-directed with Marcel Chouinard, 1984)
- Toi t'es-tu lucky (And You, Are You Lucky?) (Short film co-directed with Lorraine Dufour, 1984)
- Le mystérieux Paul (The Mysterious Paul) (Short film co-directed with Lorraine Dufour, 1983)
- A Postcard from Victoria (Short film co-directed with Lorraine Dufour, 1983)
- Ma richesse a cause mes privations (My Wealth Caused My Deprivations) (Short film co-directed with Lorraine Dufour, 1982)
- Il a gagné ses épaulettes (He Won His Wings) (Documentary co-directed with Lorraine Dufour, 1981)
- Gus est encore dans l'armée (Gus Is Still in the Army) (Short film co-directed with Lorraine Dufour, 1980)
- Ma vie c'est pour le restant de mes jours (My Life Is for the Rest of my Life) (Short film co-directed with Lorraine Dufour, 1980)
- Le royaume est commencé (The Kingdom Has Come) (Short film co-directed with Lorraine Dufour, 1980)
- Même mort il faut s'organiser (Even Dead You Have To Get Organized) (Short film, 1977)
