= Louis Bélanger =

Canadian film director and screenwriter

- Born: 1964 (age 61–62); Beauport, Quebec, Canada
- Occupations: Film director Screenwriter
- Years active: 1988–present

Louis Bélanger (born 1964) is a Canadian film director and screenwriter. He has a degree in communications from UQAM. He is a collaborator of filmmaker Denis Chouinard; both men created several short films together before branching off into their own careers with feature films. His film Post Mortem won him Best Director at the Montreal World Film Festival and earned him two Genie Awards, for best new director and best screenplay.

He began making films and long-form videos while a student. He shot videos for Télévision Suisse Romande in the late 1990s before turning to directing his first feature, Post Mortem in 1999. His follow-up was Lauzon-Lauzone, a documentary about director Jean-Claude Lauzon, and a second feature in 2003, Gaz Bar Blues. Influenced by the man-of-the-people-docudrama style of John Cassavetes and Ken Loach, he has said that "there aren’t any new stories to tell; all that matters is the telling."

== Filmography ==
=== Feature films ===
- Post Mortem - 1999
- Gaz Bar Blues - 2003
- The Genius of Crime (Le génie du crime) - 2006
- The Timekeeper (L'Heure de vérité) - 2009
- Route 132 - 2010
- Bad Seeds (Les Mauvaises herbes) - 2016
- Living 100 MPH (Vivre à 100 milles à l'heure) - 2019
- 125, rue des Malaises - 2026

=== Other films ===
- Dogmatisme ou Le songe d'Adrien (Short film co-directed with Denis Chouinard, 1988)
- Le soleil et ses traces (Short film co-directed with Denis Chouinard, 1990)
- Les galeries Wilderton (Short film, 1991)
- Les 14 définitions de la pluie (Short film co-directed with Denis Chouinard, 1993)
- Lauzon Lauzone (Documentary, 2000)
- Nightlight (TV movie, 2003), starring Shannen Doherty, thriller film about a stalker, also known as View of Terror
- Lies and Deception (TV movie, 2005)
