= Gaz Bar Blues =

- Poster
- Directed by: Louis Bélanger
- Screenplay by: Louis Bélanger
- Produced by: Lorraine Dufour
- Starring: Serge Thériault
- Cinematography: Jean-Pierre St-Louis
- Edited by: Lorraine Dufour
- Music by: Guy Bélanger; Claude Fradette
- Release date: 2003
- Running time: 115 minutes
- Country: Canada
- Language: French

Gaz Bar Blues is a 2003 Canadian comedy-drama film written and directed by Louis Bélanger. The film is set in 1989 in the outskirts of an unspecified Québécois city.

== Plot ==
François Brochu (Serge Thériault), named "the boss", is the owner of a gas station. He manages his relationships with his sons Réjean, Guy, the 13-year-old Alain, with which manages the station; and his daughter Nathalie (Fanny Mallette). The Gas Bar is also regularly attended by his friends as Gaston Savard (Gilles Renaud), Jos, Normand Party, Yves Michaud, Claude, Nelson and Ti-Pit.

Mr. Brochu, widower and suffering an initial Parkinson's disease, would like to keep his family united by the work at the station; but the dissatisfaction of the boys with the routine seems to send them away. Guy (Danny Gilmore) is a harmonica player that plays with a band and is often lacking during the turns, Réjean (Sébastien Delorme) is the most responsible but angry by rising crime and unhappy with his father's way to manage the station. He is an amateur photographer and decides to reach Berlin to see the imminent fall of the wall. The film shows the incoming Revolutions of 1989 in background but life goes on normally around the Gaz Bar, which problems are the transition from gallons to litres, the construction of new self-service stations and the arrival of Gobeil (Daniel Brière), inspector of the company Champlain that owns the station.

During the absence of Réjean, Alain starts working alone at the station, helped by Mr. Savard. Guy disappears for 3 days because of a car accident. When he come back, he has a quarrel with his father and leaves the home. Réjean writes quite often at home, telling of his experience and disillusion about the German reunification process. He sees the way in which the transition is managed as a kind of forced modernization, which suddenly clears the everyday life of East Germans, as well as the new self-services will replace filling stations.

Arrested in East Berlin while attempting to rebuild the Berlin Wall (a symbolic gesture), and repatriated to Canada, Réjean starts again working. One day he faces the inspector Gobeil, telling him he's a madmen and threatening him if he continues to torment his father. During the nth robbery, Alain is taken hostage and then exchanged with his father. Mr. Brochu, saved by police, begins to reflect on the fact that his desire to keep the family together with the work in the gas station is dismembering it. So he decides to start therapy against Parkinson in the hospital and to attend a concert of his son Guy in a pub. One day he decides to close the activity of the gas station and retires to be closer to his 4 kids. The day after Jos and Ti-Pit read the "End of Business" message of "The Boss": first perplexed, immediately go in search of the other friends of the group, sure to find them at the convenience store.

== Cast ==
- Serge Thériault as François Brochu
- Gilles Renaud as Gaston Savard
- Sébastien Delorme as Réjean Brochu
- Danny Gilmore as Guy Brochu
- Maxime Dumontier as Alain Brochu
- Fanny Mallette as Nathalie Brochu
- Gaston Caron as Jos
- Gaston Lepage as Normand Patry
- Daniel Gadouas as Yves Michaud
- Roger Léger as Claude
- Claude Legault as Ti-Pit
- Réal Bossé as Nelson
- Yves Bélanger as Coyote
- Vincent Bilodeau as Mononc' Boivin
- Daniel Rousse as Dan
- Marc Beaupré as Yoyo
- Daniel Brière as Inspector Gobeil
- Emmanuel Bilodeau as Jocelyn

== Awards ==
- 2003 Special Grand Prix of the Jury of the Montreal World Film Festival
- 2004 Jutra Award for the Best Actor to Serge Thériault
- 2004 Jutra Award for the Best Music to Guy Bélanger and Claude Fradette

== See also ==
- List of Canadian films of 2003
