= Seducing Doctor Lewis =

- Movie poster
- French: La grande séduction
- Directed by: Jean-François Pouliot
- Written by: Ken Scott
- Produced by: Roger Frappier; Luc Vandal
- Starring: Raymond Bouchard; David Boutin; Benoît Brière; Lucie Laurier
- Cinematography: Allen Smith
- Edited by: Dominique Fortin
- Music by: Francois-Pierre Lue; Maxime Barzel; Paul-Étienne Côté
- Distributed by: Alliance Atlantis (Canada); Dogwoof Pictures (UK); Wellspring Media (USA)
- Release date: 20 May 2003
- Running time: 108 minutes
- Country: Canada
- Language: French
- Box office: $12,587,032

Seducing Doctor Lewis (French: La grande séduction, lit. 'The Great Seduction') is a 2003 Quebec comedy film, starring Raymond Bouchard, Benoît Brière, David Boutin and Lucie Laurier. It is the first film directed by Jean-François Pouliot. The script was written by Ken Scott.

It won the Audience Award at the 2004 Sundance Film Festival.

== Plot ==
The small fishing village Ste-Marie-la-Mauderne on the north coast of Quebec is in decline. Every resident collects welfare. To lure a company into building a plastic container factory nearby, they need to double their population of 120, have a resident doctor, and give a $50,000 bribe for the company owner.

Montreal plastic surgeon Dr. Christopher Lewis (David Boutin) gets pulled over for speeding by an officer, Réal Fournier (Jean-Pierre Gonthier), the former mayor of Ste-Marie-la-Mauderne who moved to the city because he, like most of the residents of Ste-Marie, couldn't get a job there. After finding cocaine on Dr. Lewis, Fournier agrees not arrest him for drug possession if Dr. Lewis will visit Ste-Marie-la-Mauderne for one month.

Germain Lesage (Raymond Bouchard), a welfare recipient himself and the new mayor, hatches a plan. The entire village will convince Dr. Lewis to stay. They tap his phone, and pretend to share his interests: cricket, fusion jazz, and all the same foods. Henri Giroux (Benoît Brière), the local banker whose sole job is to cash the townfolks' welfare cheques, leaves small amounts of money for Dr. Lewis to find as small measures to increase Dr. Lewis' happiness about being in town, and attempts to secure a loan through his bank for the bribe. Dr. Lewis likes the post office worker Ève Beauchemin (Lucie Laurier), but Ève knows he has a girlfriend, Brigitte, in Montreal.

The ruse works, but they cannot secure a loan. Henri fronts the money from his personal savings, after a bank executive tells him that he has a job only as a favour to his father, and that his position could easily be replaced by an ATM. When the plastics company owner arrives, everyone continues their elaborate trick, and convinces him to build the factory there. The owner is ready to sign, but insists that they must have a doctor.

When Dr. Lewis learns that Brigitte has been having an affair with his best friend Paul for three years, he proclaims that he will stay because everyone in the village is genuine. Germain feels bad for lying, and "lets him off the hook" by telling him another lie in that they have secured another person as a permanent doctor. Hurt, Dr. Lewis turns to Ève, who has disliked all the lying, and confesses all to him, including the phone tap. Dr. Lewis confronts Germain about the lies, with Germain confirming the accusations. When Dr. Lewis asks him if he will learn the game of cricket for real if he decides to stay, Germain replies "no". It is then that Dr. Lewis decides to stay. The factory is built, Ste-Marie-la-Mauderne is saved, everyone gains renewed pride, and Dr. Lewis has five years in which to woo Ève.

== Production ==
Producer Roger Frappier wanted to film Seducing Doctor Lewis in Newfoundland. However, the film was eventually shot in Harrington Harbour, Quebec, Canada, an island with a population of about 300. The film's producers felt the island looked too pretty to fill the role of a fishing village experiencing hard times, so they worsened its appearance in the movie.

== Awards ==
- Winner - Sundance Film Festival: World Cinema Audience Award Genie Award – Cinematography; Prix Jutra – Supporting Actor (Pierre Collin), Supporting Actress (Desrochers), Editing, Cinematography, Art Director, Sound and Costumes.

== Remakes ==
An English-language remake titled The Grand Seduction was released in 2013, starring Taylor Kitsch as Dr Lewis with Brendan Gleeson, Mary Walsh, Cathy Jones, and Gordon Pinsent as town folks. The story's setting was moved to Newfoundland.

A French remake Un village presque parfait (English: An almost perfect village) produced by Stéphane Meunier, was released in 2015. The action takes place in a small imaginary Pyrenean village : Saint-Loin-la-Mauderne, which is twinned with Sainte-Marie-la-Mauderne from the original movie.

An Italian remake was released in 2016; titled Un paese quasi perfetto (English: An almost perfect village), this version was directed by Massimo Gaudioso. It takes place in a small imaginary village called Pietramezzana (whose name was formed by merging the names of the two real towns Pietrapertosa and Castelmezzano in Basilicata where the film was shot).

A Spanish-language remake titled La Gran Seducción (English: The Great Seduction) was released in 2023 on Netflix. Directed by Celso García and featuring Yalitza Aparicio, the film is set in Mexico.

Sainte-Marie-la-Mauderne, a stage adaptation of the film, was staged by Théâtre Gilles-Vigneault in 2022, with a cast including Fayolle Jean Jr. as Dr. Lewis, Michel Rivard as Germain Lesage, and Normand Brathwaite as Yvon.

== Critical response ==
On the review aggregator website Rotten Tomatoes, 69% of 62 critics' reviews are positive. The website's consensus reads: "A quirky and occasionally funny TV-sitcom blown up to feature length." Metacritic, which uses a weighted average, assigned the film a score of 59 out of 100, based on 24 critics, indicating "mixed or average" reviews.

In 2023, Barry Hertz of The Globe and Mail named the film as one of the 23 best Canadian comedy films ever made. It was also singled out in a sidebar as a favourite film of comedian Mark Critch.

== See also ==
- The Truman Show, 1998 film
