= Carmen Bourassa =

French Canadian television producer (1942–2021)

- Born: 1942; Trois-Rivières, Quebec, Canada
- Died: 25 December 2021 (aged 79)
- Occupation: Television producer
- Known for: Passe-Partout; Pin-Pon; Toc toc toc

Carmen Bourassa (1942 – 25 December 2021) was a French Canadian television producer from Trois-Rivières, Quebec. Throughout her career, she worked on a number of children's television series, including Passe-Partout, Pin-Pon, and Toc toc toc. She was awarded the Prix Gémeaux in 2009. Bourassa died on 25 December 2021.

== Life and career ==
Bourassa was born the oldest of seven children in Trois-Rivières in 1942 and attended the École normale du Christ-Roi, from where she graduated with a teaching certificate in 1963. She taught for a year before being recruited by the Ministry of education of Quebec, where she led the movement to introduce educational television programs for children in schools. This effort contributed to the creation of the series Passe-Partout, on which Bourassa worked together with Louise Poliquin and Laurent Lachance, between 1977 and 1991.

Speaking with Le Nouvelliste in 2009, Bourassa explained that she specialized in shows focused on childhood education. Her later work included the series Graffiti on Télé-Québec, from 1992 to 1995; and Zap, also on Télé-Quebec, from 1993 to 1996. In 1996, she joined Telefiction, where she worked on such shows as Pin-Pon (1996–2000), Cornemuse (1999–2003), Ayoye! (2001–2003), Toc toc toc (2007–2014), 1,2,3... géant! (2014–2021), and Salmigondis (2015–2021).

Bourassa died on 25 December 2021, at the age of 79.

== Selected work ==
- Passe-Partout (1977–1991)
- Graffiti (1992–1995)
- Zap (1993–1996)
- Pin-Pon (1996–2000)
- Cornemuse (1999–2003)
- Ayoye! (2001–2003)
- Toc toc toc (2007–2014)
- 1,2,3... géant! (2014–2021)
- Salmigondis (2015–2021)

== Awards ==
- Prix Gémeaux (2009)
