= Bruce Chun =

Canadian cinematographer

Bruce Chun (born February 6, 1963, in Mexico City, Mexico) is a Canadian cinematographer.

Chun was born to a Chinese Mexican family. He won (along with Jean-Pierre St. Louis) the 2002 Prix Gémeaux in the category of Best Cinematography - Dramatic for the La vie, La vie episode 150 degrés à l'ombre and earned nominations for the Genie Award for Best Achievement in Cinematography in 2007 for his work on Bon Cop, Bad Cop and in 2008 for Nitro. Chun is a member of the Canadian Society of Cinematographers.
