= Pin Pon =

Pin Pon may refer to:

- Pin-Pon (TV series), a 1990s Canadian children's television series,
- Pin-Pon: The Film, a 1999 film spinoff of the series,
- Pin Pon (2003 film), a 2003 Sri Lankan film.
