= Jérôme Sabourin =

Canadian cinematographer

Jérôme Sabourin is a Canadian cinematographer and documentary filmmaker, most noted as a three-time winner of the Gémeaux Award for Best Cinematography in a Drama Series.

He is the son of actor Marcel Sabourin. In 2019 he announced that he was entering production on At the End of Nothing at All (Au boute du rien pantoute), a documentary film about his father, as his directorial debut. The film premiered at the 2024 Rendez-vous Québec Cinéma.

== Filmography ==
=== Film ===
- Isolation - 1994
- The Little Varius (Le p'tit Varius) - 1999
- The Pig's Law (La Loi du cochon) - 2001
- Annie Brocoli dans les fonds marins - 2003
- Broil - 2006
- Trop chaud pour être hot - 2006
- Babine - 2008
- Free Fall (Les Pieds dans le vide) - 2009
- Rwanda, je me souviens - 2009
- The Canadiens, Forever (Pour toujours, Les Canadiens!) - 2009
- Blind Spot (Angle mort) - 2011
- Amsterdam - 2013
- La Garde - 2014
- King Dave - 2016
- It's the Heart That Dies Last (C'est le cœur qui meurt en dernier) - 2017
- Ourobouros - 2020
- Sam - 2021
- The Sum of Our Dreams (La Somme de nos rêves) - 2022
- The Secret Order (L'Ordre secret) - 2022
- At the End of Nothing at All (Au boute du rien pantoute) - 2024
- Fanny - 2025
- 125, rue des Malaises - 2026

=== Television ===
- Si la tendance se maintient - 2001
- Drop the Beat - 2000-01
- 3 x rien - 2003
- Winning - 2004
- Minuit, le soir - 2005-07
- Le Négociateur - 2005-06
- Le 7^{e} round - 2006
- Les Lavigueur, la vraie histoire - 2008
- Bob Gratton: Ma Vie, My Life - 2008-09
- Mirador - 2011
- 30 vies - 2011
- Trauma - 2010-13
- La Vie parfaite - 2013
- Au secours de Béatrice - 2014
- Mensonges - 2014-16
- Les Pays d'en haut - 2016-21
- Une Autre histoire - 2019
- Les Bracelets rouges - 2022
- Anna et Arnaud - 2022

== Awards ==
Award	Year	Category	Work	Result	Ref(s)
Gémeaux Awards	2005	Best Cinematography in a Drama Series (Meilleure direction photographique: Dramatique)	Minuit, le soir	Nominated	
Gémeaux Awards	2005	Best Cinematography in a Drama Series (Meilleure direction photographique: Dramatique)	Le Négociateur	Nominated	
Gémeaux Awards	2006	Best Cinematography in a Drama Series (Meilleure direction photographique: Dramatique)	Minuit, le soir Shared with Claudine Sauvé	Won	
Gémeaux Awards	2007	Best Cinematography in a Drama Series (Meilleure direction photographique: Dramatique)	Le Négociateur	Won	
Gémeaux Awards	2007	Best Cinematography in a Drama Series (Meilleure direction photographique: Dramatique)	Le 7^{e} round	Nominated	
Gémeaux Awards	2008	Best Cinematography in a Drama Series (Meilleure direction photographique: Dramatique)	Les Lavigueur, la vraie histoire	Nominated	
Gémeaux Awards	2012	Best Cinematography in a Drama Series (Meilleure direction photographique: Dramatique)	Mirador	Nominated	
Gémeaux Awards	2014	Best Cinematography in a Drama Series (Meilleure direction photographique: Dramatique)	Mensonges	Won	
Gémeaux Awards	2017	Best Cinematography in a Drama Series (Meilleure direction photographique: Dramatique)	Les Pays d'en haut	Nominated	
Gémeaux Awards	2018	Best Cinematography in a Drama Series (Meilleure direction photographique: Dramatique)	Les Pays d'en haut	Nominated	
