= Jouliks =

- Film poster
- Directed by: Mariloup Wolfe
- Written by: Marie-Christine Lê-Huu
- Produced by: Annie Blais; Claude Veillet
- Starring: Victor Andrés Trelles Turgeon; Jeanne Roux-Côté; Lilou Roy-Lanouette
- Cinematography: Jonathan Decoste
- Edited by: Carina Baccanale; Cédric Coussy
- Music by: Jean-Philippe Goncalves
- Production company: Les Films Vision 4
- Distributed by: Telefiction
- Release date: 16 August 2019 (Biscarosse)
- Running time: 114 minutes
- Country: Canada
- Languages: French; English

Jouliks is a 2019 Canadian drama film, directed by Mariloup Wolfe. An adaptation of the theatrical play by Marie-Christine Lê-Huu, the film centres on a bohemian couple, Zak (Victor Andrés Trelles Turgeon) and Véra (Jeanne Roux-Côté), who are raising their shy but observant young daughter Yanna (Lilou Roy-Lanouette) as squatters in an abandoned house.

The film faced some criticism from Roma activists, as the word "joulik", a Russian language word for "thug", has often been used as an ethnic slur against Roma people. Lê-Huu clarified that the play and film were not intended to be about Roma, but worked with the community to ensure that anything in the original play which could be perceived as reinforcing a stereotype of the Roma people was rewritten for clarity in the screenplay.

The film had its premiere on 16 October 2019, at the Festival de cinéma québécois de Biscarrosse, followed by a gala screening on 22 October at the Théâtre Maisonneuve in Montreal, before opening commercially on 1 November.

== Awards ==
The film received a Canadian Screen Award nomination for Best Overall Sound (Gavin Fernandes, Normand Lapierre) at the 8th Canadian Screen Awards, and three Prix Iris nominations for Revelation of the Year (Roy-Lanouette), Best Costume Design (Ginette Magny) and Best Makeup (Jeanne Lafond) at the 22nd Quebec Cinema Awards.
