= Mariloup Wolfe =

Canadian actress

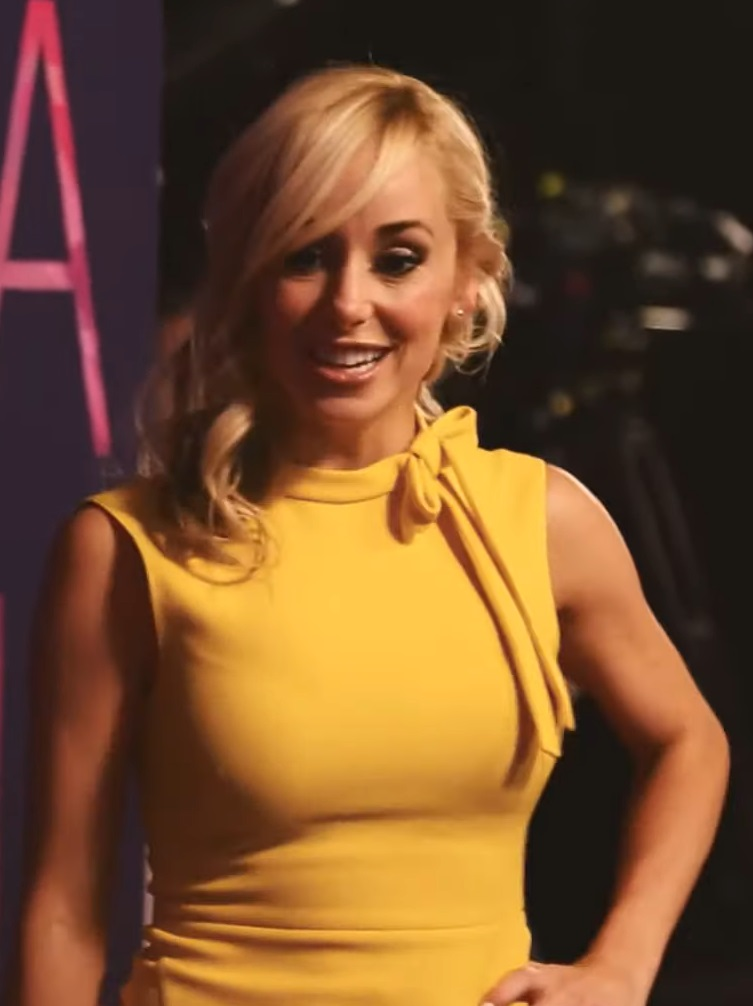
- Wolfe at Tapis rouge Gala du cinéma québécois 2016
- Born: 3 January 1978 (age 48); Montreal, Quebec, Canada
- Education: Concordia University
- Occupations: Actress; film director
- Spouse: Guillaume Lemay-Thivierge (2006–2015)
- Children: 2

Mariloup Wolfe (born 3 January 1978) is a Canadian actress and film director. She went to F.A.C.E. School, an art school in Montreal. She holds a major in Film Production from Concordia University (2001) and a minor in Cultural Studies from McGill University (1999). Mariloup Wolfe became famous through her role as Marianne in the popular TV series Ramdam broadcast since 2001 on Télé-Québec.

== Personal life ==
She was in a relationship with actor Guillaume Lemay-Thivierge. They have two sons Manoé and Miro Lemay-Thivierge. They announced their separation on 13 November 2015.

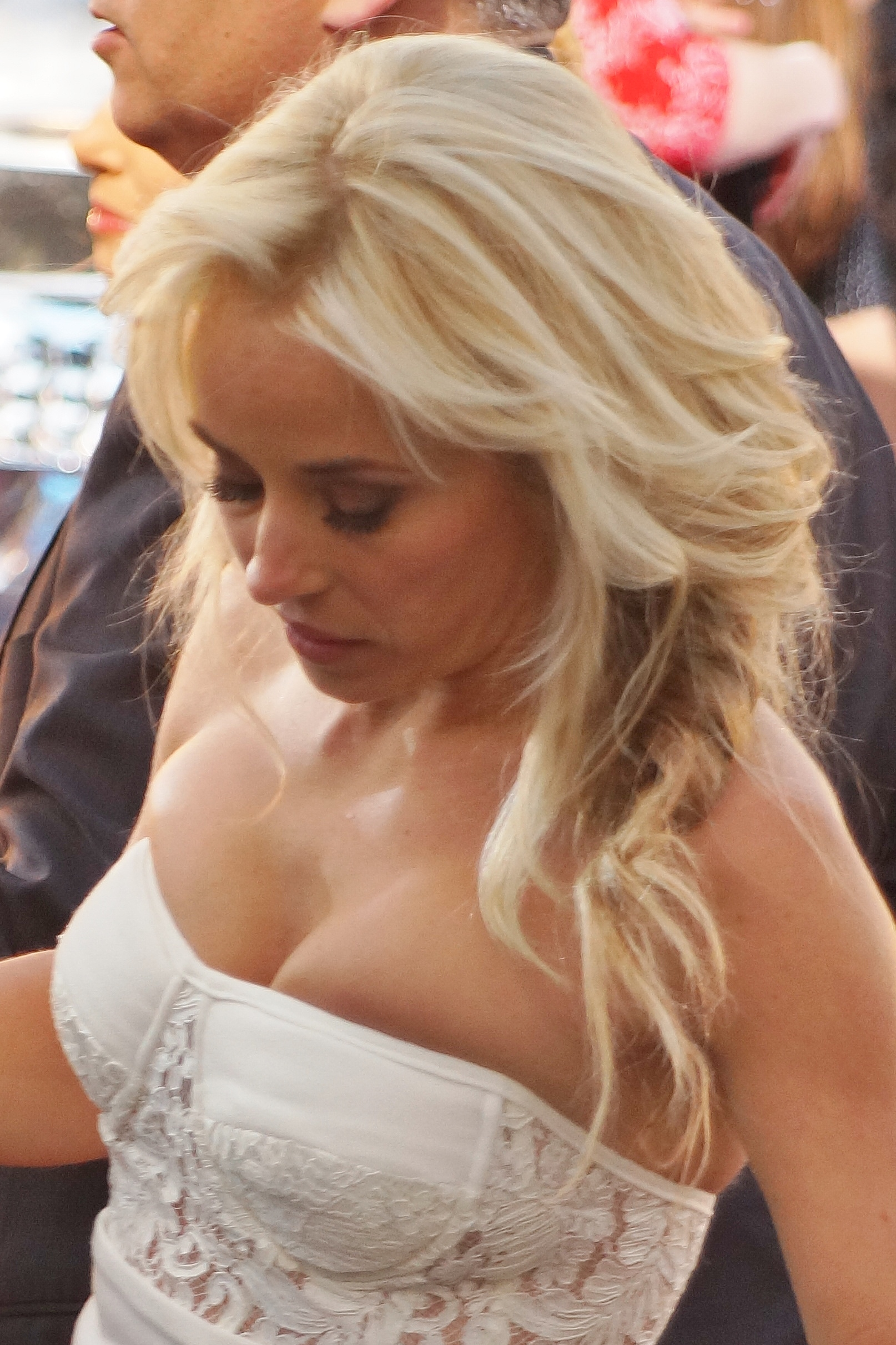
Mariloup Wolfe, Tapis Rouge, Gala Artis 2014, Sony A57, Montréal, 27 avril 2014

== Filmography ==
=== Film roles ===
- 2001 : The Favourite Game, Shell look-alike
- 2002 : Cul-de-sac, Victoire
- 2004 : C.R.A.Z.Y., Brigitte
- 2004 : À part des autres, Nellie
- 2005 : From My Window, Without a Home… (De ma fenêtre, sans maison), Sylvie
- 2007 : Taking the Plunge (À vos marques... party!), Sandrine Meilleur
- 2007 : Surf's Up (Les rois du surf) (animation), voice (lead)
- 2009 : Taking the Plunge 2 (À vos marques... party! 2), Sandrine Meilleur
- 2010 : Toy Story 3 (animation), voice of Barbie in Quebec version (Histoire de jouet 3)
- 2015: Snowtime! (La Guerre des tuques 3D) – Sophie

=== TV series roles ===
- 1999 : Tag, Camilla
- 1999-00 : 2 frères, Ariane Aubry
- 2000 : Caserne 24, Marie-Ève
- 2000 : Km/h (III), Julie
- 2001–08 : Ramdam, Marianne
- 2002 : Fred-DY (II), Élise Désy
- 2002 : Le plateau, Patineuse artistique
- 2002 : Jean Duceppe, Denise Pelletier
- 2003 : 3X Rien, Sonia
- 2006 : Il était une fois dans le trouble, Sabrina
- 2007 : C.A., Marie-Pierre
- 2007–08 : Fais ça court!, host (autumn 2007 – winter 2008)
- 2010 : Musée Éden, Camille Courval
- 2012-17 : Unité 9, Agent Agathe

=== Director ===
- 2001: Fly fly (short film)
- 2004: Trois petits coups (short film)
- 2008: Free Fall (Les Pieds dans le vide) (full-length film)
- 2019: Jouliks
- 2022: Arlette
- 2023: Billie Blue (Cœur de slush)

== Awards and nominations ==
=== Prizes ===
- 2005 : Prix MetroStar : Youth artiste for Ramdam
- 2007 : Prix Artis : Youth artiste
- 2007 : Prix KARV : Best mother
- 2007 : Prix KARV : Coolest Québécois personality
- 2007 : Prix Gémeaux : Best leading youth role for Ramdam
- 2008 : Prix Artis : Youth artiste

=== Nominations ===
- 2004 : Nomination Prix MetroStar : Youth artiste for Ramdam
- 2006 : Nomination Prix Artis : Youth artiste for Ramdam
- 2004 : Nomination Prix Gémeaux : Best leading youth role for Ramdam
