= Geneviève Schmidt =

Canadian actress (born 1978)

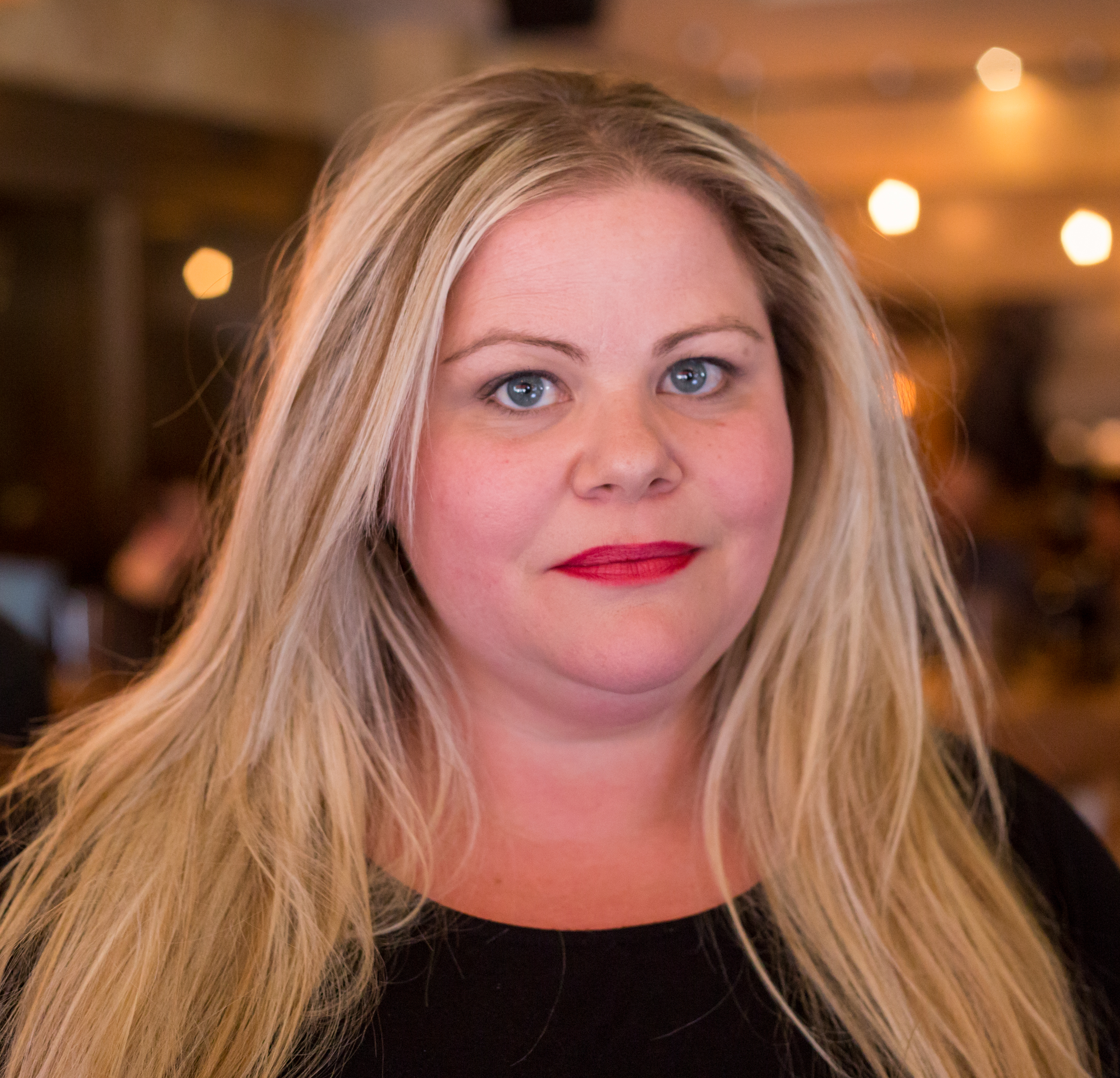
- Born: October 19, 1978 (age 47)
- Occupation: Actress
- Years active: 2000s-present

Geneviève Schmidt (born October 19, 1978) is a Canadian actress. She is most noted for her performance in the film Compulsive Liar (Menteur), for which she was nominated for Best Supporting Actress at the 22nd Quebec Cinema Awards in 2020.

She has also appeared in the films Paul à Québec, Kiss Me Like a Lover (Embrasse-moi comme tu m'aimes), Threesome (Le Trip à trois), The Fall of the American Empire (La Chute de l'empire américain), The Time Thief (L'Arracheuse de temps), Bungalow, Testament, Sisters and Neighbors! (Nos belles-sœurs), François.e and 125, rue des Malaises, the television series Les Hauts et les bas de Sophie Paquin, Trauma, Unité 9, Mensonges, Lâcher prise, District 31 and La Maison-Bleue, and roles on stage.

== Biography ==
Geneviève Schmidt grew up in the world of theater. Her parents managed the Théâtre des Cascades, and by the age of 10, she was already working as a stage manager. She discovered her passion for theater in high school and studied the craft for two years at Cégep de Sainte-Thérèse before being expelled, along with many other students. Still young, she began working in stage management, touring with René Richard Cyr.

In 2004, Schmidt accompanied a friend to an audition at the National Theatre School of Canada to act as her scene partner. Impressed by her performance, the school offered her a spot in the program; she remained at the school for four years, graduating in 2008. Schmidt then began working in theater and made several brief appearances in television series. She auditioned for the role of Caroline Laplante in the series Unité 9 but did not get the part. However, a few months later, the production contacted her to audition for the role of Jessica Poirier, which she successfully obtained.

In 2022, she landed the role of surgeon Isabelle Granger in the Quebec daily drama Stat. During the third season of the reality show L'île de l'amour (the Quebec version of Love Island) on TVA, she became the series narrator alongside new host Olivier Dion.

In 2026, she participated in the reality show Nuls en Chef, a culinary competition where 12 Quebec comedians with no cooking talent face off in various challenges.
