= Can You Hear Me? (2018 TV series) =

2018 French-language television series

- Genre: Comedy drama
- Created by: Florence Longpré
- Written by: Florence Longpré, Pascale Renaud-Hébert, Nicolas Michon
- Directed by: Miryam Bouchard
- Starring: Mélissa Bédard; Ève Landry; Florence Longpré
- Composers: Tim Rideout, Mathieu Vanasse
- Country of origin: Canada
- Original language: French
- No. of seasons: 3
- No. of episodes: 30

Production
- Production locations: Montreal, Quebec, Canada
- Running time: 23 minutes

Original release
- Network: Télé-Québec; Ici TOU.TV; Club Illico
- Release: December 15, 2018 – May 11, 2021

Can You Hear Me? (M'entends-tu?) is a Canadian French-language comedy drama television series created by and starring Florence Longpré, produced by Trio Orange for Télé-Québec. Co-starring Ève Landry and Mélissa Bédard, it follows three childhood friends living in poverty in Montreal, who cope with violence, trauma and family dysfunction and use singing as an emotional outlet. Directed by Miryam Bouchard, it premiered online in December 2018 and ran for three seasons and 30 episodes, ending in May 2021. The first season won five Prix Gémeaux in 2019, and the series was released internationally on Netflix in 2020.

== Cast ==
- Mélissa Bédard as Fabiola Noël
- Ève Landry as Carolanne Tremblay
- Florence Longpré as Ada Bartoletti
- Mehdi Bousaidan as Nassim
- Sophie Desmarais as Amélie
- Isabelle Brouillette as Bianca (Season 1-2; recurring Season 3)
- Victor Andrés Trelles Turgeon as Keven (Season 1-2, guest appearance Season 3)
- Marie-Aimée Cadet as Madan Torino
- Aliyah Elisme as Taïna/Bébé
- Fayolle Jean Jr. as Jean-Michel (Season 1)
- Guy Jodoin as Alain (Season 1)
- Christian Bégin as Pretzel (Season 1)
- Mani Soleymanlou as Frank (Season 2-3)
- Floyd Lapierre-Poupart as Henri (Season 2)
- Fabiola Nyrva Aladin as Tessa (Season 2-3)
- Marc St-Martin as Léon (Season 2-3)

== Synopsis ==
The series centers on three best friends who live in a low-income neighbourhood of Montreal, Quebec.

== Episodes ==
=== Series overview ===
Season	Episodes	Originally released	
Season	Episodes	First released	Last released
1	10	December 15, 2018	February 16, 2019
2	10	January 13, 2020	March 17, 2020
3	10	March 23, 2021	May 11, 2021

=== Season 1 (2018–19) ===
No. overall	No. in season	English title	French title	Original release date
1	1	"The Girls from the Block"	Les filles du bloc	December 15, 2018
Ada, struggling with controlling her anger, has difficulty regularly attending her court-ordered anger management therapy sessions, and is hostile to the idea of opening up to her therapist, Amélie. Her best friend, Carolann (nicknamed Caro), is struggling to suppress anxiety over an incident with her now ex-boyfriend Keven, which has left her extremely reclusive and reluctant to talk. Fabiola (Fabi for short) rounds out the trio of best friends; she is a shift lead at a burrito shop, is in a toxic, one-sided relationship with her co-worker Jean-Michel, and takes care for her invalid grandmother. The trio, downtrodden and living in a low-income neighbourhood of Montreal, will often resort to any means necessary to get money or other sorts of gratification, whether it is busking at a metro station or, in the case of Ada, prostituting herself. After a day spent hanging out around town, a text from Keven sends Caro into a severe panic attack, of which Ada uses the few tips she learns from therapy to help calm Caro down, while Fabi obtusely sings "Amazing Grace."
2	2	"Even If the Ground is Shaking"	Même si la terre tremble	December 22, 2018
Ada continues - albeit begrudgingly - her anger management therapy with Amélie. She also must contend with her mother Bianca, whose drug use renders her incapable of taking care of herself or the small apartment they both call home. She also continues to resort to her "by any means necessary" tactics to satisfy her wants and needs, as well as the wants and needs of those near and dear to her, such as Pretzel, a trans prostitute, and Marcel, a neighbourhood acquaintance who has a handy transport bicycle. Meanwhile, Fabi finds out her sister Valérie, also struggling with illicit drug abuse, has abandoned her daughter Bébé at her apartment, and must also act as temporary caretaker to both her niece and her grandmother. As for Caro, she routinely experiences flashbacks of a party where she suspects she may have gotten pregnant, and resorts to shoplifting pregnancy tests at a drugstore to verify this. It is also revealed that she is estranged from her family; her mother calls her to give family updates, but while Caro picks up, she does not respond, and abruptly hangs up mid-call.
3	3	"I Exist"	J'existe	December 29, 2018
The gang busk at a metro station to help Fabi with her audition for a community gospel choir that she dreams to be part of, however, the sexually explicit composition of Ada's fails to win over an audience. Caro is revealed to be pregnant, but while at a health centre seeking an abortion, she runs off. She attempts to call her mother, but when her abusive father - the reason Caro is estranged from her family - eavesdrops on the call, demanding where she is, Caro is triggered and hangs up. Ada continues her struggles to take care of her mother; when Pretzel - in a conversation with Ada - accidentally lets slip that Ada's mother is a sex worker who frequently gets in altercations with other prostitutes, Ada, who was only vaguely aware of this, is led to believe her father is a client of her mother. Fabi's audition goes well - with her singing an original song of hers - though her lack of confidence leads her to believe otherwise. The gang go to a bar to cheer Fabi up, where Ada unsuccessfully flirts with the new barman. Meanwhile, Fabi's sister, Valérie, returns to keep an eye on Bébé, but upon finding out Fabi threw out her drugs, Valérie experiences intense withdrawal symptoms and becomes maniacal, forcing Fabi to abruptly leave the bar. Ada, having dealt with similar situations with her mother, saves the day by offering a handjob to a bar patron in exchange for a taxi ride from the bar to Fabi's place, and showers cold water on Valérie, which forces her to sober up and calm down.
4	4	"Three Little Cats"	Trois petits chats	January 5, 2019
Ada confides in her friends what she learned about her mother. Fabi reminds her of her worth, and suggests finding a place of her own. Ada, worried over her mother, is initially hesitant, but warms up to the idea. After Caro reveals she is pregnant and attempted an abortion, Fabi's off-putting remarks lead Caro - who was supposed to babysit Bébé for a few hours - to storm off. With no one available, Ada offers to watch Bébé with her mother Bianca, which proves a great challenge. Caro reveals to Keven in a text message that she is pregnant, which enrages him. Ada finds a run-down apartment rental, and snags the space by having sex with the building superintendent, Alain. Following that, Ada receives a call from Caro that Keven is trying to break into her place under the guise of "wanting to talk about her pregnancy." Ada makes it over just as Keven breaks into the apartment and into Caro's room. Thanks to a serendipitous moment of a police siren wailing outside the apartment while Ada feigns a call to 911 on her dead cellphone, Keven is scared off, though not before physically assaulting both Caro and Ada. Meanwhile, Fabi misses out on her second audition for the community choir, after her sister Valérie, fails to show up to babysit Bébé, and Bébé falls ill. Ada's day is somewhat made better by running into Nassim, her bartender crush, who invites her to come play ping pong. However, that feeling of euphoria is quickly neutralized when Ada discovers Bianca has been evicted from their current apartment for failing to pay the rent.
5	5	"Our Silences"	Nos silences	January 12, 2019
Bianca and Ada move into the new apartment much sooner than expected. Alain, her new superintendent with whom she sleeps with to cover the rent, offers to pay her, and Ada is offended that he thinks of her as a prostitute. Following a failed busking session with Marcel, an impromptu session with Amélie, and a random encounter with Nassim, Ada seems to making progress personally (despite still giving in to her anger at times). At work, Fabi and Jean-Michel decide to have a little tryst in the staff room, but she accidentally breaks his nose while he is performing oral sex on her. Meanwhile, Caro is still debating whether to terminate her pregnancy, and Fabi's anti-abortion stance does not help the matter any further. Realizing she has no clean clothes at home, she goes to the laundromat, where she experiences a sudden miscarriage. Ada - who was helping Pretzel retrieve a rosary that fell through a sewer grate - and Fabi - waiting to get medical attention for Jean-Michel's broken nose at the pharmacy - receive word via phone call, and immediate rush to Caro's side to comfort her. Upon returning home, Ada runs into Alain, and feeling bold, decides to charge him for sex, but for more than what he initially offered.
6	6	"It's Not a Problem"	Spa grave	January 19, 2019
The trio enjoy a day trip to a spa. Ada has sex with one of the masseuses, but finds the quiet relaxation to be unnerving (though during a brief moment of sleep, Fabi and Caro draw a penis with permanent marker on her face). Fabi experiences a deep tissue massage for the first time, and manages to submerge herself into a cold dip pool. Caro gets over her fear of being touched and has a therapeutic foot massage, but her recent miscarriage and lingering memories of the party where she got pregnant lead her to overconsume (and throw up) the complementary champagne. Ada decides to take Caro to see Amélie, who helps Caro under duress from Ada (despite concerns about her professional reputation). Upon heading home, Ada crosses paths with Nassim with a mystery woman, and finds Alain in her apartment, who fixed her leaky faucet with the hope of sexual favours. When she initially refuses, he threatens to kick her and Bianca out of their place for not settling all their debts with him. With no way to properly pay him, Ada relents, and imagines a musical fantasy sequence of the trio at the spa to take her mind away from her present reality.
7	7	"Dying on Stage"	Mourir sur scène	January 26, 2019
While on her smoke break at work, Fabi physically assaults a passerby who greets her with a racial slur. Her boss, though understanding of the situation, is fed up of Ada's lackadaisical work ethic and poor leadership skills. Demanding that she see someone about changing her behaviour - and banning Ada and Caro from the restaurant - Fabi is given one more chance to keep her job. Meanwhile, Ada tries to secretly exit her apartment through her bathroom window to avoid Alain at her front door, but gets stuck, and it's Caro and Bianca who come to her rescue. Fabi - through Ada's aggressive insistence - speaks with Amélie (who relents, again) about the incident at work. While waiting for Fabi, Ada comes across Caro writing lyrics to a song. Caro, under duress from Ada, discloses the lyrics, which infer to be about Keven and her complicated relationship with him. Ada, angered by the revelation, demands that Caro stop thinking about him. After Fabi successfully gets Amélie to sign off on her behaviour change, the gang goes to the bar for a girls' night out. Jean-Michel arrives at the bar, but is shooed away by Fabi. Ada attempts to flirt once again with Nassim, but after she perceives his remarks as insults, she storms off, not before downing a whole pitcher of beer. Jean-Michel, observing the interaction, decides to make a move on an intoxicated Ada and kiss her. However, Fabi walks in on them, and slaps Jean-Michel after he makes light of the situation. Ada, embarrassed and still in a drunken stupor, runs off into an alley, where she discovers Pretzel's lifeless body buried under a mound of trash.
8	8	"I'll Be Thinking about You"	J'penserai à toi	February 2, 2019
The trio sneak into a cathedral to hold a memorial service for both Caro's unborn child and Pretzel, but it veers off course when Caro is overcome with emotion and runs off while singing a song composed by the trio, and Fabi and Ada argue over what happened between the latter and Jean-Michel. At work, Jean-Michel explains that he kissed Ada to make Fabi jealous, and offers her a necklace as penitence. Fabi accepts his apology and gift reservedly, reminding him that her trust in him is not all there. However, upon encountering him cheating again, she breaks up with him and disposes of the necklace. At her apartment, Ada gets angry that Bianca is painting the walls without consulting her, and as she storms off in a huff, she accidentally injures herself running into a fire hydrant while also evading Alain (wanting to apologize for his actions the other day). Heading off to the bar, Ada has a frank conversation with Nassim, which quickly morphs into flirting and a passionate make-out session (which she cuts short, afraid she will ruin him). Meanwhile, Caro, still emotional over her miscarriage and still visualizing moments from the party where she got pregnant, tries to sleep off the day, but because her roommate (and cousin) Karine is holding a house party and refuses to quiet down, Caro decides to join the party, getting intoxicated and dancing awkwardly. The trio all have a gaze at the starry night sky (though for Caro, it's glow-in-the-dark stars on her apartment ceiling) and come to the conclusion that not all is bad in the world.
9	9	"My Dad is the Best"	Le plus fort c'est mon père	February 9, 2019
Ada (with Marcel's help) serenades Fabi to apologize. At therapy, Amélie reminds Ada she needs to give up trying to control and being responsible for everyone in her life, and that while she hasn't made the best choices for herself, Ada is inherently a good person. Encouraged by the session, Ada finally decides to kick Bianca out of the apartment (which ends with Bianca verbally insulting her daughter, regretting bringing Ada into the world), and rebuffs all of Alain's attempts to woo her. Meanwhile, Fabi treats Jean-Michael as a persona non grata, and she is deeply concerned when Valérie comes to visit Bébé but doesn't bring her to daycare and still appears to be using drugs. Outside her family home, Caro tries to gather courage to talk to her father. Unable to say anything as he gaslights and mocks her, she successfully manages to implore her mother Line to leave him. While the trio are at the bar, drinking away the intensity of the day, Ada and Fabi overhear Caro in the bathroom, in an angry phone call with Keven. There, they find out that Caro was gang raped at a party while she was unconscious (explaining her recurring flashbacks and how she got pregnant), while Keven - under the influence of drugs - stood by and did nothing. Ada becomes murderously angry at Keven, and, unable to control her emotions, splashes beer into Nassim's face when she sees him chatting to a female patron, wrongly assuming he is flirting with her.
10	10	"We Were Beautiful"	On était beau	February 16, 2019
Ada returns to her apartment in a drunken stupor, still greatly worried about Caro and what to do to protect her. Fabi and Caro come over to help her sober up, and Ada and Fabi suggest that Caro go to the police to report Keven's abuse and her rape. Caro warms to the idea, but hesitates and ends up not following through. Before her last visit with Amélie, Ada encounters Nassim, who tells her that despite his conflicting feelings about her, she makes him happy. At their last session together, Amélie reminds Ada to make good decisions for herself and no one else. However, almost immediately following the conclusion of their sessions, Ada encounters Keven, gives in to her fury at and leads him to her apartment - under the guise of Caro being there and needing his help - and viciously assaults him, of which she is arrested, convicted and sentenced to prison. Nassim, thinking she has ghosted him again, discovers the truth from a newspaper headline. Fabi visits Ada in prison, furious at her still-lingering immaturity, and despite Ada's pleas to stay and talk a little longer, Fabi abruptly leaves.

=== Season 2 (2020) ===
No. overall	No. in season	French title	Original release date
11	1	"Ada"	January 13, 2020
After spending two tortuous years in prison, with none of her friends and family coming to visit her (with the exception of her former therapist Amélie), Ada is released and moves into a halfway house. With both Fabi and Caro refusing to speak to her after her assault on Keven - which resulted in Ada's imprisonment - she hits rockbottom. Flashbacks of how the gang of three met as children are interspersed with Ada's attempt to self-harm, though the singing of Tessa, a fellow halfway housemate whose soothing voice reminds Ada of Fabi, foils her plans. Tessa and Ada become fast friends, and Ada's spirit is rejuvenated with Tessa's presence in her life. Tessa then leaves the halfway house after some time, reminding Ada to get her problems sorted. A stroll in her old stomping grounds reminds Ada of her former flame Nassim as she passes the pub, and a distant supermarket encounter of Caro looking dejected and sporting a bruised eye greatly concerns Ada, who finds her way to Fabi's apartment to try to get her to help Caro.
12	2	"Fabiola"	January 20, 2020
Fabi's life is on an upswing: she quit her old job and is now a beneficiary attendant for Henri, a young, jovial quadriplegic. She is the primary guardian of her niece Bébé, and she is a star member of the community choir she had auditioned for several years prior. Despite this, Fabi is estranged from Ada, and any attempts at contacting Caro fail. At choir rehearsal, Fabi has an awkward introduction to new member Léon, who is enamoured with her looks and her voice and wishes to ask her out (of which his advances are rebuffed). Upon returning home, Fabi is surprised by her sister Valérie, who, despite having ghosted Fabi and Bébé for a year, claims she has quit her drug habit, found stable housing, and wants to be in Bébé's life. Initially unreceptive and outright unwilling to her sister's request, Fabi warms up to the idea but isn't fully convinced. After Valérie leaves, an interspersed scene shows how Ada came into possession of her turtle, an animal that Fabi now takes care of. Ada shows up unannounced at Fabi's door to inform her about Caro, thus revealing that the events of the previous episode converged with the timeline of this episode.
13	3	"Carolanne"	January 27, 2020
Caro continues to experience physical and verbal abuse from Keven since getting back together with him, which is exacerbated when the police are called to investigate a report of a domestic disturbance at their place. Keven leaves to cool off his anger, while Caro goes to her job at a local bookstore, owned by an elderly, benevolent man named Hans, who can infer from afar that all's not well in Caro's life. After an afternoon spent with her mother at the bar and a trip to the grocery store (the same grocery store where she is spotted by Ada from afar, thus revealing this episode also has a converging timeline with the previous two), along with interspersed scenes of the trio as children busking, Caro is surprised with a romantic dinner by Keven, which leads to them having passionate sex. However, after letting slip that she met her mom for a drink, Keven once again becomes enraged and gaslights Caro into thinking her mother is a poor influence and that drinking one beer will lead Caro into an alcoholic spiral. She then receives an unexpected text from Fabi, needing her urgent help.
14	4	"Enfin (English: Finally)"	February 3, 2020
Fabi and Ada slowly rebuild their friendship, and figure out a way to help Caro. Ada suggests that Fabi feign an emergency and require Caro to help, which Fabi does, and Caro acknowledges, but does not respond. A visit to Caro's cousin Karine informs the duo that Caro moved back in with Keven, and that she works at a bookstore whose logo features an anchor. After looking high and low throughout the neighbourhood, Ada and Fabi find Caro's workplace, and ask Hans to relay a message to Caro (hiding in the back) that they love and miss her, and for her to come hang out at the bar in the evening. Caro manages to sneak out - under the ruse that she forgot something at work - but cannot bring herself to physically enter the bar, as the fact that Ada is back in her life still angers her. Fabi attempts to mediate, and Ada offers space between them. Being in an emotional state, the trio awkwardly embrace, unaware that Keven had followed Caro out of the apartment, spying on her and disgusted by Caro's white lie.
15	5	"Bianca"	February 10, 2020
Fabi continues to act as primary caregiver for Bébé, but is still hesitant to allow Valérie back into the picture, refusing to answer her calls for a visit. Caro is once again subject to Keven's physical and verbal violence, after he finds out she snuck out to hang out with Fabi and Ada, but avoids further harm with a lucky break out of the apartment. With nowhere to go and no one to turn to, Caro attempts to visit her mother, but her father refuses entry or contact. At a local diner, Caro encounters Bianca, Ada's estranged mother, who works there. In their conversation, Bianca still holds a grudge against Ada for everything that has happened to her over the last two years and considers Ada's prison sentence as a comeuppance, expressing gladness that Ada received no visits. After a childhood flashback of Ada standing up to Caro's father, Caro finally decides to go to Fabi's apartment and admit that Ada being back in her life is creating conflict and confusion. Meanwhile, Ada meets Amélie for an unsanctioned appointment to seek advice on how to get Caro to leave Keven. Amélie reminds Ada that the decisions are not hers to make, but to guide Caro in the right direction so she makes that decision to leave. Ada runs into Nassim at the bar, but when she offers her apologies, he coldly rebuffs any chance of reconciliation. After an encounter with a staff member results in Ada becoming verbally and physically violent, she is expelled from the halfway house. With nowhere to turn, Ada goes to Fabi's, is greeted by Caro, and breaks down. The three realize that they need each other more than ever.
16	6	"Marcel"	February 17, 2020
After getting expelled from the halfway house, Ada finds a new place, but her new roommate - Caro's cousin, Karine - has a personality that Ada feels certain to clash with. She also gets to better know Marcel, her socially awkward, soft-spoken friend who owns a delivery bike and has never been kissed. While at work, Fabi has a discussion with Henri that changes her viewpoint on love and relationships; at choir rehearsal, while she again rebuffs Léon's romantic pursuits, she quickly changes her mind and accepts his offer for a dinner date at his place. Meanwhile, at the bookstore where she works, Caro runs into Frank, the police officer who previously responded to the domestic disturbance call at her place. Despite his cryptic reminder to her that he can "help her with her pest problem," Caro is left uncomfortable. Not wanting the police to be involved, but also not wanting to incur Keven's wrath, Caro follows a trick her mom would use on her father, and laces Keven's beer with ground-up dramamine, which sends him into a deep sleep, allowing her to sneak out for a clandestine meetup with the gang at the bar. Fabi and Caro tease Ada for choosing to live with Karine, while Nassim - on shift at the bar - appears to have feelings for Ada again.
17	7	"Nassim"	February 25, 2020
Caro discovers Keven still fast asleep the morning after her night out with the gang. Worried that she laced his beer with too much dramamine, she calls her mother Line to help, albeit clandestinely. Line realizes why Caro did what she did, and has an emotional breakdown at the knowledge that she and her daughter both find themselves in toxic, abusive relationships. Fabi dolls herself up for her first date with Léon at his place, and encourages Bébé's aspirations of also being a choral singer. Ada unsuccessfully reconnects with her mother, as Bianca still harbours an intense grudge towards her daughter, and is still unable to own up to her failings at being a parent (as evidenced through a flashback). Ada also snags a job at a clothing store, despite challenges in producing a professional résumé. The day culminates with romance for the gang, as Ada makes up with Nassim, Fabi realizes she too has strong feelings for Léon, and Keven wakes from his slumber in a good mood (and decides to take Caro on a movie date).
18	8	"Line"	March 3, 2020
Ada and Nassim begin a high-intensity relationship of ambiguous status, where they are either having passionate sex or involved in a screaming match. Fabi attempts to understand why Caro remains with Keven, all the while implicitly imploring her to leave him. Conversely, Caro is unsure why Fabi continues to keep her sister Valérie at an arm's length from being able to see her daughter, Bébé. Line finally musters the strength to leave her husband and seeks refuge at a women's shelter. Ada, while at work, encounters Tessa, and they excitedly catch up on each other's lives. At the bar, Nassim confirms his romantic intentions to Ada. The inclusion of Tessa to the gang creates palpable jealously among Fabi and Caro. However, when Tessa reveals her vocal abilities, the negative energy dissipates. Upon arriving home, Fabi intends to pick up Bébé from her neighbour, but is informed that Valérie picked her up. Attempts to call Valérie lead to her voicemail, leading Fabi into distress.
19	9	"STOP STOP STOP"	March 10, 2020
Fabi spirals into a reclusive depression after Val suddenly takes de facto custody of Bébé and blocks all contact. Léon comes to console her, and while Fabi is initially standoffish to his attempts to empathize, she realizes that he isn't putting on an act. The two then end up having sex, where Léon confesses his love for Fabi for the first time. Despite her apparent progress in managing her anger, Ada still isn't fully able to restrain herself from episodes of violent rage. However, after an intense argument with Karine results in the TV being accidentally turned on, Ada realizes (through the help of what she watches) that she is more than capable of control. After one final abusive episode from Keven sends her over the edge, Caro finally calls the police to arrest him and issue a restraining order against him. The gang, along with Line, gather at Caro's for a celebratory dinner, but soon after their departure, Keven shows up at Caro's door with flowers and an apology, to which she immediately rebuffs.
20	10	"Keven"	March 17, 2020
Fabi, still distressed at having no contact with Bébé, receives a proposal from Léon to move in with him, which she warms to the idea. Valérie returns with Bébé, allowing Fabi custody, on the condition that she not be excluded from Bébé's life. Ada informally meets with Amélie over pizza, and is advised to break all contact with her mother, who is a negative influence over her. Amélie also reveals that she permits unsanctioned, pro bono meetings with Ada because she reminds her of someone in her life who she lost. Nassim, who finds himself falling deeper in love with Ada, takes her on a surprise trip to a lake, a place she has always wished to see but has never gone to visit. They go for a plunge in the water (though they are quickly forced out due to the shore being private property) and say they love each other for the first time. Caro's spirits are lifted now that she has left Keven - to which her bookstore boss Hans observes and is pleased to see - but after she firmly rejects Keven's grovelling and pleas to get back together once and for all, Keven refuses to accept the end of their relationship and viciously assaults Caro, rendering her unconscious. Keven is arrested and charged for breaching a restraining order and attempted murder, while Ada and Fabi, who were informed by Caro's mother Line, can only helplessly watch from behind police lines as Caro's bruised and battered body is taken away to the hospital.

=== Season 3 (2021) ===
No. overall	No. in season	French title	Original release date
21	1	"Attache à pain (English: Bread clip)"	March 23, 2021
After a romantic gesture goes awry, Léon is forced to use a bread bag twist tie instead of a ring to ask Fabi to marry him. At their wedding some time later, in front of all their family and friends - including Ada and Caro, who are Fabi's bridesmaids - they continue the gag, exchanging twist ties to wear on their ring fingers. At the reception, Ada and Caro perform an original composition for the newly married couple. However, despite the joyous occasion, Ada is not all there: her relationship with Nassim has recently ended after a tumultuous period; still not over him, Ada gets drunk, and after a late-night attempt to get back together with him is rebuffed, she heads home an emotional wreck. Caro, who is visibly walking with a cane, now lives with her mother Line back in her childhood home (which Line successfully won back from her abusive ex-husband as it was an inheritance of hers). Caro's long road to recovery has been arduous and difficult, but despite her achievements, she still experiences PTSD-like episodes of her abusive relationship with ex-Keven.
22	2	"Sac de chips (English: Bag of chips)"	March 23, 2021
Caro returns to academic studies, excited for what the future might bring her. Fabi now works at a nursing home, and despite the challenges, loves it there. Ada gets fired from her retail job and still finds herself standoffish with her roommate, Karine.
23	3	"Café filtre (English: Drip coffee)"	March 30, 2021
Fabi and Léon move into a new apartment in a more high-end neighbourhood. This, and Caro's commitment to school, make Ada feel isolated and left behind. Meanwhile, Ada and Karine continue to struggle to get along as roommates.
24	4	"Danse en ligne (English: Line dancing)"	March 30, 2021
Line, Caro's mother, is coming out her shell and involving herself in social activities. She invites her daughter to join her, but Caro is a little apprehensive. Ada strikes up a friendship -- though possibly more -- with someone who is just as broken as she is.
25	5	"Chapeau melon (English: Bowler hat)"	April 6, 2021
Léon, a social worker by trade, falls into deep distress when a woman under his care unexpectedly dies by suicide, and his sudden change in behaviour worries Fabi. Caro encounters someone from her recent past while spending the evening at a country bar. Ada's continued beef with Karine extends to her neighbours.
26	6	"Lapin lapin !!! (English: Bunny bunny!)"	April 13, 2021
As a way to get Fabi from constantly worrying about Léon and his unchanging state, the group goes to spend some time at Karine's family cabin. What is supposed to be a time of rest and relaxation turns into hijinks and horror and a life-changing revelation for Ada.
27	7	"Hot-Dog mou (English: Steamed hot dog)"	April 20, 2021
Four months after the cabin getaway, it is revealed that Ada is pregnant, but hasn't fully accepted her current reality. Her therapist, Amélie, gives her the sobering truth that she needs get her life in order. Caro starts seeing Frank, the police officer who helped her with her domestic violence case, and he reveals his feelings to her. Fabi takes advice from Ada about how to heal her fractured relationship with Léon.
28	8	"Crème glacée (English: Ice cream)"	April 27, 2021
The trio learns that Ada is going to have a baby girl. Caro slowly opens up to her new beau, Frank, about her feelings. Fabi struggles with a resident at work, but is slowly seeing improvements with Léon at home. Ada spends the day with Tessa talking about her pregnancy and lack of a love life, and decides to hook up with Dave.
29	9	"Dentier (English: Dentures)"	May 4, 2021
Caro decides to confront her dark past once and for all, so she can move on with her life. Ada has awkward run-ins with Nassim (whose paternity she confirms, but her conflicting feelings for him she conceals) and her mother Bianca (who is still freeloading off her daughter and has no interest in truly reconciling). Fabi has a breakthrough with a testy resident at work.
30	10	"Drame disco (English: Disco Drama)"	May 11, 2021
Caro has graduated from her academic program, and finally discloses to Frank that she loves him. Ada, worried about the lack of a father figure in her daughter's life, is reminded by Amélie in a therapy session that families are diverse, and her nearest and dearest are the family to her and her unborn child. Upon arriving home, Ada is chastised by Karine for not disclosing that she had a session with Amélie, but Ada responds with compassion and understanding, instead of the angry retorts she normally resorts to. The trio, joined by Tessa and Karine, attend Line's very first theatre performance, a rendition of Michel Tremblay's Albertine en cinq temps. Ada is emotionally moved by Line's monologue, and, following the conclusion of the play, she imagines a fantasy disco musical sequence, where she and the women she holds dear celebrate their familial bond. Stopping at Marcel's family convenience store on their way home, Ada and Karine are held up by an armed robber. While Marcel grapples with the robber, a shot is accidentally fired into Ada's chest, and despite being rushed to hospital, Ada dies. She turns into a personified spirit, observing from afar the immediate events that followed her untimely demise. Ada's ashes are scattered into a lake in the presence of her loved ones. A time jump into the not-too-distant future reveals that Marcel is still driving his delivery bike; Fabi and Léon are expecting a child of their own; Caro is now an educator; Karine has expanded her weed business; and Nassim struggles to raise his child as a single father. However, with the love and support of those who loved and cared for Ada, her daughter - named Mia - grows up (in another time jump) to become a successful attorney, with the spirit of her late mother never far away.

== Production ==
The series was an original idea by Florence Longpré, who co-wrote it with Pascale Renaud-Hébert and Nicolas Michon. Miryam Bouchard directed, and the music was by Tim Rideout and Mathieu Vanasse. Episodes of the first season were released on Télé-Québec's website beginning in December 2018 before the series aired on television in January 2019.

In October 2019, Trio Orange announced that Club illico, Netflix and ICI Tou.tv Extra had acquired the first season and that Netflix was also investing in the production of the second season which Télé-Québec would premiere on its platform and on television in January 2020.

== Release ==
The series premiered on Télé-Québec on December 15, 2018, and ran for three seasons, concluding in May 2021. The first two seasons of the show are distributed internationally through Netflix.

== Reception ==
A review of the series in a Quebec cultural journal described it as possibly the first intersectional Quebec series to achieve such success, and praised Sophie Desmarais's performance as the therapist.

== Accolades ==
At the 2019 Prix Gémeaux held on 12 and 15 September, the first season won five awards: best lead actress in a comedy (Longpré) best supporting actor in a comedy (Christian Bégin), best writing in a comedy (Longpré, Renaud-Hébert and Michon), best direction in a comedy (Bouchard) and best editing in fiction (Isabelle Desmarais). It also won best comedy at Séries Mania in 2019 and the Rockie Award for best non-English-language drama series at the Banff World Media Festival that year. According to the producer, Longpré won best lead actress in a comedy again in 2020, and the series won best comedy at the 2021 Gémeaux.
