= Marie-Christine Lê-Huu =

Canadian actress and playwright

Marie-Christine Lê-Huu is a Canadian actress and playwright from Quebec, born in 1980. She is most noted for her stage play Jouliks, which was a shortlisted nominee for the Governor General's Award for French-language drama at the 2005 Governor General's Awards and was adapted into a feature film by director Mariloup Wolfe in 2019.

Born and raised in Quebec City as the daughter of a Vietnamese immigrant father and a Québécoise mother, she is a graduate of the Conservatoire de musique et d'art dramatique du Québec. In addition to Jouliks, her other theatrical plays have included Faust, pantin du diable (1995), Les Enrobantes (1998), Chambres (1999), Les Disparus, chroniques de la cruauté (2002), Imago (2004), Une forêt dans la tête (2007), Le Voyage (2009), Ma mère est un poisson rouge (2014) and Je cherche une maison qui vous ressemble (2018).

As an actress she has been associated primarily with stage roles, although she has also performed in the television series Scoop (1995), 4 et demi... (1995), Cornemuse (1999), Toc Toc Toc (2007) and Victor Lessard (2017), and the films Polygraph (1996) and Les mots gelés (2009).

She is currently an acting teacher at the National Theatre School of Canada.
