= When I Will Be Gone =

- Original title: L'Âge de braise
- Directed by: Jacques Leduc
- Written by: Jacques Leduc; Jacques Marcotte
- Produced by: Luc Vandal
- Starring: Annie Girardot; France Castel; Pascale Bussières
- Cinematography: Pierre Letarte
- Edited by: Elisabeth Guido
- Music by: Jean Derôme
- Production companies: Les Productions du Lundi Matin; Sunday Films; National Film Board of Canada
- Distributed by: France Films
- Release date: April 27, 1998
- Running time: 81 minutes
- Countries: Canada; France
- Language: French

When I Will Be Gone (French: L'Âge de braise) is a Canadian drama film, directed by Jacques Leduc and released in 1998. The film stars Annie Girardot as Caroline Bonhomme, an elderly woman who is preparing for death.

The cast also includes France Castel, Pascale Bussières, Domini Blythe, Widemir Normil, Denise Bombardier, Mireille Métellus and Jean-Guy Bouchard. The film was inspired in part by the death of Leduc's own mother.

Pierre Letarte received a Jutra Award nomination for Best Cinematography at the 1st Jutra Awards in 1999.
