= Nitro Rush =

- Film poster
- Directed by: Alain DesRochers
- Written by: Martin Girard
- Produced by: Antonello Cozzolino
- Starring: Guillaume Lemay-Thivierge; Madeleine Péloquin; Antoine Desrochers
- Cinematography: Tobie Marier Robitaille
- Edited by: Éric Drouin
- Music by: FM Le Sieur
- Production company: Attraction Images
- Distributed by: Les Films Séville
- Release date: August 31, 2016
- Running time: 96 minutes
- Country: Canada
- Language: French

Nitro Rush is a Canadian action drama film, directed by Alain DesRochers and released in 2016. A sequel to his 2007 film Nitro, the film stars Guillaume Lemay-Thivierge reprising his role as Max, who is now in prison for murdering a police officer. One day a mysterious woman (Micheline Lanctôt) shows up to solicit his help in breaking up a criminal gang in which his son Théo (Antoine DesRochers) has gotten involved, leading him to break out of prison and join forces with gang leader Daphné (Madeleine Péloquin) to steal the formula for a new rave drug.

The film opened in theatres on August 31, 2016.

The film received four Prix Iris nominations at the 19th Quebec Cinema Awards in 2017, for Best Art Direction (Dominique Desrochers), Best Cinematography (Tobie Marier Robitaille), Best Makeup (Marlène Rouleau) and Best Sound (Stéphane Bergeron, Martin Desmarais and Marie-Claude Gagné).
