= Death Dive =

2015 Canadian film

- Film poster
- French: Le Scaphandrier
- Directed by: Alain Vézina
- Written by: Alain Vézina
- Produced by: Daniel Morin
- Starring: Éric Gagné; Édith Côté-Demers; Alexandre Landry; Raymond Bouchard; Béatrice Picard
- Cinematography: Jean Kavanagh
- Edited by: Marc Plana; Alain Baril
- Music by: Réjean Doyon
- Production company: Boréal Films
- Distributed by: Filmoption International
- Release date: February 20, 2015
- Running time: 78 minutes
- Country: Canada
- Language: French

Death Dive (French: Le Scaphandrier) is a Canadian horror film, directed by Alain Vézina and released in 2015. The film centres on a zombie invasion in a small town in the Gaspésie region of Quebec, spawned after a journalist tries to investigate the appearance of a mysterious ghost ship in the St. Lawrence River.

The film's cast includes Éric Gagné, Édith Côté-Demers, Alexandre Landry, Raymond Bouchard, Béatrice Picard, Jean-Guy Bouchard, Pascale Létourneau, Benoit Rousseau, Widemir Normil, Charles Dauphinais, Félix-Antoine Duval and Dominique Laniel.

It premiered in Quebec theatres in February 2015, and was subsequently screened at several international horror and fantasy film festivals, including the Sitges Film Festival. At the Torremolinos Fantastic Film Festival, it won the awards for Best Special Effects and Best Direction.

Joan-Patricia Parris and Mario Soucy received a Quebec Cinema Award nomination for Best Makeup at the 18th Quebec Cinema Awards in 2016.
