= Toc toc toc =

French Canadian children's television series

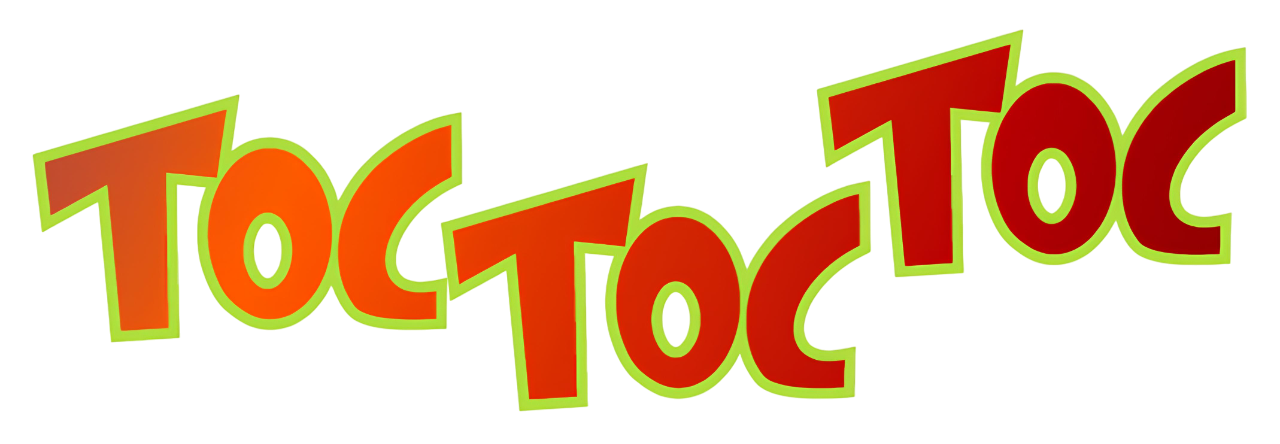
- Genre: Children's; Educational
- Created by: Paule Marier; Maryse Joncas; Carmen Bourassa; Lucie Veillet
- Written by: various
- Directed by: François Côté; Chantal Gagnon; Hélène Girard; Alain Jacques; Danièle Méthot; Pierre Théorêt; Johane Loranger
- Starring: Marie-Christine Lê-Huu; Frédéric Bélanger; Marc St-Martin; Audrey Rancourt-Lessard
- Composer: Sébastien Watty Langlois
- Country of origin: Canada
- Original language: French
- No. of seasons: 8
- No. of episodes: 520

Production
- Executive producers: Martine Quinty; Claude Veillet
- Producers: Carmen Bourassa; Lucie Veillet
- Editor: various
- Running time: 30 minutes
- Production company: Telefiction

Original release
- Network: Radio Canada (Canada); Télé-Québec (Quebec)
- Release: 10 September 2007 – 9 January 2015

Toc Toc Toc is a French Canadian children's educational television series produced by Telefiction and broadcast on Radio Canada and Télé-Québec. It was created by Paule Marier, Maryse Joncas, Carmen Bourassa, and Lucie Veillet. The show ran for eight seasons between 2007 and 2015, with a total of 520 episodes.

== Synopsis ==
Toc Toc Toc is a village surrounded by mountains with houses built from recycled materials, a rocket vehicle named Magli, and mystery doors that allow Alia, Youï, Kao, and Zalaé to travel around the world and discover seas, forests, deserts, and other mysteries. The children then return to their village and invent games and create stories, which they share with the adults, Azim, Babiouche, Musette, and Rabou. They also have to deal with the stern village station master, Mr. Craquepoutte.

== Cast and characters ==
- Marie-Christine Lê-Huu as Alia
- Frédéric Bélanger as Youï
- Marc St-Martin as Kao
- Audrey Rancourt-Lessard as Zalaé
- Claude Despins as Azim
- Nancy Gauthier as Babiouche
- Caroline Lavigne as Musette
- Paul Savoie as Rabou
- Denis Houle as Mr. Craquepoutte
