= May God Bless America =

- French: Que Dieu bénisse l'Amérique
- Directed by: Robert Morin
- Written by: Robert Morin
- Produced by: Réal Chabot
- Starring: Gildor Roy; Sylvie Léonard; Sylvain Marcel
- Cinematography: Jean-Pierre St-Louis
- Edited by: Lorraine Dufour
- Music by: Bertand Chénier
- Production company: Coop Vidéo de Montréal
- Distributed by: Christal Films
- Release date: February 17, 2006 (RVCQ)
- Running time: 110 minutes
- Country: Canada
- Language: French

May God Bless America (French: Que Dieu bénisse l'Amérique) is a Canadian drama film, directed by Robert Morin and released in 2006. A critique of suburban values and lifestyles, the film stars Gildor Roy as Maurice Ménard, a police inspector in Laval, Quebec who is investigating a spate of murders of suspected sex offenders on September 11, 2001, in a community that is largely wrapped up in its own petty dramas with virtually everybody remaining oblivious to or unconcerned about the concurrent September 11 attacks in New York City.

The cast also includes Normand D'Amour, René-Daniel Dubois, Patrice Dussault, Gaston Lepage, Sylvie Léonard, Sylvain Marcel, Dominique Quesnel, Jean-Guy Bouchard and Benoît Rousseau.

Morin described the film as having been inspired in part by Albert Camus's novel The Stranger, with themes around the danger of individuality taken to extremes.

The film premiered on February 17, 2006 at the Rendez-vous du cinéma québécois.

== Awards ==
Morin received a Prix Iris nomination for Best Screenplay at the 9th Jutra Awards in 2007.
