= Alain DesRochers =

Canadian film director and screenwriter

Alain Desrochers
- Occupations: Film director Screenwriter
- Years active: 1989 - Present

Alain Desrochers is a Canadian film director and screenwriter. Desrochers studied first at St-Jean-Sur-Richelieu College in the early 1980s and then at Concordia University earning himself a Bachelor of Fine Arts degree at the end of the decade.

He began his career by directing music videos and television commercials, garnering two Juno Award nominations for Music Video of the Year for his work on Mitsou's "Dis-moi, dis-moi" at the Juno Awards of 1992 and Susan Aglukark's "O Siem" at the Juno Awards of 1996.

He got his big break directing several episodes of the TV series The Hunger. His first feature film The Bottle (La Bouteille), released in 2000, earned him a Genie Award nomination for Best Director at the 21st Genie Awards.

His second feature, the action film Nitro, was very successful at the Quebec box office and beat out several American blockbusters in its opening weekend.

== Selected filmography ==
- The Bottle (La Bouteille) - 2000
- Nitro - 2007
- The Comeback (Cabotins) - 2010
- Wushu Warrior - 2010
- Gerry - 2011
- Darwin - 2015
- Nitro Rush - 2016
- Security - 2017
- Bon Cop, Bad Cop 2 - 2017
- Bad Blood - 2017
- Transplant - 2020 - episode #4-6: "Saleh"/"Eid"/"Trigger Warning"
