= Maryanne Zéhil =

Lebanese-Canadian film producer

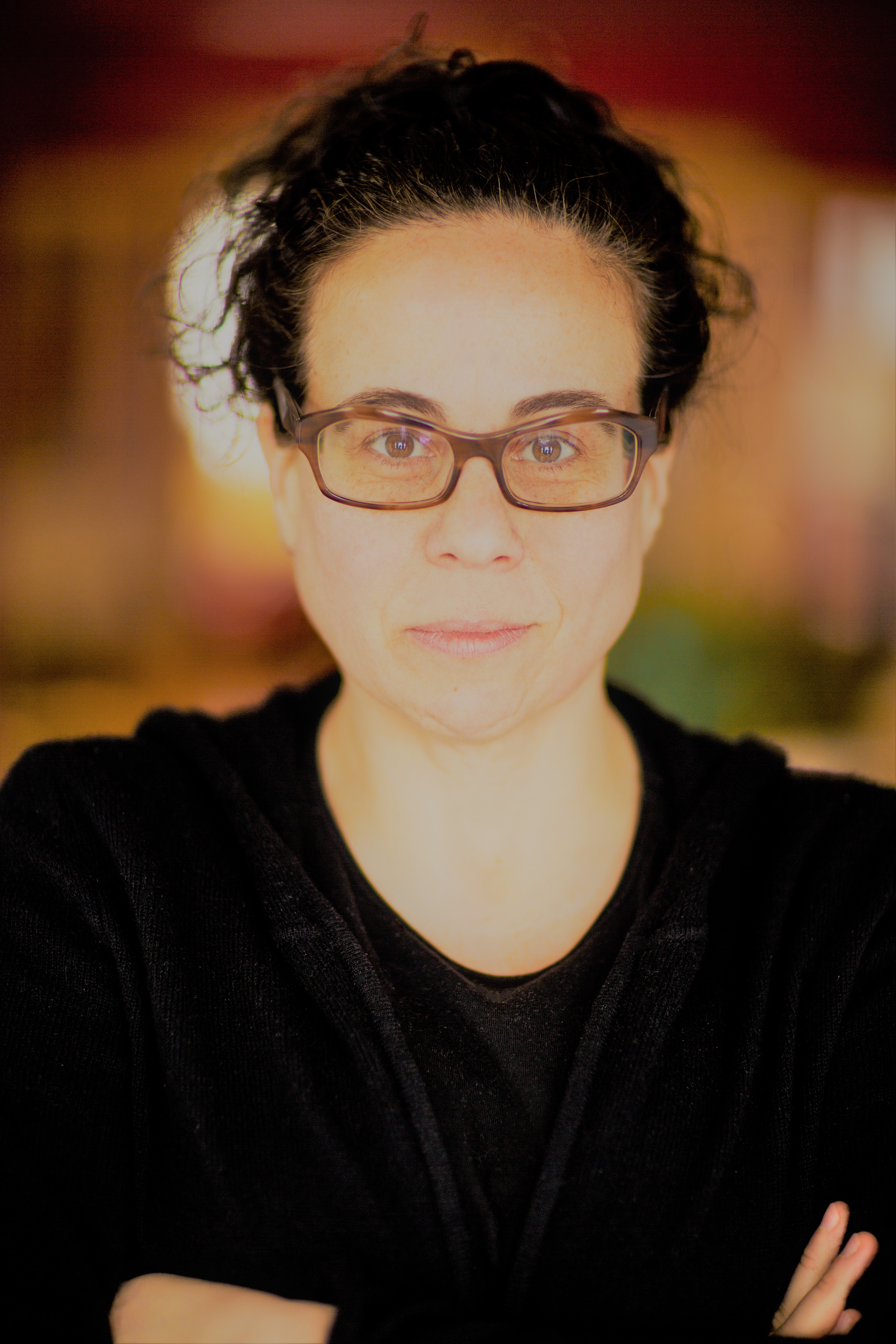
- Born: Beirut, Lebanon
- Citizenship: Canada
- Occupations: Producer, director, screenwriter and author
- Employer: Mia Productions
- Website: www.miaproductions.ca

Maryanne Zéhil is a Lebanese-Canadian film producer, director, screenwriter, and author. Born in Beirut, Lebanon, she has lived in Montreal, Quebec, since 1996.

She founded Mia Productions in 2000.

== Filmography ==
- From My Window, Without a Home… (De ma fenêtre, sans maison...) - 2006
- The Valley of Tears (La Vallée des larmes) - 2012
- The Other Side of November (L'Autre côté de novembre) - 2016
- The Sticky Side of Baklava (La Face cachée du baklava) - 2020
