= From My Window, Without a Home... =

- French: De ma fenêtre, sans maison...
- Directed by: Maryanne Zéhil
- Written by: Maryanne Zéhil
- Produced by: Maryanne Zéhil
- Starring: Louise Portal; Renée Thomas; Leyla Hakim; Walid El Alayli; Hélène Mercier; Jean-François Blanchard; Mariloup Wolfe; Catherine Colvey; Sébastien Ricard
- Cinematography: Nathalie Moliavko-Visotzky
- Edited by: Hélène Girard
- Music by: Jean Derome
- Production company: Mia Productions
- Distributed by: K-Films Amérique
- Release date: February 26, 2006 (Canada)
- Running time: 88 minutes
- Country: Canada
- Languages: French; Lebanese

From my Window, Without a Home... (French: De ma fenêtre, sans maison...) is a Quebec feature film produced, written and directed by Maryanne Zéhil. The film tells the story of a Lebanese woman who leaves her country and family to settle in Montreal. It features Louise Portal, Renée Thomas, Leyla Hakim, Walid El Alayli, Hélène Mercier, Jean-François Blanchard, Mariloup Wolfe, Catherine Colvey and Sébastien Ricard.

== Plot ==
At four years old, Dounia’s mother, Sana, emigrates to Canada, leaving her daughter behind in burning and bloody Beirut, Lebanon. Seventeen years later, after the death of her father, Dounia comes to Montreal to meet a mother she no longer remembers.

Once in Montreal, Dounia quickly realizes that her mother is a stranger to her. Sana avoids talking about the past, yet she is forced to confront it, little by little. Communication between the two women is awkward, and Dounia's stay is drawing to a close. It seems impossible for Sana to return to Beirut, yet circumstances provoke it. Returning to the homeland she once fled like the [plague, Sana has no choice but to face her past.

== Cast ==
- Louise Portal as Sana
- Renée Thomas as Dounia
- Leyla Hakim as Teta
- Walid Al Alayli as Akram
- Hélène Mercier as Hoda
- Jean-François Blanchard as Denis
- Mariloup Wolfe as Sylvie
- Catherine Colvey as Barbara
- Sébastien Ricard as Pierre
- Elias Elias as Paesant

== Release ==
The film premiered at the Rendez-vous Québec Cinéma on 26 February 2006.
