= The Pig's Law =

2001 Canadian drama film

- Film poster
- French: La Loi du cochon
- Directed by: Érik Canuel
- Written by: Joanne Arseneau
- Produced by: Jacques Bonin; Claude Veillet
- Starring: Isabel Richer; Catherine Trudeau; Sylvain Marcel
- Cinematography: Jérôme Sabourin
- Edited by: Jean-François Bergeron
- Music by: Dazmo
- Production companies: Les Films Vision 4; Cirrus Communications
- Distributed by: Alliance Atlantis
- Release date: 25 October 2001
- Running time: 98 minutes
- Country: Canada
- Language: French

The Pig's Law (French: La Loi du cochon) is a 2001 Canadian crime comedy-drama film, directed by Érik Canuel. The film stars Isabel Richer and Catherine Trudeau as Stéphane and Bettie Brousseau, two sisters running a struggling pig farm in rural Quebec; they have rented part of their land out to a criminal marijuana smuggling ring led by Paquette (Sylvain Marcel), but run afoul of the smugglers when Stéphane sells part of the crop herself without their knowledge to pay off her mortgage debt before the farm is foreclosed.

The film's cast also includes Christian Bégin, Jean-Nicolas Verreault, Stéphane Demers, Christopher Heyerdahl and Marie Brassard.

Richer received a Prix Jutra nomination for Best Actress at the 4th Jutra Awards.
