= Ève Landry =

Canadian actress

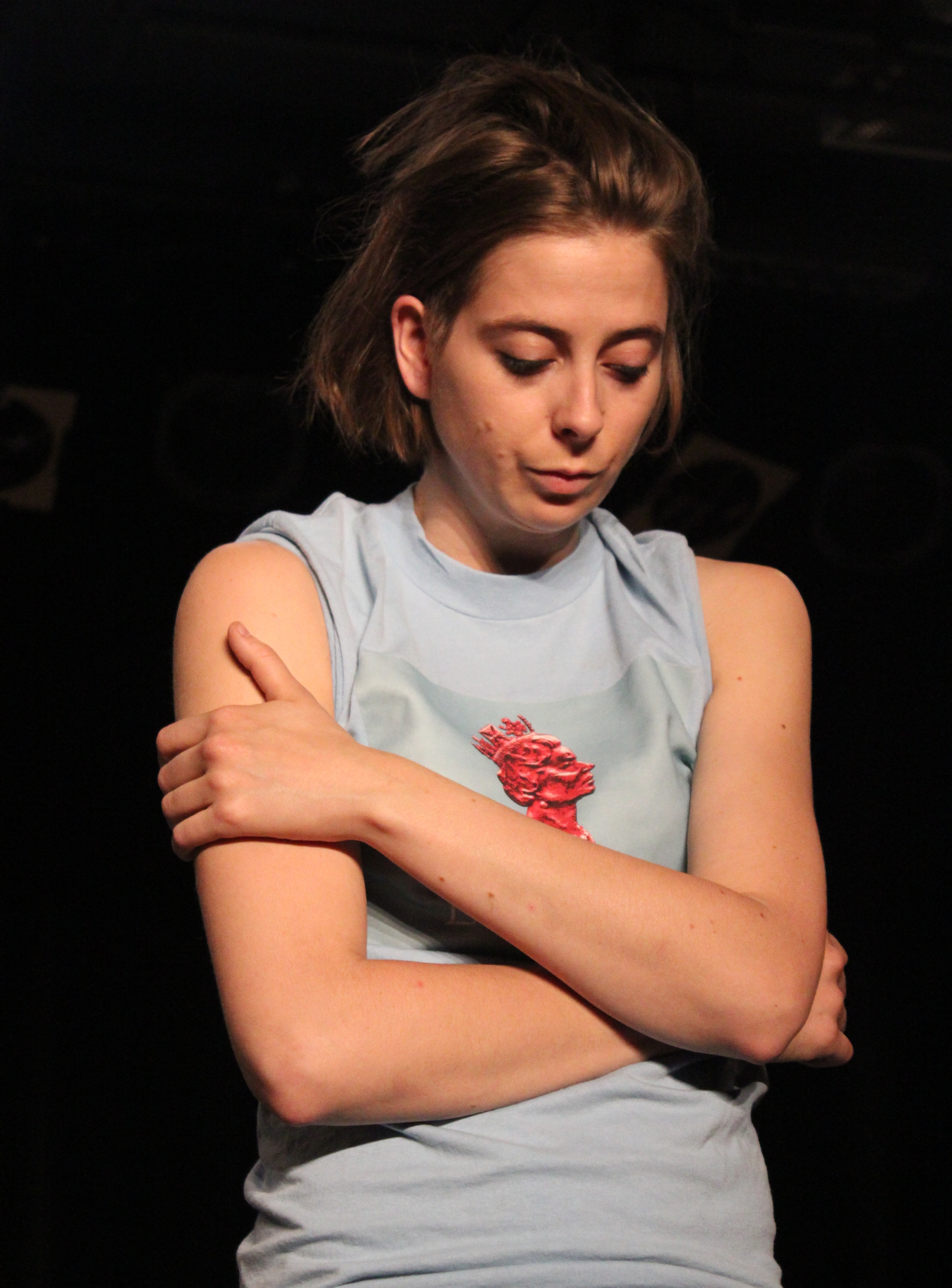
Ève Landry performing at Rivière-du-Loup.

Ève Landry (born June 5, 1985, in Saint-Pascal, Quebec) is a Canadian actress from Quebec. After a time at the Ligue nationale d'improvisation, she began to appear on TV in the Ici Radio-Canada Télé show Unité 9 in the bad girl character of Jeanne Biron.

She attended the Festival de Cannes to present the TV show at the MIPCOM.

She received a Prix Iris nomination for Best Supporting Actress at the 25th Quebec Cinema Awards in 2023 for her performance in the film Bungalow.

== Filmography ==
=== Television ===
- Musée Eden (2010) - Amie de Lucie Bolduc (1 episode)
- Penthouse 5-0 (2011) - Mylène (2 episodes)
- Mirador (2011) - Étudiante Vox pop (1 episode)
- Agent Secret (2014) - Francine (2 episodes)
- Unité 9 (2012–2019) - Jeanne Biron (main character)
- Épidémie (2020) - Françoise Dufour (7 episodes)
- Can You Hear Me? (M'entends tu?) (2018–2021) - Carolanne (main character)
- District 31 (2021–2022) - Mélanie Charron (100 episodes)

=== Film ===
- Bungalow - 2022
- Follies (Folichonneries) - 2025
