= The Little Varius =

1999 Canadian short film

- French: Le p'tit varius
- Directed by: Alain Jacques
- Written by: Alain Jacques
- Produced by: André Théberge; André Véronneau
- Starring: Samuel Robichaud; Paul Buissonneau; Pierre Mailloux
- Cinematography: Jérôme Sabourin
- Edited by: André Corriveau
- Music by: Bernard Duplessis; Normand Lefebvre
- Production company: Productions Magellan
- Release date: 1999
- Running time: 16 minutes
- Country: Canada
- Language: French

The Little Varius (French: Le p'tit varius) is a 1999 Canadian short independent film directed by Alain Jacques. The film centres on a bakery where young musician Mihai (Samuel Robichaud) has left his violin, leaving the owner (Paul Buissonneau) facing an ethical dilemma as he decides whether to return it to the musician or sell it to a wealthy businessman (Pierre Mailloux) who has offered a substantial amount of money for it.

The film won the Genie Award for Best Live Action Short Drama at the 21st Genie Awards.
