= 125, rue des Malaises =

2026 Canadian comedy-drama film

- Directed by: Louis Bélanger
- Written by: Louis Bélanger; Denise Robert
- Produced by: Denise Robert
- Starring: Rémy Girard; Geneviève Schmidt; Pier-Luc Funk; Claude Legault; Guylaine Tremblay
- Cinematography: Jérôme Sabourin
- Edited by: Claude Palardy
- Music by: Martin Roy; Simon Roy
- Production company: Cinémaginaire
- Distributed by: TVA Films
- Release date: July 6, 2026
- Running time: 94 minutes
- Country: Canada
- Language: French

125, rue des Malaises is a Canadian comedy-drama film, directed by Louis Bélanger and released in 2026. The film stars Rémy Girard as Laurent Perrier, a man in his 70s who invites his daughter Marie-Claude (Geneviève Schmidt) over to announce both that he has scheduled his death via medical assistance in dying, and that he has an illegitimate son, Jacob (Pier-Luc Funk) whom he never told her about.

The cast also includes Claude Legault as Laurent's neighbour Martin, and Guylaine Tremblay as Chantal Pitre, the notary with whom Laurent has prepared his will.

The film was made through a partially improvisational process, with the actors given a basic story outline but free to improvise much of their dialogue.

The film premiered on July 6, 2026, in Montreal, before opening commercially across Quebec on July 16. It passed the $1 million box office marker after ten days in theatres, and surpassed $2.5 million after a month.
