= The Years of Dreams and Revolt =

- French: Les Années de rêves
- Directed by: Jean-Claude Labrecque
- Written by: Jean-Claude Labrecque; Marie Laberge; Robert Gurik
- Produced by: Claude Bonin; François Labonté
- Starring: Gilbert Sicotte; Anne-Marie Provencher; Monique Mercure
- Cinematography: Alain Dostie
- Edited by: François Labonté
- Production company: Les Films Vision 4
- Release date: May 15, 1984 (Cannes)
- Running time: 96 minutes
- Country: Canada
- Language: French

The Years of Dreams and Revolt (French: Les Années de rêves) is a Canadian drama film, directed by Jean-Claude Labrecque and released in 1984. A sequel to his 1975 film The Vultures (Les Vautours), the film revisits the story of Louis Pelletier (Gilbert Sicotte) in the 1960s, from the time of his wedding to Claudette (Anne-Marie Provencher) in 1963 through to the time of the October Crisis in 1970.

The cast also includes Monique Mercure, Carmen Tremblay and Amulette Garneau, all reprising their roles as his aunts, as well as John Wildman, Roger Lebel, Lothaire Bluteau, Jean-Guy Bouchard and Guillaume Lemay-Thivierge.

The film premiered in the Directors' Fortnight stream at the 1984 Cannes Film Festival, before having its Canadian premiere at the 1984 Toronto International Film Festival.

Vianney Gauthier received a Genie Award nomination for Best Art Direction/Production Design at the 6th Genie Awards in 1985.
