= District 31 (TV series) =

Canadian French-language television series (2016–2022)

- Created by: Luc Dionne
- Starring: Vincent-Guillaume Otis; Michel Charette; Gildor Roy; Catherine St-Laurent; Catherine Proulx-Lemay; Ève Landry; Sébastien Huberdeau
- Country of origin: Canada
- Original language: French
- No. of seasons: 6
- No. of episodes: 716

Production
- Producers: Fabienne Larouche; Michel Trudeau
- Production locations: Montréal, Quebec, Canada
- Camera setup: Single camera
- Running time: 22 minutes
- Production company: AETIOS Productions

Original release
- Network: Ici Radio-Canada Télé
- Release: September 12, 2016 – April 21, 2022

District 31 is a Canadian French-language police procedural drama television series produced by AETIOS Productions, which aired on Ici Radio-Canada Télé from September 12, 2016 to April 21, 2022. The series was a police drama, set in a newly opened police district office in Montreal, Quebec.

The series was produced as a half-hour drama airing four episodes per week, making use of rotating story arcs in which storylines and characters would be foregrounded in some episodes and backgrounded in other episodes, in order to avoid overworking its cast and crew. The series aired a total of 716 episodes over its run.

== Cast ==
Due to the program's story arc format, it had a large and varying ensemble cast.

Core cast members at the show's premiere included Gildor Roy as police chief Daniel Chiasson, Magalie Lépine-Blondeau and Vincent-Guillaume Otis as investigators Nadine Legrand and Patrick Bissonnette, Patrick Labbé as sergeant detective Laurent Cloutier, Hélène Bourgeois Leclerc as sex crime investigator Isabelle Roy and Pascale Montpetit as prosecutor Sonia Blanchard.

Other primary cast members introduced later included Jeff Boudreault, Geneviève Brouillette, Michel Charette, Marc Fournier, Rémy Girard, Patrice Godin, Sébastien Huberdeau, Ève Landry, Luc Picard, Catherine Proulx-Lemay, Catherine St-Laurent and Cynthia Wu-Maheux.

Many other actors appeared in supporting or guest roles, including Christine Beaulieu, Dan Bigras, Denis Bouchard, David Boutin, Stéphane Breton, Pascale Bussières, Catherine De Léan, Sophie Desmarais, Paul Doucet, Yves Jacques, Peter Miller, Robert Naylor, Caroline Néron, Widemir Normil, Éric Paulhus, Ralph Prosper, Virginie Ranger-Beauregard, Gabriel Sabourin, Geneviève Schmidt and Jean-Nicolas Verreault.
