= Nitro (film) =

- Directed by: Alain DesRochers
- Written by: Alain DesRochers; Benoît Guichard
- Produced by: Pierre Even
- Starring: Guillaume Lemay-Thivierge; Lucie Laurier
- Cinematography: Bruce Chun
- Edited by: Éric Drouin
- Music by: FM Le Sieur
- Production company: Cirrus Communications
- Distributed by: Alliance Atlantis Vivafilm
- Release date: June 29, 2007
- Running time: 90 minutes
- Country: Canada
- Language: French

Nitro is a 2007 Canadian action drama film, directed by Alain DesRochers and co-written with Benoît Guichard which was released theatrically on June 29, 2007, exclusively in Quebec. Due to its popularity in its opening weekend, it ranked fifth at the Canadian box office. A sequel film, Nitro Rush, was released in 2016.

== Plot ==
Max (Guillaume Lemay-Thivierge) is a former Montreal-based illegal street racer who is forced to return to his criminal past when his girlfriend (Myriam Tallard) requires a heart transplant with Morgane (Lucie Laurier), a female drag racer who assists Max in his quest to locate a suitable organ for his girlfriend's surgery.

== Cast ==
- Guillaume Lemay-Thivierge as Max
- Lucie Laurier as Morgane
- Martin Matte as Avocat
- Raymond Bouchard as Meg
- Myriam Tallard as Alice
- Antoine DesRochers as Theo
- Tony Conte as Gino

== Awards ==
Award	Date of ceremony	Category	Recipient(s)	Result	Ref(s)
Genie Awards	28th Genie Awards	Best Cinematography	Bruce Chun	Nominated	
Genie Awards	28th Genie Awards	Best Sound Editing	Martin Pinsonnault, Pierre-Jules Audet, Michelle Cloutier, Simon Meilleur, Louis Molinas	Nominated	
Prix Iris	10th Jutra Awards	Best Actor	Guillaume Lemay-Thivierge	Nominated	
Prix Iris	10th Jutra Awards	Best Cinematography	Bruce Chun	Nominated	
Prix Iris	10th Jutra Awards	Best Editing	Éric Drouin	Won	
Prix Iris	10th Jutra Awards	Best Hair	Denis Parent	Nominated	
Prix Iris	10th Jutra Awards	Best Makeup	Johanne Gravel	Nominated	
Prix Iris	10th Jutra Awards	Best Original Music	FM Le Sieur	Nominated	
