= Jean-Guy Bouchard =

Canadian actor

- Born: Quebec, Canada
- Education: National Theatre School of Canada
- Occupation: Actor
- Notable work: Requiem for a Handsome Bastard, Phantom Life, Karmina, The Revenge of the Woman in Black, It's Your Turn, Laura Cadieux, The Sleep Room, Post Mortem, The Collector, May God Bless America, Thrill of the Hills, French Immersion, Death Dive, Boundaries, Goodbye Happiness
- Awards: Genie Award nomination for Best Supporting Actor

Jean-Guy Bouchard is a Canadian actor from Quebec. He is most noted for his role as Tonio in the film Requiem for a Handsome Bastard (Requiem pour un beau sans-coeur), for which he received a Genie Award nomination for Best Supporting Actor at the 13th Genie Awards in 1992.

== Career ==
A 1979 graduate of the National Theatre School of Canada, Bouchard began his acting career in 1980 in a production of David Fennario's play Nothing to Lose.

His other credits have included the films The Years of Dreams and Revolt (Les Années de rêves), Phantom Life (La Vie fantôme), Karmina, Heads or Tails (J'en suis !), The Revenge of the Woman in Black (La Vengeance de la femme en noir), It's Your Turn, Laura Cadieux (C't'à ton tour, Laura Cadieux), The Sleep Room, When I Will Be Gone (L'Âge de braise), Post Mortem, The Collector (Le Collectionneur), The Negro (Le Nèg'), May God Bless America (Que Dieu bénisse l'Amérique), Thrill of the Hills (Frisson des collines), French Immersion, Death Dive (Le Scaphandrier) and Boundaries (Pays).

On stage he is most noted for Centaur Theatre's 2000 production of Michel Tremblay's For the Pleasure of Seeing Her Again at the Arena Stage in Washington, D.C., and for the 2018 production of Fabien Cloutier's Bonne retraite, Jocelyne. He has also translated foreign-language plays into French for production on Quebec stages, most notably Paul Pörtner's Shear Madness in 1988.

== Filmography ==
=== Film ===
Year	Title	Role	Notes
1984	The Years of Dreams and Revolt (Les Années de rêves)	Un détective	
1988	The Carpenter	Worker	
1992	Phantom Life (La Vie fantôme)	Le Voisin	
1992	Requiem for a Handsome Bastard (Requiem pour un beau sans-cœur)	Tonio	
1996	Karmina	Policier #1	
1997	The Revenge of the Woman in Black (La vengeance de la femme en noir)	Enquêteur déprimé	
1997	Strip Search	Joe	
1997	Heads or Tails (J'en suis!)		
1998	The Sleep Room	Mr. Beers	
1998	When I Will Be Gone (L'âge de braise)	Déménageur 1	
1998	It's Your Turn, Laura Cadieux (C't'à ton tour, Laura Cadieux)	Pit Cadieux	
1999	Requiem for Murder	Patrolman #2	
1999	Post Mortem	Police Officer	
1999	Laura Cadieux II (Laura Cadieux...la suite)	Pit Cadieux	
2000	Isn't She Great	Wolf-whistle Teamster	
2000	Press Run	Hotel Guard	
2000	The Whole Nine Yards	Mover	
2000	The Three Madeleines (Les fantômes des trois Madeleines)	Bob, Mado's neighbour	
2002	The Collector (Le Collectionneur)	Journaliste	
2002	The Negro (Le Nèg')	Bertrand	
2004	The Cop, the Criminal and the Clown (C'est pas moi, c'est l'autre)	Bob	
2006	May God Bless America (Que Dieu bénisse l'Amérique)	Père resto chinois	
2006	Cadavre exquis première édition	Méphisto / Chauffeur du taxi	
2008	Caido	Dr. Georges	
2009	A Cargo to Africa (Un cargo pour l'Afrique)	Tattooed man	
2010	File 13 (Filière 13)	Déménageur	
2011	Thrill of the Hills (Frisson des collines)	Viateur Thibault	
2011	French Immersion	Euclide Tremblay	
2015	Death Dive (Le Scaphandrier)	Félix Lamontagne	
2016	Boundaries (Pays)	Raymond	
2019	Little Waves (Les petites vagues)		
2021	Goodbye Happiness (Au revoir le bonheur)	Homme à tout faire	
2024	Mercenaire	Michel	
2025	Montreal, My Beautiful (Montréal, ma belle)		

=== Television ===
Year	Title	Role	Notes
1981	Les Brillant	Policier	Episode: "L'oncle Conrad"
1982–1984	Terre humaine	Policier	3 episodes
1986	He Shoots, He Scores	Paul, le portier	Episode #1.4
1988	Le monde selon Croc	Various roles	5 episodes
1990	Haute tension	Gardien de Delaunay	Episode: "Pour cent millions"
1990	Les Filles de Caleb	Loustic	Episode #1.2
1991	Urban Angel	Quebec Farmer #1	2 episodes
1992	Chambres en ville	Un policier	Episode: "Accident de moto"
1994	Les grands procès	Roland Dion	Episode: "L'Affaire Dion"
1995	Scoop IV	Latreille	Episode #4.3
1996	Adventures of Smoke Bellew	Big Olaf	6 episodes
1996, 1998	Radio Enfer	Various roles	2 episodes
1997	Cher Olivier	Paul Desmarteaux	4 episodes
1998	The Hunger	Luc	Episode: "Footsteps"
2000	Willie	M. Caron	Episode #1.3
2002	He Shoots, He Scores	Roland Bouchard	6 episodes
2002	The Last Chapter	Moton	6 episodes
2010	Les Rescapés	Itinérant	Episode #1.2
2016	District 31	Gérant aréna	Episode: "Qui a tué Julie Meloche?"
