= Bungalow (2022 film) =

- Directed by: Lawrence Côté-Collins
- Written by: Alexandre Auger; Lawrence Côté-Collins
- Produced by: Luc Vandal; Hany Ouichou
- Starring: Sonia Cordeau; Guillaume Cyr; Ève Landry; Geneviève Schmidt
- Cinematography: Vincent Biron
- Edited by: Jules Saulnier
- Music by: Éric Graveline
- Production company: Coop vidéo de Montréal
- Distributed by: Les Films Opale
- Release date: November 18, 2022 (PÖFF)
- Running time: 102 minutes
- Country: Canada
- Language: French

Bungalow is a Canadian comedy-drama film, directed by Lawrence Côté-Collins and released in 2022. The film stars Sonia Cordeau and Guillaume Cyr as Sarah and Jonathan, a young couple who buy their first house together, but find their relationship strained, as they try to renovate it themselves to save money.

The cast also includes Ève Landry, Geneviève Schmidt, Benoit Mauffette, Martin Larocque, Julie de Lafrenière, Florence Blain Mbaye, Sylvie Léonard, Alain Zouvi, Anaïs Favron, Sasha Migliarese and Alexandre L'Heureux.

The film premiered at the 2022 Tallinn Black Nights Film Festival, before going into commercial release in April 2023.

== Awards ==
Award	Date of ceremony	Category	Recipient(s)	Result	Ref(s)
Prix Iris	December 10, 2023	Best Supporting Actress	Ève Landry	Nominated	
Prix Iris	December 10, 2023	Best Art Direction	Sylvie Desmarais	Nominated	
