= The Other Side of November =

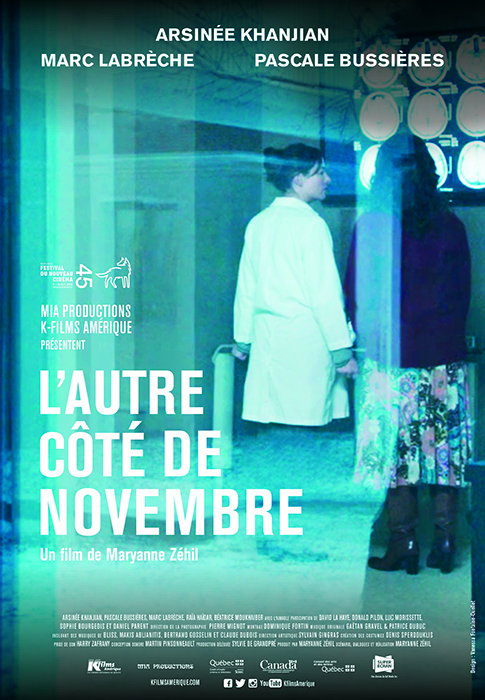
- Poster
- French: L'autre côté de novembre
- Directed by: Maryanne Zéhil
- Written by: Maryanne Zehil
- Produced by: Maryanne Zehil
- Starring: Arsinée Khanjian; Pascale Bussières; Marc Labrèche
- Cinematography: Pierre Mignot
- Edited by: Dominique Fortin
- Music by: Gaëtan Gravel; Patrice Dubuc
- Production company: Mia Productions
- Distributed by: K-Films Amérique
- Release date: 2016
- Running time: 78 minutes
- Country: Canada
- Languages: French; Lebanese

The Other Side of November (French: L'autre côté de novembre) is a 2016 Quebec feature film produced, written and directed by Maryanne Zéhil. The cast includes Arsinée Khanjian, Pascale Bussières, Marc Labrèche, Raïa Haïdar, Béatrice Moukhaiber and an array of Lebanese actors and actresses. The film is a drama dealing with disappearing memory, choices that transform one’s destiny, and how societies shape people by offering them lives that are diametrically opposed to ones they could have lived elsewhere.

== Plot ==
In The Other Side of November, a woman is granted two lives: Léa (played by Arsinée Khanjian), is a bourgeois neurosurgeon living in Quebec, and Layla (also played by Arsinée Khanjian), is a humble seamstress in a small village in Lebanon. These two paths illuminate two different societies and their influence on self-realization. Time and fragmented memories are used playfully to tell the story. The question at the heart of the film is: If someone chose a different path in life years ago, would they still be the same person today?

== Cast ==
- Arsinée Khanjian as Léa/Layla
- Pascale Bussières as Dre Louise
- Marc Labrèche as Dr Bernard/Robert Tremblay
- Raïa Haïdar as Young Layla
- Béatrice Moukhaiber as Samira
- David La Haye as Dr Michel
- Donald Pilon as Dr Serge Labonté
- Wafa’ Tarabay as Om Youssef
- Nada Abou Farhat as Sett Oula
- Walid Al Alaïli as Mayor
- Gretta Aoun as Randa
- Raymonde Saadé Azar as Om Rabih
- Gisèle Boueiz as Najwa
- Andrée Naccouzi as Soha
- Edouard El Hashem as Youssef
- Bshara Attallah as Young Youssef
- Mike Ayvazian as Brahim
- Majdi Machmouchi as Amale's father

== Inspiration ==
Having left Lebanon in 1995 to settle in Quebec, Zehil draws from her own experience to tell this story. She quickly realized that "once you leave your country, settle in another, and integrate completely in order to rebuild your life, there is no way back." She constructs the story from this inevitability by relying on some of her most cherished themes: one’s country of birth, the country that becomes a new home, being human, the place of women in society, and the struggle between what is acquired and what is innate. Zehil uses the loss of memory—whether caused by illness or a deliberate choice—as a foundation, in an attempt to separate free will from that which is predestined, a choice or destiny she says she can no longer escape.

== Festivals ==
- Festival du Nouveau Cinéma
- Sherbrooke World Film Festival
- Outaouais Film Festival
