= Guillaume Lemay-Thivierge =

Canadian actor and film producer (born 1976)

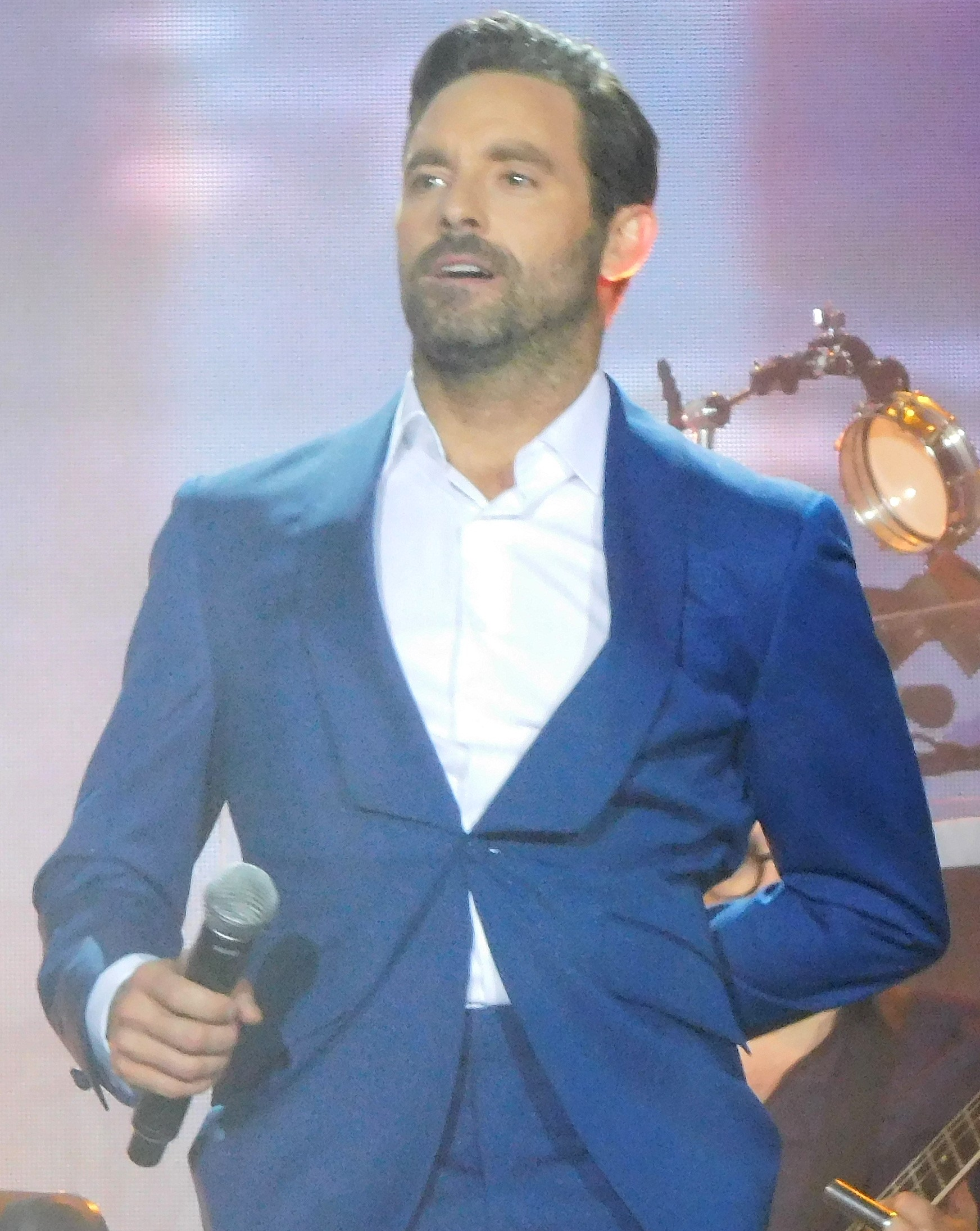
- Born: Guillaume Lemay-Thivierge; February 28, 1976 (age 50); Saint-Jérôme, Quebec, Canada
- Occupation: Actor
- Spouse(s): Mariloup Wolfe (2006–2015); Émily Bégin (2016–present)
- Children: Theodore Lemay-Thivierge (b. 2017); Miro Lemay-Thivierge (b. 2011); Manoé Lemay-Thivierge (b. 2010); Charlie Lemay-Thivierge

Guillaume Lemay-Thivierge (born February 28, 1976) is a Canadian actor and film producer best known for major roles in Quebec films Nitro and The 3 L'il Pigs (Les 3 p'tits cochons) in 2007.

== Profile ==
After participating in a first commercial ad at the age of eight, Thivierge's career started very early at the age of eight when he had his first minor television and film roles on Épopée rock, Manon, The Years of Dreams and Revolt (Les Années de rêves), The Alley Cat (Le Matou) and The Dame in Colour (La Dame en couleurs) in 1984 and 1985.

By the mid-2000s, Lemay-Thivierge had begun taking leading roles in Quebec films, including Nitro and Les 3 p'tits cochons in 2007. Les 3 p'tits cochons was the highest-grossing Quebec film of the year, while Nitro ranked second among Quebec productions. Lemay-Thivierge also played Maxim Marois, a paraplegic lawyer, in the 2006 television series Lance et compte: La revanche.

During his lengthy acting career, Thivierge participated in a total of 30 films and television series including Le Négociateur, Casino, Les Immortels, Chambres en Ville and Ramdam. In addition, in 2004, Thivierge produced the film, Trois petits coups and also starred in theater and musical plays, while he occasionally co-hosted radio shows such as the morning show C't'encore drôle on CKMF-FM in Montreal.

From 2021 to 2023, he was the host of Chanteurs masqués, the Quebec adaptation of the Masked Singer franchise. He lost the show due to a controversial video made when hiking in a wooded trail in which he filmed himself hugging a tree tagged with a racial slur, which he claims not to have seen.

== Personal life ==
Thivierge was in a relationship with Quebec actress Mariloup Wolfe whom he met in 2001. The couple have two children, Manoé and Miro. Thivierge also has a daughter, Charlie, from a previous relationship. Mariloup and Guillaume split up on November 13, 2015. His fourth child, Theodore, was born in 2017 from his current relationship with former Star Académie contestant Emily Begin.

== Filmography ==
=== Television ===
- Epic Rock (Épopée rock) (1984)
- Manon (1985)
- Rooms in town (Chambres en ville) (1989)
- He Shoots, He Scores: Lulu's Crime (Lance et Compte:Le Crime de Lulu) (1991)
- On The Track (Sur la piste) (1995–1997)
- Radio Hell (Radio Enfer) (2000–2001)
- Having Known (Avoir su) (2001)
- Varian's War (2001)
- Rumeurs (2002)
- The Negotiator (Le Négociateur) (2005)
- Trudeau II: Maverick in the Making (2005)
- Feeling (Ramdam) (2001–02, 2006)
- Casino (2006)
- He Shoots, He Scores: Revenge (Lance et Compte: La Revanche) (2006)
- Bye-Bye (2008)
- Taxi 0-22 (2009)
- He Shoots, He Scores: Playoff (Lance et compte: Le grand duel) (2009)
- 30 Vies (2012)
- Trauma (2013)
- Masked Singer (Chanteurs masqués) (2021) - host

=== Films ===
- The Years of Dreams and Revolt (Les Années de rêves) - 1984
- The Alley Cat (Le Matou) - 1985
- The Dame in Colour (La Dame en couleurs) - 1985
- Wild Thing - 1987
- Brother André (Le Frère André) - 1987
- Deaf to the City (Le sourd dans la ville) - 1987
- Florida (La Florida) - 1993
- Louis 19, King of the Airwaves (Louis 19, le roi des ondes) - 1994
- The Immortals (Les Immortels) - 2002
- Three Little Blows (Trois petits coups) - 2004
- Spymate - 2006
- Nitro - 2007
- The 3 L'il Pigs (Les 3 p'tits cochons) - 2007
- The Broken Line (La ligne brisée) - 2008
- Detour (Détour) - 2009
- Free Fall (Les Pieds dans le vide) - 2009
- The Hair of the Beast (Le Poil de la bête) - 2010
- File 13 (Filière 13) - 2010
- Toy Story 3 - 2010: voice of Ken in the French dub
- Thrill of the Hills (Frisson des collines) - 2011
- Nitro Rush - 2016
- The 3 L'il Pigs 2 (Les 3 p'tits cochons 2) - 2016

=== Producer ===
- Trois petits coups (2004)

== Awards and nominations ==
In 2006, Thivierge received a Gemini Award nomination for his role in Casino, while he won an award for BestSupporting Actor role in a Children's Series for his role in Ramdam.
