= Passe-Partout =

Canadian French-language children's television program

- Genre: Children's television series
- Created by: Laurent Lachance
- Written by: Various
- Directed by: Various
- Starring: Marie Eykel; Claire Pimparé; Jacques L'Heureux; Elodie Grenier; Gabrielle Fontaine; Jean-François C. Pronovost
- Theme music composer: Pierre F. Brault; Michèle Poirier
- Composers: Pierre F. Brault; Michel Robidoux
- Country of origin: Canada
- Original language: French
- No. of seasons: 5

Production
- Running time: 30 minutes
- Production companies: JPL Production (1977–1979); Champlain Productions (1983–1984); Attraction Images (2019–2024)

Original release
- Network: Radio-Québec; Radio-Canada; TVOntario
- Release: 14 November 1977 – 16 January 1992
- Release: 25 February 2019 – 16 August 2024

Passe-Partout (French: [pɑːspaʁtu]; lit. '"skeleton key" or "all-purpose"') is a Canadian French-language children's television program funded by the Quebec ministry of education and produced by Radio-Québec (later Télé-Québec) from 1977 to 1992. It was revived in 2019 with a new cast and cancelled once more in August 2024. The show, which also aired on Radio-Canada and TVOntario, had a duration of thirty minutes per episode and included both live actors and puppets, though there was no interaction between the two.

== History ==
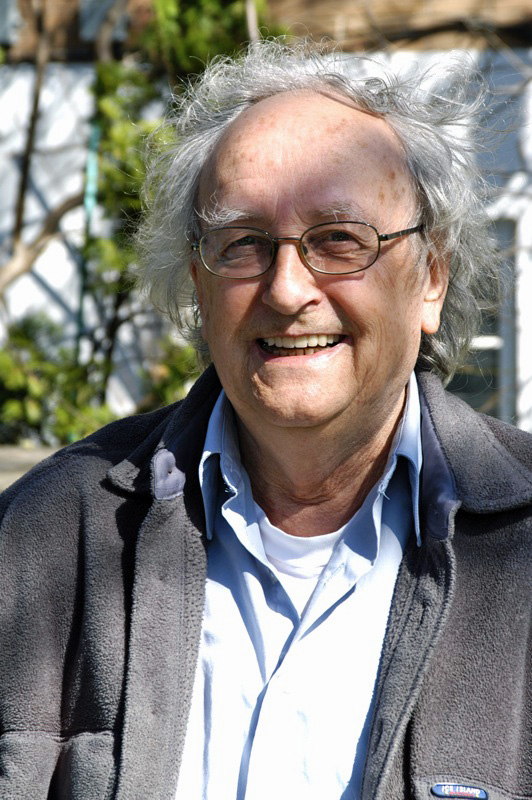
Laurent Lachance, the "father of Passe-Partout"

In 1970, the Quebec ministry of education launched Operation Renouveau, a program that aimed to provide disadvantaged children part-time access to kindergartens. However, due to the high cost of such an endeavour, the idea of creating an educational children's television show instead, based on the recently launched American program Sesame Street, was mooted. The project was launched in 1971, and a year later, Laurent Lachance, later nicknamed the "father of Passe-Partout", took over as producer.

Lachance, working together with Louise Poliquin and Carmen Bourassa, came up with several concepts for the show, which was initially titled Saperlipopette. However, internal conflict between Radio-Québec, which was the designated broadcaster, and the government ministry, led to several delays, and in 1975, Lachance stepped down as producer. The government then turned to private enterprises, and on 14 February 1977, contracted JPL Production, a subsidiary of CFTM-DT, to work on the show. In its original run, 125 episodes were produced until 1979, and these were then rerun on the network. When the public was informed that the show had ended, protests broke out, and a petition with 85,000 signatories was filed in the National Assembly, demanding a sequel. The government ultimately announced a new contract to produce 50 more episodes from 1983 to 1984. Between 1987 and 1988, a third generation of the show was created, and a fourth one ran from 1988 to 1992.

Reruns of Passe-Partout were broadcast on Radio-Canada, Télé-Québec, and TVOntario until 1998. In 2006, a DVD box set of the show was published.

=== Revival ===
Passe-Partout was rebooted in 2019 with a new cast that included Élodie Grenier as Passe-Partout, Gabrielle Fontaine as Passe-Carreau, Jean-François C. Pronovost as Passe-Montagne, Danielle Proulx as Grand-mère, and Widemir Normil as Fardoche. The first episode aired on 25 February, with a viewership of over 700,000. The show ran until 16 August 2024.

== Concept ==
=== Live-action segments ===
Live-action segments usually featured the activities and relationships of several humorous characters: Passe-Partout (French for "skeleton key" or "master key"), a woman dressed mainly in blue (purple in the reboot), who often connected with children on an emotional level; Passe-Carreau (tailoring device to iron seams), a woman dressed mainly in yellow (pink in the reboot), whose focus was on physical activity and fitness; and Passe-Montagne ("balaclava"), a man dressed in brown (red in the reboot) sporting butterfly-shaped bowties, who specialized in vocabulary and verbal exercises.

Other characters who appeared less frequently were André, a happy-go-lucky tinkerer; Julie, who had various jobs, depending on the context of the episode; Fardoche, a farmer; and Grand-mère, a neighbouring older woman who played grandmother to the characters and would narrate stories. Later in the show's run, the characters of Passe-Tourelle, a Haitian immigrant, and Passe-Midi, a Vietnamese man, were added. In 2019, a new character, Tancrède, appeared.

Segments in this category could either be educational (counting, language skills, memory work, etc.), musical (featuring original songs composed in a traditional folk style), moralistic (personal responsibility), or storytelling.

==== Cast and characters ====
1st generation (1977–1979)

- Marie Eykel as Passe-Partout
- Claire Pimparé as Passe-Carreau
- Jacques L'Heureux as Passe-Montagne
- Pierre Dufresne as Fardoche
- Kim Yaroshevskaya as Grand-mère
- André Cartier as André
- Jocelyne Goyette as Julie
- Reine France as Lucille
- Jacques Thériault as Tancrède
- J. Léo Gagnon as Ti-Toine
- Serge Turgeon as the pharmacist

2nd–4th generations (1983–1992)

- Marie Eykel as Passe-Partout
- Claire Pimparé as Passe-Carreau
- Jacques L'Heureux as Passe-Montagne
- Sylvie Gosselin as Tourmaline (2nd and 4th: 1984; 1991–1992)
- Pierre Dufresne as Fardoche (2nd: until 1984)
- Jani Pascal as Bubu (2nd: 1983–1984)
- Linda Sorgini as Lourloupette (3rd: 1987–1988)
- Sylvie Potvin as Chari-Vari (3rd: 1987–1988)
- Daniel Dõ as Passe-Midi (3rd and 4th: 1988–1992)
- Joujou Turenne as Passe-Tourelle (3rd and 4th: 1988–1992)
- Denis Mercier as Tourbillon (4th: 1991–1992)
- Mariline Trahan as Oran (3rd and 4th: 1987–1992)
- Marcelle Hudon as Outan (3rd and 4th: 1987–1992)

5th generation (2019–2024)

- Elodie Grenier as Passe-Partout
- Gabrielle Fontaine as Passe-Carreau
- Jean-François C. Pronovost as Passe-Montagne
- Widemir Normil as Fardoche
- Danielle Proulx as Grand-mère
- Chadi Alhelou as Tancrède

=== Puppet segments ===
The sketches in the puppet segments involved the twins Cannelle and Pruneau and their parents, Perlin and Perline, as well as Grand-papa Bi (their maternal grandfather), Madame Coucou (a single and coquettish neighbour), Rigodon (their same-age male cousin), Ti-Brin (a slightly older boy with a rebellious streak), as well as their classmates: Doualé (a girl from the fictional country of Cantaloupe in the Antilles, who spoke Creole) and Mélodie (Cannelle's friend, a bit of a complainer). A character who never interacted directly with the children was Alakazou, a talking zebra who hosted Cannelle and Pruneau's favourite TV show.

More often than not, the puppet segments dealt with social and moral issues relating to children. In one notable instance, the children's father lost his job and went on extended unemployment benefits, making their future uncertain.

Later in the series, new puppet characters included Minella, who spoke French with an Italian accent, and Jade and Mirio, who were Vietnamese and Haitian, respectively.

In the reboot series, Madame Coucou is a lesbian, Mélodie is Asian, and a new Haitian character, Kiwi, is introduced.

==== Voices ====
1st generation (1977–1979)

- Ève Gagnier as Cannelle
- Mirielle Lachance as Pruneau
- Robert Maltais as Perlin
- Louise Rémy as Perline
- Jean-Claude Robillard as Grand-papa Bi
- Paul Berval as Alakazou
- Marthe Choquette as Madame Coucou
- Élizabeth Chouvalidzé as Rigodon
- Michèle Deslauriers as Ti-Brin, Zig Zag, and Bijou
- Nicole Fontaine as Doualé
- Jocelyne Goyette as Mélodie
- Pierre Dufault as the announcer

2nd–4th generation – additional voices (1983–1992)

- Lucie Beauvais as the second voice of Cannelle (2nd–4th: 1983–1992)
- Jean-Luc Montminy as Tamarin (2nd: 1983–1984)
- Mong Thu Vuong as Jade (3rd: 1987–1988)
- Joujou Turennes as Mirio (3rd: 1987–1988)
- Any Perini as Minella (3rd: 1987–1988)
- Louise Bombardier as Coralie (4th: 1989–1992)
- Lise Thouin as Loriot (4th: 1989–1992)

5th generation (2019–2024)

- Rosemarie Houde as Cannelle
- Julie Beauchemin as Pruneau
- Martin Rouette as Perlin
- Caroline Lavigne as Perline
- Thiéry Dubé as Grand-papa Bi
- Natalie Tannous as Madame Coucou
- Claude Gagnon as Alakazoo
- Marc St-Martin as Zig-Zag
- François-Nicolas Dolan as Virgule
- Sylvie Comtois as Ti-Brin
- Line Boucher as Mélodie
- Anne Lalancette as Kiwi

=== Interlude ===
In between segments, short films were shown. These included animation, art, or children's testimonials. These were often intended to have educational value and showcased daily happenings in children's lives, from going to the dentist, getting X-rays, starting school, playing with friends (or alone), cleaning a bicycle, or simply going to bed.

== Music ==
Theme songs for the first generation of the series (125 episodes) were composed by Pierre F. Brault. The first album of Passe-Partout songs, Passe-partout vol. 1, was released in 1980 and won the 1981 Félix Award for bestselling album; the show's theme song was nominated for the Best Song prize. Several more volumes of songs were published over the ensuing years and won four more Félix Awards.

On 29 September 2009, a compilation album titled Génération Passe-Partout was released, featuring 17 songs from the show performed by contemporary Quebec musicians such as Cœur de pirate, Marie-Élaine Thibert, the Lost Fingers, Martin Deschamps, Lynda Thalie, Florence K, Tricot Machine, Stéphanie Lapointe, Fred Pellerin, and Kaïn. In December, the album was certified Gold for the sale of 40,000 units.

In 2019, an album of cover versions of Brault's music, titled Coucou Passe-Partout and sung by the cast of the rebooted show, was released.

== Legacy ==
Passe-Partout is mentioned in the song "Les étoiles filantes" by the Repentigny-based neo-trad band Les Cowboys Fringants, from their 2004 album, La Grand-Messe; the music video features the original Passe-Partout, Marie Eykel.

In 2007, the Minister of Culture and Communications and Status of Women, Christine St-Pierre, and the MNA for Borduas, Pierre Curzi, passed a motion in the National Assembly of Quebec to pay tribute to Passe-Partout, its actors, and Laurent Lachance, on the occasion of the show's 30th anniversary.

Also in 2007, journalist Steve Proulx published a history of the series, titled L'Operation Passe-Partout.

== Awards and nominations ==
- 1981 Félix Award: Album of the year for Passe-Partout vol. 1 – nominated
- 1981 Félix Award: Bestselling album of the year for Passe-Partout vol. 1 – won
- 1982 Félix Award: Album of the year for Passe-Partout vol. 3 – nominated
- 1982 Félix Award: Bestselling album of the year for Passe-Partout vol. 3 – won
- 1983 Félix Award: Children's album of the year for Passe-Partout vol. 4 – won
- 1986 Félix Award: Children's album of the year for Passe-Partout vol. 6 – Le Noël de Pruneau et de Canelle – won
- 1987 Félix Award: Children's album of the year for Passe-Partout vol. 7 – Comme sur des roulettes – nominated
- 1992 Félix Award: Children's album of the year for Passe-Partout Concerto rigolo – won

== Bibliography ==
- Steve Proulx, L'Opération Passe-Partout, Montréal, Édition Trécarré. 2007 (ISBN 978-2-89568-334-6)
- Michèle B. Tremblay, Dans les coulisses de Passe-Partout: Mémoires d'une script-assistance. 2014 (ISBN 978-2-98084-932-9)
