= The Valley of Tears (film) =

- French: La Vallée des larmes
- Directed by: Maryanne Zéhil
- Written by: Maryanne Zehil
- Produced by: Maryanne Zehil
- Starring: Nathalie Coupal; Joseph Antaki; Nathalie Mallette; Sophie Cadieux; Henri Chassé; Wafa Tarabey; Layla Hakim; Janine Sutto
- Cinematography: Pierre Mignot
- Edited by: Lorraine Dufour
- Music by: Nathalie Coupal
- Production company: Mia Productions
- Distributed by: Les Films Seville
- Release date: 2012
- Running time: 95 minutes
- Country: Canada
- Language: French

The Valley of Tears (French: La Vallée des larmes) is a Quebec film produced, written, and directed by Maryanne Zéhil, starring Nathalie Coupal, Joseph Antaki, Nathalie Mallette, Sophie Cadieux, Henri Chassé, Wafa Tarabey, Layla Hakim, and Janine Sutto. It is Zehil's second full-length feature film.

== Plot ==
The film recounts the 1982 massacres in the Palestinian refugee camps of Sabra and Shatila, Lebanon. Marie, a Montreal publisher, receives a written testimony from a man named Ali, who experienced the events firsthand. Marie is unaware that Joseph, a Lebanese employee of the publishing house, is the real author of the testimony. One day, Joseph goes missing.

== Cast ==
- Nathalie Coupal as Marie Simard
- Joseph Antaki as Joseph/Ali
- Nathalie Mallette as Josée Simard
- Janine Sutto as Simone Simard
- Sophie Cadieux as Isabelle
- Henri Chassé as Gilles
- Wafa Tarabey as Oum Omar
- Layla Hakim as Sister Gabrielle
- Walid El Alayli as Issa
- Yara Farès as Girl
- Julien Farhat as Tony
- Robert Issa as Miled
- Ziad Karam as Ali

== Inspiration ==
Setting her story amidst the unpunished genocide of the 1982 massacres, Zehil raises the question of the responsibility of mothers in sending their sons to their deaths. Her film suggests that if Arab and Israeli mothers were held partly accountable, they might stop passing their thirst for revenge on to their children. To evoke the horrors of this setting, Zehil drew heavily on her experience working as a journalist in her native country of Lebanon.

== Festivals ==
- Bengaluru International Film Festival, India 2012 (World Cinema)
- Chennai International Film Festival, India 2012 (World Cinema)
- Dubaï International Film Festival, United Arab Emirates 2012 (Arabian Nights)
- World premiere at Shanghai International Film Festival, China 2012
- Cairo International Film Festival, Egypt 2012 (Human Rights)
- Best Fiction Award at the 3rd Greenpoint Film Festival, New York 2013
- Presented at the Beirut International Film Festival, Lebanon 2013 (Panorama section)
- Cleveland International Film Festival, USA 2013
- Fajr International Film Festival, Iran 2014
