= Free Fall (2009 film) =

Canadian drama film

- French: Les Pieds dans le vide
- Directed by: Mariloup Wolfe
- Written by: Vincent Bolduc
- Produced by: Claude Veillet
- Starring: Guillaume Lemay-Thivierge; Éric Bruneau; Laurence Leboeuf
- Cinematography: Jérôme Sabourin
- Edited by: Yvann Thibaudeau
- Music by: Michel Corriveau
- Production company: Les Films Vision 4
- Distributed by: TVA Films
- Release date: 14 August 2009
- Running time: 105 minutes
- Country: Canada
- Language: French

Free Fall (French: Les Pieds dans le vide) is a 2009 Canadian drama film, directed by Mariloup Wolfe. The film centres on a love triangle between Charles (Guillaume Lemay-Thivierge), the owner of a parachuting adventure company, Rafaël (Éric Bruneau), a daredevil who takes dangerous risks because of his frustration at having been rejected for his dream job as an airline pilot due to partial deafness in one ear, and Manu (Laurence Leboeuf), the woman who is torn between both men while simultaneously coping with her mother's diagnosis with terminal cancer, over a summer as they prepare for an annual BASE jump off a Montreal skyscraper.

A secondary subplot also focuses on Ludovic (Adam Kosh), a newer acquaintance of the trio who is struggling to come to terms with his homosexuality. The cast also includes Monique Spaziani, Andrew Shaver, Vincent Bolduc and Martin Dubreuil.

Brendan Kelly of the Montreal Gazette reviewed the film unfavourably, writing that "All of the lead actors can do much better than this, but clearly there's no room in this film to do anything other than play to the cheap seats. This is particularly galling in the case of Leboeuf, who's shown in things like Les Lavigueur, la vraie histoire that she's actually a real talent and not just another pretty face." Denise Martel of Le Journal de Québec was more positive, calling the film an agreeable surprise and writing that Wolfe showed promise as a director.
