= Widemir Normil =

Haitian Canadian actor (born 1963)

Widemir Normil (born February 5, 1963) is a Haitian Canadian actor based in Québec, best known for his roles as Fardoche in the 21st-century revival of the children's television series Passe-Partout, and Captain Raymond Célestin in Escouade 99, the Quebec adaptation of Brooklyn Nine-Nine.

Born in Port-au-Prince, he moved to Canada with his family in childhood and grew up in Saint-Jean-sur-Richelieu. While a student at McGill University, he competed in a modeling contest, winning first place, and was a model for a number of years before turning his hand to stand-up comedy and acting. He had a small part in the 1989 film Cruising Bar, before becoming more widely known with regular roles in the television series Le Grand Remous and Chambres en ville from 1989 to 1991.

He also has regular dubbing roles, including as the French voice of Idris Elba in Marvel films and Terry Crews in The Expendables series.

== Filmography ==
=== Film ===
Year	Title	Role	Notes
1989	Cruising Bar	Western doorman	
1991	Deserter	Akossi-Woyo Barthélémy	
1994	Desire in Motion (Mouvements du désir)	Attendant	
1995	Black List (Liste noire)	Medical examiner	
1995	La Passion de l'innocence		
1998	When I Will Be Gone (L'Âge de braise)	Mangala/Roger	
2001	Karmen Geï	Superintendent	
2004	The Last Tunnel (Le Dernier tunnel)	Robert Jolicoeur	
2004	How to Conquer America in One Night (Comment conquérir l'Amérique en une nuit)		
2008	Honey, I'm in Love (Le Grand Départ)	Father Joe	
2009	File 13 (Filière 13)	Chief Baptiste Eustache	
2011	Saint-Belmont	Milkman	
2015	Death Dive (Le Scaphandrier)	Fr. François St-Juste	
2015	Rabid Dogs (Enragés)	Policeman	
2018	The Fall of Sparta (La Chute de Sparte)	Virgil's father	

=== Television ===
Year	Title	Role	Notes
1989–91	Le Grand remous	Joseph Maboulaï	Series regular
1989–91	Chambres en ville	Georges Magloire	Series regular
1989	The Paper Wedding (Les noces de papier)	Taxi driver	
1991	Marilyn	Jérémie Brown	
1992	Scoop	Policeman	
1992–94	La Montagne du Hollandais	Virgile Kibongo	
1993	Scoop II	Vernod Avril	
1995	Scoop IV	Vernod Avril	
1996	Jasmine	Joseph Isidora	
1998	Windsor Protocol	French African delegate	
1998	Réseaux	Coco	
1998–1999	À la poursuite de Carmen Sandiego	Engine Crew Member	Series regular
1999–2000	2 frères	François Yvon	Nine episodes
1999–2001	Tohu-Bohu	Simoun the Genie	31 episodes
2001–03	Mon meilleur ennemi	Jude Mokolo	
2006	Les Bougon	STUM Boss	One episode
2006	Lance et compte: La revanche	Marcellin Maltais	Three episodes
2006–07	Ramdam	Dieudonné Dessalines	Two episodes
2007–12	Kaboum	Uhuru	
2009–10	The Dating Guy	Woody Jenkins	French version only; character voiced by Sean Francis in English
2012	30 vies	François Miles	One episode
2016	The Clan (Le Clan)	Sgt. Leclerc	One episode
2016–17	L'Imposteur	Rachid Cherry	Eight episodes
2018	District 31	Antoine Maurais	Eight episodes
2019	Passe-Partout	Fardoche	
2019–22	Une autre histoire	André Boissonneault	16 episodes
2020–22	Escouade 99	Raymond Célestin	
2021	Gazebo		
2023	Sorcières		
