= Laurent Lachance =

French Canadian teacher and author (1931–2024)

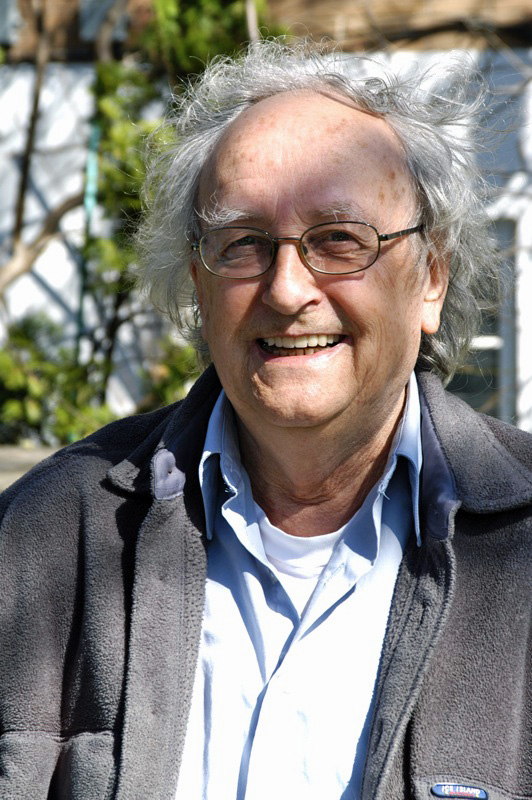
- Lachance in 2010
- Born: 16 March 1931; Montreal, Quebec, Canada
- Died: 4 October 2024 (aged 93)
- Education: Université de Montréal
- Occupations: Linguist; author
- Known for: Passe-Partout

Laurent Lachance (16 March 1931 – 4 October 2024) was a French Canadian author and schoolteacher.

== Biography ==
Early life

Born in Montreal on 16 March 1931, Lachance studied at the Université de Montréal. He began his career as a French and Latin teacher at the Collège Sainte-Croix, the Collège St-Paul, and the Collège de Bois-de-Boulogne. He directed educational projects at the Ministry of Education and Higher Education of Quebec from 1968 to 1986 and at Télé-Québec from 1986 to 1993.

Passe-Partout

Between 1972 and 1975, Lachance helped create the popular children's television program Passe-Partout. On 14 November 2007, the National Assembly of Quebec marked the 30th anniversary of the creation of Passe-Partout. That year, Lachance announced his intention to file a lawsuit against the distributor of the show's DVDs in order to obtain his own right to make profits. However, the court ruled against him, stating that he was not the owner of the series' copyright. The legal saga continued into 2012, when a superior court dismissed the case on merits, though Lachance had the option to appeal to the Supreme Court of Canada.

Other work

In addition to Passe-Partout, Lachance also directed programs by Canal Famille. In 2019, he released Quenotte and Quenoeil, coloring books published online.

Death

Lachance died on 4 October 2024, at the age of 93.

== Works ==
Children's stories

- Le Trou perdu, Héritage (1983)

Stories for adults

- Ailleurs plutôt que demain (1991)
- Le Tigre-sabre (1993)

Dream interpretations

- Les rêves de mentent pas (1983)
- Rêves, signes et coïncidences : Dictionnaire d'interprétation (1999)
- Les rêves portent conseil : Guide d'interprétation (2000)
- Interprétez les rêves de votre enfant (2001)

Biographies

- Fernand Caron et l'âme du bois
- André Turpin peintre et sculpteur, propos et confidences (2016)

History

- De Sainte-Croix à Maisonneuve, 75 ans d'histoire (2003)
