= Telefiction =

Canadian television and film production company

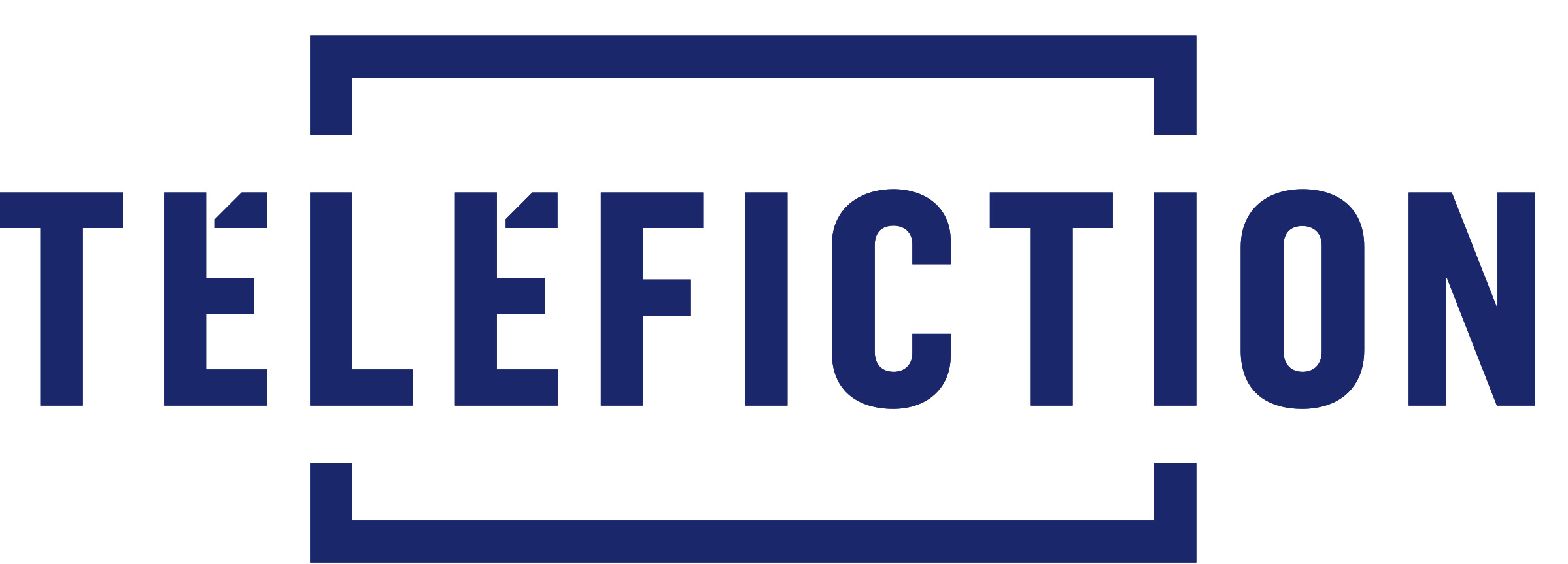
Telefiction logo

Telefiction (French: Téléfiction) is a Canadian television and film production company based in Montreal. Its film division, Les Films Vision 4, has produced such works as Matusalem (1993), The Pig's Law (2001), The Mysterious Miss C. (2002), Duo (2006) Free Fall (2009), Aurelie Laflamme's Diary (2010), and Jouliks (2019).

== Selected filmography ==
=== Telefiction ===
- Pin-Pon (1996–1998)
- Toc toc toc (2007–2015)

=== Les Films Vision 4 ===
- Matusalem (1993)
- The Pig's Law (2001)
- The Mysterious Miss C. (2002)
- Duo (2006)
- Free Fall (2009)
- Aurelie Laflamme's Diary (2010)
- Jouliks (2019)
