= Pin-Pon (TV series) =

French Canadian children's television series

- Genre: Children's; Educational
- Written by: Paule Marier; Carmen Bourassa
- Directed by: Pierre Lord
- Starring: Yves Soutière; Thomas Graton; Philippe Lambert
- Country of origin: Canada
- Original language: French
- No. of seasons: 3
- No. of episodes: 195

Production
- Running time: 26 minutes
- Production company: Telefiction

Original release
- Network: Canal Famille
- Release: September 2, 1996 – 1998

Pin-Pon is a French Canadian children's educational television series that aired on Canal Famille from 1996 to 1998. It starred Yves Soutière and Thomas Graton as Pin-Pin and Pon-Pon, two firefighters who lead children in various songs, stories, and games in their fire station. The supporting cast included Philippe Lambert as Pin-Pin's brother Pouet-Pouet.

The series ended production in 1998 but aired in reruns until 2001 and was subsequently also rebroadcast on Télé-Québec.

In 2022, Soutière and Graton reunited to create a TikTok video in character as Pin-Pin and Pon-Pon, to promote the book Génération Canal Famille, a history of the channel.

== Film ==
A film expansion, Pin-Pon, le film, was directed by Ghyslaine Côté and released in 1999. It centred on Pin-Pin, Pon-Pon, and Pouet-Pouet taking a road trip in a red Volkswagen Beetle to a campground and meeting various characters along the way. Its cast included Julien Poulin as Uncle Mimile, Stéphane Vallières as Filipo, Mireille Lévesque as Filipa, Melven Gilbert as Filipetto, and Anastassia Fomina as Filipetta.

The film received two Jutra Award nominations in 2000, for Best Art Direction (Michel Marsolais, Hélène Schneider) and Best Editing (José Heppell).
