= Théâtre Maisonneuve =

Theatre in Montreal, Canada

Coordinates: 45.508823°N 73.56544°W

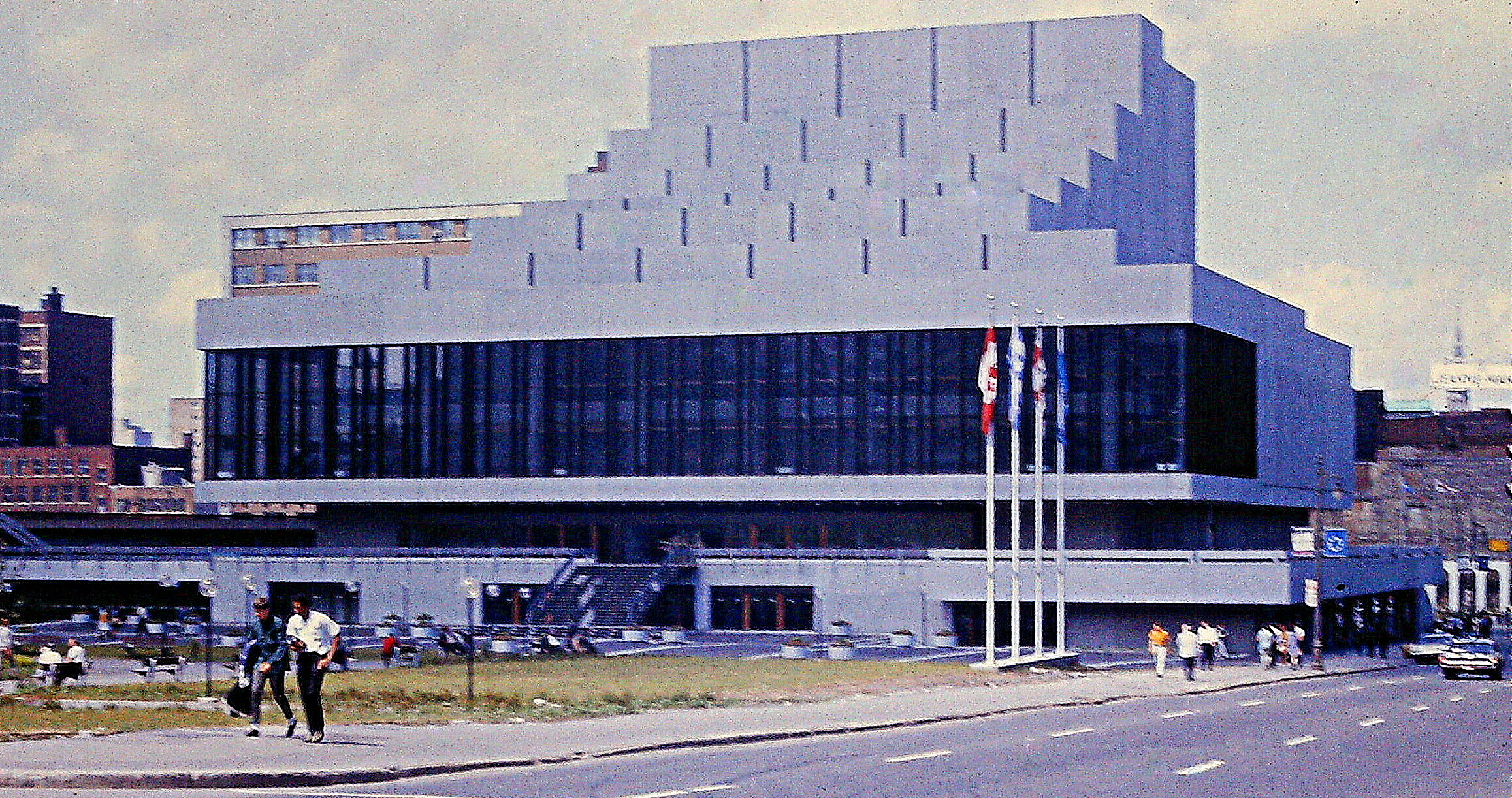
- Exterior of venue (c.1968)
- Interactive map of Théâtre Maisonneuve
- Location: 260, boulevard de Maisonneuve Ouest; Montreal, Quebec, Canada; H2X 1Y9
- Operator: Place des Arts
- Capacity: 1,453

Construction
- Opened: 1967
- Architects: David & Boulva

Tenants
- Les Grands Ballets Canadiens; Orchestre Métropolitain; I Musici de Montréal; Collège Sainte Anne de Lachine

Théâtre Maisonneuve is a theatre in Montreal, Quebec, Canada. It is located at Place des Arts in the Quartier des spectacles neighbourhood in the borough of Ville-Marie.

Théâtre Maisonneuve was inaugurated in 1967 and was named for the founder of Montreal, Paul Chomedey de Maisonneuve.

The theatre has 1,453 seats and is used for variety shows, benefits small ensembles and soloists, musicals and films. Regularly, it also presents the benefits of Les Grands Ballets Canadiens, the Orchestre Métropolitain, I Musici de Montreal and the Pro Musica Society. Quebec Issime presents his show every year.
