= Unité 9 =

Canadian TV drama series

- Genre: Drama, Téléroman
- Created by: Danielle Trottier
- Directed by: Jean-Philippe Duval (Seasons 1-7); Louis Bolduc (Season 1); Yan Turgeon (Season 4)
- Creative director: Frédéric Joire
- Starring: Guylaine Tremblay; Ève Landry; François Papineau; Céline Bonnier; Luc Guérin; Debbie Lynch-White
- Theme music composer: Michel Cusson (Mélodika)
- Country of origin: Canada
- Original language: French
- No. of seasons: 7
- No. of episodes: 169

Production
- Producers: Fabienne Larouche; Michel Trudeau; Sébastien Pigeon; Sylvie Lacoste; Aetios Productions
- Editor: Myriam Poirier
- Running time: 44 minutes

Original release
- Release: September 11, 2012 – March 26, 2019

Unité 9 (or, in English, “Unit 9”) is a Québec television series broadcast from 2012 through 2019 on Radio Canada, the CBC French-language service. Created by dramatist Danielle Trottier, the show has since 2013 been syndicated on France's TV5Monde network. The 169-show series has been one of the most-watched shows in Québec, with ratings of up to two million viewers for the 44-minute episodes.

== Synopsis ==
Marie Lamontagne, a mother of two, having been convicted for attempted murder, lives in Unit 9 of Lietteville, a federal penitentiary for women. As she adjusts to her new life in prison, with the help of other inmates, she learns about their relationships and why each of them was incarcerated, as well as the histories of the prison employees. In this new environment, Marie confronts Normand Despins, the prison director, who has a different conception concerning the rehabilitation of prisoners, and tries to show that everyone has the right to a second chance.

The fictional Lietteville is based on a real women's prison located in Joliette, Québec.

== Series development ==
Danielle Trottier had the idea of making a series on the environment of a women's prison after reading Justice Louise Arbour's 1996 report of the Commission of Inquiry into Certain Events at the Prison for Women in Kingston, Trottier's study of that report was the initial motivation for her concern over the plight of imprisoned women: "I cried and was angry after reading this report," she recalls. "I knew right away that I had found a good vein, and I haven't stopped reading about it since." She then spent five years in researching, which included visits to the Joliette women's prison. There she met several prisoners, whom she characterized as “intelligent, sensitive, extremely generous people, in the process of change.”

Series development began in earnest in 2008 with the TVA network's filming of two pilot episodes. By March 2010 the network had declined to commission more episodes, stating that they preferred targeting a more family-oriented audience. "I came with people who led rather turbulent lives. This wasn't the type of story they were looking for, and they had a perfect right to do so," Trottoir told Le Soleil. A year and a half later, she and screenwriter-producer Fabienne Larouche jointly turned to Radio-Canada to support the production, and gained the go-ahead from that network in January 2012.
