= Prix Gémeaux =

Canadian French television and digital media award

Prix Gemeaux
- Awarded for: Outstanding achievements in French-language Canadian television
- Country: Canada
- Presented by: Academy of Canadian Cinema and Television
- Website: https://academie.ca/prixgemeaux

Television/radio coverage
- Network: Ici Radio-Canada Télé

The Prix Gémeaux (French pronunciation: [pʁi ʒe.mo]) or Gémeaux Awards honour achievements in Canadian television and digital media that is broadcast in French. It has been sponsored by the Academy of Canadian Cinema and Television since 1987. Introduced as a French-language equivalent to the Gemini Awards, the Canadian Academy's former presentation for English-language television, it remains separate from the contemporary Canadian Screen Awards despite being presented by the same parent organization.

== History ==
In 1986, ACTRA transferred their awards to the Academy of Canadian Cinema & Television. The Academy called their television awards the Gemini Awards, or Prix Gémeaux in French. After their first Gemini awards ceremony for English-language television, the academy decided to have an awards ceremony for French-language television in 1987. In 2003 the Academy added categories for digital media.

The first webcast for the awards ceremony was in 2008.

In 2013, the Academy decided to keep the Prix Gémeaux separate from the merged Canadian Screen Awards. The Academy decided on this separation because French-language television does not have strong viewership in English Canada and there is a strong recognition of French-speaking celebrities among Quebecois people.

In 2015, many categories were separated or renamed in response to production studios boycotting previous ceremonies. The Academy eliminated Best Soap Opera and replaced Best Drama Series with Best Annual Drama Series for shows that have between 2 and 13 episodes, Best Seasonal Drama Series for 14 to 26 episodes, and Best Daily Drama Show. In 2018 a change in rules dictated that if there is only one show nominated in a category, that show can instead be entered into the category that is closest to its runtime. This rule allowed District 31 to apply for entry in the Best Seasonal Drama Series.

== Nomination process ==
Before 2015, production companies and producers would submit shows and individuals to be considered for a nomination. The Academy then created a nomination jury of five or six people who were selected because they had expertise and experience in that category. After viewing all entries, the jury would meet to choose by consensus two to five people to be nominated. The nominees would be announced in June. After a rules change in 2015, the juries for each category were replaced with six juries whose membership was decided by broadcasters.

== Awards process ==
Before 2015, the process of awarding Prix Gémeaux consisted of a weighted vote; 50% of the weighted vote was from the nomination jury while 50% was weighted from members of the Academy. Each voter would rank the nominees from best to worst. After 2015, the weighted vote was recalculated and the nomination juries were 70% of the weighted total while 20% was decided by Academy members. The remaining 10% was based on the show's ratings and each program was ranked by Numeris.

== Awards ==
For awards of merit, there are 84 television categories and 15 digital media categories. The Academy also awards Special Awards for various achievements. The Academy appoints a special committee who suggests nominations but they have also sent calls for nominations from Academy members. A proposed nominee is then presented to the Quebec board of the Academy for approval. The special awards include "le Gémeau spécial des artisans" (Note: In English, "The Special Gémeaux for Craftsmen") created in 2019 and "le prix spécial de la relève" (Note: In English, "The Special Prize for the Next Generation") is awarded to someone at the beginning of their career who is under 35 years old.

In 2022, the Prix Gémeaux announced that they would move to presenting ungendered categories for Best Performance, in lieu of separate categories for actors and actresses. This followed a similar announcement by the Canadian Screen Awards earlier in 2022.

== Ceremonies ==
Edition	Date	Host(s)	Venue	Broadcaster
1st	February 15, 1987	Janette Bertrand	Salle Claude-Champagne	Télévision de Radio-Canada
2nd	February 7, 1988	Denise Filiatrault and Dominique Michel	Maison de Radio-Canada	Télévision de Radio-Canada
3rd	December 18, 1988	Normand Brathwaite	Théâtre Maisonneuve	Télévision de Radio-Canada
4th	December 10, 1989	Marcel Leboeuf	Aréna Maurice-Richard	Télévision de Radio-Canada
5th	December 16, 1990	Louise Marleau and Yves Jacques	Théâtre Maisonneuve	Télévision de Radio-Canada
6th	December 15, 1991	Normand Brathwaite	Palais des congrès de Montréal	Télévision de Radio-Canada
7th	December 13, 1992	Normand Brathwaite	Palais des congrès de Montréal	Télévision de Radio-Canada
8th	September 26, 1993	Normand Brathwaite	Théâtre Maisonneuve	Télévision de Radio-Canada
9th	October 2, 1994	Normand Brathwaite	Théâtre Maisonneuve	Télévision de Radio-Canada
10th	October 1, 1995	Normand Brathwaite	Centre Pierre-Charbonneau	Télévision de Radio-Canada
11th	September 29, 1996	Normand Brathwaite	Théâtre Saint-Denis	Télévision de Radio-Canada
12th	October 5, 1997	Normand Brathwaite	Théâtre Saint-Denis	Télévision de Radio-Canada
13th	September 27, 1998	Normand Brathwaite	Théâtre Saint-Denis	Télévision de Radio-Canada
14th	September 26, 1999	Normand Brathwaite	Théâtre Saint-Denis	Télévision de Radio-Canada
15th	October 15, 2000	Normand Brathwaite	Théâtre Saint-Denis	Télévision de Radio-Canada
16th	September 30, 2001	Normand Brathwaite	Théâtre Saint-Denis	Télévision de Radio-Canada
17th	September 29, 2002	Normand Brathwaite	Théâtre Saint-Denis	Télévision de Radio-Canada
18th	November 23, 2003	no host	Théâtre Saint-Denis	Télévision de Radio-Canada
19th	November 28, 2004	no host	Théâtre Saint-Denis	Télévision de Radio-Canada
20th	December 4, 2005	Patrick Masbourian, Patricia Paquin and Sophie Prégent	Théâtre Saint-Denis	Canal D
21st	December 9, 2006	Serge Postigo	Palais des congrès de Montréal	ARTV
22nd	September 9, 2007	André Robitaille	Palais des congrès de Montréal	Télévision de Radio-Canada
23rd	September 14, 2008	Véronique Cloutier	Théâtre Maisonneuve	Télévision de Radio-Canada
24th	September 20, 2009	Véronique Cloutier	Théâtre Maisonneuve	Télévision de Radio-Canada
25th	September 19, 2010	Véronique Cloutier	Théâtre Maisonneuve	Télévision de Radio-Canada
26th	September 18, 2011	Véronique Cloutier	Théâtre Maisonneuve	Télévision de Radio-Canada
27th	September 16, 2012	Joël Legendre	Théâtre Maisonneuve	Télévision de Radio-Canada
28th	September 15, 2013	René Simard	Théâtre Maisonneuve	ICI Radio-Canada Télé
29th	September 14, 2014	René Simard	Théâtre Maisonneuve	ICI Radio-Canada Télé
30th	September 20, 2015	Véronique Cloutier and Éric Salvail	Théâtre Maisonneuve	ICI Radio-Canada Télé
31st	September 18, 2016	Éric Salvail and Jean-Philippe Wauthier	Théâtre Saint-Denis	ICI Radio-Canada Télé
32nd	September 17, 2017	Éric Salvail and Jean-Philippe Wauthier	Théâtre Maisonneuve	ICI Radio-Canada Télé
33rd	September 16, 2018	Jean-Philippe Wauthier	Théâtre Maisonneuve	ICI Radio-Canada Télé
34th	September 15, 2019	Véronique Cloutier	Théâtre Saint-Denis	ICI Radio-Canada Télé
35th	September 20, 2020	Véronique Cloutier	Maison de Radio-Canada	ICI Radio-Canada Télé
36th	September 19, 2021	Véronique Cloutier	Maison de Radio-Canada	ICI Radio-Canada Télé
37th	September 18, 2022	Véronique Cloutier	Théâtre Maisonneuve	ICI Radio-Canada Télé
38th	September 17, 2023	Pierre-Yves Lord	Théâtre Maisonneuve	ICI Radio-Canada Télé
39th	September 15, 2024	Pierre-Yves Lord	Théâtre Maisonneuve	ICI Radio-Canada Télé
40th	September 14, 2025	Véronique Cloutier	Salle Wilfrid-Pelletier	ICI Radio-Canada Télé
