= Prix collégial du cinéma québécois =

The Prix collégial du cinéma québécois (College Prize for Quebec Cinema) is an annual Canadian film award, presented to a film from Quebec judged as the best of the year by a jury of students in film studies programs at the province's CEGEPs. The award is presented in conjunction with Québec Cinéma, and headed by filmmaker Micheline Lanctôt.

The award was presented for the first time in 2012, honouring films released in 2011.

The initial slate of shortlisted nominees for the award is selected by a provincewide committee and announced in January, following which the participating schools integrate the films into their programs so that students can view, discuss and debate them. During the Rendez-vous Québec Cinéma festival in February, events are also organized with each of the nominated directors, allowing participating students to meet the filmmakers and ask questions about the films. Finally, in late March the award conference is organized, in which students from across the province gather to engage in the final discussions and deliberations to select the award winner.

From its inauguration until 2023, the organization presented only a single award each year for feature films, except in 2021 when in addition to the regular award for that year's films, the organization marked its tenth anniversary by presenting a special Film of the Decade award to one of the ten films that had won the annual award up to that point. The Film of the Decade award was won by Xavier Dolan's Laurence Anyways.

In 2023, an award for short films was introduced.

== Feature films ==
=== 2010s ===
Year	Film	Director	Ref
2012
2012	Familiar Grounds (En terrains connus)	Stéphane Lafleur	
2012	Monsieur Lazhar	Philippe Falardeau	
2012	Nuit #1	Anne Émond	
2012	The Salesman (Le Vendeur)	Sébastien Pilote	
2012	Wetlands (Marécages)	Guy Édoin	
2013
2013	Laurence Anyways	Xavier Dolan	
2013	Camion	Rafaël Ouellet	
2013	Over My Dead Body	Brigitte Poupart	
2013	Romeo Eleven (Roméo Onze)	Ivan Grbovic	
2013	War Witch (Rebelle)	Kim Nguyen	
2014
2014	Vic and Flo Saw a Bear (Vic+Flo ont vu un ours)	Denis Côté	
2014	Diego Star	Frédérick Pelletier	
2014	The Dismantling (Le Démantèlement)	Sébastien Pilote	
2014	Gabrielle	Louise Archambault	
2014	The Meteor (Le Météore)	François Delisle	
2015
2015	You're Sleeping Nicole (Tu dors Nicole)	Stéphane Lafleur	
2015	3 Indian Tales (3 histoires d'Indiens)	Robert Morin	
2015	Miraculum	Daniel "Podz" Grou	
2015	Mommy	Xavier Dolan	
2015	Tom at the Farm (Tom à la ferme)	Xavier Dolan	
2016
2016	Chorus	François Delisle	
2016	The Amina Profile (Le profil Amina)	Sophie Deraspe	
2016	Corbo	Mathieu Denis	
2016	Felix and Meira (Félix et Meira)	Maxime Giroux	
2016	My Internship in Canada (Guibord s'en va-t-en guerre)	Philippe Falardeau	
2017
2017	Manor (Manoir)	Martin Fournier, Pier-Luc Latulippe	
2017	Bad Seeds (Les mauvaises herbes)	Louis Bélanger	
2017	Before the Streets (Avant les rues)	Chloé Leriche	
2017	It's Only the End of the World (Juste la fin du monde)	Xavier Dolan	
2017	Prank	Vincent Biron	
2018
2018	Infiltration (Le problème d’infiltration)	Robert Morin	
2018	Ravenous (Les Affamés)	Robin Aubert	
2018	Resurrecting Hassan (La résurrection d’Hassan)	Carlo Guillermo Proto	
2018	Still Night, Still Light (Mes nuits feront écho)	Sophie Goyette	
2018	Tadoussac	Martin Laroche	
2019
2019	Happy Face	Alexandre Franchi	
2019	Fake Tattoos (Les faux tatouages)	Pascal Plante	
2019	Family First (Chien de garde)	Sophie Dupuis	
2019	Manic	Kalina Bertin	
2019	Winter Claire (Claire l'hiver)	Sophie Bédard Marcotte	

=== 2020s ===
Year	Film	Director	Ref
2020
2020	Antigone	Sophie Deraspe	
2020	A Brother's Love (La femme de mon frère)	Monia Chokri	
2020	Kuessipan	Myriam Verreault	
2020	Matthias and Maxime (Matthias et Maxime)	Xavier Dolan	
2020	Sympathy for the Devil (Sympathie pour le diable)	Guillaume de Fontenay	
2021
2021	Call Me Human (Je m'appelle humain)	Kim O'Bomsawin	
2021	The Decline (Jusqu'au déclin)	Patrice Laliberté	
2021	Mafia Inc.	Daniel "Podz" Grou	
2021	Nadia, Butterfly	Pascal Plante	
2021	The Rose Family (Les Rose)	Félix Rose	
2022
2022	Underground (Souterrain)	Sophie Dupuis	
2022	Beans	Tracey Deer	
2022	Drunken Birds (Les oiseaux ivres)	Ivan Grbovic	
2022	Goddess of the Fireflies (La déesse des mouches à feu)	Anaïs Barbeau-Lavalette	
2022	Prayer for a Lost Mitten (Prière pour une mitaine perdue)	Jean-François Lesage	
2023
2023	Viking	Stéphane Lafleur	
2023	Babysitter	Monia Chokri	
2023	Falcon Lake	Charlotte Le Bon	
2023	Family Game (Arsenault et fils)	Rafaël Ouellet	
2023	That Kind of Summer (Un été comme ça)	Denis Côté	
2024
2024	Red Rooms (Les chambres rouges)	Pascal Plante	
2024	Gamma Rays (Les rayons Gamma)	Henry Bernadet	
2024	Geographies of Solitude	Jacquelyn Mills	
2024	Humanist Vampire Seeking Consenting Suicidal Person (Vampire humaniste cherche suicidaire consentant)	Ariane Louis-Seize	
2024	The Nature of Love (Simple comme Sylvain)	Monia Chokri	
2025
2025	Atikamekw Suns (Soleils Atikamekw)	Chloé Leriche	
2025	Hurricane Boy Fuck You Tabarnak! (L'Ouragan F.Y.T.)	Ara Ball	
2025	Simon and Marianne (Simon et Marianne)	Pier-Luc Latulippe, Martin Fournier	
2025	When Adam Changes (Adam change lentement)	Joël Vaudreuil	
2025	Wild Feast (Festin boréal)	Robert Morin	
2026
2026	Phoenixes (Phénix)	Jonathan Beaulieu-Cyr	
2026	Peak Everything (Amour Apocalypse)	Anne Émond	
2026	These Wild Cats (Des chats sauvages)	Steve Patry	
2026	Universal Language (Une langue universelle)	Matthew Rankin	
2026	Vile & Miserable (Vil et Misérable)	Jean-François Leblanc	

== Short films ==
Year	Film	Director	Ref
2023
2023	Oasis	Justine Martin	
2023	À la vie à l'amor	Émilie Mannering	
2023	The Left Hand (La main gauche)	Maxime Robin	
2023	Simo	Aziz Zoromba	
2023	The Lauzon Theory (La théorie Lauzon)	Marie-Josée Saint-Pierre	
2024
2024	Madeleine	Raquel Sancinetti	
2024	Cherry	Laurence Gagné-Frégeau	
2024	Kings (Les Rois)	Olivier Côté	
2024	UWD	Brigitte Poupart	
2024	Until You Die (Jusqu’à ce que tu meures)	Florence Lafond	
2025
2025	A Crab in the Pool (Un trou dans la poitrine)	Jean-Sébastien Hamel, Alexandra Myotte	
2025	Extras	Marc-Antoine Lemire	
2025	Hello Stranger	Amélie Hardy	
2025	Himalia	Clara Milo, Juliette Lossky	
2025	Rituals Under a Scarlet Sky (Rituels sous un ciel écarlate)	Dominique Chila, Samer Najari	
2026
2026	My Memory-Walls (Mes murs-mémoires)	Axel Robin	
2026	Pidikwe (Rumble)	Caroline Monnet	
2026	Platanero	Juan Frank Hernandez	
2026	The Punk of Natashquan (Le Punk de Natashquan)	Nicolas Lachapelle	
2026	What We Leave Behind (Ce qu’on laisse derrière)	Alexandra Myotte, Jean-Sébastien Hamel	
