= 20th Quebec Cinema Awards =

2018 Canadian film awards ceremony

The 20th Quebec Cinema Awards ceremony was held on 3 June 2018 in Montreal, to recognize talent and achievement in the Cinema of Quebec. It was hosted by actresses Édith Cochrane and Guylaine Tremblay, who also jointly hosted the 2017 Prix Iris. Formerly known as the Jutra Awards, the Prix Iris name was announced in October 2016. A new category, Best Sound for a Documentary Film, was created for the 2018 event, and the nominees for Best Film was increased from five to seven.

The first winner was announced in spring 2018, with director and screenwriter André Forcier honoured with the Iris Hommage for 50 years of contributions to the province's film industry. Artisans-category awards were given on 29 May.

Hochelaga, Land of Souls (Hochelaga, terre des âmes) lead the ceremony with ten nominations and received the most awards with five, including Best Supporting Actor for Emmanuel Schwartz. Despite this, it broke the record for the film with the most nominations without receiving a Best Film nomination. Infiltration (Le problème d'infiltration) also received ten nominations and won Best Actor for Christian Bégin.

Robin Aubert's Ravenous (Les affamés) dominated the ceremony. With nine nominations, it swept each of the eight categories it was nominated in; only Micheline Lanctôt lost the award for Best Supporting Actress against her co-star Brigitte Poupart. It became the third film to win Best Film without a Best Screenplay nomination. Aubert also directed another Best Film nominee, Tuktuq, which received three nominations.

Cross My Heart (Les rois mongols) and Family First (Chien de garde) each received eight nominations, with the former winning two awards, including Best Screenplay, while the latter won three awards, including two acting awards, and was the first to win both Best Actress for Maude Guérin and Revelation of the Year for Théodore Pellerin.

== Winners and nominees ==
Winners and nominees are:

Best Film	Best Director
Ravenous (Les affamés) — Stéphanie Morissette; Boost — Frederic Bohbot, Kieran Crilly, Darren Curtis; Cross My Heart (Les rois mongols) — Luc Châtelain, Stéphanie Pages; Infiltration (Le problème d'infiltration) — Luc Vandal; The Little Girl Who Was Too Fond of Matches (La petite fille qui aimait trop les allumettes) — Marcel Giroux; Tuktuq — Robin Aubert; Family First (Chien de garde) — Étienne Hansez	Robin Aubert, Ravenous (Les affamés); Darren Curtis, Boost; Sophie Dupuis, Family First (Chien de garde); Robert Morin, Infiltration (Le problème d'infiltration); Luc Picard, Cross My Heart (Les rois mongols)
Best Actor	Best Actress
Christian Bégin, Infiltration (Le problème d'infiltration); Jesse Camacho, We're Still Together; Patrick Huard, Bon Cop, Bad Cop 2; Joey Klein, We're Still Together; Jean-Simon Leduc, Family First (Chien de garde)	Maude Guérin, Family First (Chien de garde); Charlotte Aubin, Isla Blanca; Mélissa Désormeaux-Poulin, Threesome (Le trip à trois); Denise Filiatrault, It's the Heart That Dies Last (C'est le cœur qui meurt en dernier); Élise Guilbault, A Place to Live (Pour vivre ici)
Best Supporting Actor	Best Supporting Actress
Emmanuel Schwartz, Hochelaga, Land of Souls (Hochelaga, terre des âmes); Jahmil French, Boost; Robert Morin, Tuktuq; Guy Thauvette, Infiltration (Le problème d'infiltration); Anthony Therrien, Slut in a Good Way (Charlotte a du fun)	Brigitte Poupart, Ravenous (Les affamés); Isabelle Blais, Tadoussac; Sandra Dumaresq, Infiltration (Le problème d'infiltration); Micheline Lanctôt, Ravenous (Les affamés); Karine Vanasse, Worst Case, We Get Married (Et au pire, on se mariera)
Best Screenplay	Best Cinematography
Nicole Bélanger, Cross My Heart (Les rois mongols); Darren Curtis, Boost; Sophie Dupuis, Family First (Chien de garde); Robert Morin, Infiltration (Le problème d'infiltration); Gabriel Sabourin, It's the Heart That Dies Last (C'est le cœur qui meurt en dernier)	Nicolas Bolduc, Hochelaga, Land of Souls (Hochelaga, terre des âmes); Steve Asselin, Barefoot at Dawn (Pieds nus dans l'aube); Nicolas Canniccioni, The Little Girl Who Was Too Fond of Matches (La petite fille qui aimait trop les allumettes); François Dutil, Cross My Heart (Les rois mongols); Michel La Veaux, Iqaluit
Best Art Direction	Best Sound
Francois Séguin, Hochelaga, Land of Souls (Hochelaga, terre des âmes); André-Line Beauparlant, Infiltration (Le problème d'infiltration); Guillaume Couture, Cross My Heart (Les rois mongols); Jean-Marc Renaud, We Are the Others (Nous sommes les autres); Marjorie Rhéaume, The Little Girl Who Was Too Fond of Matches (La petite fille qui aimait trop les allumettes)	Jean-Sébastien Beaudoin Gagnon, Stéphane Bergeron, Olivier Calvert, Ravenous (Les affamés); Jean-Sébastien Beaudoin Gagnon, Sylvain Bellemare, Hans Laitres, All You Can Eat Buddha; Claude Beaugrand, Bernard Gariépy Strobl, Claude La Haye, Raymond Legault, Jean-Philippe Savard, Hochelaga, Land of Souls (Hochelaga, terre des âmes); Martin C. Desmarais, Gavin Fernandes, Marie-Claude Gagné, Louis Gignac, Bon Cop, Bad Cop 2; Clovis Gouaillier, Philippe Lavigne, Patrice LeBlanc, The Little Girl Who Was Too Fond of Matches (La petite fille qui aimait trop les allumettes)
Best Editing	Best Original Music
Dominique Fortin, Family First (Chien de garde); Robin Aubert, Tuktuq; Jared Curtis, Boost; Aube Foglia, The Little Girl Who Was Too Fond of Matches (La petite fille qui aimait trop les allumettes); Felipe Guerrero, X Quinientos	Pierre-Philippe Côté, Ravenous (Les affamés); Bertrand Chenier, Infiltration (Le problème d'infiltration); Patrice Dubuc, Gaëtan Gravel, Vincent Banville, Gregory Beaudin Kerr, Jonathan Quirion, Jean-Francois Ruel, Pierre Savu-Massé, Charles-André Vincelette (Dead Obies), Family First (Chien de garde); Gyan Riley, Terry Riley, Hochelaga, Land of Souls (Hochelaga, terre des âmes); Michael Silver, Boost
Best Costume Design	Best Makeup
Mario Davignon, Hochelaga, Land of Souls (Hochelaga, terre des âmes); Julie Bécotte, We Are the Others (Nous sommes les autres); Josée Castonguay, Barefoot at Dawn (Pieds nus dans l'aube); Francesca Chamberland, The Little Girl Who Was Too Fond of Matches (La petite fille qui aimait trop les allumettes); Brigitte Desroches, Cross My Heart (Les rois mongols)	Erik Gosselin, Marie-France Guy, Ravenous (Les affamés); Kathryn Casault, Hochelaga, Land of Souls (Hochelaga, terre des âmes); Kathryn Casault, Stéphane Tessier, Infiltration (Le problème d'infiltration); Bruno Gatien, All You Can Eat Buddha; Marlène Rouleau, We Are the Others (Nous sommes les autres)
Best Hairstyling	Best Visual Effects
Réjean Forget, Ann-Louise Landry, Hochelaga, Land of Souls (Hochelaga, terre des âmes); Anne-Marie Lanza, We Are the Others (Nous sommes les autres); Jean-Luc Lapierre, Denis Parent, Cross My Heart (Les rois mongols); Denis Parent, The Little Girl Who Was Too Fond of Matches (La petite fille qui aimait trop les allumettes); Lina Fernanda Cadavis, Priscila De Villalobos, Aleli Mesina, Pamela Warden, X Quinientos	Jean-François Ferland, Ravenous (Les affamés); Jean-François Ferland and Marie-Claude Lafontaine, Barefoot at Dawn (Pieds nus dans l'aube); Jean-François Ferland, Olivier Péloquin and Simon Harrisson, Infiltration (Le problème d'infiltration); Alain Lachance, Hochelaga, Land of Souls (Hochelaga, terre des âmes); Jonathan Piché Delorme and Alexandra Vaillancourt, We Are the Others (Nous sommes les autres)
Revelation of the Year	Best Casting
Théodore Pellerin, Family First (Chien de garde); Romane Denis, Slut in a Good Way (Charlotte a du fun); Marine Johnson, The Little Girl Who Was Too Fond of Matches (La petite fille qui aimait trop les allumettes); Rose-Marie Perreault, Fake Tattoos (Les faux tatouages); Nabil Rajo, Boost	Emanuelle Beaugrand-Champagne, Nathalie Boutrie and Frédérique Proulx, Cross My Heart (Les rois mongols); Maxime Giroux and Jonathan Oliveira, Boost; Lucie Robitaille, Slut in a Good Way (Charlotte a du fun)
Best Documentary	Best Cinematography in a Documentary
Resurrecting Hassan (La résurrection d'Hassan) – Carlo Guillermo Proto; Manic – Kalina Bertin, Marina Serrao; Destierros – Hubert Caron-Guay; The Devil's Share (La part du diable) – Luc Bourdon, Colette Loumède; A Moon of Nickel and Ice (Sur la lune de nickel) – François Jacob, Christine Falco, Vuk Stojanovic	François Messier-Rheault, A Skin So Soft (Ta peau si lisse); Benoit Aquin and Mathieu Roy, The Dispossessed (Les dépossédés); Samuel de Chavigny, Far Away Lands (Les terres lointaines); François Jacob, Vuk Stojanovic, Ilya Zima, A Moon of Nickel and Ice (Sur la lune de nickel); Étienne Roussy, Destierros
Best Editing in a Documentary	Best Sound in a Documentary
Anouk Deschênes, Manic; Sophie Farkas Bolla, P.S. Jerusalem; Michel Giroux, The Devil's Share (La part du diable); Lorenzo Mora Salazar and Carlo Guillermo Proto, Resurrecting Hassan (La résurrection d'Hassan); Ariane Pétel-Despots, Destierros	Catherine Van Der Donckt, Jean Paul Vialard, The Devil's Share (La part du diable); Daniel Almada, Patrick Becker, Julien Fréchette, Reto Stamm, Christof Steinmann, The Dispossessed (Les dépossédés); Sylvain Bellemare, Bernard Gariépy Strobl, Félix Lamarche, Far Away Lands (Les terres lointaines); Samuel Gagnon-Thibodeau, Alexis Pilon-Gladu, Destierros; Carlo Guillermo Proto, Cory Rizos, Pablo Villegas, Resurrecting Hassan (La résurrection d'Hassan)
Best Live Action Short Film	Best Animated Short Film
Pre-Drink – Marc-Antoine Lemire, Maria Gracia Turgeon; Born in the Maelstrom – Meryam Joobeur, Hany Ouichou, Sylvain Corbeil; The Catch – Holly Brace-Lavoie, Fanny Drew, Sarah Mannering; Crème de menthe – Jean-Marc E. Roy, Philippe David Gagné; Lost Paradise Lost – Yan Giroux, Annick Blanc	Dolls Don't Cry (Toutes les poupées ne pleurent pas) – Frédérick Tremblay, Pierre Lesage; Hedgehog's Home (La maison du hérisson) – Eva Cvijanović, Jelena Popović, Vanja Andrijević; Me, Baby & the Alligator – Jean Faucher, Bob Olivier; Sweet Childhood (La pureté de l'enfance) – Julie Roy, Marc Bertrand, Ron Dyens; With or Without Sun (Avec ou sans soleil) – Jean-Guillaume Bastien
Most Successful Film Outside Quebec	Public Prize
Ravenous (Les affamés) — Robin Aubert; All You Can Eat Buddha — Ian Lagarde; Ballerina — Éric Summer, Éric Warin; Hochelaga, Land of Souls (Hochelaga, terre des âmes) — François Girard; X Quinientos — Juan Andrés Arango	Major Junior (Junior Majeur); Ballerina; Bon Cop, Bad Cop 2; Father and Guns 2 (De père en flic 2); Threesome (Le trip à trois)

== Multiple wins and nominations ==
=== Films with multiple nominations ===
Nominations	Film
10	Hochelaga, Land of Souls (Hochelaga, terre des âmes)
10	Infiltration (Le problème d'infiltration)
9	Ravenous (Les affamés)
8	Cross My Heart (Les rois mongols)
8	Family First (Chien de garde)
8	The Little Girl Who Was Too Fond of Matches (La petite fille qui aimait trop les allumettes)
7	Boost
5	We Are the Others (Nous sommes les autres)
4	Destierros
3	All You Can Eat Buddha
3	Barefoot at Dawn (Pieds nus dans l'aubre)
3	Bon Cop, Bad Cop 2
3	The Devil's Share (La part du diable)
3	Resurrecting Hassan (La résurrection d'Hassan)
3	Slut in a Good Way (Charlotte a du fun)
3	Tuktuq
3	X Quinientos
2	Ballerina
2	The Dispossessed (Les dépossédés)
2	Far Away Lands (Les terres lointaines)
2	It's the Heart That Dies Last (C'est le cœur qui meurt en dernier)
2	Manic
2	A Moon of Nickel and Ice (Sur la lune de nickel)
2	Threesome (Le trip à trois)
2	We're Still Together

=== Films with multiple wins ===
Wins	Film
8	Ravenous (Les affamés)
5	Hochelaga, Land of Souls (Hochelaga, terre des âmes)
3	Family First (Chien de garde)
2	Cross My Heart (Les rois mongrols)
