= Steve Asselin =

Canadian cinematographer and multiple award nominee

Steve Asselin is a Canadian cinematographer, most noted as a six-time Jutra Award and Prix Iris nominee for Best Cinematography.

== Filmography ==
=== Film ===
- Second Chance - 1999
- Écarté - 2000
- Requiem contre un plafond - 2001
- A Girl at the Window (Une jeune fille à la fenêtre) - 2001
- Québec-Montréal - 2002
- Clearing Skies (Une éclaircie sur le fleuve) - 2003
- Vendus - 2004
- Looking for Alexander (Mémoires affectives) - 2004
- Saint Martyrs of the Damned (Saints-Martyrs-des-Damnés) - 2005
- Elisabeth Heywood, le conte de Noël - 2005
- Transparence - 2006
- Deliver Me (Délivrez-moi) - 2006
- The Rip Off - 2006
- Happiness Bound - 2007
- Borderline - 2008
- Dans une galaxie près de chez vous 2 - 2008
- A No-Hit No-Run Summer (Un été sans point ni coup sûr) - 2008
- 1981 - 2009
- Romaine par moins 30 - 2009
- The Year I Became a Liar - 2009
- L'Épitaphe - 2010
- Crying Out (À l'origine d'un cri) - 2010
- The Hair of the Beast (Le poil de la bête) - 2010
- La dernière rondelle - 2010
- Trotteur - 2011
- The Happiness of Others (Le Bonheur des autres) - 2011
- Comptine en 2 temps - 2012
- Another House (L'Autre maison) - 2013
- Bunker - 2014
- 1987 - 2014
- Corbo - 2014
- Remembering Maria Chapdelaine - 2015
- Paul à Québec - 2015
- Barefoot at Dawn (Pieds nus dans l'aube) - 2017
- Ovoïde - 2017
- 1991 - 2019
- Compulsive Liar (Menteur) - 2019
- Flashwood - 2020
- Slaxx - 2020
- The Time Thief (L'Arracheuse de temps) - 2021
- The Dishwasher (Le Plongeur) - 2023
- My Mother's Men (Les Hommes de ma mère) - 2023
- L'Autre - 2026
- Haunted (Hantée) - 2026

=== Television ===
- Les Rescapés - 2011-12
- Apparences - 2012
- Mon meilleur ami - 2013
- La Malédiction de Jonathan Plourde - 2018
- The Wall (La Faille) - 2021
- Larry - 2022

== Awards ==
Award	Year	Category	Work	Result	Ref(s)
Jutra/Iris Awards	2006	Best Cinematography	Saint Martyrs of the Damned (Saints-Martyrs-des-Damnés)	Nominated	
Jutra/Iris Awards	2014	Best Cinematography	Another House (L'Autre maison)	Nominated	
Jutra/Iris Awards	2016	Best Cinematography	Corbo	Nominated	
Jutra/Iris Awards	2018	Best Cinematography	Barefoot at Dawn (Pieds nus dans l'aube)	Nominated	
Jutra/Iris Awards	2019	Best Cinematography	1991	Nominated	
Jutra/Iris Awards	2022	Best Cinematography	The Time Thief (L'Arracheuse de temps)	Nominated	
Gémeaux Awards	2012	Best Cinematography in a Drama Series	Les Rescapés	Nominated	
Gémeaux Awards	2012	Best Cinematography in a Drama Series	Apparences	Won	
Gémeaux Awards	2013	Best Cinematography in a Drama Series	Mon meilleur ami	Nominated	
Gémeaux Awards	2019	Best Cinematography in a Drama Series	La Malédiction de Jonathan Plourde	Nominated	
CFC Worldwide Short Film Festival	2003	Best Cinematography	Clearing Skies (Une éclaircie sur le fleuve)	Won	
