= The Little Girl Who Was Too Fond of Matches (film) =

- Theatrical poster
- French: La petite fille qui aimait trop les allumettes
- Directed by: Simon Lavoie
- Screenplay by: Simon Lavoie
- Based on: The Little Girl Who Was Too Fond of Matches by Gaétan Soucy
- Produced by: Marcel Giroux
- Starring: Marine Johnson; Antoine L'Écuyer; Jean-François Casabonne; Alex Godbout; Laurie Babin
- Cinematography: Nicolas Canniccioni
- Edited by: Aube Foglia
- Production company: GPA Films
- Distributed by: Les Films Séville
- Release dates: September 11, 2017 (TIFF); November 3, 2017 (Quebec)
- Running time: 111 minutes
- Country: Canada
- Language: French

The Little Girl Who Was Too Fond of Matches (French: La petite fille qui aimait trop les allumettes) is a 2017 Canadian drama film directed by Simon Lavoie and starring Marine Johnson, Antoine L'Écuyer and Jean-François Casabonne. Lavoie also wrote the screenplay. An adaptation of Gaétan Soucy's novel of the same name, the film centres on Alice Soissons (Marine Johnson), a girl raised to believe she is a boy, who lives in with her father and brother in oppressive and secluded conditions. When her father dies, she ventures into the village, where outsiders tell her she is female, and she fears the family home is now under threat.

The adaptation was filmed in Montreal, Quebec and the Laurentides and shot in black and white. It premiered at the Toronto International Film Festival. It was nominated for seven Canadian Screen Awards, including Best Motion Picture.

== Plot ==
In rural 1930s Quebec, Alice (Marine Johnson) lives in house with older brother, known only as Frère (Antoine L'Écuyer), and their father Mr. Soissons (Jean-François Casabonne), a recluse who is feared and hated in the village. Armed with rifles, Soissons and Frère forbid anyone from entering their property. Soissons has raised Alice as a boy, cutting her hair short and breast binding her, and tells her she is a boy whose penis fell off when she was small. Soissons also tells his children he created them out of clay. As Alice has doubts as to these stories, Frère finds her outside of the house reading a book, the memoirs of the Duc de Saint-Simon, that Soissons has banned. Frère rapes her. Later, Alice finds Soissons in the shed, where he is feeding pieces of food to a mysterious person in chains; Soissons describes this as a "just punishment," the figure being known as Juste (Laurie Babin). At night, Mr. Soissons enters his children's bedroom and inspects Alice, discovering she is pregnant. He begins beating Frère, whom he realizes has impregnated her, though neither of his children understand this.

Soissons commits suicide by hanging; Frère and Alice discover the nude body. They decide the body must be buried, but Alice declares they need a coffin and takes Mr. Soissons' horse to the village, where she has never been before. As she rides the horse, she feels sexually stimulated, until she comes across a church in congregation. Drawn in by the music, she leads her horse into the building, where the attendees and priest react with shock and anger. They drag her out, and force her to reveal that Mr. Soissons is dead, and that he had two "sons", one of whom is her. When she bites the priest's hand, he angrily orders her taken away. Several men take her to a barn and tie her to a pole. One of the churchgoers, a young man named Paul-Marie (Alex Godbout), then enters and unties her, tells her she is female, and notices she is pregnant. Paul-Marie tells her the villagers will come to the house since they know Mr. Soissons is dead, and that Alice will likely be confined to an orphanage or convent.

Alice returns to the house to warn Frère that the villagers will come, believing they are evil, and finds Frère trying to dismember their father's body to bury it. Frère picks up a rifle and declares himself the new master of the domain; Alice tells him to feel her belly, as she has experienced quickening. She then goes to the shed, where she frees Juste, a scarred and mute woman. Alice tells Juste she has learned where life comes from. Paul-Marie arrives to warn Alice and Frère that the priest, coroner, pathologist and armed police are marching to the property. Frère chases Paul-Marie off the land with his rifle, but Alice climbs onto Paul-Marie's motorcycle as they attempt to escape. Frère fires his weapon, killing Paul-Marie and causing the motorcycle to crash.

The villagers capture and restrain Frère while Alice stands over Juste with an ax. Alice gathers her belongings and goes back into the house, where she finds a charred corpse she refers to as Mama. As Alice's water breaks, she flashes back to a little girl playing with a sparkler as a girl, in the presence of her mother. When the sparkler runs out, the first girl's young sister picked up matches and lit one, accidentally igniting the dress of the first girl. The mother attempted to save the girl, but also caught fire. The father rushed in and attempted to put out the fire on his daughter, leaving his wife to burn. In the present, Alice lights matches again and proceeds to burn the house down. In labour, she wanders into the forest, where she gives birth and clutches her child.

== Cast ==
- Marine Johnson as the young girl
- Antoine L'Écuyer as the brother
- Jean-François Casabonne as the father
- Alex Godbout as Paul-Marie
- Laurie Babin as the just punishment

== Production ==
=== Development ===
Soucy's novel The Little Girl Who Was Too Fond of Matches was published in 1998 and later had an international publication in 20 languages before the adaptation. While many producers considered the novel a poor choice for basing a film on, producer Marcel Giroux asked director Simon Lavoie if he would be interested in such a project in 2013; Lavoie claimed to be a fan of the novel and accepted the offer. On 26 April 2016, Telefilm Canada announced $17 million in grants for 17 projects, including the adaptation to be directed by Lavoie, based on his screenplay.

Lavoie said he met with Soucy to discuss ideas before Soucy died in 2013. Lavoie described the story as a poetic drama about life before the Quiet Revolution, a time of sexual repression and numerous religious and social issues. In his adaptation, much of the dialogue was rewritten, with Lavoie explaining "What stayed with me about the novel 15 years later wasn't the book's language ... That's often the first thing people bring up about this particular novel — it’s very particular, very baroque language. What had actually stayed with me were the characters and the particular poetry of the situation."

=== Filming ===
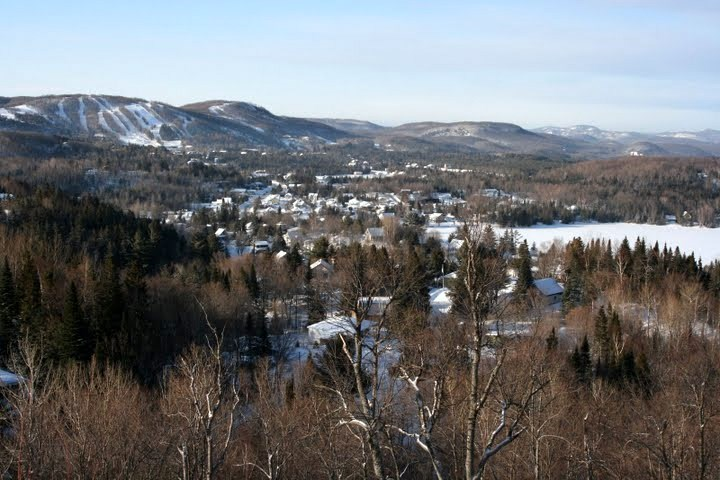
Filming took place in Saint-Faustin, Quebec.

Principal photography commenced on 4 September 2016. The story is set in agricultural areas of Quebec in the 1930s. To depict this setting, filming took place in Montreal and Saint-Faustin, Quebec in the Laurentides.

Cinematographer Nicolas Canniccioni and Lavoie and chose to shoot in black and white, with Canniccioni employing a Red Epic Monochrome 6K camera. Art director Marjorie Rhéaume also selected colours in designing the sets that would reflect well in this photography.

== Release ==
The film's world premiere took place at the Toronto International Film Festival in September 2017. It was screened at the TIFF Bell Lightbox, rather than in the same larger Winter Garden theatre as Lavoie's previous film Those Who Make Revolution Halfway Only Dig Their Own Graves, which won Best Canadian Film.

A release in Quebec theatres was then scheduled for 3 November, and the first trailer was publicized in August 2017, revealing the black and white photography and hinting at intense themes. It opened in Montréal, Trois-Rivières, Pont-Viau, Longueuil and Boucherville on 3 November. Seville International sold international distribution rights, with Gravitas Ventures buying for the United States. Gravitas Ventures prepared a Blu-ray for a Region A release on 20 March 2018.

== Reception ==
=== Critical reception ===
Norman Wilner, writing for Now, assessed the film as "a gripping story", citing Johnson as "riveting ... At times animalistic, at times tender and ethereal, she's whatever the role requires". Odile Tremblay wrote in Le Devoir that the adaptation would appeal to fans of the novel, and the deceased Soucy would have accepted the interpretation. For The Canadian Press, David Friend called it "viscerally unsettling". The Hollywood Reporter's Boyd van Hoeij declared "this is art house fare that's challenging but also rewarding". Marc-André Lussier awarded it three and a half stars in La Presse, positively reviewing the style. Le Devoir critic François Lévesque described it as oddly beautiful.

In December, TIFF named the film to its annual Canada's Top Ten list of the ten best Canadian films. In March for The Martlet, John Ledingham declared it "not a film for the faint of heart" but in which some viewers may find "something sublime in a suffering timeless and universal". On Rotten Tomatoes, the film has an approval rating of 83% based on six reviews.

=== Accolades ===
At TIFF, the film received an honorable mention for the Award for Best Canadian Film. At the 6th Canadian Screen Awards, it received seven nominations, among the five films to receive the most nominations with eight or seven each. While diversity was a theme of the ceremony, it was noted as among the Quebec films that lost in major categories.

Award	Date of ceremony	Category	Recipient(s)	Result	Ref(s)
Canadian Screen Awards	11 March 2018	Best Motion Picture	Marcel Giroux	Nominated	
Canadian Screen Awards	11 March 2018	Best Adapted Screenplay	Simon Lavoie	Nominated	
Canadian Screen Awards	11 March 2018	Best Actor	Antoine L'Écuyer	Nominated	
Canadian Screen Awards	11 March 2018	Best Actress	Marine Johnson	Nominated	
Canadian Screen Awards	11 March 2018	Best Cinematography	Nicolas Canniccioni	Nominated	
Canadian Screen Awards	11 March 2018	Best Art Direction / Production Design	Marjorie Rhéaume	Nominated	
Canadian Screen Awards	11 March 2018	Best Visual Effects	Marc Hall, Jonathan Cyr, Emmanuel Bazin, Clément Natiez, Emmanuelle Gill	Nominated	
Prix Iris	3 June 2018	Best Film	Marcel Giroux	Nominated	
Prix Iris	3 June 2018	Revelation of the Year	Marine Johnson	Nominated	
Prix Iris	3 June 2018	Best Cinematography	Nicolas Canniccioni	Nominated	
Prix Iris	3 June 2018	Best Editing	Aube Foglia	Nominated	
Prix Iris	3 June 2018	Best Art Direction	Marjorie Rhéaume	Nominated	
Prix Iris	3 June 2018	Best Costume Design	Francesca Chamberland	Nominated	
Prix Iris	3 June 2018	Best Visual Effects	Marc Hall, Jonathan Cyr, Emmanuel Bazin, Clément Natiez, Emmanuelle Gill	Nominated	
Prix Iris	3 June 2018	Best Sound	Clovis Gouaillier, Philippe Lavigne, Patrice LeBlanc	Nominated	
Prix Iris	3 June 2018	Best Hair	Denis Parent	Nominated	
Toronto International Film Festival	7 – 17 September 2017	Best Canadian Film Honorable Mention	Simon Lavoie	Won	
