= Marcel Giroux =

Canadian film producer

- Occupations: Film producer Television producer

Marcel Giroux is a Canadian film producer. He co-founded the company GPA Films in Montreal with André Pelletier in 1983, using it to make documentary films, advertisements, music videos and other productions.

In 1989, after Pelletier died, Giroux shifted the company's focus to feature films and television. In 1997, he was nominated for the Genie Award for Best Live-Action Short Film for Zie 37 Stage.

While many producers considered the novel The Little Girl Who Was Too Fond of Matches by Gaétan Soucy a poor choice for basing a film on, Giroux purchased the rights. He asked director Simon Lavoie if he would be interested in such a project in 2013; Lavoie claimed to be a fan of the novel and accepted the offer. On 26 April 2016, Telefilm Canada announced financial support for Giroux's production. For The Little Girl Who Was Too Fond of Matches, Giroux was nominated for the Canadian Screen Award for Best Motion Picture.

== Filmography ==
His films include:

- Black List (1995)
- Where Atilla Passes (2015)
- The Little Girl Who Was Too Fond of Matches (2017)
- No Trace (Nulle trace) (2021)
