= You'll Never Know (film) =

2023 Canadian drama film

- French: Tu ne sauras jamais
- Directed by: Robin Aubert
- Written by: Robin Aubert; Julie Roy
- Produced by: Étienne Hansez
- Starring: Martin Naud
- Cinematography: Steeve Desrosiers
- Edited by: Robin Aubert
- Production company: Bravo Charlie
- Distributed by: Axia Films
- Release date: November 10, 2023 (Cinemania)
- Running time: 110 minutes
- Country: Canada
- Language: French

You'll Never Know (French: Tu ne sauras jamais) is a Canadian drama film, directed by Robin Aubert and released in 2023. The film stars Martin Naud as Paul Vincent, an elderly man confined to his room in a nursing home during the COVID-19 pandemic who is determined to do everything in his power to see the woman he loves, who is similarly confined in her own room, once more before he dies.

The film was the first-ever acting role for Naud, an 88-year-old retired fire investigator from Repentigny, Quebec. Aubert and Julie Roy had originally written the screenplay with actor Jean Lapointe in mind for the role, but after he was unable to work on the film due to his declining health and death in 2022, they instead chose to cast a non-professional actor, and Naud auditioned for the role after his daughter Guylaine told him that she had heard about a casting call.

The film's cast also includes Sarah Keita, Jean-Marie Lapointe, Marie-Hélène Brousseau, Louise Gougeon and Guillaume Baillargeon.

The film premiered in November 2023 at the Cinemania film festival, before opening commercially in March 2024.
