= Over My Dead Body (2012 Canadian film) =

- Film poster
- Directed by: Brigitte Poupart
- Written by: Brigitte Poupart
- Produced by: Virginie Dubois; Stéphanie Morissette; Brigitte Poupart
- Starring: Dave St-Pierre
- Cinematography: Brigitte Poupart
- Edited by: Alexis Landriault
- Music by: Misteur Valaire; Marie-Jo Thério
- Production company: Coop Vidéo de Montréal
- Distributed by: Les Films du 3 mars
- Release date: February 26, 2012 (RVQC)
- Running time: 80 minutes
- Country: Canada
- Language: French

Over My Dead Body is a Canadian documentary film, directed by Brigitte Poupart and released in 2012. The film is a portrait of Dave St-Pierre, a dancer and choreographer from Montreal who is urgently awaiting a lung transplant due to his lifelong battle with cystic fibrosis.

The film premiered in February 2012 at the Rendez-vous Québec Cinéma.

The film was a Canadian Screen Award nominee for Best Feature Length Documentary at the 1st Canadian Screen Awards, and won the Prix Jutra for Best Documentary Film at the 15th Jutra Awards. It was a nominee for the Prix collégial du cinéma québécois in 2013.

== Release ==
Over My Dead Body was released on DVD on October 23, 2012.
