= Tadoussac (film) =

2017 film

- Directed by: Martin Laroche
- Written by: Martin Laroche
- Produced by: Martin Laroche
- Starring: Camille Mongeau; Isabelle Blais; Juliette Gosselin
- Cinematography: Ariel Méthot-Bellemare
- Edited by: Amélie Labrèche
- Production companies: Les Films de L'Autre; Productions Sisyphe
- Distributed by: K Films Amérique
- Release date: September 22, 2017 (Dieppe)
- Running time: 90 minutes
- Country: Canada
- Language: French

Tadoussac is a Canadian drama film, directed by Martin Laroche and released in 2017. The film stars Camille Mongeau as Chloé, an unhappy young woman from Montreal who abandons her urban life and travels to the small town of Tadoussac, where she befriends Myriam (Isabelle Blais), a local tour guide who is battling emotional demons of her own. The cast also includes Isabelle Boivin, Serge Boulianne and Juliette Gosselin.

The film was shot in 2016, in Tadoussac and other areas in the Côte-Nord region of Quebec.

The film premiered in September 2017 at the Festival du film canadien de Dieppe, where it won the Jury Prize and the Espoir du cinéma. It had its Canadian premiere at the Festival du cinéma international en Abitibi-Témiscamingue in October.

Mongeau won the Bayard Award for Best Actress at the Festival International du Film Francophone de Namur, while Blais won the Golden Goblet Award for Best Actress at the 2018 Shanghai International Film Festival and received a Prix Iris nomination for Best Supporting Actress at the 20th Quebec Cinema Awards. The film was shortlisted for the Prix collégial du cinéma québécois in 2018.
