= Sophie Faucher =

Canadian actress (1958–2026)

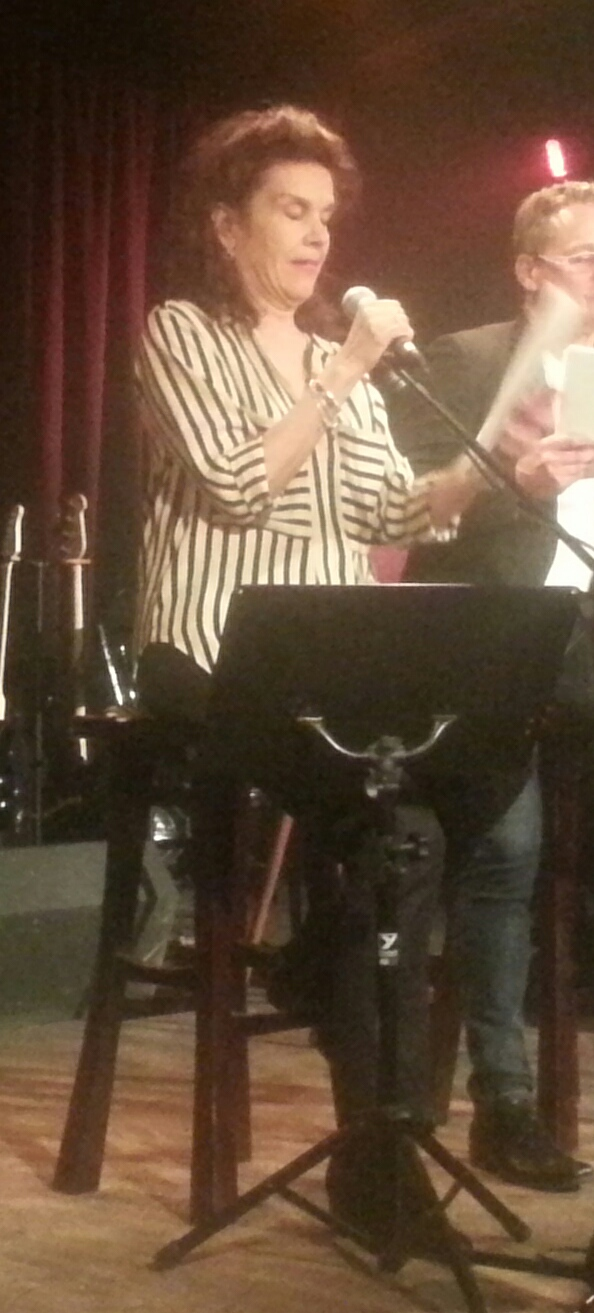
- Faucher in 2016
- Born: 10 April 1958; Montreal, Canada
- Died: 9 June 2026 (aged 68)
- Education: Conservatoire d'art dramatique de Montréal
- Occupations: Actress; scriptwriter
- Spouse: Michel Labrecque
- Children: 1
- Mother: Françoise Faucher

Sophie Faucher (10 April 1958 – 9 June 2026) was a Canadian actress. Starting her career in the 1970s, she worked in play, television, and film productions. She wrote books and plays about Frida Kahlo, who she also portrayed in her play Apasionada ou La Casa Azul.

== Early life and education ==
Sophie Faucher was born in Montreal on 10 April 1958 to actress Françoise Faucher and director Jean Faucher. The Fauchers came to Quebec in 1951. She graduated from the Conservatoire d'art dramatique de Montréal after attending it from 1975 to 1978.

== Career ==
At age 8, she participated in a stage performance of The Blue Bird alongside Marc Labrèche. She joined the National Arts Centre's French theatre troupe in 1978. Her first television role was on Les Fils de la liberté.

Faucher worked as a voice actor and dubbed over Queen Latifah, Julie Christie, and Viola Davis. She was the narrator for Caillou.

Faucher joined the Radio Canada program Star Académie in 2009. She was the co-host of Les Lionnes on Ici Radio-Canada Télé with Chantal Lamarre and Suzanne Lévesque. She was a columnist for Des kiwis et des hommes and Parasol et gobelets.

Faucher became interested in Frida Kahlo after reading her diary. The play Apasionada ou La Casa Azul, written by Faucher and directed by Robert Lepage, premiered in 2001 with Faucher playing the lead role of Kahlo. She created Frida Kahlo – Correspondence, a play based on Kahlo's letters, in 2013. Four children's books about Kahlo were created by Faucher and adapted into an animated series and a film.

The Sophie Faucher Scholarship was established for female performers at the Conservatoire d'art dramatique de Montréal in May 2025.

== Personal life ==
Faucher married Michel Labrecque, with whom she had one child. Faucher was working in the play Le duplex, but withdrew from the production in April 2026 due to poor health. She died from cancer on 9 June 2026.

== Filmography ==
Year	Title	Role	Reference
1982	A Day in a Taxi		
1988	Skin and Bones		
1990	Ding et Dong		
1997	Heads or Tails		
1997	These Children by the Way		
2004	How to Conquer America in One Night		
2005	Le cœur a ses raisons	Crystale Bouvier-Montgomery	
2010	The Comeback		
2012	Laurence Anyways		
2014	I Am An Actress		
2016	Boundaries		
2016	Workplace		
2023	Testament		
2024	Extras		

== Bibliography ==
- La Casa Azul: Inspired by the writings of Frida Kahlo (2002, ISBN 9781849439596)
- Frida, la reine des couleurs (2020, ISBN 9782924959367)
- Je m'appelle Frida Kahlo (2022, ISBN 9782898260889)
- Frida en Gaspésie (2023, ISBN 9782898261107)
- Frida, c'est moi (2023, ISBN 9782924720035)
- Une voix pour être aimée : Maria Callas (A Voice to Be Loved: Maria Callas, 2024, ISBN 9782762146707)
- Maria, Pita et l'opéra (Maria, Pita and the Opera!, 2025, ISBN 9782898262517)

== Works cited ==
=== News ===
- "L'ardente urgence de vivre de Sophie Faucher". Ici Radio-Canada Télé. 9 February 2019. Archived from the original on 11 June 2026.
- Boulanger, Luc (9 June 2026). "La comédienne Sophie Faucher s'éteint à l'âge de 68 ans". La Presse.
- Bourel, Fanny (9 June 2026). "L'actrice Sophie Faucher n'est plus". Ici Radio-Canada Télé. Archived from the original on 11 June 2026.
- Gagnon, Mélyssa (10 June 2026). "Le dramaturge Michel Marc Bouchard rend hommage à la comédienne Sophie Faucher". Ici Radio-Canada Télé. Archived from the original on 14 June 2026.
- Hamel, François (21 September 2024). "Rare sortie en amoureux pour Sophie Faucher et son mari". 7Jours.
- Olson, Isaac (9 June 2026). "Sophie Faucher, acclaimed Quebec actor, dies at 68". Canadian Broadcasting Corporation. Archived from the original on 11 June 2026.
- Peterson, Maureen (17 June 1978). "New NAC French troupe finally becomes a reality". Ottawa Journal. p. 40 – via Newspapers.com.
- Shirley, Don (30 May 2003). "A stiff portrait of Frida Kahlo in 'La Casa Azul'". Los Angeles Times. p. E26 – via Newspapers.com.

=== Web ===
- "Sophie Faucher". Mubi. Archived from the original on 11 June 2026.
