= Mistral Spatial =

- Directed by: Marc-Antoine Lemire
- Written by: Marc-Antoine Lemire
- Produced by: Marc-Antoine Lemire
- Starring: Samuel Brassard; Catherine-Audrey Lachapelle
- Cinematography: Olivier Racine
- Edited by: Anouk Deschênes
- Music by: Pierric Soucy; Lydia Képinski; Kerry Bursey
- Production company: Les films de la Méduse
- Distributed by: H264 Distribution
- Release date: October 31, 2022 (FCIAT)
- Running time: 102 minutes
- Country: Canada
- Language: French

Mistral Spatial is a Canadian science fiction comedy-drama film, written and directed by Marc-Antoine Lemire and released in 2022. The film stars Samuel Brassard as Sam, a young man who breaks up with his girlfriend Cath (Catherine-Audrey Lachapelle); while walking home afterward, he loses consciousness for several hours, and begins to believe that he has been abducted by aliens.

The cast also includes Alex Trahan, Véronique Lafleur, Marie Brassard, Ted Pluviose, Nathalie Claude, Joseph Bellerose, Pascale Drevillon, Sharon Ibgui, Manon Lussier, Ginette Chevalier, Anjo B. Arson, Jacques Piperni, Bernard Arene, Steve Berthelotte, Mario Diamond and Johanne Ductan-Petit.

== Production ==
The film is told in three chapters, with the first depicting the initial breakup and Sam's loss of consciousness, the second depicting the initial aftermath in which Sam reaches and comes to terms with his conclusion that he was abducted, and the third centres on him admitting himself to a group therapy centre after his friends convince him that he's just crazy. Each of the three chapters implements changes in the production, such as the lighting, camera filters or aspect ratios, to convey changes in Sam's mental state.

== Distribution ==
The film premiered at the 2022 Abitibi-Témiscamingue International Film Festival, before opening commercially in January 2023.

== Awards ==
Mathilde Vézina-Bouchard received a Prix Iris nomination for Best Visual Effects at the 25th Quebec Cinema Awards.
