= Manic (2017 film) =

- Directed by: Kalina Bertin
- Written by: Kalina Bertin
- Produced by: Mila Aung-Thwin; Kalina Bertin; Daniel Cross; Bob Moore; Halima Ouardiri; Marina Serrao
- Cinematography: Kalina Bertin
- Edited by: Anouk Deschênes; Hélène Girard
- Music by: Octavio Torija Alvarez
- Production company: EyeSteelFilm
- Release date: April 30, 2017 (Hot Docs)
- Running time: 84 minutes
- Country: Canada
- Language: English

Manic is a 2017 Canadian documentary film directed by Kalina Bertin. The film depicts Bertin's efforts, in response to a family history of bipolar disorder, to investigate parts of her father's prior life in Montserrat that she did not know about; she ultimately uncovers the revelations that her father was a cult leader who also suffered from bipolar disorder, and who had, unbeknownst to Bertin until making the film, also fathered at least 12 other children with four other women.

The film premiered at the 2017 Hot Docs Canadian International Documentary Festival.

== Awards ==
When Daniel Cross won Hot Docs' Don Haig Award, he selected Bertin as the recipient of a $5,000 grant for emerging women documentary filmmakers.

The film received two Canadian Screen Award nominations at the 6th Canadian Screen Awards, for Best Feature Length Documentary and Best Editing in a Documentary (Anouk Deschênes). It was also a Prix Iris nominee for Best Documentary Film and Best Editing in a Documentary at the 20th Quebec Cinema Awards.

The film was shortlisted for the Prix collégial du cinéma québécois in 2019.
