= The Canadiens, Forever =

- Theatrical poster
- French: Pour toujours, les Canadiens!
- Directed by: Sylvain Archambault
- Written by: Jacques Savoie
- Produced by: Cité-Amérique; Luc Martineau; Lorraine Richard
- Starring: Dhanaé Audet-Beaulieu; Antoine L'Écuyer; Céline Bonnier; Christian Bégin; Jean Lapointe; Denis Bernard
- Cinematography: Jérôme Sabourin
- Edited by: Yvann Thibaudeau
- Distributed by: TVA Films
- Release date: 4 December 2009
- Country: Canada
- Language: French

The Canadiens, Forever (French: Pour toujours, les Canadiens!) is a 2009 Quebec long-feature film, about the Montreal Canadiens centennial celebrations written by Jacques Savoie and directed by Sylvain Archambault. The film was launched in theaters on 4 December 2009, the anniversary day of establishment of the Montreal Canadiens enterprise.

== Synopsis ==
At 17, William Lanctôt-Couture (played by Dhanaé Audet-Beaulieu), an ice hockey star player passes through rough times and a depression prior to Christmas. He is unmotivated and lacks purpose and his coach criticizes him for his lack of team spirit. Meanwhile, the troubled player's father Benoît (Christian Bégin) is preoccupied with completing a documentary film about the Montreal Canadiens to the detriment of his family obligations and to the detriment of his player son. His mother Michelle (Céline Bonnier), a nurse, is deeply affected by one of her young patients, Daniel Delage (Antoine L'Écuyer) who at just 10 is awaiting a kidney transplant. William befriends Daniel, a huge ice hockey and Canadiens fan and most of the team is showing up at the hospital to meet Daniel..

== Cast ==
- Dhanaé Audet-Beaulieu : William Lanctôt-Couture
- Antoine L'Écuyer : Daniel Delage
- Céline Bonnier : Michelle Lanctôt-Couture (William's mother)
- Christian Bégin : Benoît Lanctôt-Couture (William's father)
- Jean Lapointe : Ice resurfacer at the Bell Centre
- Denis Bernard : Doctor
- Claude Legault
- Stéphane Jacques
- Réal Bossé
- Émilien Néron
- Doug Jarvis : Himself
- Jean Béliveau : Himself
- Roland Melanson : Himself
- Kirk Muller : Himself
- Guy Carbonneau : Himself
- Montreal Canadiens players of 2008-2009 season: Themselves

== Launching ==
The film was shown as a pre-premiere on 16 November 2009, at Bell Centre, home of the Canadiens. The film was launched on 4 December 2009 on the centenary of the franchise in 100 theatres throughout Quebec.
