= Jean-Simon Leduc =

Canadian actor

Jean-Simon Leduc is a Canadian actor. He is most noted for his performances as Bruno in Love in the Time of Civil War (L'amour au temps de la guerre civile), for which he received a Quebec Cinema Award nomination for Best Supporting Actor at the 18th Quebec Cinema Awards, and as JP in the 2018 film Family First (Chien de garde), for which he received a Prix Iris nomination for Best Actor at the 20th Quebec Cinema Awards.

He has also appeared in the films Shambles (Maudite poutine), Worst Case, We Get Married (Et au pire, on se mariera), Genesis (Genèse), In Broad Daylight (Au grand jour), My Mother's Men (Les Hommes de ma mère) and Redemptions (Rédemptions), and the television series Au secours de Béatrice, Terreur 404, Plan B and Fugueuse.
