= Marc-Antoine Lemire =

Canadian film director (born 1990)

Marc-Antoine Lemire (born 1990) is a Canadian film director and producer. He is most noted for his 2017 short film Pre-Drink, which won the Toronto International Film Festival Award for Best Canadian Short Film at the 2017 Toronto International Film Festival, and the Prix Iris for best Fiction Short Film at the 20th Quebec Cinema Awards.

A graduate of the film studies program at the Université du Québec à Montréal, he won the Prix du meilleur espoir en cinéma documentaire in 2013 for his documentary film Ces trottoirs où nous marchons. He made the short films Plaisirs de table (2012) and Joséphine, ou Chat échaudé craint l'eau froide (2013) before breaking through to wider attention with his 2015 short film Inner Jellyfishes (Les Méduses), which screened at film festivals across Canada and internationally.

In 2022, he released Mistral Spatial, his full-length directorial debut. The film stars Samuel Brassard in the lead role and was produced by Lemire himself. Mistral Spatial was made with a very small budget for its ambition and was released in theaters in Quebec in 2023.

In 2024, he also directed the short film Extras, after more than 2 years and a half of the film being in post-production. The film stars Isabelle Giroux and Sophie Faucher and was screened at film festivals, winning awards including the FIPRESCI International Critic award and the Public Prize at Festival Regard, and the Black Horse at Fantasia International Film Festival.

In 2025, Lemire released the short film Mad Dog (Molosse), starring Caroline Néron and Francois Edouard Bernier (also co-writer). The film premiered at the Fantasia International Film Festival where it won the First Prize Award for Best Quebecois Short Film.

Lemire also works in the art department for other films as a propmaster and key props.

== Filmography ==
=== Short films ===
- Plaisirs de table - 2012
- Joséphine, ou Chat échaudé craint l'eau froide - 2013
- Inner Jellyfishes (Les Méduses) - 2015
- Pre-Drink - 2017
- Extras - 2023
- Mad Dog (Molosse) - 2025

=== Feature films ===
- Mistral Spatial - 2022
