= Family First (film) =

- Film poster
- Directed by: Sophie Dupuis
- Written by: Sophie Dupuis
- Produced by: Étienne Hansez
- Starring: Jean-Simon Leduc; Théodore Pellerin; Maude Guérin; Claude Laberge
- Cinematography: Mathieu Laverdière
- Edited by: Dominique Fortin
- Music by: Dead Obies
- Production company: Axia Films
- Release date: 9 March 2018
- Running time: 87 minutes
- Country: Canada
- Language: French
- Budget: $1.5 million

Family First (French: Chien de garde, lit. 'Watch Dog') is a 2018 Canadian crime film, written and directed by Sophie Dupuis. The film premiered at the Rendez-vous du cinéma québécois. It is about a family in Verdun, Montreal, Quebec, including the protagonist JP (Jean-Simon Leduc), whose uncle Dany (Paul Ahmarani) leads a drug cartel. It was nominated for four Canadian Screen Awards, including Best Motion Picture, winning Best Actor for Théodore Pellerin.

Family First was selected as the Canadian entry for the Best Foreign Language Film at the 91st Academy Awards, but it was not nominated.

== Plot ==
In Verdun, Quebec, Dany runs an illegal drug cartel. His nephews, JP and the younger Vincent, who's 19, work in deliveries and "collections". JP and Vincent travel through Verdun to a Chinese restaurant possessing drugs on Dany's territory, harass the staff and empty the tills; they also intimidate others to coerce them to stop selling on the family territory. JP is dating Mel, who is alarmed about Vincent's erratic behavior, and she suggests to JP that Vincent needs help. Mel sleeps with JP at JP and Vincent's residence, where they live with their mother Joe; however, Mel tries to persuade JP to move in with her. Vincent frequently sleeps in his mother's bed.

Dany tells JP that he wants a woman, Chantal, killed. JP resists, but Dany harangues him for telling him how to run his business. Dany also warns JP that if JP does not take the job, he will enlist Vincent to do it. JP also becomes aware Dany has been sending a large number of text messages to Mel; Dany tells her via text that JP is a "fag" and she should leave him. JP and Dany break into Chantal's residence, but JP finds Chantal's children are present, and he pulls out with Vincent, leaving Chantal alive. Outside, JP tells Vincent their situation is spiraling out of control and that they should leave the cartel. Vincent disagrees, saying this is what they share. At the dinner table, Vincent also accuses Mel of wanting to leave them, and warns her not to take JP with her. Vincent says he is marries to his family, JP and Joe.

Dany is enraged that JP has failed to kill Chantal, and gives the job to Vincent. JP attempts to warn Chantal. Vincent attempts to ambush Chantal with a gun, but Chantal is accompanied by a man who is also armed. The man intimidates Vincent, forcing him to drop his gun. Dany visits Joe's residence to express his anger, but when he leaves he is gunned down.

== Cast ==
- Jean-Simon Leduc as JP
- Théodore Pellerin as Vincent
- Maude Guérin as Joe
- Claudel Laberge as Mel
- Paul Ahmarani as Dany

== Production ==
Family First was Dupuis' first feature film, with a total budget of $1.5 million. She received a $500,000 grant from the Cultural Enterprise Development Corporation for production. After a location scout in Montreal, Dupuis stated: "I chose Verdun because I didn't want to go over territory that was already so well-worn. I discovered Verdun when we were scouting. It was really born out of this desire to place this family in a village within a city".

== Reception ==
=== Critical response ===
Marc-André Lussier, writing for La Presse, awarded Family First four stars, calling it a rare great debut for a Quebec director, proclaiming "Wow!" Le Soleil's Éric Moreault assessed the film as a poignant exploration of the dysfunctional family, citing Dupuis' direction and Théodore Pellerin's performance. Le Devoir critic Odile Tremblay cited Pellerin and Maude Guérin for their acting.

=== Accolades ===
Family First received several nominations at the Prix Iris, including for Best Film. It was selected as the Canadian entry for the Best Foreign Language Film at the 91st Academy Awards, but it was not nominated.

Award	Date of ceremony	Category	Recipient(s)	Result	Ref(s)
Canadian Screen Awards	31 March 2019	Best Motion Picture	Étienne Hansez	Nominated	
Canadian Screen Awards	31 March 2019	Best Director	Sophie Dupuis	Nominated	
Canadian Screen Awards	31 March 2019	Best Actor	Théodore Pellerin	Won	
Canadian Screen Awards	31 March 2019	Discovery Award	Sophie Dupuis	Nominated	
Prix collégial du cinéma québécois	2019	Best Film	Family First	Nominated	
Prix Iris	3 June 2018	Best Film	Étienne Hansez	Nominated	
Prix Iris	3 June 2018	Best Director	Sophie Dupuis	Nominated	
Prix Iris	3 June 2018	Best Screenplay	Sophie Dupuis	Nominated	
Prix Iris	3 June 2018	Best Actor	Jean-Simon Leduc	Nominated	
Prix Iris	3 June 2018	Best Actress	Maude Guérin	Won	
Prix Iris	3 June 2018	Best Editing	Dominique Fortin	Won	
Prix Iris	3 June 2018	Best Original Music	Dead Obies	Nominated	
Prix Iris	3 June 2018	Revelation of the Year	Théodore Pellerin	Won	
Whistler Film Festival	December 2018	Alliance of Women Film Journalists EDA Award		Won	

== See also ==
- List of submissions to the 91st Academy Awards for Best Foreign Language Film
- List of Canadian submissions for the Academy Award for Best Foreign Language Film
