= Ravenous (2017 film) =

- Theatrical poster
- French: Les Affamés
- Directed by: Robin Aubert
- Screenplay by: Robin Aubert
- Produced by: Stéphanie Morissette
- Starring: Marc-André Grondin; Monia Chokri; Brigitte Poupart; Luc Proulx; Charlotte St-Martin
- Cinematography: Steeve Desrosiers
- Edited by: Francis Cloutier
- Music by: Pierre-Philippe Côté
- Production company: Le Maison de Prod
- Distributed by: Les Films Séville
- Release dates: 8 September 2017 (TIFF); 20 October 2017 (Canada)
- Running time: 96 minutes
- Country: Canada
- Language: French
- Budget: CA$3.7 million
- Box office: $182,883

Ravenous (French: Les Affamés) is a 2017 French-language Canadian horror film written and directed by Robin Aubert and starring Marc-André Grondin, Monia Chokri, Brigitte Poupart, Luc Proulx, Charlotte St-Martin and Micheline Lanctôt. The film depicts the residents of a small town in rural Quebec as they deal with an outbreak leading to an attack by zombie-like people.

Ravenous was released to positive reviews for its social themes. It won the Toronto International Film Festival Award for Best Canadian Film and was nominated for five Canadian Screen Awards, including Best Motion Picture, winning Best Make-Up.

== Plot ==
In the aftermath of a zombie-like outbreak, the rural regions of Quebec are decimated with few survivors remaining. Bonin and his friend Vézina patrol with shotguns, shooting the infected while amusing each other with doctor jokes. While out, Vézina is drawn out into the forest, surrounded, and attacked. Another survivor, wife and mother Céline, drives, alone, and kills the infected as she fights them with a machete. Céline wanders onto the property of two elderly, armed women, Thérèse and Pauline, who tell Céline to strip so they can see if she has been bitten. Upon seeing Céline is clean, they take her in.

Bonin meets Tania, a young woman with a bite mark, who swears she was bitten by a dog and not an infected. While Tania is initially tied down for safety reasons, Bonin unties her and drives her away as the infected close in. They pick up a little girl, Zoé. Bonin also spots infected in a field and spies on them. He observes that they are gathered around a stack of found objects they have assembled in a mysterious ritual.

Bonin, Tania, and Zoé head back to Thérèse and Pauline's house, as Bonin knows them. Together, the group realizes the house is on the path of the infected invasion. As the infected swarm in, the group flees. They encounter two other survivors, the elderly former insurance agent Réal and the young Ti-Cul, who is armed with a rifle. The group unites and finds a cabin. Inside, they find a note from an anonymous survivor warning anyone who reads it to stay away from town and stating the author is looking for survivors on Quebec Route 113. Pauline is bitten and shot by Thérèse. Réal, having been bitten earlier, turns, bites Ti-Cul, and is dispatched by Céline, who also kills Ti-Cul before he can turn.

The advancing infected overrun the remaining survivors. Thérèse stays behind so Bonin can escape with Zoé and is killed. Surrounded, Céline begins hacking against the oncoming undead. Bonin gives Zoé to Tania and leads the infected away, as Tania hides Zoé in a tunnel and tells her Zoé is the strongest. Tania disappears as the infected continue to swarm. When Zoé emerges, she finds Bonin pointing his shotgun at his own head. Bonin tells her to go look for Tania, and Zoé sets off alone for Route 113, passing another infected-made structure. On the road, she is picked up by a survivor in a racecar (seen in the opening of the film) after warning him to not continue on the road.

In a post-credits scene, the newly zombified Bonin and Tania stand in front of a tower of stacked chairs on which stands a parrot.

== Cast ==
- Marc-André Grondin as Bonin
- Monia Chokri as Tania
- Brigitte Poupart as Céline
- Luc Proulx as Réal
- Charlotte St-Martin as Zoé
- Marie-Ginette Guay as Thérèse
- Didier Lucien as Vézina

== Production ==
Aubert cited the cinema of Robert Bresson and Andrei Tarkovsky as influences. Aubert cast Brigitte Poupart over Facebook, after asking her, without explaining he was working on a story about a zombie-like infection, "Oh, by the way, have you ever trapped an animal?" Ravenous was made on a production budget of CA$3.7 million, of which 1.05 million came from the Société de développement des entreprises culturelles (SODEC) and 1.15 million came from Telefilm Canada.

== Release ==
Ravenous premiered at the Toronto International Film Festival in September 2017. It was then featured at the Fantastic Fest in Austin, Texas later in the month. Netflix acquired the film and released it on 2 March 2018 outside Canada, Latin America and Eastern Europe. It was removed in March 2025.

=== Critical reception ===
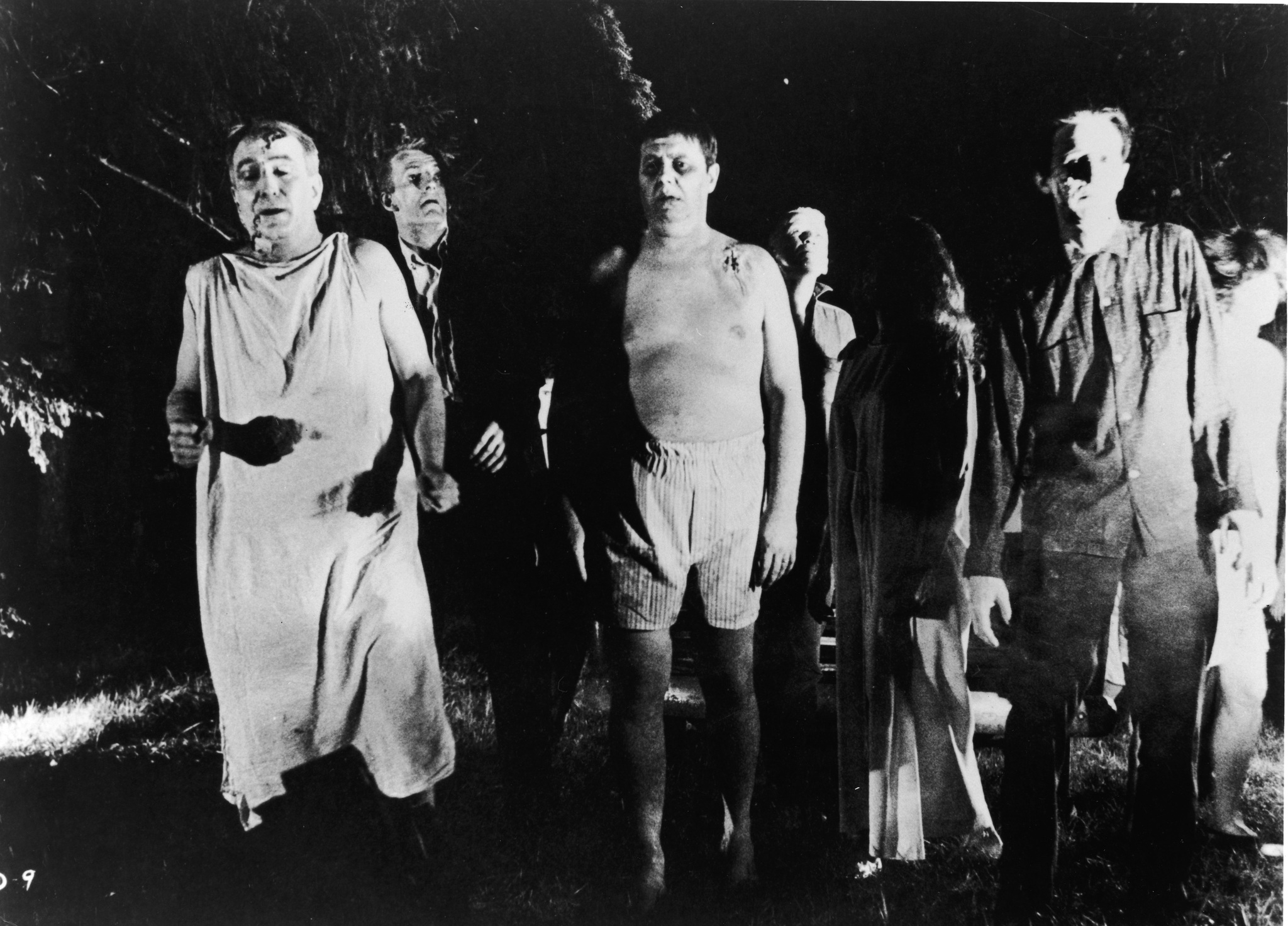
The film's survival themes were compared to those in the 1968 zombie film Night of the Living Dead.

On the review aggregator website Rotten Tomatoes, the film has an approval rating of 89% based on 27 reviews, with an average rating of 6.8/10.

For The Montreal Gazette, T'cha Dunlevy praised the film as a successful reinvention of the zombie genre, and "At once wildly funny, philosophical, scary as heck when it has to be and boldly cinematic throughout". In his review for The Globe and Mail, Robert Everett-Green judged The Ravenous as an allegory for Quebec politics, saying Aubert invented a culture for the zombies, complete with their own goods and hints of a zombie religion. They become an invading threat to the culture of Quebec, tied into the Battle of the Plains of Abraham and the contemporary debate over the niqab, including Bill 62, Everett-Green wrote. Chantal Guy awarded Ravenous four stars in La Presse, and argued it featured themes of survival found in previous zombie cinema such as Night of the Living Dead, adding commentary about social identity and how society is already being "zombified".

In December, TIFF named the film to its annual Canada's Top Ten list of the ten best Canadian films.

=== Accolades ===
At TIFF, the film won the award for Best Canadian Film.

| Award | Date of ceremony | Category | Recipient(s) | Result | Ref(s) |
|---|---|---|---|---|---|
| Canadian Screen Awards | 11 March 2018 | Best Motion Picture | Stéphanie Morissette | Nominated | |
| Canadian Screen Awards | 11 March 2018 | Best Director | Robin Aubert | Nominated | |
| Canadian Screen Awards | 11 March 2018 | Best Supporting Actress | Brigitte Poupart | Nominated | |
| Canadian Screen Awards | 11 March 2018 | Best Original Score | Pierre-Philippe Côté | Nominated | |
| Canadian Screen Awards | 11 March 2018 | Best Make-Up | Erik Gosselin, Marie-France Guy | Won | |
| Festival du nouveau cinéma | 2017 | Temps Audience Award | Robin Aubert | Won | |
| Prix collégial du cinéma québécois | 2018 | Best Film | Ravenous | Nominated | |
| Prix Iris | 3 June 2018 | Best Film | Stéphanie Morissette | Won | |
| Prix Iris | 3 June 2018 | Best Director | Robin Aubert | Won | |
| Prix Iris | 3 June 2018 | Best Supporting Actress | Brigitte Poupart | Won | |
| Prix Iris | 3 June 2018 | Best Supporting Actress | Micheline Lanctôt | Nominated | |
| Prix Iris | 3 June 2018 | Best Sound | Jean-Sébastien Beaudoin Gagnon, Stéphane Bergeron, Olivier Calvert | Won | |
| Prix Iris | 3 June 2018 | Best Original Score | Pierre-Philippe Côté | Won | |
| Prix Iris | 3 June 2018 | Best Make-Up | Erik Gosselin, Marie-France Guy | Won | |
| Prix Iris | 3 June 2018 | Best Visual Effects | Jean-François Ferland | Won | |
| Prix Iris | 3 June 2018 | Most Successful Film Outside Quebec | Robin Aubert | Won | |
| Toronto International Film Festival | 7 – 17 September 2017 | Best Canadian Film | Robin Aubert | Won | |
