= Kalina Bertin =

Filmmaker

Kalina Bertin is a Canadian documentary filmmaker, most noted for her 2017 film Manic.

A graduate of the film studies program at the Université du Québec à Montréal, she made Manic about her siblings' struggles with bipolar disorder. She ultimately uncovered the story of her biological father, a Montserratian cult leader who also suffered from bipolar disorder, and who had, unbeknownst to Bertin until making the film, also fathered at least 12 other children with four other women.

Manic premiered at the 2017 Hot Docs Canadian International Documentary Festival, where Bertin was selected by Daniel Cross of EyeSteelFilm as the recipient of a $5,000 grant for emerging women documentary filmmakers.

Manic received a Canadian Screen Award nomination for Best Feature Length Documentary at the 6th Canadian Screen Awards, and a Prix Iris nomination for Best Documentary Film at the 20th Quebec Cinema Awards. The film was also shortlisted for the Prix collégial du cinéma québécois in 2019.

Bertin has also been a cinematographer and camera operator on other documentary films, including Byblos, Prisons Without Bars (Prisons sans barreaux) and 7 Beats per Minute.
