= Side Orders =

2001 Canadian short film

- French: Foie de canard et cœur de femme
- Directed by: Stéphane Lapointe
- Written by: Stéphane Lapointe
- Produced by: Christiane Ciupka; Marie-Josée Larocque
- Starring: Suzanne Clément; Christian Bégin
- Cinematography: Jean-François Lord; Robert Mattigetz
- Edited by: Nathalie Lysight
- Production company: Locomotion Films
- Release date: October 31, 2001
- Running time: 13 minutes
- Country: Canada
- Language: French

Side Orders (French: Foie de canard et cœur de femme, lit. "Duck's Liver and Woman's Heart") is a 2001 Canadian drama short film written and directed by Stéphane Lapointe. The film stars Suzanne Clément as Hélène, a woman whose boyfriend Jérôme (Christian Bégin) is a manipulative jerk.

The film received a Genie Award nomination for Best Live Action Short Drama at the 22nd Genie Awards in 2002. In advance of the Genie Award ceremony on February 7, it was screened at the Bloor Cinema on January 27, as the opening film to a screening of the Best Picture nominee Eisenstein.
