= Resurrecting Hassan =

- French: La résurrection d’Hassan
- Directed by: Carlo Guillermo Proto
- Written by: Carlo Guillermo Proto
- Produced by: Carlo Guillermo Proto; Roxanne Sayegh; Pablo Villegas; Maria Paz Gonzalez
- Cinematography: Carlo Guillermo Proto
- Edited by: Carlo Guillermo Proto; Lorenzo Mora
- Music by: Olivier Alary
- Production company: Handshake Productions
- Distributed by: Les Films du 3 mars
- Release date: November 11, 2016 (RIDM)
- Running time: 100 minutes
- Country: Canada
- Languages: English; French

Resurrecting Hassan (French: La résurrection d’Hassan) is a Canadian documentary film, directed by Carlo Guillermo Proto and released in 2016. The documentary centres on the Hartings, a family of blind musicians in Montreal who supported themselves by busking in the Guy–Concordia station of the Montreal Metro.

The film premiered at the Montreal International Documentary Festival in November 2016.

== Awards ==
The film was screened at the 2017 Hot Docs Canadian International Documentary Festival, where it won a Special Jury Prize.

The film received two Canadian Screen Award nominations at the 6th Canadian Screen Awards, for Best Feature Length Documentary and Best Cinematography in a Documentary (Proto). It won the Prix Iris for Best Documentary Film at the 20th Quebec Cinema Awards in 2018.

Resurrecting Hassan was shortlisted for the Prix collégial du cinéma québécois in 2018.
