= Train to Nowhere =

- French: À quelle heure le train pour nulle part
- Directed by: Robin Aubert
- Written by: Robin Aubert
- Produced by: Derek Kennedy
- Starring: Luis Bertrand
- Cinematography: Robin Aubert
- Edited by: Robin Aubert
- Music by: Yves Desrosiers; Matthew Burton
- Production company: Lynx Films
- Release date: September 18, 2009
- Running time: 78 minutes
- Country: Canada
- Language: French

Train to Nowhere (French: À quelle heure le train pour nulle part, lit. "What Time Is the Train to Nowhere") is a Canadian drama film, directed by Robin Aubert and released in 2009. The film stars Luis Bertrand as a man from Quebec who has travelled to India in search of his missing brother.

Bertrand was the only professional actor in the film's cast, which otherwise comprised local amateurs, including Arumi Watanabe and Richard Bracnaza, in small roles.

The film was billed on its release as the first film in a "Fantômes et voyages" pentalogy of films that would each take place on a different continent, although as of 2024 only his 2016 film Tuktuq has been indicated as a followup installment in that project.
