= Overpass (film) =

- French: Viaduc
- Directed by: Patrice Laliberté
- Written by: Patrice Laliberté
- Produced by: Julie Groleau; Patrice Laliberté
- Starring: Téo Vachon Sincenne; Sandrine Bisson; Stéphane Jacques; Jérémie Gagnon; Guillaume Laurin; Joakim Robillard; Filip Pekacki
- Cinematography: Christophe Dalpé
- Edited by: François Lamarche
- Production company: Couronne Nord
- Distributed by: Travelling, les films qui voyagent
- Release date: September 13, 2015 (Toronto International Film Festival)
- Running time: 19 min.
- Country: Canada

Overpass (French: Viaduc) is a 2015 Canadian short film directed by Patrice Laliberté.

Overpass was shot in September 2014.

The film was presented by Telefilm Canada at the Cannes Marché du Film in May 2015.

Overpass had its world premiere at the 2015 Toronto International Film Festival, where it won the Short Cuts Award for Best Canadian Short Film.

The film was included in the list of Canada's Top Ten short films for 2015, chosen by a panel of five filmmakers and industry professionals. It was also selected for inclusion in "The Shortest Day", a program of free screenings of short films, in several Canadian cities, in conjunction with the winter solstice.
