= Dead Obies =

Canadian experimental hip hop band

- Origin: South Shore (Montreal), Quebec, Canada
- Genres: Experimental hip hop; post-rap; punk rap
- Years active: 2011-present
- Label: Bonsound
- Members: Joe Rocca; Snail Kid; 20some O.G. Bear
- Past members: Yes McCan; VNCE
- Website: www.deadobies.com

Dead Obies is an experimental hip hop band originating from South Shore (suburbs south of Montreal), Quebec, Canada, that was formed in 2011 by a collective of five MCs: Jo RCA, Yes McCan, Snail Kid, 20Some and O.G. Bear, and Quebec producer Vince Carter. The group identifies itself as post-rap. They are signed to the independent label Bonsound.

Dead Obies finished as Top 3 finalists at the Francouvertes de Montréal held in 2013 and designed for new music talents. The group has also taken part in Francofolies de Montréal, "WordUP! Battles" and "Artbeat" artistic events in Quebec. They use a mix of French, English, and French/English known as franglais in their songs. Their single "Do or Die + In America" was broadcast on French Canadian stations and the music video played on MusiquePlus .

They released their first mixtape in April 2012 titled Collation Vol. 1 followed by the album Montréal $ud (digital and vinyl format) in 2013.

In 2014, one year after the release of Montréal $ud, Dead Obies released the album in CD format and a book. In 2018, they received a Prix Iris nomination for Best Original Music for their work in the film Family First (Chien de garde).

In the spring of 2018, Yes McCan, one of the founding members of Dead Obies, left to pursue other projects. The third album was launched without his contribution.

== Musical style ==
The musical style of Dead Obies is often considered to be a blend of Québécois hip-hop and "post-rap". The group raps in both French and English (often referred to as franglais, and often switches languages in the middle of a sentence. This code-switching between the two languages is representative of the Montreal culture more broadly.

== Discography ==
=== Albums ===
- 2013: Montréal $ud
- 2016: Gesamtkunstwerk
- 2019: DEAD.

=== EP ===
- 2017: "Air Max"

=== Mixtapes ===
- 2012: Collation Vol. 1
- 2014: Collation Vol. 2 – Limon Verde: La experiencia

=== Singles ===
- 2013: "Tony Hawk"
- 2013: "Montréal $ud"
- 2014: "Do or Die + In America"
- 2015: "Aweille !"
- 2015 : "Jelly"
- 2016: "Where They @"
- 2016: "Everyday"
- 2016: "Explosif"
- 2016: "Waiting"
- 2017: "Monnaie"
- 2018: "Break"
- 2018: Run Away
- 2018: André
- 2019: Doo Wop
