= Christian Bégin =

Canadian actor

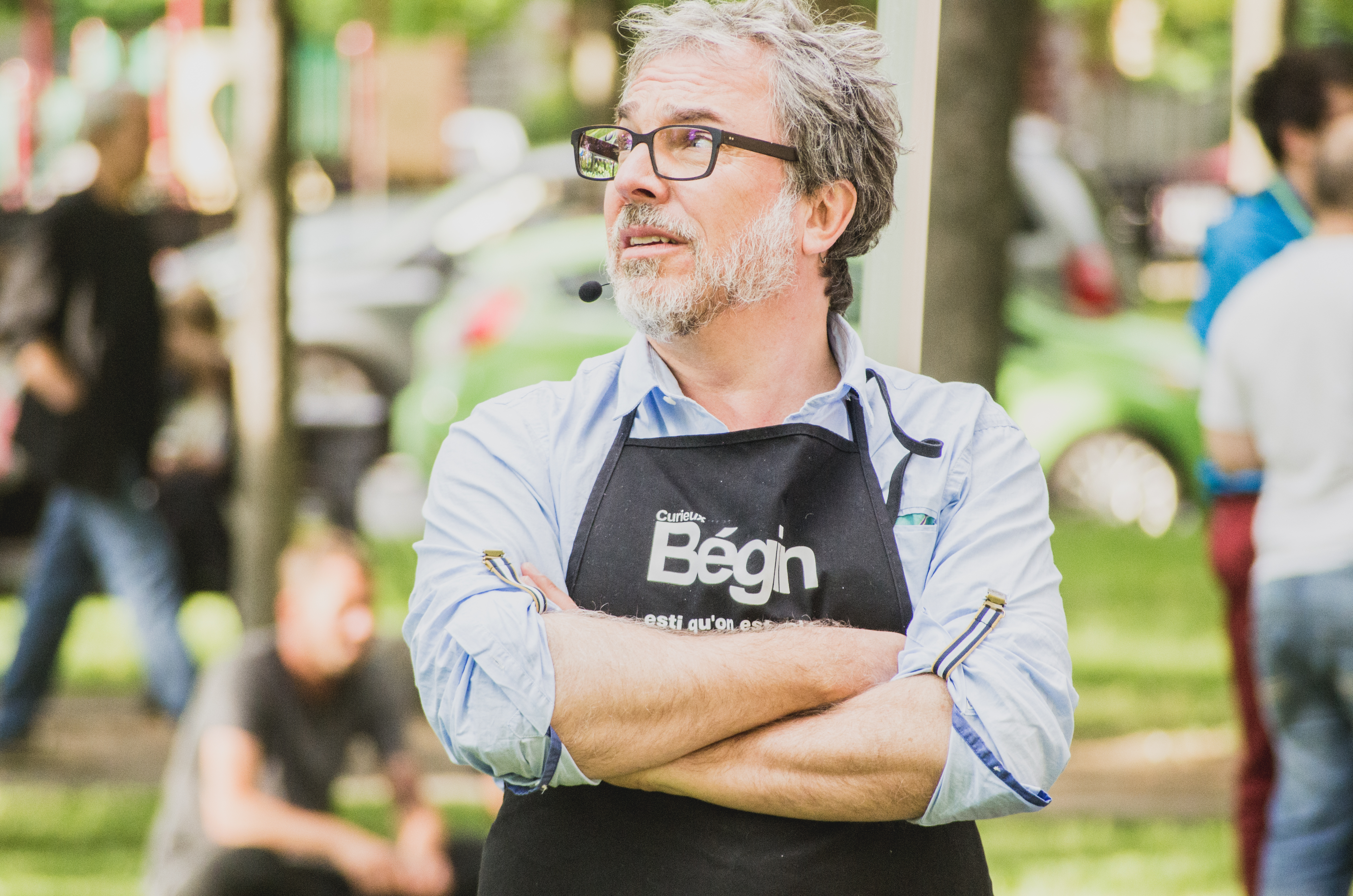
Christian Bégin in 2016

Christian Bégin (born March 16, 1963, in Montreal, Quebec) is a Canadian actor, who won the Prix Iris for Best Actor at the 20th Quebec Cinema Awards in 2018 for his performance in Infiltration (Le problème d'infiltration).

His film roles have included Nelligan, Side Orders (Foie de canard et cœur de femme), The Pig's Law (La loi du cochon), The Collector (Le Collectionneur), My Daughter, My Angel (Ma fille, mon ange) Surviving My Mother (Comment survivre à sa mère), 9 (9, le film), The Canadiens, Forever (Pour toujours, les Canadiens!) and Nina Roza, and the television series Trauma.

== Biography ==
Christian Bégin was born on March 16, 1963 in Saint-Léonard, now a borough of Montreal. In high school, he was a boarder at Collège de Laval, where he resided on weekdays during the school year. During this period, he joined a pastoral group and lived with a community of 13 Catholic brothers. He now identifies as an atheist.

In 2004, he sparked controversy by publicly criticizing the attitude of certain producers and directors who allegedly chose actors for films based on their potential to "draw a crowd" (box-office appeal) rather than their talent.

On March 22, 2006, along with Sylvie Léonard, he signed an open letter published in La Presse denouncing the influence of audience ratings on the editorial choices of Quebec television networks. He also hosts the interview show Y a du monde à messe on Télé-Québec. He has been in a relationship with actress Marie-Ève Perron since 2021. The couple married in 2023.

In 2019, he starred as a transgender prostitute in the comedy-drama series Can You Hear Me? (M'entends tu?), and appeared in the film Mon ami Walid.

=== Cuisine and local products ===
Since 2007, he has hosted the television show Curieux Bégin, a culinary program on Télé-Québec. The show highlights Quebec gastronomy, local products, and regional artisans (terroir). Through encounters with chefs, producers, and food enthusiasts, he explores the culinary riches of Quebec.

In 2017, Christian Bégin launched a line of frozen ready-made meals called Les Curieux Produits (The Curious Products), sold in IGA grocery stores in Quebec. Six dishes were available: chicken meatballs, meat pie (pâté à la viande), tourtière from the Lac-Saint-Jean region, meatball stew (ragoût de boulettes), meatloaf, and pork polpettes. These dishes, made with local meats and vegetables, did not achieve the expected success and were withdrawn from the market in 2019. A series of wines, Curieux Vino, was also offered at the SAQ. In association with Richard O'Neill, a range of coffee, Curieux Café, was launched in 2018. The coffee beans are soaked in seawater from the Magdalen Islands and sun-dried before roasting. All these products were offered through La Curieuse Compagnie, a company owned by Christian and Katherine Daoust.

His commitment to local agriculture is also shown through his participation in projects promoting Quebec products. He participated in the Mange ton Saint-Laurent (Eat your St. Lawrence) campaign, a project launched in 2020 during the COVID-19 pandemic, aimed at encouraging the consumption of local marine resources and raising public awareness about the importance of food self-sufficiency.

In 2021, he became co-owner, with chef Marie-Fleur St-Pierre, of the delicatessen Le Jardin du Bedeau in Kamouraska. This village grocery store regularly collaborates with producers from the region and from across Quebec.
