= The Memories of Angels =

- French: La Mémoire des anges
- Directed by: Luc Bourdon
- Produced by: Christian Medawar
- Edited by: Michel Giroux
- Production company: National Film Board of Canada
- Release date: 2008
- Running time: 80 minuntes
- Country: Canada

The Memories of Angels (French: La Mémoire des anges) is a 2008 collage film by Luc Bourdon.

== Summary ==
Created entirely from stock footage from over 120 National Film Board of Canada (NFB) films, as an homage to the city of Montreal in the 1950s and 1960s. Bourdon incorporates material from films by such well-known directors as Michel Brault, Claude Jutra, Gilles Groulx, Denys Arcand and Arthur Lipsett.

== Production ==
Created by the NFB to help mark its 70th anniversary, the idea for the film had originated 15 years earlier, during a conversation between Bourdon and NFB producer Colette Loumède about making a documentary film entirely from other movies. Pouring over the vintage footage, Bourdon chose his hometown of Montreal — also the headquarters of the NFB — to be the central character of the film, since no other actor would appear throughout the film.

== Accolades ==
The film received the award for best Quebec film at the Festival du Nouveau Cinema. It was also chosen by the Toronto International Film Festival for that year's Canada's Top Ten.

== Sequel ==
A sequel film, The Devil's Share (La Part du diable), was released in 2018, using the same format to present a portrait of Montreal in the 1970s.

== See also ==
- Montreal Stories, an anthology film about Montreal
- Of Time and the City, a collage film about Liverpool
- Arthur Lipsett
