= Cherry (2023 film) =

- Directed by: Laurence Gagné-Frégeau
- Written by: Laurence Gagné-Frégeau
- Starring: Marie-Lise Chouinard
- Cinematography: Laurence Gagné-Frégeau
- Edited by: Laurence Gagné-Frégeau
- Music by: Marie-Lise Chouinard; Christian David
- Distributed by: Spira
- Release date: March 24, 2023 (Regard)
- Running time: 23 minutes
- Country: Canada
- Language: French

Cherry is a Canadian short documentary film, directed by Laurence Gagné-Frégeau and released in 2023. The film is a portrait of Marie-Lise Chouinard, a writer and actress who died of cancer in 2022.

The film premiered in March 2023 at the Regard short film festival in Saguenay, Quebec.

The film received a Canadian Screen Award nomination for Best Short Documentary at the 12th Canadian Screen Awards in 2024, and was a nominee in the short films category for the 2024 Prix collégial du cinéma québécois.
