= Étienne Hansez =

Canadian film producer

- Born: Quebec, Canada
- Occupation: Producer
- Known for: Producing feature films of Sophie Dupuis
- Notable work: Family First; Underground; Solo

Étienne Hansez is a Canadian film producer from Quebec. He is most noted as the producer of Sophie Dupuis's feature films Family First (Chien de garde), Underground (Souterrain) and Solo.

Family First was a Canadian Screen Award nominee for Best Picture at the 7th Canadian Screen Awards and a Prix Iris nominee for Best Film at the 20th Quebec Cinema Awards, and Underground was a Canadian Screen Award nominee for Best Picture at the 9th Canadian Screen Awards and a Prix Iris nominee for Best Film at the 23rd Quebec Cinema Awards.
