= Luc Bourdon (filmmaker) =

Quebec filmmaker, festival director and film professor

Luc Bourdon (born 1952) is a Canadian documentary filmmaker and video artist from Quebec known for his 2008 film The Memories of Angels. His other films have included La Grande Bibliothèque (2005), Classes de Maîtres (2009) and Une vie pour deux (2013).

A former executive director of the Festival du nouveau cinéma, he was commissioned to create 50 temps, a short documentary film about the history of the festival, for the 2021 event on the occasion of its 50th anniversary.

== Accolades ==
The Memories of Angels (La Mémoire des anges), his ode to 1950s/60s Montreal from previous National Film Board of Canada titles, won a Jutra Award nominee for Best Documentary Film at the 11th Jutra Awards in 2009, and its 2018 sequel The Devil's Share (La Part du diable), which focused on 1970s Montreal, was a nominee for Best Documentary at the 20th Quebec Cinema Awards in 2018 and a Canadian Screen Award nominatee for Best Feature Length Documentary at the 7th Canadian Screen Awards in 2019.

== See also ==
- Arthur Lipsett
- Cinema of Canada
