= Barefoot at Dawn =

- French: Pieds nus dans l'aube
- Directed by: Francis Leclerc
- Written by: Francis Leclerc; Fred Pellerin
- Based on: Pieds nus dans l'aube by Félix Leclerc
- Produced by: Antonello Cozzolino
- Starring: Justin Leyrolles-Bouchard; Roy Dupuis; Catherine Sénart; Robert Lepage
- Cinematography: Steve Asselin
- Edited by: Isabelle Malenfant
- Music by: Luc Sicard
- Production company: Attraction Images
- Distributed by: Les Films Séville
- Release date: September 20, 2017 (Quebec City Film Festival)
- Running time: 105 minutes
- Country: Canada
- Language: French

Barefoot at Dawn (French: Pieds nus dans l'aube) is a Canadian drama film from Quebec, directed by Francis Leclerc and released in 2017. Written by Leclerc and Fred Pellerin as an adaptation of Félix Leclerc's semi-autobiographical novel Pieds nus dans l'aube, the film stars Justin Leyrolles-Bouchard as the young Félix Leclerc growing up in La Tuque, Quebec. Roy Dupuis and Catherine Sénart also appear as Félix's parents, Leo and Fabiola Leclerc, and Robert Lepage as his uncle Rodolphe.

The film represented Francis Leclerc's first attempt to openly address his legacy as the son of Félix Leclerc, one of Quebec's musical icons, in his own work.

The film received three Prix Iris nominations at the 20th Quebec Cinema Awards in 2018: Best Cinematography (Steve Asselin), Best Costume Design (Josée Castonguay) and Best Visual Effects.
