= Underground (2020 film) =

2020 Canadian film

- Film poster
- French: Souterrain
- Directed by: Sophie Dupuis
- Written by: Sophie Dupuis
- Produced by: Étienne Hansez
- Starring: Joakim Robillard; Théodore Pellerin; James Hyndman
- Cinematography: Mathieu Laverdière
- Edited by: Michel Grou
- Music by: Gaëtan Gravel; Patrice Dubuc
- Production company: Bravo Charlie
- Distributed by: Axia Films
- Release date: December 5, 2020 (Whistler Film Festival)
- Running time: 97 minutes
- Country: Canada
- Language: French

Underground (French: Souterrain) is a 2020 Canadian drama film, written and directed by Sophie Dupuis. Produced by the Montreal-based company Bravo Charlie, the film stars Joakim Robillard as Maxime, a troubled miner in Val-d’Or, Quebec, who must attempt to rescue his coworkers when an explosion happens inside the mine.

The cast also includes Théodore Pellerin as Julien, his friend and former coworker who has suffered from aphasia since being injured in a car accident for which Maxime was responsible, as well as James Hyndman, Guillaume Cyr, Catherine Trudeau, Mickaël Gouin, Chantal Fontaine, Bruno Marcil and Jean L'Italien.

The film entered production in 2019, and was scheduled to premiere at the 2020 Festival du nouveau cinéma on October 7, 2020. The event was cancelled due to severe weather. It subsequently had its world premiere screening at the 2020 Whistler Film Festival, where Dupuis won the Borsos Competition award for Best Director of a Canadian Film.

The film was set to be theatrically released in the province of Quebec on April 30, 2021, but due to continued restrictions related to the COVID-19 pandemic in Canada its release was delayed, and the film finally opened commercially on June 4.

Underground was the opening film of the Rendez-vous Québec Cinéma film festival on April 28, 2021.

== Synopsis ==
Maxime, a young miner from Val-d'Or, faces events that challenge his definition of masculinity. Thanks to the brotherhood he can count on in his working environment, Maxime sets out on his long journey on the road to redemption. But when an explosion erupts underground, the young man, newly graduated in mine rescue, plunges into the mine lair with the firm intention of bringing each of his colleagues back alive.

== Accolades ==
| Award | Date of ceremony | Category | Recipient(s) | Result | Ref(s) |
|---|---|---|---|---|---|
| Borsos Competition | 2020 | Best Director of a Canadian Film | Sophie Dupuis | Won | |
| Canadian Screen Awards | May 20, 2021 | Best Motion Picture | Étienne Hansez | Nominated | |
| Canadian Screen Awards | May 20, 2021 | Best Director | Sophie Dupuis | Nominated | |
| Canadian Screen Awards | May 20, 2021 | Best Actor | Joakim Robillard | Nominated | |
| Canadian Screen Awards | May 20, 2021 | Best Original Screenplay | Sophie Dupuis | Nominated | |
| Prix Iris | June 6, 2021 | Best Film | Étienne Hansez | Nominated | |
| Prix Iris | June 6, 2021 | Best Director | Sophie Dupuis | Nominated | |
| Prix Iris | June 6, 2021 | Best Supporting Actor | James Hyndman | Nominated | |
| Prix Iris | June 6, 2021 | Best Supporting Actor | Théodore Pellerin | Won | |
| Prix Iris | June 6, 2021 | Revelation of the Year | Joakim Robillard | Nominated | |
| Prix Iris | June 6, 2021 | Best Screenplay | Sophie Dupuis | Won | |
| Prix Iris | June 6, 2021 | Best Costume Design | Caroline Bodson | Nominated | |
| Prix Iris | June 6, 2021 | Best Cinematography | Mathieu Laverdière | Won | |
| Prix Iris | June 6, 2021 | Best Editing | Michel Grou | Nominated | |
| Prix Iris | June 6, 2021 | Best Original Music | Patrice Dubuc, Gaëtan Gravel | Nominated | |
| Prix Iris | June 6, 2021 | Best Sound | Luc Boudrias, Frédéric Cloutier, Patrice LeBlanc | Won | |
| Prix Iris | June 6, 2021 | Best Makeup | Audray Adam, Sandra Ruel | Nominated | |
| Prix Iris | June 6, 2021 | Best Casting | Marjolaine Lachance | Nominated | |
| Cinéfest Sudbury International Film Festival | 2021 | Outstanding French-Language Feature Film | Sophie Dupuis | Won | |
| Prix collégial du cinéma québécois | 2022 | Best Film | Underground | Won | |
