= Saint Martyrs of the Damned =

- French: Saints-Martyrs-des-Damnés
- Directed by: Robin Aubert
- Written by: Robin Aubert
- Produced by: Luc Vandal; Roger Frappier
- Starring: François Chénier; Patrice Robitaille; Isabelle Blais
- Cinematography: Steve Asselin
- Edited by: Michel Arcand
- Music by: Yves Desrosiers
- Production company: Max Films
- Distributed by: Christal Films
- Release date: September 10, 2005 (TIFF)
- Running time: 115 minutes
- Country: Canada
- Language: French

Saint Martyrs of the Damned (French: Saints-Martyrs-des-Damnés) is a Canadian drama film, directed by Robin Aubert and released in 2005. The film stars François Chénier as Flavien Juste, a tabloid reporter who writes about strange paranormal phenomena; when he is sent to the small Quebec town of Saints-Martyrs-des-Damnés to investigate a series of strange disappearances, his photographer colleague Armand (Patrice Robitaille) disappears as well, but he finds the townspeople actively impeding his efforts to locate his friend.

The cast also includes Isabelle Blais, Guy Vaillancourt, Monique Mercure, Monique Miller, Sylvie Boucher, Pierre Collin, Michel Forget, Carl Hennebert-Faulkner, Germain Houde, Renaud Lacelle-Bourdon, André Lacoste, Mathilde Lavigne, Hubert Loiselle, Alexis Martin, Alec Poirier, David Savard and Luc Senay.

The film premiered at the 2005 Toronto International Film Festival in September 2005, before going into commercial release in October.

== Critical response ==
Eddie Cockrell of Variety called the film a hybrid of William Castle and David Lynch, writing that "For the first 45 minutes or so, Aubert seems torn between spoofing horror film conventions and telling a straight-ahead story. The nearly continuous reappearance of the dead bride gives rise to a procession of cheap shock effects that become absurdly amusing even as they continue to sting auds. Indeed, story’s set-up is so transparently thin that it’s a credit to helmer’s genre savvy that second and third act events obliterate the initial skepticism. Cockeyed tributes abound, from nods to mainstream screamers Night of the Living Dead and The Texas Chainsaw Massacre to more esoteric fare such as Lynch’s Twin Peaks and even 2004 Hungarian chiller After the Day Before."

== Awards ==
Steve Asselin received a Jutra Award nomination for Best Cinematography at the 8th Jutra Awards in 2006.
