= The Immaculate Conception (novel) =

1994 novel by Gaétan Soucy

- First edition cover
- Author: Gaétan Soucy
- Original title: L'Immaculée conception
- Translator: Lazer Lederhendler
- Cover artist: Richard Parent
- Language: French
- Genre: Psychological novel
- Publisher: Laterna Magica
- Publication date: 1994
- Publication place: Montreal
- English publication date: April 28, 2006
- Media type: Print (Paperback)
- Pages: 344 pp
- ISBN: 9782980317217
- OCLC: 33600825

The Immaculate Conception (French: L'Immaculée conception) is a novel by Gaétan Soucy, first published in 1994. The English translation by Lazer Lederhendler was published in 2006.

The book was named the winner of the 2007 Quebec Writers' Federation Prize for Translation at the Quebec Writers' Federation Awards. The novel was also a finalist for the 2006 Canada Council for the Arts Governor General’s Literary Awards, one of five books shortlisted for the 2006 Scotiabank Giller Prize—Canada's largest annual prize for fiction—and was also one of four novels nominated for the 2006 ReLit Awards.

== Author and translator ==
The author of four novels, Canadian Gaétan Soucy's first novel, L'Immaculée conception, received rave reviews—both in Quebec and abroad—and established him "as a powerful new literary force in Quebec". Soucy studied physics at l’Université de Montréal, and took a Master's degree in philosophy at McGill University, where he also studied Japanese and literature. He lived and worked in Montreal, Quebec.

In addition to the 2006 Governor General’s Literary Awards, Lazer Lederhendler is the translator of two other books nominated for the award. The Sparrow Has Cut The Day In Half, his French to English translation of Claire Dé's Bonheur, oiseau rare, was one of the five nominees for the 1999 Governor General’s Literary Award for "Translation (French to English)", and his translation of Pierre Tourangeau's Larry Volt was one of the finalists for the same award in 2002. He teaches English in Montreal.

== Plot introduction ==
The Immaculate Conception has been described as echoing "the writing of Edgar Allan Poe and Fyodor Dostoevsky" and illuminating the "sublime, the uncanny, and the horrific that burns at the core of ordinary lives". Set in the mid-1920s in the isolated, working-class parish of Nativité in East-end Montreal, the novel chronicles the aftermath of a deadly fire—75 people die when a neighborhood restaurant is burned to the ground by an arsonist.

The cast of characters includes a pianist, mortician, bank clerk, a clubfooted school teacher, demonic fire chief, demented lumberjack, and the bank clerk's father. In spite of (or because of) the characters' oddities, they become nearly cartoon characters—extremely memorable stereotypes. Chronicling the "ordinary" lives after the inferno, the story gradually reveals a series of horrific events from the clerk's childhood and ultimately the reader is reminded that some crimes will forever remain secrets.
