= Tuktuq =

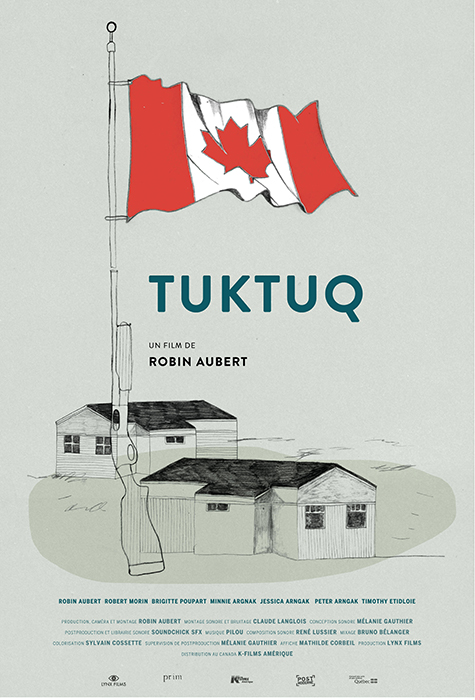
- Directed by: Robin Aubert
- Written by: Robin Aubert
- Produced by: Robin Aubert
- Starring: Robin Aubert; Robert Morin; Brigitte Poupart
- Cinematography: Robin Aubert
- Edited by: Robin Aubert
- Music by: René Lussier
- Production companies: Lynx Films; PRIM Centre D'arts Médiatiques; Post-Moderne
- Distributed by: K Films Amérique
- Release date: November 1, 2016
- Running time: 95 minutes
- Country: Canada
- Language: French

Tuktuq is a Canadian docufiction film from Quebec, directed by Robin Aubert and released in 2016. The film stars Aubert as Martin Brodeur, a cameraman who is sent to a small Inuit village in the Nunavik region of Quebec as part of a government project to film the community, but soon learns that the reason behind the project is that the residents are about to be forcibly displaced as part of a major new hydroelectricity development.

The film's cast also includes Robert Morin in a voice role as the government minister, and Brigitte Poupart as his ex-girlfriend. It was made while Aubert was on a cultural exchange residency in Kangiqsujuaq in 2012.

The film was billed as the second part of a "Fantômes et voyages" pentalogy of films that would each take place on a different continent, following Train to Nowhere (À quelle heure le train pour nulle part) in 2009. As of 2024, no further films in the series have been released.

The film received three Prix Iris nominations at the 20th Quebec Cinema Awards in 2018: Best Picture, Best Supporting Actor (Morin) and Best Editing (Aubert).
