= Inner Jellyfishes =

2015 Canadian short drama film

- Film poster
- French: Les Méduses
- Directed by: Marc-Antoine Lemire
- Written by: Marc-Antoine Lemire
- Produced by: Marc-Antoine Lemire; Olivier Racine; Maria Gracia Turgeon
- Starring: Rudi Duperré; Samuel Brassard; Jade Hassouné
- Cinematography: Olivier Racine
- Edited by: Anouk Deschênes
- Music by: Benoît Lemire
- Production company: Les films de la Méduse
- Release date: January 2015
- Running time: 24 minutes
- Country: Canada
- Language: French

Inner Jellyfishes (French: Les Méduses) is a Canadian short drama film, directed by Marc-Antoine Lemire and released in 2015. The film stars Rudi Duperré as a young gay man struggling with feelings of isolation who hooks up with another man (Samuel Brassard) for sex, but finds that the encounter intensifies rather than assuaging his loneliness as he experiences a desire for a deeper emotional connection than the hookup is willing or able to offer.

The film's screenings included the 2015 Image+Nation festival and the 2015 San Francisco International Festival of Short Films, where it won the Vanguard Award. It was screened at BFI Flare in 2016 as part of a program of films about chemsex, with the website The Conversation praising it as one of the only films in the program that did not moralize about the practice.
