= Pre-Drink =

- Directed by: Marc-Antoine Lemire
- Produced by: Maria Gracia Turgeon; Marc-Antoine Lemire
- Starring: Alex Trahan; Pascale Drevillon
- Cinematography: Léna Mill-Reuillard
- Edited by: Anouk Deschênes
- Production companies: Les films de la Méduse; Midi la Nuit
- Release date: September 17, 2017 (TIFF)
- Running time: 23 minutes
- Country: Canada
- Language: French

Pre-Drink is a Canadian dramatic short film by Marc-Antoine Lemire, which won the Toronto International Film Festival Award for Best Canadian Short Film at the 2017 Toronto International Film Festival.

The film stars Alex Trahan as Carl and Pascale Drevillon as Alexe, a gay man and a transgender woman whose longtime friendship is complicated when they drunkenly decide to have sex.

In December, TIFF named the film to its annual Canada's Top Ten list of the ten best Canadian short films. The film received a Canadian Screen Award nomination for Best Live Action Short Drama at the 6th Canadian Screen Awards, and won the Prix Iris for Best Short Film at the 20th Quebec Cinema Awards.
