= Boost (film) =

- Directed by: Darren Curtis
- Written by: Darren Curtis
- Produced by: Frédéric Bohbot; Kieran Crilly
- Starring: Nabil Rajo; Jahmil French; Oluniké Adeliyi
- Cinematography: Pawel Pogorzelski
- Edited by: Jared Curtis
- Music by: Mike Silver
- Production companies: Bunbury Films; Havelock Films
- Distributed by: Filmoption
- Release date: 2016
- Running time: 95 minutes
- Country: Canada
- Language: English

Boost is a 2016 Canadian drama film written and directed by Darren Curtis.

The film stars Nabil Rajo and Jahmil French as Hakeem and Anthony/"A-Mac", teenagers in the Park Extension neighbourhood of Montreal who work at Hakeem's uncle's car wash while simultaneously maintaining a sideline pursuit of passing on tips about valuable cars to the neighbourhood's gang of car thieves. One day, however, they decide to try their hands at undertaking an auto theft themselves. The film's cast also includes Fanny Mallette, Oluniké Adeliyi, Patrick Goyette, Théodore Pellerin and Juliette Gariépy.

The film was originally written to be about characters of South Asian background, but was rewritten in a Black Canadian context when Rajo and French were cast as the leads. The film was released concurrently in both the original English and dubbed French versions.

== Cast ==
- Nabil Rajo as Hakeem Nour
- Jahmil French as Anthony 'A-Mac' Macdonald
- Ntare Mwine as Ramaz 'Ram'
- Fanny Mallette as Madame Tessier
- Patrick Goyette as Detective Belanger
- Juliette Gariépy as Maxine
- Oluniké Adeliyi as Amina Nour
- Brent Skagford as Ilija
- Marc Rowland as Aleksy
- Juliette Gosselin as Anna
- Théodore Pellerin as Dev
- Émeraude Lapointe-Provost as Daphne
- Jean Petitclerc as Mr. Dibiase
- Djibril Toure as Ali Nour

== Accolades ==
The film received five Canadian Screen Award nominations at the 6th Canadian Screen Awards in 2018.

Award	Date of ceremony	Category	Recipient(s)	Result	Ref(s)
Austin Film Festival	26 October 2017 – 2 November 2017	Best Narrative Feature Honourable Mention	Darren Curtis	Won	
Canadian Screen Awards	11 March 2018	Best Actor	Nabil Rajo	Won	
Canadian Screen Awards	11 March 2018	Best Supporting Actor	Jahmil French	Nominated	
Canadian Screen Awards	11 March 2018	Best Supporting Actress	Oluniké Adeliyi	Nominated	
Canadian Screen Awards	11 March 2018	Best Overall Sound	Philippe Attié	Nominated	
Canadian Screen Awards	11 March 2018	Best Original Song	Joey Sherrett, Chris Gordon and Nathaniel Huskinson: "CTS Thief"	Nominated	
Prix Iris	3 June 2018	Best Film	Frédéric Bohbot, Kieran Crilly	Nominated	
Prix Iris	3 June 2018	Best Director	Darren Curtis	Nominated	
Prix Iris	3 June 2018	Best Screenplay	Darren Curtis	Nominated	
Prix Iris	3 June 2018	Best Supporting Actor	Jahmil French	Nominated	
Prix Iris	3 June 2018	Best Editing	Jared Curtis	Nominated	
Prix Iris	3 June 2018	Best Original Music	Michael Silver	Nominated	
Prix Iris	3 June 2018	Revelation of the Year	Nabil Rajo	Nominated	
Prix Iris	3 June 2018	Best Casting	Maxime Giroux, Jonathan Oliveira	Nominated	
