= Infiltration (2017 film) =

- Film poster
- French: Le problème d'infiltration
- Directed by: Robert Morin
- Written by: Robert Morin
- Produced by: Luc Vandal
- Starring: Christian Bégin; Sandra Dumaresq; Guy Thauvette; William Monette
- Cinematography: Robert Morin
- Edited by: Robert Morin
- Release date: 2 August 2017
- Running time: 93 minutes
- Country: Canada
- Language: French

Infiltration (French: Le problème d'infiltration) is a 2017 Canadian psychological thriller film directed by Robert Morin. It is about a plastic surgeon named Dr. Louis Richard, played by Christian Bégin, who treats a patient with a burn injury; the patient brings a lawsuit against him. The film premiered at the Fantasia International Film Festival, and was selected for a screening at the 2017 Vancouver International Film Festival. Principal photography took place over 17 days, wrapping up on 22 February 2016.

== Reception ==
Radio-Canada critics commended the film for its atmosphere and intense direction, comparing it to the work of Michael Haneke and Roman Polanski. For La Presse, Marc-Andre Lussier awarded it four stars, hailing it as one of Morin's best films and for its atmosphere of anxiety. Le Devoir's Francois Levesque praised Morin as one of the best directors in the Cinema of Quebec and Infiltration as an "opus".

=== Accolades ===
Infiltration led in nominations at the Prix Iris, including with a nomination for Best Film.

Award	Date of ceremony	Category	Recipient(s) and nominee(s)	Result	Ref(s)
Prix collégial du cinéma québécois	2018	Best Film	Infiltration	Won	
Prix Iris	3 June 2018	Best Film	Luc Vandal	Nominated	
Prix Iris	3 June 2018	Best Director	Robert Morin	Nominated	
Prix Iris	3 June 2018	Best Screenplay	Robert Morin	Nominated	
Prix Iris	3 June 2018	Best Actor	Christian Bégin	Won	
Prix Iris	3 June 2018	Best Supporting Actor	Guy Thauvette	Nominated	
Prix Iris	3 June 2018	Best Supporting Actress	Sandra Dumaresq	Nominated	
Prix Iris	3 June 2018	Best Art Direction	André-Line Beauparlant	Nominated	
Prix Iris	3 June 2018	Best Original Music	Bertrand Chenier	Nominated	
Prix Iris	3 June 2018	Best Make-Up	Kathryn Casault, Stéphane Tessier	Nominated	
Prix Iris	3 June 2018	Best Visual Effects	Jean-François Ferland, Olivier Péloquin, Simon Harrisson	Nominated	
