= The Devil's Share (film) =

- French: La Part du diable
- Directed by: Luc Bourdon
- Produced by: Colette Loumède
- Edited by: Michel Giroux
- Production company: National Film Board of Canada
- Release date: 2017
- Running time: 102 minutes
- Country: Canada
- Language: French

The Devil's Share (French: La Part du diable) is a Canadian documentary film, directed by Luc Bourdon and released in 2017. A sequel to his 2008 film The Memories of Angels (La Mémoire des anges), the film is a collage film which uses clips from past National Film Board of Canada films to present a portrait of Montreal in the 1970s.

The film received Prix Iris nominations for Best Documentary, Best Editing in a Documentary (Michel Giroux) and Best Sound in a Documentary (Catherine Van Der Donckt, Jean Paul Vialard) at the 20th Quebec Cinema Awards in 2018, winning the award for Best Sound. It received a Canadian Screen Award nomination for Best Feature Length Documentary, and Michel Giroux was nominated for Best Editing in a Documentary, at the 7th Canadian Screen Awards in 2019.
