= Nabil Rajo =

Eritrean-Canadian actor

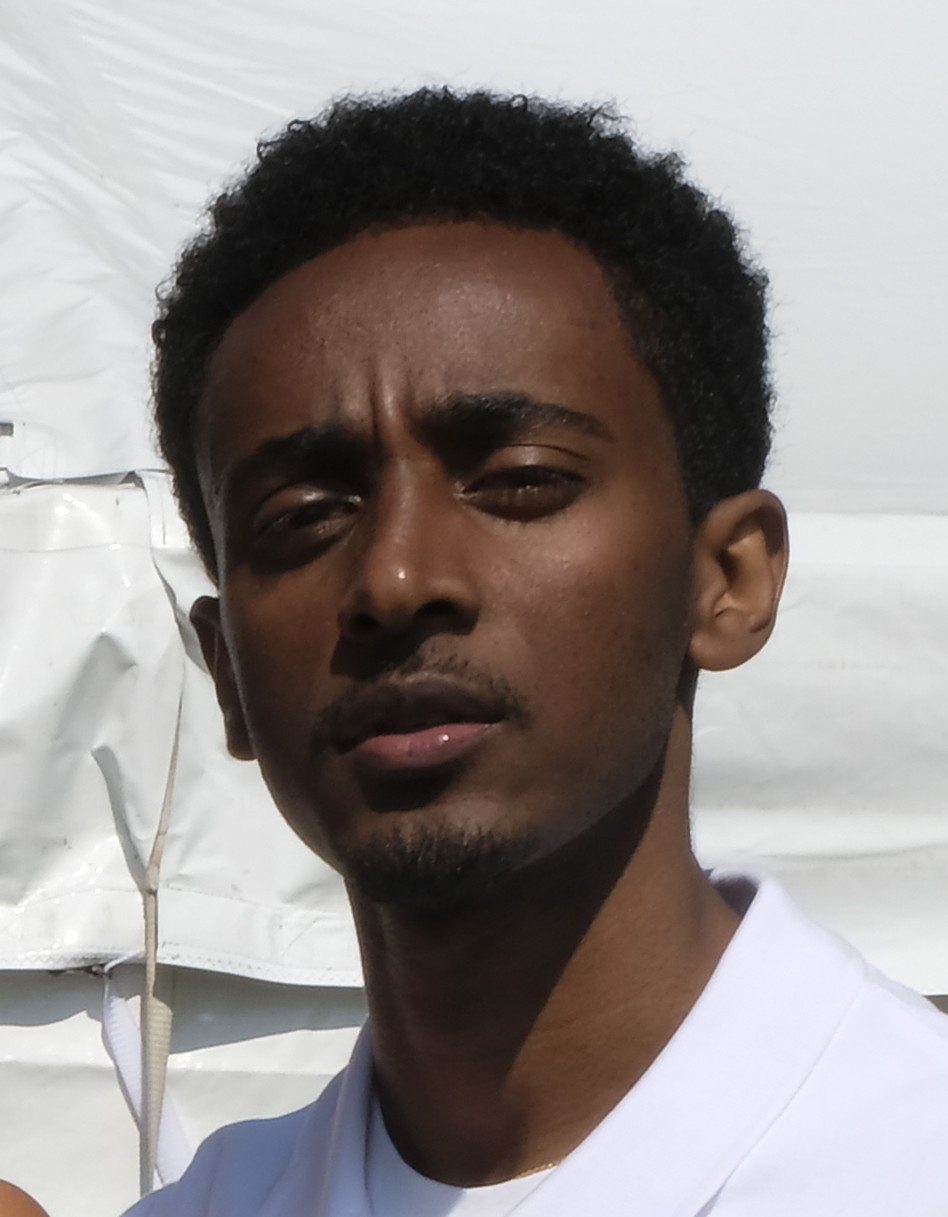
- Born: Asmara, Eritrea
- Occupation: Actor
- Awards: Canadian Screen Award

Nabil Rajo is an Eritrean-Canadian actor. He is most noted for his performance in the film Boost, for which he won the Canadian Screen Award for Best Actor at the 6th Canadian Screen Awards, and received a Prix Iris nomination for Revelation of the Year at the 20th Quebec Cinema Awards.

He was born in Asmara, Eritrea. He emigrated to Canada with his family at the age of six.

In 2017, he received a Dora Mavor Moore Award nomination for Outstanding Performance, Male in the Independent Theatre division for his performance in the Coal Mine Theatre production of Tracy Letts's play Superior Donuts. He has also appeared in supporting or guest roles in the television series Man Seeking Woman, Remedy, Rookie Blue, Suits, and What We Do in the Shadows.
