= Extras (2024 film) =

- Directed by: Marc-Antoine Lemire
- Written by: Marc-Antoine Lemire
- Produced by: Fanny Drew; Sarah Mannering
- Starring: Isabelle Giroux; Sophie Faucher
- Cinematography: Simran Dewan
- Edited by: Anouk Deschênes; Marc-Antoine Lemire
- Production company: Colonelle Films
- Distributed by: Travelling Distribution
- Release date: March 20, 2024 (Regard)
- Running time: 15 minutes
- Country: Canada
- Language: French

Extras is a Canadian short comedy film, directed by Marc-Antoine Lemire and released in 2024. The film stars Isabelle Giroux as Isabelle, an actress whose career is in a rut, as she meets with her agent Johanne (Sophie Faucher) to discuss a new role.

The cast also includes Samuel Brassard, Véronique Lafleur and Joseph Bellerose in supporting roles.

The film premiered in March 2024 at the Regard short film festival, where it won the FIPRESCI International Critics’ Prize and the Audience Award. The film was shortlisted for the Prix collégial du cinéma québécois in 2025.
