= Far Away Lands (film) =

2017 Canadian documentary film

- French: Les Terres lointaines
- Directed by: Félix Lamarche
- Written by: Félix Lamarche
- Produced by: Félix Lamarche
- Cinematography: Samuel de Chavigny
- Edited by: Sophie B. Sylvestre
- Music by: Mimi Allard
- Production company: La Limite Films
- Distributed by: Les Films du 3 mars
- Release date: February 27, 2017 (RVCQ)
- Running time: 98 minutes
- Country: Canada
- Languages: English; Dutch; Tagalog; Cebuano

Far Away Lands (French: Les Terres lointaines) is a Canadian documentary film, directed by Félix Lamarche and released in 2017. The film takes place over the course of two months aboard a cargo ship crewed by a mix of Dutch and Filipino sailors, centring on the contrast between their conflicting desires for the freedom of being out on the ocean and the security of having a stable home.

The film premiered at the 2017 Rendez-vous du cinéma québécois.

Louis-Paul Rioux of Le Devoir compared the film to Félix Dufour-Laperrière's 2014 documentary Transatlantic (Transatlantiques), noting that a key distinction between the two was that Dufour-Laperrière's film was more abstract and poetic, while Lamarche's was more centred on the emotional lives of the sailors.

== Awards ==
Award	Date of ceremony	Category	Recipient(s)	Result	Ref.
Rendez-vous du cinéma québécois	2017	Prix Pierre-et-Yolande-Perrault	Félix Lamarche	Won	
Prix Iris	2018	Best Cinematography in a Documentary	Samuel de Chavigny	Nominated	
Prix Iris	2018	Best Sound in a Documentary	Sylvain Bellemare, Bernard Gariépy Strobl, Félix Lamarche	Nominated	
