= Joakim Robillard =

Canadian actor from Quebec

Joakim Robillard is a Canadian actor from Quebec. He is most noted for his performance in the 2020 film Underground (Souterrain), for which he received a Canadian Screen Award nomination for Best Actor at the 9th Canadian Screen Awards, and a Prix Iris nomination for Revelation of the Year at the 23rd Quebec Cinema Awards.

He has also had supporting roles in the films Overpass (Viaduc), King Dave and Dusk for a Hitman (Crépuscule pour un tueur), and has appeared in the television series Blue Moon, GAME(R), Béliveau, Can You Hear Me? (M'entends tu?) and Mégantic.
