= Clearing Skies =

2002 Canadian short film directed by Rosa Zacharie

- French: Une éclaircie sur le fleuve
- Directed by: Rosa Zacharie
- Written by: Rosa Zacharie
- Produced by: Barbara Shrier
- Starring: Jean Lapointe; Isabel Richer
- Cinematography: Steve Asselin
- Edited by: Francis Leclerc
- Music by: Christian Bouchard
- Production companies: Les Productions Dixie; Palomar
- Distributed by: Alliance Vivafilm
- Release date: October 2002 (FCIAT)
- Running time: 27 minutes
- Country: Canada

Clearing Skies (French: Une éclaircie sur le fleuve, lit. "A Clearing on the River") is a Canadian short drama film, directed by Rosa Zacharie and released in 2002. The film stars Jean Lapointe and Isabel Richer as a father and daughter who are struggling to heal their tense and fraught relationship.

The film premiered at the Abitibi-Témiscamingue International Film Festival in October 2002.

It was a Genie Award nominee for Best Live Action Short Drama at the 23rd Genie Awards in 2003. It was later screened at the 2003 CFC Worldwide Short Film Festival, where it won the award for Best Cinematography in a Canadian Short Film.

It was subsequently distributed as a bonus feature on the DVD release of the theatrical feature film Looking for Alexander (Mémoires affectives).
