= Worst Case, We Get Married =

2017 film by Léa Pool

- French: Et au pire, on se mariera
- Directed by: Léa Pool
- Written by: Sophie Bienvenu; Léa Pool
- Produced by: Lyse Lafontaine; Elisa Garbar; François Tremblay
- Starring: Sophie Nélisse; Karine Vanasse; Jean-Simon Leduc
- Cinematography: Denis Jutzeler
- Edited by: Michel Arcand
- Music by: Michel Arcand
- Production companies: Louise Productions; Lyla Films; SRG SSR
- Release date: August 24, 2017
- Running time: 90 minutes
- Countries: Canada; Switzerland
- Language: French
- Budget: C$3 million

Worst Case, We Get Married (French: Et au pire, on se mariera) is a 2017 Canadian-Swiss drama film directed by Léa Pool and co-written by Pool and Sophie Bienvenu. Adapted from the novel by Sophie Bienvenu, the film stars Sophie Nélisse and Karine Vanasse. It follows Aïcha, a 14-year-old girl who develops strong feelings for an older man. In 2017, Pool received the Vancouver International Film Festival's Women in Film and Television Artistic Merit Award for the film. That year, it also won the Young Jury Prize at the Französische Filmtage Tübingen-Stuttgart.

== Synopsis ==
Aïcha is a 14-year old girl who lives with her mother, whose relationship with her has deteriorated since her mother threw out her Algerian stepfather. She meets Baz, a much older man for whom she starts to develop strong feelings.

== Cast ==
The cast includes:

- Sophie Nélisse as Aïcha
- Jean-Simon Leduc as Baz
- Karine Vanasse as Isabelle
- Mehdi Djaadi as Hakim

== Production ==
The film was written by Léa Pool and Sophie Bienvenu, based on Bienvenu’s novel of the same name. Produced as a Quebec-Swiss co-production by Lyla Films and Louise Productions, it had an approximate budget of C$3 million. Filming took place in Montreal from 29 August to 8 October 2016.

== Reception ==
OutNow praised Sophie Nélisse’s performance and wrote that the film’s indie soundtrack worked well, while noting that the flashbacks somewhat disrupted an otherwise well-told story.

== Awards and nominations ==
In 2017, Léa Pool received the Vancouver International Film Festival's Women in Film and Television Artistic Merit Award for the film. That year, the film also won the Young Jury Prize at the Französische Filmtage Tübingen-Stuttgart. In 2018, Vanasse received a Prix Iris nomination for Best Supporting Actress at the 20th Quebec Cinema Awards.

== Festival screenings ==
In 2017, the film was screened at festivals including the 10th Festival du Film Francophone d'Angoulême, the Festival de Cinéma de la Ville de Québec, the 36th Vancouver International Film Festival and the 13th Zurich Film Festival. In 2018, it was screened at the 53rd Solothurner Filmtage.
