= Josée Castonguay =

Canadian costume designer

Josée Castonguay is a Canadian costume designer in film and television. She is most noted for her work on the films Barefoot at Dawn (Pieds nus dans l'aube), for which she was a Prix Iris nominee for Best Costume Design at the 20th Quebec Cinema Awards in 2018, and The Time Thief (L'Arracheuse de temps), for which she was a Canadian Screen Award nominee for Best Costume Design at the 10th Canadian Screen Awards in 2022.

She has also been a frequent Gémeaux Award nominee for her work in television, winning in 2009 for Les Hauts et les bas de Sophie Paquin.
