= Antoine L'Écuyer =

Canadian actor

Antoine L'Écuyer (born March 26, 1997, in Montreal, Quebec) is a French Canadian actor known for his lead role of Léon Doré in It's Not Me, I Swear! (C'est pas moi, je le jure!) for which he won the Best Actor Award at the Atlantic Film Festival. He is also known for his role as Daniel Delage, a sick Montreal Canadiens fan in the film Pour toujours, les Canadiens!.

He is the grandson of actor Guy L'Écuyer.

== Filmography ==
- 2007: Les Boys as Gabriel Toupin (TV, 1 episode)
- 2008: It's Not Me, I Swear! (C'est pas moi, je le jure!) as Léon Doré
- 2009: The Canadiens, Forever (Pour toujours, les Canadiens!) as Daniel Delage
- 2010: Les Rescapés
- 2013: The Four Soldiers (Les 4 soldats)
- 2014: La Garde
- 2015: Chorus
- 2015: The Sound of Trees (Le Bruit des arbres)
- 2015: Corbo
- 2015-2019: Jérémie
- 2017: The Little Girl Who Was Too Fond of Matches
- 2018: My Dad Works The Night Shift (Mon père travaille de nuit) as Vincent (Short Film)
- 2019: Living 100 MPH (Vivre à 100 milles à l'heure)

=== Dubbing ===
- 2009: Astro Boy (voice over for the film's French edition)

== Awards ==
- In 2009, won Best Actor for role in It's Not Me, I Swear! (C'est pas moi, je le jure!) at the Atlantic Film Festival (Halifax, Nova Scotia, Canada)
