= Anouk Deschênes =

Canadian film editor

Anouk Deschênes is a Canadian film editor, who won the Prix Iris for Best Editing in a Documentary at the 20th Quebec Cinema Awards in 2018 for her work on the film Manic.

She was also nominated in the same category for Wintopia at the 23rd Quebec Cinema Awards in 2021, and has been a two-time Canadian Screen Award nominee for Best Editing in a Documentary at the 6th Canadian Screen Awards in 2018 for Manic and at the 12th Canadian Screen Awards in 2024 for The Longest Goodbye.

Originally from Sainte-Thérèse, Quebec, she is a graduate of the Université du Québec à Montréal.

Her other credits have included the films Inner Jellyfishes (Les Méduses), Pre-Drink, Brotherhood, See You Garbage! (Au plaisir les ordures!), Mistral Spatial, The Sparkle (L'Artifice) and Still Night, Burning House.
