= The Little Girl Who Was Too Fond of Matches =

1998 novel by Gaétan Soucy

1st edition

The Little Girl Who Was Too Fond of Matches (French: La petite fille qui aimait trop les allumettes) is a novel by Canadian novelist Gaétan Soucy. It was one of the novels chosen for inclusion in the French version of Canada Reads, broadcast on Radio-Canada in 2004, where it was championed by actor, film director, screenwriter, and musician Micheline Lanctôt. The book caused a sensation in Quebec and was immediately translated into more than ten languages. It was translated into English as The Little Girl Who Was Too Fond of Matches by Sheila Fischman.

== Plot ==
The novel is about two siblings who live in complete isolation with their father. They are both his "sons". One day the father kills himself by hanging and his sons decide one of them needs to go to the nearby village to get a coffin. While in the village it is revealed that one of the sons is actually a female, although she has no concept of that (she has no idea of sexuality and thinks she was castrated when she was very young and that is why she doesn't have testicles). It also becomes apparent she has been being used for sex by her brother and there are even more nefarious occurrences which have been happening on their property. However; she has such little understanding of the outside world, that she believes all of this to be completely normal and rejects the outsiders' views of her family situation.

The main character's only source of knowledge is from the books found in her household library. Most of these books are medieval stories about chivalry, knighthood and saving princesses. She becomes somewhat infatuated with the mine inspector she meets In the village who questions her about her living situation. She impulsively tries to get him to have sex with her, although this is more of a carnal urge and something she is probably used to with her brother and father. He succumbs at first but ultimately denies her, making her upset. He goes on to tell her that others will come and try to change her way of life. She flees in anger, riding the family horse back to their mansion.

Once there, she encounters her brother about to dismember and burn their father's body. She informs him about what she has learned in the village and urges him not to do anything to their father's corpse. Her brother then goes through the house and arranges mannequins to appear as if they have fortified the household. She believes her brother is going mad and moves to an area of the property she calls "the vault," somewhere her brother is afraid to go. She brings a book of spells which she continuously writes in.

Her brother begins building a shooting post from two letters on the property and dons himself king with a dead raccoon cap. She remains in the vault chronicling her thoughts. A figure emerges from the forest on a machine they have never seen before. It's the mine inspector who the main character now believes is her prince. He finds her in the vault, making a horrific discovery. He has looked at the baptismal records and sees that there are supposed to be twin sisters on this property.

The mine inspector ventures into the vault and sees a humanoid figure bandaged from head to toe, still alive and another figure, a skeleton, hidden behind a glass case. The narrator explains that she believes they have been there forever and her father used to attend to them and spend time with them but then stopped and she has been feeding and tending to them ever since. The living figure is referred to as the 'Fair Punishment'.

She makes it further obvious the Fair Punishment is her twin and the decomposed body in the glass case is her mother, although she does not understand it. When the twins were four years old, the Fair Punishment had a habit of playing with matches that resulted in a fire which killed their mother. The Fair Punishment survived but was severely burned, and the father believed being burned alive was her punishment for her misdeeds. The mine inspector then tells her he wants to take her to safety. He also points out that she is pregnant with her brother's child. They leave on his motorcycle. He is her prince and they are riding away on his steed. As they are riding into the pines, the inspector is shot in the back by the brother. He is killed instantly.

She returns to the vault as more villagers begin to appear at the property. As her brother surrenders, she packs up belongings and escapes into the pines. The book ends with her giving birth.

== Film adaptation ==
A film adaptation by Simon Lavoie, The Little Girl Who Was Too Fond of Matches, was released in 2017, and garnered seven nominations at the Canadian Screen Awards.
