= Les Rescapés =

- Genre: science fiction drama
- Written by: Frédéric Ouellet
- Directed by: Claude Desrosiers
- Starring: Roy Dupuis; Guylaine Tremblay; Maxim Gaudette; Ève Lemieux; Antoine L'Écuyer
- Composer: Michel Cusson
- Country of origin: Canada
- Original language: French
- No. of seasons: 2
- No. of episodes: 23

Production
- Producers: Joanne Forgues; Marc Poulin
- Production locations: Montreal, Quebec
- Cinematography: Martin Falardeau
- Running time: 45 minutes
- Production company: Productions Casablanca Avenue Productions

Original release
- Network: Radio-Canada
- Release: August 31, 2010 – April 4, 2012

Les Rescapés is a Canadian television drama series, which debuted on Télévision de Radio-Canada in the 2010-11 television season.

The series stars Roy Dupuis and Guylaine Tremblay as Gérald and Monique Boivin, the patriarch and matriarch of a family from 1960s-era Montreal who find themselves mysteriously transported into 2010. The cast also includes Maxim Gaudette, Ève Lemieux, Antoine L'Écuyer, Benoît Girard, Céline Bonnier, Robert Lalonde, François Létourneau and Yan England.
