= Sophie Dupuis =

Canadian film director and screenwriter

Sophie Dupuis is a Canadian film director and screenwriter from Val-d'Or, Quebec.

== Career ==
Dupuis began her career directing short films, including J'viendrais t'chercher, Si tu savais Rosalie, Félix et Malou, Faillir, and L'hiver et la violence.

Her feature film debut, Family First (Chien de garde), premiered in 2018 and was selected as Canada's submission for the Best Foreign Language Film at the 91st Academy Awards. The film was nominated for eight Prix Iris at the 20th Quebec Cinema Awards, including a Best Director nomination for Dupuis.

Her second feature film, Underground (Souterrain), was released in 2020 and was nominated for four Canadian Screen Awards.

Her third feature film and third collaboration with actor Théodore Pellerin, Solo, premiered at the 2023 Toronto International Film Festival, where it won the award for Best Canadian Film. The film was included in TIFF's top Canadian films of the year.

== Personal life ==
Dupuis speaks English and French. She studied at Concordia University and the Université du Québec à Montréal.

Following the release of Solo, Dupuis came out as queer.

== Filmography ==
Year	Title	Original Title	Notes
2018	Family First	Chien de garde	Canadian submission for Best Foreign Language Film at the 91st Academy Awards
2020	Underground	Souterrain	
2023	Solo		
