= Brigitte Poupart =

Canadian actress and filmmaker

- Occupations: Actress, Filmmaker

Brigitte Poupart is a Canadian actress and filmmaker. She is most noted for her performance in the film Ravenous (Les Affamés) and for directing the 2012 film Over My Dead Body.

== Early life ==
Poupart was accepted both to law school and the Conservatoire d'art dramatique de Montréal. Following her mother's advice, she attended the Conservatoire until 1990.

== Career ==
She has also appeared in the television series Les Masques, Catherine, François en série, Musée Eden and Mémoires vives, and the films Congorama, Monsieur Lazhar, Tuktuq, Fake Tattoos, Les Salopes, or the Naturally Wanton Pleasure of Skin, Before We Explode (Avant qu'on explose), Bootlegger and Turtles (Les Tortues).

She directed the 2012 documentary film Over My Dead Body, which was shortlisted for the Canadian Screen Award for Best Feature Length Documentary at the 1st Canadian Screen Awards in 2012.

In 2016 she directed the show Luzia by Cirque du Soleil. She was the first Canadian woman to direct a Cirque du Soleil show.

Poupart appeared in the film Ravenous (Les Affamés), for which she was nominated for Best Supporting Actress at the 6th Canadian Screen Awards in 2018. She was also awarded meilleure interprétation féminine dans un rôle de soutien (best supporting actress) at the 2018 Gala Québec Cinéma,

In 2018, she appeared in the movie Les salopes ou le sucre naturel de la peau. She was nominated but ultimately lost the Canadian Screen Award for actress in a leading role for her work on the film. The same year, she was honoured by Association Femmes Monde à Paris and the Académie des lettres du Québec for her career.

In 2022, she directed Jusqu’à ce qu’on meure for her company Transthéâtre in Montreal.

In 2025, both her narrative fiction film Where Souls Go (Où vont les âmes?) and her documentary film À travers tes yeux premiered at the Cinemania film festival.
