= Gaétan Soucy =

Canadian novelist and professor (1958–2013)

- Born: 21 October 1958; Montreal, Quebec, Canada
- Died: 9 July 2013 (aged 54); Montreal, Quebec, Canada
- Education: Université de Montréal; McGill University
- Occupations: Novelist; professor
- Writing career
- Notable awards: Prix Ringuet (1999)

Gaétan Soucy (21 October 1958 – 9 July 2013) was a Canadian novelist and professor.

== Life ==
Gaétan Soucy was born in Montreal, Quebec. Upon completing his compulsory education, he went on to study physics at Université de Montréal, completed a master's degree in philosophy, and studied Japanese language and Japanese literature at McGill University.

Soucy wrote four novels. His first two novels, L'Immaculée conception, published in 1994 (with an English translation, The Immaculate Conception, by Lazer Lederhendler, published in 2005), and L'Acquittement, published in 1997 (with an English translation, Atonement, by Sheila Fischman, published in 1999) are extraordinary, dark and baroque works. Soucy's third novel, published in 1998, La petite fille qui aimait trop les allumettes (with an English translation, The Little Girl Who Was Too Fond of Matches, by Sheila Fischman, published in 2000) was a literary sensation in Quebec, leading it to be immediately translated into more than ten languages. Soucy's fourth novel, Music-Hall!, was published in 2002 (with an English translation, Vaudeville!, by Sheila Fischman, published in 2003).

La petite fille qui aimait trop les allumettes was chosen for inclusion in the French version of Canada Reads, which broadcast on Radio-Canada in 2004, where it was defended by actor, film director, screenwriter, and musician Micheline Lanctôt.

Gaétan Soucy died on 9 July 2013, in Montreal, of a heart attack.

== Bibliography ==
- L'Immaculée Conception (1994; published in France in 1998 as 8 décembre). The Immaculate Conception, trans. Lazer Lederhendler (2005)
- L'Acquittement (1997). Atonement, trans. Sheila Fischman (1999)
- La Petite Fille qui aimait trop les allumettes (1998). The Little Girl Who Was Too Fond of Matches, trans. Sheila Fischman (2000)
- Music-Hall ! (2002). Vaudeville!, trans. Sheila Fischman (2003)

== Awards and honours ==
- 1998: Grand prix du livre de Montréal, for L'Acquittement
- 1999: Prix Ringuet, for La Petite Fille qui aimait trop les allumettes
- 1999: Prix du grand public du Salon du livre de Montréal - La Presse, for La Petite Fille qui aimait trop les allumettes
- 1999: Nominated for the Prix Renaudot, for La Petite Fille qui aimait trop les allumettes
- 2003: Prix des libraires du Québec, for Music-Hall !
- 2003: Prix Jean-Hamelin (prix France-Québec), for Music-Hall !
- 2003: Prix Nessim-Habif, Académie royale de langue et de littérature françaises de Belgique, for his body of work
- 2004: Médaille de l'Assemblée nationale
- 2006: Shortlisted for the Giller Prize, for The Immaculate Conception
