= Carlo Guillermo Proto =

Canadian film director

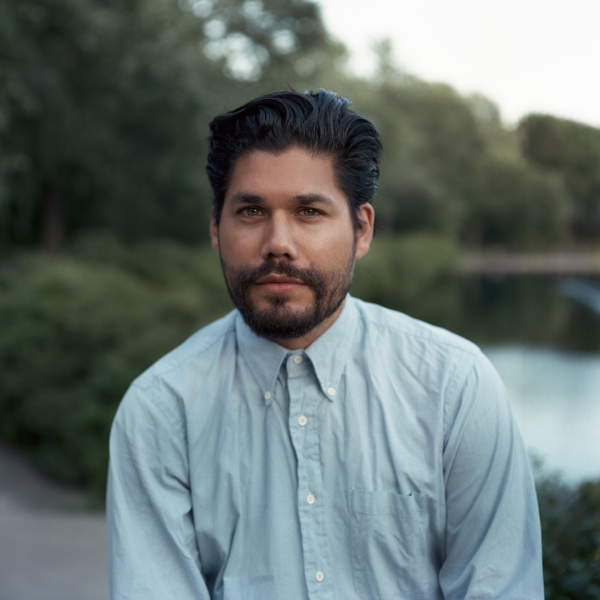
- Born: September 22, 1979 (age 46); Toronto, Ontario, Canada
- Education: Mel Hoppenheim School of Cinema
- Occupation: Film director
- Years active: 2005–present

Carlo Guillermo Proto is a Chilean-Canadian director who was raised in both Quillota, Chile and Mississauga, Ontario. His work focuses on the unique interplay between identity and human experience in relation to issues of geography, ethnicity, and perceived disabilities.

== Early life ==
Between the ages of 18 and 25, Carlo Guillermo Proto was heavily involved in the Toronto theater community. As the general manager and company producer for Toronto's Cahoots Theatre Projects, Mr. Proto produced several plays across Canada. During his time with the company, he created The Cahoots Summer Youth Project, a subsidized summer camp for low-income families. The director's influences include many playwrights and directors who were based out of Toronto, including John Mighton, Dan MacIvor, Daniel Brooks, and Guillermo Verdecchia. After winning the "Best Emerging Local Filmmaker" award for his first short film Pura Sangre in 2005 at the Alucine festival in Toronto, Proto moved to Montreal in order to attend Mel Hoppenheim school of cinema.

== Film career ==
In 2005, Proto founded the production company The Handshake Productions, which operates out of Montreal, Quebec. The company is interested in developing and creating documentary and fiction films with a focus on identity and socio-political issues. In 2013, Proto was selected to be a member of the jury of three for the Quebec City Film Festival. Proto's first short film, Pura Sangre (2005) is based on a South American travelogue and explores society's preoccupation with sociological and biological bloodlines. Proto's next short film, Peggy, Denis, and Lauviah (2007) attempts to reconstruct the perception of cinema by giving a super 8 camera to a blind family of three. El Huaso (2012), Proto's first feature-length documentary film chronicles Gustavo Proto, the director's father, as he struggles with short term memory loss. Gustavo has retired from his business and seeks solace in his homeland of Chile by pursuing his childhood dream by competing as a "huaso" in rodeos. Gustavo awaits the results of medical tests which will determine whether he has Alzheimer's. As he has long professed he would end his life is it became unbearable, he begins making preparations for his death while his family struggles to accept his decision to end his life. The film explores the pivotal point in one man's life where he takes it upon himself to shape his own mortality. Film critic, professor and former head of Mexico's National Cinémathèque, Gerardo Salcedo Romero, named El Huaso one of the best Latin American documentaries of 2012.

== Filmography ==
=== Features ===
| Year | Title | Director | Producer | Writer | Actor | Role | Notes |
|---|---|---|---|---|---|---|---|
| 2012 | El Huaso | Yes | Yes | Yes | Yes | Himself | Documentary. Co-written with Gustavo Guillermo Proto. Story Editor Guillermo Verecchia. Co-producers Serego Kirby and Arianne Schaffer |
| 2017 | Resurrecting Hassan | Yes | Yes | Yes | | | |

=== Shorts ===
| Year | Title | Director | Producer | Writer | Actor | Role | Notes |
|---|---|---|---|---|---|---|---|
| 2005 | Pura Sangre | Yes | Yes | Yes | | | Documentary |
| 2007 | Peggy, Denis, Lauviah | Yes | Yes | Yes | | | Documentary |

== Awards and nominations ==
| Year | Award | Category | Film | Result |
|---|---|---|---|---|
| 2005 | Toronto Alucine Film Festival Award | Best Emerging Local Filmmaker | Pura Sangre | Won |
| 2011 | Recontres Internationales du Documentaire de Montreal Award | Best Documentary | El Huaso | Nominated |
| 2012 | Quebec City Film Festival Award | Best Feature Film | El Huaso | Won |
| 2012 | Quebec City Film Festival Award | Audience Award for Best Canadian-Quebecois Film | El Huaso | Won |
| 2012 | DocsBarcelona Award | Best International Documentary | El Huaso | Nominated |
| 2012 | Rendes-Vous du Cinema Quebecois Award | Best Quebec Documentary | El Huaso | Nominated |
| 2012 | Hot Docs International Film Festival Award | Best Canadian Documentary | El Huaso | Nominated |
| 2012 | Lima International Film Festival Award | Best Latin American Documentary | El Huaso | Nominated |
| 2012 | Monterrey International Film Festival Award | Best International Documentary | El Huaso | Nominated |
| 2012 | Santiago International Film Festival Award | Best Chilean Film | El Huaso | Nominated |
| 2012 | Hamptons International Film Festival Award | Golden Starfish Award (Documentary Feature) | El Huaso | Nominated |
| 2012 | Guangzhou International Documentary Film Festival Award | Grand Jury Prize Best Documentary Feature | El Huaso | Nominated |
| 2012 | Guangzhou International Documentary Film Festival Award | Best Documentary Director | El Huaso | Nominated |
| 2012 | Guangzhou International Documentary Film Festival Award | Best Documentary Cinematography | El Huaso | Nominated |
| 2012 | Guangzhou International Documentary Film Festival Award | Best Documentary Film Editing | El Huaso | Nominated |
| 2012 | Guangzhou International Documentary Film Festival Award | Best Documentary Sound | El Huaso | Nominated |
| 2012 | Guadalajara International Film Festival Award | Best Latin American Documentary | El Huaso | Nominated |
| 2012 | Cleveland International Film Festival Award | Best Documentary - Audience Award | El Huaso | Nominated |
| 2013 | Cinema Tropical Award | Best Documentary | El Huaso | Nominated |
