= Robin Aubert =

Canadian actor, screenwriter and film director

- Born: May 3, 1972 (age 54); Canada
- Occupations: Actor, screenwriter, film director

Robin Aubert (born May 13, 1972) is a Canadian actor, screenwriter and film director. He is most noted for his performance in the film The Countess of Baton Rouge (La Comtesse de Bâton Rouge), for which he received a Genie Award nomination for Best Actor at the 18th Genie Awards in 1997, and his 2017 film Ravenous (Les Affamés), which won the Toronto International Film Festival Award for Best Canadian Film at the 2017 Toronto International Film Festival.

Aubert was born in Ham-Nord, Quebec. He is a founding member of the sketch comedy troupe Les Chick'n Swell in 1990, he began acting in stage roles including productions of Jean-Marc Dalpé's Eddy and Daniel Danis's Le Pont de pierres et la peau d'images. Around the same time, he appeared in the television series 4 et demi and Radio Enfer and the films The Escort (L'Escorte) and The Countess of Baton Rouge. His subsequent acting roles included the films Maelström, The Negro (Le nèg'), Mammouth, Father and Guns (De père en flic), Miraculum, The Masters of Suspense (Les Maîtres du suspense), Amsterdam, The Handout (Autrui), My Internship in Canada (Guibord s'en va-t-en guerre), A Way of Life (Une manière de vivre), My Very Own Circus (Mon cirque à moi) and François.e, and the television series Temps dur, Les Invincibles and Le Gentleman. He received a Prix Jutra nomination for Best Supporting Actor at the 17th Jutra Awards in 2015 for Miraculum.

As a filmmaker, he released a number of short films beginning in 1999, receiving a Jutra nomination for Best Short Film at the 3rd Jutra Awards in 2001 for Lila, before his feature-length debut Saint Martyrs of the Damned (Saints-Martyrs-des-Damnés) was released in 2005. He followed up with Train to Nowhere (À quelle heure le train pour nulle part) in 2009, Crying Out (À l'origine d'un cri) in 2010, Tuktuq in 2016 and Ravenous in 2017.

In 2023 he released You'll Never Know (Tu ne sauras jamais).
