= Sophie Lefebvre =

Canadian costume designer

Sophie Lefebvre is a Canadian costume designer, most noted as a two-time Jutra/Iris winner for Best Costume Design.

== Filmography ==
- Whoever Dies, Dies in Pain (Quiconque meurt, meurt à douleur) - 1998
- Post Mortem - 1999
- Les Siamoises - 1999
- The Left-Hand Side of the Fridge (La moitié gauche du frigo) - 2000
- The Bottle (La Bouteille) - 2000
- Games of the Heart (Du pic au cœur) - 2001
- The Woman Who Drinks (La Femme qui boit) - 2001
- The Negro (Le nèg') - 2002
- Marie's Sons (Les Fils de Marie) - 2002
- Gaz Bar Blues - 2003
- 8:17 p.m. Darling Street (20h17 rue Darling) - 2003
- Happy Camper (Camping sauvage) - 2004
- Looking for Alexander (Mémoires affectives) - 2004
- The Novena (La Neuvaine) - 2005
- May God Bless America (Que Dieu bénisse l'Amérique) - 2006
- Deliver Me (Délivrez-moi) - 2006
- Congorama - 2006
- Summit Circle (Contre tout espérance) - 2007
- Continental, a Film Without Guns (Continental, un film sans fusil) - 2007
- Romaine 30° Below (Romaine par moins 30) - 2009
- The Legacy (La Donation) - 2009
- The Timekeeper (L'Heure de vérité) - 2009
- Incendies - 2010
- Another Silence - 2011
- Coteau rouge - 2011
- Familiar Grounds (En terrains connus) - 2011
- The Salesman (Le Vendeur) - 2011
- Inch'Allah - 2012
- All That You Possess (Tout ce que tu possèdes) - 2012
- The Dismantling (Le Démantèlement) - 2013
- Gabrielle - 2013
- The Four Soldiers (Les Quatre Soldats) - 2013
- Une courte histoire de la folie - 2014
- Every Thing Will Be Fine - 2015
- Bad Seeds (Les Mauvaises herbes) - 2016
- Ovoïde - 2017
- The Fall of the American Empire (La Chute de l'empire américain) - 2018
- The Lodge - 2019
- Best Sellers - 2021
- Viking - 2022
- A Respectable Woman (Une femme respectable) - 2023
- Tell Me Why These Things Are So Beautiful (Dis-moi pourquoi ces choses sont si belles) - 2023

== Awards ==
Award	Year	Category	Work	Result	Ref(s)
Genie Awards	2002	Best Costume Design	The Woman Who Drinks (La Femme qui boit)	Nominated	
Genie Awards	2003	Best Costume Design	The Negro (Le nèg')	Nominated	
Canadian Screen Awards	2023	Best Costume Design	Viking	Nominated	
Jutra Awards	2004	Best Costume Design	Gaz Bar Blues	Nominated	
Jutra Awards	2010	Best Costume Design	The Timekeeper (L'Heure de vérité)	Nominated	
Jutra Awards	2011	Best Costume Design	Incendies	Won	
Jutra Awards	2012	Best Costume Design	Coteau rouge	Nominated	
Jutra Awards	2013	Best Costume Design	Inch'Allah	Nominated	
Prix Iris	2017	Best Costume Design	Bad Seeds (Les Mauvaises herbes)	Nominated	
Prix Iris	2023	Best Costume Design	Viking	Won	
Prix Iris	2023	Best Costume Design	A Respectable Woman (Une femme respectable)	Nominated	
