= 11th Jutra Awards =

Canadian film award

The 11th Jutra Awards were held on March 29, 2009, to honour films made with the participation of the Quebec film industry in 2008. Nominations were announced on February 17.

Babine received the most nominations and wins of the ceremony, with five awards from nine nominations. However, it was not nominated for Best Film, beating the record set by The Last Tunnel (Le dernier tunnel) at the 7th Jutra Awards.

Mommy Is at the Hairdresser's (Maman est chez le coiffeur) received eight nominations and won two awards, including Most Successful Film Outside Quebec which became a competitive award for the first time, having previously been given as a special award.

Borderline won four awards from six nominations, including Best Supporting Actress for Angèle Coutu and Best Director for Lyne Charlebois who became the first woman to win the award. Isabelle Blais won Best Actress, her second acting award after winning Best Supporting Actress for Québec-Montréal.

The Necessities of Life (Ce qu'il faut pour vivre) won three awards from seven nominations, including Best Film, Best Screenplay and Best Actor for Natar Ungalaaq who became the first indigenous actor to win at the Jutra Awards.

== Winners and nominees ==
Best Film	Best Director
The Necessities of Life (Ce qu'il faut pour vivre) — Bernadette Payeur, René Chénier; Borderline — Roger Frappier, Luc Vandal; It's Not Me, I Swear! (C'est pas moi, je le jure!) — Luc Déry, Kim McCraw; Mommy Is at the Hairdresser's (Maman est chez le coiffeur) — Lyse Lafontaine, Michael Mosca	Lyne Charlebois, Borderline; Yves Christian Fournier, Everything Is Fine (Tout est parfait); Robert Morin, Daddy Goes Ptarmigan Hunting (Papa à la chasse aux lagopèdes); Benoît Pilon, The Necessities of Life (Ce qu'il faut pour vivre)
Best Actor	Best Actress
Natar Ungalaaq, The Necessities of Life (Ce qu'il faut pour vivre); Michel Côté, Cruising Bar 2; Alexis Martin, Le Banquet; Vincent-Guillaume Otis, Babine	Isabelle Blais, Borderline; Suzanne Clément, It's Not Me, I Swear! (C'est pas moi, je le jure!); Susan Sarandon, Emotional Arithmetic; Guylaine Tremblay, Honey, I'm in Love (Le grand départ)
Best Supporting Actor	Best Supporting Actress
Normand D'Amour, Everything Is Fine (Tout est parfait); Gabriel Arcand, Mommy Is at the Hairdresser's (Maman est chez le coiffeur); Daniel Brière, It's Not Me, I Swear! (C'est pas moi, je le jure !); Luc Picard, Babine	Angèle Coutu, Borderline; Céline Bonnier, Mommy Is at the Hairdresser's (Maman est chez le coiffeur); Danielle Proulx, The Deserter (Le Déserteur); Maxim Roy, Adam's Wall
Best Screenplay	Best Documentary
Bernard Émond and Benoît Pilon, The Necessities of Life (Ce qu'il faut pour vivre); Philippe Falardeau, It's Not Me, I Swear! (C'est pas moi, je le jure !); Fred Pellerin, Babine; Guillaume Vigneault, Everything Is Fine (Tout est parfait)	Under the Hood: A Voyage Into the World of Torture (Sous la cagoule, un voyage au bout de la torture) — Patricio Henríquez; The Memories of Angels (La Mémoire des anges) — Luc Bourdon; My Father's Studio (L'atelier de mon père) — Jennifer Alleyn; The Other Side of the Country (De l'autre côté du pays) — Catherine Hébert
Best Live Short	Best Animated Short
Next Floor — Denis Villeneuve; Beyond the Walls (La battue) — Guy Édoin; My Name Is Victor Gazon (Mon nom est Victor Gazon) — Patrick Gazé; Les Réfugies — Émile Proulx-Cloutier	The Necktie (Le nœud cravate) - Jean-François Lévesque; Drux Flux — Theodore Ushev; Garbage Angels (Les anges déchets) — Pierre M. Trudeau; Rosa Rosa — Félix Dufour-Laperrière
Best Art Direction	Best Cinematography
Nicolas Lepage, Babine; Jean-François Campeau, It's Not Me, I Swear! (C'est pas moi, je le jure !); Danielle Labrie, The American Trap (Le piège américain); Michel Marsolais, Dans une galaxie près de chez vous 2	André Turpin, It's Not Me, I Swear! (C'est pas moi, je le jure !); Daniel Jobin, Mommy Is at the Hairdresser's (Maman est chez le coiffeur); Robert Morin, Daddy Goes Ptarmigan Hunting (Papa à la chasse aux lagopèdes); Ronald Plante, The Broken Line (La ligne brisée)
Best Costume Design	Best Editing
Carmen Alie, Babine; Michèle Hamel, Mommy Is at the Hairdresser's (Maman est chez le coiffeur); Michèle Hamel, The American Trap (Le piège américain); Ginette Magny, Le Banquet	Yvann Thibaudeau, Borderline; Glenn Berman, A No-Hit No-Run Summer (Un été sans point ni coup sûr); Carina Baccanale and Dominique Fortin, Le Banquet; Isabelle Malenfant, A Sentimental Capitalism (Un capitalisme sentimental)
Best Hair	Best Makeup
Martin Lapointe, Mommy Is at the Hairdresser's (Maman est chez le coiffeur); Réjean Goderre, Cruising Bar 2; Manon Joly, It's Not Me, I Swear! (C'est pas moi, je le jure!); Denis Parent, Babine	Kathryn Casault, Babine; Claudette Beaudoin-Casavant, The Deserter (Le Déserteur); Marie-Angèle Breitner, Borderline; C.J. Goldman, The Descendant
Best Original Music	Best Sound
Normand Corbeil and Serge Fiori, Babine; Carl Bastien and Luc Sicard, A No-Hit No-Run Summer (Un été sans point ni coup sûr); Laurent Eyquem, Mommy Is at the Hairdresser's (Maman est chez le coiffeur); Robert Marcel Lepage, The Necessities of Life (Ce qu'il faut pour vivre)	Dominique Chartrand, Olivier Calvert, Louis Gignac and Gavin Fernandes, Babine; Patrick Rousseau, Marie-Claude Gagne and Louis Gignac, Honey, I'm in Love (Le grand départ); Michel Lecoufle, Olivier Calvert and Stéphane Bergeron, Everything Is Fine (Tout est parfait); Tod Vandyk, Peter Lopata and Jean-Philippe Espantoso, Who Is KK Downey?
Most Successful Film Outside Quebec	Special Awards
Mommy Is at the Hairdresser's (Maman est chez le coiffeur); Continental, a Film Without Guns (Continental, un film sans fusil); Everything Is Fine (Tout est parfait); The Necessities of Life (Ce qu'il faut pour vivre); The 3 L'il Pigs (Les 3 p'tits cochons)	Jutra Hommage: Fernand Dansereau; Billet d'or: Cruising Bar 2

== Multiple wins and nominations ==
=== Films with multiple nominations ===
Nominations	Film
9	Babine
8	Mommy Is at the Hairdresser's (Maman est chez le coiffeur)
7	It's Not Me, I Swear! (C'est pas moi, je le jure!)
6	Borderline
6	The Necessities of Life (Ce qu'il faut pour vivre)
5	Everything Is Fine (Tout est parfait)
3	Le Banquet
2	The American Trap (Le piège américain)
2	Cruising Bar 2
2	Daddy Goes Ptarmigan Hunting (Papa à la chasse aux lagopèdes)
2	The Deserter (Le Déserteur)
2	Honey, I'm in Love (Le grand départ)
2	A No-Hit No-Run Summer (Un été sans point ni coup sûr)

=== Films with multiple wins ===
Wins	Film
5	Babine
4	Borderline
3	The Necessities of Life (Ce qu'il faut pour vivre)
2	Mommy Is at the Hairdresser's (Maman est chez le coiffeur)
