= A Place to Live (2018 film) =

- Film poster
- French: Pour vivre ici
- Directed by: Bernard Émond
- Written by: Bernard Émond
- Produced by: Bernadette Payeur
- Starring: Élise Guilbault; Sophie Desmarais; Danny Gilmore
- Cinematography: Jean-Pierre St-Louis
- Edited by: Annie Jean
- Production company: ACPAV
- Release date: February 21, 2018
- Running time: 90 minutes
- Country: Canada
- Language: French

A Place to Live (French: Pour vivre ici) is a Canadian drama film, directed by Bernard Émond and released in 2018. The film stars Élise Guilbault as Monique, a recently widowed woman who, while visiting her adult children in Montreal, decides to return to her childhood hometown of Verner, Ontario for the first time in many years.

In addition to Montreal and Verner, parts of the film were shot in Baie-Comeau, Tadoussac and Sudbury.

The film was Guilbault's fourth time appearing in Émond's films, following The Woman Who Drinks (La Femme qui boit), The Novena (La Neuvaine) and The Legacy (La Donation). Guilbault received a Prix Iris nomination for Best Actress for her work in the film.
