= Prix Iris for Best Actress =

Annual Canadian film award

Québec Cinéma presents an annual award for Best Actress (French: Prix Iris de la meilleure interprétation dans un premier rôle féminin) to recognize the best in the Cinema of Quebec.

Until 2016, it was known as the Jutra Award for Best Actress in memory of influential Quebec film director Claude Jutra. Following the withdrawal of Jutra's name from the award, the 2016 award was presented under the name Québec Cinéma. The Prix Iris name was announced in October 2016.

Céline Bonnier received the most nominations in this category, five, and received two awards. Karine Vanasse became the first actress to win the award twice. Three non-Canadian actresses won the award in consecutive years: Lubna Azabal for Incendies, Vanessa Paradis for Café de Flore and Rachel Mwanza for War Witch (Rebelle), the latter becoming the first black actress to win the award. Ginette Reno is the only actress to receive two nominations for playing the same role in different films, namely It's Your Turn, Laura Cadieux (C't'à ton tour, Laura Cadieux) and Laura Cadieux II (Laura Cadieux...la suite).

Four actresses received nominations for Best Actress and Best Supporting Actress or Revelation of the Year in the same year:

- In 2005, Céline Bonnier was nominated for Best Actress for Machine Gun Molly (Monica la mitraille) and Best Supporting Actress for The Last Tunnel (Le dernier tunnel).
- In 2007, Bonnier achieved the same feat again, winning Best Actress for Deliver Me (Délivrez-moi) while receiving a nomination for Best Supporting Actress for A Sunday in Kigali (Un dimanche à Kigali).
- In 2017, Emmanuelle Lussier-Martinez was nominated for Best Actress for Those Who Make Revolution Halfway Only Dig Their Own Graves (Ceux qui font les révolutions à moitié n'ont fait que se creuser un tombeau) and Best Supporting Actress for Bad Seeds (Les mauvaises herbes).
- In 2022, Hélène Florent became the first person to win both awards during the same ceremony: Best Actress for Drunken Birds (Les oiseaux ivres) and Best Supporting Actress for Maria Chapdelaine.
- In 2024, Ariane Castellanos won both Best Actress and Revelation of the Year for Richelieu, becoming the first to win two awards for the same film.

== 1990s ==
Year	Actress	Film	Ref
1999; 1st Jutra Awards
1999; 1st Jutra Awards	Pascale Montpetit	Streetheart (Le cœur au poing)	
1999; 1st Jutra Awards	Sylvia Chang	The Red Violin (Le violon rouge)	
1999; 1st Jutra Awards	Charlotte Laurier	2 Seconds (2 secondes)	
1999; 1st Jutra Awards	Ginette Reno	It's Your Turn, Laura Cadieux (C't'à ton tour, Laura Cadieux)	

== 2000s ==
Year	Actress	Film	Ref
2000; 2nd Jutra Awards
2000; 2nd Jutra Awards	Karine Vanasse	Set Me Free (Emporte-moi)	
2000; 2nd Jutra Awards	Ginette Reno	Laura Cadieux II (Laura Cadieux...la suite)	
2000; 2nd Jutra Awards	Pierrette Robitaille	Laura Cadieux II (Laura Cadieux...la suite)	
2000; 2nd Jutra Awards	Guylaine Tremblay	Matroni and Me (Matroni et moi)	
2001; 3rd Jutra Awards
2001; 3rd Jutra Awards	Marie-Josée Croze	Maelström	
2001; 3rd Jutra Awards	Hélène Loiselle	The Bottle (La bouteille)	
2001; 3rd Jutra Awards	Fanny Mallette	The Orphan Muses (Les muses orphelines)	
2001; 3rd Jutra Awards	Louise Portal	Full Blast	
2002; 4th Jutra Awards
2002; 4th Jutra Awards	Élise Guilbault	The Woman Who Drinks (La femme qui boit)	
2002; 4th Jutra Awards	Fanny Mallette	A Girl at the Window (Une jeune fille à la fenêtre)	
2002; 4th Jutra Awards	Isabel Richer	The Pig's Law (La loi du cochon)	
2002; 4th Jutra Awards	Catherine Trudeau	Tar Angel (L'ange de goudron)	
2003; 5th Jutra Awards
2003; 5th Jutra Awards	Karine Vanasse	Séraphin: Heart of Stone (Séraphin: Un homme et son péché)	
2003; 5th Jutra Awards	Pascale Bussières	Chaos and Desire (La turbulence des fluides)	
2003; 5th Jutra Awards	Maude Guérin	The Collector (Le collectionneur)	
2003; 5th Jutra Awards	Marie-Chantal Perron	The Mysterious Miss C. (La mystérieuse Mademoiselle C.)	
2004; 6th Jutra Awards
2004; 6th Jutra Awards	Marie-Josée Croze	The Barbarian Invasions (Les invasions barbares)	
2004; 6th Jutra Awards	Sylvie Drapeau	Juniper Tree (Le piège d'Issoudun)	
2004; 6th Jutra Awards	Micheline Lanctôt	How My Mother Gave Birth to Me During Menopause (Comment ma mère accoucha de moi durant sa ménopause)	
2004; 6th Jutra Awards	Ginette Reno	Mambo Italiano	
2005; 7th Jutra Awards
2005; 7th Jutra Awards	Pascale Bussières	Bittersweet Memories (Ma vie en cinémascope)	
2005; 7th Jutra Awards	Isabelle Blais	Love and Magnets (Les aimants)	
2005; 7th Jutra Awards	Céline Bonnier	Machine Gun Molly (Monica la mitraille)	
2005; 7th Jutra Awards	Jacinthe Laguë	The Five of Us (Elles étaient cinq)	
2006; 8th Jutra Awards
2006; 8th Jutra Awards	Élise Guilbault	The Novena (La neuvaine)	
2006; 8th Jutra Awards	Hélène Bourgeois Leclerc	Aurore	
2006; 8th Jutra Awards	Suzanne Clément	Audition (L'audition)	
2006; 8th Jutra Awards	Julie Le Breton	The Rocket (Maurice Richard)	
2007; 9th Jutra Awards
2007; 9th Jutra Awards	Céline Bonnier	Deliver Me (Délivrez-moi)	
2007; 9th Jutra Awards	Fatou N'Diaye	A Sunday in Kigali (Un dimanche à Kigali)	
2007; 9th Jutra Awards	Danielle Proulx	Family History (Histoire de famille)	
2007; 9th Jutra Awards	Ginette Reno	A Family Secret (Le secret de ma mère)	
2008; 10th Jutra Awards
2008; 10th Jutra Awards	Guylaine Tremblay	Summit Circle (Contre toute espérance)	
2008; 10th Jutra Awards	Sylvie Léonard	Days of Darkness (L'âge des ténèbres)	
2008; 10th Jutra Awards	Isabel Richer	The 3 L'il Pigs (Les 3 p'tits cochons)	
2008; 10th Jutra Awards	Karine Vanasse	My Daughter, My Angel (Ma fille, mon ange)	
2009; 11th Jutra Awards
2009; 11th Jutra Awards	Isabelle Blais	Borderline	
2009; 11th Jutra Awards	Suzanne Clément	It's Not Me, I Swear! (C'est pas moi, je le jure!)	
2009; 11th Jutra Awards	Susan Sarandon	Emotional Arithmetic	
2009; 11th Jutra Awards	Guylaine Tremblay	Honey, I'm in Love (Le grand départ)	

== 2010s ==
Year	Actress	Film	Ref
2010; 12th Jutra Awards
2010; 12th Jutra Awards	Anne Dorval	I Killed My Mother (J'ai tué ma mère)	
2010; 12th Jutra Awards	Céline Bonnier	Je me souviens	
2010; 12th Jutra Awards	Marie-Thérèse Fortin	Heat Wave (Les grandes chaleurs)	
2010; 12th Jutra Awards	Isabelle Guérard	Detour (Détour)	
2010; 12th Jutra Awards	Élise Guilbault	The Legacy (La donation)	
2011; 13th Jutra Awards
2011; 13th Jutra Awards	Lubna Azabal	Incendies	
2011; 13th Jutra Awards	Suzanne Clément	Silence Lies (Tromper le silence)	
2011; 13th Jutra Awards	Mélissa Désormeaux-Poulin	Incendies	
2011; 13th Jutra Awards	Évelyne Rompré	Twice a Woman (Deux fois une femme)	
2011; 13th Jutra Awards	Guylaine Tremblay	Mourning for Anna (Trois temps après la mort d'Anna)	
2012; 14th Jutra Awards
2012; 14th Jutra Awards	Vanessa Paradis	Café de Flore	
2012; 14th Jutra Awards	Céline Bonnier	Coteau rouge	
2012; 14th Jutra Awards	Catherine De Léan	Nuit #1	
2012; 14th Jutra Awards	Julie Le Breton	A Life Begins (Une vie qui commence)	
2012; 14th Jutra Awards	Madeleine Péloquin	For the Love of God (Pour l'amour de Dieu)	
2013; 15th Jutra Awards
2013; 15th Jutra Awards	Rachel Mwanza	War Witch (Rebelle)	
2013; 15th Jutra Awards	Micheline Bernard	Small Blind (La mise à l'aveugle)	
2013; 15th Jutra Awards	Marilyn Castonguay	L'Affaire Dumont	
2013; 15th Jutra Awards	Suzanne Clément	Laurence Anyways	
2013; 15th Jutra Awards	Dominique Quesnel	The Torrent (Le torrent)	
2014; 16th Jutra Awards
2014; 16th Jutra Awards	Pierrette Robitaille	Vic and Flo Saw a Bear (Vic+Flo ont vu un ours)	
2014; 16th Jutra Awards	Chloé Bourgeois	Diego Star	
2014; 16th Jutra Awards	Line Castonguay	Triptych (Triptyque)	
2014; 16th Jutra Awards	Rose-Maïté Erkoreka	Louis Cyr (Louis Cyr: L'homme le plus fort du monde)	
2014; 16th Jutra Awards	Marie-Evelyne Lessard	Fair Sex (Les manèges humains)	
2015; 17th Jutra Awards
2015; 17th Jutra Awards	Anne Dorval	Mommy	
2015; 17th Jutra Awards	Julianne Côté	You're Sleeping Nicole (Tu dors Nicole)	
2015; 17th Jutra Awards	Laurence Leboeuf	The Little Queen (La petite reine)	
2015; 17th Jutra Awards	Joëlle Paré-Beaulieu	What Are We Doing Here? (Qu'est-ce qu'on fait ici ?)	
2015; 17th Jutra Awards	Lise Roy	Tom at the Farm (Tom à la ferme)	
2016; 18th Quebec Cinema Awards
2016; 18th Quebec Cinema Awards	Céline Bonnier	The Passion of Augustine (La passion d'Augustine)	
2016; 18th Quebec Cinema Awards	Laurence Leboeuf	Turbo Kid	
2016; 18th Quebec Cinema Awards	Fanny Mallette	Chorus	
2016; 18th Quebec Cinema Awards	Anna Mouglalis	Anna	
2016; 18th Quebec Cinema Awards	Hadas Yaron	Felix and Meira (Félix et Meira)	
2017; 19th Quebec Cinema Awards
2017; 19th Quebec Cinema Awards	Mylène Mackay	Nelly	
2017; 19th Quebec Cinema Awards	Karina Aktouf	Montreal, White City (Montréal la blanche)	
2017; 19th Quebec Cinema Awards	Nathalie Baye	It's Only the End of the World (Juste la fin du monde)	
2017; 19th Quebec Cinema Awards	Emmanuelle Lussier-Martinez	Those Who Make Revolution Halfway Only Dig Their Own Graves (Ceux qui font les révolutions à moitié n'ont fait que se creuser un tombeau)	
2017; 19th Quebec Cinema Awards	Tatiana Maslany	Two Lovers and a Bear	
2018; 20th Quebec Cinema Awards
2018; 20th Quebec Cinema Awards	Maude Guérin	Family First (Chien de garde)	
2018; 20th Quebec Cinema Awards	Charlotte Aubin	Isla Blanca	
2018; 20th Quebec Cinema Awards	Mélissa Désormeaux-Poulin	Threesome (Le trip à trois)	
2018; 20th Quebec Cinema Awards	Denise Filiatrault	It's the Heart That Dies Last (C'est le cœur qui meurt en dernier)	
2018; 20th Quebec Cinema Awards	Élise Guilbault	A Place to Live (Pour vivre ici)	
2019; 21st Quebec Cinema Awards
2019; 21st Quebec Cinema Awards	Debbie Lynch-White	La Bolduc	
2019; 21st Quebec Cinema Awards	Josée Deschênes	Ghost Town Anthology (Répertoire des villes disparues)	
2019; 21st Quebec Cinema Awards	Brigitte Poupart	Les Salopes, or the Naturally Wanton Pleasure of Skin (Les salopes ou le sucre naturel de la peau)	
2019; 21st Quebec Cinema Awards	Karelle Tremblay	The Fireflies Are Gone (La disparition des lucioles)	
2019; 21st Quebec Cinema Awards	Carla Turcotte	Sashinka	

== 2020s ==
Year	Actress	Film	Ref
2020; 22nd Quebec Cinema Awards
2020; 22nd Quebec Cinema Awards	Andrée Lachapelle	And the Birds Rained Down (Il pleuvait des oiseaux)	
2020; 22nd Quebec Cinema Awards	Anne-Élisabeth Bossé	A Brother's Love (La femme de mon frère)	
2020; 22nd Quebec Cinema Awards	Anne Dorval	14 Days, 12 Nights (14 jours 12 nuits)	
2020; 22nd Quebec Cinema Awards	Léane Labrèche-Dor	Laughter (Le rire)	
2020; 22nd Quebec Cinema Awards	Noémie O'Farrell	Fabulous (Fabuleuses)	
2021; 23rd Quebec Cinema Awards
2021; 23rd Quebec Cinema Awards	Émilie Bierre	Our Own (Les nôtres)	
2021; 23rd Quebec Cinema Awards	Marie-Evelyne Lessard	The Decline (Jusqu'au déclin)	
2021; 23rd Quebec Cinema Awards	Margaret Qualley	My Salinger Year	
2021; 23rd Quebec Cinema Awards	Sarah Sutherland	Like a House on Fire	
2021; 23rd Quebec Cinema Awards	Karelle Tremblay	Death of a Ladies' Man	
2022; 24th Quebec Cinema Awards
2022; 24th Quebec Cinema Awards	Hélène Florent	Drunken Birds (Les oiseaux ivres)	
2022; 24th Quebec Cinema Awards	Nour Belkhiria	A Revision (Une révision)	
2022; 24th Quebec Cinema Awards	Émilie Bierre	The Guide to the Perfect Family (Le guide de la famille parfaite)	
2022; 24th Quebec Cinema Awards	Pascale Bussières	Bootlegger	
2022; 24th Quebec Cinema Awards	Danielle Fichaud	Aline	
2023; 25th Quebec Cinema Awards
2023; 25th Quebec Cinema Awards	Kelly Depeault	Noemie Says Yes (Noémie dit oui)	
2023; 25th Quebec Cinema Awards	Larissa Corriveau	Viking	
2023; 25th Quebec Cinema Awards	Hélène Florent	A Respectable Woman (Une femme respectable)	
2023; 25th Quebec Cinema Awards	Léane Labrèche-Dor	My Mother's Men (Les hommes de ma mère)	
2023; 25th Quebec Cinema Awards	Sara Montpetit	Falcon Lake	
2024; 26th Quebec Cinema Awards
2024; 26th Quebec Cinema Awards	Ariane Castellanos	Richelieu	
2024; 26th Quebec Cinema Awards	Sophie Desmarais	Days of Happiness (Les Jours heureux)	
2024; 26th Quebec Cinema Awards	Magalie Lépine-Blondeau	The Nature of Love (Simple comme Sylvain)	
2024; 26th Quebec Cinema Awards	Mylène Mackay	Tell Me Why These Things Are So Beautiful (Dis-moi pourquoi ces choses sont si belles)	
2024; 26th Quebec Cinema Awards	Sara Montpetit	Humanist Vampire Seeking Consenting Suicidal Person (Vampire humaniste cherche suicidaire consentant)	
2024; 26th Quebec Cinema Awards	Nahéma Ricci	Hunting Daze (Jour de chasse)	
2025; 27th Quebec Cinema Awards
2025; 27th Quebec Cinema Awards	Karine Gonthier-Hyndman	Two Women (Deux femmes en or)	
2025; 27th Quebec Cinema Awards	Leïla Bekhti	Once Upon My Mother (Ma mère, Dieu et Sylvie Vartan)	
2025; 27th Quebec Cinema Awards	Anne-Élisabeth Bossé	Compulsive Liar 2 (Menteuse)	
2025; 27th Quebec Cinema Awards	Marguerite Laurence	Miss Boots (Mlle Bottine)	
2025; 27th Quebec Cinema Awards	Laurence Leboeuf	Two Women (Deux femmes en or)	

== Multiple wins and nominations ==
=== Multiple wins ===
Wins	Actress
2	Céline Bonnier
2	Marie-Josée Croze
2	Anne Dorval
2	Élise Guilbault
2	Karine Vanasse

=== Three or more nominations ===
Nominations	Actress
5	Céline Bonnier
4	Suzanne Clément
4	Élise Guilbault
4	Ginette Reno
4	Guylaine Tremblay
3	Pascale Bussières
3	Anne Dorval
3	Laurence Leboeuf
3	Fanny Mallette
3	Karine Vanasse

== Combined totals for Best Actress, Best Supporting Actress and Revelation of the Year ==
=== Multiple wins ===
Wins	Actress
3	Céline Bonnier
3	Sandrine Bisson
2	Émilie Bierre
2	Isabelle Blais
2	Pascale Bussières
2	Ariane Castellanos
2	Marie-Josée Croze
2	Kelly Depeault
2	Anne Dorval
2	Hélène Florent
2	Élise Guilbault
2	Karine Vanasse

=== Three or more nominations ===
Nominations	Actress
12	Céline Bonnier
6	Suzanne Clément
6	Guylaine Tremblay
5	Sandrine Bisson
5	Élise Guilbault
5	Fanny Mallette
4	Isabelle Blais
4	Pascale Bussières
4	Sophie Desmarais
4	Mélissa Désormeaux-Poulin
4	Anne Dorval
4	Maude Guérin
4	Micheline Lanctôt
4	Laurence Leboeuf
4	Danielle Proulx
4	Ginette Reno
4	Karine Vanasse
3	Émilie Bierre
3	Marie Brassard
3	Hélène Florent
3	Julie Le Breton
3	Sara Montpetit
3	Louise Portal
3	Pierrette Robitaille
3	Sonia Vachon

== See also ==
- Canadian Screen Award for Best Actress
