= Patrick Drolet =

Canadian film and television actor

Patrick Drolet is a Canadian film and television actor. His credits include the films Father and Guns (De père en flic), The Child Prodigy (L'Enfant prodige), All That You Possess (Tout ce que tu possèdes), Honey, I'm in Love (Le Grand départ), The Genius of Crime (Le Génie du crime) and The Novena (La neuvaine), and the television series Les Invincibles, Mémoires vives, Les Bougon: C'est aussi ça la vie, Trauma and Happily Married (C'est comme ça que je t'aime).

He was nominated for Best Supporting Actor at the 2010 Genie Awards for his performance in De père en flic, and for Best Actor at the 1st Canadian Screen Awards for his performance in Tout ce que tu possèdes.

== Filmography ==
=== Film ===
| Year | Title | Role | Notes |
|---|---|---|---|
| 2001 | Tar Angel (L'Ange de goudron) | Eric | |
| 2002 | Dangerous People (Les Dangereux) | Gal | |
| 2003 | 8:17 p.m. Darling Street (20h17 rue Darling) | Carl | |
| 2005 | The Novena (La Neuvaine) | François | |
| 2006 | The Genius of Crime (Le Génie du crime) | Stevie | |
| 2008 | Honey, I'm in Love (Le grand départ) | Guylain | |
| 2009 | A Happy Man (Le Bonheur de Pierre) | Steven Dolbec | |
| 2009 | Father and Guns (De père en flic) | Tim Bérubé | |
| 2010 | The Child Prodigy (L'Enfant prodige) | André Mathieu Adult | |
| 2010 | The Hair of the Beast (Le poil de la bête) | Duchesneau | |
| 2012 | All That You Possess (Tout ce que tu possèdes) | Pierre Leduc | |
| 2013 | Émilie | Mathieu | |
| 2015 | The Diary of an Old Man (Le Journal d’un vieil homme) | Michel Murray | |
| 2016 | Kiss Me Like a Lover (Embrasse-moi comme tu m'aimes) | Philippe Dupré | |
| 2017 | This Is Our Cup (Ça sent la coupe) | François | |
| 2018 | Pauvre Georges! | Rullin | |

=== Television ===
| Year | Title | Role | Notes |
|---|---|---|---|
| 2002 | Fortier | Sébastien Ouellet | 3 episodes |
| 2002 | Ayoye | Fléonard Bacon | Episode: "Chute de l'Empire" |
| 2004 | Les Bougon | Gardien | Episode: "D'la grand vésite" |
| 2004 | Rumeurs | Dr. Sébastien Valois-Charest | Episode: "Amour et biologie: Part 2" |
| 2005–2009 | Les Invincibles | Mère de Richard | 22 episodes |
| 2006 | Kif-Kif | Yan Choquette | Television series |
| 2008 | Collection Fred Vargas | Inspecteur Noël | Episode: "Sous les vents de Neptune" |
| 2011–2012 | Trauma | Me Charles Lemieux | 6 episodes |
| 2013 | 30 vies | Éric Lupien | Episode #4.41 |
| 2013–2015 | Mémoires vives | Nicolas Berthier | 48 episodes |
| 2018 | Ruptures | Denis Théberge | 2 episodes |
| 2018 | Victor Lessard | François Lachaine | 3 episodes |
| 2018 | Mensonges | Hugo Roy | 10 episodes |
| 2020 | Happily Married | Mario le Curé | 7 episodes |
| 2020–2021 | District 31 | Vincent Lemaire | 13 episodes |
| 2022 | La Faille | Émile Savard-Jolicoeur | 8 episodes |
