= Association coopérative de productions audio-visuelles =

The Association coopérative de productions audio-visuelles (ACPAV) is a Canadian film cooperative, which serves as a production company for films by emerging film directors from Quebec. Established in 1971 in Montreal, the organization has played a central role in the development of the Cinema of Quebec, by producing and releasing early-career films by many of the province's most prominent and successful filmmakers. Key producers associated with the cooperative have included Marc Daigle, Bernadette Payeur and René Gueissaz.

Québec Cinéma named the organization as the winner of its Prix Iris Tribute Award at the 22nd Quebec Cinema Awards in 2021, to honour its 50th anniversary. This marked the first time in the history of that category that it was presented to an organization rather than an individual.

== Selected filmography ==
Film	Director	Year
8:17 p.m. Darling Street (20h17 rue Darling)	Bernard Émond	2003
The Absence (L'Absence)	Brigitte Sauriol	1976
All That You Possess (Tout ce que tu possèdes)	Bernard Émond	2012
Antigone	Sophie Deraspe	2019
Caffè Italia, Montréal	Paul Tana	1985
Cap Tourmente	Michel Langlois	1993
Day by Day (Les grands enfants)	Paul Tana	1980
The Devil's Hole (Le Trou du diable)	Richard Lavoie	1989
The Diary of an Old Man (Le Journal d’un vieil homme)	Bernard Émond	2015
The Dismantling (Le Démantèlement)	Sébastien Pilote	2013
Dream Life (La vie rêvée)	Mireille Dansereau	1972
The Fabulous Voyage of the Angel (Le fabuleux voyage de l'ange)	Jean Pierre Lefebvre	1991
February 15, 1839 (15 février 1839)	Pierre Falardeau	2001
The Final Act (Le Dernier acte)	Sophie Deraspe	2026
The Fireflies Are Gone (La disparition des lucioles)	Sébastien Pilote	2018
Forest Alert (L'Erreur boréale)	Richard Desjardins, Robert Monderie	1999
The Heat Line (La ligne de chaleur)	Hubert-Yves Rose	1988
Iqaluit	Benoît Pilon	2018
The Legacy (La Donation)	Bernard Émond	2009
Little Tougas (Ti-Cul Tougas)	Jean-Guy Noël	1976
Lucien Brouillard	Bruno Carrière	1983
Mr. Aiello (La Déroute)	Paul Tana	1998
Montreal Main	Frank Vitale	1974
Mort subite d'un homme-théâtre	Jean-Claude Coulbois	2011
Mourning for Anna (Trois temps après la mort d'Anna)	Catherine Martin	2010
The Necessities of Life (Ce qu'il faut pour vivre)	Benoît Pilon	2015
The Night of the Visitor (La nuit du visiteur)	Laurent Gagliardi	1990
The Novena (La Neuvaine)	Bernard Émond	2005
Octobre	Pierre Falardeau	1994
A Pacemaker and a Sidecar (L'eau chaud, l'eau frette)	André Forcier	1976
The Party (Le Party)	Pierre Falardeau	1990
A Place to Live (Pour vivre ici)	Bernard Émond	2018
A Respectable Woman (Une femme respectable)	Bernard Émond	2023
Rêves de poussière	Laurent Salgues	2006
The Revolving Doors (Les portes tournantes)	Francis Mankiewicz	1988
The Salesman (Le Vendeur)	Sébastien Pilote	2011
The Saracen Woman (La Sarrasine)	Paul Tana	1992
So the Moon Rises (La lune viendra d'elle-même)	Marie-Jan Seille	2004
Summit Circle (Contre tout espérance)	Bernard Émond	2007
The Wolves (Les loups)	Sophie Deraspe	2014
A Woman in Transit (La Femme de l'hôtel)	Léa Pool	1984
The Woman Who Drinks (La Femme qui boit)	Bernard Émond	2000
You Are Warm, You Are Warm (Tu brûles... tu brûles...)	Jean-Guy Noël	1973
