= François Papineau =

Canadian actor (born 1966)

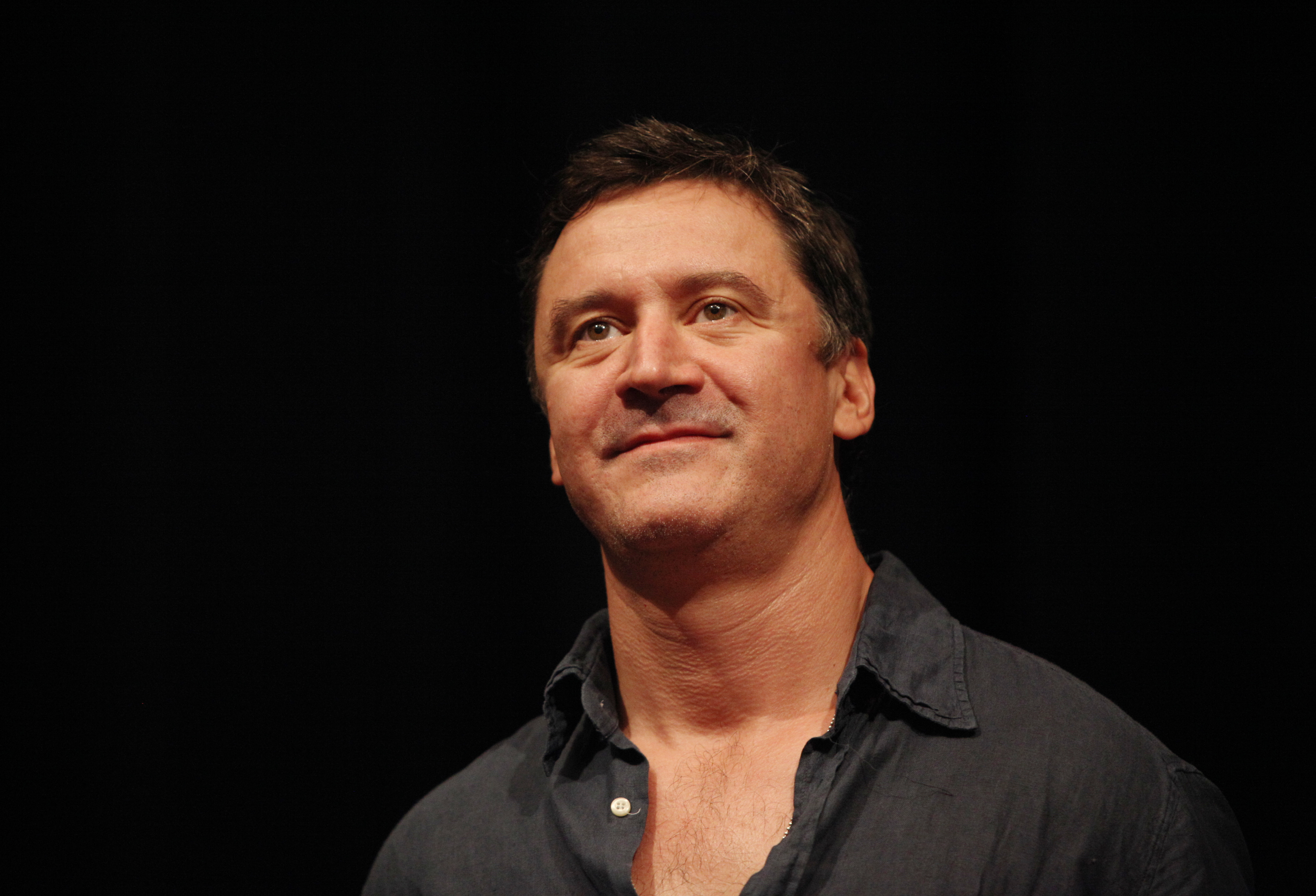
- François Papineau, 2010
- Born: 24 December 1966 (age 59); Montreal, Quebec
- Education: National Theatre School of Canada
- Occupation: Actor
- Spouse: Bénédicte Décary

François Papineau (born 24 December 1966) is a Canadian actor who worked in stage and the Cinema of Quebec for over 25 years.

Papineau graduated from the National Theatre School of Canada in 1990. He was nominated for the Genie Award for Best Actor for Route 132 (2010).

In 2015, he joined the cast of director Benoît Pilon's film Iqaluit, alongside Marie-Josée Croze and Natar Ungalaaq. Iqaluit was released in 2016, the same year as his Bad Seeds, and Wild Run: The Legend (Chasse-Galerie: La Légende), where Papineau played Jack Murphy, the Devil in the Chasse-galerie mythology. Papineau was tasked to play the villain as suave with a slight English accent.

He is married to actress Bénédicte Décary, with whom he costarred in the 2021 television series Entre deux draps.

== Selected filmography ==
- The Confessional (Le Confessionnal) - 1995
- Post Mortem - 1999
- Sable Island (L'Île de Sable) - 1999
- Tar Angel (L'Ange de goudron) - 2001
- The Collector (Le Collectionneur) - 2002
- The Genius of Crime (Le Génie du crime) - 2006
- Daddy Goes Ptarmigan Hunting (Papa à la chasse aux lagopèdes) - 2008
- Mourning for Anna (Trois temps après la mort d'Anna) - 2010
- Route 132 - 2010
- A Life Begins (Une vie qui commence) - 2010
- The Child Prodigy (L'Enfant prodige) - 2010
- Wetlands (Marécages) - 2011
- The Meteor (Le Météore) - 2013
- Iqaluit - 2016
- Wild Run: The Legend (Chasse-Galerie: La Légende) - 2016
- 9 (9, le film) - 2016
- Bad Seeds (Les Mauvaises herbes) - 2016
- The Fireflies Are Gone (La disparition des lucioles) - 2018
- 14 Days, 12 Nights (14 jours 12 nuits) - 2019
- The Vinland Club (Le Club Vinland) - 2020
- Entre deux draps - 2021
- La Contemplation du mystère - 2021
- You Are Not Alone (Vous n'êtes pas seul) - 2024
