= The Diary of an Old Man =

- French: Le Journal d’un vieil homme
- Directed by: Bernard Émond
- Written by: Bernard Émond
- Based on: Скучная история by Anton Chekhov
- Produced by: Bernadette Payeur
- Starring: Paul Savoie; Marie-Ève Pelletier
- Cinematography: Jean-Pierre St-Louis
- Edited by: Louise Côté
- Music by: Robert Marcel Lepage
- Production company: ACPAV
- Distributed by: Les Films Séville
- Release dates: February 7, 2015 (Berlin Critics' Week); August 21, 2015 (Quebec)
- Running time: 82 minutes
- Country: Canada
- Language: French

The Diary of an Old Man (French: Le Journal d’un vieil homme) is a 2015 drama film directed by Bernard Émond. It is based on the Anton Chekhov short story "A Dreary Story" (alternatively titled in English "A Boring Story" or "A Dull Story").

The film was shot at the Université de Montréal Faculty of Medicine and elsewhere in Greater Montreal over 27 days in February, April, and May 2014.

The film premiered at the inaugural Berlin Critics' Week (a series of screenings, organized by the German Film Critics Association, running parallel to the Berlin Film Festival).

The film received one Jutra nomination, for lead actor Paul Savoie. Savoie won the award for Best Performance in a Borsos Competition Film at the Whistler Film Festival.

== See also ==
- An Uneventful Story, Polish film based on the same short story
