= 8:17 p.m. Darling Street =

- French: 20h17 rue Darling
- Directed by: Bernard Émond
- Written by: Bernard Émond
- Produced by: Bernadette Payeur
- Starring: Luc Picard; Guylaine Tremblay; Diane Lavallée; Markita Boies; Micheline Bernard; Lise Castonguay; Vincent Bilodeau; Fanny Mallette
- Cinematography: Jean-Pierre St-Louis
- Edited by: Louise Côté
- Music by: Robert M. Lepage
- Production company: ACPAV
- Distributed by: Christal Films (Quebec)
- Release date: 2003
- Running time: 101 minutes
- Country: Canada
- Language: French

8:17 p.m. Darling Street (French: 20h17 rue Darling) is both a novel by the anthropologist Bernard Émond and also his second feature-length fiction film. It was released in 2003 and made three years after his debut feature, The Woman Who Drinks. It was screened at the 2003 Toronto International Film Festival.

== Synopsis ==
A former journalist (Luc Picard), three times divorced, is now a member of Alcoholics Anonymous and lives in a small apartment on Darling Street in Montreal. By chance he arrives home minutes after an explosion levels the building, causing the death of six people. Moved by survivor guilt, he finds his old journalist instincts kicking in and decides to research his dead neighbour's pasts to not only understand what occurred but also to give meaning to the terrible event and his wasted life. It was nominated for six Prix Jutra, including Best Screenplay and Best Director.

TIFF 2003 program guide wrote, "The charismatic Picard — one of the leading Québécois actors of his generation — gives a complex, uninhibited performance in perfect harmony with the clean camera work and tranquil, dignified tone of the hopeful conclusion." Variety wrote, "Bernard Émond examines how casual events can determine fate, and ponds big issues of forgiveness, mercy, faith, self-doubt, addiction and compassion."

== Awards ==
8:17 P.M. Darling Street was presented at the 2003 Cannes International Critics' Week and won the Audience Award for Best Canadian Feature at the Acadie International French-Language Film Festival and the Best Male Performance Award for Luc Picard at the Festival International du Film Francophone de Namur in Belgium.

== Publication ==
20H17. Rue Darling, Montreal, (Quebec), Canada, Lux Éditeur, 2005, 128 p. (ISBN 978-2-922494-96-9). English translation by John Gilmore, 8:17 pm, rue Darling, Toronto, (Ontario), Canada, Guernica Editions, 2014, 133 p. (ISBN 978-1-55071-846-1)
