= Iqaluit (film) =

- Directed by: Benoît Pilon
- Written by: Benoît Pilon
- Produced by: Robert Lacerte; Bernadette Payeur
- Starring: Marie-Josée Croze; François Papineau; Natar Ungalaaq
- Cinematography: Michel La Veaux
- Edited by: Richard Comeau
- Music by: Robert Marcel Lepage
- Production company: ACPAV
- Distributed by: Seville International
- Release dates: October 1, 2016 (Hamburg Film Festival); October 11, 2016 (Mill Valley Film Festival); March 10, 2017 (Canada)
- Running time: 102 minutes
- Country: Canada
- Languages: French; Inuktitut; English
- Budget: $4.5 million

Iqaluit is a 2016 Canadian drama film directed and written by Benoît Pilon and starring Marie-Josée Croze, François Papineau and Natar Ungalaaq. The film was shot in Iqaluit, Nunavut, which provided its title. It is about a Quebec woman (Croze) who travels to Northern Canada after her husband (Papineau) is seriously injured. She uncovers the secret relationships he had with the Inuit community, and becomes acquainted with an Inuk man (Ungalaaq) struggling with a related family crisis.

Pilon conceived of the story and planned the execution for years, though the travel and shooting conditions provided challenges. The film screened in a few film festivals before a general release. Iqaluit received some positive coverage in the Quebec press and favorable reactions from Nunavut viewers.

== Plot ==
Gilles is a French Canadian working in Nunavut while his wife, Carmen, lives in Montreal and leads a career in marketing. Word reaches Carmen that Gilles has suffered a head injury, and she travels north for the first time to see him. She has never been to the north to visit Gilles at work. At the hospital, she sees him die, and the authorities plan an autopsy since the cause of death is uncertain. Carmen meets with the RCMP and learns that they are not actively investigating Gilles' death. Although she was planning to leave Iqaluit with her husband's body she changes her mind and decides to stay. Carmen meets an Inuk man, Noah, who worked with Gilles and regarded him as a good friend. While packing her husband's belongings she finds that Gilles had accumulated a collection of carvings.

Carmen notices Noah's 20-year-old niece Ani, and his grown son Dany, and discovers Gilles had an affair with Ani. They had a son, Simigaq, though Carmen and Gilles never had any children. The affair ended after the birth of the child, with Gilles offering financial support and buying Noah's carvings to help the family. Carmen confides in Noah at the local bar, with Noah explaining he adopted Ani to rescue her from her abusive father. Carmen expresses her sorrow and anger at Gilles, after which Noah takes her to a remote fishing site. There, he sets up a tent and fishes, but admits he has little knowledge of Inuit hunting customs, as he was placed in a residential school as a boy. Noah's family arrive at the site in a state of panic, telling him Dany has abducted Ani and Simigaq, and gone into the wilderness, armed with a rifle. Wary of involving the RCMP, Noah believes he can reason with Dany, and Carmen insists on accompanying him.

When Noah and Carmen find Dany and Ani, Dany asserts he can live on the land and evade the authorities. Carmen asks him what he did to Gilles. Dany replies that Gilles' death was an accident, but the police would never believe him. As the situation begins to de-escalate, Carmen speaks to Ani, who witnessed Gilles' death. Dany was pressing Gilles for money before accusing him and other whites of coming to the Arctic and seducing local women, including Ani. The argument led to shoving, during which Gilles tripped and fell over a cliff. After the situation with Dany is defused, the group takes their two boats back to the mainland, with Carmen asking Ani if Simigaq will ever know about Gilles. Ani replies she and everyone in the community will tell Simigaq about Gilles.

== Cast ==
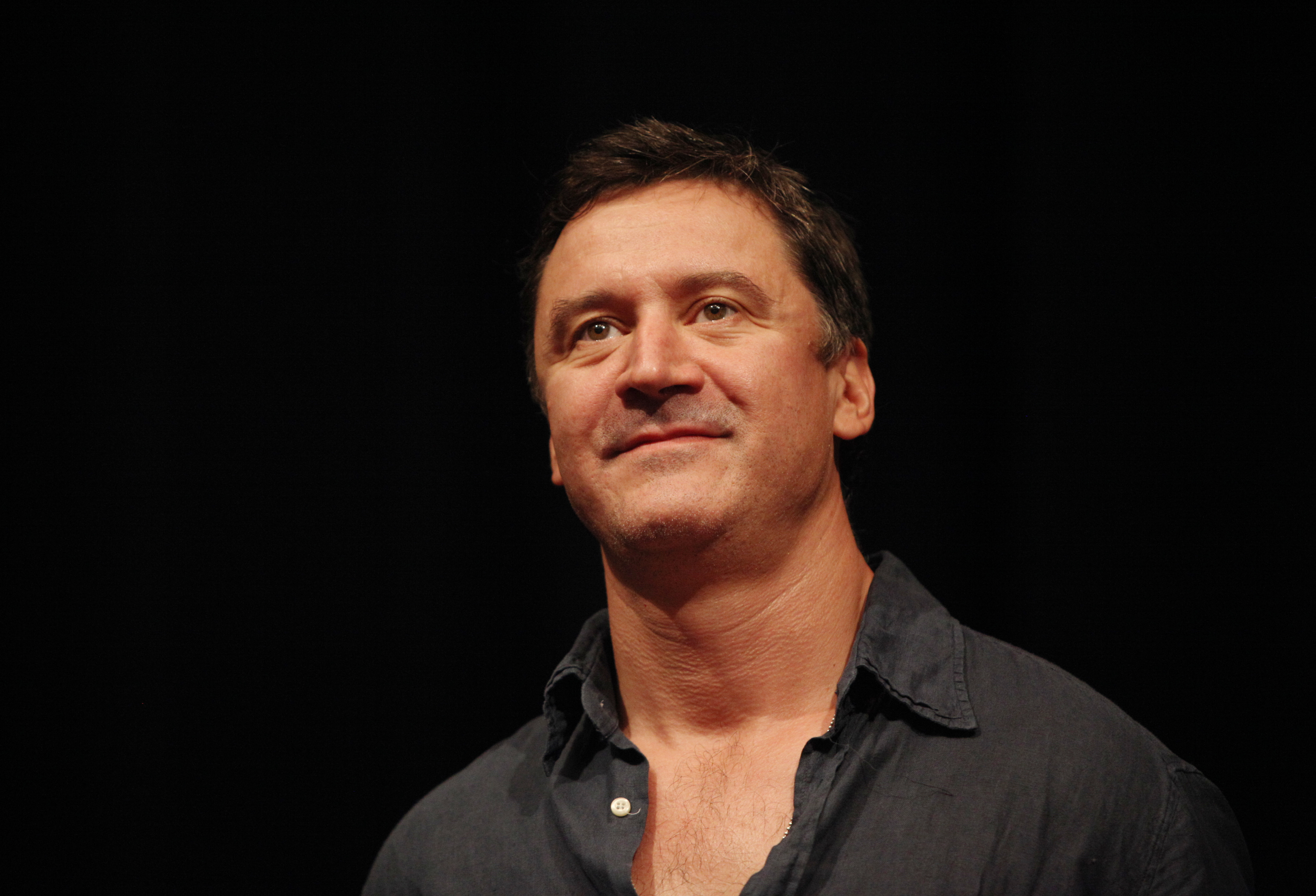
François Papineau appears as Gilles.

- Marie-Josée Croze as Carmen
- François Papineau as Gilles
- Natar Ungalaaq as Noah
- Sébastien Huberdeau as Victor
- Christine Tootoo as Ani
- Paul Nutarariaq as Dany

== Production ==
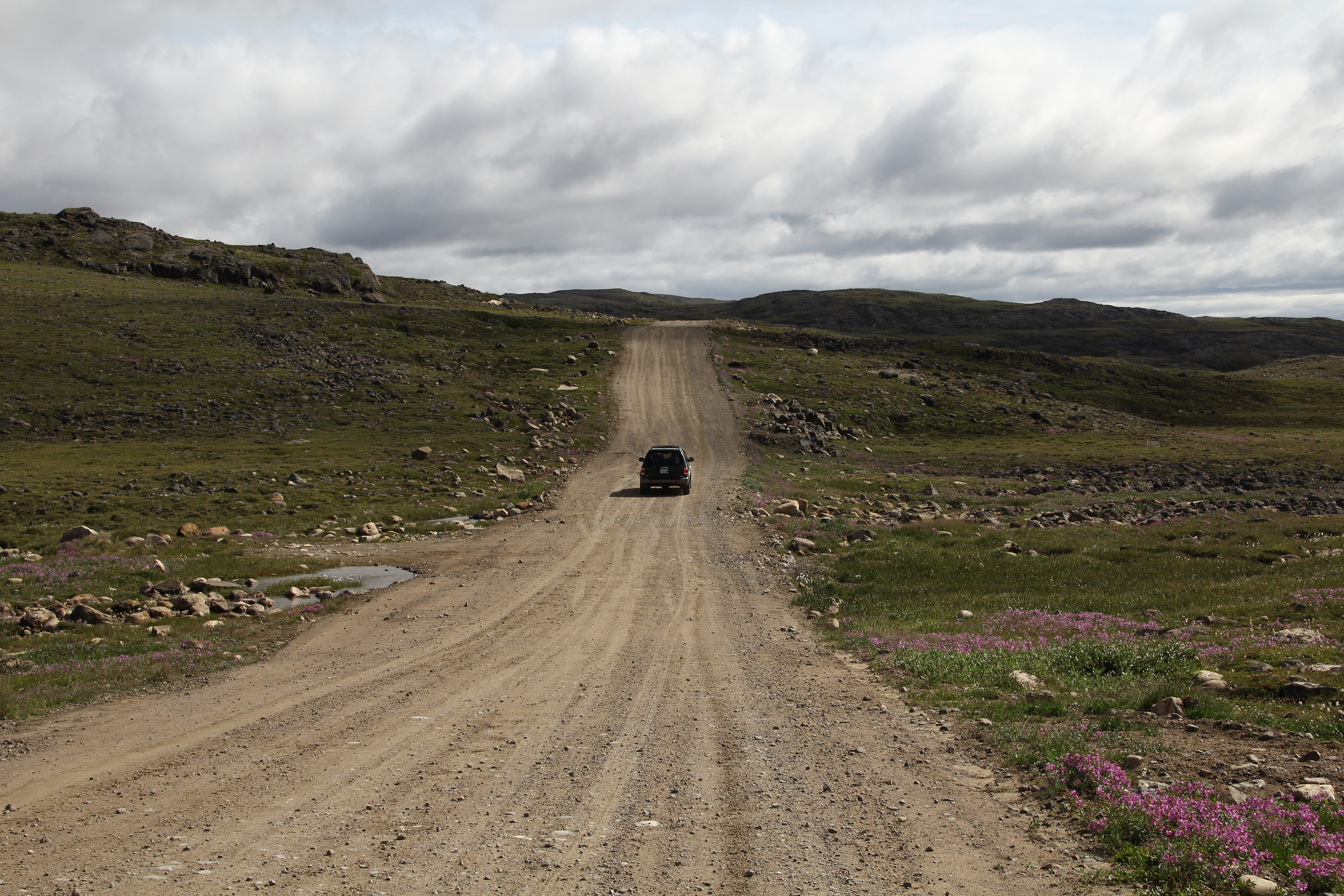
Iqaluit, Nunavut is a location for the film, which depicts its Road to Nowhere.

Director Benoît Pilon wrote the screenplay, claiming he had the story in mind for nine years. Pilon stated his 2008 film The Necessities of Life gave him the curiosity to learn more about and capture the town of Iqaluit. A budget of $4.5 million was assembled with help from Telefilm Canada and Bell Media.

Pilon announced the casting of Marie-Josée Croze in summer 2015, with the cast also featuring Inuk actor Natar Ungalaaq, whom Pilon had previously worked with on The Necessities of Life. Ungalaaq accepted the role, saying "the director ... really believed I could play that role and I accepted that as a fact". Christine Tootoo was a novice actress from Rankin Inlet.

Filming began in Iqaluit on 20 August 2015, with 30 crew members from Montreal and 20 Inuit crew members. Moving the 10 tons of film equipment posed great obstacles, travel and accommodation costs were anticipated to be high, and temperatures during production were expected to be volatile. Plans were to film in Northern Canada for 26 days and in Montreal for one day.

During production, Daniel Justice, leader of First Nations and Indigenous Studies in the University of British Columbia, complained about a Facebook post from Iqaluit resident and crew member Pascale Arpin, seeking fellow Iqaluit residents to eat a seal for the film. The concern was that this amounted to cultural exploitation.

== Release ==
At the start of filming, Entertainment One planned to distribute the film in Canada in 2016, with Seville International having international rights. The film opened in Quebec on 10 March 2017. In Nunavut, it debuted at Iqaluit's Astro Theatre on 19 April.

The film played in Filmfest Hamburg in October 2016. Iqaluit also competed for Best Film at the American Indian Film Festival in 2016.

== Reception ==
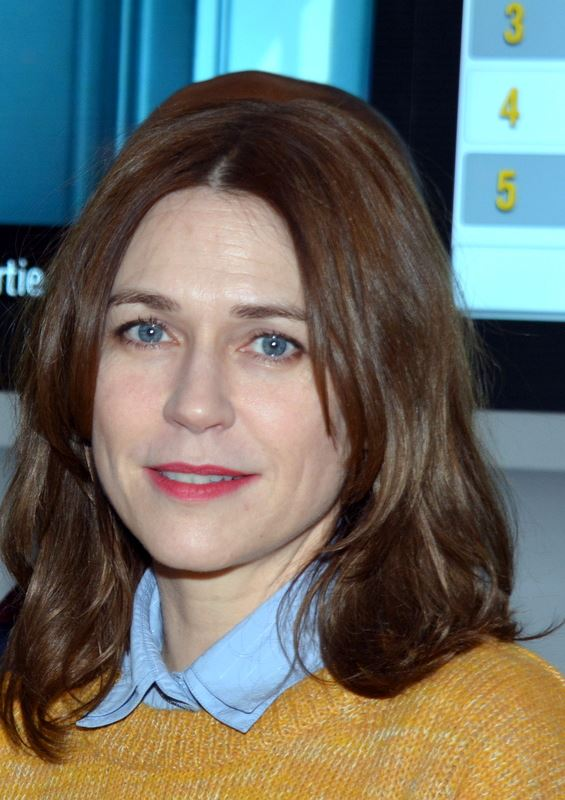
Marie-Josée Croze received some positive reviews for her performance.

Justine Smith gave the film three stars in The Montreal Gazette, crediting Pilon for showing Northern Canada naturally as well as symbolically, and remarking on the "differing but complementary styles" of Croze and Ungalaaq. In La Presse, Marc-André Lussier gave it film three stars, saying the town of Iqaluit becomes a character in the story, heightened by Robert Marcel Lepage's music but undermined by the writing, and complimented Ungalaaq and Croze. La Presse critic Yves Bergeras highlighted Ungalaq and the cinematography of Michel La Veaux. The audience in Iqaluit enjoyed the film and asked Pilon, who attended the premiere, for a sequel.

At the 6th Canadian Screen Awards, Ungalaaq received a nomination for Best Supporting Actor. At the 20th Quebec Cinema Awards, La Veaux also received a nomination for Best Cinematography.
