= A Respectable Woman =

A Respectable Woman may refer to:

- a short story by Kate Chopin
- A Respectable Woman (film), a 2023 drama film directed by Bernard Émond
