= Le Club des 100 Watts =

Quebec youth TV show (1988–1995)

Le Club des 100 Watts is a youth TV show that aired in late afternoons on Radio-Québec (now Télé-Québec). It premiered on 29 August 1988 and concluded 2 June 1995. It was hosted by Marc-André Coallier for its first six seasons and Jean-Marie Lapointe for the final season. The series won 12 Prix Gémaux throughout its run.

== Overview ==
The series, targeting a pre-teen audience, was said to be "forbidden to adults", as noted in its opening.

On average, half the episodes focused on dramatic plots, showing the lives of children and their families. The other half focused primarily on comedic sketches, interpreted by Quebec celebrities such as Marc Labrèche, Guylaine Tremblay, Claude Legault, and Bernard Fortin. The series also featured other segments, such as vox pops featuring Quebec youth, as well as lip sync contests.

In spring 1994, host Marc-André Coallier announced his departure from the show, citing a desire to move to more family-oriented series. At the end of August, Jean-Marie Lapointe was announced as the new host of the show, which was retitled simply Les 100 watts. The new season premiered on 2 October 1994, but was much less popular than the previous seasons, leading to the series' cancellation in spring 1995.

The theme song was performed by Alain Couture, who later found success as the lead singer of the Quebec rock group Mercedes Band.
