= The Novena =

French-language Canadian drama film

- French: La Neuvaine
- Directed by: Bernard Émond
- Written by: Bernard Émond
- Produced by: Bernadette Payeur
- Starring: Élise Guilbault; Patrick Drolet
- Cinematography: Jean-Claude Labrecque
- Edited by: Louise Côté
- Music by: Robert Marcel Lepage
- Production company: ACPAV
- Release date: August 2005 (Locarno)
- Running time: 97 minutes
- Country: Canada
- Language: French

The Novena (French: La Neuvaine) is a 2005 Canadian drama film, directed by Bernard Émond.

An exploration of faith, the film centres on the interaction between Jeanne (Élise Guilbault), an atheist doctor who is suffering from clinical depression and wants to commit suicide after one of her patients is murdered by an abusive husband, and François (Patrick Drolet), a young, deeply religious man who is fervently praying for a miracle to save his dying grandmother. The film is the first in a trilogy inspired by the Catholic theological virtues of faith, hope and charity, which continued with Summit Circle (Contre toute espérance) in 2007 and The Legacy (La Donation) in 2009.

== Cast ==
- Élise Guilbault as Jeanne
- Patrick Drolet as François
- Marie-Josée Bastien as Bénévole refuge
- Claude Binet as M. Tremblay
- Luc Bourgeois as Urgentologue
- Lise Castonguay as Thérèse
- Richard Champagne as Agent de sécurité
- Pierre Collin as Prêtre confident
- Benoît Dagenais as Docteur Langlais
- Stéphane Demers as Mari de Lise
- Raoul Desmeules as Un aide
- Muriel Dutil as Mère de Jeanne
- Denise Gagnon as Grand-mère
- Amélie Grenier as Femme du refuge
- Éveline Gélinas as Jeune mère qui témoigne
- Paul Hébert as Prêtre qui bénit
- Bonfield Marcoux as Curé du village
- Guillaume Meloche as Patient urgence
- Isabelle Pastena as Femme du refuge
- Micheline Poitras as Femme du refuge
- Lyne Riel as Femme du refuge
- Isabelle Roy as Lise
- Paul Savoie as Mari de Jeanne
- Michelle Sirois as Infirmière urgence (billed as Michèle Sirois)
- Jean-François Sénécal as Agent de sécurité
- Diane Verreault as Ambulancier
- Ghislaine Vincent as Madame Filion

== Accolades ==
It premiered at the Locarno Film Festival in 2005, where it won three awards including Best Actor for Drolet. In December 2005, it was named to the Toronto International Film Festival's annual Canada's Top Ten list of the year's best films.

The film did not receive any Genie Award nominations, as its distributor deliberately chose not to submit the film at all. It received eight Prix Jutra nominations, including Best Film, Best Director (Émond), Best Actor (Drolet), Best Actress (Guilbault), Best Screenplay (Émond), Best Cinematography (Jean-Claude Labrecque), Best Editing (Louise Côté) and Best Music (Robert Marcel Lepage). Guilbault won the Jutra for Best Actress.
