= Summit Circle =

- French: Contre toute espérance
- Directed by: Bernard Émond
- Written by: Bernard Émond
- Produced by: Bernadette Payeur
- Starring: Guylaine Tremblay; Guy Jodoin; Gildor Roy; René-Daniel Dubois; Serge Houde
- Cinematography: Jean-Claude Labrecque
- Edited by: Louise Côté
- Music by: Robert M. Lepage
- Production company: ACPAV
- Distributed by: Les Films Séville
- Release date: 2007 (Canada)
- Running time: 85 minutes
- Country: Canada
- Language: French

Summit Circle (French: Contre toute espérance) is a 2007 French-Canadian feature from Bernard Émond. The second in his trilogy of films on the Christian virtues of faith, hope and charity, which began with The Novena (La Neuvaine) in 2005 and concluded with The Legacy (La Donation) in 2009. It was screened at the 2007 Toronto International Film Festival.

== Synopsis ==
Réjeanne (Guylaine Tremblay) is a switchboard operator whose life is thrown into turmoil when her husband, Gilles (Guy Jodoin), suffers an apparent debilitating stroke. The film transpires in the past and the present, as a police officer (René-Daniel Dubois) in the latter tries to solve Gilles's suspicious death (did Réjeanne kill her husband or not?), while the former shows the deterioration of the couple's marriage. A sparse, deliberately paced film, shot in a cinéma-vérité style that continues director Bernard Émond's exploration of the theological themes of faith, hope and charity.

== Critical response ==
- "Summit Circle, with its deliberate, undifferentiated calmness, is a prime example of soporific filmmaking, not because it's dull (it's not) but because it's determined that no outbursts, whether of joy or sorrow, will muss up the benumbing tranquility. A little shake-up would have gone a long way toward making this tragedy a more affecting work." –Variety
- "Contre toute espérance is a movie one lives instead of watches. It affirms Émond's position as one of Canada's – and the world's — great humanist filmmakers."

== Awards ==
Prix Jutra – Best Actress (Guylaine Tremblay)
