= A Respectable Woman (film) =

- French: Une femme respectable
- Directed by: Bernard Émond
- Written by: Bernard Émond
- Based on: "Such Is Life" by Luigi Pirandello
- Produced by: Bernadette Payeur
- Starring: Hélène Florent; Martin Dubreuil
- Cinematography: Nicolas Canniccioni
- Edited by: Annie Jean
- Production company: ACPAV
- Release date: June 28, 2023 (Munich)
- Running time: 103 minutes
- Country: Canada
- Language: French

A Respectable Woman (French: Une femme respectable) is a 2023 Canadian drama film, written and directed by Bernard Émond.

Adapted in part from Luigi Pirandello's short story "Such Is Life (Pena di vivere cosi)" and set in Trois-Rivières, Quebec, in the 1930s, the film stars Hélène Florent as Rose Lemay, a woman who reluctantly agrees to take back her ex-husband Paul-Émile (Martin Dubreuil) after the death of the woman he left her for 11 years earlier, even though Paul-Émile is not genuinely interested in rekindling their relationship so much as in finding a new mother for his three children from the other relationship.

The cast also includes Paul Savoie, Brigitte Lafleur, Juliette Maxyme Proulx and Normand Canac-Marquis.

The film entered production in 2022, with shooting taking place in Trois-Rivières and Rosemont.

It premiered at the Filmfest München on June 28, 2023, and opened commercially on August 18.

== Awards ==
Award	Date of ceremony	Category	Recipient(s)	Result	Ref(s)
Prix Iris	December 10, 2023	Best Actress	Hélène Florent	Nominated	
Prix Iris	December 10, 2023	Best Costume Design	Sophie Lefebvre	Nominated	
Prix Iris	December 10, 2023	Best Hairstyling	André Duval	Nominated	
