= Élise Guilbault =

Canadian actress

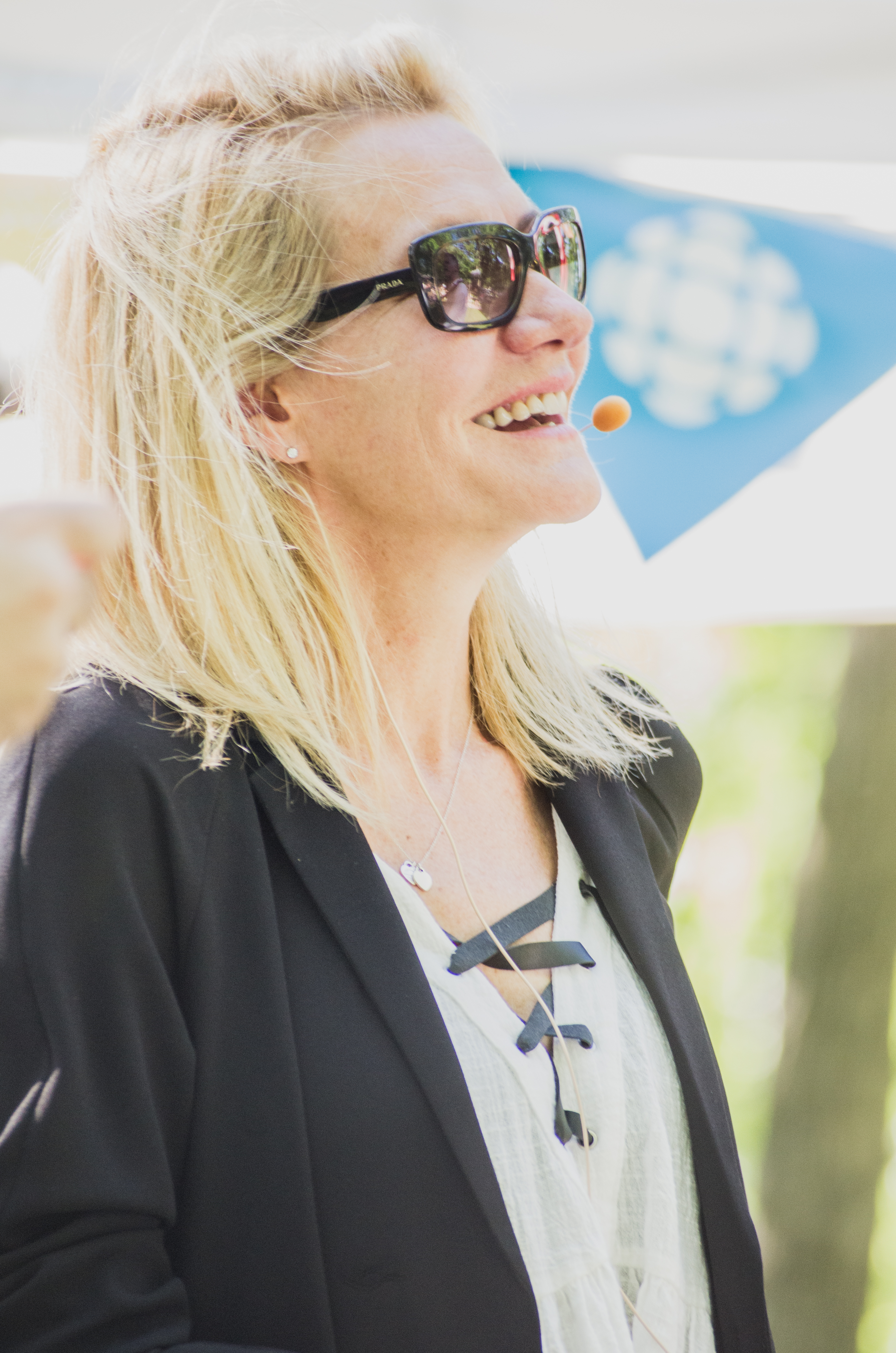
- Born: April 8, 1961 (age 64); Saint-Lin–Laurentides, Quebec, Canada
- Years active: 1980s–present

Élise Guilbault (born April 8, 1961) is a Canadian film and television actress. She is most noted for her performances in the film The Woman Who Drinks (La Femme qui boit), for which she won both the Genie Award for Best Actress at the 22nd Genie Awards and the Jutra Award for Best Actress at the 4th Jutra Awards, and the film The Novena (La Neuvaine), for which she won the Jutra for Best Actress at the 8th Jutra Awards. She won the 1992 Prix Guy-L'Écuyer for Cap Tourmente.

She was previously a Genie nominee at the 14th Genie Awards in 1993 for Cap Tourmente, and a Jutra/Iris nominee at the 12th Jutra Awards for The Legacy (La Donation) and the 20th Quebec Cinema Awards for A Place to Live (Pour vivre ici).

== Filmography ==
=== Film ===
Year	Title	Role	Notes
1988	Sortie 234		
1991	Nuits d'Afrique		
1991	Rispondetemi	Mother	
1991	Phantom Life (La vie fantôme)	Ghislaine	
1993	Cap Tourmente	Alfa O'Neill	
1994	Desire in Motion (Mouvements du désir)	Blind woman	
1994	Chili's Blues (C'était le 12 du 12 et Chili avait les blues)	Woman in heels	
1996	Cosmos	Real estate agent	
2001	The Woman Who Drinks (La Femme qui boit)	Paulette	
2002	Suburban Bliss (Secret de banlieue)	Maryse	
2005	The Novena (La Neuvaine)	Jeanne Dion	
2009	L'amarre		
2009	The Legacy (La Donation)	Jeanne Dion	
2012	Lilly	Lilly Rochon	
2012	The Bossé Empire (L'Empire Bo$$e)	Angelina Bossé	
2015	On My Mother's Side (L'Origine des espèces)	Agathe	
2016	The Notion of Mistake (La Notion d'erreur)	Madeleine	
2018	A Place to Live (Pour vivre ici)	Monique Langevin	
2021	Mourir en vie	Esther	
2023	One Summer (Le temps d'un été)	Sister Monique	
2023	Victoire (La Cordonnière)	Victoire du Sault, age 60	

=== Television ===
Year	Title	Role	Notes
1992	Montréal P.Q.	Thérèse Bissonnette	
1992-1995	Avec un grand A	Patricia Marleau/Suzie/Manon Beaupré	Three episodes
1993	Blanche	Dr. Gauthier	One episode
1994	René Lévesque		
1993	Les grands procès	Mme Beaudry	One episode
1995	Alys Robi	Albertine Robitaille	
1996	Innocence		Three episodes
1997	Les Bâtisseurs d'eau		
1998	Réseaux	Évelyne Marotte	
1998	La Part des anges	Patricia Paradis	
1999-2001	2 frères	Josiane Leblanc	24 episodes
2000	Albertine in Five Times (Albertine, en cinq temps)	Albertine at 40	
2001	Emma	Emma Dauphin	
2001-2023	Un gars, une fille	Élise	
2002	Annie et ses hommes	Myriam	
2003-2005	Grande ourse	Blanche von Trieck	20 episodes
2005	Détect Inc.	Janet	
2005-2007	Le Cœur a ses raisons	Britany Jenkins	Nine episodes
2006-2009	Les Hauts et les bas de Sophie Paquin	Estelle Poliquin	43 episodes
2009-2013	Yamaska	Réjeanne Gagné	50 episodes
2011	Penthouse 5-0	Estelle Poliquin	13 episodes
2013	En thérapie	Françoise	
2015-2016	Mensonges	Corinne Caron	12 episodes
2016	Legacy: A Kate McDougal Investigation	Marquise Létourneau	Six episodes
2016	La Fouille	The Multimillionaire	
2016	Ça décolle	Mother	
2016-2019	Unité 9	Kim	41 episodes
2017	Cheval serpent	Dominique Lévesque	Five episodes
2019	The Wall (La Faille)	Diane Tremblay-Ricard	Seven episodes
2020	Mon fils	Marielle Bilodeau	Six episodes
2021	District 31	Élyse Darveau	One episode
2021	Nous	Anne Denicourt	
2024	Anna Comes Home (Le retour d'Anna Brodeur)	Monique	
