= A Life Begins =

- French: Une vie qui commence
- Directed by: Michel Monty
- Written by: Michel Monty
- Produced by: Pierre Even; Josée Vallée
- Starring: Julie Le Breton; Raymond Cloutier; Rita Lafontaine; François Papineau; Charles Antoine Perreault
- Cinematography: Michel La Veaux
- Edited by: Dominique Fortin
- Production companies: Cirrus Communications; Item 7
- Distributed by: Alliance Vivafilm
- Release dates: November 21, 2010 (Paris Semaine du Québec); January 21, 2011 (Canada)
- Running time: 103 minutes
- Country: Canada
- Language: French

A Life Begins (French: Une vie qui commence) is a 2010 Canadian French language drama film, directed and written by Michel Monty, his debut long feature. The film's original working title was Cent milliards de neurones ("One Hundred Billion Neurons").

== Plot ==
Following the death of his doctor father (François Papineau) from an overdose of prescription drugs in the 1960s, 12-year-old Étienne (Charles Antoine Perreault) starts down the same path in an obsessive attempt to both replace and honor his memory.

== Cast ==
- Charles Antoine Perreault: Étienne Langevin (the son)
- François Papineau: Jacques Langevin (father)
- Julie Le Breton: Louise Langevin (mother)
- Raymond Cloutier: Guy Langevin (grandfather)
- Rita Lafontaine: grandmother
- Juliette Vermes-Monty:Marie-Ève
- Mathis Brisson: Martin
- Éliane Préfontaine: Patricia
- Étienne Soucy-Lord: Michel Meilleur
- Yves Sauvé: Michel Monty

== Awards ==
The film received six Jutra Award nominations at the 14th Jutra Awards in 2012, for Best Actor (Perreault), Best Actress (Le Breton), Best Supporting Actor (Papineau), Best Costume Design (Ginette Magny), Best Hair (Martin Lapointe) and Best Makeup (Diane Simard).
