= Paul Savoie =

Canadian actor (born 1946)

Paul Savoie (born May 21, 1946) is a Canadian actor from Quebec. He is most noted for his performance in the 2015 film The Diary of an Old Man (Le Journal d’un vieil homme), for which he was a Prix Iris nominee for Best Actor at the 18th Quebec Cinema Awards in 2016, and won the award for Best Performance in a Borsos Competition Film at the Whistler Film Festival.

== Filmography ==
=== Films ===
- For Better or For Worse (Pour le meilleur ou pour le pire) - 1975
- A Scream from Silence (Mourir à tue-tête) - 1979
- Lucien Brouillard - 1983
- Sonatine - 1984
- C'est congé aujourd'hui - 1984
- The Alley Cat (Le Matou) - 1985
- Juste un enfant - 1987
- Looking for Eternity (Portion d'éternité) - 1989
- Laura Laur - 1989
- Un léger vertige - 1991
- Joseph K.: L'homme numéroté - 1991
- Lover (Amoureuse) - 1992
- The Saracen Woman (La Sarrasine) - 1992
- Mistaken Identity (Erreur sur la personne) - 1996
- The Caretaker's Lodge (La Conciergerie) - 1997
- Battle of the Brave (Nouvelle-France) - 2004
- Familia - 2005
- The Novena (La Neuvaine) - 2005
- Family History (Histoire de famille) - 2006
- Le Banquet - 2008
- The Girl in the White Coat - 2011
- The Masters of Suspense (Les Maîtres du suspense) - 2014
- The Diary of an Old Man (Le Journal d’un vieil homme) - 2015
- A Brother's Love (La Femme de mon frère) - 2019
- A Respectable Woman (Une femme respectable) - 2023

=== Television ===
- Le Gutenberg - 1976
- Les As - 1977
- Caroline - 1979
- Les fils de la liberté - 1981
- S.O.S. j'écoute - 1982
- Marc-Aurèle Fortin, ou La Manière Noire - 1982
- Un amour de quartier - 1984
- Marilyn - 1991
- Scoop - 1992-95
- Diva - 1997
- Canada: A People's History - 2000
- La vie, la vie - 2001
- Les super mamies - 2002
- Bunker, le cirque - 2002
- Le bleu du ciel - 2004
- Marie Antoinette - 2006
- Les Sœurs Elliot - 2007
- Toc Toc Toc - 2007
- Mirador - 2010
- Toute la vérité- 2010
- Yamaska - 2011-12
- Trauma - 2012-14
- True North - 2016-21
- Cheval Serpent - 2017
- Les Invisibles - 2019
- En tout cas - 2020
