= Michel Monty =

Canadian film writer and actor

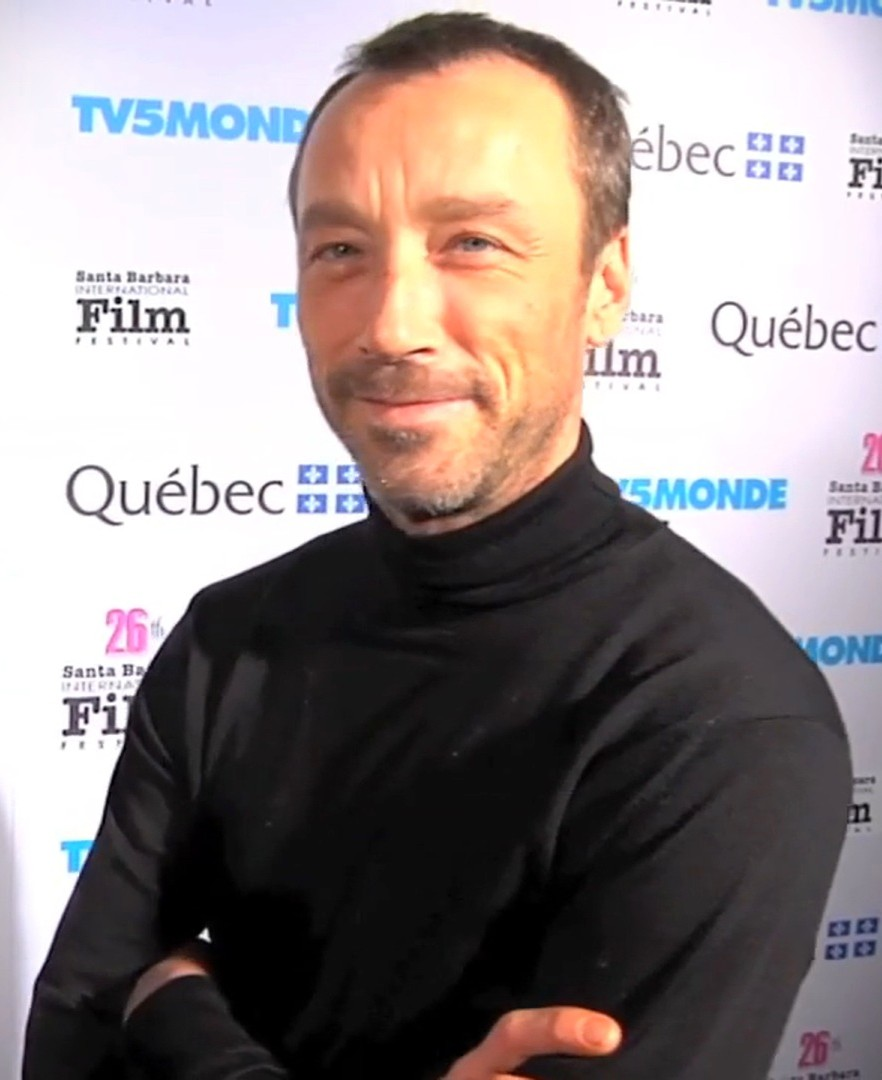
Monty in 2011

Michel Monty is a Canadian film writer, director, editor and actor mostly for television. His first long feature was A Life Begins (Une vie qui commence), which premiered at the film festival Cinéma du Québec à Paris.

Michel Monty graduated from Conservatoire d’art dramatique de Montréal in 1989 and has taught at the same academy. He also establishing co-founder of Transthéâtre group.

== Filmography ==
=== Director ===
- 2010: A Life Begins (Une vie qui commence)

== Editor ==
- 2009: Dirty Sax (short) - editing and sound engineer

== Actor ==
- 1982: Une vie as Frank Jourdan (TV series)
- 1995: 10-07: L'affaire Zeus as René Dionne(TV series)
- 1999: Restless Spirits as François Coli (TV movie)
- 2000: The Hunger (TV series) - in one episode "The Seductress" as Bradley
- 2001: Fred-dy as François Falardeau (TV series)
- 2004: 15/Love (TV series) as Henri Dubé in 4 episodes: "Scourge of the Frankenrival", "Midnight Snack Club", "The French Deception" and "Studentia Jockulus"
