= Looking for Eternity =

- French: Portion d'éternité
- Directed by: Robert Favreau
- Screenplay by: Robert Favreau
- Produced by: Marie-Andrée Vinet
- Starring: Marc Messier; Danielle Proulx; Paul Savoie
- Cinematography: Guy Dufaux
- Edited by: Hélène Girard
- Music by: Marie Bernard
- Production company: Les Productions du regard
- Distributed by: Prima Films
- Release date: August 1989 (FFM)
- Running time: 106 minutes
- Country: Canada
- Language: French

Looking for Eternity (French: Portion d'éternité) is a Canadian science fiction drama film, directed by Robert Favreau and released in 1989. The film stars Paul Savoie as Antoine, a doctor running a fertility clinic; after Pierre (Marc Messier) and Marie (Danielle Proulx), an infertile couple who were clients of his clinic, are killed in a car accident, he is drawn into a legal battle with Pierre's father (Gilles Pelletier), who wants their embryos destroyed, while Antoine himself wants to use them to test his theory that a form of immortality can be achieved through cloning.

The cast also includes Patricia Nolin as Hélène, a government agent investigating Antoine's clinic, as well as Maryse Gagné, Raymond Cloutier, Johanne-Marie Tremblay, Daniel Gadouas, Hélène Mercier and Mark Hellman in supporting roles.

== Production and distribution ==
The film was Favreau's narrative feature debut, after several documentary films. It premiered at the 1989 Montreal World Film Festival, where it won the award for Best Canadian Film and Proulx won the award for Best Actress.

== Critical response ==
Pat Donnelly of the Montreal Gazette reviewed the film negatively, writing that "at its best, Portion d'éternité is a quasi-documentary that dares to go where no legislator wants to - into the ethical questions surrounding reproductive technology. At its worst, it's a sensationalistic science-fiction téléroman on the trendy subject of in-vitro fertilization."
