= Norbourg scandal =

Canadian financial scandal

The Norbourg scandal is a major financial scandal that took place in 2005. The scandal involved the Montreal, Quebec based Norbourg Financial Group, a trust-fund company founded by Vincent Lacroix. He diverted money from a Norbourg trust fund for personal interests. Nearly 9,200 investors in Quebec lost millions of dollars. It is considered as one of the largest Canadian financial scandals in history and largest in Quebec.

== Origins ==
The scandal came into light during the summer of 2005 after the Autorité des marchés financiers (AMF - "Financial Markets Authority"; the province's top financial regulator) discovered that C$130 million was missing from company accounts. The loss was initially estimated at C$70 million before a report by Ernst & Young revealed additional losses. On August 25, 2005, police raided the Norbourg headquarters office in Montreal as well as smaller offices in Quebec City and in the Eastern Townships region. After having its assets frozen, the company ceased its operations in October 2005 and filed for bankruptcy. Lacroix himself was declared bankrupt in May 2006 by a provincial judge. A report by Ernst & Young revealed that all firms run by Lacroix including Norbourg Gestion d'actifs, Norbourg Groupe Financier, and Fonds Évolution had operational deficits up to $6.5 million in 2005 alone.

The AMF filed 51 charges against Lacroix in March 2006 related to false and misleading information and manipulating mutual fund values. The regulator accused Lacroix of using Norbourg's funds for personal reasons. 29 funds were affected, with 11 of them having nearly no value left and 17 others having C$300,000 or less left.

== Investigation and fraud tactics ==
Investigators reviewed some of the transactions and cheques dating back to 2000 and found 69 files related to the 51 charges. However, funds were diverted starting in 2003 and the deficit ballooned from $9 million to $70 million and finally up to $130 million. Money was diverted from the funds to a "ghost account", some of which was transferred to Lacroix and his wife. False receipts were also made to hide the company's losses. In addition, Norbourg hired a computer specialist to falsify reports to Northern Trust, whose Toronto office was asset custodian for the Norbourg and Evolution funds. The worker had access to all the financial data of Norbourg.

Some of the stolen money was paid out in bonuses and gifts to favored Norbourg employees; one employee's house was purchased with embezzled funds. It was reported that Lacroix filed up to 115 false reports with securities regulators. Each charge had a maximum penalty of five years in jail and a fine of up to C$5 million. In October 2005, the AMF also sued Lacroix for C$94 million and an investigation was also launched by the Royal Canadian Mounted Police (RCMP).

== Investors ==
Up to 9,200 investors were affected by the crime. Many of the investors involved asked the province of Quebec to launch a public inquiry. The Action démocratique du Québec and the Parti Québécois also asked the provincial government of Jean Charest to appoint an investigating commission. In June 2006, Ernst & Young agreed to distribute C$31 million to about 5,600 investors who were among those hardest hit. The AMF offered settlements to 900 investors, but denied the rest. According to the AMF, investors are not protected from fraud in embezzlement made by an administrator of equity funds and thus don't receive a settlement, unlike fraud by a stockbroker, where an investor can receive as much as $200,000 in settlement. 140 other investors later launched a class action accusing the regulator of abusing its power.

On January 19, 2011 CBC reported that an agreement has been reached under which all investors would be fully reimbursed.

== Criminal trial ==
Lacroix's criminal trial took place in 2007 and lasted 58 days. Lacroix did not have legal defense aid after a court ruling. In November 2007, he requested 30 witnesses to testify in his place, but this request was rejected by the trial judge, Claude Leblond. Lacroix claimed that he could not testify himself because his credibility was attacked. On December 11, 2007 Lacroix was found guilty of all 51 counts. On January 28, 2008, he was sentenced to 12 years in prison and fined C$255,000. On June 6, 2008, he received permission to appeal his sentence.

== Further charges in June 2008 ==
On June 18, 2008, a further 922 criminal charges were laid against six people involved in the scandal, including Lacroix and former Quebec provincial civil servant Jean Renaud. Charges included fraud and conspiracy to commit fraud, falsifying documents and conspiracy to falsify documents, and money laundering. Renaud was fired by the Province hours before his arrest.

Lacroix, who was released during the summer of 2009, went through a transition home and performed several hours of community work. On September 21, he returned to trial for the additional criminal charges and pleaded guilty on September 21. He was immediately jailed by Justice Richard Wagner of the Quebec Superior Court. On October 9, 2009, he was sentenced to 13 years in jail to be served consecutively with his previous 5-year term. He was released from prison in January 2011 and spent the next 3 years in a halfway home, until February 2014.

== Portrayals ==
Lacroix inspired the character of Vincent Lemieux in Robert Morin's film Daddy Goes Ptarmigan Hunting (Papa à la chasse aux lagopèdes).

The events that lead the charges laid against Lacroix are portrayed in the film Norbourg, directed by Maxime Giroux, starring Vincent-Guillaume Otis, François Arnaud, and Christine Beaulieu.

== See also ==
- Earl Jones (investment advisor)
