= You Are Warm, You Are Warm =

- French: Tu brûles... tu brûles...
- Directed by: Jean-Guy Noël
- Written by: Jean-Guy Noël
- Produced by: René Gueissaz
- Starring: Gabriel Arcand; Guy L'Écuyer
- Cinematography: François Beauchemin
- Edited by: Marthe de la Chevrotière
- Music by: Michel Gonneville
- Production company: ACPAV
- Release date: April 12, 1973
- Running time: 93 minutes
- Country: Canada
- Language: French

You Are Warm, You Are Warm (French: Tu brûles... tu brûles..., lit. "You Are Burning, You Are Burning") is a Canadian drama film, directed by Jean-Guy Noël and released in 1973. The film stars Gabriel Arcand as Gabriel, a young man who grew up as the son of a firefighter (Guy L'Écuyer) in a small town in Quebec, but rejects the social expectation that he will follow his father into the same profession, and starts living as a virtual hermit in the forest until moving to Montreal in search of something more for himself.

The cast also includes Louise Francoeur, Raymond Lévesque, Serge Thériault, Marie Eykel, Janine Lebel, Pierre Curzi, Julien Poulin, François Boulerice, Arlette Couture, Dominique Chartrand, Georges Laterreur, Émile Couture, Robert Gagnon, Laurianne Laterreur, Katia Nelson, Germain St-Louis, Jacques Paquet, Yves Soutière, Alain Soutière, Victorin Paillé, Jean-Jacques Trudel, Nicole Trudel and Paul Vincent.

Considered to be a cross between fable and social satire, the film is commonly analyzed alongside André Forcier's Bar Salon as one of the first significant works of the new generation of Quebec filmmakers to emerge in the early 1970s.
