= Le cœur a ses raisons =

- Created by: Marc Brunet
- Starring: Marc Labrèche; Anne Dorval
- Country of origin: Canada
- Original language: French
- No. of series: 3
- No. of episodes: 39

Production
- Production locations: Montreal, Quebec
- Running time: approx. 21 min.

Original release
- Network: TVA
- Release: February 3, 2005 – December 3, 2007

Le cœur a ses raisons (The heart has its reasons) is a French-language Québécois téléroman which heavily parodies American soap operas, often involving great exaggeration to ridiculous proportions. The English translation of its title is The Heart Has Its Reasons, but its distributor chose to release it as Sins of Love. The title comes from Blaise Pascal, a 17th-century French author, who wrote, « Le cœur a ses raisons que la raison ne connaît point » ("The heart has its reasons that reason does not know"). It was written by author Marc Brunet and first appeared on television screens in February 2005 on the TVA television network.

The program was first shown in September 2001 as short segments during the show Le Grand Blond avec un show sournois, and became very popular, thus making way for a full television series. There were 17 short episodes preceding the first series.

The program airs internationally on TV5Monde. A Polish version of the show, entitled Grzeszni i bogaci (The Sinful and the Rich), premiered on October 25, 2009 on TVN television network.

== Synopsis ==
Doug Montgomery, beauty products tycoon, is discovered dead in his Saint-Andrews manor. His favorite son Brett, who gave up the running of the family company to pursue a career in gynecology is opposed to his twin brother Brad gaining complete control of the company.

Criquette, fiancée of Brett is then the victim of an attempted murder, suffering a gunshot wound to the chest. Emerge Ashley, her previously unknown twin sister and Peter, a rebellious police officer with rather unorthodox methods. It is by taking on the identity of her twin sister at Doug's funeral that Ashley tries to discover the identity of Criquette's assailant.

The reading of Doug's will ignites family rivalries, leaving the company in a precarious position. It is then discovered that Brad is married to Becky Walters, the president of a similar company and that they will have a black baby, Chris, despite Brad's sterility.

On April 28, 2005 the town of Saint-Andrews is hit by an enormous earthquake. It is not until the second series commences on 30 January 2006 that we learn who perished in and who survived the earthquake.

Saint-Andrews then welcomes the arrival of Brenda Montgomery, the triplet sister of Brad and Brett. The viewer learns of the survival of Becky and Brett, who was buried alive by his brother Brad, who pretends to have lost his arms to claim a large compensation payout from the insurance company.

Brenda takes possession of Montgomery International but is blown up during the Christmas special, which was shown in April 2006, setting the manor on fire, where the majority of the cast are stuck.

Who will survive the fire? Will Brenda return in another form? How will Criquette's baby be? Will Peter reveal the Montgomery curse? Will a relationship blossom between Brad and Drucilla? Is Hook's botox flammable?

== Episodes ==
=== Series 1 ===
1. La mort de Doug (3 February 2005)
2. Le retour d'Ashley (10 February 2005)
3. Le testament de Doug (17 February 2005)
4. La mystérieuse Becky (24 February 2005)
5. L'épidémie à St-Andrews (3 March 2005)
6. A la recherche de Brett (10 March 2005)
7. Les tragiques retrouvailles de Brett et Criquette (17 March 2005)
8. La naissance d'un Montgomery (24 March 2005)
9. La demande en mariage (31 March 2005)
10. Le rival des Montgomery (7 April 2005)
11. Criquette en péril (14 April 2005)
12. L'assailant de Criquette démasqué (21 April 2005)
13. Brett et Criquette face à leur destin (28 April 2005)

=== Series 2 ===
1. L'héritière des Montgomery (30 January 2006)
2. La déchéance de Criquette (6 February 2006)
3. La résurrection de Brett (13 February 2006)
4. Criquette à la rescousse de St-Andrews (20 February 2006)
5. À la recherche de Becky (27 February 2006)
6. Le secret de Criquette (6 March 2006)
7. La supercherie de Brad (13 March 2006)
8. L'ambition de Criquette (20 March 2006)
9. L'attentat à St-Andrews (27 March 2006)
10. L'ange de St-Andrews (3 April 2006)
11. Tragédie aérienne à Saint-Andrews (10 April 2006)
12. Périple infernal dans le désert (17 April 2006)
13. Noël chez les Montgomery (24 April 2006)

=== Series 3 ===
1. La résurrection des Montgomery (10 September 2007)
2. Le rapt de Doug Doug (17 September 2007)
3. Un amour en péril (24 September 2007)
4. Criquette suspendue entre la vie et la mort (1 October 2007)
5. L'inattendu retour de Brenda (8 October 2007)
6. Le mystérieux mystère entourant la mystérieuse maîtresse du mystérieux Brett (October 15, 2007)
7. À la rescousse de Doug Doug (October 22, 2007)
8. À la poursuite de Ridge (October 29, 2007)
9. Pour l'amour de Doug Doug (November 5, 2007)
10. La félicité de Criquette (November 12, 2007)
11. La fabuleuse interview de Megan (November 19, 2007)
12. La malédiction des Montgomery (November 26, 2007)
13. Le somptueux bal des Montgomery (December 3, 2007)

== Casting ==
- Marc Labrèche: Brett / Brad / Brenda / Clifford Montgomery
- Anne Dorval: Criquette / Ashley Rockwell
- Pierre Brassard: Ridge Taylor
- Pascale Bussières: Becky Walters
- Patrice Coquereau: Lewis
- Michèle Deslauriers: Madge
- Sophie Faucher: Crystale Bouvier-Montgomery
- Macha Grenon: Megan Barrington-Montgomery
- James Hyndman: Peter Malboro
- Élise Guilbault: Britany Jenkins
- Jean-Michel Anctil: Révérend MacDougall
- Stéphane Rousseau: Bo Bellingsworth
- Guylaine Tremblay: Melody Babcock
- Annie Dufresne: Brooke Gallaway
- Anthony Kavanagh: Brock Steel
- Lise Dion: Drucilla Fleishman
- Albert Millaire: Doug Montgomery
- Isabelle Boulay: Googy MacPherson
- Patrick Huard: Bat Wilson

=== Casting of version in Le grand blond avec show sournois ===
- Pierrette Robitaille Catharina
- Gildor Roy Derek
- Sylvie Moreau Trixie
- Martin Matte Révérend Campbell
- Isabel Richer Misty
- Dominique Michel Crystale
- Patrice L'Écuyer Doug
- Jean-Michel Anctil Bruce
- Josée Deschênes Sœur Rebecca
- Chantal Lamarre Douina
- Guy A.Lepage Brandon
- Isabelle Boulay Brooke
