= The Descendant (film) =

2007 Canadian drama film

- Directed by: Philippe Spurrell
- Written by: Philippe Spurrell; Joel Asa Miller
- Produced by: Philippe Spurrell; David Rigby
- Starring: Tadhg MacMahon; Jim Reid; Ilona Garcen
- Cinematography: Lorenzo Negri; Ivan Gekoff
- Edited by: Eric Lavoie
- Music by: David Kristian
- Production companies: BOS Productions; Circus Maximus Films; Eklectika Moving Pictures
- Distributed by: Atlas Grove Entertainment
- Release date: May 7, 2007
- Running time: 95 minutes
- Country: Canada
- Language: English

The Descendant is a Canadian drama film, directed by Philippe Spurrell and released in 2007. The film stars Tadhg MacMahon as James, a man whose mother has recently died; discovering an old shoebox filled with birthday cards from his grandparents that he never received, he decides to go visit his grandparents, Maurice (Jim Reid) and Linda (Ilona Garcen) in the hopes of understanding why his mother broke off contact with them, only to unwittingly uncover supernatural hints of their community's history of slavery.

The film premiered on the festival circuit in 2007, before opening theatrically in Quebec in 2008.

C.J. Goldman received a Jutra Award nomination for Best Makeup at the 11th Jutra Awards in 2009.
