= Guylaine Tremblay =

Canadian actress

Guylaine Tremblay CM
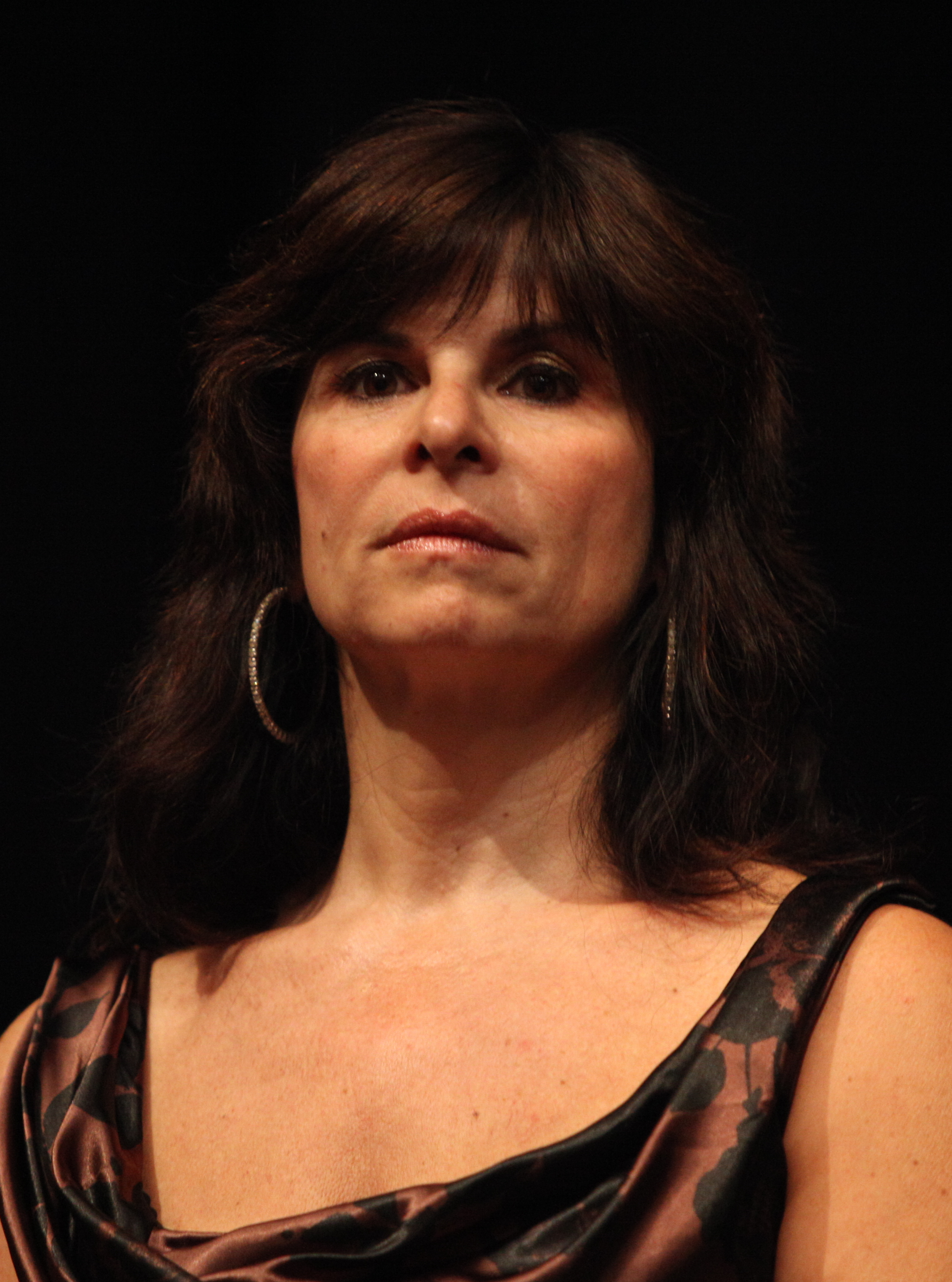
- Born: October 14, 1960 (age 65); Petite-Rivière-Saint-François, Quebec, Canada
- Occupation: Actress
- Years active: 1980s-present

Guylaine Tremblay CM CQ (born October 14, 1960) is a Canadian actress from Quebec. She is most noted for her performance in the film Summit Circle (Contre toute espérance), for which she won the Prix Jutra for Best Actress at the 10th Jutra Awards in 2008.

She was also nominated in the same category at the 2nd Jutra Awards in 2010 for Matroni and Me (Matroni et moi), at the 11th Jutra Awards in 2009 for Honey, I'm in Love (Le Grand Départ) and at the 13th Jutra Awards in 2011 for Mourning for Anna (Trois temps après la mort d'Anna), and for Best Supporting Actress at the 3rd Jutra Awards in 2001 for Life After Love (La Vie après l'amour) and at the 6th Jutra Awards in 2004 for 8:17 p.m. Darling Street (20h17 rue Darling).

== Filmography ==
=== Film ===
Year	Title	Role	Note
1998	Streetheart (Le Cœur au poing)	Marlene	
1999	Matroni and Me (Matroni et moi)	Guylaine	
2000	Life After Love (La vie après l'amour)	Sophie Taillon	
2001	Marriages (Mariages)	Hélène	
2002	Le Secret de Cyndia	Cyndia	
2003	8:17 p.m. Darling Street (20h17 rue Darling)	Angela	
2004	Love and Magnets (Les Aimants)	Paule Desroches	
2007	Summit Circle (Contre tout espérance)	Réjeanne Poulin	
2008	Honey, I'm in Love (Le Grand départ)	Céline Demers	
2010	Mourning for Anna (Trois temps après la mort d'Anna)	Françoise	
2013	Moroccan Gigolos	Catherine	
2014	Real Lies (Le vrai du faux)	Line Lebel	
2014	What Are We Doing Here? (Qu’est-ce qu’on fait ici ?)	Nicole	
2017	Father and Guns 2 (De père en flic 2)	Solange Bourgault	
2022	Two Days Before Christmas (23 décembre)	Marie-France	
2023	Testament		
2023	Katak: The Brave Beluga (Katak, le brave béluga)	Marine	French version
2024	Sisters and Neighbors! (Nos belles-sœurs)	Thérèse Dubuc	
2026	125, rue des Malaises	Chantal Pitre	

=== Television ===
Year	Title	Role	Note
1988	Le Club des 100 Watts		
1992	Avec un grand A	Geneviève	
1993-2009	La Petite Vie	Caro Paré	
1994	4 et demi	Jasmine Simard	
1996	Omerta	Diane	
1999-2000	Histoires de filles	Patricia Lalande	
2000	Albertine in Five Times (Albertine, en cinq temps)	Madeleine	
2001	Emma	Sylvie Légaré	
2002	24 poses	Carole	
2005	Le cœur a ses raisons	Melody Babcock	
2008	Annie et ses hommes	Annie	
2010-2012	Les Rescapés	Monique Boivin	
2012-2019	Unité 9	Marie Lamontagne	
2013	Toute la vérité	Judge Vallières	
2018-2020	En tout cas	Danielle	
2020	Le Phoenix	Louise Lussier	
2022	Anna et Arnaud	Anna	
2022	The Night Logan Woke Up (La nuit où Laurier Gaudreault s'est réveillé)	Monique Gaudreault	
