= Earl Jones (investment advisor) =

Canadian investment adviser and convicted fraudster

- Born: Bertram Earl Jones; June 24, 1942 (age 84); Montreal, Quebec, Canada
- Occupation: Former owner of investment advising business
- Motive: money, lavish lifestyle
- Criminal charges: Fraud
- Penalty: 11 years in prison

Bertram Earl Jones (born June 24, 1942) is a Canadian unlicensed investment adviser who pleaded guilty to running a Ponzi scheme that CBC News has reported cost his victims "a conservative estimate of about $51.3 million taken between 1982 and 2009". After pleading guilty to two charges of fraud in 2010, he was sentenced to 11 years in prison. After serving four years of his sentence, Jones was released on March 20, 2014.

== Early life ==
Jones was born in Montreal on June 24, 1942, and was raised in the neighbourhood of Notre-Dame-de-Grâce. In his twenties, he worked at Montreal Trust Company, where he was trained in handling estate planning and wills. Beginning around 1979, he started his own investment advising business, though he did not register as a financial adviser with any securities regulator.

== Ponzi scheme ==
The Montreal Gazette reported Jones promised modest, steady returns on investment similar to the scheme by American fraudster Bernard Madoff. However, Jones never invested any of the $50.3 million he raised. He spent $13 million to finance a lavish lifestyle and paid back $37 million to maintain the illusion of the 8% return he had promised. The 158 victims included his own brother and sister-in-law, who lost $1 million.

From July 9 to 26, 2009, he disappeared. CBC Radio One reported on July 16 that unless Jones returned, Quebec authorities would proceed with the insolvency proceedings of his firm in his absence. On July 27, Jones surrendered to police. Earl Jones Consultant and Administration Corporation and Earl Jones, personally, were declared bankrupt on July 29 and August 19, 2009, respectively. The Trustee reported Earl Jones and his wife Maxine (Heayberd) Jones had acquired four properties during the fraud: a lakefront Dorval, Quebec, condominium, a condominium on a golf course in Mont Tremblant, Quebec, and two properties in the United States.

On December 3, 2009, CBC Radio One reported that his Dorval, Quebec condo was for sale for $950,000 as part of the bankruptcy proceedings to partially pay off creditors. All properties were eventually sold, the proceeds paying for the Trustee and legal services. In fact, the creditors did not recover any money through bankruptcy proceedings, as Jones had heavily mortgaged three of the properties to keep his Ponzi scheme afloat.

On January 14, 2010, Global TV Montreal reported that Jones admitted in court filings to having engaged in a Ponzi scheme for at least twenty years. On January 15, Jones pleaded guilty to two counts of fraud. and on February 15, he was sentenced to 11 years imprisonment.

Throughout Jones’ career he developed a vast network of professional and financial liaisons, which included lawyers and notaries, mortgage and insurance brokers, and banks. By his own admission, Jones was an unregistered financial advisor and relied on these business relationships to perpetrate his fraud. While the Crown Prosecutor and Sûreté du Québec investigators could not find sufficient evidence of criminal complicity, pending legal action in the Civil Courts has sought compensation for the victims in the far-reaching fraud.

At the Ponzi scheme's most basic level, Jones collected money from individuals and estates and then returned some of that money as monthly interest payments. The fraud could only work for as long as Jones kept getting what forensic accountants call "fresh money". The so-called fresh money schemes required Jones to leverage the participation of his professional and financial relationships. Evidence produced in criminal and civil courts indicates Jones obtained the vast majority of fresh money by fraudulently liquidating his clients’ investment accounts and by coercing his clients to obtain mortgages on their homes.

== Earl Jones Victims Organizing Committee ==
Soon after Jones’ fraud was uncovered, the Earl Jones Victims Organizing Committee was formed to assist Jones' mostly elderly former clients. The committee consisted of eight sons and daughters of the former clients and their efforts would receive the backing of Stephen Harper, Prime Minister of Canada. Committee member Joey Davis would go on to be a key spokesperson for the victims, launching a Canada-wide "National Coalition against White-Collar Crime" and play a key role in passing Bill C-59, Abolition of Early Parole Act, ensuring a more lengthy prison term for Jones' crimes. Another committee member, Virginia Nelles, would eventually represent all victims in a class action lawsuit against the Royal Bank of Canada, the primary bank where Jones operated his Ponzi scheme.

The committee organized various Montreal-based community support groups, including the West Island Community Resource Center and Sun Youth Organization to provide financial relief to those most in need. Since many of Jones' former clients were unable to navigate the complicated process of collecting information for authorities, the committee also mobilized the victims to organize and obtain records of their dealings with Jones. This grass-roots forensic effort exposed a trail of professional and financial negligence, which directly assisted in the criminal prosecution and legal proceedings in the Quebec Superior Court against those professional and financial liaisons Jones leveraged to perpetrate his fraud.

== Pending civil litigation ==
=== Royal Bank of Canada (RBC) ===
On July 15, 2010, some of Jones' victims were authorized by a Quebec Superior Court judge to launch a class action suit against his banker, Royal Bank of Canada (RBC). They allege that RBC knew or should have known that Jones was misusing his RBC account and failed to take corrective measures. RBC claims not to know that Jones was misrepresenting its role in his affairs until his 2009 arrest. The suit was prompted by a Fifth Estate investigation that uncovered an internal memo dated November 7, 2001 showing that RBC knew Jones was passing off his personal account as an in-trust business account. RBC did not ask him to open a commercial account until 2008 - just before the scandal broke. The suit sought to recover about $40 million, the amount deposited into the account between 1981 and 2008. On March 6, 2012, CBC News reported that the class action lawsuit has been settled with investors getting about thirty cents on the dollar

=== RBC Dominion Securities ===
On February 7, 2011, a former client, on behalf of herself and her mother's Estate, filed a lawsuit in the Quebec Superior Courts against RBC Dominion Securities. The suit alleges that RBC enabled and assisted Jones to hijack, then fraudulently transfer, withdraw and misappropriate funds of the joint account held by the former client and her deceased mother. The Investment Industry Regulatory Organization of Canada is currently conducting an investigation into the issue, which includes the RBC Dominion Securities advisers involved in the case, Jean Pierre Menard and Serge Leclaire.

== Resolved civil litigation ==
=== Linda Frazer, notary ===
On August 2, 2010, lawyers representing another former client in a lawsuit in the Quebec Superior Courts against Industrial Alliance Insurance and Financial Services Inc, amended their Motion to Institute Proceedings to include notary Linda Frazer, a longtime associate of Jones. The suit alleges the Defendants acted with gross imprudence and negligence in the execution of a mortgage loan against the elderly client's home, which she had no knowledge of signing. Her Montreal townhouse was subsequently sold.

Frazer was later vindicated by a Superior Court Judgment dated May 18, 2012.

== See also ==
- Norbourg scandal
