= The Necessities of Life =

2008 Canadian drama film

- French: Ce qu'il faut pour vivre
- Directed by: Benoît Pilon
- Written by: Bernard Émond
- Produced by: René Chénier; Bernadette Payeur
- Starring: Natar Ungalaaq
- Cinematography: Michel La Veaux
- Edited by: Richard Comeau
- Music by: Robert Marcel Lepage
- Production company: ACPAV
- Distributed by: Seville Pictures
- Release dates: August 25, 2008 (Montréal); August 28, 2008 (Canada)
- Running time: 102 minutes
- Country: Canada
- Languages: French; Inuktitut

The Necessities of Life (French: Ce qu'il faut pour vivre) is a 2008 Canadian drama film directed by Benoît Pilon and starring Natar Ungalaaq, Éveline Gélinas and Paul-André Brasseur. Told in both French and Inuktitut, the film is about an Inuk man who is sent to Quebec for tuberculosis treatment.

The film was shot in Iqaluit, Nunavut and Quebec City. It received positive reviews and won four Genie Awards, including Best Direction for Pilon, and the Special Grand Prize of the Jury of the Montreal World Film Festival.

== Synopsis ==
In 1952, a tuberculosis epidemic is sweeping Northern Canada, and numerous Inuit are compelled by the government to seek treatment in the lower provinces. One Inuk man from Baffin Island, Tiivii, arrives at a sanatorium in Quebec City. He is treated by a French Canadian nurse, Carole. An orphaned boy, Kaki, also spends time with Tiivii in the institution.

Tiivii struggles with the language barrier, being unable to speak French. Kaki speaks both French and Inuktitut and can translate conversations between Tiivii and Carole. However, the relationship becomes awkward when Tiivii, through Kaki, asks Carole for sex. Kaki had advised him it was a bad idea, citing his greater understanding of white people, though Tiivii felt he had a better understanding of women. Tiivii hopes to adopt Kaki.

Tiivii is pronounced nearly cured and able to leave in a month. Kaki needs to have part of his lung removed, and Tiivii visits him often during his recovery, telling him a story that incorporates string figures. Kaki has a sudden episode and dies. He is buried in the hospital grounds, and in the last scene Tiivii is home with his family, having brought with him Kaki's model airplane.

== Cast ==
- Natar Ungalaaq as Tiivii
- Éveline Gélinas as Carole
- Paul-André Brasseur as Kaki
- Denis Bernard as Father Millaire
- Louise Marleau as Sister Luce
- Antoine Bertrand as Roger
- Guy Thauvette as Dr. Montpetit
- Luc Proulx
- Vincent-Guillaume Otis as Joseph
- Elisapie Isaac as Inuit mother

== Production ==
When director Benoît Pilon read Bernard Émond's screenplay, he wanted Inuk actor Natar Ungalaaq as the lead role after seeing him in the 2001 Inuit film Atanarjuat: The Fast Runner. Ungalaaq read the screenplay, and found the story personal as his real-life grandfather was diagnosed with tuberculosis during the historical epidemic in the 1950s. He did not disclose this story to the media until after the film was complete. For his role as Kaki, Paul-André Brasseur, who lived in Montreal and spoke French, learned his Inuktitut lines with Ungalaaq's aid.

The budget was $4 million. Filming took place over nearly a year, in numerous locations. Arctic scenes were shot around Iqaluit, Nunavut, and other scenes were shot in Quebec City, Quebec.

== Release ==
The film was first screened at the Montreal World Film Festival and at the Théâtre Maisonneuve on 25 August 2008. It opened in wider Quebec theatres on 29 August, and was re-released in Montreal, Quebec City and Sherbrooke on 3 April 2009.

After the film was submitted for consideration for the Academy Award for Best Foreign Language Film, Entertainment One granted distribution rights for the United States to IFC Films in January 2009. Entertainment One re-released the film in Toronto, Ontario and Vancouver, British Columbia in April 2009.

== Reception ==
=== Critical response ===
The film received mixed to positive reviews. The Necessities of Life has an approval rating of 60% on review aggregator website Rotten Tomatoes, based on 5 reviews, and an average rating of 6.2/10.

In Canada, Marc-André Lussier of La Presse called the film beautiful and Natar Ungalaaq strong and charismatic. The Montreal Gazette's Brendan Kelly called it "quite simply one of the best Quebecois films of the year." Normand Provencher of La Presse described it as intelligent and beautiful. In Maclean's, Brian D. Johnson assessed the film as "an immaculately crafted, deeply distressing drama," albeit difficult to watch given the subject matter. Johnson said Ungalaaq displayed grace, but at times was depicted as a noble savage. Linda Barnard, writing for The Toronto Star, called it "A gentle yet moving story," and praised Ungalaaq. Following Quebec's Jutra Awards, MP Marcel Proulx told the House of Commons of Canada in March 2009 that the film was a powerful statement on the distinct cultures of Nunavik and the rest of Quebec. MP Roger Pomerleau also publicly congratulated Ungalaaq.

Writing for Variety, Dennis Harvey said "Necessities knows just how to eke maximum poignancy from its events without seeming to manipulate for tearjerking effect." Dan Kois, writing for The Washington Post, called the film "thoughtful and, especially at its end, quite touching," but found it unoriginal and blandly directed. In The Chicago Reader, Cliff Doerksen said parts of the film appear to be no better than a TV movie, "but the acting is understated and strong."

=== Accolades ===
Canada submitted the film for consideration for the Academy Award for Best Foreign Language Film, one of the rare Canadian selections to feature a substantial amount of Inuktitut, following Atanarjuat: The Fast Runner. In January 2009, Academy members shortlisted the film among nine for the 81st Academy Awards, but it was not nominated. It received the most nominations at the 29th Genie Awards, with eight.

Award	Date of ceremony	Category	Recipient(s)	Result	Ref(s)
Genie Awards	4 April 2009	Best Motion Picture	Bernadette Payeur and René Chénier	Nominated	
Genie Awards	4 April 2009	Best Direction	Benoît Pilon	Won	
Genie Awards	4 April 2009	Best Original Screenplay	Bernard Émond	Won	
Genie Awards	4 April 2009	Best Actor	Natar Ungalaaq	Won	
Genie Awards	4 April 2009	Best Supporting Actress	Éveline Gélinas	Nominated	
Genie Awards	4 April 2009	Best Original Score	Robert Marcel Lepage	Nominated	
Genie Awards	4 April 2009	Best Editing	Richard Comeau	Won	
Genie Awards	4 April 2009	Best Costume Design	Francesca Chamberland	Nominated	
Jutra Awards	29 March 2009	Best Film	Bernadette Payeur and René Chénier	Won	
Jutra Awards	29 March 2009	Best Direction	Benoît Pilon	Nominated	
Jutra Awards	29 March 2009	Best Screenplay	Bernard Émond	Won	
Jutra Awards	29 March 2009	Best Actor	Natar Ungalaaq	Won	
Jutra Awards	29 March 2009	Best Music	Robert Marcel Lepage	Nominated	
Montreal World Film Festival	2008	Special Grand Prize of the Jury	Benoît Pilon	Won	
Montreal World Film Festival	2008	Most Popular Film of the Festival	Benoît Pilon	Won	
Montreal World Film Festival	2008	Most Popular Canadian Feature Film	Benoît Pilon	Won	
Toronto Film Critics Association	16 December 2009	Best Canadian Film	Benoît Pilon	Runner-up	
Vancouver Film Critics Circle	13 January 2009	Best Canadian Film	Benoît Pilon	Nominated	
Vancouver Film Critics Circle	13 January 2009	Best Actor in a Canadian Film	Natar Ungalaaq	Won	

== See also ==
- Aboriginal peoples in Northern Canada
- List of submissions to the 81st Academy Awards for Best Foreign Language Film
- List of Canadian submissions for the Academy Award for Best Foreign Language Film
