= Daddy Goes Ptarmigan Hunting =

- French: Papa à la chasse aux lagopèdes
- Directed by: Robert Morin
- Written by: Robert Morin
- Produced by: André-Line Beauparlant; Stéphanie Morissette
- Starring: François Papineau
- Cinematography: Robert Morin
- Edited by: Michel Giroux
- Production company: Coop Vidéo de Montréal
- Release date: November 21, 2008
- Running time: 91 minutes
- Country: Canada
- Language: French

Daddy Goes Ptarmigan Hunting (French: Papa à la chasse aux lagopèdes) is a Canadian drama film, directed by Robert Morin and released in 2008. The film stars François Papineau as Vincent Lemieux, a wealthy financier on the run after facing fraud charges, who is driving through remote northern Quebec and recording a video message for his daughters.

The film was shot in the Baie-James region of Quebec over 10 days. The lead character was based on Vincent Lacroix, the Montreal financier implicated in the Norbourg scandal of 2005.

Morin received two Jutra Award nominations, for Best Director and Best Cinematography, at the 11th Jutra Awards in 2009.
