= Charles Antoine Perreault =

Canadian actor from Quebec

Charles Antoine Perreault is a Canadian actor from Quebec. He is most noted for his performance in the 2010 film A Life Begins (Une vie qui commence), for which he received a Jutra Award nomination for Best Actor at the 14th Jutra Awards in 2012.

He also appeared in the film The Fall of Sparta (La Chute de Sparte), and had supporting roles in the television series District 31 and Fugueuse.
