= Éveline Gélinas =

Canadian actress (born 1974)

- Born: 1974 (age 51–52)
- Occupation: actress
- Years active: 1990s-present
- Notable work: The Necessities of Life
- Spouse: Vincent-Guillaume Otis

Éveline Gélinas is a Canadian actress who grew up in Saint-Boniface, Quebec, near Shawinigan.

She was born in 1974 and graduated from Séminaire Sainte-Marie in 1991. She was nominated for a Genie Award for Best Supporting Actress for her role in The Necessities of Life (Ce qu'il faut pour vivre).

She is married to actor Vincent-Guillaume Otis.

== Career ==
Her credits include:

=== Television ===
- 1990-1992: Jamais deux sans toi (Lisa Tardif)
- 1992-1993: L'Or et le papier (Rose-Anne Miron)
- 1993-1999: Ent'Cadieux (Josette Fortin)
- 1994-1997: Les Héritiers Duval (Lisa Bard)
- 1998-2000: L'Ombre de l'épervier (Marie-Pierre)
- 2003-2017: L'Auberge du chien noir (Charlène, des Westerners)
- 2017: Ruptures (Emma)
- 2019: Victor Lessard (Ghislaine Corbeil)
- 2021: Confessions of a Hitman (Pauline Gallant)
- 2020-2022: District 31 (Alexandra Paradis)
- 2023: Alertes (Cindy Castonguay)

=== Theatre ===
- 2001 : Les Parapluies de Cherbourg (Geneviève Émery)
- 2002-2005 : L'homme de la Mancha (Aldonza/Dulcinea)
- 2003 : Kamouraska (Élisabeth D'Aulnières)
- 2003 : La nature même d'un continent (Billye)
- 2004 : Honey Pie (Honey Pie)
- 2004 : Les Fourberies de Scapin (Zerbinette)
- 2004 : Le peintre des madones ou la naissance d'un tableau (Marie-Paule)
- 2004 : Manic : Dans l'œil du Québec
- 2005 : La Tempête (Miranda)
- 2005 : Une ardente patience (Béatriz)
- 2007 : Don Juan (Charlotte)

=== Animated Series ===
- 2008 : Blaise le blasé : Violenne Voula (voice)
- 2009-10: The Dating Guy: Sam
