= All That You Possess =

- French: Tout ce que tu possèdes
- Directed by: Bernard Émond
- Written by: Bernard Émond
- Starring: Patrick Drolet
- Cinematography: Sara Mishara
- Production company: ACPAV
- Release date: 2012
- Country: Canada
- Language: French

All That You Possess (French: Tout ce que tu possèdes) is a Canadian drama film, released in 2012. Written and directed by Bernard Émond, the film stars Patrick Drolet as Pierre Leduc, a doctoral student and university lecturer in Quebec City who dreams of abandoning his academic career to translate the poetry of Edward Stachura.

The film garnered three nominations at the 1st Canadian Screen Awards, including Best Director and Best Original Screenplay nods for Émond and Best Actor for Drolet.
