= The Legacy (2009 film) =

- French: La Donation
- Directed by: Bernard Émond
- Written by: Bernard Émond
- Produced by: Bernadette Payeur; Marc Daigle
- Starring: Élise Guilbault; Jacques Godin
- Cinematography: Sara Mishara
- Edited by: Louise Côté
- Music by: Robert M. Lepage
- Production company: ACPAV
- Distributed by: Seville Pictures
- Release dates: August 7, 2009 (Locarno); November 6, 2009 (Canada)
- Running time: 96 minutes
- Country: Canada
- Language: French
- Budget: $CAN 4.2 million

The Legacy (French: La Donation) is a 2009 film directed by Bernard Émond. The film received the Special Grand Prize of Youth Jury and the Don Quixote Award of the Locarno International Film Festival. It also competed at the Toronto International Film Festival in September 2009 where it was awarded "Best Canadian Feature Film - Special Jury Citation

== Synopsis ==
The film is the third of a trilogy started with The Novena (La Neuvaine) in 2005 and Summit Circle (Contre toute espérance) in 2007, all directed by Bernard Émond.

Dr. Rainville (Jacques Godin), an aging country doctor with a deep attachment to his patients, is about to retire and is looking for a successor. Jeanne Dion (Élise Guilbault), an emergency room doctor from Montreal, agrees to go to a small town in Abitibi named Normétal to replace him for a few weeks, with no plans for an extended stay. When Dr. Rainville suddenly dies, Jeanne must decide if she'll take over the job, and its inherent responsibilities, for the long-term.

The film also stars Eric Hoziel, Sylvain Marcel, Angèle Coutu, Michel Daigle, Manon Miclette, Aubert Pallascio, and Danielle Fichaud.

== See also ==
- Health care in Canada
- Faith healing
- Secular theology
