= The Woman Who Drinks =

2001 film

- French: La Femme qui boit
- Directed by: Bernard Émond
- Written by: Bernard Émond
- Produced by: Bernadette Payeur
- Starring: Élise Guilbault; Luc Picard; Michel Forget; Fanny Mallette
- Cinematography: Jean-Claude Labrecque
- Edited by: Louise Côté
- Music by: Pierre Desrochers
- Production company: ACPAV
- Distributed by: Christal Films
- Release date: March 9, 2001
- Running time: 91 minutes
- Country: Canada
- Language: French

The Woman Who Drinks (French: La Femme qui boit) is a Canadian drama film, released in 2001. Written and directed by Bernard Émond, the film stars Élise Guilbault as a woman struggling with alcoholism. The film's cast also includes Luc Picard, Michel Forget, Fanny Mallette, Gilles Renaud and Patrice Robitaille.

== Synopsis ==
The story follows the final moments of a middle-aged woman who reflects on her past life as an alcoholic and the various problems caused by it.

== Accolades ==
Award	Year	Category	Nominee(s)	Result	Ref(s)
Genie Awards	2002 (22nd)	Best Actress	Élise Guilbeault	Won	
Genie Awards	2002 (22nd)	Best Supporting Actor	Michel Forget	Nominated	
Genie Awards	2002 (22nd)	Best Director	Bernard Émond	Nominated	
Genie Awards	2002 (22nd)	Best Art Direction/Production Design	André-Line Beauparlant	Nominated	
Genie Awards	2002 (22nd)	Best Costume Design	Sophie Lefebvre	Nominated	
