= Benoît Pilon =

Canadian film director and screenwriter (born 1962)

Benoît Pilon (French pronunciation: [bənwa pilɔ̃]; born July 27, 1962) is a francophone Canadian director and screenwriter particularly noted for his innovative films and documentaries on the human condition. He is also the co-founder of "Les Films de l'autre" productions, which produces, promotes and helps the development of independent films throughout North America.

== Career ==
Benoît Pilon earned a B.A. in film studies at Concordia University. He went on to form Les Films de l'Autre in 1988 with Manon Briand and others, an independent production co-op dedicated to auteur-driven films. His short 2003 short, Roger Toupin, épicier variété, won a Prix Jutra for best documentary, His debut feature, The Necessities of Life, which was written in collaboration with Bernard Émond, was a multi-award winner – four Genies, including best director for Pilon, and three Prix Jutras, including best picture and screenplay.

== Filmography ==
=== Director ===
- La Rivière rit - 1987
- Rap sur la « Main » - 1994
- Regards volés - 1994
- Rosaire et la Petite-Nation - 1997
- Réseaux - 1998, TV series
- 3 soeurs en 2 temps - 2003
- Roger Toupin, épicier variété - 2003
- Le temps des Québécois - 2004
- Nestor et les oubliés - 2006
- Des nouvelles du Nord - 2007
- Hôtel de la grève - 2007
- The Necessities of Life (Ce qu'il faut pour vivre) - 2008
- Trash (Décharge) - 2011
- Iqaluit - 2016
- The Vinland Club (Le Club Vinland) - 2020

=== Second Unit Director or Assistant Director ===
- Au chic resto pop (1990)
- The Pianist (1991)
- La Fourmi et le volcan, a.k.a. The Ant and the Volcano (1992)
- The Sex of the Stars (Le Sexe des étoiles) (1993)
- Jalna (1994) TV mini-series
- Picoti Picota (1995)
- Marguerite Volant (1996) TV mini-series

== Awards and recognition ==
- 2008: Special Grand Prize of Jury; Most popular film; Most popular Canadian film; Montreal World Film Festival, Genie Award for Best Achievement in Direction, The Necessities of Life (Ce qu'il faut pour vivre)
- 2003: Jutra Award, Best documentary, features;
  Bayard D'or for best documentary features at the Namur International Film Festival, Roger Toupin, épicier variété
- 1995: Golden Sheaf Award for Best Drama Over 30 mins, Regards volés
