= Bernard Émond =

Canadian director

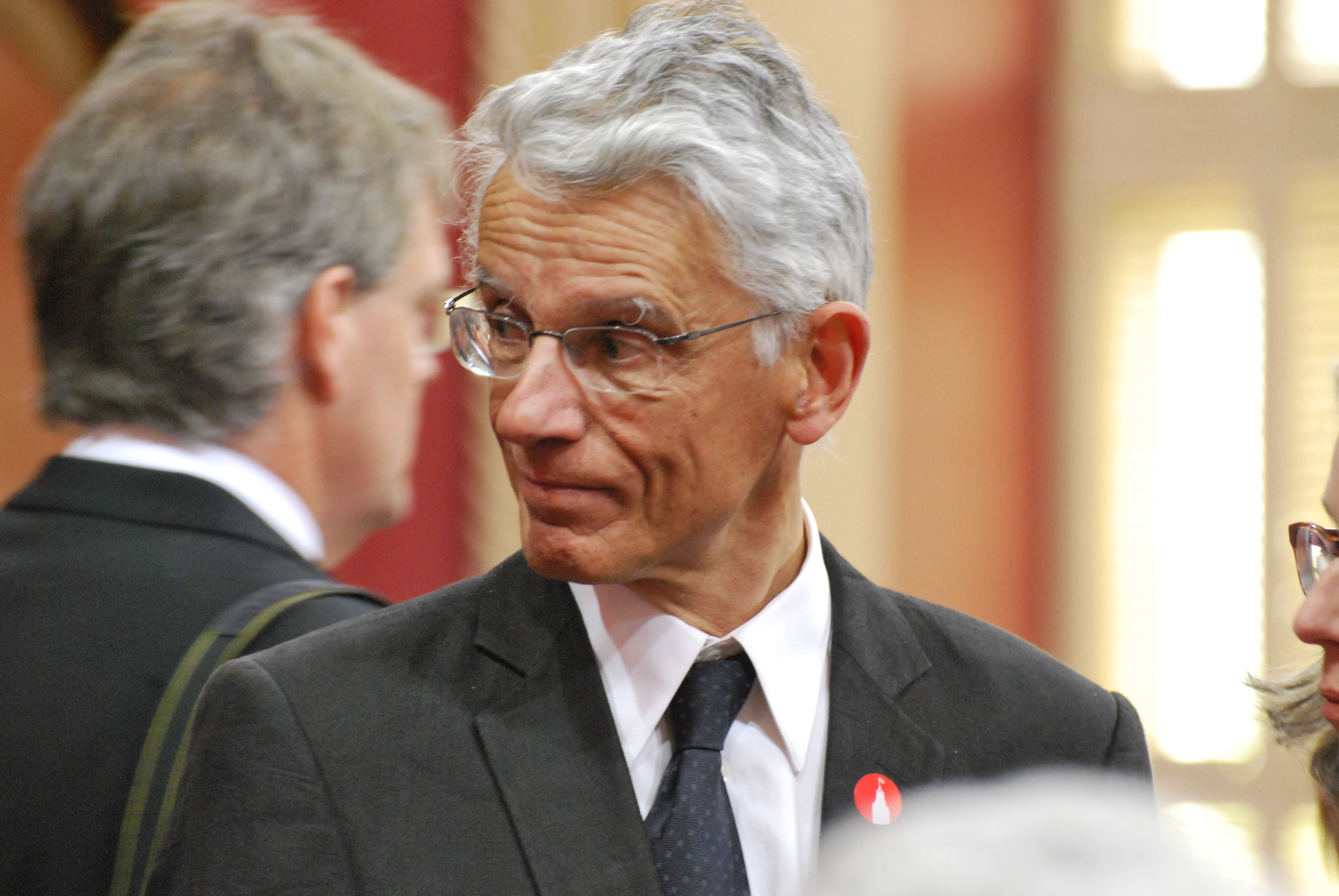
- Occupations: Film director, screenwriter
- Years active: 1990s–present
- Notable work: The Woman Who Drinks, Summit Circle, The Legacy

Bernard Émond is a Canadian director, screenwriter, novelist, and essayist working in the French language.

== Early life and education ==
Bernard Émond studied anthropology at university.

== Career ==
Émond lived for several years in the Canadian north, where he worked for the Inuit Broadcasting Corporation.

He began his film career making documentaries, later moving to feature-length films, all of which have been shot in Quebec. He is noted for the humanistic, sometimes spiritual depth of his films, in particular his trilogy of feature films (2007, 2009, 2012) based on the three Christian virtues, faith, hope, and charity. Other themes in his work include human dignity and frailty, and cultural loss. He describes himself as an agnostic and a "conservative socialist."

== Filmography ==
=== Director and writer ===
- 1992 - Ceux qui ont le pas léger meurent sans laisser de traces
- 1994 - L'instant et la patience
- 1995 - La Terre des autres
- 1997 - L'épreuve du feu
- 2000 - Le Temps et le lieu
- 2001 - The Woman Who Drinks (La Femme qui boit)
- 2003 - 8:17 p.m. Darling Street (20h17 rue Darling)
- 2005 - The Novena (La Neuvaine)
- 2007 - Summit Circle (Contre toute espérance)
- 2009 - The Legacy (La Donation)
- 2012 - All That You Possess (Tout ce que tu possèdes)
- 2015 - The Diary of an Old Man (Journal d'un vieil homme)
- 2018 - A Place to Live (Pour vivre ici)
- 2023 - A Respectable Woman (Une femme respectable)

=== Producer ===
- 1994 : Octobre (October)

== Awards and recognition ==
- 2009: Youth Jury Special Award and Environment is Quality of Life Award, Don Quixote Award, Locarno International Film Festival, The Legacy (La Donation; nomination, Golden Leopard.
- 2009: Genie Award for Best Screenplay, Original, The Necessities of Life (Ce qu'il faut pour vivre); Jutra Award, Best Screenplay
- 2008: Nomination, Jutra Award for Best Direction and Best Screenplay, Summit Circle (Contre toute espérance)
- 2006: Nomination, Jutra Award for Best Direction and Best Screenplay, The Novena (La Neuvaine)
- 2005: Prize of the Ecumenical Jury and Youth Jury Award: Environment is Quality of Life of the Locarno International Film Festival, The Novena (La Neuvaine); Nomination, Golden Leopard
- 2002: Nomination, Genie Award for Best Achievement in Direction, The Woman Who Drinks (La Femme qui boit)
- 2001: Nomination, Golden Bayard, Namur International Film Festival (Belgium), The Woman Who Drinks (La Femme qui boit)

== Publications ==
- 20h17 rue Darling, Montréal, (Québec), Canada, Lux Éditeur, 2005, 128 p. (ISBN 978-2-922494-96-9). English translation by John Gilmore, 8:17 pm, rue Darling, Toronto, (Ontario), Canada, Guernica Editions, 2014, 133 p. (ISBN 978-1-55071-846-1)
- Aani la bavarde, avec Fabien Merelle, Namur, Belgique, Éditions Didier Hatier, 2007, 77 p. (ISBN 978-2-218-92658-7)
- Aani la bavarde, PLAYBAC (March 29, 1999), French, ISBN 2218064006, ISBN 978-2218064005
- La Neuvaine : Scénario et regards croisés, Montréal, (Québec), Canada, Éditions Les 400 coups, 2008 (ISBN 978-2-89540-350-0)
- Il y a trop d'images : Textes épars 1993–2010, Montréal, (Québec), Canada, Lux Éditeur, 2011, 123 p. (ISBN 978-2-89596-118-5)
- Tout ce que tu possèdes : Scénario et regards croisés, Montréal, (Québec), Canada, Lux Éditeur, 2012, 144 p. (ISBN 978-2-89596-139-0)
- Camarade, ferme ton poste : Et autres textes, Montréal, (Québec), Canada, Lux Éditeur, 2017, 160 p. (ISBN 978-2-89596-250-2)
