= Robert Marcel Lepage =

Canadian musician and composer

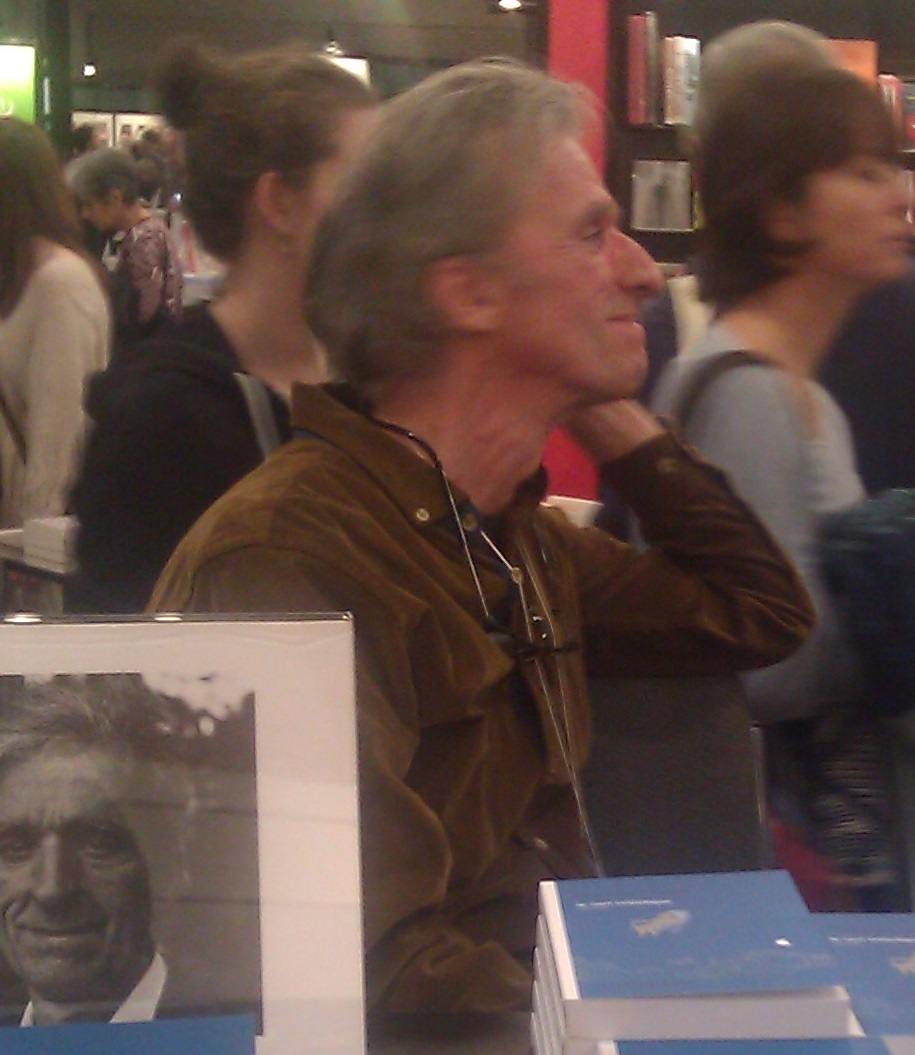
- Lepage at the Place Bonaventure in 2016.
- Born: July 5, 1951 (age 75); Montreal, Quebec, Canada
- Education: Université de Montréal
- Occupations: Musician, film score composer

Robert Marcel Lepage (born 5 July 1951) is a Canadian musician and film score composer.

Born in Montreal, Lepage trained in music at the age of 20, and learned to play the clarinet and saxophone. He performed with René Lussier and Pierre Hébert during the 1980s and 1990s.

He went on to write the scores for 150 films. He was nominated for the Genie Award for Best Score and the Jutra Award for Best Music for the 2008 film The Necessities of Life. Marc-André Lussier of La Presse positively reviewed Lepage's score for Iqaluit (2016) as "lyrical". In 2017, Lepage also received a Prix Iris nomination for Best Music for Before the Streets.

In his personal life, he has three children, Félix; Étienne Lepage, a playwright; and Florence, an artist.
