= Bernadette Payeur =

Canadian film producer (born 1952)

- Born: 1952 (age 73–74); La Prairie, Quebec
- Occupation: Film producer

Bernadette Payeur (born 1952) is a Canadian film producer.

Payeur was born in La Prairie, Quebec. She is known for producing Benoît Pilon's 2008 film The Necessities of Life and Sébastien Pilote's films The Salesman (2011) and The Dismantling (2013).

For The Necessities of Life, she was nominated for the Genie Award for Best Motion Picture. In 2015, she produced Pilon's film Iqaluit for Quebec's Association coopérative de productions audio-visuelles (ACPAV).
