= 14th Jutra Awards =

2012 Canadian film awards ceremony

The 14th Jutra Awards were held on March 11, 2012 to honour films made with the participation of the Quebec film industry in 2011.

Monsieur Lazhar lead the ceremony with nine nominations and seven awards, including Best Film, Best Director, Best Screenplay and two acting awards: Best Supporting Actor for Émilien Néron and Best Supporting Actress for Sophie Nélisse. Café de Flore won three awards from seven nominations, including Best Actress for Vanessa Paradis.

Coteau rouge received eight nominations, but went home empty ended, while Gerry received two awards from three nominations. Mario Saint-Amand, who was nominated for both of these films, Best Actor for Gerry and Best Supporting Actor for Coteau rouge, became the fourth performer to receive two acting nominations during the same ceremony, and the first since the acting categories expanded from four to five nominees.

Incendies won the award for Most Successful Film Outside Quebec, the only award it had lost the previous year, bringing its total to ten awards. It became only the second film to win ten awards, after C.R.A.Z.Y. won fifteen awards at the 8th Jutra Awards and a sixteenth at the 9th Jutra Awards.

== Winners and nominees ==
| Best Film | Best Director |
|---|---|
| Monsieur Lazhar — Luc Déry, Kim McCraw; Coteau rouge — Linda Pinet, André Forcier; Nuit #1 — Nancy Grant, Sylvain Corbeil; The Salesman (Le vendeur) — Bernadette Payeur, Marc Daigle; Starbuck — André Rouleau | Philippe Falardeau, Monsieur Lazhar; Anne Émond, Nuit #1; Micheline Lanctôt, For the Love of God (Pour l'amour de Dieu); Ken Scott, Starbuck; Jean-Marc Vallée, Café de Flore |
| Best Actor | Best Actress |
| Gilbert Sicotte, The Salesman (Le vendeur); Mohamed Fellag, Monsieur Lazhar; Patrick Huard, Starbuck; Charles Antoine Perreault, A Life Begins (Une vie qui commence); Mario Saint-Amand, Gerry | Vanessa Paradis, Café de Flore; Céline Bonnier, Coteau rouge; Catherine De Léan, Nuit #1; Julie Le Breton, A Life Begins (Une vie qui commence); Madeleine Péloquin, For the Love of God (Pour l'amour de Dieu) |
| Best Supporting Actor | Best Supporting Actress |
| Émilien Néron, Monsieur Lazhar; Antoine Bertrand, Thrill of the Hills (Frisson des collines); Nicolas Canuel, La Run; François Papineau, A Life Begins (Une vie qui commence); Mario Saint-Amand, Coteau rouge | Sophie Nélisse, Monsieur Lazhar; Sandrine Bisson, Fear of Water (La peur de l'eau); Anick Lemay, Thrill of the Hills (Frisson des collines); Louise Portal, The Happiness of Others (Le bonheur des autres); Sonia Vachon, A Sense of Humour (Le sens de l'humour) |
| Best Screenplay | Best Documentary |
| Philippe Falardeau, Monsieur Lazhar; André Forcier, Linda Pinet and Georgette Duchaîne, Coteau rouge; Léonardo Fuica, Demian Fuica and Martin Poirier, La Run; Sébastien Pilote, The Salesman (Le vendeur); Ken Scott and Martin Petit, Starbuck | The Heart that Beats (Ce cœur qui bat) — Philippe Lesage; At Night, They Dance (La nuit, elles dansent) — Isabelle Lavigne, Stéphane Thibault; Inside Lara Roxx — Mia Donovan; John Max, a Portrait — Michel Lamothe; Turtles Do Not Die of Old Age (Les tortues ne meurent pas de vieillesse) — Hind Benchekroun, Sami Mermer |
| Best Live Short | Best Animated Short |
| Trotteur — Arnaud Brisebois, Francis Leclerc; Hope — Pedro Pires; It Is Nothing (Ce n'est rien) — Nicolas Roy; Tabula Rasa — Matthew Rankin; Vacarme — Daniel Karolewicz | Sunday (Dimanche) — Patrick Doyon; Of Events (D'aléas) — Mathieu Tremblay; Paula — Dominic-Étienne Simard; Rivière au Tonnerre — Pierre Hébert; White Strawberry (Blanche fraise) — Frédérick Tremblay |
| Best Art Direction | Best Cinematography |
| Patrice Vermette, Café de Flore; Patrice Bengle, Coteau rouge; Marie-Ève Bolduc, Snow and Ashes; Danielle Labrie, Starbuck; Normand Sarazin, For the Love of God (Pour l'amour de Dieu) | Pierre Cottereau, Café de Flore; Bernard Couture, A Sense of Humour (Le sens de l'humour); Daniel Jobin, Coteau rouge; Michel La Veaux, For the Love of God (Pour l'amour de Dieu); Jean-François Lord, Snow and Ashes |
| Best Costume Design | Best Editing |
| François Barbeau, For the Love of God (Pour l'amour de Dieu); Michèle Hamel, Thrill of the Hills (Frisson des collines); Sophie Lefebvre, Coteau rouge; Ginette Magny, A Life Begins (Une vie qui commence); Mireille Roy, Snow and Ashes | Élisabeth Tremblay, Snow and Ashes; Jean-François Bergeron, A Sense of Humour (Le sens de l'humour); Demian Fuica, La Run; Éric Génois, On the Beat (Sur le rythme); Geoffroy Lauzon and Louise Sabourin, BumRush |
| Best Hair | Best Makeup |
| Denis Parent, Gerry; Martin Lapointe, A Life Begins (Une vie qui commence); Marcelo Nestor Padovani, Coteau rouge; Denis Parent, Thrill of the Hills (Frisson des collines); Ghislaine Sant and Frédéric Birault, Café de Flore | Julie Casault, Gerry; Kathryn Casault, Trash (Décharge); Christiane Fattori and Frédéric Marin, Café de Flore; Diane Simard, A Life Begins (Une vie qui commence); Kathy Kelso, Nathalie Trépanier and Micheline Trépanier, Funkytown |
| Best Original Music | Best Sound |
| Martin Léon, Monsieur Lazhar; Pierre Lapointe and Philippe Brault, The Salesman (Le vendeur); Louis Côté and Claude Lamothe, Snow and Ashes; FM Le Sieur, A Sense of Humour (Le sens de l'humour); Catherine Major, For the Love of God (Pour l'amour de Dieu) | Pierre Bertrand, Mathieu Beaudin, Sylvain Bellemare and Bernard Gariépy Strobl, Monsieur Lazhar; Sylvain Bellemare, Pierre Bertrand and Bernard Gariépy Strobl, Familiar Grounds (En terrains connus); Mario Auclair, Pierre-Jules Audet and Luc Boudrias, Fear of Water (La peur de l'eau); Yann Cleary, Claude Beaugrand and Stéphane Bergeron, Wetlands (Marécages); Pierre-Jules Audet, Arnaud Derimay and Bernard Gariépy Strobl, Starbuck |
| Most Successful Film Outside Quebec | Special Awards |
| Incendies — Denis Villeneuve; Café de Flore — Jean-Marc Vallée; Curling — Denis Côté; Monsieur Lazhar — Philippe Falardeau; The Salesman (Le vendeur) — Sébastien Pilote | Jutra Hommage: Paule Baillargeon; Billet d'or: Starbuck |

== Multiple wins and nominations ==
=== Films with multiple nominations ===
| Nominations | Film |
|---|---|
| 9 | Monsieur Lazhar |
| 8 | Coteau rouge |
| 7 | Café de Flore |
| 6 | For the Love of God (Pour l'amour de Dieu) |
| 6 | A Life Begins (Une vie qui commence) |
| 6 | Starbuck |
| 5 | The Salesman (Le vendeur) |
| 5 | Snow and Ashes |
| 4 | A Sense of Humour (Le sens de l'humour) |
| 4 | Thrill of the Hills (Frisson des collines) |
| 3 | Gerry |
| 3 | Nuit #1 |
| 3 | La Run |
| 2 | Fear of Water (La peur de l'eau) |

=== Films with multiple wins ===
| Wins | Film |
|---|---|
| 7 | Monsieur Lazhar |
| 3 | Café de Flore |
| 2 | Gerry |
