= Prix Iris for Best Screenplay =

Annual Canadian film award

The Prix Iris for Best Screenplay (French: Prix Iris du meilleur scénario) is an annual film award, presented by Québec Cinéma as part of its Prix Iris program, to honour the year's best screenplay in the Cinema of Quebec.

Until 2016, it was known as the Jutra Award for Best Screenplay in memory of influential Quebec film director Claude Jutra. Following the withdrawal of Jutra's name from the award, the 2016 award was presented under the name Québec Cinéma. The Prix Iris name was announced in October 2016.

Bernard Émond, Philippe Falardeau and Ken Scott are the most nominated screenwriters with five nominations each. Xavier Dolan became the first screenwriter to receive two nominations in the same year for Mommy and Tom at the Farm (Tom à la ferme) in 2015, a feat repeated in 2023 by Eric K. Boulianne for The Dishwasher (Le plongeur) and Viking.

== 1990s ==
Year	Writer(s)	Film	Ref
1999; 1st Jutra Awards
1999; 1st Jutra Awards	François Girard, Don McKellar	The Red Violin (Le violon rouge)	
1999; 1st Jutra Awards	Manon Briand	2 Seconds (2 secondes)	
1999; 1st Jutra Awards	Robert Lepage, André Morency	Nô	
1999; 1st Jutra Awards	Denis Villeneuve	August 32nd on Earth (Un 32 août sur terre)	

== 2000s ==
Year	Writer(s)	Film	Ref
2000; 2nd Jutra Awards
2000; 2nd Jutra Awards	Louis Bélanger	Post Mortem	
2000; 2nd Jutra Awards	François Bouvier, Marc Robitaille	Winter Stories (Histoires d'hiver)	
2000; 2nd Jutra Awards	Jean-Philippe Duval, Alexis Martin	Matroni and Me (Matroni et moi)	
2000; 2nd Jutra Awards	Léa Pool	Set Me Free (Emporte-moi)	
2001; 3rd Jutra Awards
2001; 3rd Jutra Awards	Denis Villeneuve	Maelström	
2001; 3rd Jutra Awards	Philippe Falardeau	The Left-Hand Side of the Fridge (La moitié gauche du frigo)	
2001; 3rd Jutra Awards	Michel Jetté	Hochelaga	
2001; 3rd Jutra Awards	Ken Scott	Life After Love (La vie après l'amour)	
2002; 4th Jutra Awards
2002; 4th Jutra Awards	André Turpin	Soft Shell Man (Un crabe dans la tête)	
2002; 4th Jutra Awards	Denis Chouinard	Tar Angel (L'ange de goudron)	
2002; 4th Jutra Awards	Pierre Falardeau	February 15, 1839 (15 février 1839)	
2002; 4th Jutra Awards	Catherine Martin	Marriages (Mariages)	
2003; 5th Jutra Awards
2003; 5th Jutra Awards	Jean-Philippe Pearson, Patrice Robitaille, Ricardo Trogi	Québec-Montréal	
2003; 5th Jutra Awards	Manon Briand	Chaos and Desire (La turbulence des fluides)	
2003; 5th Jutra Awards	Robert Morin	The Negro (Le nèg')	
2003; 5th Jutra Awards	Kim Nguyen	The Marsh (Le marais)	
2004; 6th Jutra Awards
2004; 6th Jutra Awards	Denys Arcand	The Barbarian Invasions (Les invasions barbares)	
2004; 6th Jutra Awards	Louis Bélanger	Gaz Bar Blues	
2004; 6th Jutra Awards	Bernard Émond	8:17 p.m. Darling Street (20h17 rue Darling)	
2004; 6th Jutra Awards	Ken Scott	Seducing Doctor Lewis (La grande séduction)	
2005; 7th Jutra Awards
2005; 7th Jutra Awards	Yves Pelletier	Love and Magnets (Les aimants)	
2005; 7th Jutra Awards	Marcel Beaulieu, Francis Leclerc	Looking for Alexander (Mémoires affectives)	
2005; 7th Jutra Awards	Pierre-Yves Bernard, Claude Legault	Dans une galaxie près de chez vous	
2005; 7th Jutra Awards	Chantal Cadieux, Ghyslaine Côté	The Five of Us (Elles étaient cinq)	
2006; 8th Jutra Awards
2006; 8th Jutra Awards	Jean-Marc Vallée, François Boulay	C.R.A.Z.Y.	
2006; 8th Jutra Awards	Bernard Émond	The Novena (La neuvaine)	
2006; 8th Jutra Awards	Luc Picard	Audition (L'audition)	
2006; 8th Jutra Awards	Ken Scott	The Rocket (Maurice Richard)	
2007; 9th Jutra Awards
2007; 9th Jutra Awards	Philippe Falardeau	Congorama	
2007; 9th Jutra Awards	Leila Basen, Alex Epstein, Patrick Huard, Kevin Tierney	Bon Cop, Bad Cop	
2007; 9th Jutra Awards	Stéphane Lapointe	The Secret Life of Happy People (La vie secrète des gens heureux)	
2007; 9th Jutra Awards	Robert Morin	May God Bless America (Que Dieu bénisse l’Amérique)	
2008; 10th Jutra Awards
2008; 10th Jutra Awards	Stéphane Lafleur	Continental, a Film Without Guns (Continental, un film sans fusil)	
2008; 10th Jutra Awards	Denys Arcand	Days of Darkness (L'âge des ténèbres)	
2008; 10th Jutra Awards	Bernard Émond	Summit Circle (Contre tout espérance)	
2008; 10th Jutra Awards	Claude Lalonde, Pierre Lamothe	The 3 L'il Pigs (Les 3 p'tits cochons)	
2009; 11th Jutra Awards
2009; 11th Jutra Awards	Bernard Émond, Benoît Pilon	The Necessities of Life (Ce qu'il faut pour vivre)	
2009; 11th Jutra Awards	Philippe Falardeau	It's Not Me, I Swear! (C'est pas moi, je le jure !)	
2009; 11th Jutra Awards	Fred Pellerin	Babine	
2009; 11th Jutra Awards	Guillaume Vigneault	Everything Is Fine (Tout est parfait)	

== 2010s ==
Year	Writer(s)	Film	Ref
2010; 12th Jutra Awards
2010; 12th Jutra Awards	Xavier Dolan	I Killed My Mother (J'ai tué ma mère)	
2010; 12th Jutra Awards	Jean-Philippe Duval	Through the Mist (Dédé, à travers les brumes)	
2010; 12th Jutra Awards	Bernard Émond	The Legacy (La donation)	
2010; 12th Jutra Awards	André Forcier, Linda Pinet	Je me souviens	
2010; 12th Jutra Awards	Ken Scott	Sticky Fingers (Les doigts croches)	
2011; 13th Jutra Awards
2011; 13th Jutra Awards	Denis Villeneuve, Valérie Beaugrand-Champagne	Incendies	
2011; 13th Jutra Awards	Robin Aubert	Crying Out (À l'origine d'un cri)	
2011; 13th Jutra Awards	Michael Konyves	Barney's Version	
2011; 13th Jutra Awards	Claude Lalonde	10½	
2011; 13th Jutra Awards	Ian Lauzon	Piché: The Landing of a Man (Piché, entre ciel et terre)	
2012; 14th Jutra Awards
2012; 14th Jutra Awards	Philippe Falardeau	Monsieur Lazhar	
2012; 14th Jutra Awards	André Forcier, Linda Pinet, Georgette Duchaîne	Coteau rouge	
2012; 14th Jutra Awards	Léonardo Fuica, Demian Fuica, Martin Poirier	La Run	
2012; 14th Jutra Awards	Sébastien Pilote	The Salesman (Le vendeur)	
2012; 14th Jutra Awards	Ken Scott, Martin Petit	Starbuck	
2013; 15th Jutra Awards
2013; 15th Jutra Awards	Kim Nguyen	War Witch (Rebelle)	
2013; 15th Jutra Awards	Xavier Dolan	Laurence Anyways	
2013; 15th Jutra Awards	Claude Gagnon	Karakara	
2013; 15th Jutra Awards	Ivan Grbovic, Sara Mishara	Romeo Eleven (Roméo Onze)	
2013; 15th Jutra Awards	Rafaël Ouellet	Camion	
2014; 16th Jutra Awards
2014; 16th Jutra Awards	Louise Archambault	Gabrielle	
2014; 16th Jutra Awards	Denis Côté	Vic and Flo Saw a Bear (Vic+Flo ont vu un ours)	
2014; 16th Jutra Awards	Martin Laroche	Fair Sex (Les manèges humains)	
2014; 16th Jutra Awards	Frédérick Pelletier	Diego Star	
2014; 16th Jutra Awards	Nathalie Saint-Pierre	Catimini	
2015; 17th Jutra Awards
2015; 17th Jutra Awards	Xavier Dolan	Mommy	
2015; 17th Jutra Awards	Xavier Dolan, Michel Marc Bouchard	Tom at the Farm (Tom à la ferme)	
2015; 17th Jutra Awards	Stéphane Lafleur	You're Sleeping Nicole (Tu dors Nicole)	
2015; 17th Jutra Awards	Robert Morin	3 Indian Tales (3 histoires d'indiens)	
2015; 17th Jutra Awards	Ricardo Trogi	1987	
2016; 18th Quebec Cinema Awards
2016; 18th Quebec Cinema Awards	Alexandre Laferrière, Maxime Giroux	Felix and Meira (Félix et Meira)	
2016; 18th Quebec Cinema Awards	Mathieu Denis	Corbo	
2016; 18th Quebec Cinema Awards	Anne Émond	Our Loved Ones (Les êtres chers)	
2016; 18th Quebec Cinema Awards	Céleste Parr	Gurov and Anna	
2016; 18th Quebec Cinema Awards	Marie Vien, Léa Pool	The Passion of Augustine (La passion d'Augustine)	
2017; 19th Quebec Cinema Awards
2017; 19th Quebec Cinema Awards	Louis Bélanger, Alexis Martin	Bad Seeds (Les mauvaises herbes)	
2017; 19th Quebec Cinema Awards	Bachir Bensaddek	Montreal, White City (Montréal la blanche)	
2017; 19th Quebec Cinema Awards	André Forcier, Linda Pinet	Kiss Me Like a Lover (Embrasse-moi comme tu m'aimes)	
2017; 19th Quebec Cinema Awards	Chloé Leriche	Before the Streets (Avant les rues)	
2017; 19th Quebec Cinema Awards	Kim Nguyen	Two Lovers and a Bear	
2018; 20th Quebec Cinema Awards
2018; 20th Quebec Cinema Awards	Nicole Bélanger	Cross My Heart (Les rois mongols)	
2018; 20th Quebec Cinema Awards	Darren Curtis	Boost	
2018; 20th Quebec Cinema Awards	Sophie Dupuis	Family First (Chien de garde)	
2018; 20th Quebec Cinema Awards	Robert Morin	Infiltration (Le problème d'infiltration)	
2018; 20th Quebec Cinema Awards	Gabriel Sabourin	It's the Heart That Dies Last (C'est le coeur qui meurt en dernier)	
2019; 21st Quebec Cinema Awards
2019; 21st Quebec Cinema Awards	Guillaume Corbeil, Yan Giroux	For Those Who Don't Read Me (À tous ceux qui ne me lisent pas)	
2019; 21st Quebec Cinema Awards	Eric K. Boulianne	Before We Explode (Avant qu'on explose)	
2019; 21st Quebec Cinema Awards	Geneviève Dulude-De Celles	A Colony (Une colonie)	
2019; 21st Quebec Cinema Awards	André Gulluni, Claude Lalonde	Origami	
2019; 21st Quebec Cinema Awards	Ricardo Trogi	1991	

== 2020s ==
Year	Writer(s)	Film	Ref
2020; 22nd Quebec Cinema Awards
2020; 22nd Quebec Cinema Awards	Sophie Deraspe	Antigone	
2020; 22nd Quebec Cinema Awards	Louise Archambault	And the Birds Rained Down (Il pleuvait des oiseaux)	
2020; 22nd Quebec Cinema Awards	Jean Barbe, Guillaume de Fontenay, Guillaume Vigneault	Sympathy for the Devil (Sympathie pour le diable)	
2020; 22nd Quebec Cinema Awards	Anne Émond	Young Juliette (Jeune Juliette)	
2020; 22nd Quebec Cinema Awards	Naomi Fontaine, Myriam Verreault	Kuessipan	
2021; 23rd Quebec Cinema Awards
2021; 23rd Quebec Cinema Awards	Sophie Dupuis	Underground (Souterrain)	
2021; 23rd Quebec Cinema Awards	Normand Bergeron, Benoît Pilon, Marc Robitaille	The Vinland Club (Le club Vinland)	
2021; 23rd Quebec Cinema Awards	Philippe Falardeau	My Salinger Year	
2021; 23rd Quebec Cinema Awards	Catherine Léger	Goddess of the Fireflies (La déesse des mouches à feu)	
2021; 23rd Quebec Cinema Awards	Daniel Roby	Target Number One	
2022; 24th Quebec Cinema Awards
2022; 24th Quebec Cinema Awards	Ivan Grbovic, Sara Mishara	Drunken Birds (Les oiseaux ivres)	
2022; 24th Quebec Cinema Awards	Tracey Deer, Meredith Vuchnich	Beans	
2022; 24th Quebec Cinema Awards	Louis Godbout, Normand Corbeil	A Revision (Une révision)	
2022; 24th Quebec Cinema Awards	Kaveh Nabatian	Without Havana (Sin la Habana)	
2022; 24th Quebec Cinema Awards	Fred Pellerin	The Time Thief (L'arracheuse de temps)	
2023; 25th Quebec Cinema Awards
2023; 25th Quebec Cinema Awards	Stéphane Lafleur, Eric K. Boulianne	Viking	
2023; 25th Quebec Cinema Awards	Eric K. Boulianne, Francis Leclerc	The Dishwasher (Le plongeur)	
2023; 25th Quebec Cinema Awards	Catherine Léger	Babysitter	
2023; 25th Quebec Cinema Awards	Rafaël Ouellet	Family Game (Arseneault et fils)	
2023; 25th Quebec Cinema Awards	Pascal Plante	Red Rooms (Les chambres rouges)	
2024; 26th Quebec Cinema Awards
2024; 26th Quebec Cinema Awards	Ariane Louis-Seize, Christine Doyon	Humanist Vampire Seeking Consenting Suicidal Person (Vampire humaniste cherche suicidaire consentant)	
2024; 26th Quebec Cinema Awards	Pier-Philippe Chevigny	Richelieu	
2024; 26th Quebec Cinema Awards	Monia Chokri	The Nature of Love (Simple comme Sylvain)	
2024; 26th Quebec Cinema Awards	André Forcier, François Pinet-Forcier, Renaud Pinet-Forcier, Laurie Perron, Jean Boileau	Ababooned (Ababouiné)	
2024; 26th Quebec Cinema Awards	Ricardo Trogi	1995	
2025; 27th Quebec Cinema Awards
2025; 27th Quebec Cinema Awards	Matthew Rankin, Ila Firouzabadi, Pirouz Nemati	Universal Language (Une langue universelle)	
2025; 27th Quebec Cinema Awards	Sophie Deraspe, Mathyas Lefebure	Shepherds (Bergers)	
2025; 27th Quebec Cinema Awards	Anne Émond	Peak Everything (Amour apocalypse)	
2025; 27th Quebec Cinema Awards	Catherine Léger	Two Women (Deux femmes en or)	
2025; 27th Quebec Cinema Awards	Philippe Lesage	Who by Fire (Comme le feu)	

== Multiple wins and nominations ==
=== Multiple wins ===
Wins	Screenwriter
2	Louis Bélanger
2	Xavier Dolan
2	Philippe Falardeau
2	Stéphane Lafleur
2	Denis Villeneuve

=== Three or more nominations ===
Nominations	Screenwriter
5	Bernard Émond
5	Philippe Falardeau
5	Ken Scott
4	Xavier Dolan
4	André Forcier
4	Robert Morin
4	Ricardo Trogi
3	Louis Bélanger
3	Eric K. Boulianne
3	Anne Émond
3	Stéphane Lafleur
3	Catherine Léger
3	Claude Lalonde
3	Kim Nguyen
3	Linda Pinet
3	Denis Villeneuve

== See also ==
- Canadian Screen Award for Best Screenplay
