= Renaud Pinet-Forcier =

Renaud Pinet-Forcier is a Canadian actor and screenwriter from Quebec. He is most noted as a co-writer of the 2024 film Ababooned (Ababouiné), for which he was a Prix Iris nominee for Best Screenplay at the 26th Quebec Cinema Awards.

The son of film director André Forcier and producer Linda Pinet, he was also credited as a cowriter of Forgotten Flowers (Les Fleurs oubliées).

His credits as an actor have included his father's films Acapulco Gold, The United States of Albert (Les États-Unis d'Albert), Je me souviens and Coteau Rouge.
