= Roy Dupuis =

Canadian actor (born 1963)

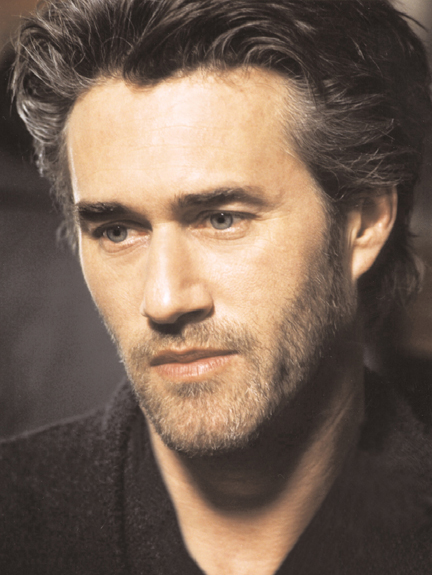
- Dupuis at the Agence Premier Rôle
- Born: Roy Michael Joseph Dupuis; April 21, 1963 (age 63); New Liskeard, Ontario, Canada
- Occupation: Actor
- Years active: 1985 – present
- Website: premierrole.com

Roy Michael Joseph Dupuis (French pronunciation: [ʁɔj dypɥi]; born April 21, 1963) is a Canadian actor best known outside Quebec for his role as counterterrorism operative Michael Samuelle in the television series La Femme Nikita. In Canada, specifically Quebec, he's known for numerous leading roles he's played in film. He portrayed Maurice Richard on television and in film and Roméo Dallaire in the 2007 film Shake Hands with the Devil.

== Early life and education ==
Dupuis was born in New Liskeard, Ontario to French-Canadian parents. From early infancy until he was 11 years old, Dupuis lived in Amos, Quebec in the Abitibi Regional County Municipality. Over the next three years he lived in Kapuskasing, Ontario, where he learned to speak English. His father was a travelling salesman for Canada Packers; his mother was a piano teacher. He has a younger brother and an older sister. When he was 14, after his parents divorced, his mother moved the family to Sainte-Rose, Laval, where he finished high school. After high school, he studied acting in Montreal, at the National Theatre School of Canada (L'École nationale de théâtre du Canada), from which he graduated in 1986.

== Personal life ==
Dupuis lives southeast of Montreal, in an 1840 farmhouse located on 50 acres (20 ha) of land which he bought in 1996 and which he has restored and renovated. He enjoys sports, particularly hockey, skydiving, and golf. His hobbies include astronomy and physics (his interests in high school). He learned to play the cello as a boy and, at times, still plays, sometimes in dramatic roles. In recent years, between television and film projects, he has been occupied with learning to sail; he owns a couple of sailboats, and he is custom-outfitting the larger aluminum-keeled vessel in preparation for extended ocean voyages.

== Career ==
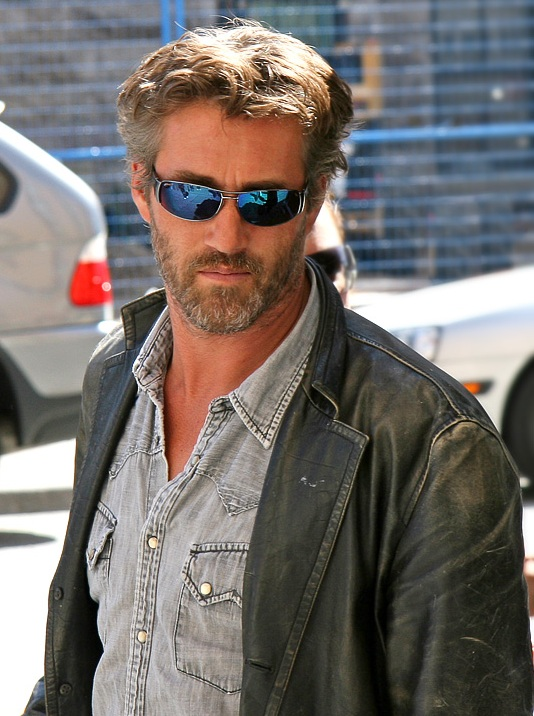
Dupuis at the 2007 Toronto International Film Festival

Dupuis is a celebrity in French-speaking areas of Canada and is also well known in anglophone areas due to his English-language and bilingual projects. He has performed in many theater productions, movies, and television series. Among the stage roles that he has performed so far are: Luc in Michel Marc Bouchard's Les Muses orphelines (The Orphan Muses), directed by André Brassard in 1985; Roméo in a Québécois adaptation of William Shakespeare's Romeo and Juliet (Roméo et Juliette), directed by Guillermo de Andrea in 1989; and Jay in Jean-Marc Dalpé's Le Chien (The Dog), Adrien in Jeanne-Mance Delisle's Un Oiseau vivant dans la gueule (A Live Bird in Its Jaws), and Lee in a Québécois version of Sam Shepard's True West, all three productions directed by Brigitte Haentjens, in 1987-89, 1990, and 1994, respectively.

Dupuis gained popularity in Quebec as Ovila Pronovost in the series Les Filles de Caleb (also known as Emilie) when it premiered on Radio-Canada (1990–91), and he co-starred as the journalist Michel Gagné in four seasons of Scoop (1992–95). He was introduced to the American public on television as Oliva Dionne in Million Dollar Babies (1994)--Les jumelles Dionne: La véritable histoire tragique des quintuplées Dionne (The Dionne "Twins": The True Tragic Story of the Dionne Quintuplets). In the United States, he also debuted on the big screen in such film roles as Becker in Screamers (1995) and as John Strauss in Bleeders (1996), also known as Hemoglobin (1997) in the UK. In 1997, he began appearing as "Michael Samuelle" in the television series La Femme Nikita on the USA Network." He was nominated for a MetroStar Award for his role as Ross Desbiens in Le Dernier Chapitre: La Vengeance (2003), the sequel to Le Dernier Chapitre (2002), both filmed simultaneously in dual-language versions broadcast in French and English on Radio-Canada and the CBC, respectively.

Dupuis's first appearance on film was in a 1987 short experimental work inspired by the 1926 avant-garde film Anémique Cinéma, by Marcel Duchamp and Man Ray, featuring the same title.

Among Dupuis' film performances are Yves, in Being at Home with Claude (1991; Cannes, Un Certain Regard 1992)--his first major screen role—directed by Jean Beaudin, adapted from a screenplay by Johanne Boisvert, based on the 1986 stage play by René-Daniel Dubois; and Kevin Barlow, in Manners of Dying (2004), the first feature film directed by Jeremy Peter Allen, adapted from his own screenplay based on the short story first published in the 1993 collection The Facts Behind the Helsinki Roccamatios and Other Stories by Yann Martel. His performance as Alexandre Tourneur in Looking for Alexander (Mémoires affectives) (2004), directed by Francis Leclerc, who co-wrote the screenplay with Marcel Beaulieu, received awards.

In The Rocket (Maurice Richard), directed by Charles Binamé (Séraphin: Heart of Stone) and released in late November 2005, Dupuis stars as French-Canadian ice hockey icon Maurice "Rocket" Richard, who played for the Montreal Canadiens from 1942–60, and whom he portrayed previously on Canadian television in 1997 and 1999. Dupuis' own experience playing hockey and his ability to perform on the ice on authentic period hockey skates were useful for this film, in which several professional hockey players were cast in supporting roles.

The film was nominated for the Jutra Award 2006 in fourteen categories, including Dupuis for Best Actor, but he did not win it. Leading the nominations for a Genie Award in thirteen categories, it won nine of the twenty-two awards on February 13, 2007, at the Carlu Event Theatre in Toronto, including Best Performance by an Actor in a Leading Role for Dupuis.

In December 2005, Dupuis completed filming That Beautiful Somewhere, based on the 1992 novel Loon by Bill Plumstead, its executive producer. It was set and filmed on location in North Bay, Ontario. The film, directed by Robert Budreau, is produced by Lumanity Productions. Its world premiere was on August 26, 2006, at the Montreal World Film Festival (August 24-September 4, 2006); it was presented at Cinéfest Sudbury International Film Festival (September 16–24, 2006), at the Calgary International Film Festival (September 22-October 1, 2006), and at other film festivals, as well as broadcast on Canadian pay cable television, before it was released commercially in Canada in April 2007.

On location in Kigali, Rwanda, in mid-June 2006, Dupuis began filming the dramatic feature film Shake Hands with the Devil, in which he performs the principal role of Lieutenant-General Roméo Dallaire, head of the United Nations Assistance Mission for Rwanda (UNAMIR) during the Rwandan genocide. The film is based on Dallaire's autobiographical book Shake Hands with the Devil: The Failure of Humanity in Rwanda. After two months in Kigali, filming continued in Halifax, Nova Scotia, in August 2006. Prior to its release, a "draft of the film" was screened as a courtesy by the producer, Laszlo Barna, to Paul Kagame, the President of Rwanda, and his cabinet, who found it emotionally very moving.

The film was a "special presentation" at the Toronto International Film Festival on 9 September 2007, and opened the 27th Atlantic Film Festival on September 13, 2007. Shake Hands with the Devil opened in theaters on September 28, 2007. For his performance as Dallaire, Dupuis won his second Jutra Best Actor award; in accepting it, "Dupuis dedicated his award to his mother, who died recently, as well as to Dallaire and the people of Rwanda."

In October 2006, along with Gabriel Byrne, Christopher Plummer, Max von Sydow, and Susan Sarandon, he filmed Emotional Arithmetic, directed by Paolo Barzman and adapted by Barzman and Jefferson Lewis from the novel by Canadian writer Matt Cohen (1942–1999), who had written several drafts of a screenplay adaptation himself before his death. Dupuis plays Benjamin Winters, the "embittered" son of Melanie Lansing Winters (Sarandon) and her husband, David Winters (Plummer). The film closed the 2007 Toronto International Film Festival on September 15, 2007.

In winter 2007, he participated in the improvisational short film directed by Francis Leclerc, entitled Revenir (Return), which was filmed and screened during the 11th edition of Festival Regard, a festival of short films, held in Saguenay, Quebec.

Later in 2007 and 2008, Dupuis began working on several new film projects, including: as Charles in Truffe, directed by Kim Nguyen, produced by Renée Gosselin and distributed by Christal Films, whose world premiere opens the Fantasia Film Festival in Montreal on July 3, 2008; as Jean-Paul Mercier in Mesrine: Killer Instinct; as Mr. Turcotte in A No-Hit No-Run Summer (Un été sans point ni coup sûr), a feature film about baseball set at the beginning of the 1960s adapted from the novel of that title by Marc Robitaille, directed by Francis Leclerc; as Scully in The Timekeeper (L'Heure de vérité), an English-language feature film directed by Louis Bélanger; as an Irishman named Liam Hennessy in André Forcier's Je me souviens and as another character named Charles in Sticky Fingers (Les doigts croches), directed by Ken Scott.

On March 18, 2008, after a fourteen year absence, Dupuis returned to the stage for a limited run as Ian in a French translation of Blasted, the controversial first play by British playwright Sarah Kane (1971–1999). Jean-Marc Dalpé's French version, Blasté, directed by Brigitte Haentjens for her company Sybillines Inc., also featured Céline Bonnier and Paul Ahmarani.

== Selected awards ==
- MetroStar: 1991: Comédien - Téléroman ou mini-série: Les Filles de Caleb
- Gémeaux: 1991: Meilleure interprétation dans un premier rôle masculin: série dramatique: Les Filles de Caleb
- Fipa d'Or: 1991: Festival International de Programmes Audiovisuels (Cannes): Best Actor: Les Filles de Caleb
- MetroStar: 1992: Comédien de téléroman ou mini-série québécoise: Emilie [English-dubbed version of Les Filles de Caleb]
- MetroStar: 2003: Rôle masculin/Télésérie québécoise: Le Dernier Chapitre: La Vengeance
- Genie: 2004: Meilleure interprétation dans un premier rôle masculin (Best Performance by an Actor in a Leading Role): Mémoires affectives
- Jutra: 2005: Meilleur acteur (Best Actor): Mémoires affectives
- Tokyo International Film Festival: 2006: Best Actor: The Rocket
- Genie: 2007: Meilleure interprétation dans un premier rôle masculin (Best Performance by an Actor in a Leading Role): The Rocket
- Jutra: 2008: Meilleur acteur (Best Actor): Shake Hands with the Devil
- Cinema on the Bayou Film Festival- Louisiana: 2020: Meilleur acteur (Best Actor in a Feature Film): Les Fleurs oubliées
- Toronto Film Critics Association Awards 2024: Finalist for Outstanding Performance in a Canadian Film, Rumours

== Selected stage performances ==
- Les Deux Gentilshommes de Vérone (The Two Gentlemen of Verona), by William Shakespeare (1985)
- La Passion selon Pier Paolo Pasolini (The Passion According to Pier Paolo Pasolini), a play by René Kalinsky based on Teorema (1985)
- Harold et Maude (Harold and Maude), trans. and adapt. by Jean-Claude Carrière of the play by Colin Higgins (1986)
- Toupie Wildwood, by Pascale Rafie (1987)
- Au pied de la lettre (At the End of the Letter), by André Simard (1987)
- Fool for Love, by Sam Shepard, trans. Michèle Magny (1987)
- Le Chien (The Dog), by Jean-Marc Dalpé (1987–1989)
- Les Muses orphelines (The Orphan Muses), by Michel Marc Bouchard (1988)
- Roméo et Juliette (Romeo and Juliet), by William Shakespeare, trans. Jean-Louis Roux (1989)
- Un Oiseau vivant dans la gueule (A Live Bird in Its Jaws), by Jeanne-Mance Delisle (1990)
- True West, by Sam Shepard, trans. Pierre Legris (1994)
- Blasted, by Sarah Kane, trans. as Blasté by Jean-Marc Dalpé (2008)

== Selected television performances ==
- Le Parc des Braves (The Park of the Brave) (1984–88; episode in 1987)
- Les enfants de la rue: Danny (Children of the Street: Danny) (1987)
- L'Héritage (The Inheritance) (1987–90; episode in 1987)
- L'amour avec un grand A [Also known as: Avec un grand A) (Love with a Capital L)] (1985–95): Hélène et Alexis (1988)
- Lance et Compte (He Shoots, He Scores) (1986–89): Tous Pour Un (All for One [1990]--"téléfilm" based on the TV series)
- Le Grand Jour (The Big Day) (1988)
- La Maison Deschênes (The House of Deschênes) (1987-89: episode in 1989)
- Les Filles de Caleb (Caleb's Daughters) (1990–91) [Also known as: Emilie]
- Scoop (1991–95)
- Emilie (1992) [English-dubbed version of Les Filles de Caleb]
- Blanche (1993) [Sequel to Les Filles de Caleb]
- Dark Eyes (Pilot) (1994)
- Million Dollar Babies (1994) [Also known as: Les jumelles Dionne: La véritable histoire tragique des quintuplées Dionne (The Dionne "Twins": The True Tragic Story of the Dionne Quintuplets)] (1994)
- Urgence (Emergency Call: Hospital Code 66) (1995)
- Heritage Minutes (Minutes du patrimoine) [Also known as: Historica Minutes or History by the Minute]: Louis Riel and Maurice "Rocket" Richard (1997)
- Les Beaux Dimanches (Beautiful Sundays): Maurice Richard: Histoire d'un Canadien. [Also known as: Maurice Rocket Richard Story (Canada: English title)] (1999)
- La Femme Nikita (1997–2001); dir. episode 506: "The Evil That Men Do" (2001)
- Le Dernier Chapitre (The Last Chapter) (2002)
- Le Dernier Chapitre: La Vengeance (The Last Chapter II: The War Continues) (2003)
- Les Règles du jeu: Roy Dupuis (The Name of the Game: Roy Dupuis) (2005)
- Un monde sans pauvreté: Agissons! (A World without Poverty: Take Action!) (2005) Public-service voiceover (in collaboration with Pascale Montpetit) sponsored by the Québécois section of Make Poverty History (Abolissons La Pauvreté) on behalf of Global Call to Action Against Poverty
- Les Rescapés Claude Desrosiers / Productions Casablanca (2009 to 2011)
- Une terre 1001 mondes Phile Beauchemin / Polivista Production (2013)
- Toute la vie Christophe L'Allier / Christophe (2019-2022)

== Selected filmography ==
- Anemic Cinema (Anémique cinéma) (1987)
- Exit 234 (Sortie 234) (1988, Short)
- Gaspard et fil$ (1988)
- In the Belly of the Dragon (Dans la ventre du dragon) (1989) as Jean-Marie
- How to Make Love to a Negro Without Getting Tired (Comment faire l'amour avec un nègre sans se fatiguer) (1989) as Pusher #2
- Jesus of Montreal (Jésus de Montréal) (1989) as Marcel Brochu
- The Singles Game (Le Marché du couple) (1990) as Barman
- Being at Home with Claude (1992) as Yves
- Entangled (1993) as Max
- Cap Tourmente (1993) as Alex O'Neil
- Chili's Blues (C'était le 12 du 12 et Chili avait les blues) (1994) as Pierre-Paul
- Screamers (1995) as Marshal Richard Cooper / Private Becker Screamer
- Waiting for Michelangelo (1995) as Thomas
- The Ideal Man (L'Homme idéal) (1996) as Christian
- Out in the Open (Aire Libre) (1996) as Aimé Bonpland
- Heads or Tails (J'en suis!) (1997) as Dominique Samson
- Bleeders (1997) as John Strauss
- Free Money (1998) as The Turk
- Séraphin: Heart of Stone (Séraphin : Un homme et son péché) (2002) as Alexis LaBranche
- The Barbarian Invasions (Les Invasions barbares) (2003) as Gilles Levac
- L'Invitation aux images (2003, documentary) as The Archivist
- Jack Paradise: Montreal by Night (Jack Paradise : Les Nuits de Montréal) (2004) as Jack Paradise
- Machine Gun Molly (Monica la mitraille) (2004) as Gérald 'Gerry' Simard
- Looking for Alexander (Mémoires affectives) (2004) as Alexandre Tourneur
- Manners of Dying (L'Exécution) (2004) as Kevin Barlow
- The Cop, the Criminal and the Clown (C'est pas moi, c'est l'autre!) (2004) as Vincent Papineau / Claude Laurin
- The United States of Albert (Les États-Unis d'Albert) (2005) as Jack Decker
- The Rocket (Maurice Richard) (2005) as Maurice Richard
- That Beautiful Somewhere (2006) as Detective Conk Adams
- Shake Hands with the Devil (2007) as General Romeo Dallaire
- Emotional Arithmetic (2007) as Benjamin Winters
- Return (Revenir) (2007)
- Truffles (Truffe) (2008) as Charles
- A No-Hit No-Run Summer (Un été sans point ni coup sûr) (2008) as Gilbert Turcotte
- Mesrine: Killer Instinct (2008) as Jean-Paul Mercier
- Je me souviens (2009) as Liam Hennessy
- The Timekeeper (2009) as Scully
- Sticky Fingers (2009) as Charles
- Coteau rouge (2011) as Éric Miljours
- Rock Paper Scissors (Roche papier ciseaux) (2013) as Vincent
- Cyanide (2013) as Joe
- Another House (L'autre maison) (2013) as Gabriel Bernard
- Stranger in a Cab (Ceci n'est pas un polar) (2014) as André Kosinski
- Footprints (L'Empreinte) (2015) as himself
- The Forbidden Room (2015) as Cesare
- The Sound of Trees (2015) as Régis Otis
- Where Atilla Passes (Là où Atilla passe…) (2015) as Michel
- Dead Leaves (Feuilles mortes) (2016) as Bob
- Kiss Me Like a Lover (Embrasse-moi comme tu m'aimes) (2016) as Narcisse St. Germain
- Barefoot at Dawn (Pieds nus dans l'aube) (2017) as Léo
- Forgotten Flowers (Les fleurs oubliées) (2020) as Albert Payette
- Brain Freeze (2021) as Dan
- Inès (2021) as Christian
- Rumours (2024) as Maxime Laplace

== See also ==
- Canadian cinema
- Cinema of Quebec
