= 26th Quebec Cinema Awards =

Awards show for Quebecois cinema in 2024

The 26th Quebec Cinema Awards was held on December 8, 2024, to honour achievements in the Cinema of Quebec in 2023 and 2024. The ceremony was broadcast by Noovo, and hosted by Phil Roy.

The artisans gala, presenting the craft awards not included in the broadcast ceremony, was held on December 4 and hosted by Mona de Grenoble.

== Overview of nominations ==
Ariane Louis-Seize's Humanist Vampire Seeking Consenting Suicidal Person (Vampire humaniste cherche suicidaire consentant) received a record breaking twenty-two nominations. It became the first film to receive seven acting nominations, the first to receive nominations in all five acting categories and the third film to receive three acting nominations in a single category, namely Best Supporting Actress. It received nominations in all eligible categories except Prix Michel-Côté which is determined by box-office results. Despite winning a leading eight awards during the ceremony, including Best Film and Best Screenplay, it failed to win any of its acting nominations.

The Nature of Love (Simple comme Sylvain) received fourteen nominations and won three awards, including Best Director. 1995 received eleven nominations, including Jean-Carl Boucher's and Sandrine Bisson's fourth nomination for playing the same character, following their nominations for 1981, 1987 and 1991. Sandrine Bisson became the first actress to win Best Supporting Actress thrice.

Richelieu received ten nominations and won three acting awards: Best Supporting Actor for Marc-André Grondin while Ariane Castellanos won both Revelation of the Year and Best Actress. She became the second person to win two acting awards during the same ceremony, following Hélène Florent's two awards during the 2022 ceremony. Solo also received ten nominations and won three awards, including Best Actor for Théodore Pellerin, who became the first actor to win in the Best Actor, Best Supporting Actor and Revelation of the Year categories. Coincidentally, all his winning performances were directed by Sophie Dupuis.

For his performances in both Humanist Vampire Seeking Consenting Suicidal Person and The Nature of Love, Steve Laplante became the first actor to receive two nominations in the same acting category, namely Best Supporting Actor. For his performances in both The Successor (Le successeur) and Richelieu, Marc-André Grondin became the ninth performer and sixth actor to receive nominations for both Best Actor and Best Supporting Actor during the same ceremony.

For the first time since the Revelation of the Year category was introduced, two actors — Félix-Antoine Bénard in Humanist Vampire Seeking Consenting Suicidal Person and Ariane Castellanos in Richelieu — received dual nominations for both that category and the lead acting categories. Castellanos also received a Best Casting nomination for Richelieu, making her the first person to receive nominations for both acting and casting in the same movie.

Sound mixer Luc Boudrias became only the third person, following haistylist Martin Lapointe and producer Marc Bertrand, to receive four nominations in a single category, namely Best Sound. Marie-Claude Lafontaine became the first person to win four consecutive awards, all in the Best Visual Effects category.

== Nominees and winners ==
Best Film	Best Director
Humanist Vampire Seeking Consenting Suicidal Person (Vampire humaniste cherche suicidaire consentant) — Jeanne-Marie Poulain, Line Sander Egede; 1995 — Marie-Claude Poulin; Ababooned (Ababouiné) — Roger Frappier, Louis Laverdière, Linda Pinet; The Nature of Love (Simple comme Sylvain) — Sylvain Corbeil, Nancy Grant, Elisha Karmitz, Nathanaël Karmitz; Richelieu — Geneviève Gosselin-G.; Ru — André Dupuy, Marie-Alexandra Forget; Solo — Étienne Hansez	Monia Chokri, The Nature of Love (Simple comme Sylvain); Pier-Philippe Chevigny, Richelieu; Sophie Dupuis, Solo; Ariane Louis-Seize, Humanist Vampire Seeking Consenting Suicidal Person (Vampire humaniste cherche suicidaire consentant); Ricardo Trogi, 1995
Best Actor	Best Actress
Théodore Pellerin, Solo; Félix-Antoine Bénard, Humanist Vampire Seeking Consenting Suicidal Person (Vampire humaniste cherche suicidaire consentant); Jean-Carl Boucher, 1995; Pierre-Yves Cardinal, The Nature of Love (Simple comme Sylvain); Marc-André Grondin, The Successor (Le Successeur)	Ariane Castellanos, Richelieu; Sophie Desmarais, Days of Happiness (Les Jours heureux); Magalie Lépine-Blondeau, The Nature of Love (Simple comme Sylvain); Mylène Mackay, Tell Me Why These Things Are So Beautiful (Dis-moi pourquoi ces choses sont si belles); Sara Montpetit, Humanist Vampire Seeking Consenting Suicidal Person (Vampire humaniste cherche suicidaire consentant); Nahéma Ricci, Hunting Daze (Jour de chasse)
Best Supporting Actor	Best Supporting Actress
Marc-André Grondin, Richelieu; Martin Dubreuil, Kanaval; Steve Laplante, Humanist Vampire Seeking Consenting Suicidal Person (Vampire humaniste cherche suicidaire consentant); Steve Laplante, The Nature of Love (Simple comme Sylvain); Francis-William Rhéaume, The Nature of Love (Simple comme Sylvain)	Sandrine Bisson, 1995; Marie Brassard, Humanist Vampire Seeking Consenting Suicidal Person (Vampire humaniste cherche suicidaire consentant); Sophie Cadieux, Humanist Vampire Seeking Consenting Suicidal Person (Vampire humaniste cherche suicidaire consentant); Pascale Montpetit, Ababooned (Ababouiné); Noémie O'Farrell, Humanist Vampire Seeking Consenting Suicidal Person (Vampire humaniste cherche suicidaire consentant)
Revelation of the Year	Best Screenplay
Ariane Castellanos, Richelieu; Félix-Antoine Bénard, Humanist Vampire Seeking Consenting Suicidal Person (Vampire humaniste cherche suicidaire consentant); Chloé Djandji, Ru; Shadi Janho, 1995; Chaïmaa Zineddine Elidrissi, Gamma Rays (Les Rayons gamma)	Ariane Louis-Seize and Christine Doyon, Humanist Vampire Seeking Consenting Suicidal Person (Vampire humaniste cherche suicidaire consentant); Pier-Philippe Chevigny, Richelieu; Monia Chokri, The Nature of Love (Simple comme Sylvain); André Forcier, François Pinet-Forcier, Renaud Pinet-Forcier, Laurie Perron and Jean Boileau, Ababooned (Ababouiné); Ricardo Trogi, 1995
Best Documentary	Best Short Documentary
Kite Zo A: Leave the Bones (Kite Zo A: Laisse les os) — Kaveh Nabatian, Joseph Ray, Zach Niles; After the Odyssey (Au lendemain de l'odyssée) — Helen Doyle; Days (Les Jours) — Geneviève Dulude-De Celles, Fanny Drew, Sarah Mannering; Scratches of Life: The Art of Pierre Hébert (Graver l'homme: arrêt sur Pierre Hébert) – Loïc Darses, Marc Bertrand; Wild Feast (Festin boréal) — Robert Morin, Cédric Bourdeau, Louis Laverdière, Stéphane Tanguay	Vibrations from Gaza — Rehab Nazzal; Afterwards (Après-coups) — Romane Garant Chartrand, Nathalie Cloutier; Outside Center — Eli Jean Tahchi, Béatrice Moukhaiber; Perséides — Laurence Lévesque, Line Sander Egede; The Sparkle (L'Artifice) — Isabelle Grignon-Francke, Patrick Francke-Sirois
Best Live Action Short Film	Best Animated Short Film
Summer of 2000 (Été 2000) — Virginie Nolin, Laurence Olivier, Estelle Champoux, Mylène Corbeil; Gaby's Hills (Gaby les collines) — Zoé Pelchat, Véronique Charbonneau; I Used to Live There — Ryan McKenna; Making Babies (Faire un enfant) — Eric K. Boulianne, Jean-Sébastien Beaudoin Gagnon, Johannie Deschambault; Mothers and Monsters — Édith Jorisch, Patrick Francke-Sirois, Isabelle Grignon-Francke	A Crab in the Pool (Un trou dans la poitrine) — Jean-Sébastien Hamel, Alexandra Myotte; Entropic Memory (Mémoire entropique) — Nicolas Brault; Families' Albums (Albums de familles) — Moïa Jobin-Paré; Return to Hairy Hill (Retour à Hairy Hill) — Daniel Gies, Emily Paige; Wild Flowers (Les Fleurs sauvages) — Rodolphe Saint-Gelais, Thierry Sirois, David Francke-Robitaille, Isabelle Grignon-Francke
Best Art Direction	Best Costume Design
Ludovic Dufresne, Humanist Vampire Seeking Consenting Suicidal Person (Vampire humaniste cherche suicidaire consentant); Jean Babin, Ababooned (Ababouiné); Marie-Hélène Lavoie, Ru; Colombe Raby, The Nature of Love (Simple comme Sylvain); Yola Van Leeuwenkamp, Tell Me Why These Things Are So Beautiful (Dis-moi pourquoi ces choses sont si belles)	Cédric Quenneville, Solo; Kelly-Anne Bonieux, Humanist Vampire Seeking Consenting Suicidal Person (Vampire humaniste cherche suicidaire consentant); Francesca Chamberland, Sisters and Neighbors! (Nos belles-sœurs); Sophie Lefebvre, Tell Me Why These Things Are So Beautiful (Dis-moi pourquoi ces choses sont si belles); Madeleine Tremblay, Ababooned (Ababouiné)
Best Cinematography	Best Cinematography in a Documentary
André Turpin, The Nature of Love (Simple comme Sylvain); Steve Asselin, 1995; André Dufour, Tell Me Why These Things Are So Beautiful (Dis-moi pourquoi ces choses sont si belles); Vincent Gonneville, Hunting Daze (Jour de chasse); Mathieu Laverdière, Solo; Jean-François Lord, Ru; Shawn Pavlin, Humanist Vampire Seeking Consenting Suicidal Person (Vampire humaniste cherche suicidaire consentant)	Mathieu Laverdière, Mother Saigon (Má Sài Gòn); Philippe Lavalette, After the Odyssey (Au lendemain de l'odyssée); Kaveh Nabatian, Kite Zo A: Leave the Bones (Kite Zo A: Laisse les os); Ernesto Pardo and François Messier-Rheault, The White Guard (La Garde blanche); Louis Turcotte, Scratches of Life: The Art of Pierre Hébert (Graver l'homme: arrêt sur Pierre Hébert)
Best Editing	Best Editing in a Documentary
Stéphane Lafleur, Humanist Vampire Seeking Consenting Suicidal Person (Vampire humaniste cherche suicidaire consentant); Marie-Pier Dupuis, Dominique Fortin and Maxim Rheault, Solo; Pauline Gaillard, The Nature of Love (Simple comme Sylvain); Amélie Labrèche, Richelieu; Yvann Thibaudeau, 1995	Elric Robichon, Wild Feast (Festin boréal); Annie Jean, After the Odyssey (Au lendemain de l'odyssée); Emmanuelle Lane, Days (Les Jours); Philippe Lefebvre, Scratches of Life: The Art of Pierre Hébert (Graver l'homme: arrêt sur Pierre Hébert); Kaveh Nabatian, Kite Zo A: Leave the Bones (Kite Zo A: Laisse les os)
Best Original Music	Best Original Music in a Documentary
Daniel Bélanger, Sisters and Neighbors! (Nos belles-sœurs); Viviane Audet, Robin-Joël Cool and Alexis Martin, Tell Me Why These Things Are So Beautiful (Dis-moi pourquoi ces choses sont si belles); Michel Corriveau, Ru; Pierre-Philippe Côté, Humanist Vampire Seeking Consenting Suicidal Person (Vampire humaniste cherche suicidaire consentant); Charles Lavoie, Solo	Mimi Allard, The White Guard (La Garde blanche); Pierre-Philippe Côté, Days (Les Jours); Liana El Amraoui and Jacob Desjardins, Eviction (Éviction); Jérôme Minière, The Eighth Floor (Le Huitième étage, jours de révolte); Lakou Mizik and Joseph Ray, Kite Zo A: Leave the Bones (Kite Zo A: Laisse les os)
Best Sound	Best Sound in a Documentary
Marie-Pierre Grenier, Simon Gervais, Luc Boudrias and Thierry Bourgault D'Amico, Humanist Vampire Seeking Consenting Suicidal Person (Vampire humaniste cherche suicidaire consentant); Sylvain Bellemare, Luc Boudrias, François Goupil and Stephen De Oliveira, Days of Happiness (Les Jours heureux); Samuel Gagnon-Thibodeau, Luc Boudrias and Laurent Ouellette, Hunting Daze (Jour de chasse); François Grenon, Julien Roig and Olivier Guillaume, The Nature of Love (Simple comme Sylvain); Patrice LeBlanc, Luc Boudrias and Jean Camden, Solo	Sylvain Bellemare, Hans Laitres and Daniel Capeille, The White Guard (La Garde blanche); Ilyaa Ghafouri, Shelley Craig and Thomas Sédillot, Scratches of Life: The Art of Pierre Hébert (Graver l'homme: arrêt sur Pierre Hébert); Sacha Ratcliffe, Hans Laitres, Joseph Ray and Roudie Rigaud Marcelin, Kite Zo A: Leave the Bones (Kite Zo A: Laisse les os); Catherine Van Der Donckt, Bruno Bélanger and Olivier Léger, After the Odyssey (Au lendemain de l'odyssée); Catherine Van Der Donckt, Isabelle Lussier, Richard Saindon and Guillaume Lévesque, Malartic
Best Hairstyling	Best Makeup
Daniel Jacob, Sisters and Neighbors! (Nos belles-sœurs); Nermin Grbic, Solo; Jean-Luc Lapierre, Humanist Vampire Seeking Consenting Suicidal Person (Vampire humaniste cherche suicidaire consentant); Jean-Luc Lapierre and André Duval, Tell Me Why These Things Are So Beautiful (Dis-moi pourquoi ces choses sont si belles); Marcelo Nestor Padovani, Ababooned (Ababouiné)	Marie Salvado, Solo; Catherine Brunelle, Bruno Gatien, Rémy Couture and Vicky Limkalan, We Are Zombies; Tania Guarnaccia, Humanist Vampire Seeking Consenting Suicidal Person (Vampire humaniste cherche suicidaire consentant); Dominique T. Hasbani, Ru; Catherine Lavoie, Sisters and Neighbors! (Nos belles-sœurs)
Best Visual Effects	Best Casting
Marie-Claude Lafontaine, Jean-François Ferland and Simon Beaupré, Humanist Vampire Seeking Consenting Suicidal Person (Vampire humaniste cherche suicidaire consentant); Julia Aubry, Evren Boisjoli, Ricardo Santillana and René Allegretti, Hunting Daze (Jour de chasse); Marie-Josée Huot and Alain Lachance, Ababooned (Ababouiné); Marie-Claude Lafontaine, Jean-François Ferland and Sébastien Chartier, Sisters and Neighbors! (Nos belles-sœurs); Marie-Claude Lafontaine and Sébastien Chartier, 1995	Tania Arana, Humanist Vampire Seeking Consenting Suicidal Person (Vampire humaniste cherche suicidaire consentant); Henry Bernadet, Marie-Anne Sergerie and Victor Tremblay-Blouin, Gamma Rays (Les Rayons gamma); Nathalie Boutrie and Geneviève Hébert, Ru; Ariane Castellanos, Richelieu; Karel Quinn, 1995; Annie St-Pierre, The Nature of Love (Simple comme Sylvain)
Most Successful Film Outside Quebec	Prix Michel-Côté
The Nature of Love (Simple comme Sylvain) — Monia Chokri, Sylvain Corbeil, Nancy Grant, Elisha Karmitz, Nathanaël Karmitz; Humanist Vampire Seeking Consenting Suicidal Person (Vampire humaniste cherche suicidaire consentant) — Jeanne-Marie Poulain, Line Sander Egede, Ariane Louis-Seize, Christine Doyon, Stéphanie Demers, Jean-Christophe J. Lamontagne; Manufacturing the Threat (Produire le menace) — Amy Miller; Red Rooms (Les Chambres rouges) — Dominique Dussault, Pascal Plante, Stéphanie Demers, Jean-Christophe J. Lamontagne; Richelieu — Pier-Philippe Chevigny, Geneviève Gosselin-G.	Sisters and Neighbors! (Nos belles-sœurs) — Yoann Sauvageau, Denise Robert, René Richard Cyr; 1995 — Patrick Roy, Marie-Claude Poulin, Ricardo Trogi; The Nature of Love (Simple comme Sylvain) — Patrick Roy, Monia Chokri, Sylvain Corbeil, Nancy Grant, Elisha Karmitz, Nathanaël Karmitz; Ru — Patrick Roy, Marie-Alexandra Forget, André Dupuy, Charles-Olivier Michaud, Jacques Davidts; Testament — Yoann Sauvageau, Denise Robert, Denys Arcand
Best First Film	Iris Tribute
Humanist Vampire Seeking Consenting Suicidal Person (Vampire humaniste cherche suicidaire consentant) — Ariane Louis-Seize, Christine Doyon; Hunting Daze (Jour de chasse) — Annick Blanc; Kanaval — Henri Pardo; Richelieu — Pier-Philippe Chevigny; When Adam Changes (Adam change lentement) — Joël Vaudreuil	Denis Villeneuve

== Multiple nominations ==
=== Films with multiple nominations ===
Nominations	Film
22	Humanist Vampire Seeking Consenting Suicidal Person (Vampire humaniste cherche suicidaire consentant)
14	The Nature of Love (Simple comme Sylvain)
11	1995
10	Richelieu
10	Solo
8	Ru
7	Ababooned (Ababouiné)
6	Sisters and Neighbors! (Nos belles-sœurs)
6	Tell Me Why These Things Are So Beautiful (Dis-moi pourquoi ces choses sont si belles)
5	Hunting Daze (Jour de chasse)
5	Kite Zo A: Leave the Bones (Kite Zo A: Laisse les os)
4	After the Odyssey (Au lendemain de l'odyssée)
4	Scratches of Life: The Art of Pierre Hébert (Graver l'homme: arrêt sur Pierre Hébert)
3	Days (Les jours)
3	The White Guard (La garde blanche)
2	Days of Happiness (Les jours heureux)
2	Gamma Rays (Les rayons gamma)
2	Kanaval
2	Wild Feast (Festin boréal)

=== Films with multiple wins ===
Wins	Film
8	Humanist Vampire Seeking Consenting Suicidal Person (Vampire humaniste cherche suicidaire consentant)
3	The Nature of Love (Simple comme Sylvain)
3	Richelieu
3	Sisters and Neighbors! (Nos belles-sœurs)
3	Solo
2	The White Guard (La garde blanche)
