= Acapulco Gold (2004 film) =

- Directed by: André Forcier
- Written by: André Forcier; Mark Krasnoff; Michel Maillot
- Produced by: Michel Maillot; Daniel Jobin
- Starring: Michel Maillot; Mark Krasnoff
- Cinematography: Daniel Jobin
- Edited by: Yan Desjardins; Linda Pinet
- Music by: Luc Raymond; Stéphane Girouard
- Production companies: Les Films du Paria; Les Films de la rue Marquette
- Release date: September 16, 2004 (TIFF)
- Running time: 83 minutes
- Country: Canada
- Language: French

Acapulco Gold is a Canadian comedy-drama mockumentary film, directed by André Forcier and released in 2004. The film stars Michel Maillot as Bob Garrigues, an actor who travels to Acapulco, Mexico for a meeting with film producer Hank Sturzberg (Mark Krasnoff), in an effort to sell his screenplay about the time he purportedly met Elvis Presley several years after the singer's death.

The cast also includes Julie Maillot, Renaud Pinet-Forcier, Geneviève Brouillette, Jean-François Chicoine, Richard Lespérance, Alejandro Moran, Charles-André Marchand, Mike McLaughin, Dor Cartier, Alexandrine Agostini, Jean Chevalier, Stella Maillot, Mariane Pinet-Forcier and Maxime Maillot.

The film represented Forcier's return to filmmaking after taking a hiatus following his 1998 film The Countess of Baton Rouge (La Comtesse de Bâton Rouge). It was entirely self-financed, and acted largely by Forcier's own family and friends, as a stopgap after complications with Telefilm Canada had delayed the completion of his real intended comeback, The United States of Albert (Les États-Unis d'Albert).

The film premiered in September 2004 at the 2004 Toronto International Film Festival, and was later screened at the Festival du nouveau cinéma in October, before going into commercial release in November. It was, however, one of the most poorly-received films of Forcier's entire career, garnering highly negative reviews and attracting only a few thousand paid viewers in commercial release.
