= Cardboard City (film) =

2025 Canadian drama film directed by André Forcier and Jean-Marc E. Roy

- French: Ville Jacques-Carton
- Directed by: André Forcier; Jean-Marc E. Roy
- Written by: André Forcier; Jean-Marc E. Roy
- Produced by: André Forcier; Jean-Marc E. Roy; Jeanne-Marie Poulain
- Starring: Jean-Marc Desgent; Pierre Curzi
- Cinematography: François Messier-Rheault
- Edited by: Justine Gauthier
- Music by: François Pinet-Forcier; Jo Millette
- Distributed by: Spira
- Release date: July 19, 2025 (Fantasia)
- Running time: 80 minutes
- Country: Canada
- Language: French

Cardboard City (French: Ville Jacques-Carton) is a Canadian docufiction film, directed by André Forcier and Jean-Marc E. Roy, and released in 2025. The film stars poet Jean-Marc Desgent as a fictionalized version of himself, who refuses to sell his run-down home in Longueuil, Quebec, to a real estate developer (Pierre Curzi) who wants to demolish the entire block to build a new, generic modern suburban housing development, with Desgent subsequently exploring the real history of Longueuil's 1969 annexation of Ville Jacques-Cartier.

The cast also includes Gaston Lepage, Charlotte Aubin, Sandrine Bisson, France Castel, Michèle Deslauriers and Mario Petrone as historic residents of the community in dramatic reenactments of the events.

The film premiered on July 19, 2025, at the 29th Fantasia International Film Festival, before opening commercially on September 5.
