= Marcelle Gauvreau =

Canadian naturalist and teacher

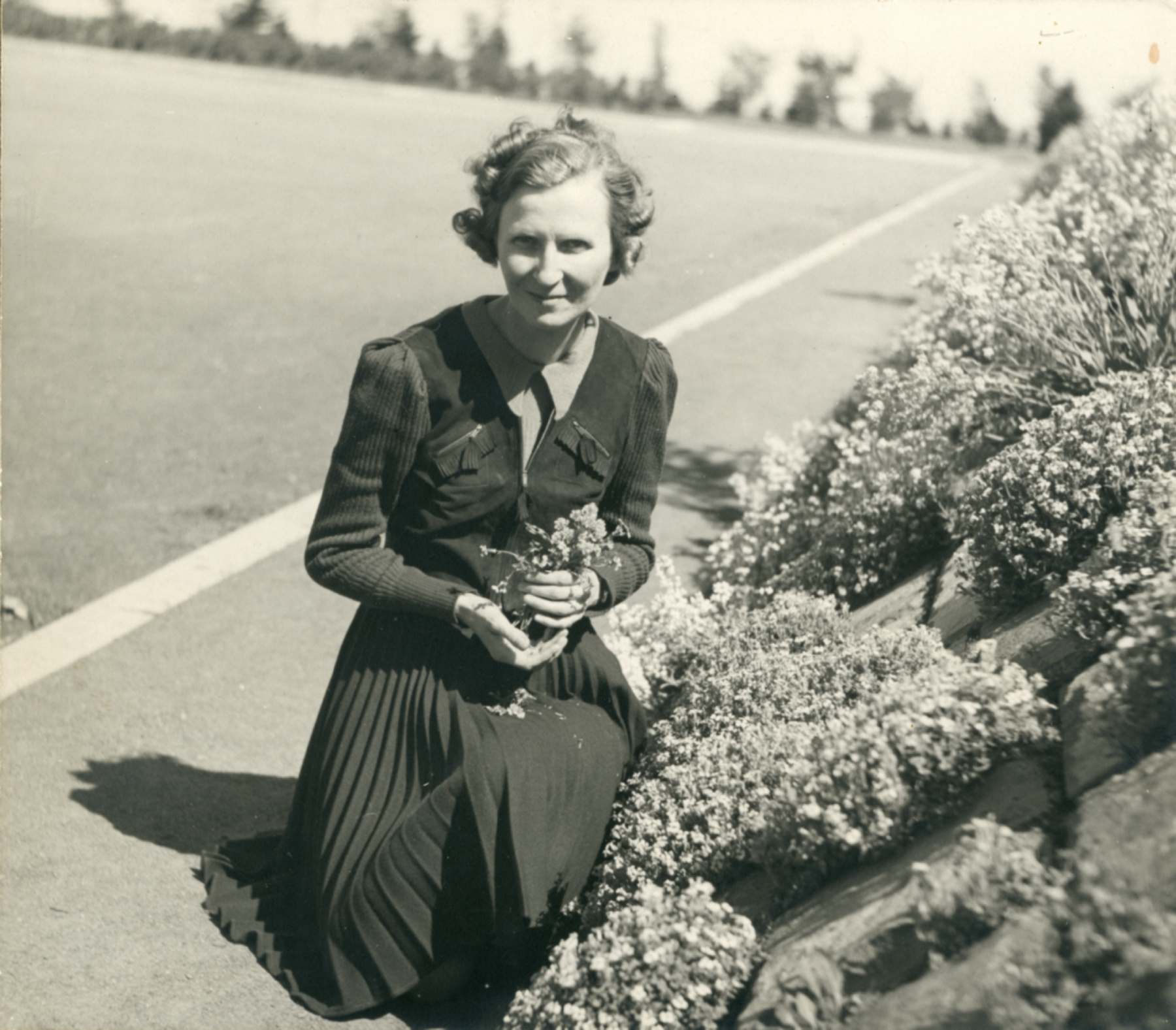
- Gauvreau in 1941
- Born: 28 February 1907; Rimouski, Quebec, Canada
- Died: 16 December 1968 (aged 61)
- Occupation: Botanist

Marcelle Gauvreau (28 February 1907 – 16 December 1968) was a Canadian botanist who took a special interest in natural history education for children. She founded a school to encourage young naturalists and published in both scientific journals and the popular press.

== Family and education ==
Marcelle Gauvreau was born in Rimouski, Quebec, to Joseph Gauvreau, a physician, and Augustine L'Arrivée. When Marcelle was two, her father became registrar of the College of Physicians and Surgeons of Quebec in Montreal, and the family moved to that city. Marcelle was the aunt and godmother of the filmmaker Claude Jutra.

Gauvreau received her early education at the Saint-Urbain Academy, Boulevard Academy, and the convent of Mont-Sainte-Marie. When she was ten, she came down with polio, which left her with a weak leg and caused her to miss half a year of schooling. In 1924, at the age of 17, she contracted tuberculosis, which left her with health issues for the rest of her life.

Gauvreau attended the University of Montreal for one year (1929–30). In 1930, the newspaper Le Devoir, encouraged by the prominent botanist Marie-Victorin Kirouac, launched a botanical contest. Gauvreau, who had already begun developing an interest in botany, entered the contest with a herbarium, which was considered excellent by the contest judges but excluded from the prizes because Gauvreau was then enrolled in the arts and philosophy division of the university rather than the natural sciences. The following year, Gauvreau moved over to the Botanical Institute for further study under Kirouac, who considered her one of the most brilliant students in the school. She got her degree in botany in 1932, and a degree in natural sciences the following year.

During this same period, she worked in the Botanical Institute library, and she earned a degree in library science from McGill University in 1935.

In 1933, she began graduate work on the marine algae of the St. Lawrence River under Jules Brunel. She obtained her M.S. in 1939, and her thesis was published in 1956. During her graduate studies, she also completed an exhaustive bibliography of Kirouac's writings and worked on the glossary and index of his magnum opus, La Flore laurentienne (The Laurentian Flora), the first comprehensive record of all plant species indigenous to southern Quebec.

== Career ==
=== Circles of Young Naturalists ===
In the 1930s, Gauvreau became involved with a new organization, the Circles of Young Naturalists (CYN), founded to encourage young scientists and supported by the Canadian Society for Natural History (CSNH). In 1932, she became the editor of a weekly chronicle of CYN activities published in the youth magazine L'Oiseau bleu. She continued there until the magazine folded in 1940. Between 1938 and 1954, she also wrote a weekly column about the CYN in Le Devoir. From 1938 to 1950, she was an officer of the CYN, and in 1956, she was elected president of the CSNH.

=== The School of Awakening ===
Around 1935, Gauvreau founded a unique educational institution, the School of Awakening (L'École de l'Éveil). Much as with the CYN, the goal was to awaken promising primary-school students to the natural sciences. Students attended for one hour a week, and the emphasis was on developing observational and field-work skills through direct contact with living plants and animals. From 1939 to 1957, classes were held at the Montreal Botanical Garden. Following a disagreement with city authorities, Gauvreau decided to move the school into the Cardinal-Léger Institute. Subsequently, several more branches were opened around the city and its suburbs. By 1960, more than 3500 students had passed through the school.

=== Radio and television ===
In 1943, Gauvreau had a radio program for young children on which she told stories about the natural world using the pseudonym "La Fée des fleurs" (Fairy of the Flowers). In 1963–1964, she was associated with the television series "Wonders of Nature".

=== Publications ===
Gauvreau published extensively, writing for both scientific journals and the popular press. Her works include two books for children on Canadian flora and fauna, her thesis on marine algae, and over 250 articles mainly for children.

== Legacy ==
The Marcelle-Gauvreau Ecological Reserve in Quebec was named in her honor.

She has been portrayed by Mylène Mackay in two films centring on her relationship with Kirouac, Forgotten Flowers (Les fleurs oubliées) by André Forcier in 2019 and Tell Me Why These Things Are So Beautiful (Dis-moi pourquoi ces choses sont si belles) by Lyne Charlebois in 2023.
