= France Castel =

Canadian singer, actor, broadcaster (b. 1944)

France Castel, née Bégin (born August 31, 1944 in Sherbrooke, Quebec) is a Canadian singer, actress and broadcaster.

== Music ==
Castel began in the music business by recording an album, Toi et moi amoureux, as a duo with Jean Beaulne of Les Baronets. The album spawned popular Quebec hits with "Sous notre toit" and the title track. For the next number of years, Castel recorded and performed mainly songs written by Christine Charbonneau, including "Du fil des aiguilles et du coton", "Château de sable", "Sur le pont", "Je le vois dans ma soupe", "Dominique", "Au fond de nous" and "L'amitié". Later in the 1970s, she began writing her own songs, inspired by blues music.

She recorded seven solo albums through the 1970s: Du fil, des aiguilles et du coton (1973), To One and All (1973), Je le vois dans ma soupe (1973), Moi j'veux pas déranger personne (1974), Quand on aime on a toujours 20 ans (1975), En corps à cœur (1976) and Noël disco (1977).

== Acting ==
In the 1970s, she began to take acting roles, starting with the television series Du Tac au Tac and Féminin pluriel. Her later television roles included the series Omertà and Sous un ciel variable.

In musical theatre, she played the role of Stella Spotlight in a 1980 production of Starmania. In 1986, she played Marlene Dietrich in a production of Normand Mongeon and Roch Harvey's Le Phenonène M. Her subsequent musical theatre roles included Betty Bird in Michel Tremblay's Demain matin, Montréal m'attend, and Janine in Marc Drouin and François Dompierre's I.

She appeared in films including An Imaginary Tale (Une histoire inventée), The Wind from Wyoming (Le vent du Wyoming), Karmina, The Countess of Baton Rouge (La Comtesse du Bâton Rouge), Heads or Tails (J'en suis!), Ice Cream, Chocolate and Other Consolations (Crème glacée, chocolat et autres consolations) and When I Will Be Gone (L'Âge de braise). At the 18th Genie Awards in 1997, she received two simultaneous nominations for Best Supporting Actress, for both Karmina and The Countess of Baton Rouge.

In 1999, she played Linda in a French-language production of Death of a Salesman at Montreal's Théâtre Jean-Duceppe.

== Broadcasting career ==
In the 2000s, she became a radio and television host, beginning as cohost with France Beaudoin of the daytime talk show Deux filles le matin for TVA. In 2005 she moved to Société Radio-Canada, the French-language arm of the Canadian Broadcasting Corporation, where she hosted the morning talk show Droit au cœur in 2005, cohosted the variety series Pour le plaisir with Michel Barrette from 2007 to 2014, and hosted a blues music program for Espace musique.

She published an autobiography, Ici et maintenant, in 2016.

In 2025, she was named the recipient of the Prix Guy-Mauffette for her body of work.

== Discography ==
=== Albums ===
- Du fil, des aiguilles et du coton (1973)
- To One and All (1973)
- Je le vois dans ma soupe (1973)
- Moi j'veux pas déranger personne (1974)
- Quand on aime on a toujours 20 ans (1975)
- En corps à cœur (1976)
- Noël disco (1977)

== Filmography ==
=== Film ===
Year	Film	Role	Notes
1988	Straight for the Heart (À corps perdu)	Michele	
1990	An Imaginary Tale (Une histoire inventée)	Alys	
1991	Four Stiffs and a Trombone (L'assassin jouait du trombone)	Florence	
1994	The Wind from Wyoming (Le vent du Wyoming)	Lizette Mentha	
1996	Karmina	Esméralda	
1996	The Countess of Baton Rouge (La Comtesse du Bâton Rouge)	Nuna Breaux	
1996	Cosmos	Waitress	
1997	Heads or Tails (J'en suis!)	Elisabeth Ballester	
1997	The Revenge of the Woman in Black (La Vengeance de la femme en noir)	Florence	
1998	The Sleep Room	Flo Langelben	
1998	When I Will Be Gone (L'Âge de braise)	Maureen	
2001	Ice Cream, Chocolate and Other Consolations (Crème glacée, chocolat et autres consolations)	Nicole	
2001	Karmina 2	Esméralda	
2004	So the Moon Rises (La lune viendra d'elle-même)	Francine	
2007	My Aunt Aline (Ma tante Aline)	Nicole	
2007	The 3 L'il Pigs (Les 3 p'tits cochons)	Lucille	
2016	Kiss Me Like a Lover (Embrasse-moi comme tu m'aimes)	Rose Lebleu	
2017	Hedgehog's Home	Narrator (French version)	
2017	Manivald	Mother	
2018	When Love Digs a Hole (Quand l'amour se creuse un trou)	Florence	
2019	Forgotten Flowers (Les fleurs oubliées)	Bourgeoise France	
2020	You Will Remember Me (Tu te souviendras de moi)	Madeleine Beauchemin	
2020	The Sticky Side of Baklava (La Face cachée du baklava)	Sylvie	
2021	Livrés chez vous sans contact	God	
2021	In the Jam Jar	Joan	
2025	The Furies (Les Furies)	Yvette	
2025	Cardboard City (Ville Jacques-Carton)	France	
2026	Tight Lettuce (Tissé serré)	Nana	

=== Television ===
Year	Title / Series	Role	Notes
1976	Du tac au tac	Geneviève	4 episodes
1978	Dominique		
1978-1982	Bye Bye		
1992	Scoop	Louise Duguay	13 episodes
1993	Scoop II	Louise Duguay	13 episodes
1996	Omerta, la loi du silence	Hélène Provost	
1997	Omertà II - La loi du silence	Hélène Provost	
2002	Lance et compte - Nouvelle génération	Patricia 'Mamma' Conti	
2005-2008	Ramdam	Janine L'Espérance	21 episodes
2010	Prozac, La Maladie Du Bonheur	Maman	9 episodes
2014-2015	Les Jeunes Loups	Paula Champagne	14 episodes
2016	Mes petits malheurs	Louise	
2018-19	L'Agent Jean: comment sauver le monde en 90 secondes	Martha (voice)	30 episodes
2024-	En résidence		13 episodes
