= Ababooned =

2024 Canadian comedy film

- French: Ababouiné
- Directed by: André Forcier
- Written by: Jean Boileau; André Forcier; Laurie Perron; François Pinet-Forcier; Renaud Pinet-Forcier
- Produced by: Roger Frappier; Louis Laverdière; Linda Pinet
- Starring: Éric Bruneau; Rémy Girard; Martin Dubreuil
- Cinematography: Nathalie Moliavko-Visotzky
- Production companies: Les Films du Paria; Max Films
- Distributed by: Fimoption International
- Release date: August 4, 2024 (Fantasia)
- Country: Canada
- Language: French

Ababooned (French: Ababouiné) is a Canadian comedy-drama film, directed by André Forcier and released in 2024. Set in the Faubourg à m'lasse district of Montreal, Quebec, in the 1950s, the film centres on a conflict between the Roman Catholic Church and a young team of baseball players.

The film features a large ensemble cast, including Éric Bruneau, Rémi Brideau, Rémy Girard, Maïla Valentir, Gaston Lepage, Lilou Roy-Lanouette, Martin Dubreuil, Pascale Montpetit, Mylène Mackay, Miguel Bédard, Devi Julia Pelletier, Donald Pilon, Réal Bossé, Pierre-Luc Brillant, Luc Senay, Jean-Marie-Lapointe, Hugolin Chevrette, Jean Boileau, Simon Lefebvre, Laurent-Christophe de Ruelle, Renaud Pinet-Forcier, Stéphane L’Écuyer, Émile Schneider and Noémie O'Farrell.

== Production ==
The film entered production in 2023.

Ababouiné had previously been the working title of Forcier's 1994 film The Wind from Wyoming (Le Vent du Wyoming).

== Distribution ==
The film had its world premiere on August 4, 2024, as the closing film of the 28th Fantasia International Film Festival, prior to going into commercial release on August 23. Forcier also received the Fantasia's Prix Denis-Héroux for his overall career achievements in Quebec cinema.

The film was also screened as the opening film of the Les Percéides film festival.

== Awards ==
Award / Film Festival	Date of ceremony	Category	Recipient(s)	Result	Ref.
Fantasia International Film Festival	2024	Audience Award, Canadian Films	André Forcier	Runner-up	
Prix Iris	December 8, 2024	Best Film	Roger Frappier, Louis Laverdière, Linda Pinet	Nominated	
Prix Iris	December 8, 2024	Best Supporting Actress	Pascale Montpetit	Nominated	
Prix Iris	December 8, 2024	Best Screenplay	André Forcier, François Pinet-Forcier, Renaud Pinet-Forcier, Laurie Perron, Jean Boileau	Nominated	
Prix Iris	December 8, 2024	Best Art Direction	Jean Babin	Nominated	
Prix Iris	December 8, 2024	Best Costume Design	Madeleine Tremblay	Nominated	
Prix Iris	December 8, 2024	Best Hairstyling	Marcelo Nestor Padovani	Nominated	
Prix Iris	December 8, 2024	Best Visual Effects	Marie-Josée Huot, Alain Lachance	Nominated	
