= Tell Me Why These Things Are So Beautiful =

2023 Canadian drama film

- French: Dis-moi pourquoi ces choses sont si belles
- Directed by: Lyne Charlebois
- Written by: Lyne Charlebois
- Produced by: Sylvie Lacoste; Veronika Molnar; Roger Frappier
- Starring: Alexandre Goyette; Mylène Mackay
- Cinematography: André Dufour
- Edited by: Yvann Thibaudeau
- Music by: Viviane Audet; Robin-Joël Cool; Alexis Martin
- Production company: Max Films
- Distributed by: Les Films Opale
- Release date: November 2, 2023 (FCIAT)
- Running time: 132 minutes
- Country: Canada
- Language: French

Tell Me Why These Things Are So Beautiful (French: Dis-moi pourquoi ces choses sont si belles) is a Canadian drama film, directed by Lyne Charlebois and released in 2023.

The film stars Alexandre Goyette as Marie-Victorin Kirouac, the Roman Catholic clergyman who was instrumental in the creation of the Montreal Botanical Garden, and Mylène Mackay as Marcelle Gauvreau, a young botany student with whom he had a longtime emotionally intimate but platonic friendship.

The cast also includes Rachel Graton, Francis Ducharme, Sylvie Moreau, Marianne Farley and Vincent Graton.

== Production ==
The film entered production in early 2023. It was shot principally in Montreal, although several days of location shooting were also undertaken in Cuba.

Mackay previously played Gauvreau in André Forcier's 2019 film Forgotten Flowers (Les fleurs oubliées), opposite Yves Jacques as Kirouac.

== Distribution ==
The film premiered on November 2, 2023, as the closing film of the Abitibi-Témiscamingue International Film Festival. It later screened in the Borsos Competition program at the 2023 Whistler Film Festival.

Commercial release is slated for June 2024.

== Awards ==
Award	Date of ceremony	Category	Recipient(s)	Result	Ref.
Abitibi-Témiscamingue International Film Festival	2023	Grand Prix Hydro-Québec	Lyne Charlebois	Won	
Prix Iris	December 8, 2024	Best Actress	Mylène Mackay	Nominated	
Prix Iris	December 8, 2024	Best Art Direction	Yola Van Leeuwenkamp	Nominated	
Prix Iris	December 8, 2024	Best Costume Design	Sophie Lefebvre	Nominated	
Prix Iris	December 8, 2024	Best Cinematography	André Dufour	Nominated	
Prix Iris	December 8, 2024	Best Original Music	Viviane Audet, Robin-Joël Cool, Alexis Martin	Nominated	
Prix Iris	December 8, 2024	Best Hairstyling	Jean-Luc Lapierre, André Duval	Nominated	
