= Maïla Valentir =

Maïla Valentir is a Canadian actress from Laval, Quebec. She is most noted for her performance as Angèle Moisan in the 2024 film Ababooned (Ababouiné), for which she received a Canadian Screen Award nomination for Best Lead Performance in a Comedy Film at the 13th Canadian Screen Awards in 2025.
