= François Pinet-Forcier =

François Pinet-Forcier is a Canadian sound editor and screenwriter from Quebec. He is most noted as a co-writer of the 2024 film Ababooned (Ababouiné), for which he was a Prix Iris nominee for Best Screenplay at the 26th Quebec Cinema Awards.

The son of film director André Forcier and producer Linda Pinet, he was also credited as a cowriter of Forgotten Flowers (Les Fleurs oubliées).

His sound credits have included the films Kiss Me Like a Lover (Embrasse-moi comme tu m'aimes), Sons of God, Des histoires inventées and Dead Cat (Chat mort).

He is the partner of Laurie Perron, one of the cowriters of Ababooned.
