= La Run =

- Directed by: Demian Fuica
- Written by: Demian Fuica; Léonardo Fuica; Martin Poirier
- Produced by: Léonardo Fuica
- Starring: Jason Roy Léveillée; Marc Beaupré; Pierre-Luc Brillant; Nicolas Canuel
- Cinematography: Jean-François Lord
- Edited by: Demian Fuica
- Music by: Marc Provençal
- Production company: Les Productions Fuica
- Distributed by: K Films Amérique
- Release date: August 23, 2011 (MWFF)
- Running time: 104 minutes
- Country: Canada
- Language: French

La Run is a Canadian crime drama film, directed by Demian Fuica and released in 2011. The film stars Jason Roy Léveillée as Guillaume, an academically gifted university student who agrees to participate in drug smuggling to help his father (Paul Dion) pay off gambling debts.

The cast also includes Marc Beaupré as Guillaume's best friend Manu, Nicolas Canuel as drug boss Rivière and Pierre-Luc Brillant as rival smuggler Boutch, as well as Martin Dubreuil and Nanette Workman in supporting roles.

The film was originally slated to be released theatrically in April 2011, but was delayed and ultimately premiered at the Montreal World Film Festival in August.

The film received three Jutra Award nominations at the 14th Jutra Awards in 2012, for Best Supporting Actor (Canuel), Best Screenplay (Demian Fuica, Léonardo Fuica and Martin Poirier), and Best Editing (Demian Fuica).
