= Linda Pinet =

Canadian screenwriter and film producer

Linda Pinet is a Canadian screenwriter and film producer, most noted for her collaborations with her husband André Forcier as a co-producer and co-writer of many of his films.

She began her career as a film editor, including on Forcier's Acapulco Gold, before her first full cowriting credit on The United States of Albert (Les États-Unis d'Albert). and has had writing and/or production credits on every Forcier film thereafter. She and Forcier cofounded the independent film studio Les Films du Paria.

She did not have a writing credit on Forcier's 2024 film Ababooned (Ababouiné), although she was a producer, and the couple's sons François Pinet-Forcier and Renaud Pinet-Forcier were co-writers of the film.

== Filmography ==
- 2004: Acapulco Gold – editor
- 2005: The United States of Albert (Les États-Unis d'Albert) – writer
- 2007: Happiness Bound (Un cri au bonheur) - editor
- 2009: Je me souviens – producer, writer, editor
- 2011: Coteau Rouge – producer, writer
- 2016: Kiss Me Like a Lover (Embrasse-moi comme tu m'aimes) – producer, writer
- 2019: Forgotten Flowers (Les fleurs oubliées) – producer, writer
- 2024: Ababooned (Ababouiné) – producer

== Awards ==
Award	Date	Category	Film	Result	Ref(s)
Prix Jutra/Iris	2010	Best Screenplay	Je me souviens	Nominated	
Prix Jutra/Iris	2010	Best Editing	Je me souviens	Nominated	
Prix Jutra/Iris	2014	Best Film	Coteau rouge	Nominated	
Prix Jutra/Iris	2014	Best Screenplay	Coteau rouge	Nominated	
Prix Jutra/Iris	2017	Best Screenplay	Kiss Me Like a Lover (Embrasse-moi comme tu m'aimes)	Nominated	
Prix Jutra/Iris	2024	Best Film	Ababooned (Ababouiné)	Nominated	
