= Christine Doyon =

Canadian screenwriter

Christine Doyon is a Canadian screenwriter from Quebec. With Ariane Louis-Seize, Doyon co-wrote the award-winning film Humanist Vampire Seeking Consenting Suicidal Person (Vampire humaniste cherche suicidaire consentant).

== Career ==
A graduate of the Université du Québec à Montréal and the Institut national de l'image et du son, she first became widely known for the 2013 web series Michaëlle en sacrament, about a woman who becomes her grandmother's caretaker after her grandmother is diagnosed with Alzheimer's disease. She also subsequently wrote the short films Chaloupe, Tortellini and Night Crosser (Sang papier), and the web series Germain s'éteint.

Doyon is most noted as co-writer of the film Humanist Vampire Seeking Consenting Suicidal Person (Vampire humaniste cherche suicidaire consentant), for which she and Ariane Louis-Seize won the Canadian Screen Award for Best Original Screenplay at the 12th Canadian Screen Awards, and the Prix Iris for Best Screenplay at the 26th Quebec Cinema Awards.
