= The Choice of a People =

1985 Canadian documentary film

- French: Le Choix d'un peuple
- Directed by: Hugues Mignault
- Written by: Bernard Lalonde; Hugues Mignault; Michel Pratt; Jean Saulnier
- Produced by: Bernard Lalonde
- Cinematography: Marc Bergeron, Carl Brubacher, Michel Caron, Bruno Carrière, Louis de Ernsted, André Gagnon, François Gill, James Gray, Daniel Jobin, Richard Lavoie, Maurice Roy, Marc Tardif, Robert Vanherweghem
- Edited by: Jean Saulnier
- Music by: Marc O'Farrell
- Production company: Les Films de la Rive
- Distributed by: Cinéma Libre
- Release date: August 30, 1985 (MWFF)
- Running time: 100 minutes
- Country: Canada
- Language: French

The Choice of a People (French: Le Choix d'un peuple) is a Canadian documentary film directed by Hugues Mignault and released in 1985. The film recounts the events of the 1980 Quebec referendum, presenting perspective from both the Yes and No sides.

It film premiered on August 30, 1985, at the Montreal World Film Festival.

The film was shortlisted for Best Documentary Film at the 7th Genie Awards in 1986.
