= André Dufour =

André Dufour is a Canadian cinematographer from Quebec. He is most noted for his work on the film Tell Me Why These Things Are So Beautiful (Dis-moi pourquoi ces choses sont si belles), for which he received a Prix Iris nomination for Best Cinematography at the 26th Quebec Cinema Awards in 2024.

Tell Me Why was his first cinematography credit on a feature film. He previously worked on television series including Mémoires vives, Conséquences and Troubled Waters (Les Eaux turbulentes), and was a camera operator on Borderline, A No-Hit No-Run Summer (Un été sans point ni coup sûr) and Les Hauts et les bas de Sophie Paquin.
