= The Dismantling =

2013 film

- French: Le Démantèlement
- Directed by: Sébastien Pilote
- Written by: Sébastien Pilote
- Produced by: Bernadette Payeur; Marc Daigle
- Starring: Gabriel Arcand
- Cinematography: Michel La Veaux
- Edited by: Stéphane Lafleur
- Music by: Serge Nakauchi Pelletier
- Production company: ACPAV
- Release dates: 17 May 2013 (Cannes); 11 September 2013 (TIFF)
- Running time: 111 minutes
- Country: Canada
- Language: French
- Budget: C$3.1 million

The Dismantling (French: Le Démantèlement), also released in the United States as The Auction, is a 2013 Canadian drama film written and directed by Sébastien Pilote and starring Gabriel Arcand. The film follows a sheep farmer who decides to sell his farm to help one of his daughters. It premiered at Cannes Critics' Week, where it won the SACD Prize, and later received Canadian Screen Award nominations for Best Film, Direction and Lead Actor.

== Synopsis ==
Gaby is a sheep farmer who lives by himself on the family property. His two grown daughters live in the city. Devoted to his family, he decides to sell the farm after one daughter asks him for money to avoid losing her home.

== Cast ==
The cast includes:

- Gabriel Arcand as Gaby Gagnon
- Gilles Renaud as the accountant friend
- Lucie Laurier as Marie
- Sophie Desmarais as Frédérique
- Johanne-Marie Tremblay as Françoise
- Dominique Leduc as the neighbor
- Gabriel Tremblay as Le petit Bouchard
- Marc-Antoine Béliveau as the man at the shelter
- Normand Carrière as Léo Simard
- Claude Desjardins as the auctioneer
- Pierre-Luc Brillant as the care-home attendant
- Michel Daigle as the concierge

== Production ==
The film was written and directed by Sébastien Pilote and produced by the Association coopérative de productions audio-visuelles. Filming took place in September and October 2012 in Jonquière and the surrounding area. The film had an approximate budget of C$3.1 million.

Pilote said the film grew out of his interest in social changes, including the decline of small-scale farming. He also drew on Honoré de Balzac's Le Père Goriot, particularly its combination of social criticism and family conflict, and referred to Shakespeare's King Lear as another point of comparison for Gaby's relationship with his daughters.

== Reception ==
=== Awards and nominations ===
At the 2nd Canadian Screen Awards, the film was nominated for Best Film, while Sébastien Pilote was nominated for Direction and Gabriel Arcand was nominated for Lead Actor. It was also one of five films in competition for the 3rd Prix collégial du cinéma québécois.

=== Critical response ===
Filmdienst characterized the film as a subdued and sad drama. The review found that, beneath its plain family story, the film examines wider questions of social change, including tensions between rural and urban life, tradition and modernity, and different generations.

SRF described the film as a moving farewell to rural life, writing that its dramatic force came from Gabriel Arcand's lead performance and from the finesse and warmth of Sébastien Pilote's direction.

== Festival screenings ==
The film had its world premiere at Cannes Critics' Week on 17 May 2013, where it won the SACD Prize. It was later screened in the Contemporary World Cinema section at the 2013 Toronto International Film Festival.
