= Mommy Is at the Hairdresser's =

- French: Maman est chez le coiffeur
- Directed by: Léa Pool
- Written by: Isabelle Hébert
- Produced by: Lyse Lafontaine; Michel Mosca
- Starring: Céline Bonnier; Laurent Lucas; Marianne Fortier; Élie Dupuis; Hugo St-Onge-Paquin; Gabriel Arcand
- Cinematography: Daniel Jobin
- Edited by: Dominique Fortin
- Music by: Laurent Eyquem
- Distributed by: Equinoxe Films
- Release date: May 2, 2008
- Running time: 97 minutes
- Country: Canada
- Language: French
- Budget: $4.35 million

Mommy Is at the Hairdresser's (French: Maman est chez le coiffeur) is a 2008 drama directed by Léa Pool.

== Synopsis ==
The film takes place in the summer of 1966, in Beloeil, Québec, where a young girl named Élise is enjoying summer vacation. Suddenly her mother leaves her family to pursue her journalism career in London. Her urge to leave is triggered when she coincidentally listens in on a conversation between her husband and his male lover. In a society still entrenched by taboos on sexual orientation, the mother flees the situation, abandoning Élise and her two younger brothers behind, in their father's care. It's then that Élise becomes more aware of the dreams, sorrows, and lies of the people closest to her. Her brother Coco stubbornly seeks refuge in constructing a supercar, and the youngest, Benoît, plummets deep into his own internal world, retreating ever-further in the furnace room of their house. Élise's father is simply overwhelmed by the situation, unable to govern the domestic realm as well as his wife, he lacks her tact when dealing with Benoît's disability. And so Élise decides to take the helm of her drifting family in an attempt to save their future. With support from the silent comfort her mentor Monsieur Mouche offers, a deaf-mute figurine maker, and the wonders of nature around her, Élise is on the verge of experiencing a summer unlike any other.

== Production ==
The movie's plot is the autobiographical work of its screenwriter, Lyse Lafontaine. The director, Léa Pool, visits the theme of childhood, inspired by the colorful verses of French poet Jacques Prévert. She mentions in an interview for Le Devoir that Isabelle Hébert's loosely autobiographical script resonated with her own autobiographical movie, Emporte-moi. Her aim was to narrate the situation by using the logic and perspective of children, especially Élise, the eldest, who experiences the beginning of adolescence while trying to explain the events surrounding their mother's departure. It was important for Pool to present the story of children longing for their mother genuinely, without vilifying the father's character, all the while avoiding mawkish scenes. In order to better situate the story, set during the beginning of quebecan bourgeoisie, the movie's soundtrack features hits of the 1960s, including iconic songs by Joël Denis and Claude Léveillée. In addition to the theme of coming of age, the plot also involves mental health and LGBT issues, making Mommy Is At the Hairdresser's the recipient of several viewer's choice awards during festival screenings.

== Awards ==
- Vancouver Film Critics Circle, January 2009
  - Best Actress in Canadian Film – Marianne Fortier
- Soleure Festival des Journées de Soleure, January 2009
  - Viewer's Choice Award
- Goteborg International Film Festival, January 2009
  - Viewer's Choice Award
- 11th Jutra Awards, March 2009
  - Best Hairstyle – Martin Lapointe
  - Most recognized picture outside Québec – Léa Pool
- 29th Genie Awards, April 2009
  - Nomination - Best female lead - Marianne Fortier
  - Nomination - Best female co-star - Céline Bonnier
  - Nomination - Best artistic direction - Patrice Bengle
  - Nomination - Best costume design - Michèle Hamel
  - Nomination - Best scene montage - Dominique Fortin
  - Nomination - Best soundtrack - Laurent Eyquem
- Festival International Cinéma et Costumes de Moulins, June 2009
  - Best Wardrobe – Michèle Hamel
