= Forgotten Flowers =

2019 Canadian comedy film

- Film poster
- French: Les fleurs oubliées
- Directed by: André Forcier
- Written by: Jean Boileau; André Forcier; Renaud Pinet-Forcier; Linda Pinet; François Pinet-Forcier
- Produced by: Louis Laverdière; Linda Pinet; Jean-François Roesler
- Starring: Roy Dupuis; Yves Jacques; Juliette Gosselin; Christine Beaulieu; Mylène Mackay
- Cinematography: Nathalie Moliavko-Visotzky
- Edited by: Elisabeth Olga Tremblay
- Music by: André Forcier (as Robert Fusil); Jo Millette
- Production companies: Exogene Films; Les Films du Paria
- Distributed by: Filmoption
- Release date: September 16, 2019 (Cinéfest)
- Running time: 102 minutes
- Country: Canada
- Language: French

Forgotten Flowers (French: Les fleurs oubliées) is a Canadian comedy film, directed by André Forcier and released in 2019. The film stars Roy Dupuis as Albert Payette, an agronomist who has lived in seclusion making mead since becoming disillusioned with his former career, but whose life is turned upside down when the late Brother Marie-Victorin Kirouac (Yves Jacques) returns to earth to enlist his help in an environmental campaign to take down his former employer Transgenia over its line of toxic pesticides.

The film also stars Juliette Gosselin as Lili de Rosbil and Christine Beaulieu as Mathilde Gauvreau, a journalist and lawyer who also become involved in the campaign, and Mylène Mackay as Mathilde's ancestor Marcelle Gauvreau, a fellow botanist with whom Marie-Victorin had an emotional, but not physical, romantic relationship with prior to his death. Other cast members include Émile Schneider, Donald Pilon, Dorothée Berryman, Louis Champagne, Barbara Ulrich and France Castel.

The film had its theatrical premiere on September 16, 2019 at the Cinéfest Sudbury International Film Festival, before premiering commercially on October 25.

Mackay again played Marcelle in Lyne Charlebois's 2023 film Tell Me Why These Things Are So Beautiful (Dis-moi pourquoi ces choses sont si belles), a more conventional historical drama centred specifically on her relationship with Kirouac.
