= Élie Dupuis =

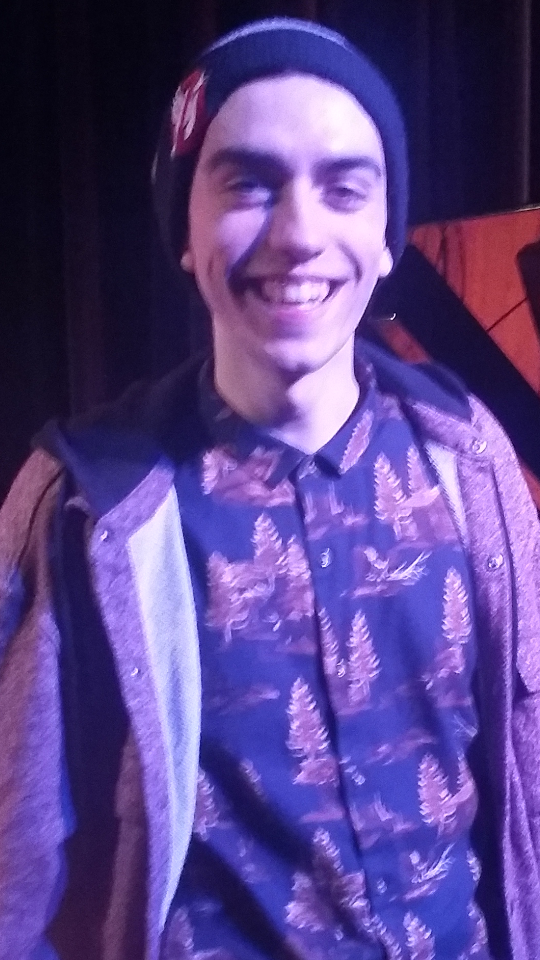
Élie Dupuis

Élie Dupuis is a Canadian musician, film and television performer from the Canadian province of Quebec, best known for his role in the Léa Pool film Mommy Is at the Hairdresser's (Maman est chez le coiffeur). His work as a performer has been recognized by popular Quebec entertainment media such as the French-language version of Canoe.ca.

== Biography ==
Dupuis was born September 8, 1994, and lives in Repentigny, Quebec, a suburb of Montreal. He began to play piano in 2004. In February 2007, Dupuis sent a self-recorded demo containing a medley of songs to the television program La Fureur ("The Furore") of the French-language Canadian television network Radio-Canada, following upon which he was then invited to sing live on the program.

== Career ==
After hearing his performance, filmmaker Léa Pool offered Dupuis one of the principal roles in her film Maman est chez le coiffeur. The film played at theatres throughout Quebec. Dupuis recorded two singles for the film's soundtrack: Bang Bang and The Great Escape, which received radio airplay in Quebec.

He was also approached by the television channel TFO which gave him parts in thirteen episodes of an educational television program called Cinémission.

In 2007, Dupuis was invited to take part in the telethon, "Téléthon Opération Enfant-Soleil," where he met singer Annie Villeneuve. They performed a duet performance in the televised production Annie Villeneuve Acoustique ("Annie Villeneuve unplugged"). Dupuis also appeared in performances at the theatre Hector-Charland, one of which was a fund-raiser for the "Fondation des Auberges du Cœur," an organization involved in providing shelter to homeless young people. In 2012, Dupuis performed at a 30th anniversary tribute honouring the career of Quebec singer Mario Pelchat, who described Dupuis as "a true revelation".

In 2012, he performed his first full show at Montreal's Place des Arts. He debuted two of his own compositions, along with interpretations of a range of pop standards, accompanied by two other musicians and featuring three guest performers. Dupuis is reported to be working on an album with Marc Langis, Celine Dion's bass player.

His first television role was in the series Le club des doigts croisés for television network Radio-Canada. His later television appearances include a 2008 performance on late-night talk show Bons Baisers de France and a 2012 episode of the long-running Quebec series L'auberge du chien noir.

== Discography ==
- Maman est chez le coiffeur – 2008 original soundtrack of the film Mommy Is at the Hairdresser's (Maman est chez le coiffeur) by Léa Pool
- Dernier Mot – 2018 EP
- 90 – 2020 EP

== Filmography ==
- Mommy Is at the Hairdresser's (Maman est chez le coiffeur) (2008) as Coco Gauvin
