= The Wind from Wyoming =

- French: Le Vent du Wyoming
- Directed by: André Forcier
- Written by: Patrice Arbour; André Forcier; Jacques Marcotte
- Produced by: Nardo Castillo; Claude Léger
- Starring: Sarah-Jeanne Salvy; France Castel; Céline Bonnier; Michel Côté; Marc Messier
- Cinematography: Georges Dufaux
- Edited by: Jacques Gagné
- Music by: Christian Gaubert
- Production companies: Eiffel Productions; Les Productions EGM; Transfilm
- Distributed by: Malo
- Release date: September 2, 1994 (FFM)
- Running time: 99 minutes
- Country: Canada
- Language: French

The Wind from Wyoming (French: Le Vent du Wyoming) is a Canadian black comedy film, directed by André Forcier and released in 1994.

The film centres on a dysfunctional family whose efforts at finding and keeping love become tangled up with a stage hypnotist performing at the local hotel. Daughter Léa (Sarah-Jeanne Salvy) is in unrequited love with Reo (Martin Randez), a boxer who has instead entered a relationship with her mother Lizette (France Castel), while her sister Manon (Céline Bonnier) has a crush on Chester Celine (François Cruzet), a writer she has never met, and her father Marcel (Michel Côté) remains hurt by Lizette's betrayal of him. They all enlist Albert the Great (Marc Messier) to hypnotize their respective love interests, but the effort backfires and forces them to deal with unintended consequences.

== Production ==
The film's original working title was Ababouiné. This was changed before the film's release, but was later recycled as the title of Forcier's 2024 film Ababooned (Ababouiné). The film is dually listed in Gerald Pratley's 2003 book A Century of Canadian Cinema, with separate entries for Ababouiné and The Wind from Wyoming.

== Distribution ==
The film premiered at the Montreal World Film Festival in 1994.

It was released on 4 screens on September 2, 1994 and grossed $18,578 in its opening 4-day weekend.

== Awards ==
At Montreal, the film won the awards for Best Canadian Film and the International Critics Prize. Forcier was shortlisted for Best Director at the 15th Genie Awards, At the Rendez-vous du cinéma québécois in 1995, Forcier won Best Screenplay and Salvy won the Revelation of the Year award for emerging performers; the film was also a nominee for Best Picture, but did not win.
