= Daniel Jobin =

Canadian cinematographer

Daniel Jobin (born 1949) is a Canadian cinematographer from Quebec. He is a two-time Genie Award nominee for Best Cinematography, receiving nods at the 12th Genie Awards in 1991 for Cargo and at the 17th Genie Awards in 1996 for Lilies, and a four-time Jutra/Iris Award nominee for Best Cinematography, receiving nominations at the 11th Jutra Awards in 2009 for Mommy Is at the Hairdresser's (Maman est chez le coiffeur), at the 12th Jutra Awards in 2010 for Je me souviens, at the 14th Jutra Awards in 2012 for Coteau rouge, and at the 18th Quebec Cinema Awards in 2016 for The Passion of Augustine (La Passion d'Augustine).

== Filmography ==
- A Woman in Transit (La Femme de l'hôtel) - 1984
- The Choice of a People (La Choix d'un peuple) - 1985
- Transit - 1986
- Marie in the City (Marie s'en va-t-en ville) - 1987
- Cargo - 1990
- Louis 19, King of the Airwaves (Louis 19, le roi des ondes) - 1994
- Lilies - 1996
- The Hanging Garden - 1997
- It's Your Turn, Laura Cadieux (C't'à ton tour, Laura Cadieux) - 1998
- Laura Cadieux II (Laura Cadieux...la suite) - 1999
- Island of the Dead - 2000
- Wedding Night (Nuit de noces) - 2001
- The Collector (Le Collectionneur) - 2002
- The United States of Albert (Les États-Unis d'Albert) - 2005
- Mommy Is at the Hairdresser's (Maman est chez le coiffeur) - 2008
- Je me souviens - 2009
- The Child Prodigy (L'Enfant prodige) - 2010
- Stay with Me (Reste avec moi) - 2010
- Coteau rouge - 2011
- Pink Ribbons, Inc. - 2011
- Love Project - 2014
- The Passion of Augustine (La Passion d'Augustine) - 2015
- Kiss Me Like a Lover (Embrasse-moi comme tu m'aimes) - 2016
