= Jean Boileau (screenwriter) =

Canadian actor and screenwriter

Jean Boileau (born 1959) is a Canadian actor and screenwriter from Trois-Rivières, Quebec. He is most noted as a co-writer of the 2024 film Ababooned (Ababouiné), for which he was a Prix Iris nominee for Best Screenplay at the 26th Quebec Cinema Awards.

He was previously credited as a cowriter of Forgotten Flowers (Les fleurs oubliées), and had supporting acting roles in both films. He was credited as a screenwriter on Martin Saulnier's short film La Chaîne, and was both writer and director of the short film La comtesse de Sainte-Cécile in 2024.

He has also written stage plays and short stories, and has published and exhibited photography.
