= Laurie Perron =

Canadian musician and screenwriter

Laurie Perron is a Canadian musician and screenwriter from Quebec. They are most noted as a co-writer of the 2024 film Ababooned (Ababouiné), for which they were a Prix Iris nominee for Best Screenplay at the 26th Quebec Cinema Awards.

Perron has been referred to with both female and gender-neutral pronouns in different sources.

As a musician they have played violin, cello and keyboards with the post-rock bands Guim Moro and Après l’Asphalte. With Alexandra Turgeon, they have cohosted ToutEs ou pantoute, a podcast about feminist and LGBTQ issues.

They are the partner of François Pinet-Forcier, one of the cowriters of Ababooned.
