= The Countess of Baton Rouge =

- French: La Comtesse de Bâton Rouge
- Directed by: André Forcier
- Written by: André Forcier
- Produced by: Roger Frappier
- Starring: Robin Aubert; Geneviève Brouillette; Isabel Richer; Frédéric Desager; Gaston Lepage
- Cinematography: André Turpin
- Edited by: Richard Comeau
- Music by: Michel Cusson
- Release date: 1997 (Canada)
- Running time: 94 minutes
- Country: Canada
- Language: French

The Countess of Baton Rouge (French: La Comtesse de Bâton Rouge) is a romantic comedy film by Canadian director André Forcier, released in 1997.

== Synopsis ==
The story begins in a contemporary Montreal theatre where a projectionist describes to director Rex Albert (Robin Aubert) that a ghostly spirit seems to be haunting his film. The story then flashes back to the 1960s when Rex was making his first film. One night he visits a freak show and meets Paula, a beautiful bearded lady (Geneviève Brouillette). For Rex it is love at first sight, so he is upset when she takes off to join a Cajun circus in Louisiana. A few months later, Rex races southward to become a human cannonball in the same circus. The story jumps back to the present to Rex's latest film, La Comtesse de Baton Rouge, a chronicle to his strange love affair with Paula. The film is another offbeat fantasy about characters that live on the margins of society from director André Forcier. The film's cast also includes Isabel Richer, David Boutin, Frédéric Desager, France Castel and Louise Marleau.

== Awards ==
The film garnered several Genie Award nominations at the 18th Genie Awards, including Best Actor (Aubert), Best Supporting Actor (Desager), Best Supporting Actress (Castel) and Best Director (Forcier).
