= Je me souviens (2009 film) =

- Directed by: André Forcier
- Written by: André Forcier; Linda Pinet
- Produced by: Linda Pinet; Pascal Maeder; André Forcier
- Starring: Céline Bonnier; Roy Dupuis; Rémy Girard; Michel Barrette
- Cinematography: Daniel Jobin
- Edited by: Linda Pinet
- Production company: Films du Paria
- Distributed by: Atopia
- Release date: March 6, 2009
- Running time: 86 minutes
- Country: Canada
- Language: French

Je me souviens is a 2009 French-Canadian (Quebec) film written and directed by André Forcier and produced by Les Films du Paria.

The film is set in 1949, when Maurice Duplessis was premier of Quebec and in the context of a union election in the Abitibi region.
