= Mylène Mackay =

Canadian actress (born 1987)

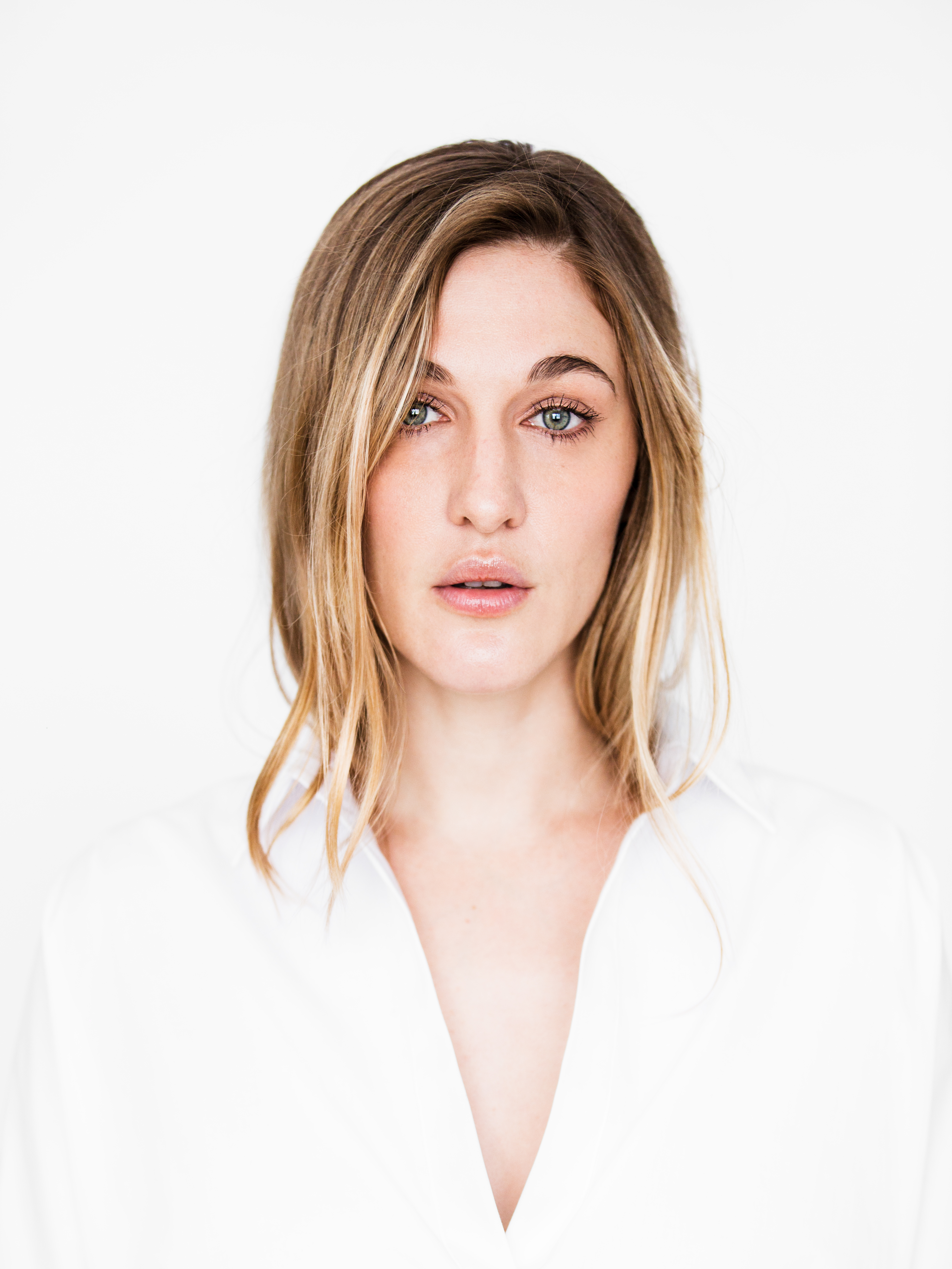
- Portrait
- Born: July 7, 1987 (age 39); Saint-Didace, Quebec
- Education: National Theatre School of Canada
- Occupation: Actress
- Years active: 2007–present

Mylène Mackay (born 7 July 1987) is a Canadian actress. She received a Canadian Screen Award nomination as Best Supporting Actress at the 4th Canadian Screen Awards for her performance in Endorphine. In 2016, she appeared as Nelly Arcan in Anne Émond's film Nelly, and as Marguerite in André Forcier's film Kiss Me Like a Lover (Embrasse-moi comme tu m'aimes).

Originally from Saint-Didace in the Lanaudière region of Quebec, she is a graduate of the National Theatre School of Canada.

She was named one of the Toronto International Film Festival's Rising Stars of 2016, alongside Grace Glowicki, Jared Abrahamson and Sophie Nélisse. In 2017, she won the Prix Iris for Best Actress for Nelly, with La Presse's Marc-André Lussier judging her to be part of a "changing of the guard" among Quebec actors and actresses.

In 2017 she won a Prix Gémeaux as Best Actress in a Web Series for her role in Ici TOU.TV's Adulthood (L'Âge adulte).

In 2020 she appeared in Escouade 99, the Quebec television adaptation of Brooklyn Nine-Nine, and in 2021 she appeared in Yan England's film Sam. She has also made several guest appearances in Transplant as Mags's sister Camille.

She has portrayed botanist Marcelle Gauvreau in two films, Forgotten Flowers (Les fleurs oubliées) by André Forcier in 2019 and Tell Me Why These Things Are So Beautiful (Dis-moi pourquoi ces choses sont si belles) by Lyne Charlebois in 2023.
