= Kiss Me Like a Lover =

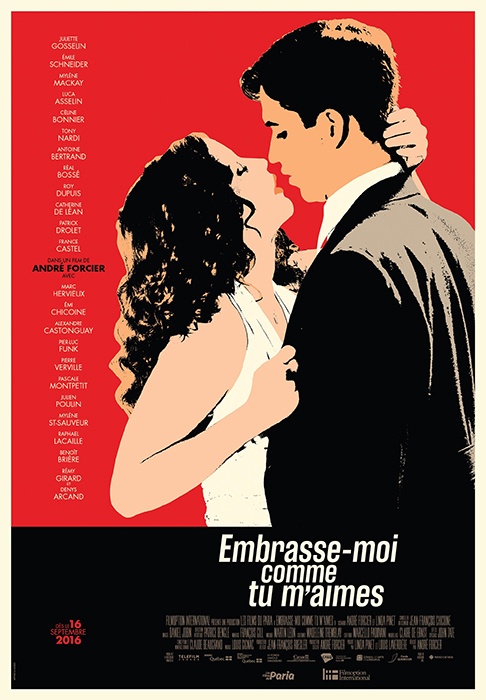
- Poster of the movie
- French: Embrasse-moi comme tu m'aimes
- Directed by: André Forcier
- Written by: André Forcier; Linda Pinet
- Produced by: André Forcier; Linda Pinet; Louis Laverdière
- Starring: Émile Schneider; Juliette Gosselin; Céline Bonnier; Tony Nardi
- Cinematography: Daniel Jobin
- Edited by: François Gill
- Music by: Martin Léon
- Production company: Les Films du Paria
- Release date: August 25, 2016
- Running time: 95 minutes
- Country: Canada
- Language: French

Kiss Me Like a Lover (French: Embrasse-moi comme tu m'aimes) is a Canadian drama film from Quebec, directed by André Forcier and released in 2016.

Set in Montreal in the 1940s, the film stars Émile Schneider as Pierre Sauvageau, a young man who wants to register for the military in World War II but must stay home to care for his paraplegic twin sister Berthe (Juliette Gosselin) as their mother (Céline Bonnier) struggles with depression. With the intimacy of care awakening her dormant sexuality, Berthe attempts to seduce Pierre; although Pierre rejects the advance, the memory of the incident goes on to colour his subsequent relationship with Marguerite (Mylène Mackay), his best friend's girlfriend, and Berthe's relationship with Élio (Tony Nardi), a university professor. The film's cast also includes Antoine Bertrand, Réal Bossé, Roy Dupuis, France Castel, Denys Arcand, Pascale Montpetit, Julien Poulin, Rémy Girard, Christine Beaulieu, Pier-Luc Funk, Geneviève Schmidt, Benoît Brière, Émi Chicoine and Marc Hervieux.

== Awards ==
Award	Date of ceremony	Category	Recipient(s)	Result	Ref.
Prix Iris	2017	Best Supporting Actor	Tony Nardi	Nominated	
Prix Iris	2017	Best Supporting Actress	Céline Bonnier	Nominated	
Prix Iris	2017	Best Screenplay	André Forcier, Linda Pinet	Nominated	
Prix Iris	2017	Best Art Direction	Patrice Bengle	Nominated	
Prix Iris	2017	Best Costume Design	Madeleine Tremblay	Nominated	
Prix Iris	2017	Best Original Music	Martin Léon	Nominated	
Prix Iris	2017	Best Makeup	Claire De Ernst	Nominated	
Prix Iris	2017	Best Hairstyling	Marcelo Nestor Padovani	Nominated	
Prix Iris	2017	Best Visual Effects	John Tate	Nominated	
