= An Imaginary Tale =

- French: Une histoire inventée
- Directed by: André Forcier
- Written by: André Forcier; Jacques Marcotte
- Produced by: Robin Spry; Claudio Luca (producer and executive producer); Jamie Brown (executive producer); Louise Abastado (associate producer)
- Starring: Tony Nardi; Jean Lapointe; Louise Marleau; Charlotte Laurier
- Cinematography: Georges Dufaux
- Edited by: Aube Foglia; François Gill
- Music by: Serge Fiori
- Production companies: Telescene Film Group Productions; Les Productions C.M. Luca
- Distributed by: Astral Films
- Release date: 4 October 1990
- Running time: 100 minutes
- Country: Canada
- Language: French
- Box office: $ 487,809

An Imaginary Tale (French: Une histoire inventée) is a 1990 Canadian drama film directed by André Forcier. The film was selected as the Canadian entry for the Best Foreign Language Film at the 63rd Academy Awards, but was not accepted as a nominee.

== Plot ==
Toni (Nardi) is the director of a staged rendition of Othello in Montreal. It is a pet project of his, financed by his mafia uncle. Unbeknownst to him, the audiences are also rounded up and paid by the same uncle. Some of them have seen every performance of this tragic play, and are understandably bored, so when the backstage romantic events of the actors result in absurd situations onstage, the audience is delighted. There are a huge number of romantic situations going on in this film at the same time. One of them involves Gaston (Lapointe), a somewhat world-weary jazz musician, and Florence (Marleau), a glamorous middle-aged woman who has been pining for him for years. Another involves two members of the musician's jazz trio. Yet another involves the play's Desdemona, Soledad (Laurier), the girlfriend of the man playing Othello, who can't keep his hands off his dresser. She is also Florence's niece.

== Awards and nominations ==
- 1991
  - Genie Award for Best Achievement in Direction - André Forcier - Nominated
  - Genie Award for Best Motion Picture - Claudio Luca, Robin Spry - Nominated
  - Genie Award for Best Original Screenplay - Jacques Marcotte, André Forcier - Nominated
- 1990
  - Montreal World Film Festival Most Popular Film - André Forcier - Nominated - Won
  - Sudbury Cinefest Best Canadian Film - André Forcier - Won

== See also ==
- List of submissions to the 63rd Academy Awards for Best Foreign Language Film
- List of Canadian submissions for the Academy Award for Best Foreign Language Film
