= The Salesman (2011 film) =

- Film poster
- French: Le vendeur
- Directed by: Sébastien Pilote
- Written by: Sébastien Pilote
- Produced by: Marc Daigle, Bernadette Payeur
- Starring: Gilbert Sicotte
- Cinematography: Michel La Veaux
- Edited by: Michel Arcand
- Music by: Pierre Lapointe (additional music and arrangement: Philippe Brault)
- Production company: ACPAV
- Distributed by: Entertainment One Films Canada; Les Films Séville; Sophie Dulac Distribution; Seville Pictures
- Release date: January 21, 2011 (Sundance Film Festival)
- Running time: 107 minutes
- Country: Canada
- Language: French

The Salesman (French: Le vendeur) is a 2011 Canadian drama film directed by Sébastien Pilote. The film premiered at the Sundance Film Festival and had a theatrical release in Quebec on 11 November 2011.

Shot in the small city Dolbeau-Mistassini, in the Saguenay–Lac-Saint-Jean region of the province of Quebec, the film looks at the effects of a declining economy on a sexagenarian car salesman.

== Distinctions ==
The film was included in the list of "Canada's Top Ten" feature films of 2011, selected by a panel of experts organized by TIFF.

The film won the FIPRESCI Prize at the San Francisco International Film Festival and two prizes (the Silver Gateway and the prize for best actor) at the Mumbai Film Festival.

The film had five Jutra Award nominations, winning in the Best Actor category (Gilbert Sicotte)

At the 2011 International Filmfestival Mannheim-Heidelberg, The Salesman won the FIPRESCI international film critics' prize, as well as a special jury prize.

At the 2011 Torino Film Festival, The Salesman won two prizes, the Premio Cipputi (best film on the world of work) and the FIPRESCI prize.

The film won the top prize at the 2012 Cinema Jove Film Festival in Valencia.

The film was shortlisted for the inaugural Prix collégial du cinéma québécois in 2012.

== Release ==
The Salesman was released on Blu-ray and DVD on March 6, 2012 by Entertainment One Films Canada.

== See also ==
- Death of a Salesman
