= The United States of Albert =

- French: Les États-Unis d'Albert
- Directed by: André Forcier
- Written by: André Forcier; Linda Pinet
- Produced by: Yves Fortin; David Kodsi; André Martin
- Starring: Éric Bruneau; Émilie Dequenne; Roy Dupuis
- Cinematography: Daniel Jobin
- Edited by: Elisabeth Guido
- Music by: Jean-Philippe Héritier
- Production companies: Productions Thalie; Link's Productions; Bohemian Films
- Distributed by: Christal Films
- Release date: April 8, 2005
- Running time: 91 minutes
- Country: Canada
- Language: French

The United States of Albert (French: Les États-Unis d'Albert) is a Canadian, French and Swiss co-produced comedy-drama film, directed by André Forcier and released in 2005. The film stars Éric Bruneau as Albert Renaud, a young actor in Montreal who dreams of becoming a movie star in Hollywood, and sets off on a road trip across the United States in pursuit of his dreams; en route, he meets a variety of characters including Grace Carson (Émilie Dequenne), a young Mormon woman with whom he falls in love, and Jack Decker (Roy Dupuis), a mentally unstable man who takes Albert golfing in the Arizona desert.

== Cast ==
- Éric Bruneau : Albert Renaud
- Émilie Dequenne : Grace Carson
- Andréa Ferréol : Jane Pickford
- Roy Dupuis : Jack Decker
- Laurent Deshusses : Peter Malone
- Alex Descas : Nolton Barnett
- Patricia Ubeda : Maria Romero
- Marc Labrèche : Simon
- Céline Bonnier : Hannah Steinway

== Reception ==
Brendan Kelly of the Montreal Gazette panned the film, writing that Forcier's decision to cast a mixture of Québécois and European actors resulted in a distracting diversity of accents and that it strained credulity that the American characters Albert met on his trip would all be able to speak French.

Gilles Aird received a Jutra Award nomination for Best Art Direction at the 8th Jutra Awards in 2006. The film was a Lumière Award nominee for Best French-Language Film at the 12th Lumière Awards in 2007.
