= Sébastien Pilote =

Canadian film director and screenwriter (born 1973)

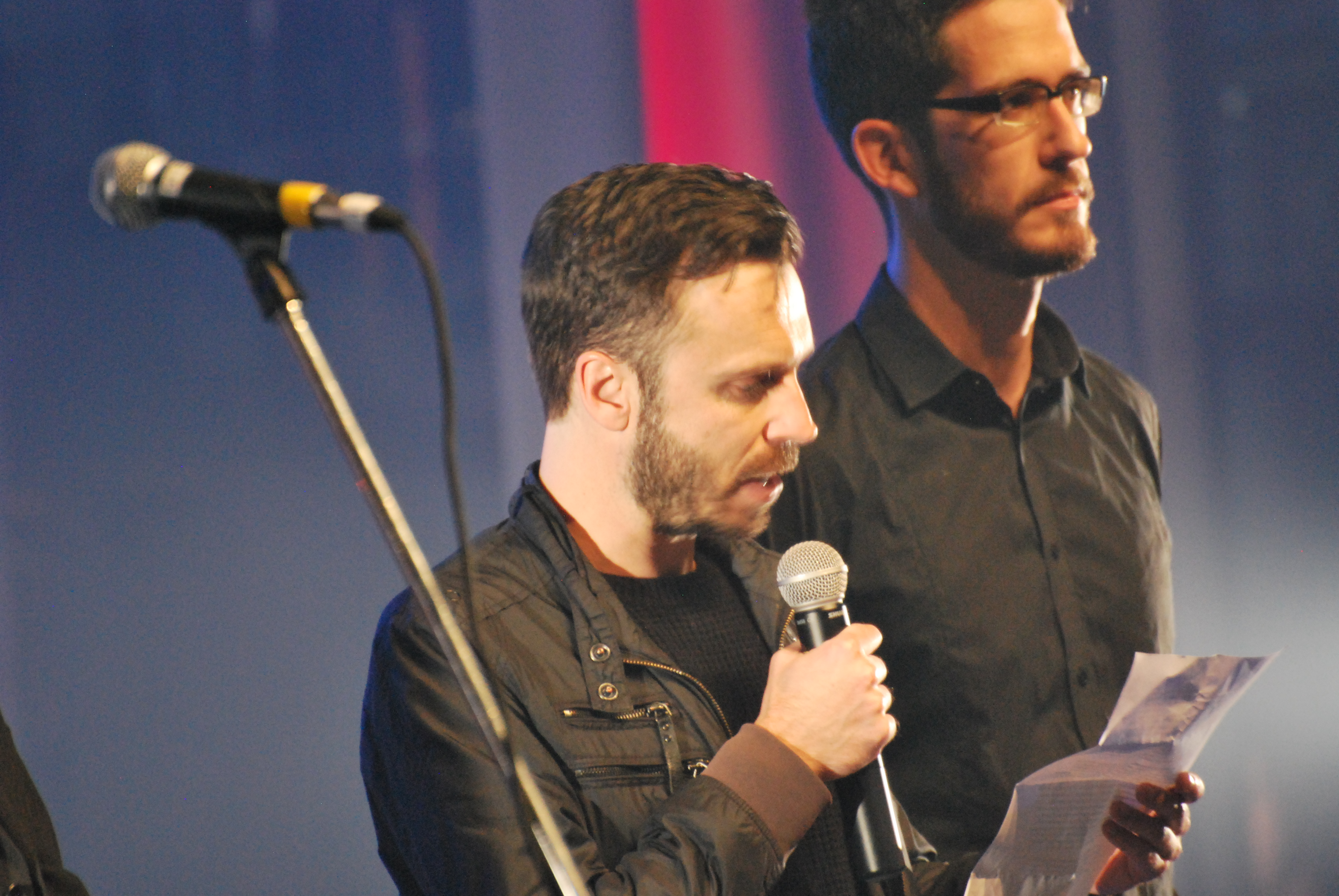
- Pilote (left) in 2014
- Born: 1973 (age 51–52); Saint-Ambroise, Quebec, Canada
- Occupation(s): film director, producer
- Years active: 2000s-present
- Notable work: The Salesman, The Dismantling

Sébastien Pilote (born 1973 in Saint-Ambroise, Quebec) is a Canadian film director and screenwriter. He was a Canadian Screen Award nominee for Best Director and Best Original Screenplay at the 2nd Canadian Screen Awards for his 2013 film The Dismantling (Le Démantèlement).

He previously directed the short film Dust Bowl Ha! Ha! in 2007, and the feature film The Salesman in 2011, and has worked for Télé-Québec.

In 2014 he was the patron and curator of the Festival Vues dans la tête de... film festival in Rivière-du-Loup.

== Filmography ==
Year	Film	Director	Writer	Awards and Nominations	Notes
2007	Dust Bowl Ha! Ha!	Yes	Yes	Nominated - Jutra Award for Best Short Film (2008) Nominated - Locarno International Film Festival Golden Pardino - Leopards of Tomorrow (International Competition) (2007)	Short
2011	The Salesman (Le Vendeur)	Yes	Yes	Won - Mannheim-Heidelberg International Filmfestival PIPRESCI Prize, Special Prize of the Jury (International Competition), Audience Award (International Competition) (2011) Won - Bombay International Film Festival Silver Gateway Jury Grand Prize (2011) Won - Torino Film Festival FIPRESCI Prize (2011) Won - Torino Film Festival Cipputi Award (2011) Nominated - Torino Film Festival Prize of the City of Torino for Best Feature Film (2011) Nominated - Sundance Film Festival Grand Jury Prize for World Cinema - Dramatic (2011) Nominated - Jutra Award for Best International Motion Picture, Best Screenplay (2012) Nominated - Lume International Film Festival Jury Award for Best Feature Film (2011)	
2013	The Dismantling (Le Démantèlement)	Yes	Yes	Won - Cannes Film Festival SACD Award (2013) Won - Torino Film Festival FIPRESCI Prize (2013) Nominated - Torino Film Festival Prize of the City of Torino for Best Feature Film (2013) Nominated - Jutra Award in Best Direction, Best International Motion Picture (2014) Nominated - Cannes Film Festival Critics Week Grand Prize (2013) Nominated - Canadian Screen Award for Achievement in Direction, Original Screenplay (2013) Nominated - Lumière Award for Best French-Language Film (2014) Nominated - São Paulo International Film Festival International Jury Award for Best Feature Film (2013) Nominated - Tallinn Black Nights Film Festival Best North American Independent Film (2013)	
2018	The Fireflies Are Gone (La disparition des lucioles)	Yes	Yes		
2021	Maria Chapdelaine	Yes	Yes		
