= Coteau rouge =

Coteau Rouge
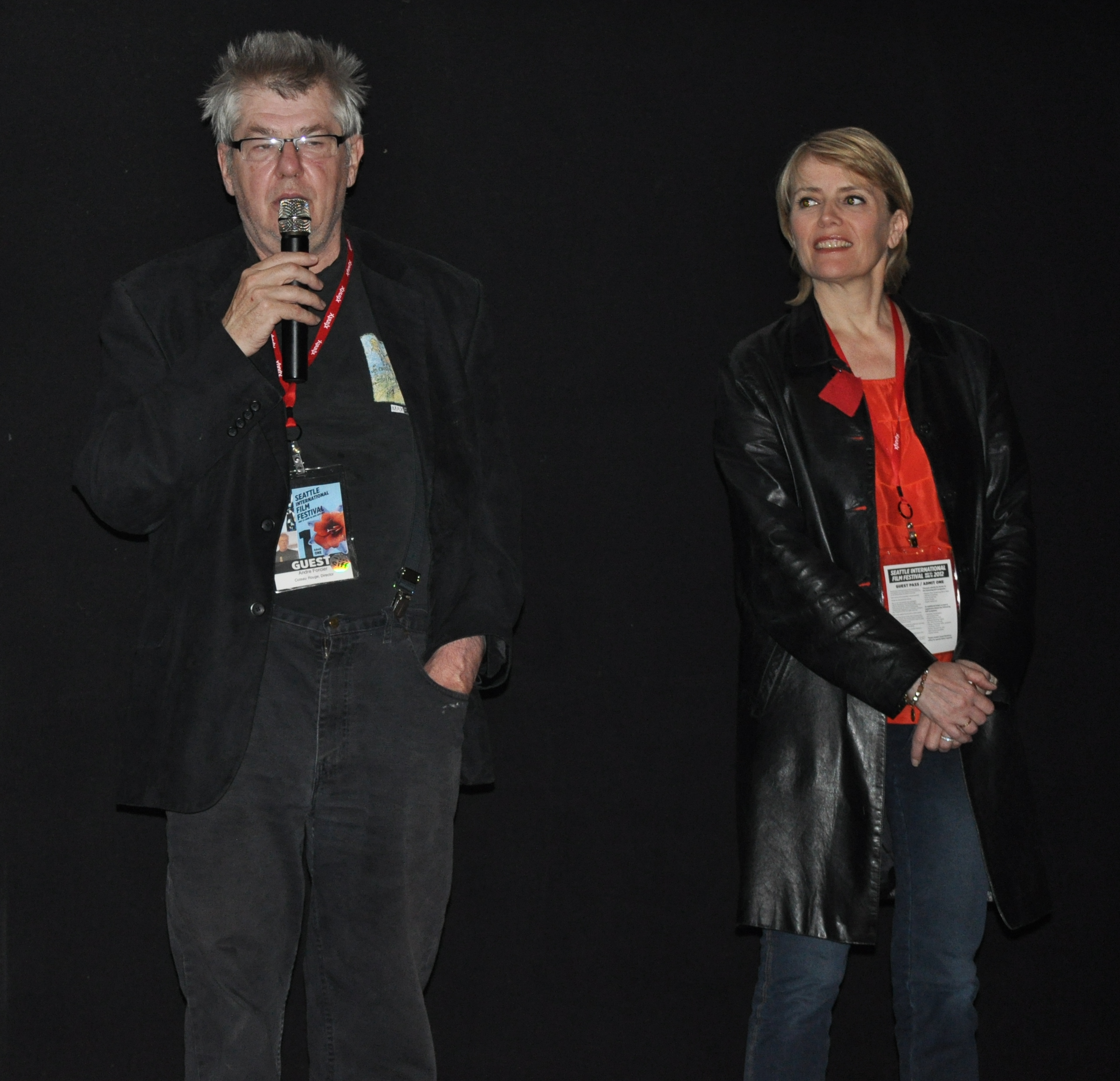
- Director André Forcier and actress Hélène Reeves at a Seattle International Film Festival showing of the film
- Directed by: André Forcier
- Written by: André Forcier
- Produced by: Linda Pinet
- Starring: Céline Bonnier; Roy Dupuis; Paolo Noël; Gaston Lepage; Louise Laparé; Julie du Page
- Cinematography: Daniel Jobin
- Edited by: Linda Pinet
- Music by: Michel Cusson; Kim Gaboury
- Production company: Films du Paria
- Distributed by: Atopia
- Release date: September 9, 2011
- Country: Canada
- Language: French

Coteau Rouge is a 2011 French-Canadian film written and directed by André Forcier and produced by Les Films du Paria.

== Synopsis ==
The offbeat comedy from André Forcier is about the Blanchard family, a tightknit group living in Coteau Rouge on the South Shore of the St. Lawrence River in Longueuil. The grandfather of the clan (Paolo Noël) was once a fisherman who togot rid of bodies for the mob. His son (Lepage) runs the local gas station and has two children: Hélène (Céline Bonnier) and Henri. Hélène is childless and so her mother (Louise Laparé) is carrying her baby. Meanwhile, her husband (Roy Dupuis), an unscrupulous entrepreneur, wants to buy up the land to build an upscale condo.

== Awards ==
The film won Best Canadian Film at the Montreal World Film Festival.
