= Céline Bonnier =

Canadian actress

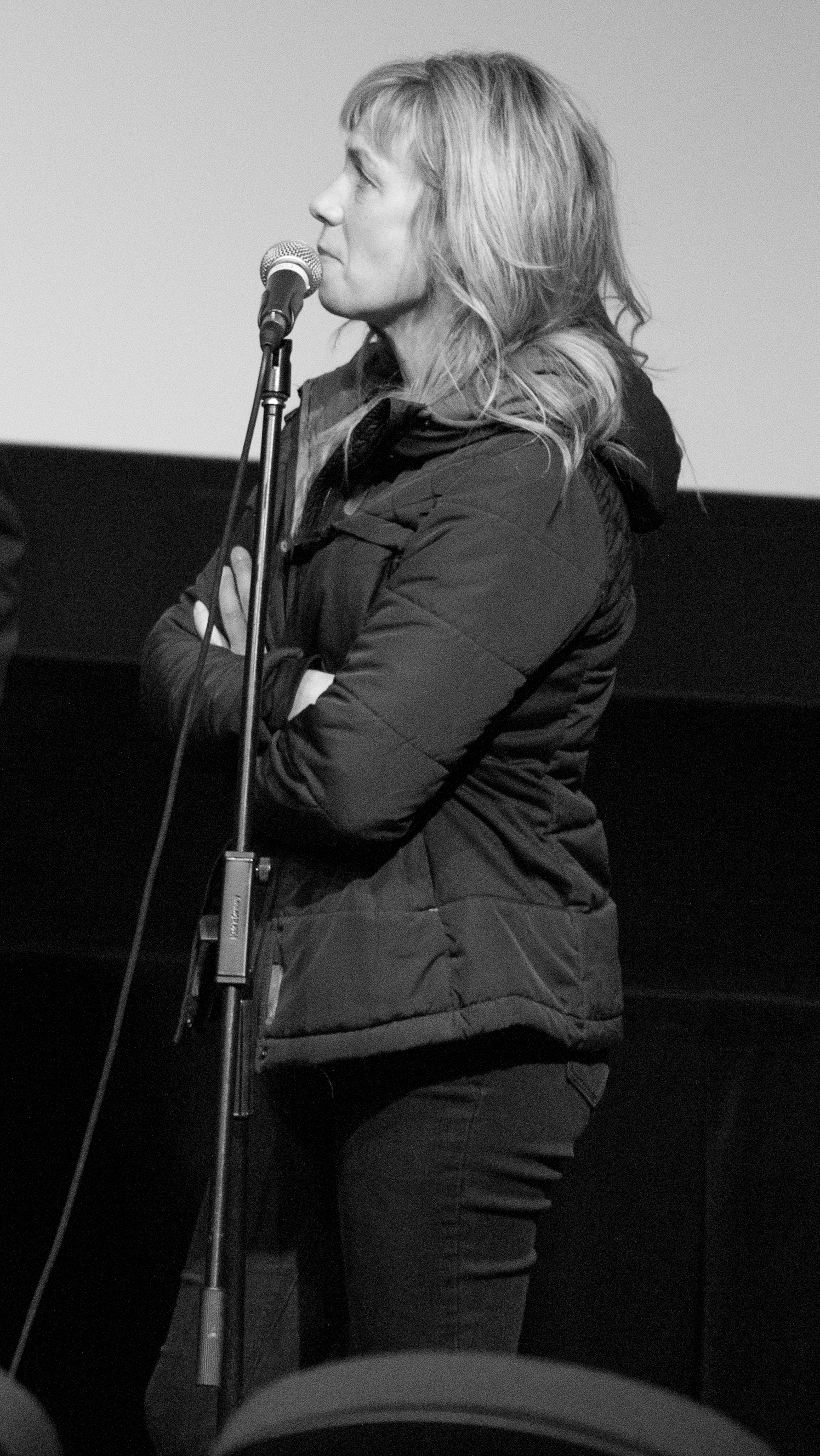
- Born: August 31, 1965 (age 59); Lévis, Quebec, Canada
- Occupation: Actress
- Years active: 1991–present

Céline Bonnier (French: [selin bɔnje]; born 31 August 1965) is a French Canadian actress from Quebec. She has been nominated for four awards including Genie Awards and Gemini Awards.

== Filmography ==
- 1992: Tectonic Plates
- 1994: The Wind from Wyoming (Le Vent du Wyoming) : "Manon Mentha"
- 1994: Million Dollar Babies (TV) : "Elzire Dionne"
- 1995: The Sphinx (Le Sphinx) : "Angie"
- 1996: Caboose : "Camille"
- 1997: Le Masque (série TV) : "Louise Gabriel"
- 1997: The Assignment : "Carla"
- 1998: La Femme Nikita (série télévisée) : Off Profile: "Andrea Kosov"
- 2000: Tag (série TV) : "Melanie Jobin"
- 2000: The Orphan Muses (Les Muses orphelines) : "Martine Tanguay"
- 2001: On Your Head (Le Ciel sur la tête)
- 2002: Tag - Épilogue (série TV) : "Mélanie Jobin"
- 2002: Le Dernier chapitre (feuilleton TV) : "Wendy Desbiens"
- 2002: Random Passage (feuilleton TV) : "Ida Norris"
- 2002: Le Dernier chapitre: La Suite (feuilleton TV) : "Wendy Desbiens"
- 2002: Tag II (série TV) : "Melanie Jobin"
- 2002: Séraphin: Heart of Stone (Séraphin: un homme et son péché): "Nanette"
- 2003: Far Side of the Moon (La Face cachée de la lune): "Nathalie"
- 2004: The Last Tunnel (Le Dernier Tunnel): "Annie Beaudoin"
- 2004: Machine Gun Molly (Monica la mitraille): "Monica"
- 2005: L'Héritière de grande ourse (feuilleton TV) : "Denise/Dora"
- 2005: The United States of Albert (Les États-Unis d'Albert): "Hannah Steinway"
- 2005: Human Trafficking (feuilleton TV): "Sophie"
- 2006: A Sunday in Kigali (Un dimanche à Kigali) : "Élise"
- 2006: Deliver Me (Délivrez-moi): "Annie"
- 2006: A Family Secret (Le secret de ma mère) : "Jeanne"
- 2008: Truffles (Truffe): "Alice"
- 2008: Mommy Is at the Hairdresser's (Maman est chez le coiffeur): "La Mère - Simone Gauvin "
- 2010: Les Rescapés: "Gina McCrae"
- 2014: Love Project (Love Projet)
- 2015: The Passion of Augustine (La Passion d'Augustine)
- 2016: Kiss Me Like a Lover (Embrasse-moi comme tu m'aimes)
- 2018: For Those Who Don't Read Me (À tous ceux qui ne me lisent pas)
- 2021: North of Albany (Au nord d'Albany)
- 2021: The Time Thief (L'Arracheuse de temps)
- 2022: A Criminal Affair (Une Affaire Criminelle)
