= André Forcier =

Canadian film director and screenwriter

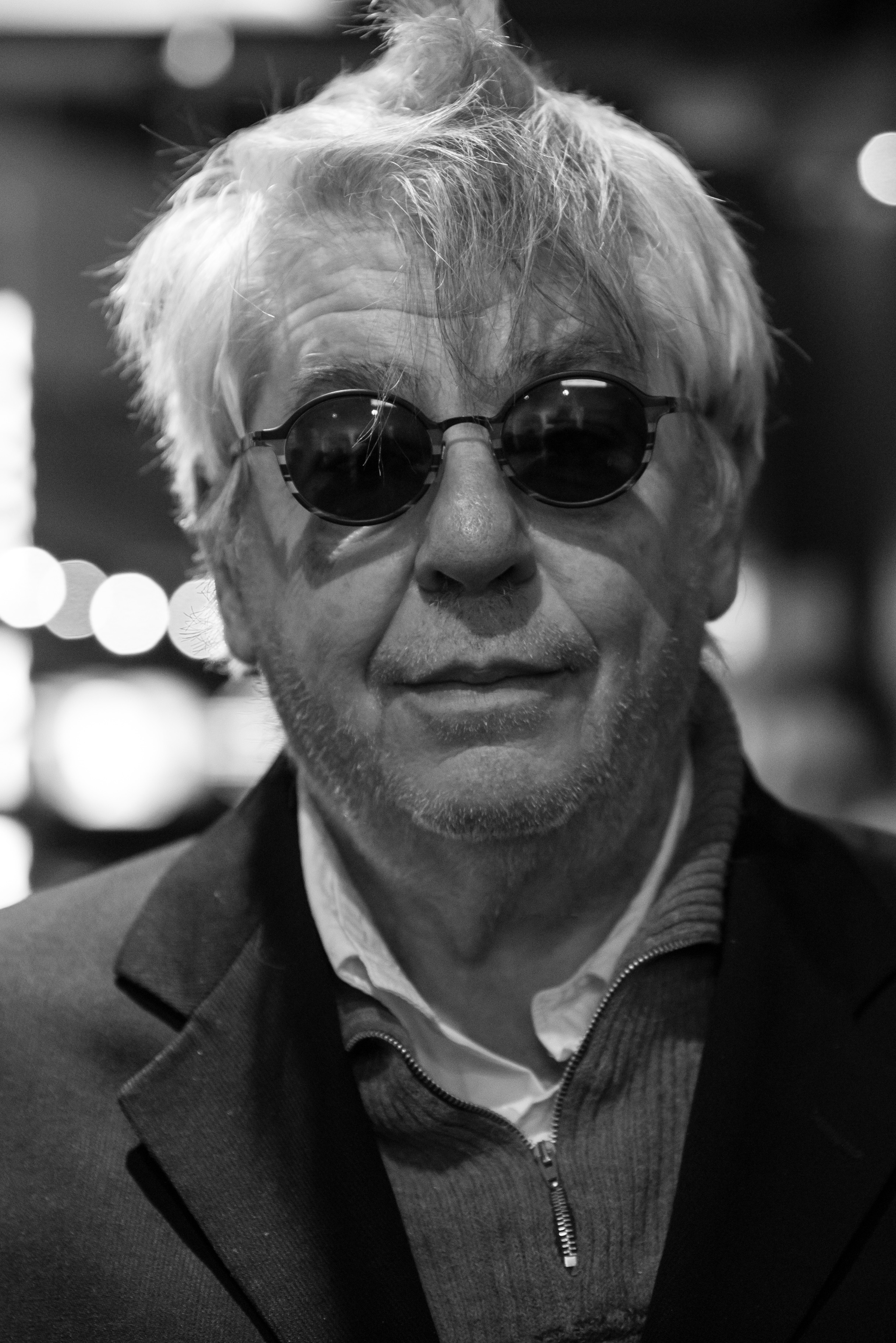
- André Forcier (2018)
- Born: Marc-André Forcier; July 19, 1947 (age 78); Montreal, Quebec, Canada
- Occupations: Film director, screenwriter
- Years active: 1971–present
- Spouse: Linda Pinet
- Children: François Pinet-Forcier; Renaud Pinet-Forcier

André Forcier (born Marc-André Forcier on July 19, 1947) is a Canadian film director and screenwriter. His work has been linked to Latin American magic realism by its use of fantasy but is firmly rooted in Quebec's reality. His unromanticized, even Rabelaisian, portraits of people on the fringe of society, especially in Bar Salon, Au clair de la lune, Une Historie inventée, Le Vent du Wyoming and The Countess of Baton Rouge, blend observations of minutia of everyday life with elements of fantasy and imaginary.

He became interested in film while still at college, won a Radio-Canada contest with his first 8-mm film, and in 1966 financed and produced his first 16-mm film.

His wife, Linda Pinet, has been co-producer and co-writer of many of his films. The two cofounded the independent film studio Les Films du Paria. Pinet was solely a producer, not a co-writer, of his 2024 film Ababooned (Ababouiné), although the couple's sons, François Pinet-Forcier and Renaud Pinet-Forcier, were co-writers.

In 2018 he was the subject of Des histoires inventées, a documentary film by Jean-Marc E. Roy. He subsequently collaborated directly with Roy as co-director of the 2025 docufiction film Cardboard City (Ville Jacques-Carton).

== Filmography ==
- 1966: La mort vue par...
- 1967: Chroniques Labradoriennes
- 1971: The Return of the Immaculate Conception (Le Retour de l'immaculé conception)
- 1974: Night Cap
- 1974: Bar Salon
- 1976: A Pacemaker and a Sidecar (L'Eau chaude, l'eau frette)
- 1983: Au clair de la lune
- 1988: Kalamazoo
- 1990: An Imaginary Tale (Une histoire inventée)
- 1994: The Wind from Wyoming (Le Vent du Wyoming)
- 1998: The Countess of Baton Rouge (La Comtesse de Bâton Rouge)
- 2004: Acapulco Gold
- 2005: The United States of Albert (Les États-Unis d'Albert)
- 2009: Je me souviens
- 2011: Coteau Rouge
- 2016: Kiss Me Like a Lover (Embrasse-moi comme tu m'aimes)
- 2019: Forgotten Flowers (Les fleurs oubliées)
- 2024: Ababooned (Ababouiné)
- 2025: Cardboard City (Ville Jacques-Carton), codirected with Jean-Marc E. Roy

== Awards ==
Forcier won the Prix André-Guérin in 1990. In 2003, he won the prix Albert-Tessier for an outstanding career in Quebec cinema. In 2010, he received Canada's Governor General's Awards in Visual and Media Arts He has received six Genie Award nominations. In the 2018 Prix Iris, he was honoured with the Iris Hommage for 50 years of contributions to the province's film industry. In 2024, he was awarded the Prix Denis-Héroux Award at the 28th Fantasia International Film Festival.
