= Canadian Screen Award for Best Hair =

Annual Canadian film award

- Country: Canada
- Presented by: Academy of Canadian Cinema & Television
- First award: 2018
- Currently held by: Sava Zeranska for Honey Bunch (2025)
- Website: academy.ca/awards

The Canadian Screen Award for Best Hair is an annual award, presented by the Academy of Canadian Cinema and Television, as part of the Canadian Screen Awards program, to honour achievements in hairstyling in Canadian film.

The award was introduced for the first time at the 7th Canadian Screen Awards. Prior to its creation, hairstylists were eligible for nomination in the category for Best Makeup.

== 2010s ==
| Year | Nominees | Films | Ref |
|---|---|---|---|
2018; 7th Canadian Screen Awards
| 2018; 7th Canadian Screen Awards | Peggy Kyriakidou | Stockholm | |
| 2018; 7th Canadian Screen Awards | Renée Chan | Love Jacked | |
| 2018; 7th Canadian Screen Awards | Daniel Jacob | 1991 | |
| 2018; 7th Canadian Screen Awards | Anne Moralis, André Duval | The Hummingbird Project | |
| 2018; 7th Canadian Screen Awards | Johanne Paiement | Slut in a Good Way (Charlotte a du fun) | |
2019; 8th Canadian Screen Awards
| 2019; 8th Canadian Screen Awards | Nermin Grbic | The Twentieth Century | |
| 2019; 8th Canadian Screen Awards | Dann Campbell | Riot Girls | |
| 2019; 8th Canadian Screen Awards | Michelle Coté, Péter Gyongyosi, Erzsébet Racz | The Song of Names | |
| 2019; 8th Canadian Screen Awards | Peggy Kyriakidou | American Woman | |
| 2019; 8th Canadian Screen Awards | Nathan Rival | The Kindness of Strangers | |

== 2020s ==
| Year | Nominee | Film | Ref |
|---|---|---|---|
2020; 9th Canadian Screen Awards
| 2020; 9th Canadian Screen Awards | Michelle Côté | My Salinger Year | |
| 2020; 9th Canadian Screen Awards | Renée Chan | Tammy's Always Dying | |
| 2020; 9th Canadian Screen Awards | Patricia Cuthbert | Random Acts of Violence | |
| 2020; 9th Canadian Screen Awards | France Latreille | French Exit | |
| 2020; 9th Canadian Screen Awards | Ashley Nay | Happy Place | |
2021; 10th Canadian Screen Awards
| 2021; 10th Canadian Screen Awards | Martin Lapointe | Maria Chapdelaine | |
| 2021; 10th Canadian Screen Awards | André Duval | The Vinland Club (Le Club Vinland) | |
| 2021; 10th Canadian Screen Awards | Debra Johnson | The Exchange | |
| 2021; 10th Canadian Screen Awards | Janie Otis | The Time Thief (L'Arracheuse de temps) | |
| 2021; 10th Canadian Screen Awards | Denis Parent, Jean-Luc Lapierre | Confessions of a Hitman (Confessions) | |
2022; 11th Canadian Screen Awards
| 2022; 11th Canadian Screen Awards | Tremaine Thomas | Brother | |
| 2022; 11th Canadian Screen Awards | Vincent Dufault | Viking | |
| 2022; 11th Canadian Screen Awards | Charlene Dunn | Bones of Crows | |
| 2022; 11th Canadian Screen Awards | Mykola Korolyov | The Swearing Jar | |
2023; 12th Canadian Screen Awards
| 2023; 12th Canadian Screen Awards | Dylan Twigg, Philippe Bertrand-Hudon | BlackBerry | |
| 2023; 12th Canadian Screen Awards | Vincent Dufault | Ru | |
| 2023; 12th Canadian Screen Awards | Nermin Grbic, Carole Bertini | One Summer (Le temps d'un été) | |
| 2023; 12th Canadian Screen Awards | Mykola Korolyov | Better Days | |
| 2023; 12th Canadian Screen Awards | Isabelle Paganine | Seagrass | |
| 2023; 12th Canadian Screen Awards | Rikki Zucker | Mother of All Shows | |
2024; 13th Canadian Screen Awards
| 2024; 13th Canadian Screen Awards | Michelle Côté, Charlotte Delaet, Sandra Kelly | The Apprentice | |
| 2024; 13th Canadian Screen Awards | Paula Fleet | The Shrouds | |
| 2024; 13th Canadian Screen Awards | Leanne Morrison-Freed, Stracey Millar | Humane | |
| 2024; 13th Canadian Screen Awards | Chiara Naccarata | Out Come the Wolves | |
| 2024; 13th Canadian Screen Awards | Nathan Rival, Tori Binns | Seven Veils | |
2025; 14th Canadian Screen Awards
| 2025; 14th Canadian Screen Awards | Sava Zeranska | Honey Bunch | |
| 2025; 14th Canadian Screen Awards | Karola Dimberger | Whistle | |
| 2025; 14th Canadian Screen Awards | Lyne Lapiana | Lovely Day (Mille secrets mille dangers) | |
| 2025; 14th Canadian Screen Awards | Pina Robinson | The Mother and the Bear | |
| 2025; 14th Canadian Screen Awards | Toni Warren | At the Place of Ghosts (Sk+te’kmujue’katik) | |

== See also ==
- Prix Iris for Best Hair
