= Arnaud Vachon =

Canadian actor

Arnaud Vachon is a Canadian actor from Saint-Isidore, Quebec. He is most noed for his performance in the film The Vinland Club (Le Club Vinland), for which he received a Prix Iris nomination for Revelation of the Year at the 23rd Quebec Cinema Awards in 2021.

He has also appeared in the films Maria and Humanist Vampire Seeking Consenting Suicidal Person (Vampire humaniste cherche suicidaire consentant), and the television series, L'échappée, Les yeux fermés, L'Homme qui aimait trop, Léo, Comme des têtes pas de poule and The Night Logan Woke Up.
