= Prix Iris for Best Hair =

Annual award for films made in Quebec

The Prix Iris for Best Hair (French: Prix Iris de la meilleure coiffure) is an annual film award, presented by Québec Cinéma as part of its Prix Iris awards program, to honour the year's best hairstyling in films made within the Cinema of Quebec.

The award was presented for the first time at the 7th Jutra Awards in 2005. Prior to its creation, hairstylists could receive nominations in the Best Makeup category.

Until 2016, it was known as the Jutra Award for Best Hair in memory of influential Quebec film director Claude Jutra. Following the withdrawal of Jutra's name from the award, the 2016 award was presented under the name Québec Cinéma. The Prix Iris name was announced in October 2016.

Hairstylist Martin Lapointe has dominated the category, holding the record for most nominations with fifteen. He also has won the most awards, seven, including two consecutive wins in 2013 and 2014 and again in 2016 and 2017. Lapointe also became the first person to receiving four nominations in the same category in 2016.

== 2000s ==
Year	Winners and nominees	Film
2005; 7th Jutra Awards
2005; 7th Jutra Awards	Michelle Côté	Bittersweet Memories (Ma vie en cinémascope)
2005; 7th Jutra Awards	Réjean Goderre	Head in the Clouds
2005; 7th Jutra Awards	Linda Gordon	Happy Camper (Camping sauvage)
2005; 7th Jutra Awards	Denis Parent	Machine Gun Molly (Monica la mitraille)
2006; 8th Jutra Awards
2006; 8th Jutra Awards	Réjean Goderre	C.R.A.Z.Y.
2006; 8th Jutra Awards	Réjean Forget	Instant Idol (Idole instantanée)
2006; 8th Jutra Awards	Martin Lapointe	The Rocket (Maurice Richard)
2006; 8th Jutra Awards	Johanne Paiement	The Outlander (Le Survenant)
2007; 9th Jutra Awards
2007; 9th Jutra Awards	Ginette Cérat-Lajeunesse	A Family Secret (Le secret de ma mère)
2007; 9th Jutra Awards	Johanne Paiement	Bon Cop, Bad Cop
2007; 9th Jutra Awards	Denis Parent	Without Her (Sans elle)
2007; 9th Jutra Awards	Martin Rivest	The Genius of Crime (Le génie du crime)
2008; 10th Jutra Awards
2008; 10th Jutra Awards	Réjean Forget	My Aunt Aline (Ma tante Aline)
2008; 10th Jutra Awards	Réjean Goderre	My Daughter, My Angel (Ma fille, mon ange)
2008; 10th Jutra Awards	Johanne Paiement	The 3 L'il Pigs (Les 3 P'tits Cochons)
2008; 10th Jutra Awards	Denis Parent	Nitro
2009; 11th Jutra Awards
2009; 11th Jutra Awards	Martin Lapointe	Mommy Is at the Hairdresser's (Maman est chez le coiffeur)
2009; 11th Jutra Awards	Réjean Goderre	Cruising Bar 2
2009; 11th Jutra Awards	Manon Joly	It's Not Me, I Swear! (C'est pas moi, je le jure!)
2009; 11th Jutra Awards	Denis Parent	Babine

== 2010s ==
Year	Winners and nominees	Film
2010; 12th Jutra Awards
2010; 12th Jutra Awards	Linda Gordon	1981
2010; 12th Jutra Awards	André Duval	The Master Key (Grande Ourse, la clé des possibles)
2010; 12th Jutra Awards	Martin Lapointe	Waitresses Wanted (Serveuses demandées)
2010; 12th Jutra Awards	Marie-Lyne Normandin	Through the Mist (Dédé à travers les brumes)
2010; 12th Jutra Awards	Martin Rivest	Je me souviens
2011; 13th Jutra Awards
2011; 13th Jutra Awards	Réjean Goderre	Barney's Version
2011; 13th Jutra Awards	André Duval	The Hair of the Beast (Le Poil de la bête)
2011; 13th Jutra Awards	Réjean Goderre	Oscar and the Lady in Pink (Oscar et la dame rose)
2011; 13th Jutra Awards	Sabin Paradis	The Comeback (Cabotins)
2011; 13th Jutra Awards	Philippe Sarfati	Heartbeats (Les amours imaginaires)
2012; 14th Jutra Awards
2012; 14th Jutra Awards	Denis Parent	Gerry
2012; 14th Jutra Awards	Martin Lapointe	A Life Begins (Une vie qui commence)
2012; 14th Jutra Awards	Marcelo Nestor Padovani	Coteau rouge
2012; 14th Jutra Awards	Denis Parent	Thrill of the Hills (Frisson des collines)
2012; 14th Jutra Awards	Ghislaine Sant, Frédéric Birault	Café de Flore
2013; 15th Jutra Awards
2013; 15th Jutra Awards	Michelle Côté, Martin Lapointe	Laurence Anyways
2013; 15th Jutra Awards	André Duval	L'Affaire Dumont
2013; 15th Jutra Awards	Richard Hansen	Mars and April (Mars et Avril)
2013; 15th Jutra Awards	Ann-Louise Landry	The Bossé Empire (L'Empire Bossé)
2013; 15th Jutra Awards	Denis Parent	Ésimésac
2014; 16th Jutra Awards
2014; 16th Jutra Awards	Martin Lapointe	Louis Cyr
2014; 16th Jutra Awards	Réjean Goderre	When We Were Boys (Il était une fois les Boys)
2014; 16th Jutra Awards	Manon Joly	Mirror Lake (Lac Mystère)
2014; 16th Jutra Awards	Maïna Militza	Hunting the Northern Godard (La Chasse au Godard d'Abbittibbi)
2014; 16th Jutra Awards	Denis Parent	The Four Soldiers (Les Quatre Soldats)
2015; 17th Jutra Awards
2015; 17th Jutra Awards	Daniel Jacob	1987
2015; 17th Jutra Awards	Réjean Forget, Cynthia Patton	Maïna
2015; 17th Jutra Awards	Ann-Louise Landry	Miraculum
2015; 17th Jutra Awards	Martin Lapointe	Henri Henri
2015; 17th Jutra Awards	Ghislaine Sant	Love Project
2016; 18th Quebec Cinema Awards
2016; 18th Quebec Cinema Awards	Martin Lapointe	The Passion of Augustine (La passion d'Augustine)
2016; 18th Quebec Cinema Awards	Réjean Goderre	Elephant Song
2016; 18th Quebec Cinema Awards	Martin Lapointe	Corbo
2016; 18th Quebec Cinema Awards	Martin Lapointe	Our Loved Ones (Les êtres chers)
2016; 18th Quebec Cinema Awards	Martin Lapointe	Ville-Marie
2017; 19th Quebec Cinema Awards
2017; 19th Quebec Cinema Awards	Martin Lapointe	Nelly
2017; 19th Quebec Cinema Awards	Marie-France Cardinal, Véronique-Anne Leblanc	Wild Run: The Legend (Chasse-Galerie: La Légende)
2017; 19th Quebec Cinema Awards	Réjean Goderre	Race
2017; 19th Quebec Cinema Awards	Marcelo Nestor Padovani	Kiss Me Like a Lover (Embrasse-moi comme tu m'aimes)
2017; 19th Quebec Cinema Awards	Denis Vidal	It's Only the End of the World (Juste la fin du monde)
2018; 20th Quebec Cinema Awards
2018; 20th Quebec Cinema Awards	Réjean Forget, Ann-Louise Landry	Hochelaga, Land of Souls (Hochelaga, terre des âmes)
2018; 20th Quebec Cinema Awards	Lina Fernanda Cadavis, Priscila De Villalobos, Aleli Mesina, Pamela Warden	X Quinientos
2018; 20th Quebec Cinema Awards	Anne-Marie Lanza	We Are the Others (Nous sommes les autres)
2018; 20th Quebec Cinema Awards	Jean-Luc Lapierre, Denis Parent	Cross My Heart (Les rois mongols)
2018; 20th Quebec Cinema Awards	Denis Parent	The Little Girl Who Was Too Fond of Matches (La petite fille qui aimait trop les allumettes)
2019; 21st Quebec Cinema Awards
2019; 21st Quebec Cinema Awards	Martin Lapointe	La Bolduc
2019; 21st Quebec Cinema Awards	Nathalie Dion	For Those Who Don't Read Me (À tous ceux qui ne me lisent pas)
2019; 21st Quebec Cinema Awards	André Duval	The Fall of Sparta (La chute de Sparte)
2019; 21st Quebec Cinema Awards	Dominique T. Hasbani	Ghost Town Anthology (Répertoire des villes disparues)
2019; 21st Quebec Cinema Awards	Daniel Jacob	1991

== 2020s ==
Year	Winners and nominees	Film	Ref
2020; 22nd Quebec Cinema Awards
2020; 22nd Quebec Cinema Awards	Nermin Grbic	The Twentieth Century	
2020; 22nd Quebec Cinema Awards	Michelle Coté	The Song of Names	
2020; 22nd Quebec Cinema Awards	Stéphanie Deflandre	Mafia Inc.	
2020; 22nd Quebec Cinema Awards	Daniel Jacob	Fabulous (Fabuleuses)	
2020; 22nd Quebec Cinema Awards	Martin Lapointe	And the Birds Rained Down (Il pleuvait des oiseaux)	
2021; 23rd Quebec Cinema Awards
2021; 23rd Quebec Cinema Awards	Johanne Paiement	Goddess of the Fireflies (La déesse des mouches à feu)	
2021; 23rd Quebec Cinema Awards	Michelle Côté	My Salinger Year (Mon année Salinger)	
2021; 23rd Quebec Cinema Awards	Stéphanie DeFlandre	My Very Own Circus (Mon cirque à moi)	
2021; 23rd Quebec Cinema Awards	André Duval	The Vinland Club (Le Club Vinland)	
2021; 23rd Quebec Cinema Awards	Marcelo Nestor Padovani	Blood Quantum	
2022; 24th Quebec Cinema Awards
2022; 24th Quebec Cinema Awards	Martin Lapointe	Maria Chapdelaine	
2022; 24th Quebec Cinema Awards	Frédéric Bélanger	Brain Freeze	
2022; 24th Quebec Cinema Awards	Lyne Lapiana, Sandrine Masson, Silvine Picard, Rémy Pilot	Aline	
2022; 24th Quebec Cinema Awards	Janie Otis	The Time Thief (L'arracheuse de temps)	
2022; 24th Quebec Cinema Awards	Pamela Warden	Beans	
2023; 25th Quebec Cinema Awards
2023; 25th Quebec Cinema Awards	Richard Hansen, Réjean Forget, Johanne Hansen	Victoire (La Cordonnière)	
2023; 25th Quebec Cinema Awards	Vincent Dufault	Viking	
2023; 25th Quebec Cinema Awards	André Duval	A Respectable Woman (Une femme respectable)	
2023; 25th Quebec Cinema Awards	Nermin Grbic	Red Rooms (Les Chambres rouges)	
2023; 25th Quebec Cinema Awards	Ann-Louise Landry	Babysitter	
2024; 26th Quebec Cinema Awards
2024; 26th Quebec Cinema Awards	Daniel Jacob	Sisters and Neighbors! (Nos belles-sœurs)	
2024; 26th Quebec Cinema Awards	Nermin Grbic	Solo	
2024; 26th Quebec Cinema Awards	Jean-Luc Lapierre	Humanist Vampire Seeking Consenting Suicidal Person (Vampire humaniste cherche suicidaire consentant)	
2024; 26th Quebec Cinema Awards	Jean-Luc Lapierre, André Duval	Tell Me Why These Things Are So Beautiful (Dis-moi pourquoi ces choses sont si belles)	
2024; 26th Quebec Cinema Awards	Marcelo Nestor Padovani	Ababooned (Ababouiné)	
2025; 27th Quebec Cinema Awards
2025; 27th Quebec Cinema Awards	Jeanne Milon	Once Upon My Mother (Ma mère, Dieu et Sylvie Vartan)	
2025; 27th Quebec Cinema Awards	Vincent Dufault	Two Women (Deux femmes en or)	
2025; 27th Quebec Cinema Awards	Nermin Grbic	Peak Everything (Amour apocalypse)	
2025; 27th Quebec Cinema Awards	Nermin Grbic	Universal Language (Une langue universelle)	
2025; 27th Quebec Cinema Awards	Jonathan Paulin	Vile & Miserable (Vil & Misérable)	

== Multiple wins and nominations ==
=== Multiple wins ===
Wins	Hairstylist
7	Martin Lapointe
3	Réjean Forget
2	Michelle Côté
2	Daniel Jacob
2	Réjean Goderre

=== Three or more nominations ===
Nominations	Hairstylist
15	Martin Lapointe
10	Denis Parent
9	Réjean Goderre
7	André Duval
5	Réjean Forget
5	Nermin Grbic
4	Michelle Côté
4	Daniel Jacob
4	Ann-Louise Landry
4	Marcelo Padovani
4	Johanne Paiement
3	Jean-Luc Lapierre

== See also ==
- Canadian Screen Award for Best Hair
