= Nathalie Boutrie =

Canadian casting director

Nathalie Boutrie is a Canadian casting director from Quebec. She is most noted as a two-time winner of the Prix Iris for Best Casting, winning at the 20th Quebec Cinema Awards in 2018 for Cross My Heart (Les rois mongols), and at the 24th Quebec Cinema Awards in 2022 for Drunken Birds (Les oiseaux ivres). She is to date the most-nominated casting director in the history of the category, as well as the only casting director ever to have won the award more than once.

== Filmography ==
=== Film ===
- CQ2 (Seek You Too) - 2004
- Looking for Alexander (Mémoires affectives) - 2004
- Audition (L'Audition) - 2005
- May God Bless America (Que Dieu bénisse l'Amérique) - 2006
- Deliver Me (Délivrez-moi) - 2007
- In the Cities (Dans les villes) - 2006
- The Ring (Le Ring) - 2007
- Everything Is Fine (Tout est parfait) - 2008
- In a Galaxy Near You 2 (Dans une galaxie près de chez vous 2) - 2008
- Facing Champlain: A Work in 3 Dimensions (Champlain retracé) - 2008
- A No-Hit No-Run Summer (Un été sans point ni coup sûr) - 2008
- It's Not Me, I Swear! (C'est pas moi, je le jure !) - 2008
- Behind Me (Derrière moi) - 2008
- The Deserter (Le Déserteur) - 2008
- Polytechnique - 2009
- Tomorrow (Demain) - 2009
- Route 132 - 2010
- 10½ - 2010
- Romeo Eleven (Roméo Onze) - 2011
- See How They Dance (Voyez comme ils dansent) - 2011
- Monsieur Lazhar - 2011
- Winter Passed (Après la neige) - 2012
- Inch'Allah - 2012
- L'Affaire Dumont - 2012
- Before My Heart Falls (Avant que mon cœur bascule) - 2012
- The Pee-Wee 3D: The Winter That Changed My Life (Les Pee-Wee 3D: L'hiver qui a changé ma vie) - 2012
- Rock Paper Scissors (Roche papier ciseaux) - 2013
- Amsterdam - 2013
- Miraculum - 2014
- Mommy - 2014
- Gurov and Anna - 2014
- Henri Henri - 2014
- Aurélie Laflamme: Somewhat Grounded (Aurélie Laflamme: Les pieds sur terre) - 2015
- The Sound of Trees (Le Bruit des arbres) - 2015
- Our Loved Ones (Les êtres chers) - 2015
- Bad Seeds (Les Mauvaises Herbes) - 2016
- Kokoro (Le cœur régulier) - 2016
- King Dave - 2016
- A Kid (Le Fils de Jean) - 2016
- Nelly - 2016
- The Cyclotron (Le Cyclotron) - 2016
- Cross My Heart (Les rois mongols) - 2017
- The Little Girl Who Was Too Fond of Matches (La petite fille qui aimait trop les allumettes) - 2017
- Major Junior (Junior Majeur) - 2017
- Threesome (Le Trip à trois) - 2017
- The Fall of Sparta (La chute de Sparte) - 2018
- A Brother's Love (La femme de mon frère) - 2019
- Young Juliette (Jeune Juliette) - 2019
- Mafia Inc. - 2019
- Living 100 MPH (Vivre à 100 milles à l'heure) - 2019
- The Acrobat (L'Acrobate) - 2019
- Apapacho - 2019
- 14 Days, 12 Nights (14 jours 12 nuits) - 2019
- Aline - 2021
- Brain Freeze - 2021
- The Inhuman (L'Inhumain) - 2021
- Drunken Birds (Les oiseaux ivres) - 2021
- Family Game (Arseneault et fils) - 2022
- Ru - 2023
- Dusk for a Hitman (Crépuscule pour un tueur) - 2023
- My Mother's Men (Les hommes de ma mère) - 2023
- Evergreen$ (Sapin$) - 2023

=== Television ===
- Grande Ourse - 2004
- Le cœur a ses raisons - 2005
- Les Invincibles - 2005
- Minuit, le soir - 2005-07
- Pure laine - 2006-08
- The Parent Family (Les Parent) - 2008-15
- Trauma - 2010-13
- Apparences - 2012
- Vertige - 2012
- Tu m'aimes-tu? - 2012
- Mon meilleur ami - 2013
- Nouvelle adresse - 2014-15
- Les Jeunes loups - 2014-15
- Comment devenir une légende - 2016
- Legacy, a Kate McDougall Investigation - 2016
- L'Échappée - 2016
- Fatale-Station - 2016-17
- Le Jeu - 2018
- Discussions avec mes parents - 2018
- Can You Hear Me? (M'entends-tu?) - 2018-19
- Marika - 2018-20
- Appelle-moi si tu meurs - 2019
- Les Mutants - 2020
- Audrey est revenue - 2021
- Alertes - 2023-24

== Awards ==
Award	Year	Category	Work	Result	Ref(s)
Prix Iris	2017	Best Casting	Bad Seeds (Les Mauvaises Herbes) with Emanuelle Beaugrand-Champagne	Nominated	
Prix Iris	2018	Best Casting	Cross My Heart (Les rois mongols) with Emanuelle Beaugrand-Champagne, Frédérique Proulx	Won	
Prix Iris	2019	Best Casting	The Fall of Sparta (La chute de Sparte)	Nominated	
Prix Iris	2020	Best Casting	Young Juliette (Jeune Juliette)	Nominated	
Prix Iris	2020	Best Casting	Mafia Inc. with Francis Cantin, Bruno Rosato	Nominated	
Prix Iris	2022	Best Casting	Drunken Birds (Les oiseaux ivres)	Won	
Prix Iris	2022	Best Casting	Aline	Nominated	
Prix Iris	2023	Best Casting	Family Game (Arseneault et fils)	Nominated	
Prix Iris	2024	Best Casting	Ru	Nominated	
