= Humanist Vampire Seeking Consenting Suicidal Person =

2023 film by Ariane Louis-Seize

- Theatrical release poster
- French: Vampire humaniste cherche suicidaire consentant
- Directed by: Ariane Louis-Seize
- Written by: Ariane Louis-Seize; Christine Doyon
- Produced by: Jeanne-Marie Poulain; Line Sander Egede
- Starring: Sara Montpetit; Félix-Antoine Bénard; Steve Laplante; Sophie Cadieux; Noémie O'Farrell; Marie Brassard; Patrick Hivon; Marc Beaupré
- Cinematography: Shawn Pavlin
- Edited by: Stéphane Lafleur
- Music by: Pierre-Philippe Côté
- Production company: Art et Essai
- Distributed by: H264
- Release dates: September 3, 2023 (Venice); October 13, 2023 (Canada)
- Running time: 91 minutes
- Country: Canada
- Language: French
- Box office: $104,189

Humanist Vampire Seeking Consenting Suicidal Person (French: Vampire humaniste cherche suicidaire consentant), also released as Humanist Vampire Too Sensitive to Kill, is a 2023 French-language Canadian vampire comedy drama film co-written and directed by Ariane Louis-Seize. It stars Sara Montpetit as Sasha, a teenage vampire who befriends Paul (Félix-Antoine Bénard), a boy with suicidal tendencies.

== Plot ==
In her childhood, Sasha, a vampire, is traumatized after her family attacks and eats a clown they had hired to perform at her birthday. As a result, Sasha's fangs do not sprout and she is uncomfortable with the idea of killing people for food. Years later, she still refuses to kill and still does not have fangs.

One night, Sasha notices a teenager, Paul, contemplating suicide by jumping from a building, but he eventually does not. Later, Sasha's fangs suddenly emerge when she encounters him again. In a panic, she runs back home where her parents have decided that she will live with her older cousin, Denise, to learn how to hunt people.

They lure a man, JP, but Sasha is reluctant to learn and attracts attention as Denise feeds on him, distracting her and causing him to turn into a vampire. She reunites with Paul at a support group meeting for people experiencing suicidal thoughts. After the meeting, the two agree to help each other with Sasha assisting in his suicide and feeding on him. However, Sasha's fangs disappear, and she tries to stall by asking him if he has a dying wish. Paul says he would like to get payback on Henry, his co-worker who constantly bullies him.

When they find out that Henry has gone to a party, Paul becomes hesitant about getting payback in front of everyone. Sasha suggests he could practice to boost his confidence. Paul then decides to get payback on a popular girl at school, his gym teacher, and his principal.

At the party, Henry taunts Paul, and Paul bites his hand. As they run away, Sasha collapses from hunger. Paul then cuts his hand to feed her his blood. Henry and his friends find them and start beating Paul up. Sasha's fangs suddenly emerge, and she kills Henry and urges Paul to go home.

Denise demands Paul must also be killed while she helps Sasha bury Henry's body, but Sasha knocks Denise out. Sasha runs to Paul and they decide to run away, but at a hotel room, Paul doubts their success. He urges Sasha to turn him into a vampire. After being persuaded, she bites him, turning him into a vampire, but he starts struggling to breathe. Sasha calls her family, who are able to save him by feeding him a bloodbag.

Some time later, Sasha and Paul arrive at a hospice where Pauls' mother works. They are directed to a terminally ill patient's room. Sasha plays the keyboard for the patient as Paul drains the patient's blood into a bag.

== Cast ==
- Sara Montpetit as Sasha
  - Lilas-Rose Cantin as Sasha at 6 years old
- Félix-Antoine Bénard as Paul
- Steve Laplante as Aurélien, Sasha's father
- Sophie Cadieux as Georgette, Sasha's mother
- Noémie O'Farrell as Denise
  - Valence Laroche as Denise at 12 years old
- Arnaud Vachon as Henry
- Marie Brassard as Victorine, Sasha's aunt
- Madeleine Péloquin as Sandrine, Paul's mother
- Gabriel-Antoine Roy as JP
- Isabella Villalba as Mélisse Bessette
- Patrick Hivon as Coach Goyette
- Marc Beaupré as Rico-Berlingot
- Micheline Bernard as Principal Gauvin
- Sylvie Lemay as Renaude
- Ariane Castellanos as Claudie

== Production ==
Humanist Vampire Seeking Consenting Suicidal Person was shot in fall 2022 in Montreal.

== Release ==
Humanist Vampire Seeking Consenting Suicidal Person premiered at the 80th Venice International Film Festival on September 3, 2023. The film had its Canadian premiere in the Centrepiece program at the 2023 Toronto International Film Festival, and received a gala screening at the 2023 Cinéfest Sudbury International Film Festival. It also screened in the Noves Visions section at the 56th Sitges Film Festival. The film was released in Canada on October 13, 2023, by H264. Drafthouse Films acquired distribution rights for the United States, with the film being released in Los Angeles and New York City on June 21, 2024, before expanding to more cities the following week.

== Reception ==
=== Critical response ===
On the review aggregator website Rotten Tomatoes, 90% of 80 critics' reviews are positive, with an average rating of 7/10. The website's consensus reads: "While not as innovative as its title, Humanist Vampire Seeking Consenting Suicidal Person offers a dark-ish comedic take on a teen love story between misfits that renders a strangely sweet bite." Metacritic, which uses a weighted average, assigned the film a score of 70 out of 100, based on 8 critics, indicating "generally favorable" reviews.

Nikki Baughan of Screen Daily wrote that "Louis-Seize leans heavily into European arthouse influences for her French-language production. Sasha—who is, in fact 68 (although still a teenager in human years)—is presented as something of an ingenue, her long dark hair, blunt fringe and doe eyes giving her both a vulnerability and an intriguing edge. She listens to vinyl, she plays the keyboard, she is by nature (and necessity) a loner. Her connection with Paul is immediate and surprising, and the chemistry between the two is authentic."

The film was included in TIFF's annual Canada's Top Ten list for 2023.

=== Accolades ===
| Award / Film Festival | Date of ceremony | Category | Recipient(s) | Result | Ref(s) |
|---|---|---|---|---|---|
| Venice International Film Festival | September 9, 2023 | Giornate degli Autori, Best Director | Ariane Louis-Seize | Won | |
| Calgary International Film Festival | September 25, 2023 | RBC Emerging Canadian Artist | Ariane Louis-Seize | Won | |
| Calgary International Film Festival | October 3, 2023 | Audience Choice Award, Canadian Narrative Feature | Humanist Vampire Seeking Consenting Suicidal Person | Won | |
| Cinéfest Sudbury International Film Festival | September 28, 2023 | Best French-Language Feature Film | Humanist Vampire Seeking Consenting Suicidal Person | Won | |
| Festival du nouveau cinéma | October 15, 2023 | National Competition, Grand Prize | Humanist Vampire Seeking Consenting Suicidal Person | Won | |
| Directors Guild of Canada | October 21, 2023 | Jean-Marc Vallée DGC Discovery Award | Ariane Louis-Seize | Won | |
| Windsor International Film Festival | October 29, 2023 | WIFF Prize in Canadian Film | Ariane Louis-Seize | Won | |
| Vancouver Film Critics Circle | February 12, 2024 | Best Canadian Film | Humanist Vampire Seeking Consenting Suicidal Person | Nominated | |
| Vancouver Film Critics Circle | February 12, 2024 | Best Female Actor in a Canadian Film | Sara Montpetit | Won | |
| Vancouver Film Critics Circle | February 12, 2024 | One to Watch | Ariane Louis-Seize | Won | |
| Toronto Film Critics Association | March 4, 2024 | Rogers Best Canadian Film Award | Ariane Louis-Seize | Nominated | |
| Prix collégial du cinéma québécois | April 5, 2024 | Best Film | Ariane Louis-Seize | Nominated | |
| Canadian Screen Awards | 2024 | Best Picture | Jeanne-Marie Poulain, Line Sander Egede | Nominated | |
| Canadian Screen Awards | 2024 | Best Director | Ariane Louis-Seize | Nominated | |
| Canadian Screen Awards | 2024 | Best Lead Performance in a Comedy Film | Félix-Antoine Bénard | Nominated | |
| Canadian Screen Awards | 2024 | Best Lead Performance in a Comedy Film | Sara Montpetit | Nominated | |
| Canadian Screen Awards | 2024 | Best Supporting Performance in a Comedy Film | Steve Laplante | Nominated | |
| Canadian Screen Awards | 2024 | Best Supporting Performance in a Comedy Film | Noémie O'Farrell | Nominated | |
| Canadian Screen Awards | 2024 | Best Original Screenplay | Ariane Louis-Seize, Christine Doyon | Won | |
| Canadian Screen Awards | 2024 | Best Art Direction/Production Design | Ludovic Dufresne | Nominated | |
| Canadian Screen Awards | 2024 | Best Costume Design | Kelly-Anne Bonieux | Nominated | |
| Canadian Screen Awards | 2024 | Best Editing | Stéphane Lafleur | Nominated | |
| Canadian Screen Awards | 2024 | Best Casting in a Film | Tania Arana | Nominated | |
| Canadian Screen Awards | 2024 | John Dunning Best First Feature | Ariane Louis-Seize | Nominated | |
| Prix Iris | December 8, 2024 | Best Film | Jeanne-Marie Poulain, Line Sander Egede | Won | |
| Prix Iris | December 8, 2024 | Best Director | Ariane Louis-Seize | Nominated | |
| Prix Iris | December 8, 2024 | Best Actor | Félix-Antoine Bénard | Nominated | |
| Prix Iris | December 8, 2024 | Best Actress | Sara Montpetit | Nominated | |
| Prix Iris | December 8, 2024 | Best Supporting Actor | Steve Laplante | Nominated | |
| Prix Iris | December 8, 2024 | Best Supporting Actress | Marie Brassard | Nominated | |
| Prix Iris | December 8, 2024 | Best Supporting Actress | Sophie Cadieux | Nominated | |
| Prix Iris | December 8, 2024 | Best Supporting Actress | Noémie O'Farrell | Nominated | |
| Prix Iris | December 8, 2024 | Revelation of the Year | Félix-Antoine Bénard | Nominated | |
| Prix Iris | December 8, 2024 | Best Screenplay | Ariane Louis-Seize, Christine Doyon | Won | |
| Prix Iris | December 8, 2024 | Best Art Direction | Ludovic Dufresne | Won | |
| Prix Iris | December 8, 2024 | Best Costume Design | Kelly-Anne Bonieux | Nominated | |
| Prix Iris | December 8, 2024 | Best Cinematography | Shawn Pavlin | Nominated | |
| Prix Iris | December 8, 2024 | Best Editing | Stéphane Lafleur | Won | |
| Prix Iris | December 8, 2024 | Best Original Music | Pierre-Philippe Côté | Nominated | |
| Prix Iris | December 8, 2024 | Best Sound | Marie-Pierre Grenier, Simon Gervais, Luc Boudrias, Thierry Bourgault D'Amico | Won | |
| Prix Iris | December 8, 2024 | Best Hairstyling | Jean-Luc Lapierre | Nominated | |
| Prix Iris | December 8, 2024 | Best Makeup | Tania Guarnaccia | Nominated | |
| Prix Iris | December 8, 2024 | Best Visual Effects | Marie-Claude Lafontaine, Jean-François Ferland, Simon Beaupré | Won | |
| Prix Iris | December 8, 2024 | Best Casting | Tania Arana | Won | |
| Prix Iris | December 8, 2024 | Most Successful Film Outside Quebec | Jeanne-Marie Poulain, Line Sander Egede, Ariane Louis-Seize, Christine Doyon, Stéphanie Demers, Jean-Christophe J. Lamontagne | Nominated | |
| Prix Iris | December 8, 2024 | Best First Film | Ariane Louis-Seize | Won | |
