= Kelly-Anne Bonieux =

Canadian costume designer

Kelly-Anne Bonieux is a Canadian costume designer from Quebec. She is most noted for her work on the film Humanist Vampire Seeking Consenting Suicidal Person (Vampire humaniste cherche suicidaire consentant), for which she received a Canadian Screen Award nomination for Best Costume Design at the 12th Canadian Screen Awards in 2024.

A graduate of the screenwriting program at the Institut national de l'image et du son, she was one of the writers of the 2016 film Of Ink and Blood (D'Encre et de sang), but has worked principally in costume design. Her other credits as a costume designer have included the films The Colour of Your Lips (La couleur de tes lèvres), Little Waves (Les petites vagues), Like a House on Fire, North of Albany (Au nord d'Albany), Death to the Bikini! (À mort le bikini!) and Richelieu.
