= Dead Leaves (2016 film) =

- French: Feuilles mortes
- Directed by: Thierry Bouffard; Steve "Carnior" Landry; Édouard Albernhe Tremblay
- Written by: Thierry Bouffard; Steve "Carnior" Landry; Édouard Albernhe Tremblay
- Produced by: Jean-François Dugal; Éric Denis; Charles Gaudreau
- Starring: Roy Dupuis; Noémie O'Farrell; Philippe Racine
- Cinematography: François Gamache
- Edited by: Jason Arbour
- Music by: Mathieu Campagna
- Production company: Élément
- Distributed by: Distfilm
- Release date: July 29, 2016 (Fantasia)
- Running time: 103 minutes
- Country: Canada
- Language: French

Dead Leaves (French: Feuilles mortes) is a Canadian science fiction film, directed by Thierry Bouffard, Steve "Carnior" Landry and Édouard Albernhe Tremblay, and released in 2016.

Set in a post-apocalyptic world where civil society has largely collapsed and the relatively few remaining survivors are largely living in gangs fighting for resources, the film centres on the stories of Bob (Roy Dupuis), an itinerant gun-toting loner searching for his brother; Marianne (Noémie O'Farrell), a woman searching for refuge with her aunt (Marie-Ginette Guay) after much of her family have been massacred by the gangs; and Léon (Philippe Racine), a gang member undertaking a dangerous journey back to his former home.

The cast also includes Audrey Rancourt-Lessard, Mélody Minville, Jacques Laroche, Eliot Laprise, Serge Bonin, Éric Leblanc, Louis Tremblay, Martin Laroche, Lucien Ratio, Charles-Étienne Beauline, Jean-Michel Girouard, Sylvain Brosseau, Pierre-Luc Fontaine, Nicolas Paquin, Claude Vallières, Patrick Lauzon, Annie Gignac, Vincent Champoux, Michael Kelly, Marc Poirier, François Aubin, André Beaupré, Étienne Bouchard, Lise Castonguay and Hugo Girard in supporting roles.

The film was shot in fall 2015, in rural areas near Quebec City.

The film premiered at the 2016 Fantasia Film Festival, where it was the winner of the Barry Convex Award for Best Canadian Film. It was later screened at the Rhode Island International Film Festival, where it won the First Jury Prize for feature films.
