= My Friend Dino =

2016 Canadian docufiction film

- Film poster
- French: Mon ami Dino
- Directed by: Jimmy Larouche
- Written by: Jimmy Larouche
- Produced by: Jimmy Larouche; Renouf Williams; David-Olivier St-Denis
- Starring: Dino Tavarone; Michel Côté; Sasha Migliarese; Manuel Tadros
- Cinematography: Mathieu Chouinard
- Edited by: Mathieu Demers; Jimmy Larouche
- Music by: Manuel Gasse
- Production companies: Alma Films; GreenGround Productions
- Distributed by: Maison 4:3
- Release date: August 1, 2016
- Running time: 84 minutes
- Country: Canada
- Language: French

My Friend Dino (French: Mon ami Dino) is a Canadian docufiction film, directed by Jimmy Larouche and released in 2016. A fictionalized documentary about the life of Dino Tavarone, who spent four years in prison for drug trafficking before finding fame playing a mafia boss in the television series Omertà in the 1990s, the film focuses on his life in his 70s as he battles a serious illness.

The film's cast also includes Michel Côté, Manuel Tadros, Joëlle Morin and Sasha Migliarese. Côté, Tadros and Morin played versions of themselves, while Migliarese played Tavarone's daughter Meredith.

Migliarese received a Prix Iris nomination for Revelation of the Year at the 19th Quebec Cinema Awards in 2017.
