= Ariane Louis-Seize =

Canadian film director and screenwriter

Ariane Louis-Seize is a Canadian film director and screenwriter from Quebec. She is best known for her debut feature film Humanist Vampire Seeking Consenting Suicidal Person (Vampire humaniste cherche suicidaire consentant), which was released in 2023 and debuted at the 80th Venice International Film Festival. Many of Louis-Seize's films feature coming of age narratives or offer an exploration of girlhood, through the use of monsters and eerie forces.

== Early life and education ==
Louis-Seize is from Gatineau, Quebec. She attended the Institut national de l'image et du son (INIS), a film school in Montreal, which she graduated from in 2013. She currently works out of Montreal.

== Career ==
=== Short films ===
Louis-Seize's debut short film, Wild Skin (La Peau sauvage), which was released in 2016, follows a woman's erotic experience after discovering a python snake in her apartment. The film was a nominee for Best Live Action Short Drama at the 5th Canadian Screen Awards and a Prix Iris nominee for Best Short Film at the 19th Quebec Cinema Awards. In the same year, she was one of the writers of the screenplay Of Ink and Blood (D'Encre et de sang), which follows a man who, after witnessing a deadly accident, steals the victim's manuscript, claiming it as his own.

Her second short film, Little Waves (Les petites vagues), was named in the Toronto International Film Festival's annual Canada's Top Ten list in 2018, its year of release. The film follows a young girl's sexual awakening one summer. Louis-Seize also released the short film Rituels in 2018.

Her third short film, The Depths (Les profondeurs), premiered at the 2019 Toronto International Film Festival. It was subsequently screened at the Cinéfest Sudbury International Film Festival, where it won the Audience Choice Award for Best Short Film. The film chronicles a woman's journey scuba diving in a lake while grieving her mother's death.

She followed this up in 2020 with Shooting Star (Comme une comète), which explores the relationship between a teenage girl and her mother's boyfriend. It was screened at the Abitibi-Témiscamingue International Film Festival, where it won the Prix Télébec, and at the Whistler Film Festival, where it won the award for Best Canadian ShortWork. The film received a Prix Iris nomination for Best Live Action Short Film at the 23rd Quebec Cinema Awards in 2021.

=== Feature film ===
Her debut feature film, Humanist Vampire Seeking Consenting Suicidal Person (Vampire humaniste cherche suicidaire consentant), entered production in 2022, and premiered at the 80th Venice International Film Festival in 2023. The film follows a 68-year-old 'teenage' vampire named Sasha who is unable to kill humans to sustain herself, and searches for a consenting suicidal person to quench her thirst and make her family proud. The film stars Sara Montpetit as Sasha, the vampire, and Félix-Antoine Bénard as Paul, the suicidal victim. It was screened at the Toronto International Film Festival (TIFF), the Thessaloniki Film Festival, and the Vancouver International Film Festival.

== Influences and style ==
Louis-Seize has cited Ana Lily Amirpour, Paul Thomas Anderson, Jim Jarmusch, the Coen Brothers, Sofia Coppola, Jane Campion, Roy Andersson, and Marielle Heller as influences for her films. A journalist from Ciné Bulles has noted her work is reminiscent of Wes Anderson and painter Edvard Munch. She was described by a reviewer from Screen International as having been influenced by European arthouse films. She has cited the films Only Lovers Left Alive (2013), The Diary of a Teenage Girl (2015), and The Hunger (1983) as particular cinematic influences. She is also influenced by German expressionist cinema.

Louis-Seize's work is known for exploring themes of girlhood, sexual awakening, and coming-of-age through the use of supernatural forces and eerie settings, which act as metaphors for the journeys of her characters. She plays with contradictions and dualities, finding a middle ground between desire and disgust, or comedy and horror. She is also known to play with themes of isolation, as well as desire for connection and normalcy. Her films have been described as atmospheric in their use of colour. She employs neon blues and greens, and darker jewel tones, like blood reds, which contribute to the gothic quality of her films.

== Accolades ==
Louis-Seize won the award for Best Director at the Giornate degli Autori (Venice Days in English), an independent subsection of the Venice International Film Festival. She also won accolades at the Cinéfest Sudbury International Film Festival, the Directors Guild of Canada, Festival du nouveau cinéma, and the Windsor International Film Festival. She won the RBC Emerging Artist Award at the Calgary International Film Festival, in which she received a $10,000 prize. In 2024, she was named the winner of the Toronto Film Critics Association's Jay Scott Prize. She won the Canadian Screen Award for Best Original Screenplay at the 12th Canadian Screen Awards, along with co-writer Christine Doyon. She also won the Prix Iris for Best Screenplay at the 26th Quebec Cinema Awards.

In 2024, she served as a jury member for the Prix Cheval Noir award ceremony at the 28th Fantasia International Film Festival.

== Filmography ==
Short film

Year	Title	Director	Writer
2016	Wild Skin	Yes	Yes
2018	Little Waves	Yes	Yes
2018	Rituels	Yes	Yes
2019	The Depths	Yes	Yes
2020	Shooting Star	Yes	Yes

Feature film

Year	Title	Director	Writer
2016	Of Ink and Blood	No	Yes
2023	Humanist Vampire Seeking Consenting Suicidal Person	Yes	Yes
