= Prix Iris for Best Casting =

Annual Canadian film award

The Prix Iris for Best Casting (French: Prix Iris de la meilleure distribution des rôles) is an annual film award, presented by Québec Cinéma as part of its Prix Iris awards program, to honour the year's best casting in films made within the Cinema of Quebec.

The award was presented for the first time at the 19th Quebec Cinema Awards in 2017.

Nathalie Boutrie received the most nominations, eleven, and is the only casting director to receive two awards. Six casting directors received nominations for films they also directed: Xavier Dolan, Denis Côté, Kristina Wagenbauer, Sophie Deraspe, Myriam Verreault and Henry Bernadet. Of those, Xavier Dolan and Sophie Deraspe won the award.

Ariane Castellanos holds the distinction of being the only person to receive an acting nomination for a film where she also was the casting director. For her performance in Richelieu, she received dual nominations for Best Actress and Revelation of the Year, as well as a nomination for Best Casting.

== 2010s ==
Year	Casting director(s)	Film	Ref
2017; 19th Quebec Cinema Awards
2017; 19th Quebec Cinema Awards	Xavier Dolan	It's Only the End of the World (Juste la fin du monde)	
2017; 19th Quebec Cinema Awards	Emanuelle Beaugrand-Champagne, Nathalie Boutrie	Bad Seeds (Les Mauvaises Herbes)	
2017; 19th Quebec Cinema Awards	Lucie Robitaille, Heidi Levitt	Two Lovers and a Bear	
2018; 20th Quebec Cinema Awards
2018; 20th Quebec Cinema Awards	Emanuelle Beaugrand-Champagne, Nathalie Boutrie, Frédérique Proulx	Cross My Heart (Les rois mongols)	
2018; 20th Quebec Cinema Awards	Maxime Giroux, Jonathan Oliveira	Boost	
2018; 20th Quebec Cinema Awards	Lucie Robitaille	Slut in a Good Way (Charlotte a du fun)	
2019; 21st Quebec Cinema Awards
2019; 21st Quebec Cinema Awards	Ariane Castellanos	A Colony (Une colonie)	
2019; 21st Quebec Cinema Awards	Nathalie Boutrie	The Fall of Sparta (La chute de Sparte)	
2019; 21st Quebec Cinema Awards	Chloé Cinq-Mars	The Far Shore (Dérive)	
2019; 21st Quebec Cinema Awards	Denis Côté	Ghost Town Anthology (Répertoire des villes disparues)	
2019; 21st Quebec Cinema Awards	Nolwenn Daste, Fanny Rainville, Kristina Wagenbauer	Sashinka	

== 2020s ==
Year	Casting director(s)	Film	Ref
2020; 22nd Quebec Cinema Awards
2020; 22nd Quebec Cinema Awards	Sophie Deraspe, Isabelle Couture, Pierre Pageau, Daniel Poisson	Antigone	
2020; 22nd Quebec Cinema Awards	Jacinthe Beaudet, Tobie Fraser, Geneviève Hébert, Myriam Verreault	Kuessipan	
2020; 22nd Quebec Cinema Awards	Nathalie Boutrie	Young Juliette (Jeune Juliette)	
2020; 22nd Quebec Cinema Awards	Nathalie Boutrie, Francis Cantin, Bruno Rosato	Mafia Inc.	
2020; 22nd Quebec Cinema Awards	Karel Quinn, Lucie Robitaille	And the Birds Rained Down (Il pleuvait des oiseaux)	
2021; 23rd Quebec Cinema Awards
2021; 23rd Quebec Cinema Awards	Murielle La Ferrière, Marie-Claude Robitaille	Goddess of the Fireflies (La déesse des mouches à feu)	
2021; 23rd Quebec Cinema Awards	Deirdre Bowen, Heidi Levitt, Bruno Rosato, Supattra Punyadee	Target Number One	
2021; 23rd Quebec Cinema Awards	Marjolaine Lachance	Our Own (Les nôtres)	
2021; 23rd Quebec Cinema Awards	Marjolaine Lachance	Underground (Souterrain)	
2021; 23rd Quebec Cinema Awards	Pierre Pageau, Daniel Poisson	The Vinland Club (Le club Vinland)	
2022; 24th Quebec Cinema Awards
2022; 24th Quebec Cinema Awards	Nathalie Boutrie	Drunken Birds (Les oiseaux ivres)	
2022; 24th Quebec Cinema Awards	Isabelle Thez Axelrad, Brigitte Viau	The Time Thief (L'arracheuse de temps)	
2022; 24th Quebec Cinema Awards	Nathalie Boutrie	Aline	
2022; 24th Quebec Cinema Awards	Maxime Giroux, Rene Haynes	Beans	
2022; 24th Quebec Cinema Awards	Pierre Pageau, Daniel Poisson	Maria Chapdelaine	
2023; 25th Quebec Cinema Awards
2023; 25th Quebec Cinema Awards	Lucie Robitaille, Dandy Thibaudeau	Viking	
2023; 25th Quebec Cinema Awards	Nathalie Boutrie	Family Game (Arseneault et fils)	
2023; 25th Quebec Cinema Awards	Marilou Richer	Red Rooms (Les Chambres rouges)	
2023; 25th Quebec Cinema Awards	Annie St-Pierre, Antoinette Boulat	Babysitter	
2023; 25th Quebec Cinema Awards	Brigitte Viau	The Dishwasher (Le Plongeur)	
2024; 26th Quebec Cinema Awards
2024; 26th Quebec Cinema Awards	Tania Arana	Humanist Vampire Seeking Consenting Suicidal Person (Vampire humaniste cherche suicidaire consentant)	
2024; 26th Quebec Cinema Awards	Henry Bernadet, Marie-Anne Sergerie, Victor Tremblay-Blouin	Gamma Rays (Les Rayons gamma)	
2024; 26th Quebec Cinema Awards	Nathalie Boutrie, Geneviève Hébert	Ru	
2024; 26th Quebec Cinema Awards	Ariane Castellanos	Richelieu	
2024; 26th Quebec Cinema Awards	Karel Quinn	1995	
2024; 26th Quebec Cinema Awards	Annie St-Pierre	The Nature of Love (Simple comme Sylvain)	
2025; 27th Quebec Cinema Awards
2025; 27th Quebec Cinema Awards	Marilou Richer, Ila Firouzabadi	Universal Language (Une langue universelle)	
2025; 27th Quebec Cinema Awards	Nathalie Boutrie, Hannah Antaki, Jon Comerford	Peak Everything (Amour apocalypse)	
2025; 27th Quebec Cinema Awards	Catherine Didelot, Maxime Giroux, Constance Demontoy	Who by Fire (Comme le feu)	
2025; 27th Quebec Cinema Awards	Adélaïde Mauvernay, Nathalie Boutrie	Shepherds (Bergers)	
2025; 27th Quebec Cinema Awards	Karel Quinn, Lucie Llopis	Two Women (Deux femmes en or)	

== Multiple wins and nominations ==
=== Multiple wins ===
Wins	Casting Director
2	Nathalie Boutrie

=== Three or more nominations ===
Nominations	Casting Director
11	Nathalie Boutrie
4	Lucie Robitaille
3	Maxime Giroux
3	Pierre Pageau
3	Daniel Poisson
3	Karel Quinn

== See also ==
- Canadian Screen Award for Best Casting in a Film
