= Lévi Doré =

Canadian actor

Lévi Doré (born 2000) is a Canadian actor from Quebec. He is most noted for his performance in the film The Fall of Sparta (La chute de sparte), for which he received a Prix Iris nomination for Revelation of the Year at the 21st Quebec Cinema Awards.

He has also appeared in the films Pauvre Georges! and Sam, and in the television series Au secours de Béatrice and Alerte amber.

In 2022, he played Sandrick, one of the main characters in the series Chouchou, written by Simon Boulerice.

== Nominations ==
Nomination Zapettes d'Or, catégorie Personage fictif le mieux interprété pour Chouchou / 2023

Nomination Gémeaux, catégorie Meilleur rôle de soutien masculin : Série dramatique pour Chaos / 2022

Nomination Gémeaux, catégorie Meilleur rôle de soutien masculin : Jeunesse pour Les petits rois / 2022

Nomination Gala Québec Cinéma, catégorie Révélation de l'année pour La Chute de Sparte / 2019

== Roles ==
Lévi Doré incarne le personage principal dans une nouvelle fiction intitulée Casse-toi! Il y incarne Oli, un jeune homme qui s'installe à Montréal chez sa mère Manon, jouée par la talentueuse Sandrine Bisson. Il tentera alors de renouer avec son meilleur ami d'enfance, Malik, mais ça ne se passera pas comme prévu.
