= My Very Own Circus =

- Film poster
- French: Mon cirque à moi
- Directed by: Miryam Bouchard
- Written by: Miryam Bouchard; Martin Forget
- Produced by: Antonello Cozzolino
- Starring: Patrick Huard; Jasmine Lemée; Sophie Lorain
- Cinematography: Ronald Plante
- Edited by: Valérie Héroux
- Production company: Attraction Images
- Distributed by: Les Films Séville
- Release date: August 14, 2020
- Running time: 100 minutes
- Country: Canada
- Language: French

My Very Own Circus (French: Mon cirque à moi) is a 2020 Canadian comedy-drama film directed by Miryam Bouchard. The film stars Jasmine Lemée as Laura, a young girl who has spent years living an itinerant lifestyle with her circus clown father Bill (Patrick Huard) and his stagehand Mandeep (Robin Aubert), but longs for a more conventional and stable life; she is given an opportunity to chase her own dreams when her teacher Patricia (Sophie Lorain) recognizes her academic potential and helps her to secure admission to a private boarding school, challenging her relationship with her father.

The film was inspired in part by Bouchard's own experience as the daughter of a circus performer, although she has clarified that it should not be interpreted autobiographically.

The film premiered in theatres on August 14, 2020.

== Awards ==
Award	Date of ceremony	Category	Recipient(s)	Result	Ref(s)
Prix Iris	June 6, 2021	Revelation of the Year	Jasmine Lemée	Nominated	
Prix Iris	June 6, 2021	Best Art Direction	David Pelletier	Nominated	
Prix Iris	June 6, 2021	Best Costume Design	Sharon Scott	Nominated	
Prix Iris	June 6, 2021	Best Hair	Stéphanie DeFlandre	Nominated	
