= Solo (2023 film) =

2023 Canadian drama film

- Film poster
- Directed by: Sophie Dupuis
- Written by: Sophie Dupuis
- Produced by: Étienne Hansez
- Starring: Théodore Pellerin; Félix Maritaud; Anne-Marie Cadieux
- Cinematography: Mathieu Laverdière
- Edited by: Marie-Pier Dupuis; Dominique Fortin; Maxim Rheault
- Music by: Charles Lavoie
- Production company: Bravo Charlie
- Distributed by: Music Box Films
- Release date: September 10, 2023 (TIFF)
- Running time: 102 minutes
- Country: Canada
- Language: French
- Box office: $13,369

Solo is a 2023 Canadian romantic drama film, written and directed by Sophie Dupuis. The film stars Théodore Pellerin as Simon, a young emerging drag queen in Montreal who is drawn into a passionate but complicated romance with Olivier (Félix Maritaud), while simultaneously navigating a reunion with his estranged mother Claire (Anne-Marie Cadieux), whom he has not seen since she left Canada 15 years earlier to pursue her career as an opera singer.

The film's cast also includes Jean Marchand, Vlad Alexis, Tommy Joubert, Alice Moreault and Marc-André Leclair. Its soundtrack includes music by ABBA, Chaka Khan, Marie Davidson, CRi, Donna Summer, Dominique Fils-Aimé, Alma Faye Brooks, Filippin & Runah, Sophie Ellis-Bextor and Mitsou.

== Synopsis ==
Follows Simon, who must deal with the disappointment of two impossible loves: a passionate but destructive crush on Olivier and a distant and cold relationship with his mother Claire, who has just moved back in after a 15-year absence.

== Cast ==
- Théodore Pellerin as Simon / Glory Gold
- Félix Maritaud as Olivier / Dragona
- Alice Moreault as Maude
- Anne-Marie Cadieux as Claire
- Vlad Alexis as Édouard / Félina Kyle
- Tommy Joubert as Guillaume / Denise
- Jean Marchand as Fred / Frida
- Marc-André Leclair as Nicolas / Becky Bobo
- Roger Léger as Roger
- Josée Deschênes as Aline
- François Dagenais as Charles

== Production ==
The film entered production in 2022, under the working title Drag. Dupuis has acknowledged the risk that the film may be controversial in the contemporary political climate around the legitimacy of drag, but has described the film as a "gesture of activism" in defense of the art form.

Dupuis has described her directorial process as one in which she does not present a finished script at the outset, but instead works extensively with her actors to "rehearse a lot and bring new ideas, propose, deconstruct something, maybe brainstorm with me, and we rewrite" before arriving at the final script.

Pellerin noted in an interview on the CBC Gem talk show Here & Queer that after production concluded on Family First (Chien de garde), Dupuis asked him if there were any particular roles he would be interested in playing in the future, and he said a drag queen.

== Distribution ==
The film premiered at the 2023 Toronto International Film Festival, and screened as the opening film of the 2023 Quebec City Film Festival, before going into commercial release in September 2023. It was acquired for U.S. distribution by Music Box Films and will be released in limited theaters in May 2024.

== Critical response ==
On the review aggregator website Rotten Tomatoes, 94% of 35 critics' reviews are positive, with an average rating of 8.1/10. Metacritic, which uses a weighted average, assigned the film a score of 75 out of 100, based on 8 critics, indicating "generally favorable" reviews.

Allan Hunter of Screen Daily described the film as containing elements of All About Eve, Opening Night and Passages, writing that "Dupuis is well served by her actors. The female characters generally have less impact but Alice Moreault makes the most of the loyal Maude as she is forced into the role of helpless bystander to her brother’s growing unhappiness. Felix Maritaud lends Olivier a light, seductive charm that can always be switched on if it is to his advantage. He also brings the weary air of someone who only wants a relationship on his terms and will suffer neither challenge nor tantrum. Recently seen as Beau’s son in Beau Is Afraid (2023), the prolific Pellerin is perfectly cast as Simon. All windmill arms and wounded heart, his surface confidence as Glory Gore is distinct from the vulnerabilities he reveals as someone unable to believe that he is entirely worthy of love."

The film was named to TIFF's annual Canada's Top Ten list for 2023.

== Awards ==
| Award | Date of ceremony | Category | Recipient(s) | Result | Ref(s) |
|---|---|---|---|---|---|
| Toronto International Film Festival | September 2023 | Best Canadian Film | Sophie Dupuis | Won | |
| Toronto Film Critics Association | 2023 | Rogers Best Canadian Film Award | Sophie Dupuis | Nominated | |
| Toronto Film Critics Association | 2023 | Outstanding Performance in a Canadian Film | Théodore Pellerin | Nominated | |
| Vancouver Film Critics Circle | 2023 | Best Actor in a Canadian Film | Théodore Pellerin | Nominated | |
| Canadian Screen Awards | May 2024 | Best Picture | Étienne Hansez | Nominated | |
| Canadian Screen Awards | May 2024 | Best Director | Sophie Dupuis | Nominated | |
| Canadian Screen Awards | May 2024 | Best Lead Performance in a Drama Film | Théodore Pellerin | Nominated | |
| Canadian Screen Awards | May 2024 | Best Cinematography | Mathieu Laverdière | Nominated | |
| Prix Iris | December 8, 2024 | Best Film | Étienne Hansez | Nominated | |
| Prix Iris | December 8, 2024 | Best Director | Sophie Dupuis | Nominated | |
| Prix Iris | December 8, 2024 | Best Actor | Théodore Pellerin | Won | |
| Prix Iris | December 8, 2024 | Best Costume Design | Cédric Quenneville | Won | |
| Prix Iris | December 8, 2024 | Best Cinematography | Mathieu Laverdière | Nominated | |
| Prix Iris | December 8, 2024 | Best Editing | Marie-Pier Dupuis, Dominique Fortin, Maxim Rheault | Nominated | |
| Prix Iris | December 8, 2024 | Best Original Music | Charles Lavoie | Nominated | |
| Prix Iris | December 8, 2024 | Best Sound | Patrice LeBlanc, Luc Boudrias, Jean Camden | Nominated | |
| Prix Iris | December 8, 2024 | Best Hair | Nermin Grbic | Nominated | |
| Prix Iris | December 8, 2024 | Best Makeup | Marie Salvado | Won | |
