= Slut in a Good Way =

- French: Charlotte a du fun
- Directed by: Sophie Lorain
- Written by: Catherine Léger
- Produced by: Martin Paul-Hus
- Starring: Marguerite Bouchard; Romane Denis; Rose Adam; Anthony Therrien
- Cinematography: Alexis Durand-Brault
- Edited by: Louis-Philippe Rathé
- Music by: Dazmo; Sari Dijani; Pierre-Luc Rioux; Marc-André Sauvageau; Rudy Toussaint
- Production company: Amérique Film
- Distributed by: Christal Films
- Release date: March 2, 2018 (Canada)
- Running time: 89 minutes
- Country: Canada
- Language: French
- Box office: $40,513

Slut in a Good Way (French: Charlotte a du fun) is a Canadian black-and-white comedy film from Quebec written by Catherine Léger and directed by Sophie Lorain. It stars Marguerite Bouchard, Romane Denise, and Rose Adam as three teenage girls navigating their sexuality and rebelling against sexual double standards. The film premiered in Canada in March 2018 and subsequently screened at the Tribeca Festival.

The film earned a positive reception from critics who applauded its sex-positive message and its novel approach to the coming-of-age and romantic comedy genres. Léger won a Canadian Screen Award for her script.

== Synopsis ==
17-year-old Charlotte is reeling from a breakup with her boyfriend, who confessed to her he is gay right after she lost her virginity to him. One day, Charlotte and her friends Mégane and Aube wander into the big-box toy store Jouets Dépôt, and after discovering that several attractive men work there, the girls apply for part-time jobs. On her first day at work, Charlotte is paired with the amiable Guillaume. On another day, she is tasked with shadowing the flirtatious Francis. To get over her ex, Charlotte reciprocates Francis's advances and sleeps with him. She subsequently engages in dalliances with other male co-workers, with the exception of Guillaume.

Unbeknownst to Charlotte, the men share their stories about having sex with her, which gives her a reputation as a "slut." At a Halloween party, Charlotte and Guillaume grow closer, but just as they are about to kiss, Francis walks in on them and makes a casual comment to Charlotte congratulating her on reaching "a perfect score", meaning she has had sex with nearly all of the male workers at the store. A humiliated Charlotte suspects Guillaume of trying to sleep with her just so he can join the other employees. Guillaume insists this was not his intention and that he truly likes her, but Charlotte leaves and gives him the cold shoulder at work.

Charlotte responds to the sexism by resolving to stay abstinent. When the men participate in Movember, an annual fundraiser to raise awareness for men's health issues such as prostate cancer, Mégane mocks them and says the only ones who stand to benefit from their fundraiser are the pharmaceutical companies that would profit from finding a cure for prostate cancer. She creates her own movement in response—a Lysistrata-like campaign to withhold sex from the men at work until Christmas. The other girls at the store, also put off by the double standards concerning male and female sexuality, join Charlotte and Mégane in the pledge and help raise funds for women's cancer research.

Aube, the only virgin of the trio, is attracted to co-worker Olivier, but he is oblivious to her interest. In an attempt to show solidarity with the other men who want to end the girls' "sex strike", Olivier approaches Aube and accompanies her home one day. While watching a movie together, the two indulge in foreplay. When Charlotte learns Aube kissed Olivier, she accuses Aube of wanting to break the strike. In an argument in front of all of the other girls, Aube slut-shames Charlotte. The girls decide to call off the whole sex strike. Shortly before Christmas, Charlotte goes to visit Léa, a single mother and Jouets Dépôt manager who has recently given birth. Léa assures Charlotte that she should not be ashamed about her sexuality and not allow petty gossip to depress her. Charlotte gives the money raised from the abstinence pledge ($2,000 in total) to Léa and her new baby.

Charlotte reconciles with Aube and Mégane, with Aube apologizing for calling Charlotte a “slut in a bad way” and Mégane apologizing to Aube for calling her a "virgin in a bad way.” The trio heads to a Christmas party where Mégane makes a serious announcement that stops everyone in their tracks—Charlotte is pregnant and does not know who the father is. After saying she will keep the baby, Charlotte reveals she is just joking about a pregnancy. Many of the employees have become involved with other employees — Aube with Olivier, Antoine with Émilie, and Francis with Mégane. Charlotte apologizes to Guillaume, who accepts her apology and says he is glad they can still be friends. Charlotte insists she wants to be more than friends, and after jokingly flirting with her, Guillaume kisses her. The film ends in a Bollywood-style holiday dance sequence.

== Cast ==
- Marguerite Bouchard as Charlotte
- Romane Denis as Mégane
- Rose Adam as Aube
- Alex Godbout as Guillaume
- Marylou Belugou as Léa
- Vassili Schneider as Olivier
- Claudia Bouvette as Noémie
- Audrey Roger as Émilie
- Anthony Therrien as Francis
- Nicolas Fontaine as Antoine

== Production ==
Because of the film's subject matter concerning young women and sexuality, no Toys "R" Us stores allowed filming at their locations. Production built a set in an empty lot for the Jouets Dépôt store.

Lorain chose to shoot the film in black-and-white not only to give the film a "timeless" look, but to ensure that the lead characters would not be drowned out by the colorful setting of the toy store.

== Release ==
The film had its world premiere in Canada on March 2, 2018. In the United States, the film premiered on April 21, 2018, at the Tribeca Festival. Comedy Dynamics picked up the film for theatrical distribution and it received a limited release on March 29, 2019.

== Reception ==
On review aggregator website Rotten Tomatoes, Slut in a Good Way has an approval rating of 100% based on 21 reviews. On Metacritic, the film has a score of 74 based on 9 reviews, indicating a "generally favorable" reception.

Critics praised the film for its unapologetic look at female adolescent sexuality. Peter Debruge of Variety called it a "hilarious twist on the traditionally male-driven teen sex comedy, wherein immature young men spend considerable effort trying to convince someone to sleep with them", and wrote "this tiny Canadian crowd-pleaser argues there's nothing wrong if girls just want to have fun too." Writing in The New York Times, Teo Bugbee said, "In satisfying fashion, Slut in a Good Way recognizes the potential for cruelty that exists as teenagers experiment and learn through sex, but its portrait of adolescence never feels less than loving." Leah Greenblatt of Entertainment Weekly gave the film a grade of B+, writing "even if Lorain’s tidy ending is more than a little idealized, Slut is far more gratifying and empowering than most of the material Hollywood’s Lolita Industrial Complex turns out when it comes to young women’s sexuality. Whatever the title says, it’s not about good or bad; it’s about every girl’s right to choose her own labels, or none at all. Monica Castillo of RogerEbert.com wrote, "The film’s sharp critique of double standards never feels like sermonizing, the teenagers’ observations about their situations feel organic, like stray musings traded over smuggled booze in the park." Castillo said the black-and-white cinematography gives the film a "modern yet romantic" feel, and also praised the lead actors, writing "Bouchard, Adam and Denis’s naturalistic performances bring these lively characters off the page in a way that’s effortlessly charming."

== Accolades ==
Award	Date of ceremony	Category	Recipient(s)	Result	Ref(s)
Canadian Screen Awards	31 March 2019	Best Supporting Actress	Romane Denis	Nominated	
Canadian Screen Awards	31 March 2019	Best Original Screenplay	Catherine Léger	Won	
Canadian Screen Awards	31 March 2019	Achievement in Hair	Johanne Paiement	Nominated	
Golden Trailer Awards	2019	Most Original Foreign Trailer	Nacelle, Project X/AV	Nominated	
Prix Iris	3 June 2018	Best Supporting Actor	Anthony Therrien	Nominated	
Prix Iris	3 June 2018	Revelation of the Year	Romane Denis	Nominated	
Prix Iris	3 June 2018	Best Casting	Lucie Robitaille	Nominated	
