= Wild Skin =

- French: La Peau sauvage
- Directed by: Ariane Louis-Seize
- Written by: Ariane Louis-Seize
- Produced by: Hany Ouichou; Jeanne-Marie Poulain
- Starring: Marilyn Castonguay; Alexis Lefebvre
- Cinematography: Shawn Pavlin
- Edited by: Sophie Farkas Bolla
- Music by: Peter Venne
- Production companies: Art & Essai
- Release date: September 13, 2016 (TIFF)
- Running time: 19 minutes
- Country: Canada

Wild Skin (French: La Peau sauvage) is a 2016 Canadian short drama film, written and directed by Ariane Louis-Seize. Without dialogue, the film stars Marilyn Castonguay as a woman who has a strange erotic experience after unexpectedly finding a python in her apartment.

The film premiered at the 2016 Toronto International Film Festival.

The film was a shortlisted Prix Iris nominee for Best Short Film at the 19th Quebec Cinema Awards. At the 5th Canadian Screen Awards, the film was nominated for Best Live Action Short Drama.
