= Young Juliette =

2019 Canadian comedy-drama film

- Film poster
- French: Jeune Juliette
- Directed by: Anne Émond
- Written by: Anne Émond
- Produced by: Sylvain Corbeil
- Starring: Alexane Jamieson; Léanne Désilets; Myriam Leblanc; Robin Aubert; Antoine DesRochers
- Cinematography: Olivier Gossot
- Edited by: Alexandre Leblanc
- Music by: Vincent Roberge
- Production company: Metafilms
- Distributed by: Maison 4:3
- Release dates: August 7, 2019 (Théâtre Outremont); August 9, 2019 (Quebec)
- Running time: 97 minutes
- Country: Canada
- Language: French
- Budget: C$2.8 million

Young Juliette (French: Jeune Juliette) is a 2019 Canadian comedy-drama film written and directed by Anne Émond. A semi-autobiographical coming-of-age film, it stars Alexane Jamieson in the title role. The film premiered in Quebec in August 2019, received Canadian Screen Award and Prix Iris nominations, and won awards at comedy film festivals in Liège and Muret.

== Synopsis ==
Juliette is a 14-year-old full-figured high school student who is bullied, but does not see herself as a victim and often answers back with humour. In the final weeks before summer vacation, she navigates school, family life, a crush on Liam, her older brother’s best friend, and her time babysitting Arnaud, a younger boy on the spectrum.

== Cast ==
The cast includes:

- Alexane Jamieson as Juliette
- Léanne Désilets as Léane
- Robin Aubert as Bernard, Juliette's father
- Gabriel Beaudet as Arnaud
- Antoine Desrochers as Liam
- Christophe Levac as Pierre-Luc, Juliette's brother
- Stéphane Crête as Mr. Bernier, a teacher
- Tatiana Zinga Botao as Malaika, Bernard's girlfriend
- Karl Farah as Serge, the gym teacher
- Myriam Leblanc as Maude
- Nicolas Fontaine as the bully

== Production ==
The film was written and directed by Anne Émond as her fourth feature film. Émond described it as semi-autobiographical and inspired by her adolescence, but said she chose to make the story as a comedy rather than a drama. It was produced by Metafilms. Filming took place in Montreal and the surrounding area from August 16 to September 27, 2018. The film had an approximate budget of C$2.8 million.

== Release ==
The film premiered at Théâtre Outremont on August 7, 2019, before opening theatrically on 23 screens in Quebec on August 9, 2019. It was later released in France on December 11, 2019 on around 50 screens through distributor Ligne 7.

== Reception ==
=== Critical response ===
Writing for the Montreal Gazette, T’Cha Dunlevy called the film a "rousing comedy" and wrote that Alexane Jamieson "is a revelation" in the lead role. He also described the film as a "colourful, kooky and cool" coming-of-age comedy.

=== Awards and nominations ===
Award	Date of ceremony	Category	Recipient(s)	Result	Ref(s).
Festival International du Film de Comédie de Liège	2019	Acting Award	Alexane Jamieson	Won	
Festival International du Film de Comédie de Liège	2019	Jury Prize	Young Juliette	Won	
Festival du film de Muret	2019	Acting Award	Alexane Jamieson	Won	
Canadian Screen Awards	May 28, 2020	Best Original Screenplay	Anne Émond	Nominated	
Prix Iris	June 10, 2020	Best Film	Sylvain Corbeil	Nominated	
Prix Iris	June 10, 2020	Best Actor	Robin Aubert	Nominated	
Prix Iris	June 10, 2020	Best Screenplay	Anne Émond	Nominated	
Prix Iris	June 10, 2020	Best Art Direction	Sylvain Lemaitre	Nominated	
Prix Iris	June 10, 2020	Revelation of the Year	Alexane Jamieson	Nominated	
Prix Iris	June 10, 2020	Best Casting	Nathalie Boutrie	Nominated	
