= The Depths (2019 film) =

2019 Canadian short drama film

- French: Les profondeurs
- Directed by: Ariane Louis-Seize
- Written by: Ariane Louis-Seize
- Produced by: Jeanne-Marie Poulain
- Starring: Geneviève Boivin-Roussy
- Cinematography: Shawn Pavlin
- Edited by: Myriam Magassouba
- Music by: Pierre-Philippe Côté
- Distributed by: Travelling Distribution
- Release date: September 6, 2019 (TIFF)
- Running time: 21 minutes
- Country: Canada
- Language: French

The Depths (French: Les profondeurs) is a 2019 Canadian short drama film, written and directed by Ariane Louis-Seize. The film stars Geneviève Boivin-Roussy as Justine, a young woman grieving her mother's recent death at the mother's lakefront cabin, who decides to go diving in the lake after finding a scuba suit among her mother's possessions.

The film premiered at the 2019 Toronto International Film Festival. It was subsequently screened at the Cinéfest Sudbury International Film Festival, where it won the Audience Choice Award for Best Short Film.
