= The Fall of Sparta =

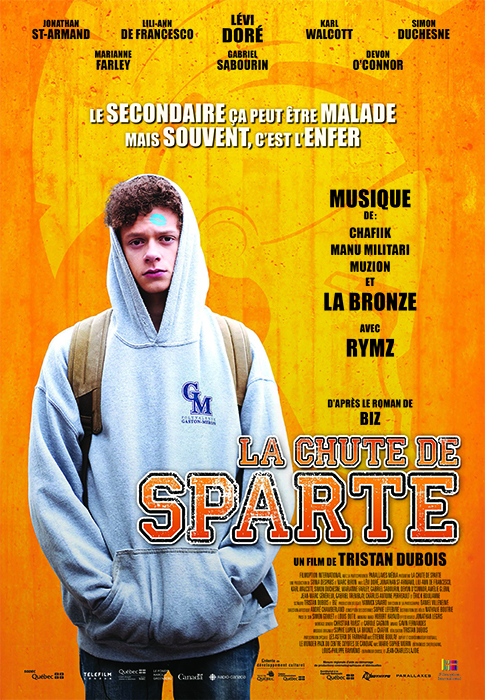
- Film poster
- La chute de Sparte
- Directed by: Tristan Dubois
- Written by: Tristan Dubois; Sébastien "Biz" Fréchette
- Based on: La chute de Sparte by Sébastien "Biz" Fréchette
- Produced by: Marc Biron; Sonia Despars
- Starring: Lévi Doré; Jonathan St-Arnaud; Eric K. Boulianne
- Cinematography: Daniel Villeneuve
- Edited by: Hubert Hayaud
- Music by: Sophie Lupien
- Production company: Parallaxes
- Release dates: March 2018 (Cannes); 1 June 2018
- Running time: 93 minutes
- Country: Canada
- Language: French

The Fall of Sparta (French: La chute de Sparte) is a Canadian drama film, directed by Tristan Dubois and released in 2018. Adapted from the young adult novel by Sébastien "Biz" Fréchette, the film stars Lévi Doré as Steeve Simard, a bookish and introverted teenager in Saint-Lambert, Quebec in his final year of high school.

Dubois and Biz opted to cast the film in a color-blind way, choosing the best actor for each role regardless of whether they corresponded to their character's stated or presumed racial background in the original novel.

== Awards ==
Fanny Vachon received a Canadian Screen Award nomination for Best Makeup at the 7th Canadian Screen Awards. The film received three Prix Iris nominations at the 21st Quebec Cinema Awards, for Best Hairstyling (André Duval), Revelation of the Year (Doré) and Best Casting (Nathalie Boutrie).
