= Shawn Pavlin =

Canadian cinematographer

Shawn Pavlin is a Canadian cinematographer from Quebec. He is most noted for his work on the film Humanist Vampire Seeking Consenting Suicidal Person (Vampire humaniste cherche suicidaire consentant), for which he received a Prix Iris nomination for Best Cinematography at the 26th Quebec Cinema Awards in 2024.

His prior credits have included the films Wild Skin (La Peau sauvage), Little Waves (Les Petites vagues), The Depths (Les Profondeurs), Shooting Star (Comme une comète) and The Noise of Engines (Le Bruit des moteurs).
