= Tania Arana =

French-Canadian casting director

Tania Arana is a casting director, who works in both France and Canada. She is most noted for her work on the film Humanist Vampire Seeking Consenting Suicidal Person (Vampire humaniste cherche suicidaire consentant), for which she received a Canadian Screen Award nomination for Best Casting in a Film at the 12th Canadian Screen Awards, and won the Prix Iris for Best Casting at the 26th Quebec Cinema Awards.

Her other credits have included the films Maman(s), Just Me and You (Juste moi et toi), Cuties (Mignonnes), Our Father, the Devil (Mon père, le diable), Rodeo (Rodéo) and Lucy Grizzli Sophie.

She is the president of her own firm, Tania Arana Casting, with offices in both Paris and Montreal.

She was also the co-director with Quentin Fabiani of the 2015 short film Voices (Je suis une voix).
