= Viking (2022 film) =

- Film poster
- Directed by: Stéphane Lafleur
- Written by: Stéphane Lafleur; Eric K. Boulianne
- Produced by: Kim McCraw; Luc Déry
- Starring: Steve Laplante; Larissa Corriveau; Fabiola N. Aladin; Hamza Haq
- Cinematography: Sara Mishara
- Edited by: Sophie Leblond
- Music by: Mathieu Charbonneau; Christophe Lamarche-Ledoux
- Production company: micro_scope
- Distributed by: Films Opale
- Release date: September 12, 2022 (TIFF)
- Running time: 104 minutes
- Country: Canada
- Language: French

Viking is a 2022 Canadian comedy film, directed by Stéphane Lafleur. The film centres on a group of people who are working as a "B team" to reenact the events of the first crewed mission to Mars, in the hopes of trying to solve the interpersonal problems among the astronauts that have impacted the real mission.

The film's cast includes Steve Laplante, Larissa Corriveau, Fabiola Nyrva Aladin, Hamza Haq, Denis Houle, Marie Brassard and Martin-David Peters.

The film premiered in the Platform Prize program at the 2022 Toronto International Film Festival on September 12, 2022.

In 2023, the film was released in France under the alternate title On dirait la planète mars.

== Cast ==
- Marie Brassard as Christiane Comte
- Steve Laplante as David
- Fabiola Nyrva Aladin as Janet
- Denis Houle as Liz
- Larissa Corriveau as Steven
- Hamza Haq as Gary
- Christopher Heyerdahl as Roy Walker

== Critical response ==
Pat Mullen of That Shelf called Viking "Lafleur's best film yet", and analyzed it in part as an allegory for the technological mediations that society has had to cope with through the COVID-19 pandemic.

The film was named to TIFF's annual year-end Canada's Top Ten list for 2022.

== Awards ==
Award	Date of ceremony	Category	Recipient(s)	Result	Ref.
Toronto International Film Festival	2022	Best Canadian Film	Viking	Honoured	
Utopiales	2022	Grand Prix du Jury	Viking	Won	
Cinéfest Sudbury International Film Festival	2022	Best French-Language Feature	Viking	Won	
Vevey International Funny Film Festival	2022	VIFFF d’or	Viking	Won	
Prix collégial du cinéma québécois	2023	Best Film	Viking	Won	
Canadian Screen Awards	April 16, 2023	Best Motion Picture	Luc Déry, Kim McCraw	Nominated	
Canadian Screen Awards	April 16, 2023	Best Director	Stéphane Lafleur	Nominated	
Canadian Screen Awards	April 16, 2023	Best Lead Performance in a Film	Steve Laplante	Nominated	
Canadian Screen Awards	April 16, 2023	Best Original Screenplay	Stéphane Lafleur, Eric K. Boulianne	Nominated	
Canadian Screen Awards	April 16, 2023	Best Art Direction/Production Design	André-Line Beauparlant	Nominated	
Canadian Screen Awards	April 16, 2023	Best Cinematography	Sara Mishara	Won	
Canadian Screen Awards	April 16, 2023	Best Costume Design	Sophie Lefebvre	Nominated	
Canadian Screen Awards	April 16, 2023	Best Editing	Sophie Leblond	Nominated	
Canadian Screen Awards	April 16, 2023	Best Sound Editing	Sylvain Bellemare, Simon Meilleur, Frédéric Lavigne, Francis Gauthier, Claire Pochon	Nominated	
Canadian Screen Awards	April 16, 2023	Best Sound Mixing	Pierre Bertrand, Bernard Gariépy Strobl	Nominated	
Canadian Screen Awards	April 16, 2023	Best Makeup	Marie-Josée Galibert	Nominated	
Canadian Screen Awards	April 16, 2023	Best Hair	Vincent Dufault	Nominated	
Canadian Screen Awards	April 16, 2023	Best Casting in a Film	Lucie Robitaille	Nominated	
Prix Iris	December 10, 2023	Best Film	Luc Déry, Kim McCraw	Won	
Prix Iris	December 10, 2023	Best Director	Stéphane Lafleur	Won	
Prix Iris	December 10, 2023	Best Actor	Steve Laplante	Won	
Prix Iris	December 10, 2023	Best Actress	Larissa Corriveau	Nominated	
Prix Iris	December 10, 2023	Best Supporting Actor	Denis Houle	Nominated	
Prix Iris	December 10, 2023	Revelation of the Year	Fabiola Nyrva Aladin	Nominated	
Prix Iris	December 10, 2023	Best Screenplay	Stéphane Lafleur, Eric K. Boulianne	Won	
Prix Iris	December 10, 2023	Best Art Direction	André-Line Beauparlant	Won	
Prix Iris	December 10, 2023	Best Costume Design	Sophie Lefebvre	Won	
Prix Iris	December 10, 2023	Best Cinematography	Sara Mishara	Won	
Prix Iris	December 10, 2023	Best Editing	Sophie Leblond	Won	
Prix Iris	December 10, 2023	Best Original Music	Christophe Lamarche-Ledoux, Mathieu Charbonneau	Nominated	
Prix Iris	December 10, 2023	Best Sound	Sylvain Bellemare, Bernard Gariépy Strobl, Pierre Bertrand	Won	
Prix Iris	December 10, 2023	Best Hairstyling	Vincent Dufault	Nominated	
Prix Iris	December 10, 2023	Best Makeup	Marie-Josée Galibert	Nominated	
Prix Iris	December 10, 2023	Best Casting	Lucie Robitaille, Dandy Thibaudeau	Won	
Prix Iris	December 10, 2023	Best Visual Effects	Marie-Claude Lafontaine, Simon Beaupré	Won	
Prix Iris	December 10, 2023	Most Successful Film Outside Quebec	Luc Déry, Kim McCraw, Stéphane Lafleur, Eric K. Boulianne, Christian Larouche, Sébastien Létourneau	Nominated	
