= Maxim Rheault =

Canadian film editor

Maxim Rheault is a Canadian film editor from Quebec. He is most noted for his work on the film Solo, for which he received a Prix Iris nomination for Best Editing at the 26th Quebec Cinema Awards in 2024.

He has also directed a number of short films, as well as a segment of the dramatic anthology feature film Of Ink and Blood (D'encre et de sang).
