= Dino Tavarone =

Italian-Canadian actor (born 1942)

Dino Tavarone (born December 28, 1942) is an Italian-Canadian actor most prominent in the Cinema of Quebec. He is most noted for his role as mafia boss Giuseppe Scarfo in the television series Omertà, and his performance in Manon Briand's film 2 Seconds (2 secondes), for which he received a Jutra Award nomination for Best Actor at the 1st Jutra Awards in 1999.

Before undertaking his career in acting, Tavarone spent four years in prison for drug trafficking, and subsequently opened his own restaurant in Montreal.

== Filmography ==
=== Film ===
- Zie 37 Stagen (1997)
- 2 Seconds (2 secondes): Lorenzo (1998)
- La Position de l'escargot: Marcos (1999)
- The Uncles: Lino Rossi (2000)
- Café Olé: Sal (2000)
- Mambo Italiano: Giorgio (2003)
- The American Trap (Le piège américain): Carlos Marcello (2008)
- Hot Dog: Parrain Massino (2013)
- Corbo: Achille Corbo (2014)
- Antoine et Marie: Vito Pipingo (2014)
- My Friend Dino (Mon ami Dino): Dino (2016)
- The Honorable Society: Luciano (2018)
- Hotel Limbo: Frank Zamboni (2020)
- Miss Boots (Mlle Bottine): Georges (2024)

=== Television ===
- Omertà: Giuseppe Scarfo (1996)
- Paparazzi: Mgr. Carabelli (1997)
- The Best Bad Thing: Mr. Sabatini (1997)
- 36 Hours to Die (Chantage sans issue): Angeli (1999)
- L'Or: Robert Martinelli (2001)
- Il Duce canadese: Turi (2004)
- Minuit, le soir: Paolo Campagnolo (2005)
