= Michel Dumont =

Canadian actor (1941–2020)

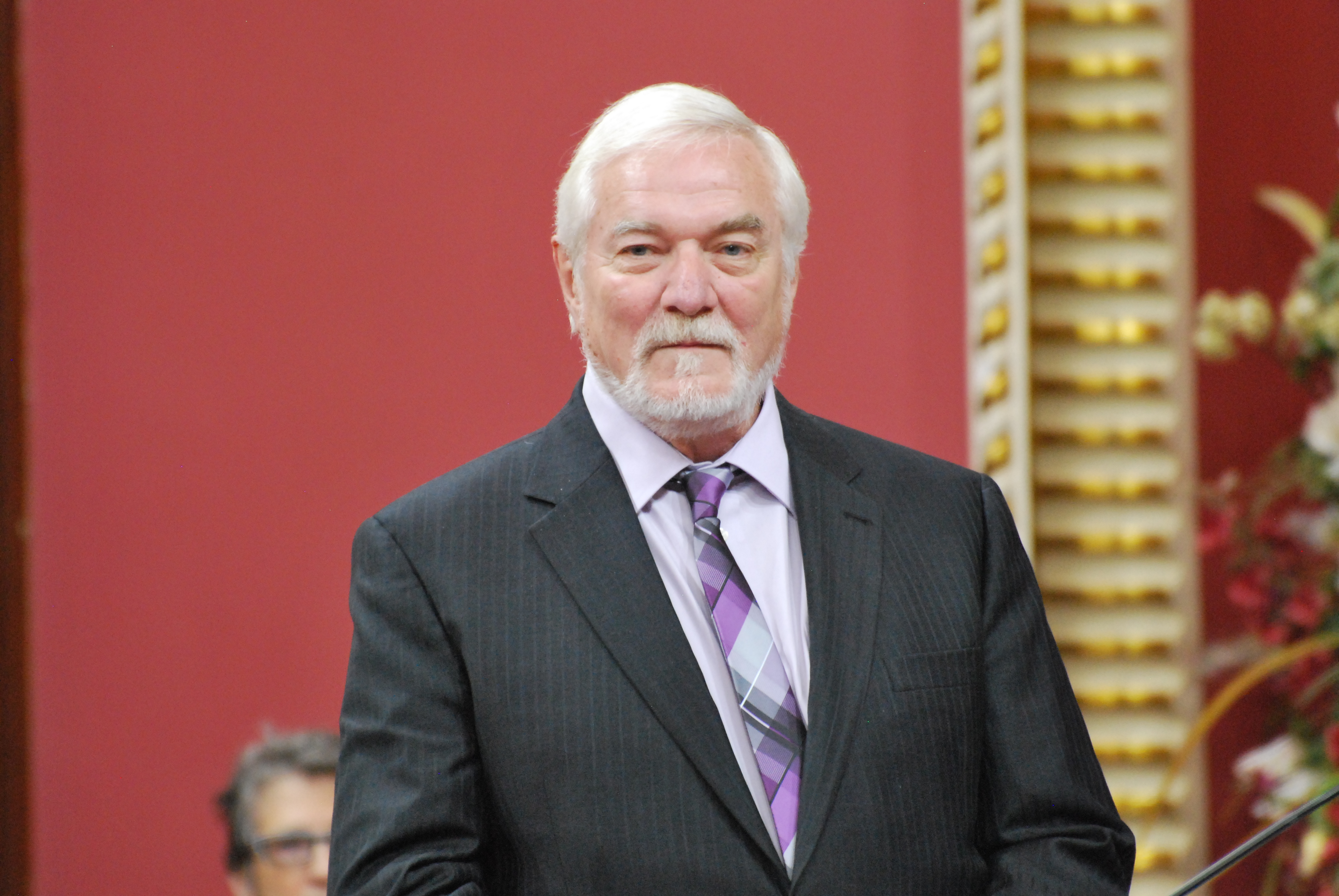
- Dumont in 2013
- Born: 29 January 1941; Saguenay, Quebec, Canada
- Died: 13 August 2020 (aged 79)
- Occupation(s): Actor, artistic director

Michel Dumont OQ (29 January 1941 – 13 August 2020) was a Canadian actor. He served as the artistic director for the Théâtre Jean-Duceppe in Montreal from 1991 to 2018.

== Filmography ==
- Picotine (1972-1975)
- Du tac au tac (1976)
- Race de monde (1978-1981)
- Chocolate Eclair (1979)
- Frédéric (1980)
- Monsieur le ministre (1982-1986)
- Laurier (1984)
- Des dames de cœur (1986-1989)
- Cargo (1990)
- Marilyn (1991)
- Les Grands Procès (1994)
- Urgence (1996)
- Omerta (1996)
- Omerta 2: The Law of Silence (1997)
- La Part des anges (1998)
- Rue l'Espérance (1999)
- Laura Cadieux II (1999)
- L'Or (2001)
- Bunker, le cirque (2002)
- 24 poses (2002)
- Without Her (2005)
- Northern Mysteries (2006)
- Un homme mort (2006)
- L'amour aller-retour (2009)
- Yamasaka (2009)
- Café de Flore (2011)
- Omertà (2012)
- Le Garagiste (2015)
- Victor Lessard (2017)

== Distinctions ==
- Prix Gémeaux for Best Male Lead, Omerta 2: The Law of Silence (1998)
- Prix Gémeaux for Best Male Lead, Bunker, le cirque (2003)
- Officer of the National Order of Quebec (2013)
