= Jeanne-Marie Poulain =

Canadian film producer

Jeanne-Marie Poulain is a Canadian film producer, associated with the Montreal-based film studio Art & Essai. They are most noted as a producer of Humanist Vampire Seeking Consenting Suicidal Person (Vampire humaniste cherche suicidaire consentant), which was a Canadian Screen Award nominee for Best Picture at the 12th Canadian Screen Awards in 2024.

They were previously a producer of Wild Skin (La Peau sauvage), which was both a Canadian Screen Award nominee for Best Live Action Short Drama at the 5th Canadian Screen Awards, and a Prix Iris nominee for Best Live Action Short Film at the 19th Quebec Cinema Awards.

Their other credits have included the films A Skin So Soft (Ta peau si lisse), Of Ink and Blood (D'Encre et de sang), Little Waves (Les petites vagues) and The Depths (Les Profondeurs), and associate or executive producer credits on I'll End Up in Jail (Je finirai en prison), Like a House on Fire, Richelieu, Cardboard City (Ville Jacques-Carton) and Toy Gun Bandit (Faux gun bandit).
