= André Duval =

André Duval is a Canadian hairstylist who works in film and television. He is most noted for his work on the 2009 film The Master Key (Grande Ourse: La Clé des possibles), for which he and Djina Caron won the Genie Award for Best Makeup at the 30th Genie Awards. Duval was also a Jutra Award nominee for Best Hair at the 12th Jutra Awards.

== Awards ==
Award	Year	Category	Work	Result	Ref(s)
Genie Awards	2010	Best Makeup	The Master Key (Grande Ourse: La Clé des possibles)	Won	
Canadian Screen Awards	2013	Best Makeup	L'Affaire Dumont	Nominated	
Canadian Screen Awards	2019	Best Hair	The Hummingbird Project	Nominated	
Canadian Screen Awards	2022	Best Hair	The Vinland Club (Le Club Vinland)	Nominated	
Jutra Awards	2010	Best Hair	The Master Key (Grande Ourse, la clé des possibles)	Nominated	
Jutra Awards	2011	Best Hair	The Hair of the Beast (Le Poil de la bête)	Nominated	
Jutra Awards	2013	Best Hair	L'Affaire Dumont	Nominated	
Prix Iris	2019	Best Hair	The Fall of Sparta (La chute de Sparte)	Nominated	
Prix Iris	2021	Best Hair	The Vinland Club	Nominated	
