= Marie-Ginette Guay =

Canadian actress

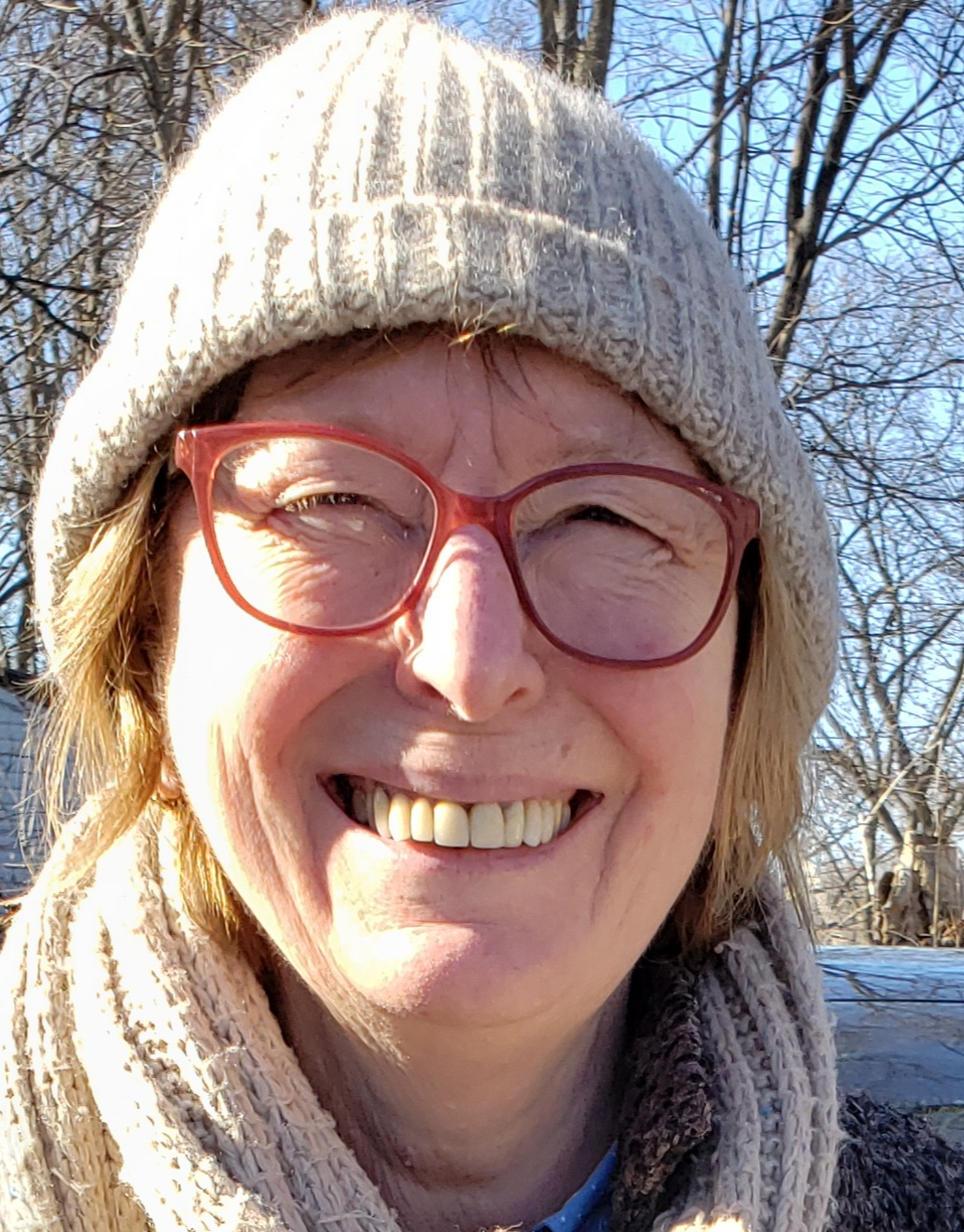
- Guay photographed in Montréal, Canada outside the Pauline-Julien Theatre
- Born: Quebec, Canada
- Occupation: Actor
- Years active: 1979–present
- Known for: Performing as Lucette Simoneau in the film Continental, a Film Without Guns
- Notable work: Continental, a Film Without Guns

Marie-Ginette Guay is a Canadian film and television actress from Quebec. She is most noted for her performance as Lucette Simoneau in the film Continental, a Film Without Guns (Continental, un film sans fusil), for which she was a Genie Award nominee for Best Supporting Actress at the 28th Genie Awards in 2008.

== Filmography ==
=== Film ===
Year	Title	Role	Notes
1979	Le Shift de nuit		
2002	Québec-Montréal	Ghisèle	
2007	Continental, a Film Without Guns (Continental, un film sans fusil)	Lucette Simoneau	
2010	Route 132	Madame Hamel	
2012	On the Road (Sur la route)	Ma Paradise	
2013	Diego Star	Employee	
2013	Triptych	Social worker	
2016	Dead Leaves (Feuilles mortes)	Lucie	
2016	9 (9, le film)	Lady	
2017	Ravenous (Les Affamés)	Thérèse	
2017	Barefoot at Dawn (Pieds nus dans l'aube)	Teacher	
2017	We Are the Others (Nous sommes les autres)	Frederic's mother	
2019	And the Birds Rained Down (Il pleuvait des oiseaux)	Mme Sullivan	
2020	Our Own (Les nôtres)	Mme Tremblay	
2020	The Mother Eagle (Le sang du pelican)	Sr. Angelina	
2021	Ousmane	Édith	
2023	The Nature of Love (Simple comme Sylvain)		

=== Television ===
Year	Title	Role	Notes
2009	Aveux	Micheline Gagnon-Dubreuil	
2009–11	Yamaska	Yvonne Sirois	
2009–12	Chabotte et fille	Simone Guérin	
2010	Mirador	Louise Mallard	
2010	Temps mort	Thérèse	
2011	Toute la vérité	Denise Marchand	
2015	Les jeunes loups	Gertrude Desbiens	
2017	The Siege	Gisèle	
2018–21	Discussions avec mes parents	Rollande Mathieu	
