= Noémie O'Farrell =

Canadian actress

Noémie O'Farrell (born March 16, 1988) is a Canadian actress from Lévis, Quebec. She is most noted for her performances in the 2019 film Fabulous (Fabuleuses), for which she received a Prix Iris nomination for Best Actress at the 22nd Quebec Cinema Awards, and the 2023 film Humanist Vampire Seeking Consenting Suicidal Person (Vampire humaniste cherche suicidaire consentant), for which she received a Canadian Screen Award nomination for Best Supporting Performance in a Comedy Film at the 12th Canadian Screen Awards in 2024.

She has also had roles in the films Dead Leaves (Feuilles mortes), Guilt, Lunar-Orbit Rendezvous and Ababooned (Ababouiné), and the television series L'Heure bleue, En tout cas and Oh My Lord!
