= Sasha Migliarese =

Canadian actress

Sasha Migliarese is a Canadian actress from Quebec. She is most noted for her performance as Meredith in the film My Friend Dino (Mon ami Dino), for which she was a Prix Iris nominee for Revelation of the Year at the 19th Quebec Cinema Awards in 2017.

She has also appeared in the films Rebel (Recrue), Thanks for Everything (Merci pour tout), Mafia Inc., Maria and Bungalow, and the television series Mensonges, Ces gars-là, District 31, Portrait-Robot and Mégantic.
