= Alexane Jamieson =

Canadian actress

Alexane Jamieson is a Canadian actress from Quebec. She is most noted for her performance in the 2019 film Young Juliette (Jeune Juliette), for which she received a Prix Iris nomination for Revelation of the Year at the 22nd Quebec Cinema Awards in 2020.

She previously had supporting roles in the films Cross My Heart (Les Rois mongols) and Threesome (Le Trip à trois). In 2020 she had a recurring role in Ici TOU.TV's short format web series L'effet secondaire.
