= Fabiola Nyrva Aladin =

Canadian film and television actor

- Born: May 2, 1989 (age 36); Repentigny, Quebec, Canada
- Years active: 2017–present

Fabiola Nyrva Aladin is a Canadian actress and comedian from Quebec. She is most noted for her performance in the film Viking, for which she received a Prix Iris nomination for Revelation of the Year at the 25th Quebec Cinema Awards in 2023.
