= Of Ink and Blood =

- French: D'Encre et de sang
- Directed by: Alexis Fortier Gauthier; Maxim Rheault; Francis Fortin
- Written by: Kelly-Anne Bonieux; Ariane Louis-Seize; Rémi Dufresne
- Produced by: Jeanne-Marie Poulain
- Starring: Martin Desgagné; Lysandre Ménard; Iannicko N'Doua-Légaré; Fayolle Jean
- Cinematography: Vincent Biron
- Edited by: Dominique Fortin
- Music by: Peter Venne
- Production company: Les films de l’Atelier
- Distributed by: K-Films Amérique
- Release date: September 20, 2016 (FCVQ)
- Running time: 83 minutes
- Country: Canada
- Language: French

Of Ink and Blood (French: D'Encre et de sang) is a Canadian drama film, released in 2016. It was directed by Alexis Fortier Gauthier, Maxim Rheault and Francis Fortin as a triptych, with each of the film's three segments directed by one of the credited directors.

The film stars Martin Desgagné as Sébastien, a bookstore owner and aspiring writer who has not been successful in getting his work published. One day Joseph (Fayolle Jean), his favourite author, stops by the store, but is killed when he is struck by a car just moments after leaving, giving Sébastien the opportunity to steal Joseph's latest novel manuscript and publish it as his own. Meanwhile, his daughter Sasha (Lysandre Ménard) meets and begins a relationship with Joseph's son Sidney (Iannicko N'Doua-Légaré), attempting to keep him from finding out that she saw the accident, and threatening her father's plan because Sidney knows that his father has completed a new novel.

The cast also includes Jocelyn Blanchard, Véronique Chaumont, Nathalie Coupal, Diane Jules, Didier Lucien and Philippe Vanasse-Paquet in supporting roles.

== Distribution ==
The film premiered at the 2016 Quebec City Film Festival, and was screened at the 2016 Vancouver International Film Festival, before going into commercial release on December 9.
