= Romane Denis =

Canadian actress

- Born: 12 April 1998; Montreal, Canada
- Years active: 2014-

Romane Denis (born April 12, 1998) is a Canadian actress.

She is noted for her performance in the film Slut in a Good Way (Charlotte a du fun), for which she received a Prix Iris nomination for Revelation of the Year at the 20th Quebec Cinema Awards, and a Canadian Screen Award nomination for Best Supporting Actress at the 7th Canadian Screen Awards in 2019.

She voiced Nikki Gold in the video game Marvel's Guardians of the Galaxy.

== Filmography ==
=== Film ===
Year	Title	Role	Notes
2013	Louis Cyr	Marie-Alphonsine Cyr	
2018	Slut in a Good Way	Mégane	
2018	Les Salopes, or the Naturally Wanton Pleasure of Skin	Katou / Marie-Claire's daughter	
2020	My Salinger Year	Girl Who Wants an A	
2020	Slaxx	Libby McClean	
2023	The G	Emma	
2025	Veins	Isabelle	

=== Television ===
Year	Title	Role	Notes
2009-2012	Sam Chicotte	Alice la voisine	
2014–2016	Subito Texto	Mélanie Prud'homme	32 episodes
2015	Over the Garden Wall	Lola	6 episodes
2015	Nouvelle adresse	Megane	22 episodes
2015–2017	Mémoires vives	Roxanne Thibault	6 episodes
2016	Fires	Claudine Grenier	3 episodes
2017	19-2	Tammy	2 episodes
2017	District 31	Alexia Gogas	4 episodes
2017–2021	Les Pays d'en haut	Pâquerette Deschamps	24 episodes
2018–2019	La Derape	Cathie	9 episodes
2019–2020	Nomades	Sam	20 episodes
2020	About Sex	Leah	7 episodes
2020	Le bonheur	Manon	2 episodes
2021	The Wall	Joanie Prévost	9 episodes
2021	Portrait-Robot	Audrey Sandome	2 episodes
2021	Le Monde De Gabrielle Roy	Gabrielle Roy	1 episode
2022	La confrérie	Lily	4 episodes
2022	Motel Paradis	Stéphanie	4 episodes

=== Video games ===
Year	Title	Role	Notes
2021	Marvel's Guardians of the Galaxy	Nikki Gold	
2024	SaGa: Emerald Beyond	Wilma, Kup	
