= Cédric Quenneville =

Canadian costume designer

Cédric Quenneville is a Canadian film and theatre costume designer from Quebec. He is most noted for his work on the film Solo, for which he won the Prix Iris for Best Costume Design at the 26th Quebec Cinema Awards in 2024.

His other credits have included Brigitte Poupart's multimedia theatre presentation Until We Die (Jusqu’à ce qu’on meure), and François Delisle's forthcoming film Waiting for the Storms (Le Temps).
