= Lucie Robitaille =

Lucie Robitaille is a Canadian casting director. The head of her own casting agency, Casting Lucie Robitaille Inc., she has been a three-time Prix Iris nominee for Best Casting, and a Canadian Screen Award nominee for Best Casting in a Film.

== Awards ==
Award	Category	Year	Work	Result	Ref(s)
Canadian Screen Awards	Best Casting in a Film	2023	Viking	Nominated	
Prix Iris	Best Casting	2017	Two Lovers and a Bear	Nominated	
Prix Iris	Best Casting	2018	Slut in a Good Way (Charlotte a du fun)	Nominated	
Prix Iris	Best Casting	2020	And the Birds Rained Down (Il pleuvait des oiseaux)	Nominated	
