= Prix Iris for Revelation of the Year =

Annual Canadian film award

The Prix Iris for Revelation of the Year (French: Prix Iris de la révélation de l'année) is an annual award, presented by Québec Cinéma as part of its Prix Iris program, to honour the best performances by emerging actors in their first major film roles. The award is not separated by gender.

Rykko Bellemare, the first winner of the award, became the second indigenous actor to win an acting award after Natar Ungalaaq won Best Actor for The Necessities of Life (Ce qu'il faut pour vivre). A Colony (Une colonie) became the second film to receive three nominations in an acting category after Les Boys III received three Best Actor nominations.

To date, one actor and seven actresses who were nominated for Revelation of the Year received subsequent nominations in other acting categories:

- Théodore Pellerin, winner of the 2018 award, won Best Supporting Actor for Underground (Souterrain) and Best Actor for Solo, becoming the first person to win all three categories. He was also nominated for Best Actor for Genesis (Genèse).
- Marine Johnson, nominated in 2018, was nominated for Best Supporting Actress for Drunken Birds (Les oiseaux ivres).
- Émilie Bierre, winner of the 2019 award, won Best Actress for Our Own (Les nôtres) and was nominated in the same category for The Guide to the Perfect Family (Le guide de la famille parfaite).
- Nahéma Ricci, winner of the 2020 award, was nominated for Best Actress for Hunting Daze (Jour de chasse).
- Catherine Chabot, nominated in 2020, was nominated for Best Supporting Actress for Compulsive Liar 2 (Menteuse).
- Kelly Depeault, winner of the 2021 award, won Best Actress for Noemie Says Yes (Noémie dit oui).
- Sara Montpetit, winner of the 2022 award, was nominated for Best Actress for Falcon Lake and Humanist Vampire Seeking Consenting Suicidal Person (Vampire humaniste cherche suicidaire consentant).
- Juliette Gariépy, winner of the 2023 award, was nominated for Best Supporting Actress for Two Women (Deux femmes en or).

In 2024, Félix-Antoine Bénard and Ariane Castellanos received dual nominations for Revelation of the Year and Best Actor and Best Actress respectively, marking the first time that actors received multiple nominations in the same year for the same performance. Ariane Castellanos ended up winning both awards.

In 2025, Marguerite Laurence received dual nominations for Revelation of the Year and Best Actress for her performance in Miss Boots (Mlle Bottine).

== 2010s ==
Year	Performer	Film	Ref
2017; 19th Quebec Cinema Awards
2017; 19th Quebec Cinema Awards	Rykko Bellemare	Before the Streets (Avant les rues)	
2017; 19th Quebec Cinema Awards	Étienne Galloy	Prank	
2017; 19th Quebec Cinema Awards	Whitney Lafleur	Split (Écartée)	
2017; 19th Quebec Cinema Awards	Sasha Migliarese	My Friend Dino (Mon ami Dino)	
2017; 19th Quebec Cinema Awards	Kakki Peter	Two Lovers and a Bear	
2018; 20th Quebec Cinema Awards
2018; 20th Quebec Cinema Awards	Théodore Pellerin	Family First (Chien de garde)	
2018; 20th Quebec Cinema Awards	Romane Denis	Slut in a Good Way (Charlotte a du fun)	
2018; 20th Quebec Cinema Awards	Marine Johnson	The Little Girl Who Was Too Fond of Matches (La petite fille qui aimait trop les allumettes)	
2018; 20th Quebec Cinema Awards	Rose-Marie Perreault	Fake Tattoos (Les faux tatouages)	
2018; 20th Quebec Cinema Awards	Nabil Rajo	Boost	
2019; 21st Quebec Cinema Awards
2019; 21st Quebec Cinema Awards	Émilie Bierre	A Colony (Une colonie)	
2019; 21st Quebec Cinema Awards	Irlande Côté	A Colony (Une colonie)	
2019; 21st Quebec Cinema Awards	Lévi Doré	The Fall of Sparta (La chute de Sparte)	
2019; 21st Quebec Cinema Awards	Maripier Morin	The Fall of the American Empire (La Chute de l'empire américain)	
2019; 21st Quebec Cinema Awards	Jacob Whiteduck-Lavoie	A Colony (Une colonie)	

== 2020s ==
Year	Performer	Film	Ref
2020; 22nd Quebec Cinema Awards
2020; 22nd Quebec Cinema Awards	Nahéma Ricci	Antigone	
2020; 22nd Quebec Cinema Awards	Catherine Chabot	Compulsive Liar (Menteur)	
2020; 22nd Quebec Cinema Awards	Sharon Fontaine-Ishpatao	Kuessipan	
2020; 22nd Quebec Cinema Awards	Alexane Jamieson	Young Juliette (Jeune Juliette)	
2020; 22nd Quebec Cinema Awards	Lilou Roy-Lanouette	Jouliks	
2021; 23rd Quebec Cinema Awards
2021; 23rd Quebec Cinema Awards	Kelly Depeault	Goddess of the Fireflies (La déesse des mouches à feu)	
2021; 23rd Quebec Cinema Awards	Jasmine Lemée	My Very Own Circus (Mon cirque à moi)	
2021; 23rd Quebec Cinema Awards	Rosalie Pépin	Vacarme	
2021; 23rd Quebec Cinema Awards	Joakim Robillard	Underground (Souterrain)	
2021; 23rd Quebec Cinema Awards	Arnaud Vachon	The Vinland Club (Le club Vinland)	
2022; 24th Quebec Cinema Awards
2022; 24th Quebec Cinema Awards	Sara Montpetit	Maria Chapdelaine	
2022; 24th Quebec Cinema Awards	Yonah Acosta	Without Havana (Sin la Habana)	
2022; 24th Quebec Cinema Awards	Rainbow Dickerson	Beans	
2022; 24th Quebec Cinema Awards	Jorge Antonio Guerrero	Drunken Birds (Les oiseaux ivres)	
2022; 24th Quebec Cinema Awards	Kiawentiio Tarbell	Beans	
2023; 25th Quebec Cinema Awards
2023; 25th Quebec Cinema Awards	Juliette Gariépy	Red Rooms (Les chambres rouges)	
2023; 25th Quebec Cinema Awards	Fabiola Nyrva Aladin	Viking	
2023; 25th Quebec Cinema Awards	Émi Chicoine	Noemie Says Yes (Noémie dit oui)	
2023; 25th Quebec Cinema Awards	Virginie Fortin	Two Days Before Christmas (23 décembre)	
2023; 25th Quebec Cinema Awards	Joan Hart	The Dishwasher (Le plongeur)	
2023; 25th Quebec Cinema Awards	François Pérusse	Niagara	
2024; 26th Quebec Cinema Awards
2024; 26th Quebec Cinema Awards	Ariane Castellanos	Richelieu	
2024; 26th Quebec Cinema Awards	Félix-Antoine Bénard	Humanist Vampire Seeking Consenting Suicidal Person (Vampire humaniste cherche suicidaire consentant)	
2024; 26th Quebec Cinema Awards	Chloé Djandji	Ru	
2024; 26th Quebec Cinema Awards	Shadi Janho	1995	
2024; 26th Quebec Cinema Awards	Chaïmaa Zineddine Elidrissi	Gamma Rays (Les Rayons gamma)	
2025; 27th Quebec Cinema Awards
2025; 27th Quebec Cinema Awards	Marguerite Laurence	Miss Boots (Mlle Bottine)	
2025; 27th Quebec Cinema Awards	Aurélia Arandi-Longpré	Who by Fire (Comme le feu)	
2025; 27th Quebec Cinema Awards	Juliette Bharucha	Blue Sky Jo (La petite et le vieux)	
2025; 27th Quebec Cinema Awards	Aksel Leblanc	Phoenixes (Phénix)	
2025; 27th Quebec Cinema Awards	Pirouz Nemati	Universal Language (Une langue universelle)	
