= The Mother Eagle =

2020 Canadian docudrama film

- French: Le Sang du pélican
- Directed by: Denis Boivin
- Written by: Denis Boivin
- Produced by: Denis Boivin
- Starring: Karen Elkin
- Cinematography: Bruno Carrière
- Edited by: Jason Careau-Hamel
- Music by: Gilles Ouellet
- Production company: Dionysos Productions
- Distributed by: Les Distributions Netima
- Release date: October 5, 2020
- Running time: 127 minutes
- Country: Canada
- Language: French

The Mother Eagle (French: Le Sang du pélican, lit. "The Blood of the Pelican") is a Canadian docudrama film, directed by Denis Boivin and released in 2020. The film blends historical reenactments of the life of Marie of the Incarnation (Karen Elkin), an Ursuline nun in New France who was instrumental in the founding of the historically significant Ursuline monastery in Montreal, with a contemporary story in which she returns to earth in the 2010s to assist the contemporary nuns who are leaving the facility due to their advancing age.

The film's cast includes Louis Carrière, Karl-Patrice Dupuis, Marcel Godbout, Perrine Gruson, Marie-Ginette Guay, Pierre Lebeau, Raymond Lemieux, David Noël, Suzanne Pineau and Louise Portal.

The film had its theatrical premiere in October 2020, before opening commercially in March 2021.
