= Lunar-Orbit Rendezvous =

2018 Canadian short film

- Directed by: Mélanie Charbonneau
- Written by: Frédéric Lemay
- Produced by: Virginie Nolin
- Starring: Frédéric Lemay; Noémie O'Farrell
- Cinematography: Ariel Méthot-Bellemare
- Edited by: Simon Sauvé
- Music by: Antoine Rochette
- Production company: Hutte Films
- Release date: August 8, 2018 (Locarno)
- Running time: 15 minutes
- Country: Canada
- Language: French

Lunar-Orbit Rendezvous is a Canadian short film, directed by Mélanie Charbonneau and released in 2018. The film stars Frédéric Lemay and Noémie O'Farrell as Daniel and Claude, a man and a woman who set off on a road trip, with Daniel dressed as an astronaut and Claude dressed as a tampon, in the hopes of reaching the moon, with Daniel hoping to scatter his late mother's ashes and Claude hoping that being on the moon will stabilize her menstrual cycle.

The film premiered at the 2018 Locarno Film Festival, and had its Canadian premiere at the 2018 Festival du nouveau cinéma.

The film was a Prix Iris nominee for Best Live Action Short Film at the 21st Quebec Cinema Awards in 2019.
