= Jasmine Lemée =

Canadian actress

Jasmine Lemée is a Canadian actress from Quebec. She is most noted for her performance in the film My Very Own Circus (Mon cirque à moi), for which she received a Prix Iris nomination for Revelation of the Year at the 23rd Quebec Cinema Awards in 2021.

She has also appeared in the films The Mirage (Le Mirage), Paul à Québec and Boundaries (Pays), and the television series Olivier, Ruptures, Mehdi et Val and The Night Logan Woke Up (La nuit où Laurier Gaudreault s'est réveillé).
