= The Hair of the Beast =

2010 Canadian comedy horror film

- French: Le Poil de la bète
- Directed by: Philippe Gagnon
- Written by: Pierre Daudelin; Stéphane J. Bureau
- Produced by: Réal Chabot
- Starring: Guillaume Lemay-Thivierge; Gilles Renaud; Patrice Robitaille; Viviane Audet
- Cinematography: Steve Asselin
- Edited by: Isabelle Malenfant
- Music by: Martin Roy
- Production company: Les Films du Boulevard
- Distributed by: Christal Films
- Release date: October 1, 2010
- Running time: 92 minutes
- Country: Canada
- Language: French

The Hair of the Beast (French: Le Poil de la bête) is a Canadian comedy horror film, directed by Philippe Gagnon and released in 2010.

Set in colonial New France in the 1660s, the film stars Guillaume Lemay-Thivierge as Joseph Côté, a man who has escaped from prison after being sentenced to death for a crime; hiding out in Beauport after taking on the identity of a Jesuit priest, he falls in love with Marie Labotte (Viviane Audet), a fille du roy whom nobody else wants to marry, while simultaneously discovering that he is the only one who can battle the werewolves who terrorize the community at night.

The cast also includes Gilles Renaud, Patrice Robitaille, Antoine Bertrand, Marc Beaupré, Marie-Chantal Perron, Sébastien Huberdeau, Mirianne Brûlé, Pierre-Luc Lafontaine, Martin Dubreuil, Marie-Thérèse Fortin, Patrick Drolet, Benoît McGinnis, Michel Barrette, Isabeau Blanche, Étienne Pilon and Virginie Morin.

== Production ==
The film went into production in fall 2009.

It was originally announced as the first part of a trilogy, with the other two films to be titled Les enfants de chienne and La mort aux dents, although the sequels never materialized.

== Awards ==
André Duval received a Jutra Award nomination for Best Hair at the 13th Jutra Awards in 2011.
