= The Vinland Club =

2020 Canadian film

- Film poster
- French: Le Club Vinland
- Directed by: Benoît Pilon
- Written by: Normand Bergeron; Benoît Pilon; Marc Robitaille
- Produced by: Chantal Lafleur
- Starring: Sébastien Ricard; Rémy Girard; François Papineau; Fabien Cloutier
- Cinematography: François Gamache
- Edited by: Richard Comeau
- Music by: Guido Del Fabbro; Pierre Lapointe
- Production company: Productions Avenida
- Distributed by: Les Films Opale
- Release date: August 2020
- Running time: 125 minutes
- Country: Canada
- Language: French

The Vinland Club (French: Le Club Vinland) is a Canadian drama film that was directed by Benoît Pilon and released in 2020. The film stars Sébastien Ricard as Frère Jean, a priest teaching at a private Roman Catholic school in the Charlevoix region of Quebec in the 1940s who enlists his students in a project to locate archaeological evidence of the ancient Norse settlement of Vinland.

The film's cast also includes Rémy Girard, François Papineau, Fabien Cloutier, Arnaud Vachon, Xavier Huard, Émilie Bibeau, Guy Thauvette, Guy Sprung, and Émile Schneider.

The film was originally slated for release on April 17, 2020, but that was delayed by the shutdown of movie theatres in light of the COVID-19 pandemic in Canada. The film had its world premiere at the Beijing International Film Festival in August 2020 and had its North American premiere later that year at the Abitibi-Témiscamingue International Film Festival on October 31.

== Awards and nominations ==
Award	Date of ceremony	Category	Recipient(s)	Result	Ref(s)
Prix Iris	June 6, 2021	Best Film	Chantal Lafleur	Nominated	
Prix Iris	June 6, 2021	Best Director	Benoît Pilon	Nominated	
Prix Iris	June 6, 2021	Best Actor	Sébastien Ricard	Won	
Prix Iris	June 6, 2021	Best Supporting Actor	Rémy Girard	Nominated	
Prix Iris	June 6, 2021	Revelation of the Year	Arnaud Vachon	Nominated	
Prix Iris	June 6, 2021	Best Screenplay	Normand Bergeron, Benoît Pilon, Marc Robitaille	Nominated	
Prix Iris	June 6, 2021	Best Art Direction	Patrice Bengle, Louise Tremblay	Won	
Prix Iris	June 6, 2021	Best Cinematography	François Gamache	Nominated	
Prix Iris	June 6, 2021	Best Costume Design	Francesca Chamberland	Won	
Prix Iris	June 6, 2021	Best Hair	André Duval	Nominated	
Prix Iris	June 6, 2021	Best Original Music	Guido Del Fabbro, Pierre Lapointe	Nominated	
Prix Iris	June 6, 2021	Best Casting	Pierre Pageau, Daniel Poisson	Nominated	
Prix Iris	June 6, 2021	Public Prize	Benoît Pilon, Chantal Lafleur	Nominated	
