= Maria (2021 film) =

2021 Canadian film

- Directed by: Alec Pronovost
- Written by: Mariana Mazza; Justine Philie
- Produced by: Nathalie Bustos
- Starring: Mariana Mazza
- Cinematography: Christophe Fortin
- Edited by: Charles Boisseau
- Music by: Alex Lefaivre
- Production company: Groupe Entourage
- Distributed by: TVA Films
- Release date: August 16, 2021 (Fantasia)
- Running time: 90 minutes
- Country: Canada

Maria is a Canadian comedy-drama film, directed by Alec Pronovost and released in 2021. The film stars Mariana Mazza as Maria, an aimless young woman who takes a job as a substitute teacher in a high school after promising her dying mother that she will make an effort to accomplish something in her life, despite her lack of education in how to teach students.

The cast also includes Alice Pascual, Florence Longpré, Isabel dos Santos, Louka Amadeo Bélanger-Leos, Arnaud Lemaire, Korine Côté, Rosalie Moreau, Liam Audet, Pascal Cameron, Laurent Lemaire, Isabella Villalba, Louis-Olivier Maufette, Christine Morency, Suzanne Champagne, Sasha Migliarese, Félix-Antoine Bénard and Daphnée Côté-Hallé, as well as cameo appearances by René Richard Cyr, Kathleen Fortin, Yves Jacques and Diane Lavallée.

The film premiered at the Fantasia Film Festival on August 16, 2021, before opening commercially on August 20.
