= Little Waves =

- French: Les petites vagues
- Directed by: Ariane Louis-Seize
- Written by: Ariane Louis-Seize
- Produced by: Jeanne-Marie Poulain
- Starring: Martin Desgagné; Véronique Gallant; Jules Roy Sicotte; Alexandra Sicard
- Cinematography: Shawn Pavlin
- Edited by: Emmanuelle Lane
- Music by: Anemone
- Production companies: Art & Essai
- Release date: 2018
- Running time: 13 minutes
- Country: Canada
- Language: French

Little Waves (French: Les petites vagues) is a 2018 Canadian short drama film, written and directed by Ariane Louis-Seize. The film centres on a young girl who experiences a sexual awakening after her cousin brings a new boyfriend to a family gathering for the first time.

The film was named to the Toronto International Film Festival's annual year-end Canada's Top Ten list for 2018.
