= Discussions avec mes parents =

Canadian television comedy series

- Starring: François Morency
- Country of origin: Canada
- No. of seasons: François Morency

Original release
- Network: Ici Radio-Canada Télé
- Release: September 10, 2018

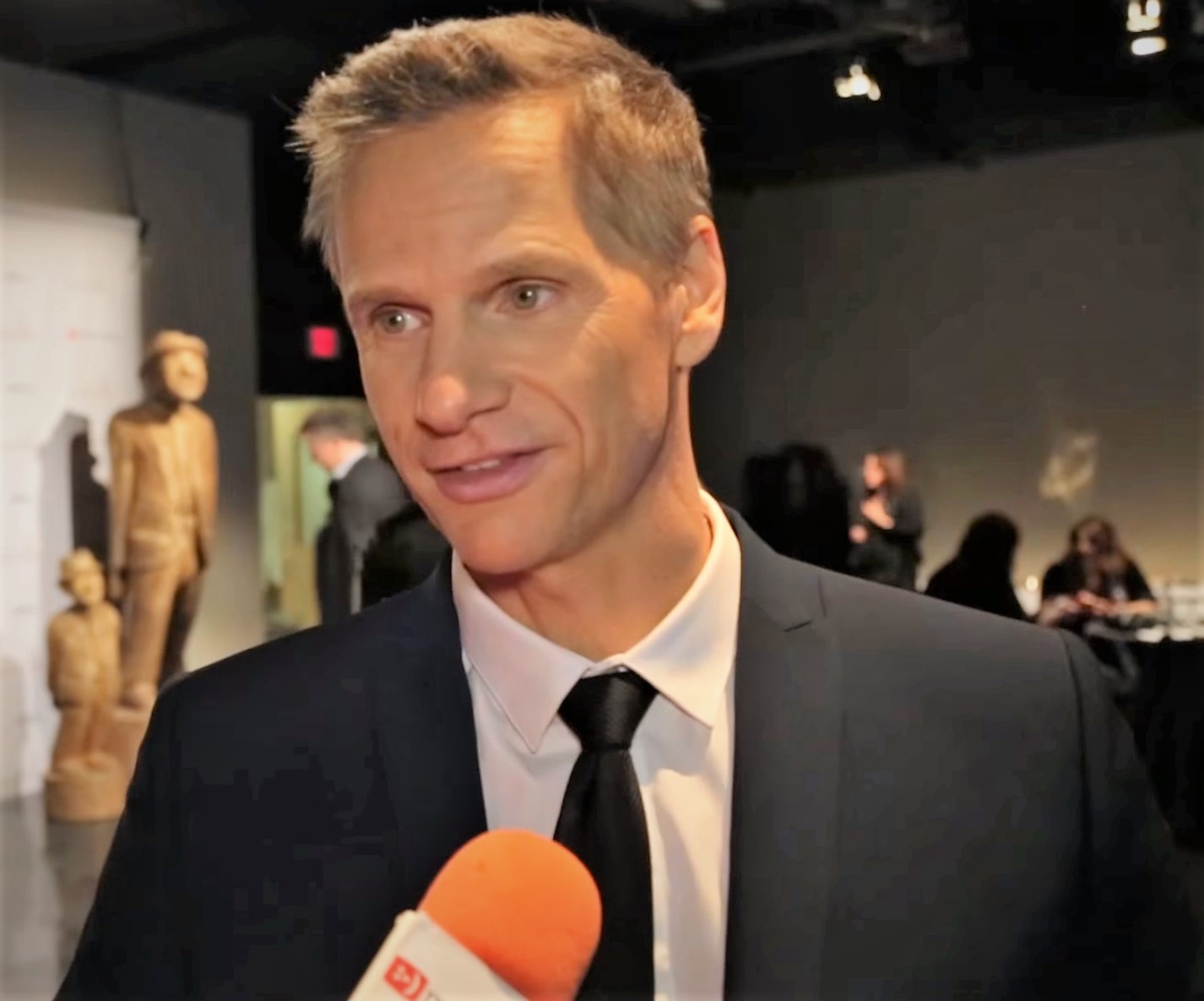
François Morency interviewed by Montreal.TV in 2016.

Discussions avec mes parents ("Conversations with My Parents") is a Canadian television comedy series, which premiered in 2018 on Ici Radio-Canada Télé. A fictionalized version of the life of comedian François Morency based on his book. The series is set in Quebec City and stars Morency as himself, alongside Vincent Bilodeau and Marie-Ginette Guay as his parents Jean-Pierre and Rollande, Blaise Tardif as his brother Reynald, and Caroline Bouchard as his sister Judith.

The series premiered on September 10, 2018, and was filmed in Montreal, Quebec. A second season aired in 2019, a third season aired in 2020, with a fourth season slated to air in 2021.

In June 2021, it was announced that NBCUniversal has purchased rights to produce an American remake of the series.
