= Félix-Antoine Bénard =

Canadian actor

Félix-Antoine Bénard is a Canadian actor from Quebec, most noted for his performance as Paul in the 2023 film Humanist Vampire Seeking Consenting Suicidal Person (Vampire humaniste cherche suicidaire consentant). He received a Canadian Screen Award nomination for Best Lead Performance in a Comedy Film at the 12th Canadian Screen Awards, and Prix Iris nominations for Best Actor and Revelation of the Year at the 26th Quebec Cinema Awards. Alongside Ariane Castellanos, he was one of the first two actors in the history of the Prix Iris to receive dual nominations, in both Revelation and one of the lead acting categories, for the same performance.

He has also appeared in the television series Béliveau, Bye Bye, L'Effet secondaire, Piégés, Comme des têtes pas de poule and La Faille, and the film Maria.
