= Omerta (TV series) =

Canadian TV series

- Genre: Drama
- Created by: Luc Dionne
- Country of origin: Canada
- Original language: French
- No. of seasons: 3
- No. of episodes: 38

Production
- Running time: 45 minutes

Original release
- Network: Canadian Broadcast Corporation
- Release: January 1996 – April 1999

Omertà or Omertà, The Code of Silence is a Quebec television series of 11 forty-five-minute episodes, created by Luc Dionne and aired from January to April 1996 on Radio-Canada. In France, the series aired on France 3 in 1998.

A second season, titled Omertà II – The Code of Silence, had 14 forty-five minute episodes and was broadcast between September and December 1997 on Radio-Canada.

A third season, titled Omerta, The Last Men of Honor, had 13 episodes and was broadcast from January to April 1999, on Radio-Canada.

In 2012 Dionne produced and released a feature film sequel to the series. The film won the Billet d'or at the 15th Jutra Awards as the top-grossing Quebec film of 2012.

== Synopsis ==
Omerta (which means code of silence) was a Canadian television drama series set in Montreal that chronicles a battle between the police and the Mafia. The police rely on inventive and unorthodox methods in their fight against the mobsters who follow their code loyally and cherish their family.

== Commercial success ==
Omerta was the second most popular series in Quebec television history. Filmed in French, it had a limited audience outside of francophone markets. An English series was planned as a result of this success. These plans were shelved with the launch of David Chase's HBO series The Sopranos which post dated and paralleled Omerta on many levels.

=== Season I ===
11 Episodes The National Security police squad hires investigator Pierre Gauthier (Michel Côté) and double agent François Pelletier (Luc Picard) to conduct a comprehensive survey aimed at shuttering the alleged godfather of the Mafia in Montreal, Giuseppe Scarfo (Dino Tavarone). In a clandestine manner, the director of the squad Gilbert Tanguay (Michael Dumont) delivers a vendetta and cons Scarfo who was caught in a love triangle for years. Gauthier has a passionate affair with the daughter of Scarfo, Gabrielle Provost (Brigitte Paquette).

=== Season II ===
14 episodes

While investigating the murder of an undercover officer, National Security discovers the links between organized crime, high finance and the Canadian intelligence service.

=== Season III ===
Episodes 1-6 An unprecedented internal war broke out in the Montreal Mafia, pitting Jimmy Vaccaro against Giuseppe Scarfo. The ambitious young gangster Nicky Balsamo (Orzari Romano) finds himself stuck between the two, as he tries to win back the heart of Vicky (Geneviève Rochette), the daughter of an Italian-Quebec politician.

Episodes 7-8 Having been forced into exile on the island of Caruba (imaginary country in the Caribbean, military dictatorship) following the murder of Jimmy Vaccaro, Nicky Balsamo began his own business while serving as an intermediary to the new Montreal godfather Gino Favara (Ron Lea ), which attempts to acquire a large shipment of gold from the Russian mafia. This plays an indirect role in events of the first two seasons that occur at the same time.

Episodes 9-13 Nicky Balsamo returned to Montreal for a position within the organization Gino while Pierre Gauthier (Michel Côte), being blackmailed, is forced to work for the Canadian Security Intelligence Service. Balsamo will be forced to make an alliance with Gauthier to protect Vicky.

== Distribution ==
=== Season I ===
- Michel Côté : Pierre Gauthier
- Luc Picard : François Pelletier
- Dino Tavarone : Giuseppe Scarfo
- Brigitte Paquette : Gabrielle Provost
- Michel Dumont : Gilbert Tanguay
- Claude Blanchard : Roger Perreault
- Sophie Lorain : Denise Deslongchamps
- Claude Michaud : Georges Lemire
- Vittorio Rossi : Tom Celano
- Serge Thériault : Guy Boisvert
- Sylvie Legault : Michèle Vallières
- Frank Schorpion : Terry O'neil
- Deano Clavet : Angelo «Angy» Bogliozzi
- Manuel Tadros : Frank Vastelli
- John Dunn-Hill : Marco D'Ascola
- Tony Conte : Vincenzo Spadollini
- Ron Lea : Gino Favara
- Claude Lemieux : Bertrand Fournel
- France Castel : Hélène Provost
- Daniel Gadouas : Laurent Daignault
- Roc Lafortune : Dave Lambert
- Guylaine Tremblay : Diane
- Louis Di Bianco : Carlo Lombardo
- Éric Hoziel : Gaétan Laflèche
- Richard Lemire : Yvon «le Pic» Cossette
- Michael D'Amico : Robert Sauvageau
- Michele Cadieux : Frank Vastelli’s Girlfriend

=== Season II ===
- Michel Côté : Pierre Gauthier
- Luc Picard : François Pelletier
- Ron Lea : Gino Favara
- Michel Dumont : Gilbert Tanguay
- Brigitte Paquette : Gabrielle Provost
- Sophie Lorain : Denise Deslongchamps
- David La Haye : Rick Bonnard
- Marc Messier : Paul Spencer
- Claude Michaud : Georges Lemire
- Sylvie Legault : Michèle Vallières
- Vittorio Rossi : Tom Celano
- Claude Maher : Guy Lalonde
- Sylvain Massé : Gilles Boisclair
- Germain Houde : Carol Léveillé
- Claude Blanchard : Roger Perreault
- — : Ronny Dante
- — : Roberto Panzonni
- Manuel Tadros : Frank Vastelli
- Louis Di Bianco : Carlo Lombardo
- Aubert Pallascio : John Slayton
- Jean-Pierre Bergeron : Marc-André Théoret
- Daniel Gadouas : Laurent Daignault
- Éric Hoziel : Gaétan Laflèche
- Richard Lemire : Yvon «le Pic» Cossette
- Claudia Ferri : Christina Panzonni
- — : Robert Sauvageau
- Claude Lemieux : Bertrand Fournel
- Bruno Pelletier : Michel Bergevin
- Jean-Claude Viens : Biker

=== Season III ===
- Romano Orzari : Nicola «Nicky» Balsamo
- Geneviève Rochette : Victoria «Vicky» Sogliuzzo
- Ron Lea : Gino Favara
- Paolo Noël : Tony Potenzza
- Michel Côté : Pierre Gauthier
- Tony De Santis : Jimmy Vaccaro
- Dino Tavarone : Giuseppe Scarfo
- Vittorio Rossi : Tom Celano
- Richard Robitaille : Blackburn, alias «Linda Monette»
- Claude Blanchard : Roger Perreault
- — : Ronny Dante
- Germain Houde : Carol Léveillé
- Roberto Medile : Agostino Sogliuzzo
- — : Pierre Lavoie
- — : Jeremy
- — : Normand, amant de Vicky
- Tony Conte : Vincenzo Spadollini
- Emidio Michetti : Andrea Balsamo
- Dennis O'Connor : «Fatso» Montemilio
- — : Gerry Assete
- Claudia Ferri : Christina Panzonni
- Louis Di Bianco : Carlo Lombardo
- — : Tony Barbella
- — : Général Mandèz
- Tony Calabretta : Louis Russo
- Deano Clavet : Angelo «Angy» Bogliozzi
- John Dunn-Hill : Marco D'Ascola
- Éric Hoziel : Gaétan Laflèche
- Bruno Diquinzio : Tony «two»
- — : Pasquale
- — : Mme Sogliuzzo
- Andrée Champagne : Juge
- — : Avocat de Jimmy
- Jean-Guy Moreau : Réal Vincent
- — : Alain Valois
- Roger Léger: Corto
- — : Procureur de la couronne
- Claude Lemieux: Bertrand Fournel

Marcel LeBoeuf dans Marcel LeBoeuf

== Awards ==
- Gemini: Best Drama Series 1996
- Gemini: Best Drama Series 1998
- Gemini: Best Drama Series 1999

== Chronology ==
=== 1973 ===
Season III – Episode 1

=== 1983 ===
Season III – Episode 1

=== 1993 ===
Season III – Episode 1

=== 1994 ===
Season III – Episodes 2-6

=== 1995 ===
Season I – 11 Episodes

Season III – Episode 7

=== 1997 ===
Season II – 14 Episodes

Season III – Episodes 8-9

=== 1998 ===
Season III – Episodes 9-13
