= Ariane Castellanos =

Canadian actress

Ariane Castellanos is a Canadian actress from Quebec. She is most noted for her performance in the film Richelieu, for which she received a Canadian Screen Award nomination for Best Lead Performance in a Drama Film at the 12th Canadian Screen Awards, and won the Prix Iris for both Best Actress and Revelation of the Year at the 26th Quebec Cinema Awards. Alongside Félix-Antoine Bénard, she was one of the first two actors in the history of the Prix Iris to receive dual nominations, in both Revelation and one of the lead acting categories, for the same performance.

Of mixed Guatemalan and québécoise descent, she has spoken about the career challenges she has faced by being typecast for specifically Latina roles, which are relatively rare in the cinema of Quebec.

Her television roles have included the series Mémoires vives, Baby Boom, Hubert et Fanny and Temps de chien.

She has also worked as a casting director, winning the Prix Iris for Best Casting at the 21st Quebec Cinema Awards in 2019 for A Colony (Une colonie). She was also involved in the casting of Richelieu, for which she received a CSA nomination for Best Casting in a Film, and a Prix Iris nomination for Best Casting.
