= Nermin Grbic =

Canadian hairstylist

Nermin Grbić is a Canadian hairstylist. He is most noted for his work on the film The Twentieth Century, for which he won both the Canadian Screen Award for Best Hair at the 8th Canadian Screen Awards and the Prix Iris for Best Hair at the 22nd Quebec Cinema Awards.

His other credits have included the films 1987, Hochelaga, Land of Souls (Hochelaga, terre des âmes), The Little Girl Who Was Too Fond of Matches (La petite fille qui aimait trop les allumettes), Family First (Chien de garde), The Fireflies Are Gone (La disparition des lucioles), Kuessipan, The Acrobat (L'Acrobate), and The Decline (Jusqu'au déclin).
