= The Night Logan Woke Up =

Canadian thriller drama limited television series

- French: La nuit où Laurier Gaudreault s'est réveillé
- Created by: Xavier Dolan
- Based on: La nuit où Laurier Gaudreault s'est réveillé by Michel Marc Bouchard
- Written by: Xavier Dolan
- Directed by: Xavier Dolan
- Starring: Julie Le Breton; Anne Dorval; Patrick Hivon; Jasmine Lemée; Pier-Gabriel Lajoie
- Music by: Hans Zimmer; David Fleming
- Country of origin: Canada
- Original language: French
- No. of episodes: 5

Production
- Executive producers: Harry Grivakis; Javi Hernandez
- Producers: Xavier Dolan; Nancy Grant; Jasmyrh Lemoine
- Production location: Canada
- Cinematography: André Turpin
- Editor: Xavier Dolan
- Production companies: Productions Nanoby; Canal+; Québecor Contenu

Original release
- Network: Club Illico
- Release: November 24, 2022

The Night Logan Woke Up (French: La nuit où Laurier Gaudreault s'est réveillé) is a Canadian thriller drama limited television series created and directed by Xavier Dolan. Adapted from the theatrical play La nuit où Laurier Gaudreault s'est réveillé by Michel Marc Bouchard, the series centres on the Larouches, a family in Val-des-Chutes, Quebec, who are coping with the death of family matriarch Madeleine (Anne Dorval).

The cast also includes Patrick Hivon as the adult Jules/Julien, Éric Bruneau as brother Denis, Dolan as youngest brother Elliot, and Magalie Lépine-Blondeau as Julien's wife Chantal, as well as Julianne Côté, Guylaine Tremblay, Jacques Lavallée and Sylvie Drapeau in supporting roles. Much of the core cast played the Larouches in the original 2019 stage production of Bouchard's play.

== Premise ==
The series alternates between the present day, when prodigal daughter Mimi/Mireille (Julie Le Breton), a prominent thanatologist, returns home for the first time in decades. She honours her mother's dying request that she embalm the body. The present is sometimes displaced by flashbacks to the early 1990s, when the young Mireille (Jasmine Lemée) and her brother Jules/Julien (Elijah Patrice-Baudelot) were close friends with Logan Goodyear/Laurier Gaudreault (Pier-Gabriel Lajoie) until the event that shattered the family.

== Cast ==
- Julie Le Breton as Mimi/Mireille
- Anne Dorval as Madeleine
- Patrick Hivon as adult Jules/Julien
  - Elijah Patrice-Baudelot as young Jules/Julien
- Jasmine Lemée as Mireille
- Xavier Dolan as Elliot
- Pier-Gabriel Lajoie as Logan Goodyear/Laurier Gaudreault
- Magalie Lépine-Blondeau as Chantal
- Julianne Côté
- Guylaine Tremblay
- Jacques Lavallée
- Sylvie Drapeau

== Episodes ==
No.	Title	Directed by	Written by	Original release date
1	"La nuit où Madeleine est morte"	Xavier Dolan	Xavier Dolan	November 24, 2022
2	"La nuit où Mireille était reparue"	Xavier Dolan	Xavier Dolan	November 24, 2022
3	"La nuit où Chantal avait compris"	Xavier Dolan	Xavier Dolan	November 24, 2022
4	"La nuit où Julien avait pris peur"	Xavier Dolan	Xavier Dolan	November 24, 2022
5	"La nuit où Laurier Gaudreault s'est réveillé"	Xavier Dolan	Xavier Dolan	November 24, 2022

== Release ==
The series premiered in Canada on November 24, 2022, on Club Illico, and January 23, 2023, on Canal+ in France. The first two episodes screened in the Indie Episodic program at the 2023 Sundance Film Festival. The series premiered in the US on Netflix later that year, on October 18, 2023.

== Accolades ==
The series won six Prix Gémeaux: Best Direction, Best Leading Role in a Drama Series, Best Supporting Role in a Drama Series, Best Editing, Best Cinematography and Best Original Music.

Year	Award / Festival	Category	Recipient(s)	Result	Ref.
2023	Prix Gémeaux	Best Drama Series	Xavier Dolan, Nancy Grant	Nominated	
2023	Prix Gémeaux	Best Direction - Drama Series	Xavier Dolan	Won	
2023	Prix Gémeaux	Best Writing - Drama Series	Xavier Dolan	Nominated	
2023	Prix Gémeaux	Best Cinematography - Drama	André Turpin	Won	
2023	Prix Gémeaux	Best Editing - Fiction	Xavier Dolan and Stéphane Lafleur	Won	
2023	Prix Gémeaux	Best Leading Role in a Drama Series	Patrick Hivon	Won	
2023	Prix Gémeaux	Best Leading Role in a Drama Series	Julie LeBreton	Nominated	
2023	Prix Gémeaux	Best Supporting Role in a Drama Series	Anne Dorval	Won	
2023	Prix Gémeaux	Best Supporting Role in a Drama Series	Xavier Dolan	Nominated	
2023	Prix Gémeaux	Best Original Music - Drama	David Fleming and Hans Zimmer	Won	
2023	Prix Gémeaux	Best Make-Up/Hair	Christophe Giraud, Erik Gosselin, Colette Martel and Edwina Voda	Nominated	
2023	Prix Gémeaux	Best Set Design	Carolyne de Bellefeuille, Elise de Blois and Pascale Deschênes	Nominated	
2023	Film Festival Cologne	The Hollywood Reporter Award	Xavier Dolan	Won	
