= François Gamache =

Canadian cinematographer

François Gamache is a Canadian cinematographer. He is most noted for his work on the film The Vinland Club (Le Club Vinland), for which he received a Prix Iris nomination for Best Cinematography at the 23rd Quebec Cinema Awards in 2021.
