= Vinegar Strokes =

British drag performer

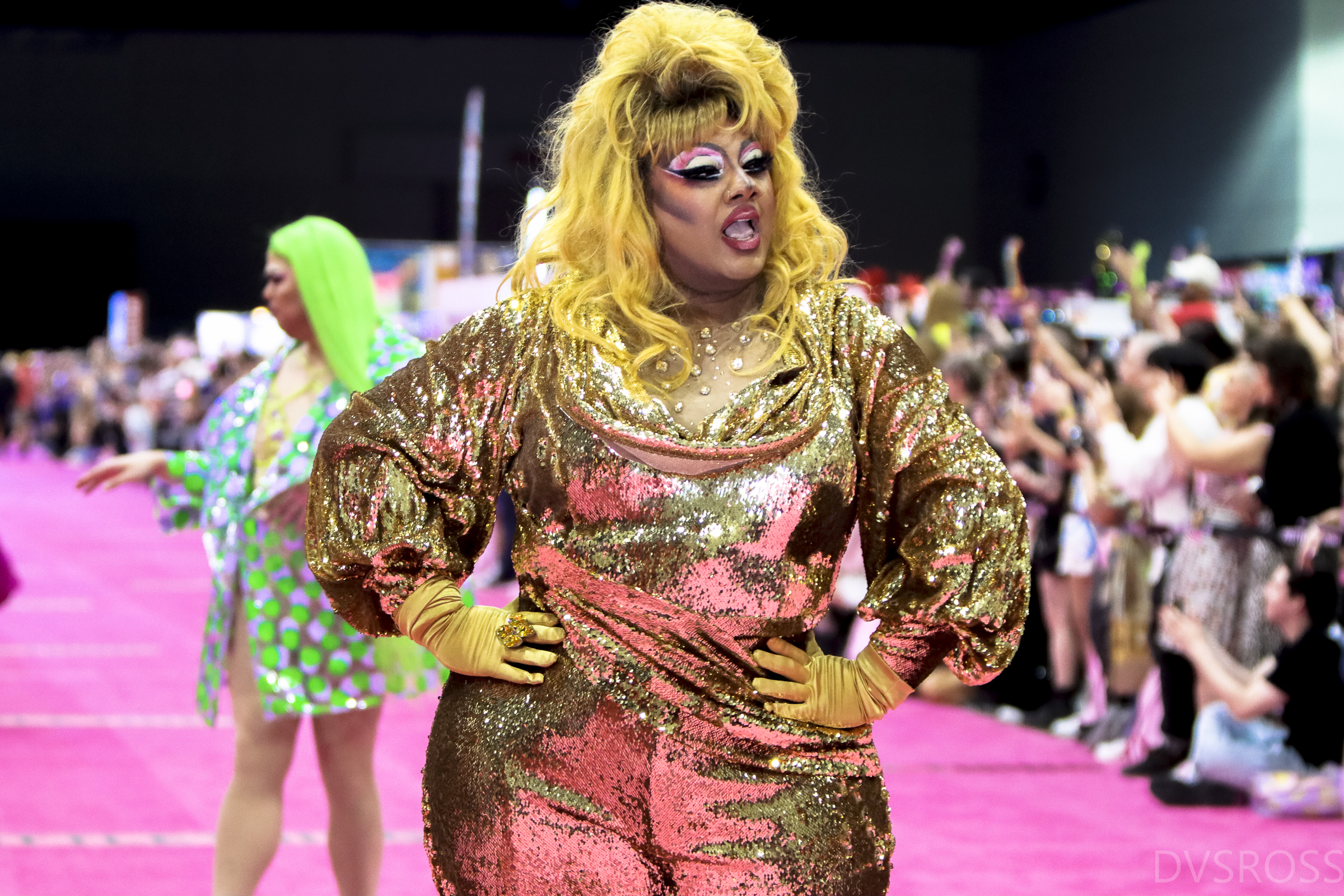
- Vinegar Strokes at RuPaul's DragCon LA, 2022
- Born: Daniel Jacob; 21 August 1984 (age 42); London, United Kingdom
- Education: Liverpool Institute for Performing Arts (BA)
- Occupation: Drag queen
- Television: RuPaul's Drag Race UK (series 1)

Vinegar Strokes (born 21 August 1984) is the stage name of Daniel Jacob, a drag queen from London.

She has released some songs: "Clamp!" (2019) and "Surrender" (2020).

== Early life ==
Jacob is of Jamaican descent. Before performing in drag, he studied at the Liverpool Institute for Performing Arts in order to become an actor. However, he did not get any acting jobs until adopting the Vinegar Strokes persona.

== Career ==
She is known for her appearance on the first series of RuPaul's Drag Race UK, as well as performing with Drag Race judge Michelle Visage and US Drag Race winner Bianca Del Rio in the West End Musical Everybody's Talking About Jamie.

After Drag Race, Strokes played Lady Von Fistenberg in the "camp drag murder mystery" play Death Drop.

She has also her music singles to YouTube, as well as an online cooking series.

She voices the character Lucretious in Baldur's Gate 3 (2023).

Most recently, Vinegar Strokes has filled the role of ‘The Diva’ on the Virgin Voyages ship, The Scarlet Lady.

== Discography ==
=== Singles ===
- Camp! (2019)
- Surrender (2020)

As featured artist

- Dance All Night (Robyn Banks) (2022)

== Filmography ==
=== Television ===
Year	Title	Role	Notes
2019	RuPaul's Drag Race UK	Herself	Contestant; Series 1
2021	Celebrity Karaoke Club Drag Edition	Herself	Contestant
2021	Call Me Mother	Herself	Guest; 1 episode

=== Video games ===
Year	Title	Role	Notes
2023	Baldur's Gate 3	Lucretious	

=== Web series ===
Year	Title	Role	Notes	Ref.
2020	Cosmo Queens	Herself	Guest appearance	
2020	God Shave the Queens	Herself	World of Wonder docu-series	
2022	Bring Back My Girls	Herself		
