= 27th Quebec Cinema Awards =

2025 Canadian film awards ceremony

The 27th Quebec Cinema Awards was held on December 7, 2025, to honour achievements in the Cinema of Quebec in 2024 and 2025. The ceremony was broadcast by Noovo, and hosted by Phil Roy for a second year in a row.

The artisans gala, presenting the craft awards not included in the broadcast ceremony, was held on December 4 and hosted by Mona de Grenoble, also for the second year in a row.

== Overview of nominations ==
Matthew Rankin's Universal Language received the most nominations with seventeen and ended up winning a leading eight awards, including Best Film, Best Director and Best Screenplay, as well as Best Supporting Actor for Mani Soleymanlou and Best Supporting Actress for Danielle Fichaud.

Two Women (Deux femmes en or) and Peak Everything (Amour Apocalypse) received fifteen nominations each and respectively won Best Actress for Karine Gonthier-Hyndman and Best Actor for Patrick Hivon. Shepherds (Bergers), which received thirteen nominations, won four technical awards.

For the second year in a row, three women were nominated for Best Director. Actress Marguerite Laurence became the third person to receive dual acting nominations for the same performance, earning nods in the Best Actress and Revelation of the Year for her performance in Miss Boots (Mlle Bottine). She ultimately won the latter.

Sound mixer Bernard Gariépy Strobl received his 31st and 32nd nominations overall, surpassing Xavier Dolan to become the most nominated individual in the history of the Prix Iris, formerly known as the Prix Jutra.

A new category was introduced for this ceremony. Modeled after the Most Successful Film Outside Quebec award, the award for Most Successful Short Film Outside Quebec rewards the short film that shined the most on the international stage.

Filmmaker Léa Pool was named as the recipient of the Tribute Award on October 27, 2025.

== Nominees and winners ==
Best Film	Best Director
Universal Language (Une langue universelle) — Sylvain Corbeil; Blue Sky Jo (La petite et le vieux) — Sonia Despars, Marc Biron; Miss Boots (Mlle Bottine) — Antonello Cozzolino, Brigitte Léveillé, Dominic James; Peak Everything (Amour apocalypse) — Sylvain Corbeil; Shepherds (Bergers) — Luc Déry, Kim McCraw, Élaine Hébert, Caroline Bonmarchand, Xenia Sulyma; Two Women (Deux femmes en or) — Martin Paul-Hus, Catherine Léger; Who by Fire (Comme le feu) — Galilé Marion-Gauvin, Thomas Ordonneau	Matthew Rankin, Universal Language (Une langue universelle); Sophie Deraspe, Shepherds (Bergers); Anne Émond, Peak Everything (Amour apocalypse); Philippe Lesage, Who by Fire (Comme le feu); Chloé Robichaud, Two Women (Deux femmes en or)
Best Actor	Best Actress
Patrick Hivon, Peak Everything (Amour apocalypse); Paul Ahmarani, Who by Fire (Comme le feu); Antoine Bertrand, Miss Boots (Mlle Bottine); Félix-Antoine Duval, Shepherds (Bergers); Gildor Roy, Blue Sky Jo (La petite et le vieux)	Karine Gonthier-Hyndman, Two Women (Deux femmes en or); Leïla Bekhti, Once Upon My Mother (Ma mère, Dieu et Sylvie Vartan); Anne-Élisabeth Bossé, Compulsive Liar 2 (Menteuse); Marguerite Laurence, Miss Boots (Mlle Bottine); Laurence Leboeuf, Two Women (Deux femmes en or)
Best Supporting Actor	Best Supporting Actress
Mani Soleymanlou, Universal Language (Une langue universelle); Alexis Martin, Vile & Miserable (Vil & Misérable); Vincent-Guillaume Otis, Blue Sky Jo (La petite et le vieux); François Papineau, You Are Not Alone (Vous n'êtes pas seuls); Gilles Renaud, Peak Everything (Amour apocalypse)	Danielle Fichaud, Universal Language (Une langue universelle); Catherine Chabot, Compulsive Liar 2 (Menteuse); Sophie Desmarais, Who by Fire (Comme le feu); Chantal Fontaine, Vile & Miserable (Vil & Misérable); Juliette Gariépy, Two Women (Deux femmes en or)
Revelation of the Year	Best Screenplay
Marguerite Laurence, Miss Boots (Mlle Bottine); Aurélia Arandi-Longpré, Who by Fire (Comme le feu); Juliette Bharucha, Blue Sky Jo (La petite et le vieux); Aksel Leblanc, Phoenixes (Phénix); Pirouz Nemati, Universal Language (Une langue universelle)	Matthew Rankin, Ila Firouzabadi and Pirouz Nemati, Universal Language (Une langue universelle); Sophie Deraspe and Mathyas Lefebure, Shepherds (Bergers); Anne Émond, Peak Everything (Amour apocalypse); Catherine Léger, Two Women (Deux femmes en or); Philippe Lesage, Who by Fire (Comme le feu)
Best Documentary	Best Short Documentary
Intercepted — Oksana Karpovych, Rocío Barba Fuentes, Giacomo Nudi, Pauline Tran Van Lieu, Lucie Rego, Darya Bassel, Olha Beskhmelnytsina; Among Mountains and Streams (Parmi les montagnes et les ruisseaux) — Jean-François Lesage; The Battle of Saint-Léonard (La bataille de Saint-Léonard) — Félix Rose, Karine Dubois; I Shall Not Hate — Tal Barda, Geoff Klein, Saskia de Boer, Maryse Rouillard, Paul Cadieux, Isabelle Gripon; Simon and Marianne (Simon et Marianne) — Pier-Luc Latulippe, Martin Fournier	Who Loves the Sun — Arshia Shakiba, Zaynê Akyol; After the Silence (Après le silence) — Matilde-Luna Perotti; Like a Spiral (Comme une spirale) — Lamia Chraibi, Patricia Bergeron, Ghassan Fayad; The Punk of Natashquan (Le Punk de Natashquan) — Nicolas Lachapelle, Élodie Pollet; My Memory-Walls (Mes murs-mémoire) — Axel Robin
Best Live Action Short Film	Best Animated Short Film
Mercenaire — Pier-Philippe Chevigny, Geneviève Gosselin-G.; Fantas — Halima Elkhatabi; Gender Reveal — Mo Matton, Léonie Hurtubise; Platanero — Juan Frank Hernandez, Vincent Labelle, Laurence Ly, Béatrice Moukhaiber; Rituals Under a Scarlet Sky (Rituels sous un ciel écarlate) — Dominique Chila, Samer Najari, Galilé Marion-Gauvin	Maybe Elephants — Torill Kove, Lise Fearnley, Tonje Skar Reiersen, Maral Mohammadian; Ibuka, Justice — Justice Rutikara, Mylène Augustin; The Little Ancestor (Le Petit ancêtre) — Alexa Tremblay-Francœur, Stéphanie Gagné; Out for Ice Cream (Crème à glace) — Rachel Samson, Raquel Sancinetti, Félix Dufour-Laperrière; The Painting (Le Tableau) — Michèle Lemieux, Christine Noël, Julie Roy
Best Art Direction	Best Costume Design
Louisa Schabas, Universal Language (Une langue universelle); André-Line Beauparlant, Shepherds (Bergers); Ludovic Dufresne, Vile & Miserable (Vil & Misérable); Sylvain Lemaitre, Peak Everything (Amour apocalypse); Louisa Schabas, Two Women (Deux femmes en or)	Gabrielle Lauzier, Vile & Miserable (Vil & Misérable); Patricia McNeil, Peak Everything (Amour apocalypse); Patricia McNeil, Two Women (Deux femmes en or); Negar Nemati, Universal Language (Une langue universelle); Sharon Scott, Miss Boots (Mlle Bottine)
Best Cinematography	Best Cinematography in a Documentary
Vincent Gonneville, Shepherds (Bergers); Olivier Gossot, Peak Everything (Amour apocalypse); Mathieu Laverdière, The Last Meal (Le Dernier repas); Sara Mishara, Two Women (Deux femmes en or); Isabelle Stachtchenko, Universal Language (Une langue universelle)	Glauco Bermudez and Étienne Roussy, Ghosts of the Sea (Les enfants du large); Hanna Abu Saada, I Shall Not Hate; Sébastien Blais, Okurimono; Christian Mathieu Fournier, Waiting for Casimir (En attendant Casimir); Étienne Roussy, Among Mountains and Streams (Parmi les montagnes et les ruisseaux)
Best Editing	Best Editing in a Documentary
Stéphane Lafleur, Shepherds (Bergers); Matthieu Bouchard and Chloé Robichaud, Two Women (Deux femmes en or); Xi Feng, Universal Language (Une langue universelle); Amélie Labrèche, You Are Not Alone (Vous n'êtes pas seuls); Anita Roth, Peak Everything (Amour apocalypse)	Charlotte Tourrès, Intercepted; Heidi Haines, At All Kosts (Koutkékout); Josiane Lapointe, Alexandre Leblanc and Lawrence Côté-Collins, Billy; Catherine Legault, Larry (They/Them) (Larry (iel)); Michel Giroux, The Battle of Saint-Léonard (La bataille de Saint-Léonard)
Best Original Music	Best Original Music in a Documentary
Philippe Brault, Shepherds (Bergers); Amir Amiri and Christophe Lamarche-Ledoux, Universal Language (Une langue universelle); Viviane Audet, Robin-Joël Cool and Alexis Martin, Blue Sky Jo (La petite et le vieux); Philippe Brault, Two Women (Deux femmes en or); Pierre-Philippe Côté, You Are Not Alone (Vous n'êtes pas seuls); Christophe Lamarche-Ledoux, Peak Everything (Amour apocalypse)	Benoit Pinette and Marc-André Landry, Simon and Marianne (Simon et Marianne); Wilhelm Brandl, Okurimono; Marc Gravel, The Battle of Saint-Léonard (La bataille de Saint-Léonard); Martin Lizotte, Waiting for Casimir (En attendant Casimir); Martin Roy and Luc Sicard, Billy
Best Sound	Best Sound in a Documentary
Olivier Calvert, Stephen De Oliveira and Hans Laitres, Shepherds (Bergers); Jean-Sébastien Beaudoin-Gagnon, Simon Gervais and Bernard Gariépy Strobl, Vile & Miserable (Vil & Misérable); Sylvain Bellemare, Stephen De Oliveira and Luc Boudrias, Two Women (Deux femmes en or); Sylvain Brassard and Stephen De Oliveira, Peak Everything (Amour apocalypse); Pablo Villegas, Sacha Ratcliffe and Bernard Gariépy Strobl, Universal Language (Une langue universelle)	Alex Lane and Artem Kosynskyi, Intercepted; Olivier Calvert, Pier-Luc Latulippe and Bruno Bélanger, Simon and Marianne (Simon et Marianne); Benoît Dame, Vuk Stojanović, Alexandre Leblanc, Mathieu Lacourse and Martin M. Messier, Billy; Camille Demers-Lambert, Marie-Pierre Grenier and Olivier Germain, Okurimono; Simon Gervais, Laurence Turcotte-Fraser and Nicolas Dallaire, The Battle of Saint-Léonard (La bataille de Saint-Léonard)
Best Hairstyling	Best Makeup
Jeanne Milon, Once Upon My Mother (Ma mère, Dieu et Sylvie Vartan); Vincent Dufault, Two Women (Deux femmes en or); Nermin Grbic, Peak Everything (Amour apocalypse); Nermin Grbic, Universal Language (Une langue universelle); Jonathan Paulin, Vile & Miserable (Vil & Misérable)	Léonie Lévesque-Robert, Bruno Gatien, Stefan Ashdown and Caroline Aquin, Vile & Miserable (Vil & Misérable); Djina Caron, Two Women (Deux femmes en or); Jeanne Lafond, Compulsive Liar 2 (Menteuse); Marie Salvado, Peak Everything (Amour apocalypse); Marie Salvado, Universal Language (Une langue universelle)
Best Visual Effects	Best Casting
Olivier Masson, Peak Everything (Amour apocalypse); Jean-François « Jafaz » Ferland, Marie-Claude Lafontaine and Marc Morissette, Shepherds (Bergers); Marc Hall and David Atexide, Vile & Miserable (Vil & Misérable); Sam Javanrouh, Universal Language (Une langue universelle); François Trudel and Cynthia Mourou, You Are Not Alone (Vous n'êtes pas seuls)	Marilou Richer and Ila Firouzabadi, Universal Language (Une langue universelle); Nathalie Boutrie, Hannah Antaki and Jon Comerford, Peak Everything (Amour apocalypse); Catherine Didelot, Constance Demontoy and Maxime Giroux, Who by Fire (Comme le feu); Adélaïde Mauvernay and Nathalie Boutrie, Shepherds (Bergers); Karel Quinn and Lucie Llopis, Two Women (Deux femmes en or)
Most Successful Film Outside Quebec	Most Successful Short Film Outside Quebec
Universal Language (Une langue universelle) — Sylvain Corbeil, Matthew Rankin, Ila Firouzabadi, Pirouz Nemati; Hola Frida! — Florence Roche, André Kadi, Laurence Petit, Carole Scotta, Eliott Khayat, Karine Vézina; Intercepted — Oksana Karpovych, Rocío Barba Fuentes, Giacomo Nudi, Pauline Tran Van Lieu, Lucie Rego, Darya Bassel, Olha Beskhmelnytsina; Shepherds (Bergers) — Luc Déry, Kim McCraw, Élaine Hébert, Caroline Bonmarchand, Xenia Sulyma, Sophie Deraspe, Mathyas Lefebure; Who by Fire (Comme le feu) — Galilé Marion-Gauvin, Philippe Lesage	Who Loves the Sun — Arshia Shakiba, Zaynê Akyol; Gender Reveal — Mo Matton, Léonie Hurtubise; Maybe Elephants — Torill Kove, Lise Fearnley, Tonje Skar Reiersen, Maral Mohammadian; Mercenaire — Pier-Philippe Chevigny, Geneviève Gosselin-G.; perfectly a strangeness — Justine Baillargeon, Alison McAlpine
Best First Film	Prix Michel-Côté
Vile & Miserable (Vil & Misérable) — Jean-François Leblanc, Samuel Cantin; A Christmas Storm (Le Cyclone de Noël) — Alain Chicoine; The Last Meal (Le Dernier repas) — Maryse Legagneur, Luis Molinié; Who Do I Belong To (Là d'où l'on vient) — Meryam Joobeur; You Are Not Alone (Vous n'êtes pas seuls) — Marie-Hélène Viens, Philippe Lupien	A Christmas Storm (Le Cyclone de Noël) — Alain Chicoine, Mia Desroches, Christian Larouche, Sébastien Létourneau, Louis-Philippe Drolet, Louis Morissette, Mélanie Viau, Dominic Anctil, Marie-Élène Grégoire, Louis-Philippe Rivard; Blue Sky Jo (La petite et le vieux) — Sonia Despars, Marc Biron, Yoann Sauvageau, Patrice Sauvé, Sébastien Girard; Compulsive Liar 2 (Menteuse) — Patrick Roy, André Dupuy, Marie-Alexandra Forget, Émile Gaudreault, Eric K. Boulianne, Sébastien Ravary; Miss Boots (Mlle Bottine) — Antonello Cozzolino, Brigitte Léveillé, Dominic James, Patrick Roy, Yan Lanouette Turgeon; Shepherds (Bergers) — Luc Déry, Kim McCraw, Élaine Hébert, Caroline Bonmarchand, Xenia Sulyma, Chantal Pagé, Sophie Deraspe, Mathyas Lefebure
Iris Tribute
Léa Pool

== Multiple nominations ==
=== Films with multiple nominations ===
Nominations	Film
17	Universal Language (Une langue universelle)
15	Peak Everything (Amour apocalypse)
15	Two Women (Deux femmes en or)
13	Shepherds (Bergers)
9	Vile & Miserable (Vil & Misérable)
8	Who by Fire (Comme le feu)
6	Blue Sky Jo (La petite et le vieux)
6	Miss Boots (Mlle Bottine)
5	You Are Not Alone (Vous n'êtes pas seuls)
4	The Battle of Saint-Léonard (La bataille de Saint-Léonard)
4	Compulsive Liar 2 (Menteuse)
4	Intercepted
3	Billy
3	Okurimono
3	Simon and Marianne (Simon et Marianne)
2	Among Mountains and Streams (Parmi les montagnes et les ruisseaux)
2	A Christmas Storm (Le Cyclone de Noël)
2	Gender Reveal
2	I Shall Not Hate
2	The Last Meal (Le Dernier repas)
2	Maybe Elephants
2	Mercenaire
2	Once Upon My Mother (Ma mère, Dieu et Sylvie Vartan)
2	Waiting for Casimir (En attendant Casimir)
2	Who Loves the Sun

=== Films with multiple wins ===
Wins	Film
8	Universal Language (Une langue universelle)
4	Shepherds (Bergers)
3	Intercepted
3	Vile & Miserable (Vil & Misérable)
2	Peak Everything (Amour apocalypse)
2	Who Loves the Sun

== See also ==
- 26th Quebec Cinema Awards
- Gala Québec Cinéma
