= Prix Iris for Most Successful Short Film Outside Quebec =

Annual Canadian film award

The Prix Iris for Most Successful Short Film Outside Quebec (French: Prix Iris du court ou moyen métrage s’étant le plus illustré à l’extérieur du Québec) is an annual film award presented by Québec Cinéma as part of the Prix Iris awards program, to honour short films made within the Cinema of Quebec which have had significant success beyond the province, both in English Canada and internationally. The award is open to short films regardless of genre, inclusive of live action, animated and documentary shorts.

For the purposes of the award, "success" is calculated as a weighted formula incorporating a variety of factors, including box office tallies, film festival bookings, awards and sales to international distributors. Modeled on the organization's existing Prix Iris for Most Successful Film Outside Quebec, the short film category was introduced in 2025 and was presented for the first time at the 27th Quebec Cinema Awards.

== 2020s ==
Year	Film	Filmmakers	Ref
2025; 27th Quebec Cinema Awards
2025; 27th Quebec Cinema Awards	Who Loves the Sun	Arshia Shakiba, Zaynê Akyol	
2025; 27th Quebec Cinema Awards	Gender Reveal	Mo Matton, Léonie Hurtubise	
2025; 27th Quebec Cinema Awards	Maybe Elephants	Torill Kove, Lise Fearnley, Tonje Skar Reiersen, Maral Mohammadian	
2025; 27th Quebec Cinema Awards	Mercenaire	Pier-Philippe Chevigny, Geneviève Gosselin-G.	
2025; 27th Quebec Cinema Awards	perfectly a strangeness	Justine Baillargeon, Alison McAlpine	
