= L.A. Tea Time =

- Directed by: Sophie Bédard Marcotte
- Written by: Sophie Bédard Marcotte
- Produced by: Caroline Galipeau
- Starring: Sophie Bédard Marcotte; Isabelle Stachtchenko
- Cinematography: Isabelle Stachtchenko
- Edited by: Joël Morin-Ben Abdallah
- Production company: Maestro Films
- Distributed by: La Distributice de films
- Release date: April 10, 2019 (Visions du Réel)
- Running time: 82 minutes
- Country: Canada
- Language: English

L.A. Tea Time is a Canadian docufiction film, directed by Sophie Bédard Marcotte and released in 2019. A semi-fictionalized documentary, the film is a travelogue centering on Bédard Marcotte and cinematographer Isabelle Stachtchenko taking a road trip across the United States to Los Angeles, purportedly in the hopes of meeting and interviewing filmmaker and performance artist Miranda July.

== Production ==
The film was Bédard Marcotte's second, following Winter Claire (Claire l'hiver), in which she directly appeared on screen. Despite not considering herself an actress, she appeared in both films out of financial necessity, as a filmmaker working on a limited budget who could not afford to pay a professional actress.

According to Bédard Marcotte, she made the film because she is interested in stories of failure. It also draws parallels between her quest and the film The Wizard of Oz, using voice clips from past interviews with Belgian filmmaker Chantal Akerman as the metaphorical good witch.

== Distribution ==
The film premiered in April 2019 at the Visions du Réel film festival, and had its Canadian premiere at the 2019 Vancouver International Film Festival.

== Critical response ==
Pat Mullen of Point of View wrote that "Bédard-Marcotte and Stachtchenko evoke a Sofia Bohdanowicz/Deragh Campbell tag-team vibe as they explore new spaces between fiction and non-fiction. The persona of the Miranda July fangirl mostly serves as a surrogate for Bédard-Marcotte’s anxieties over making a career in filmmaking. The friends, both starving artists, struggle to realise their ambitions as creative types working on the outskirts of Montreal. (Bédard-Marcotte humorously explains to July in a letter that she earns her living by translating online hotel reviews.) Their search ultimately asks if and how a young woman who shares July’s artistic inclinations can enjoy a similar success in Montreal."

== Awards ==
The film was longlisted for the 2022 DGC Discovery Award.
