= Universal Language (2024 film) =

Canadian comedy-drama film

- Theatrical release poster
- French: Une langue universelle
- Persian: آواز بوقلمون
- Directed by: Matthew Rankin
- Written by: Ila Firouzabadi; Pirouz Nemati; Matthew Rankin
- Produced by: Sylvain Corbeil
- Starring: Rojina Esmaeili; Saba Vahedyousefi; Sobhan Javadi; Pirouz Nemati; Mani Soleymanlou; Danielle Fichaud
- Cinematography: Isabelle Stachtchenko
- Edited by: Xi Feng
- Music by: Amir Amiri; Christophe Lamarche-Ledoux
- Production company: Metafilms
- Distributed by: Maison 4:3
- Release dates: May 18, 2024 (Cannes); February 12, 2025 (United States)
- Running time: 89 minutes
- Country: Canada
- Languages: French; Persian
- Budget: <$3.5 million
- Box office: $768,297

Universal Language (French: Une langue universelle, Persian: آواز بوقلمون, romanized: Āvāz-e bughalamun, lit. 'The voice/song of a turkey') is a 2024 Canadian absurdist comedy-drama film, co-written and directed by Matthew Rankin.

It received positive reviews from critics and was named one of the top 5 international films of 2024 by the National Board of Review. The film was selected as the Canadian entry for Best International Feature Film at the 97th Academy Awards. It had a limited release on February 25, 2025, through Oscilloscope Laboratories.

== Plot ==
The film is set in an alternate reality in which Persian, rather than English, is the dominant language of Canada, although it remains in coexistence with French.

Described as a "surreal comedy of disorientation" set "somewhere between Tehran and Winnipeg", the film blends the initially unrelated, but gradually converging, stories of Negin (Rojina Esmaeili) and Nazgol (Saba Vahedyousefi), who find money frozen in ice and try to claim it; Massoud (Pirouz Nemati), a tour guide in Winnipeg who is leading a confused and disoriented tour group; and Matthew (Rankin), who quits his unfulfilling job with the government of Quebec and travels home to Winnipeg to visit his mother.

== Cast ==
- Rojina Esmaeili as Negin
- Saba Vahedyousefi as Nazgol
- Sobhan Javadi as Omid
- Pirouz Nemati as Massoud
- Mani Soleymanlou as Iraj Bilodeau
- Danielle Fichaud as Monsieur Castonguay
- Matthew Rankin as Matthew
- Denis Houle as Jean Suissûr
- Annie St-Pierre as Jeanne and Réjeanne Suissûr
- Asinnajaq as Knitter

== Release ==
The film had its world premiere in the Directors' Fortnight section of the 77th Cannes Film Festival on May 18, 2024, and had its North American premiere at the 49th Toronto International Film Festival.

It also screened as the opening film of the 2024 Festival du nouveau cinéma, in the Currents section of the 62nd New York Film Festival, and the MAMI Mumbai Film Festival 2024 under the World Cinema section, where it was screened together with An Urban Allegory by Alice Rohrwacher and JR.

It had a limited release in the United States on February 25, 2025, through Oscilloscope Laboratories.

Universal Language was selected as Canada's submission for the Academy Award for Best International Feature Film at the 97th Academy Awards. Rankin stated that it was the first film from Winnipeg to compete at the Academy Awards since La Salla in 1996. It made the shortlist of 15 films, but was not one of the five films selected as finalists.

== Reception ==
=== Critical response ===
On the review aggregator website Rotten Tomatoes, 98% of 46 critics' reviews are positive, with an average rating of 7.9/10. The website's consensus reads: "Bridging two nations with a clever and surreal conceit, Universal Language is a culture clash comedy brimming with wisdom." Metacritic, which uses a weighted average, assigned the film a score of 83 out of 100, based on 11 critics, indicating "universal acclaim".

Fionnuala Halligan of Screen Daily wrote: "Universal Language is doggedly eccentric, something that’s mirrored in its exaggerated aesthetic. There’s a pink cowboy-hatted singing turkey-shop worker; a man wandering around wearing a lit Christmas tree over his body; an absurdist bingo hall where men and women are interchangeable. Inside a pharmacy, all the labels are a generic Adam Stockhausen tribute — only they're beige. There’s also a 'Kleenex repository' and reference made to a 'Winnipeg Earmuff Authority'. Sad-eyed characters say things like: 'My son choked to death in a marshmallow-eating contest,' or 'she was flattened in a steamrolling accident'. You could call it whimsical. Absurdist. Contrived. Or an unexpectedly unusual concept album that doesn't quite come off but was worth the effort. And you would be correct every time."

Writing for IndieWire, David Ehrlich noted that the film "is first and foremost a testament to the shared artifice of all filmic storytelling, and to the singular realities it’s able to bring alive in turn."

In Vulture, Bilge Ebiri called the film the best he had seen at Cannes and "a magnificent film, one that feels warm and familiar even as we realize just how startlingly original it is."

The film was named to TIFF's annual Canada's Top Ten list for 2024.

=== Awards ===
Award	Date of ceremony	Category	Recipient(s)	Result	Ref(s)
Cannes Film Festival	2024	Audience Award, Director's Fortnight	Matthew Rankin	Won	
Melbourne International Film Festival	2024	Bright Horizons Award	Matthew Rankin	Won	
Toronto International Film Festival	2024	Best Canadian Discovery	Matthew Rankin	Won	
Vancouver International Film Festival	2024	Best Canadian Film	Matthew Rankin	Won	
Directors Guild of Canada	2024	Jean-Marc Vallée DGC Discovery Award	Matthew Rankin	Nominated	
National Board of Review	2024	Top Five International Films	Matthew Rankin	Honored	
Toronto Film Critics Association	2024	Rogers Best Canadian Film	Matthew Rankin	Won	
Canadian Screen Awards	2025	Best Motion Picture	Sylvain Corbeil	Nominated	
Canadian Screen Awards	2025	Best Direction	Matthew Rankin	Won	
Canadian Screen Awards	2025	Best Lead Performance in a Comedy Film	Rojina Esmaeili	Nominated	
Canadian Screen Awards	2025	Best Lead Performance in a Comedy Film	Pirouz Nemati	Nominated	
Canadian Screen Awards	2025	Best Supporting Performance in a Comedy Film	Danielle Fichaud	Nominated	
Canadian Screen Awards	2025	Best Supporting Performance in a Comedy Film	Mani Soleymanlou	Nominated	
Canadian Screen Awards	2025	Best Supporting Performance in a Comedy Film	Saba Vahedyousefi	Nominated	
Canadian Screen Awards	2025	Best Original Screenplay	Matthew Rankin, Pirouz Nemati, Ila Firouzabadi	Won	
Canadian Screen Awards	2025	Best Art Direction/Production Design	Louisa Schabas	Won	
Canadian Screen Awards	2025	Best Costume Design	Negar Nemati	Won	
Canadian Screen Awards	2025	Best Editing	Xi Feng	Won	
Canadian Screen Awards	2025	Best Makeup	Marie Salvado	Nominated	
Canadian Screen Awards	2025	Best Casting in a Film	Marilou Richer	Won	
8th Malaysia International Film Festival	2024	Best Cinematography	Isabelle Stachtchenko	Won	
Quebec Cinema Awards	2025	Best Film	Sylvain Corbeil	Won	
Quebec Cinema Awards	2025	Best Director	Matthew Rankin	Won	
Quebec Cinema Awards	2025	Best Supporting Actor	Mani Soleymanlou	Won	
Quebec Cinema Awards	2025	Best Supporting Actress	Danielle Fichaud	Won	
Quebec Cinema Awards	2025	Revelation of the Year	Pirouz Nemati	Nominated	
Quebec Cinema Awards	2025	Best Screenplay	Matthew Rankin, Ila Firouzabadi, Pirouz Nemati	Won	
Quebec Cinema Awards	2025	Best Art Direction	Louisa Schabas	Won	
Quebec Cinema Awards	2025	Best Costume Design	Negar Nemati	Nominated	
Quebec Cinema Awards	2025	Best Cinematography	Isabelle Stachtchenko	Nominated	
Quebec Cinema Awards	2025	Best Editing	Xi Feng	Nominated	
Quebec Cinema Awards	2025	Best Original Music	Amir Amiri, Christophe Lamarche-Ledoux	Nominated	
Quebec Cinema Awards	2025	Best Sound	Pablo Villegas, Sacha Ratcliffe, Bernard Gariépy Strobl	Nominated	
Quebec Cinema Awards	2025	Best Hairstyling	Nermin Grbic	Nominated	
Quebec Cinema Awards	2025	Best Makeup	Marie Salvado	Nominated	
Quebec Cinema Awards	2025	Best Visual Effects	Sam Javanrouh	Nominated	
Quebec Cinema Awards	2025	Best Casting	Marilou Richer	Won	
Quebec Cinema Awards	2025	Most Successful Film Outside Quebec	Sylvain Corbeil, Matthew Rankin, Ila Firouzabadi, Pirouz Nemati	Won	
Prix collégial du cinéma québécois	2026	Best Feature Film	Matthew Rankin	Nominated	
Association québécoise des critiques de cinéma	2026	Prix Luc-Perreault	Matthew Rankin	Won	

== See also ==
- List of submissions to the 97th Academy Awards for Best International Feature Film
- List of Canadian submissions for the Academy Award for Best International Feature Film

== Works cited ==
- Rankin, Matthew (2025). "Weird Life Events". Filmmaker. Vol. 33, no. 3. The Gotham Film & Media Institute.
