= Canadian Screen Award for Best Supporting Performance in a Comedy Film =

Canadian film award

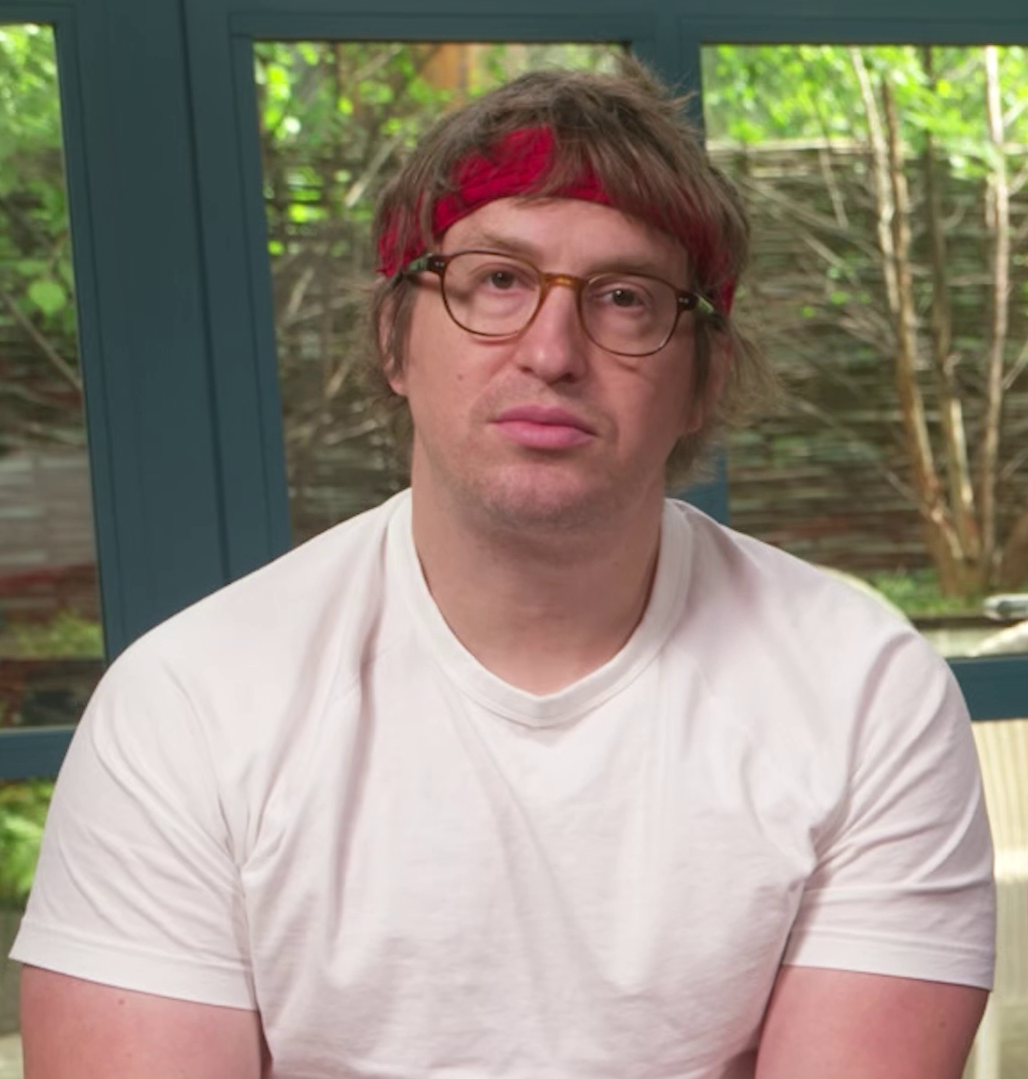
- 2025 winner: Matt Johnson
- Country: Canada
- Presented by: Academy of Canadian Cinema & Television
- First award: 2023
- Currently held by: Matt Johnson for Nirvanna the Band the Show the Movie (2025)
- Website: academy.ca/awards

The Canadian Screen Award for Best Supporting Performance in a Comedy Film is an annual award, presented by the Academy of Canadian Cinema and Television. It is done as part of the Canadian Screen Awards program, to honour the best supporting performance in a comedy film.

After the academy announced in August 2022 that it was discontinuing its former gendered awards for Best Supporting Actor and Best Supporting Actress, they presented only a single award for Best Supporting Performance in a Film at the 11th Canadian Screen Awards in 2023. The organization subsequently decided to increase the number of acting awards again, with the new awards separated by genre of film instead of performer gender; beginning with the 12th Canadian Screen Awards in 2024, distinct awards will now be presented for Best Supporting Performance in a Comedy Film and Best Supporting Performance in a Drama Film.

== 2020s ==
Year	Actor	Film	Ref
2023; 12th Canadian Screen Awards
2023; 12th Canadian Screen Awards	Glenn Howerton	BlackBerry	
2023; 12th Canadian Screen Awards	Hannah Cheesman	Hey, Viktor!	
2023; 12th Canadian Screen Awards	Charlie Gillespie	Suze	
2023; 12th Canadian Screen Awards	Matt Johnson	BlackBerry	
2023; 12th Canadian Screen Awards	Steve Laplante	Humanist Vampire Seeking Consenting Suicidal Person (Vampire humaniste cherche suicidaire consentant)	
2023; 12th Canadian Screen Awards	Marc-André Leclair	One Summer (Le temps d'un été)	
2023; 12th Canadian Screen Awards	Guy Nadon	One Summer (Le temps d'un été)	
2023; 12th Canadian Screen Awards	Noémie O'Farrell	Humanist Vampire Seeking Consenting Suicidal Person (Vampire humaniste cherche suicidaire consentant)	
2024; 13th Canadian Screen Awards
2024; 13th Canadian Screen Awards	Graham Greene	Seeds	
2024; 13th Canadian Screen Awards	Sandrine Bisson	1995	
2024; 13th Canadian Screen Awards	Roy Dupuis	Rumours	
2024; 13th Canadian Screen Awards	Danielle Fichaud	Universal Language (Une langue universelle)	
2024; 13th Canadian Screen Awards	Will Sasso	Deaner '89	
2024; 13th Canadian Screen Awards	Mani Soleymanlou	Universal Language (Une langue universelle)	
2024; 13th Canadian Screen Awards	Saba Vahedyousefi	Universal Language (Une langue universelle)	
2024; 13th Canadian Screen Awards	Mary Walsh	Deaner '89	
2025; 14th Canadian Screen Awards
2025; 14th Canadian Screen Awards	Matt Johnson	Nirvanna the Band the Show the Movie	
2025; 14th Canadian Screen Awards	Devon Bostick	Mile End Kicks	
2025; 14th Canadian Screen Awards	Catherine Chabot	Compulsive Liar 2 (Menteuse)	
2025; 14th Canadian Screen Awards	Juliette Gariépy	Two Women (Deux femmes en or)	
2025; 14th Canadian Screen Awards	Graham Greene	Sweet Summer Pow Wow	
2025; 14th Canadian Screen Awards	Agathe Ledoux	Follies (Folichonneries)	
2025; 14th Canadian Screen Awards	Hassan Mahbouba	Lovely Day (Mille secrets mille dangers)	
2025; 14th Canadian Screen Awards	Rose-Marie Perreault	Lovely Day (Mille secrets mille dangers)	
