= Canadian Screen Award for Best Lead Performance in a Comedy Film =

Annual Canadian film award

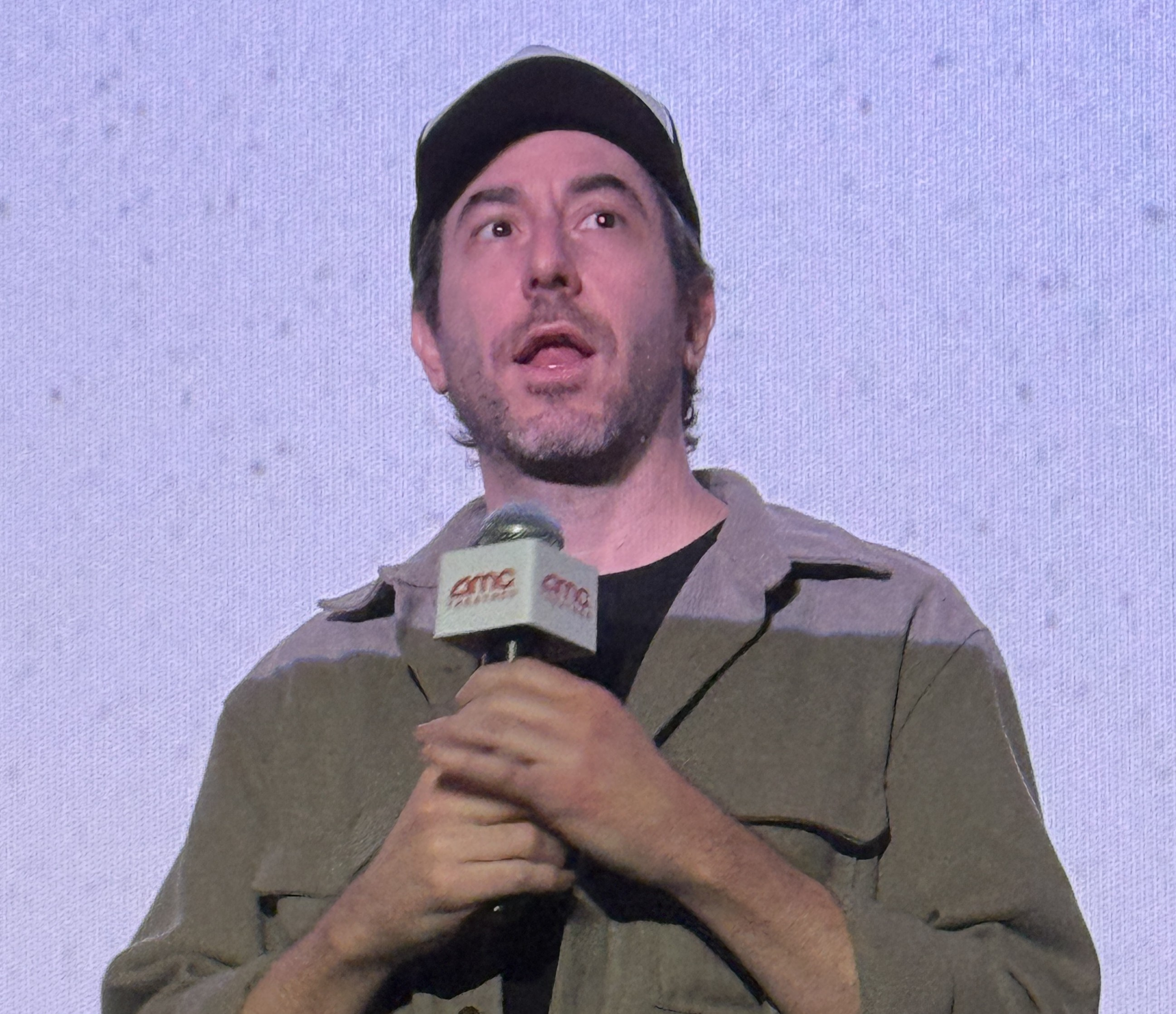
- 2025 winner: Jay McCarrol
- Country: Canada
- Presented by: Academy of Canadian Cinema & Television
- First award: 2023
- Currently held by: Jay McCarrol for Nirvanna the Band the Show the Movie (2025)
- Website: academy.ca/awards

The Canadian Screen Award for Best Performance in a Comedy Film is an annual award, presented by the Academy of Canadian Cinema and Television as part of the Canadian Screen Awards program, to honour the best leading performance in a comedy film.

After the academy announced in August 2022 that it was discontinuing its former gendered awards for Best Actor and Best Actress, they presented only a single award for Best Lead Performance in a Film at the 11th Canadian Screen Awards in 2023. The organization subsequently decided to increase the number of acting awards again, with the new awards separated by genre of film instead of performer gender; beginning with the 12th Canadian Screen Awards in 2024, distinct awards will now be presented for Best Lead Performance in a Comedy Film and Best Lead Performance in a Drama Film.

== 2020s ==
Year	Actor	Film	Ref
2023; 12th Canadian Screen Awards
2023; 12th Canadian Screen Awards	Jay Baruchel	BlackBerry	
2023; 12th Canadian Screen Awards	Félix-Antoine Bénard	Humanist Vampire Seeking Consenting Suicidal Person (Vampire humaniste cherche suicidaire consentant)	
2023; 12th Canadian Screen Awards	Alexandra Billings	Queen Tut	
2023; 12th Canadian Screen Awards	Susan Kent	Who's Yer Father?	
2023; 12th Canadian Screen Awards	Magalie Lépine-Blondeau	The Nature of Love (Simple comme Sylvain)	
2023; 12th Canadian Screen Awards	Cody Lightning	Hey, Viktor!	
2023; 12th Canadian Screen Awards	Chris Locke	Who's Yer Father?	
2023; 12th Canadian Screen Awards	Sara Montpetit	Humanist Vampire Seeking Consenting Suicidal Person (Vampire humaniste cherche suicidaire consentant)	
2024; 13th Canadian Screen Awards
2024; 13th Canadian Screen Awards	Cate Blanchett	Rumours	
2024; 13th Canadian Screen Awards	Rojina Esmaeili	Universal Language (Une langue universelle)	
2024; 13th Canadian Screen Awards	Kaniehtiio Horn	Seeds	
2024; 13th Canadian Screen Awards	Emily Lê	Paying for It	
2024; 13th Canadian Screen Awards	Pirouz Nemati	Universal Language (Une langue universelle)	
2024; 13th Canadian Screen Awards	Taylor Olson	Look at Me	
2024; 13th Canadian Screen Awards	Paul Spence	Deaner '89	
2024; 13th Canadian Screen Awards	Maïla Valentir	Ababooned (Ababouiné)	
2025; 14th Canadian Screen Awards
2025; 14th Canadian Screen Awards	Jay McCarrol	Nirvanna the Band the Show the Movie	
2025; 14th Canadian Screen Awards	Éric K. Boulianne	Follies (Folichonneries)	
2025; 14th Canadian Screen Awards	France Castel	The Furies (Les Furies)	
2025; 14th Canadian Screen Awards	Catherine Chabot	Follies (Folichonneries)	
2025; 14th Canadian Screen Awards	Neil Elias	Lovely Day (Mille secrets mille dangers)	
2025; 14th Canadian Screen Awards	Karine Gonthier-Hyndman	Two Women (Deux femmes en or)	
2025; 14th Canadian Screen Awards	Patrick Hivon	Peak Everything (Amour Apocalypse)	
2025; 14th Canadian Screen Awards	Laurence Leboeuf	Two Women (Deux femmes en or)	
