= Solitudes (film) =

2025 Canadian short film directed by Ryan McKenna

- Promotional poster
- Directed by: Ryan McKenna
- Written by: Ryan McKenna
- Produced by: Ryan McKenna
- Starring: Erin Margurite Carter; Pirouz Nemati
- Cinematography: Clark Ferguson
- Edited by: Ryan McKenna
- Music by: Tyler Fitzmaurice
- Production company: Pacific Avenue Films
- Distributed by: La Distributrice de films
- Release date: 12 August 2025 (Locarno)
- Running time: 38 minutes
- Country: Canada
- Language: French

Solitudes is a 2025 Canadian short drama film, written edited and directed by Ryan McKenna. This film starring Erin Margurite Carter and Pirouz Nemati is a hybrid film between documentary and fiction, which explores a budding friendship and interweaves family history and official history.

The film had its world premiere in the Concorso Corti d'Autore portion of the Pardi di Domani competition of the 78th Locarno Film Festival on 12 August 2025, where it was nominated for the Pardino d’Oro Swiss Life for the Best Auteur Short Film.

== Cast ==
- Erin Margurite Carter as Jocelyn Cormier
- Pirouz Nemati as Behrouz Farrokhzad

== Release ==
Solitudes had its World Premiere at the Concorso Corti d'Autore portion of the Pardi di Domani competition of the 78th Locarno Film Festival on 12 August 2025, and competed for the Pardino d’Oro Swiss Life for the Best Auteur Short Film.

The film also competed for Grand Prix in the National Competition 1 for Short Films at the 2025 Festival du nouveau cinéma in October 2025.

== Accolades ==
Award	Date of ceremony	Category	Recipient	Result	Ref.
Locarno Film Festival	16 August 2025	Pardino d’Oro Swiss Life for the Best Auteur Short Film	Solitudes	Nominated	
Festival du nouveau cinéma	19 October 2025	Grand Prix	Solitudes	Nominated	
Festival du nouveau cinéma	19 October 2025	Prix du public	Solitudes	Nominated	
