= Who by Fire (film) =

2024 Canadian-French film directed by Philippe Lesage

- Festival release poster
- French: Comme le feu
- Directed by: Philippe Lesage
- Written by: Philippe Lesage
- Produced by: Galilé Marion-Gauvin
- Starring: Noah Parker; Aurélia Arandi-Longpré
- Cinematography: Balthazar Lab
- Edited by: Mathieu Bouchard-Malo
- Production companies: Unité Centrale; Shellac Sud
- Distributed by: Be For Films
- Release date: 17 February 2024 (Berlinale)
- Running time: 161 minutes
- Countries: Canada; France
- Language: French

Who by Fire (French: Comme le feu) is a 2024 Canadian-French drama film written and directed by Philippe Lesage. The film, starring Noah Parker and Aurélia Arandi-Longpré, is about a film-loving teenager Jeff, who spends a vacation with his best friend Max's family in a remote log cabin.

It was selected in the Generation 14plus section at the 74th Berlin International Film Festival, where it had its world premiere on 17 February and won the Grand Prix of the International Jury of Generation.

== Synopsis ==
Jeff, a 17-year-old boy, joins his best friend Max's family for a visit to a large and secluded mansion in the forest of Blake Cadieux, a director he looks up to, and he has a secret crush on Alyocha, his friend's older sister, so he has high expectations for the trip. He feels strong emotions during this trip where he also observes the sometimes harmful power relations among a group of adults. Cadieux, whom Jeff thought of as a possible mentor, does not turn out to be the role model he had hoped for.

== Cast ==
- Noah Parker as Jeff
- Aurélia Arandi-Longpré as Aliocha
- Antoine Marchand Gagnon as Max
- Arieh Worthalter as Blake Cadieux
- Paul Ahmarani as Albert Gary
- Sophie Desmarais as Émilie
- Laurent Lucas as Eddy
- Irène Jacob as Hélène

== Production ==
The film was produced by Unité Centrale and Shellac Sud. Belgium's Be for Films has the international sales rights of the film.

Balthazar Lab did the photography and Mathieu Bouchard-Malo did the editing for the film.

== Release ==
Who by Fire had its World premiere on 17 February 2024, as part of the 74th Berlin International Film Festival, in Generation 14plus.

The film had its Canadian premiere on September 18 in the Features Canada program at the 2024 Cinéfest Sudbury International Film Festival in Sudbury, Ontario. It was also screened at the 2024 Vancouver International Film Festival on 3 October 2024. It also made it to Main Slate of 2024 New York Film Festival and was screened at the Lincoln Center in October 2024.

It went into commercial release on December 6, 2024.

== Reception ==
Andreas Köhnemann reviewing in Kino Zeit at Berlinale rated the film with three and half stars and appreciated the direction and cinematography stating, "Lesage and his cameraman Balthazar Lab skillfully capture the mixture of subliminal and abruptly emerging accusations and malice." Concluding Köhnemann wrote, "You don't need devils, slashers or death viruses to create the feeling of danger, emotions at the point of escalation are completely sufficient."

For The Hollywood Reporter, Jordan Mintzer praised Lesage as an underrated director whose films should be garnering a lot more attention and acclaim. He praised the film's cast for their performances and analyzed the reference to Leonard Cohen's song "Who by Fire" in the film's English-language title, writing that "it’s an apt description of the many baptisms the characters go through in the movie, battling the elements and one another. If certain adults barely make it out alive and all of them are unlikely, in any case, to change much, the kids emerge more mature from their experiences, licking their wounds and ready to face what comes next. They’re both the real victims in Who by Fire and the only ones who leave us with hope."

== Accolades ==
Award	Date	Category	Recipient	Result	Ref.
Berlin International Film Festival	25 February 2024	Grand Prize for Best Film	Philippe Lesage	Won	
Quebec Cinema Awards	December 7, 2025	Prix Iris for Best Film	Galilé Marion-Gauvin, Thomas Ordonneau	Nominated	
Quebec Cinema Awards	December 7, 2025	Prix Iris for Best Director	Philippe Lesage	Nominated	
Quebec Cinema Awards	December 7, 2025	Prix Iris for Best Actor	Paul Ahmarani	Nominated	
Quebec Cinema Awards	December 7, 2025	Prix Iris for Best Supporting Actress	Sophie Desmarais	Nominated	
Quebec Cinema Awards	December 7, 2025	Prix Iris for Revelation of the Year	Aurélia Arandi-Longpré	Nominated	
Quebec Cinema Awards	December 7, 2025	Prix Iris for Best Screenplay	Philippe Lesage	Nominated	
Quebec Cinema Awards	December 7, 2025	Prix Iris for Best Casting	Catherine Didelot and Maxime Giroux	Nominated	
