= The Last Meal (film) =

- French: Le Dernier repas
- Directed by: Maryse Legagneur
- Written by: Maryse Legagneur; Luis Molinié
- Produced by: Bernadette Payeur; François Bonneau
- Starring: Gilbert Laumord; Marie-Evelyne Lessard
- Cinematography: Mathieu Laverdière
- Edited by: Myriam Magassouba
- Music by: Jenny Salgado
- Production company: ACPAV
- Distributed by: Maison 4:3
- Release date: September 15, 2024 (FCVQ)
- Running time: 111 minutes
- Country: Canada
- Languages: French; Haitian Creole

The Last Meal (French: Le Dernier repas) is a Canadian drama film, directed by Maryse Legagneur and released in 2024. Inspired by a true story, the film stars Gilbert Laumord as Reynold Célestin, a Haitian man who suffered as a political prisoner under the Jean-Claude Duvalier regime in the 1970s. In the modern day he is dying of stomach cancer in Montreal, and attempts to reconnect with his estranged daughter Vanessa (Marie-Evelyne Lessard) over regular meals in his hospice room, sharing his recollections of the traumatic experiences that damaged both him and their familial relationship.

The cast also includes Fabrice Yvanoff Senate, Mireille Métellus, Jean Jean, Vincent D'Arbouze, Ralph Prosper, Natalie Tannous, Joseph Bellerose and Xiaodan He in supporting roles.

The film premiered on September 15, 2024, at the 2024 Quebec City Film Festival, before going into commercial release on September 27.

== Accolades ==
Award	Date	Category	Recipient	Result	Ref.
Quebec City Film Festival	2024	Grand Prix	Maryse Legagneur	Won	
Kingston Canadian Film Festival	2025	Best First Feature	Maryse Legagneur	Won	
Miami Film Festival	2025	Marimbas Award	Maryse Legagneur	Won	
Quebec Cinema Awards	2025	Best Cinematography	Mathieu Laverdière	Nominated	
Quebec Cinema Awards	2025	Best First Film	Maryse Legagneur	Nominated	
