= Jean-François Leblanc =

Canadian film director and screenplay writer

Jean-François Leblanc (born November 16, 1984) is a Canadian film director and screenwriter from Quebec, whose debut feature film Vile & Miserable (Vil & Misérable) premiered in 2024.

Born and raised in Lac-Saint-Charles, Quebec, he directed a number of short films prior to Vile & Miserable, including The Prince of Val-Bé (Le Prince de Val-Bé) in 2019, Landgraves in 2020, and Virga in 2023.

Vile & Miserable premiered in November 2024 at the Cinemania film festival, before going into commercial release in February 2025. The film received a Prix Iris nomination for Best First Film at the 27th Quebec Cinema Awards in 2025, and was shortlisted for the Prix collégial du cinéma québécois in 2026.
