= Rojina Esmaeili =

Canadian actress

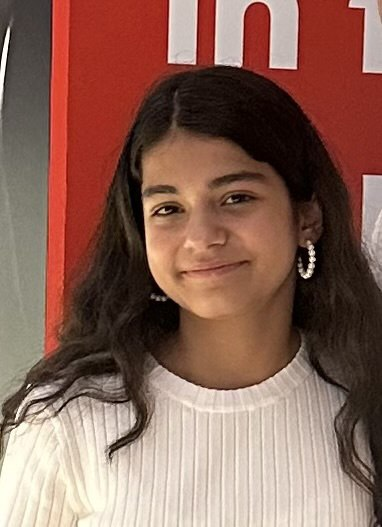
Rojina Esmaeili

Rojina Esmaeili is a Canadian actress, who had her debut performance as Negin in the 2024 film Universal Language.

She received a Canadian Screen Award nomination for Best Lead Performance in a Comedy Film at the 13th Canadian Screen Awards in 2025.
