= Gender Reveal (film) =

2024 Canadian short film directed by Mo Matton

- Directed by: Mo Matton
- Written by: Mo Matton
- Produced by: Léonie Hurtubise
- Starring: Ayo Tsalithaba; Ke Xin Li; Lyraël Alex Dauphin; Alexandre Bacon; Lauren Beatty
- Cinematography: Christophe Dalpé
- Edited by: Myriam Magassouba
- Music by: Samuel Gougoux
- Production company: Colonelle Films
- Distributed by: Travelling Distribution
- Release date: August 10, 2024 (Locarno)
- Running time: 12 minutes
- Country: Canada
- Language: English

Gender Reveal is a Canadian short comedy horror film, written and directed by Mo Matton and released in 2024. The film stars Ayo Tsalithaba as Rhys, a non-binary and polyamorous people pleaser who reluctantly brings their partners Ting (Ke Xin Li) and Mati (Lyraël Alex Dauphin) to the gender reveal party of their boss Marc (Alexandre Bacon) and his pregnant wife Chloe (Lauren Beatty), only to witness events at the party spiral horrifically out of control.

The film premiered in the Leopard of Tomorrow (Pardi di Domani) program at the 77th Locarno Film Festival, and had its Canadian premiere at the 2024 Toronto International Film Festival.

Later screenings included the 2024 Festival du nouveau cinéma, where it won the Public Prize as the most popular short film in the national short film competition.

== Awards ==
The film received a Canadian Screen Award nomination for Best Live Action Short Drama, and Tsalithaba was nominated for Best Performance in a Live Action Short Drama, at the 13th Canadian Screen Awards in 2025. It received two Quebec Cinema Award nominations at the 27th Quebec Cinema Awards, for Best Live Action Short Film and Most Successful Short Film Outside Quebec.
