= Peak Everything =

2025 Canadian romantic comedy film

- Theatrical release poster
- French: Amour Apocalypse
- Directed by: Anne Émond
- Written by: Anne Émond
- Produced by: Sylvain Corbeil
- Starring: Patrick Hivon; Piper Perabo; Connor Jessup
- Cinematography: Olivier Gossot
- Edited by: Anita Roth
- Music by: Christophe Lamarche-Ledoux
- Production company: Metafilms
- Distributed by: Immina Films
- Release dates: May 18, 2025 (Cannes); August 8, 2025 (Canada)
- Running time: 100 minutes
- Country: Canada
- Languages: English; French

Peak Everything (French: Amour Apocalypse) is a 2025 Canadian romantic comedy film written and directed by Anne Émond. Starring Patrick Hivon, Piper Perabo, Connor Jessup, Gord Rand, Eric K. Boulianne and Gilles Renaud.

The film had its world premiere in the Directors Fortnight section of the 2025 Cannes Film Festival on May 18, and was theatrically released in Canada by Immina Films on August 8, 2025.

== Plot ==
Adam is a kennel owner from Montreal who has depression and eco-anxiety. After buying a light therapy box to counter his symptoms, he falls in love with Tina, the customer service representative who helps him set up the device over the phone, and sets off to Sudbury to find her.

== Cast ==
- Patrick Hivon as Adam
- Piper Perabo as Tina
- Connor Jessup as Tom
- Gord Rand as Scott
- Eric K. Boulianne as Frank
- Gilles Renaud as Eugene
- Élizabeth Mageren
- Connor Jessup as Tom
- Leona Son as Rose
- Sienna Feghouli as Taylor
- Denis Houle as Denis
- Jean-Carl Boucher as Simon
- Benoît Mauffette as René
- Arlen Aguayo Stewart as Catalina
- Martin Dubreuil as M. Veilleux

== Production ==
The film went into production in 2024, with the working title Adam. Shooting was undertaken in Montreal, Quebec, and Sudbury, Ontario.

== Release ==
The film was also selected at the Cabourg Film Festival, where it won the Grand Prize. It also closed the 50th edition of the Toronto International Film Festival.

== Critical response ==
On the review aggregator website Rotten Tomatoes, 78% of 18 critics' reviews are positive, with an average rating of 7.2/10.

Nikki Baughan of Screen Daily wrote that "while the connection and chemistry between Adam and Tina is strong, and they are likeable as a pair, it’s never entirely believable. Emond initially plays with the ambiguity of the set-up – at some moments we wonder if Tina is an AI (a la Spike Jonze’s Her), at others it’s unclear whether she really exists – but soon settles into a love-against-the-odds adventure. Yet while we can understand why Adam has thrown caution to the wind in this search for some kind of happiness, Tina’s motivations are less clear. With a husband, two young children and a mundane job it is perhaps no surprise that Tina is looking for an escape but she also has a lot to lose – real-world ramifications which Emond’s script papers over with a very understanding (and possibly alcoholic) husband and lashings of joie de vivre".

== Awards ==
Award	Date of ceremony	Category	Recipient(s)	Result	Ref(s)
Quebec Cinema Awards	2025	Best Film	Sylvain Corbeil	Nominated	
Quebec Cinema Awards	2025	Best Director	Anne Émond	Nominated	
Quebec Cinema Awards	2025	Best Actor	Patrick Hivon	Won	
Quebec Cinema Awards	2025	Best Supporting Actor	Gilles Renaud	Nominated	
Quebec Cinema Awards	2025	Best Screenplay	Anne Émond	Nominated	
Quebec Cinema Awards	2025	Best Art Direction	Sylvain Lemaitre	Nominated	
Quebec Cinema Awards	2025	Best Costume Design	Patricia McNeil	Nominated	
Quebec Cinema Awards	2025	Best Cinematography	Olivier Gossot	Nominated	
Quebec Cinema Awards	2025	Best Editing	Anita Roth	Nominated	
Quebec Cinema Awards	2025	Best Original Music	Christophe Lamarche-Ledoux	Nominated	
Quebec Cinema Awards	2025	Best Sound	Sylvain Brassard, Stephen De Oliveira	Nominated	
Quebec Cinema Awards	2025	Best Hairstyling	Nermin Grbic	Nominated	
Quebec Cinema Awards	2025	Best Makeup	Marie Salvado	Nominated	
Quebec Cinema Awards	2025	Best Visual Effects	Olivier Masson	Won	
Quebec Cinema Awards	2025	Best Casting	Nathalie Boutrie, Hannah Antaki, Jon Comerford	Nominated	
Prix collégial du cinéma québécois	2026	Best Feature Film	Anne Émond	Nominated	
Association québécoise des critiques de cinéma	2026	Prix Luc-Perreault	Anne Émond	Nominated	
Rendez-vous Québec Cinéma	2026	Prix On tourne vert	Metafilms	Honored	
