= Noah Parker =

Canadian film and television actor

Noah Parker is a Canadian film and television actor. He is most noted for his leading roles in the youth drama series Six degrés, and the drama film Who by Fire (Comme le feu).

Born and raised in Montreal, Quebec, he grew up in a fluently bilingual household with a québécois mother and an immigrant father from New Zealand, and has appeared in both anglophone and francophone film and television productions. He had a regular role in the ensemble drama series 30 vies in the 2013-14 season, and had other supporting roles in film and television until being cast in a regular role in L'Échappée in 2018. He also appeared in the films Squat (Ailleurs), A Brother's Love (La femme de mon frère) and Goddess of the Fireflies (La déesse des mouches à feu).

Six degrés, which premiered in 2021, saw Parker starring as Léon Forest, a visually impaired teenager. For his performance in the series, he won two Gémeaux Awards for Best Actor in a Youth Series, in 2021 and 2022.

In 2022 he also portrayed Justin, a teen cancer patient, in the first season of Les bracelets rouges, the Quebec adaptation of The Red Band Society, but left the series due to a scheduling conflict and was replaced in the second season by Antoine L'Écuyer.

He starred in the 2024 film Who by Fire, for which he received a Canadian Screen Award nomination for Best Lead Performance in a Drama Film at the 14th Canadian Screen Awards in 2026.

He has also appeared in leading and supporting roles in the films Out Standing (Seule au front) and Lunar Sway.
