= Mani Soleymanlou =

Canadian actor and playwright

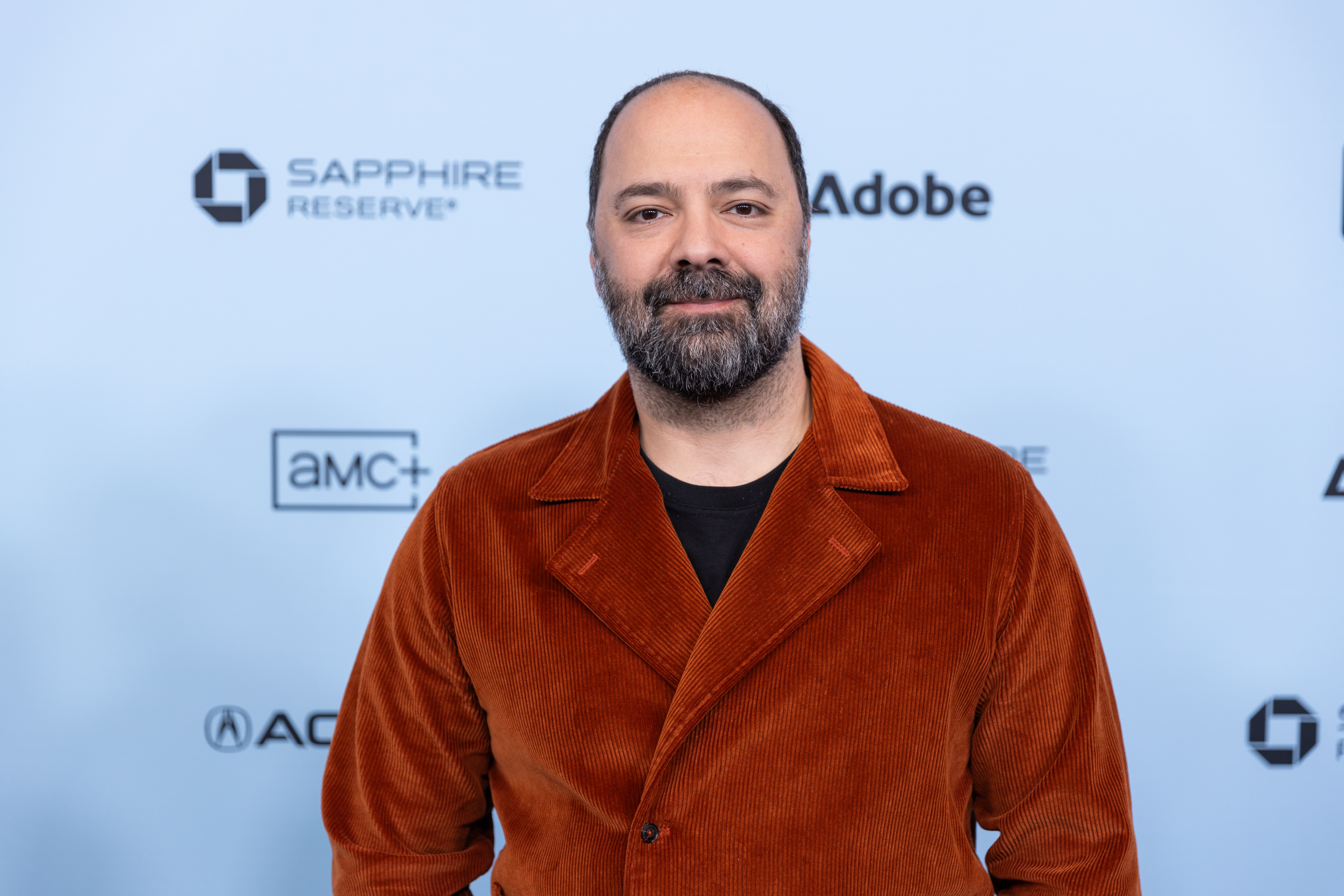

Mani Soleymanlou (born 1982) is a Canadian actor and playwright based in Montreal, Quebec. He is most noted for his regular role as police officer Robert "Coco" Bédard in the television series Happily Married (C'est comme ça que je t'aime), and his position as the current artistic director of the French theatre program at the National Arts Centre.

Born in Tehran, Iran, he moved with his family to France in childhood before they moved again to Toronto, Ontario, when he was nine. He was educated at the University of Ottawa and the National Theatre School of Canada, and founded his own Montreal-based theatre company, Orange Noyée, in 2011. He first became known for Un/One, Deux/Two and Trois/Three, a series of plays about immigrant identity; initially staged individually, he later presented a version which saw all three plays performed as a continuous trilogy, as well as the solo performance ZÉRO on related themes.

He was appointed artistic director of the NAC French theatre in 2020. In the same year he was one of the hosts of the 22nd Quebec Cinema Awards, which were presented as a webcast due to the COVID-19 pandemic.

== Filmography ==
=== Film ===
Year	Title	Role	Notes
2010	Gerry	Cameraman	
2011	Les Photos de Marie	Martin	
2011	Boucherie Halal	Hedi	
2013	The Little Queen (La petite reine)	Agent Wada	
2014	Nouvelles, nouvelles	Priest	
2014	Take Me (Prends-moi)	Mani	
2015	Rabid Dogs (Enragés)	Man in accident	
2015	Les brigands de l'hôtel bleu	Mike	
2018	Malek	Réza	
2018	For Those Who Don't Read Me (À tous ceux qui ne me lisent pas)	Martin	
2019	A Brother's Love (La Femme de mon frère)	Jasmin	
2023	The Skates (Les Patins)	Father	
2024	Universal Language (Une langue universelle)	Iraj Bilodeau	
2024	Miss Boots (Mlle Bottine)	Paul	
2025	Two Women (Deux Femmes en or)		

=== Television ===
Year	Title	Role	Notes
2009	Les hauts et les bas de Sophie Paquin	Policeman	
2010	Les Rescapés	Fabrice	
2015–2018	Marche à l'ombre	Ahmed Fhougali	
2016	Connexion en cours	Mani	
2016–2020	Madame Lebrun	Père Fabien	
2016	O'	Dr. Nazem	
2017	En famille	Karim	
2018	Hubert et Fanny	Yaniss	
2018	Lâcher prise	Hakim	
2019	La Faille	Dave Bélanger	
2020–2022	Happily Married (C'est comme ça que je t'aime)	Robert « Coco » Bédard	
2020	Can You Hear Me? (M'entends-tu?)	Frank	
2020	Épidémie	Dr. Quentin Buis	
2021	Survivre à ses enfants	Kamyar	
2021	Virage	Tristan	
2023	Avant le crash	Patrick	
2024	In Memoriam	Victor	

== Theatre ==
Year	Title	Notes
2012	Un/One	
2013	Deux/Two	
2014	Trois/Three	
2015	Ils étaient quatre	
2015	Cinq à sept	
2016	Les lettres arabes 2	
2017	Huit	
2017	Le Wild West Show de Gabriel Dumont	
2018	Neuf (titre provisoire)	
2018	Dix	
2019	Zéro	
2021	2042	
2022	Un. Deux. Trois.	

== Awards ==
Award	Date of ceremony	Category	Work	Result	Ref(s)
Canadian Screen Awards	2025	Best Supporting Performance in a Comedy Film	Universal Language	Nominated	
Quebec Cinema Awards	2025	Best Supporting Actor	Universal Language	Won	
