= Squat (film) =

2017 film directed by Samuel Matteau

- Directed by: Samuel Matteau
- Written by: Guillaume Fournier; Jacques Laberge; Paul Rousseau
- Release date: September 16, 2017 (Quebec City Film Festival)
- Running time: 98 minutes
- Country: Canada
- Language: French

Squat (french: Ailleurs) is a 2017 drama film directed by Samuel Matteau, in his directorial debut. It had premiere at the Quebec City Film Festival 2017.

== Premise ==
After a criminal attack, Thierry and his friend Samu decide to flee the suburbs towards downtown Quebec.

== Cast ==
- Noah Parker - Thierry Vezina
- Théodore Pellerin - Samu
- Serge Bonin
- Antoine DesRochers
- Mathieu Drouin
- Clémence Dufresne-Deslières
- Robert Lepage
- Christian Michaud
- Nahéma Ricci
- Claude Robinson - Bouchard
- Emmanuel Schwartz - Duc
- Gabriel Cloutier Tremblay

== Production ==
It was initially going to be released in September 2016, but was delayed for the addition of visual effects.

== Reception ==
In his review in Le Soleil, Éric Moreault said that the film has "a lack of breath and intensity (...) A great first attempt that suggests good things, as long as Samuel Matteau has the means to realize his ambitions." In Films du Québec, Charles-Henri Ramond said that "several characters are poorly defined, but the overall intensity is very real."
