= Sam McGlynn =

Irish-Canadian film director

Sam McGlynn is an Irish-Canadian film director. He is most noted for his debut feature film Deaner '89, for which he received a nomination for the John Dunning Best First Feature Award at the 13th Canadian Screen Awards in 2025.

McGlynn began his career working in editing and post-production in Ireland before moving to North America, where he worked in video game development for Electronic Arts, and in game and visual effects work for Method Studios. He has also directed the short horror films Creep Night, Dickproof and Dickproof 2.
