= Titina (film) =

2022 animated film

- Directed by: Kajsa Næss
- Written by: Per Schreiner; Kajsa Næss
- Produced by: Tonje Skar Reiersen; Lise Fearnley; Viviane Vanfleteren
- Starring: Jan Gunnar Røise; Kåre Conradi; Anne Marit Jacobsen; Thorbjørn Harr; Ingar Helge Gimle; John Brungot; Christian Skolmen; Silje Torp
- Edited by: Jens Christian Fodstad; Zaklina Stojcevska; Anders Bergland
- Music by: Kåre Vestrheim
- Production companies: Mikrofilm; Vivi Film
- Distributed by: Norsk Filmdistribusjon (Norway); Lumière (Belgium)
- Release dates: 21 October 2022 (Norway); 29 March 2023 (Belgium)
- Running time: 91 minutes
- Countries: Norway; Belgium
- Languages: Norwegian (original); English

Titina is a 2022 Norwegian-Belgian animated feature directed by Kajsa Næss. The film was produced by Mikrofilm producers Tonje Skar Reiersen and Lise Fearnley, in co-production with Viviane Vanfleteren from Vivi Film. Titina was written by Per Schreiner and director Kajsa Næss. The music is by Norwegian composer Kåre Vestrheim. Titina had its Norwegian theatrical release on October 21, 2022.

Titina is loosely inspired by real events and deals with Norwegian explorer Roald Amundsen and Italian engineer Umberto Nobile's 1926 journey over the North Pole, on the airship "Norge". The main character, Titina, is Umberto Nobile's dog, a terrier. The film also contains documentaries footage and stills from the 1920s.

== Plot ==
Italian airship engineer Umberto Nobile enjoys a quiet life with his beloved dog Titina, whom he rescued from the streets of Rome. One day, Nobile is contacted by the Norwegian explorer Roald Amundsen, who wants to order an airship to conquer the North Pole. Nobile is quickly taken with the idea, so Amundsen, Nobile and Titina embark on an expedition to the last undiscovered place on Earth. Their quest is successful but, in the aftermath, the two men start to quarrel over the glory.

== Cast ==
- Jan Gunnar Røise as Umberto Nobile
- Kåre Conradi as Roald Amundsen
- Anne Marit Jacobsen as Amundsens maid, Betty
- John Brungot as Benito Mussolini
- Thorbjørn Harr as Italo Balbo
- Ingar Helge Gimle as Natale Cecioni
- Christian Skolmen as Attilio Caratti
- Nader Khademi as Filippo Zappi
- Roy Fenstad as Felice Trojani
- Håkon Ramstad as Oscar Wisting
- Ninni Spone as Maria Nobile
- Siri Forberg as Carlotta Nobile
- Silje Torp as Telegrafist

== Technique ==
Titina is crafted as a traditional animated film, meaning that each frame of the film is drawn by hand. The film is made up of roughly 94.000 hand drawn images, and consists of 4380 seconds of animation. The animation process goes through four stages: rough animation, clean up animation, 'in-betweening' and colouring, and on average it takes two days to complete one second of animation. The 2D animation in Titina was drawn digitally, using Toon Boom Harmony. The film also incorporates documentary images of real life expeditions that took place in 1926 and 1928. The majority of these clips are taken from the 90 minute documentary "The Airship Norge's Flight Across the Arctic Ocean" (1926).

== Reception ==
Titina received critical acclaim internationally. French newspaper Le Figaro states that the film has "crazy charm", Swedish Dagens Nyheter called it "a colourful sensation", while the British animation magazine Skwigly wrote that "Titina is a seemingly simple yet impressive achievement". In Norway, Titina became the most critically acclaimed family film since Pinchcliffe Grand Prix (1975).

The film was nominated for the 2023 Amanda Award in the categories Best Children's Film and Best Original Music.

== Awards and nominations ==
Award	Category	Nominee/Winner	Result
Cartoon Movie 2023	Producer of the Year	Tonje Skar Reiersen, Lise Fearnley and Viviane Vanfleteren	Nominated
Tokyo Anime Award Festival 2023	Award of Excellence	—N/a	Won
Zlín Film Festival 2023	Children's Jury Grand Prize	—N/a	Won
Zlín Film Festival 2023	Karel Zeman Award	—N/a	Won
Amanda Awards 2023	Best Children's Film	—N/a	Nominated
Amanda Awards 2023	Best Original Score	Kåre Christoffer Vestrheim	Nominated
