= You Will Be Free =

2026 Canadian drama film

- French: Ma fille tu seras libre
- Directed by: Bachir Bensaddek
- Written by: Marie Vien
- Produced by: Valérie d'Auteuil
- Starring: Wazhma Bahar; Saba Vahedyousefi
- Cinematography: Claudine Sauvé
- Edited by: Richard Comeau; Yvann Thibaudeau
- Music by: Catherine Major
- Production company: Caramel Films
- Distributed by: Entract Films; Les Films Opale
- Release date: March 27, 2026
- Running time: 89 minutes
- Country: Canada
- Languages: French; Dari

You Will Be Free (French: Ma fille tu seras libre) is a Canadian drama film, directed by Bachir Bensaddek and released in 2026. The film stars Wazhma Bahar as Zarmina Latif, a woman returning to her native Afghanistan for the first time since moving to Montreal 15 years earlier to escape an unwanted arranged marriage, where she discovers that her family secured her safe passage to Canada by pledging her daughter Marwa (Saba Vahedyousefi) in another arranged marriage to the nephew of the man who helped her escape.

The cast also includes Julie Le Breton, Firuz Ali Nazar, Arezoo Ariapoor, Saboor Sahak, Paeman Arianfar, Guillaume Cyr and Sophie Cadieux in supporting roles.

== Production ==
The film was shot in 2025 in both Quebec and Cyprus.

== Distribution ==
The film premiered on March 27, 2026.

It will screen at the 2026 Windsor International Film Festival, in competition for the WIFF Prize in Canadian Film.
