= Vile & Miserable =

- French: Vil & Misérable
- Directed by: Jean-François Leblanc
- Written by: Jean-François Leblanc; Samuel Cantin
- Based on: Vil & Misérable by Samuel Cantin
- Produced by: Fanny Drew; Sarah Mannering
- Starring: Fabien Cloutier; Pier-Luc Funk; Chantal Fontaine; Alexis Martin
- Cinematography: François Messier-Rheault
- Edited by: Jules Saulnier
- Music by: Mathieu David Gagnon
- Production company: Colonelle Films
- Distributed by: Entract
- Release date: November 13, 2024 (Cinemania)
- Running time: 114 minutes
- Country: Canada
- Language: French

Vile & Miserable (French: Vil & Misérable) is a Canadian fantasy comedy film, directed by Jean-François Leblanc and released in 2024.

An adaptation of the graphic novel by Samuel Cantin, the film stars Fabien Cloutier as Lucien Vil, a misanthropic demon who has been living on earth for 350 years running a used bookstore inside a car dealership; one day, dealership owner Sylvie (Chantal Fontaine) hires Daniel Lamontagne (Pier-Luc Funk) as a new assistant for Lucien against his wishes, with the two developing an unlikely friendship as they set out to recover a shipment of rare books stolen by the Mafia from a shipping container at the Port of Montreal.

The cast also includes Anne-Élisabeth Bossé, Alexis Martin, Éric Robidoux, Rodley Pitt, Florence Blain Mbaye, Sébastien Leblanc, Bernard Fortin, Anne Boulianne, Guillaume Girard, Robert Ung and Justin Leyrolles-Bouchard in supporting roles.

== Distribution ==
The film premiered on November 13, 2024, at the Cinemania film festival, before going into commercial release in February 2025.

== Accolades ==
Award	Date	Category	Recipient	Result	Ref.
Quebec Cinema Awards	2025	Best Supporting Actor	Alexis Martin	Nominated	
Quebec Cinema Awards	2025	Best Supporting Actress	Chantal Fontaine	Nominated	
Quebec Cinema Awards	2025	Best Art Direction	Ludovic Dufresne	Nominated	
Quebec Cinema Awards	2025	Best Costume Design	Gabrielle Lauzier	Won	
Quebec Cinema Awards	2025	Best Sound	Jean-Sébastien Beaudoin-Gagnon, Simon Gervais, Bernard Gariépy Strobl	Nominated	
Quebec Cinema Awards	2025	Best Hairstyling	Jonathan Paulin	Nominated	
Quebec Cinema Awards	2025	Best Makeup	Léonie Lévesque-Robert, Bruno Gatien, Stefan Ashdown, Caroline Aquin	Won	
Quebec Cinema Awards	2025	Best Visual Effects	Marc Hall, David Atexide	Nominated	
Quebec Cinema Awards	2025	Best First Film	Jean-François Leblanc, Samuel Cantin	Won	
Prix collégial du cinéma québécois	2026	Best Feature Film	Jean-François Leblanc	Nominated	
