= Ayo Tsalithaba =

Canadian artist and filmmaker

Ayo Tsalithaba is a Canadian multimedia artist and filmmaker based in Toronto, Ontario. They are most noted for their performance in the short film Gender Reveal, for which they received a Canadian Screen Award nomination for Best Performance in a Live Action Short Drama at the 13th Canadian Screen Awards in 2025.

As an artist, they work principally in film and video, as well as some work in photography, illustration and graphic design. Their work has included music videos for artists such as Bernice, Tika Simone, Queer Songbook Orchestra, Myst Milano and DijahSB, as well as short narrative and documentary films and videos. In 2023, Tsalithaba and Pat Mills co-directed a Heritage Minute about American-Canadian singer Jackie Shane.
