= Sophie Bédard Marcotte =

Canadian film director

Sophie Bédard Marcotte is a Canadian film director from Montreal, Quebec, whose films explore the boundaries between documentary and fiction storytelling.

She had a number of sound credits on films before releasing her debut documentary film, I've Gone Backwards or Something (J'ai comme reculé, on dirait), in 2017.

Her second feature but first narrative fiction film, Winter Claire (Claire l'hiver), premiered at the 2017 Festival du nouveau cinéma before going into commercial release in 2018, and was shortlisted for the Prix collégial du cinéma québécois in 2019. Despite not considering herself an actress, she appeared in the film as its lead character, as she felt that could not afford to pay a professional actress.

She followed up in 2019 with L.A. Tea Time, a semi-fictionalized documentary about her own road trip across the United States with friend and colleague Isabelle Stachtchenko. The film was longlisted for the 2019 DGC Discovery Award.

In 2025 she released I Lost Sight of the Landscape (J'ai perdu de vue le paysage), a film about the development of her relationship with playwright Gabriel Charlebois Plante.
