= Saba Vahedyousefi =

Canadian actress

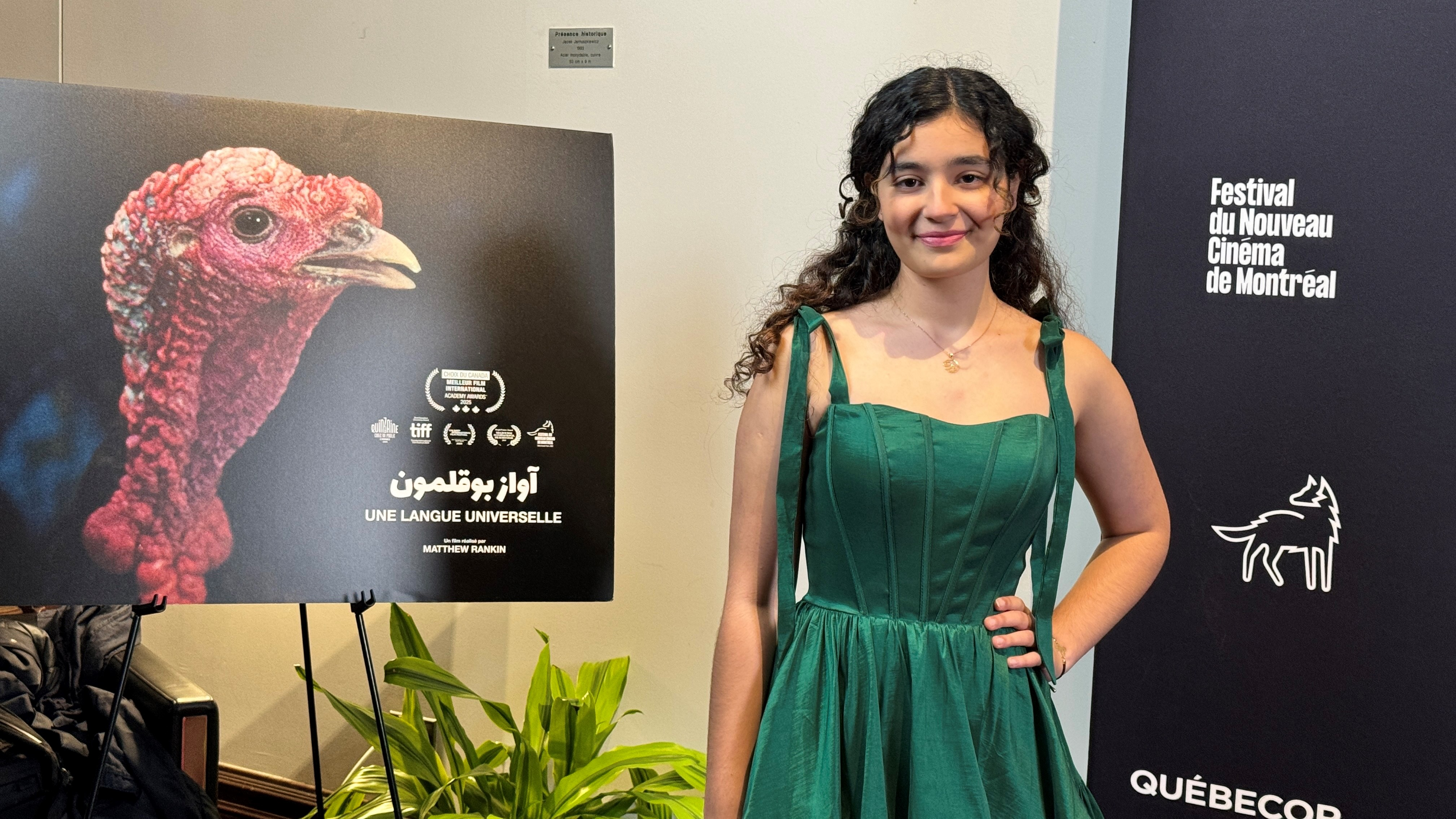
Saba Vahedyousefi

Saba Vahedyousefi is a Canadian actress, who had her debut performance as Nazgol in the 2024 film Universal Language.

She received a Canadian Screen Award nomination for Best Supporting Performance in a Comedy Film at the 13th Canadian Screen Awards in 2025.

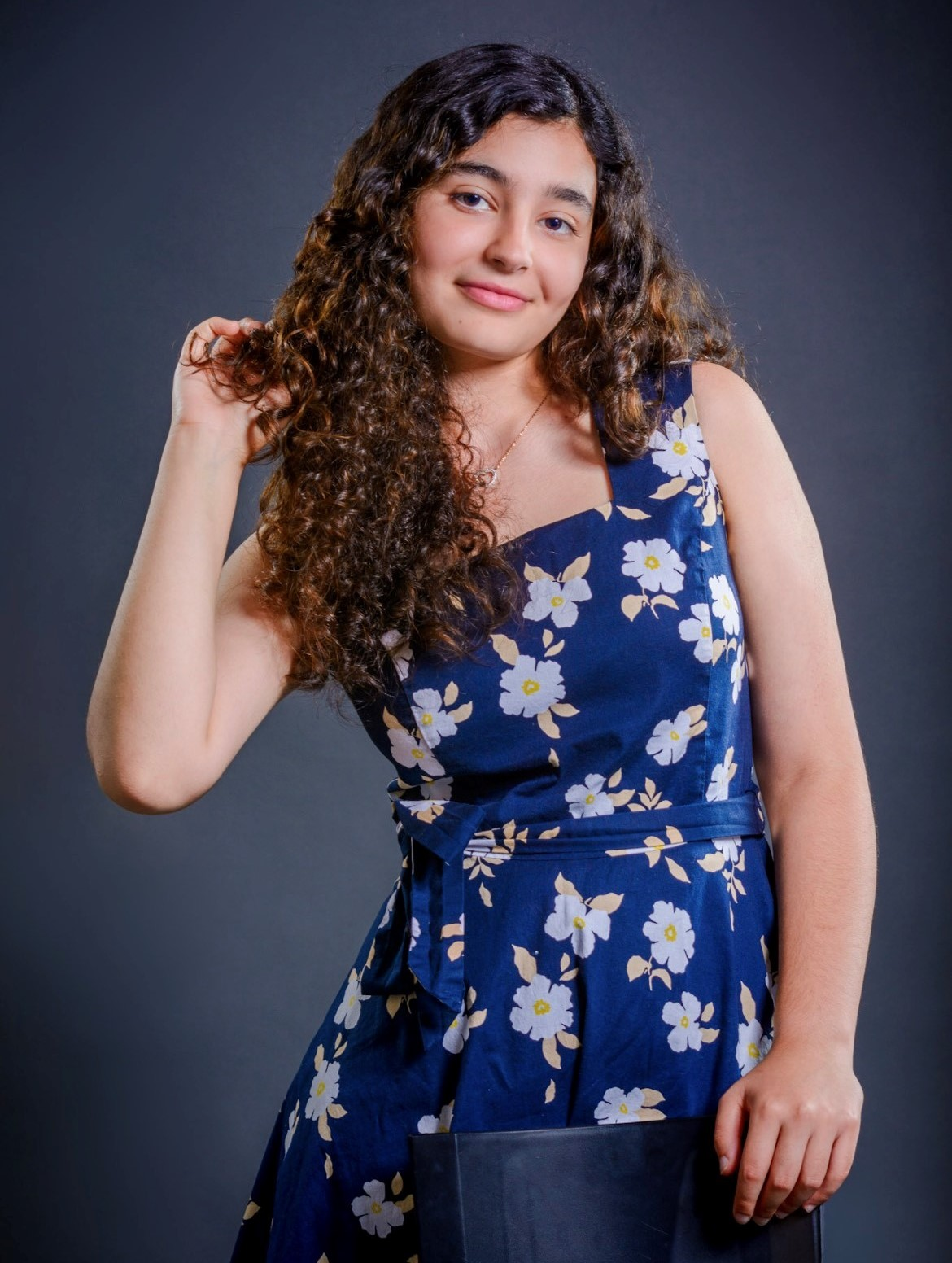
Saba Vahedyousefi

She has also been a contributor of informational videos to CBC Kids, and has been a children's television performer on multicultural channel CFHD-DT. In 2026 she appeared as Marwa in the film You Will Be Free (Ma fille tu seras libre).
