= Deaner '89 =

2024 film

- Film poster
- Directed by: Sam McGlynn
- Written by: Paul Spence
- Produced by: Kyle Irving; Paul Spence
- Starring: Paul Spence; Star Slade; Will Sasso; Stephen McHattie; Mary Walsh
- Cinematography: Samy Inayeh
- Edited by: Reginald Harkema
- Music by: Justin Delorme; Paul Spence
- Production company: Eagle Vision
- Distributed by: Mongrel Media
- Release date: September 6, 2024
- Running time: 90 minutes
- Country: Canada
- Language: English

Deaner '89 is a 2024 Canadian action comedy film directed by Sam McGlynn. It stars Paul Spence, Star Slade, Will Sasso, and Mary Walsh. Spence plays Dean Murdoch, a metalhead character from the FUBAR series.

The film was released in theaters on September 6, 2024.

Despite the Murdoch character having previously appeared in the FUBAR films, the film is not considered a FUBAR sequel, but a standalone film.

== Plot ==
In 1989, Murdoch and his sister first become interested in heavy metal music, soon after learning that their adoptive parents have hidden from them that they are Indigenous. Dean is Métis and his sister is Blackfoot. They go on a trip to Calgary to see a band.

== Cast ==
- Paul Spence as Dean
- Star Slade as Jen
- Will Sasso as Glen
- Stephen McHattie as Dack
- Mary Walsh as May
- Kevin McDonald as Principal Gil
- Maddy Foley as Kitty

== Inspiration ==
The film's content related to Indigenous identity was partly inspired by Spence's own family history. His father was adopted into a non-Indigenous family in Prince Albert, Saskatchewan and only learned as an adult that his parents were Métis (and that his ancestor, Scottish-Métis leader Andrew Spence, had been part of the North-West Resistance). According to Spence, "It seemed like such a natural fit to take some of my father's stories, as well as my own, to create something fun and funny, but that also had some heart and authenticity — where audiences will laugh their asses off, but also learn something about Canada's complicated history."

== Reception ==
Thom Ernst of Original Cin gave the film a B− and wrote, "The comedy here doesn't pull punches — big gags, big cameos, big laughs. Not all of it works, but when it does, it works beautifully."

Andrew Parker of TheGATE.ca gave the film a score of 3 out of 10, writing, "Unassured, scattered, and trying too hard to relive past glories while simultaneously failing to make viewers forget about everything that came before, Deaner '89 is a messy vanity project that never settles on a satisfying hook on which to hang all of its tired jokes about metal heads, hosers, and givin'r."

Richard Crouse was more positive, awarding the film 3.5/5 stars, asserting that Spence "weaves humor into every scene, but never settles for the easy joke."

=== Awards ===
Award	Date of ceremony	Category	Recipient(s)	Result	Ref.
Canadian Screen Awards	2025	Best Lead Performance in a Comedy Film	Paul Spence	Nominated	
Canadian Screen Awards	2025	Best Supporting Performance in a Comedy Film	Will Sasso	Nominated	
Canadian Screen Awards	2025	Best Supporting Performance in a Comedy Film	Mary Walsh	Nominated	
Canadian Screen Awards	2025	John Dunning Best First Feature	Sam McGlynn	Nominated	
Canadian Screen Awards	2025	Best Original Song	Paul Spence, Michael Phillip Heppner, Ian Kerr Wilson, Guillaume Marc Antoine Tremblay, Stan Pietrusik "The Power of the Tribe"	Nominated	
Canadian Screen Awards	2025	Best Makeup	Doug Morrow	Nominated	
Canadian Screen Awards	2025	Best Stunt Coordination	Sean Skene, Rick Skene	Nominated	
