= Chantal Fontaine =

Canadian film and television actress

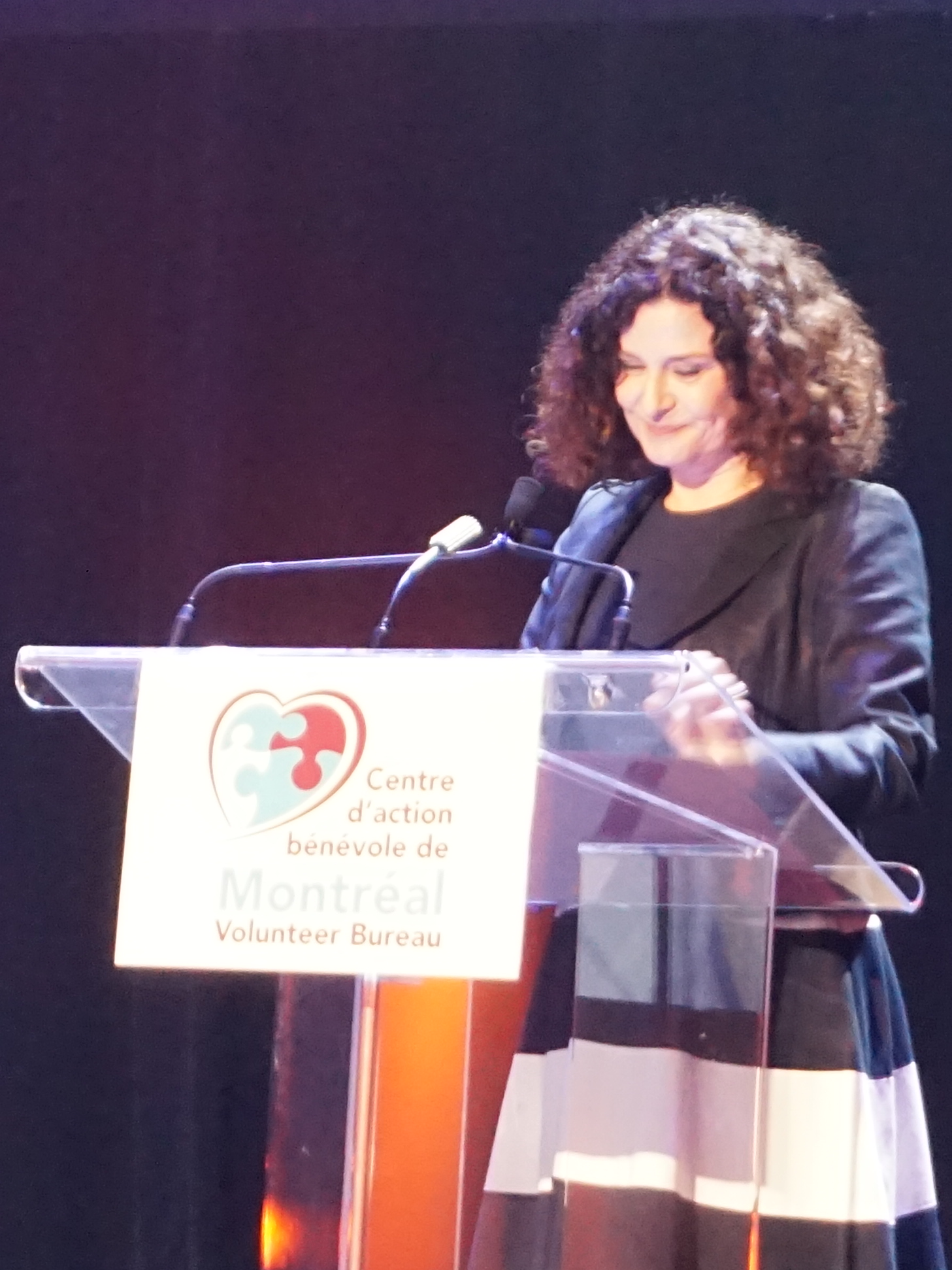
- Born: October 11, 1965 (age 60); Saint-Hyacinthe, Quebec, Canada
- Occupation: Actress
- Years active: 1990s–present

Chantal Fontaine (born October 11, 1965) is a Canadian actress from Quebec, best known for her starring television roles as Virginie Boivin in Virginie and Julie Davignon in Yamaska.

In 2025 she received a Quebec Cinema Award nomination for Best Supporting Actress at the 27th Quebec Cinema Awards, for her performance in Vile & Miserable (Vil & Misérable).
