= Aurélia Arandi-Longpré =

Canadian actress (born 2002)

- Born: 2002 (age 23–24); Rivière-des-Prairies, Montreal, Quebec, Canada
- Occupation: Actress
- Years active: 2019–present
- Known for: Who by Fire

Aurélia Arandi-Longpré (born 2002) is a Canadian actress from Montreal, Quebec. She is most noted for her performance in the 2024 film Who by Fire (Comme le feu), for which she received a Prix Iris nomination for Revelation of the Year at the 27th Quebec Cinema Awards in 2025.

== Early life and education ==
Arandi-Longpré grew up in the Rivière-des-Prairies district of Montreal. She began performing as a child and, by 2021, had built up roughly a decade of credits in commercials, web series, theatre and television. She studied social work at Cégep Marie-Victorin.

== Career ==
Arandi-Longpré worked steadily in Quebec television, including the youth series Les Mutants, in which she played Lila. For that role she was a finalist for Best Lead Actress: Youth (Meilleur premier rôle féminin : jeunesse) at the 36th Prix Gémeaux in 2021; the award went to Amaryllis Tremblay. She also appeared as Simone in the series Après.

In 2024 she played Aliocha, one of the lead roles, in Philippe Lesage's feature film Who by Fire (Comme le feu). Her performance earned her a Prix Iris nomination for Revelation of the Year at the 27th Quebec Cinema Awards in 2025, and a Canadian Screen Award nomination for Best Supporting Performance in a Drama Film at the 14th Canadian Screen Awards in 2026.

== Filmography ==
=== Film ===
Year	Title	Role
2024	Who by Fire (Comme le feu)	Aliocha

=== Television ===
Year	Title	Role
2019–2021	Les Mutants	Lila
2022	Après	Simone
