= Rojek (film) =

- Theatrical release poster
- Directed by: Zaynê Akyol
- Written by: Zaynê Akyol
- Produced by: Zaynê Akyol; Sylvain Corbeil; Audrey-Ann Dupuis-Pierre
- Cinematography: Arshia Shakiba; Nicolas Canniccioni
- Edited by: Mathieu Bouchard-Malo
- Music by: Roger Tellier-Craig
- Production company: Metafilms
- Distributed by: Maison 4:3
- Release date: April 13, 2022 (Visions du Réel)
- Running time: 128 minutes
- Country: Canada
- Languages: Kurdish; English; Arabic; French; German

Rojek is a 2022 Canadian documentary film written, directed and produced by Zaynê Akyol. It is about the recovery of Kurdistan from the Rojava–Islamist conflict with a special emphasis on interviews with imprisoned former members of the Islamic State about their motivations. It was selected as the Canadian entry for the Best International Feature Film at the 96th Academy Awards.

== Release ==
The film premiered on April 13, 2022 at the Visions du Réel film festival in Switzerland. It had its Canadian premiere at the 2022 Hot Docs Canadian International Documentary Festival.

== Reception ==
=== Critical response ===
Rojek has an approval rating of 100% on review aggregator website Rotten Tomatoes, based on 5 reviews, and an average rating of 7.8/10.

=== Awards ===
At Hot Docs, the film won a Special Jury Prize from the Best Canadian Feature Documentary jury.

It was a Prix Iris nominee for Best Documentary Film at the 25th Quebec Cinema Awards in 2023. It also received nominations for Best Cinematography in a Documentary (Nicolas Canniccioni, Arshia Shakiba) and Best Editing in a Documentary (Mathieu Bouchard-Malo).

The film was shortlisted for the Rogers Best Canadian Documentary Award at the Toronto Film Critics Association Awards 2023.

== See also ==
- List of submissions to the 96th Academy Awards for Best International Feature Film
- List of Canadian submissions for the Academy Award for Best International Feature Film
