= Marguerite Laurence =

Canadian child actress

- Born: March 11, 2013 (age 12); Quebec, Canada
- Occupation: Actress
- Years active: 2016–present
- Parent(s): Stéphanie Lapointe; Dominique Laurence

Marguerite Laurence (born March 11, 2013) is a Canadian child actress from Quebec. She is most noted for her debut performance in the 2024 film Miss Boots (Mlle Bottine), for which she received dual Quebec Cinema Award nominations for Best Actress and Revelation of the Year at the 27th Quebec Cinema Awards in 2025.

She is the daughter of pop singer Stéphanie Lapointe and music video director Dominique Laurence.

She appeared as a child in the 2016 short film Oh What a Wonderful Feeling, and as a young dancer in a 2018 music video directed by her father for Mélisande (électrotrad), prior to making her feature film debut in Miss Boots. She subsequently appeared in the 2025 film Anna Kiri, as the title character in childhood flashbacks.
