= Gulîstan, Land of Roses =

2016 documentary film by Zayne Akyol

- Directed by: Zaynê Akyol
- Written by: Zaynê Akyol
- Produced by: Sarah Mannering; Fanny Drew; Yanick Létourneau; Mehmet Aktas; Nathalie Cloutier; Denis McCready
- Cinematography: Étienne Roussy
- Edited by: Mathieu Bouchard-Malo
- Music by: Christophe Lamarche-Ledoux
- Production companies: Périphéria Productions; MitosFilm; NFB
- Release date: 2016
- Running time: 1:26:00
- Country: Canada

Gulîstan, Land of Roses (French title: Gulîstan, terre de roses) is a 2016 feature-length documentary film about women guerillas in a Kurdistan Workers' Party (PKK) Free Women's Unit, in combat against the Islamic State of Iraq and the Levant (ISIL), directed by the Kurdish Montreal filmmaker Zaynê Akyol. Shot in Iraqi Kurdistan, the film is co-produced by Montreal's Périphéria Productions, Germany's MitosFilm and the National Film Board of Canada.

The film was conceived and named for a woman, Gulîstan, who had been a role model for the director in her adopted home in Montreal, until she left to fight with the PKK. Akyol went to Iraq in 2010 in an unsuccessful effort to find her and make a film about her. Unable to locate Gulîstan, she found women who knew her, and the focus of the documentary shifted to telling Gulîstan's story through their memories of her. However, when she returned to Iraq to film in 2014, some of the women had died, while others were in combat. That made the focus of the film shift yet again to documenting the experiences of women like Gulîstan.

== Release and reception ==
The film had its World Premiere during Visions du Réel festival in 2016, and had its Canadian premiere at the 2016 Hot Docs festival.

=== Awards ===
In August 2016, it won the Doc Alliance Selection Award, presented by a collective of seven European documentary film festivals during Locarno Festival in Switzerland.

In November 2016, the filmmaker received the award for Best New Talent from Quebec/Canada at the Rencontres internationales du documentaire de Montréal. In January 2017, the film was nominated at the 5th Canadian Screen Awards for Best Feature Length Documentary and Best Editing in a Documentary (Mathieu Bouchard-Malo.

Étienne Roussy won the Prix Iris for Best Cinematography in a Documentary at the 19th Quebec Cinema Awards in 2017. The film was also nominated for Best Documentary Film and Best Editing in a Documentary (Bouchard-Malo).
