= Lunar Sway =

- Directed by: Nick Butler
- Screenplay by: Nick Butler
- Produced by: Lucas Meeuse; Jennifer Wrede
- Starring: Noah Parker; Douglas Smith; Liza Weil
- Cinematography: Dmitry Lopatin
- Edited by: Nick Butler
- Music by: Adrian Ellis; Walker Grimshaw
- Production company: Cloudy Pictures
- Distributed by: TLA Releasing; Optimale Distribution
- Release date: March 25, 2026 (BFI Flare)
- Running time: 98 minutes
- Country: Canada
- Language: English

Lunar Sway is a Canadian black comedy film, directed by Nick Butler and released in 2026. The film stars Noah Parker as Cliff, a young LGBTQ man living in the small desert town of Mooncrest, who is drawn into a wild spiral of events with his boyfriend Stew (Douglas Smith) after his estranged birth mother Marg (Liza Weil), a woman carrying many other secrets of her own, returns to town.

The cast also includes Grace Glowicki, Kaden Connors, Irina Dubova and Tyrone Benskin in supporting roles.

== Production ==
The film's production and casting were first announced in spring 2024. It was shot in September of that year, in British Columbia.

== Distribution ==
The film was screened for distributors in the First Look section at the 78th Locarno Film Festival in 2025.

It had its public premiere on March 25, 2026, at BFI Flare. It has been acquired by TLA Releasing and Optimale Distribution for commercial release later in 2026.
