= Waiting for Casimir =

- French: En attendant Casimir
- Directed by: Christian Mathieu Fournier
- Written by: Christian Mathieu Fournier
- Produced by: Nadine Beaudet; Christian Mathieu Fournier
- Cinematography: Christian Mathieu Fournier
- Edited by: René Roberge
- Music by: Martin Lizotte
- Production company: Les Vues du Fleuve
- Distributed by: Spira
- Release date: December 6, 2024 (Cinémathèque québécoise)
- Running time: 69 minutes
- Country: Canada
- Language: French

Waiting for Casimir (French: En attendant Casimir) is a Canadian documentary film, directed by Christian Mathieu Fournier and released in 2024. The film profiles a group of senior citizens living in a retirement home in Saint-Casimir, Quebec, drawing impressionistic parallels between their situation in a dreary environment marked by the slow passage of time and the relative lack of excitement and stimulation with cultural touchstones such as Waiting for Godot and the paintings of Edward Hopper.

The film premiered on December 6, 2024, at the Cinémathèque québécoise.

== Accolades ==
Award	Date of ceremony	Category	Recipient	Result	Ref.
Quebec Cinema Awards	2025	Best Cinematography in a Documentary	Christian Mathieu Fournier	Nominated	
Quebec Cinema Awards	2025	Best Original Music in a Documentary	Martin Lizotte	Nominated	
