= Miss Boots =

- French: Mlle Bottine
- Directed by: Yan Lanouette Turgeon
- Written by: Dominic James
- Based on: Bach and Broccoli (Bach et Bottine)
- Produced by: Antonello Cozzolino; Dominic James; Brigitte Léveillé
- Starring: Antoine Bertrand; Marguerite Laurence; Marilyn Castonguay
- Cinematography: Marie Davignon
- Edited by: Carina Baccanale
- Music by: Ramachandra Borcar
- Production companies: Les Productions La Fête; Attraction Images
- Distributed by: Immina Films
- Release date: September 29, 2024 (Schlingel)
- Running time: 114 minutes
- Country: Canada
- Language: Quebec French

Miss Boots (French: Mlle Bottine) is a Canadian children's comedy film, directed by Yan Lanouette Turgeon and released in 2024. A modernized remake of the 1986 film Bach and Broccoli (Bach et Bottine), the film stars Antoine Bertrand as Philippe, an opera composer who is entrusted with the care of his young niece Simone (Marguerite Laurence) after the death of her parents, and is shaken out of his crippling social anxiety by the need to take care of Simone and her pet skunk Bottine.

The cast also includes Marilyn Castonguay, Mani Soleymanlou, Mateo Laurent Membreño Daigle, Benoît Gouin, François Chénier, Ellen David, Jean-François Provençal, Myriam Fournier, Louise Turcot and Dino Tavarone.

The film did not precisely replicate the original film's screenplay, instead introducing new elements such as Philippe's struggle with anxiety replacing Jean-Claude's simple negligence in the original, and other efforts to present more fully rounded adult characters.

== Production and release ==
The film was shot in Montreal in fall 2023.

It premiered at the Schlingel International Children's Film Festival in September 2024. It subsequently had a gala screening on November 18, 2024, at Montreal's Théâtre Maisonneuve, before opening commercially on November 29.

== Awards ==
| Award | Date of ceremony | Category | Recipient(s) | Result | Ref(s) |
|---|---|---|---|---|---|
| Schlingel International Children's Film Festival | 2024 | Club of Festivals Children Jury Prize | Miss Boots | Won | |
| Schlingel International Children's Film Festival | 2024 | Best Children's Performance | Marguerite Laurence | Won | |
| Quebec Cinema Awards | 2025 | Best Film | Antonello Cozzolino, Brigitte Léveillé, Dominic James | Nominated | |
| Quebec Cinema Awards | 2025 | Best Actor | Antoine Bertrand | Nominated | |
| Quebec Cinema Awards | 2025 | Best Actress | Marguerite Laurence | Nominated | |
| Quebec Cinema Awards | 2025 | Revelation of the Year | Marguerite Laurence | Won | |
| Quebec Cinema Awards | 2025 | Best Costume Design | Sharon Scott | Nominated | |
| Quebec Cinema Awards | 2025 | Prix Michel-Côté | Antonello Cozzolino, Brigitte Léveillé, Dominic James, Patrick Roy, Yan Lanouette Turgeon | Nominated | |
