= Maryse Legagneur =

Canadian filmmaker

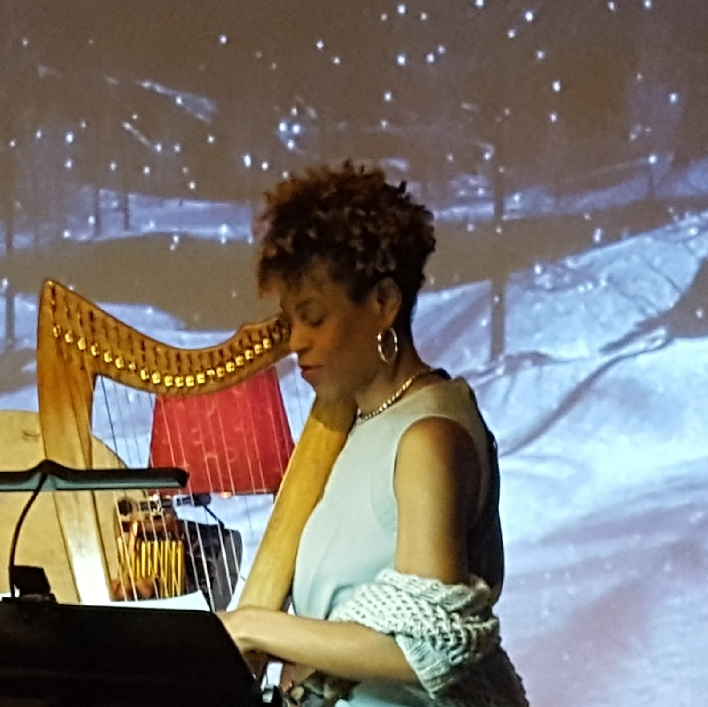
- Occupations: Film director, screenwriter
- Years active: 1990s–present

Maryse Legagneur is a Canadian filmmaker from Quebec, who released her narrative fiction debut film The Last Meal (Le Dernier repas) in 2024.

The winner of the 1998-99 season of the amateur filmmaking competition series La Course destination monde, she began her career as a documentarian, creating films and reportage for various documentary television series. She released her first theatrical documentary film, In the Name of the Mother and the Son (Au nom de la mère et du fils), in 2005.

The Last Meal premiered at the 2024 Quebec City Film Festival, where it was the winner of the Grand Prix. It subsequently won other film festival awards including Best First Feature at the 2025 Kingston Canadian Film Festival, and the Marimbas Award for international feature at the 2025 Miami Film Festival. It also received a Quebec Cinema Award nomination for Best First Film at the 27th Quebec Cinema Awards in 2025.
