= Angelica Lisk-Hann =

Canadian stunt performer

Angelica Lisk-Hann is a Canadian stunt performer and coordinator in film and television. She is most noted as a two-time winner of the Canadian Screen Award for Best Stunt Coordination, winning at the 8th Canadian Screen Awards in 2020 for Mary Kills People, and at the 14th Canadian Screen Awards in 2026 for 40 Acres.

She was also nominated in the same category at the 10th Canadian Screen Awards in 2022 for The Retreat, and at the 12th Canadian Screen Awards in 2024 for Robyn Hood.

She was the first Black Canadian woman ever to work as a stunt coordinator, and played a key role in advocating for the creation of a CSA category for stunt work. She began her career as a stunt performer before moving into coordination.
