= I Lost Sight of the Landscape =

- French: J'ai perdu de vue le paysage
- Directed by: Sophie Bédard Marcotte
- Written by: Sophie Bédard Marcotte
- Produced by: Pierre-Mathieu Fortin
- Starring: Sophie Bédard Marcotte
- Cinematography: Isabelle Stachtchenko
- Edited by: Myriam Magassouba
- Music by: Christophe Lamarche-Ledoux
- Production company: National Film Board of Canada
- Release date: April 2025 (Visions du Réel)
- Running time: 85 minutes
- Country: Canada
- Languages: English; French

I Lost Sight of the Landscape (French: J'ai perdu de vue le paysage) is a Canadian documentary film, directed by Sophie Bédard Marcotte and released in 2025. Initially conceived as a documentary about the creative process of playwright and theatre director Gabriel Charlebois Plante as he embarks on the creation of his 2024 play Cette colline n’est jamais vraiment silencieuse, the film evolves into a more personal revelation as Bédard Marcotte and Charlebois Plante fall in love and become a couple.

The film premiered in April 2025 at Visions du Réel. It was later screened at the Montreal International Documentary Festival.
