= Who Loves the Sun (2024 film) =

2024 Canadian short film directed by Arshia Shakiba

- Film poster
- Directed by: Arshia Shakiba
- Written by: Arshia Shakiba
- Produced by: Zaynê Akyol; Arshia Shakiba
- Cinematography: Arshia Shakiba
- Edited by: Mathieu Bouchard-Malo
- Music by: Ilyaa Ghafouri
- Production company: Edessa Productions
- Release date: September 2024 (Venice)
- Running time: 19 minutes
- Country: Canada
- Language: Arabic

Who Loves the Sun is a 2024 Canadian short documentary film, written and directed by Arshia Shakiba.

== Summary ==
An exploration of life in Syria, the film profiles Mahmood, a man who is working for the region's makeshift oil refineries that have been set up to keep the Syrian economy going in the face of the Syrian civil war.

== Release ==
The film premiered at the 81st Venice International Film Festival, where it won the award for Best Short Film in the Orizzonti competition. It had its Canadian premiere at the 2024 Toronto International Film Festival.

== Accolades ==
The film was named to TIFF's annual Canada's Top Ten list for 2024.

The film received a Canadian Screen Award nomination for Best Short Documentary at the 13th Canadian Screen Awards in 2025.

It was nominated for Best Short Film at the 2025 Directors Guild of Canada awards.

It won the awards for Best Short Documentary and Most Successful Short Film Outside Quebec at the 27th Quebec Cinema Awards in 2025.
