= Canadian Screen Award for Best Stunt Coordination =

Annual Canadian film award

- Country: Canada
- Presented by: Academy of Canadian Cinema & Television
- First award: 2019
- Currently held by: Angelica Lisk-Hann for 40 Acres (2025)
- Website: academy.ca/awards

The Canadian Screen Award for Best Stunt Coordination is an annual award, presented as part of the Canadian Screen Awards program to honour the year's best stunt coordination in Canadian film and television production. A single award is presented, for which work in both film and television projects is eligible.

The award was presented for the first time at the 8th Canadian Screen Awards in 2020. It was classified as a television-specific category that year, before becoming a blended film and television category the following year.

At the 14th Canadian Screen Awards in 2026, for the first time in the category's history the nominees consisted entirely of films rather than television series, although the Academy of Canadian Cinema and Television's current submission rules do not indicate that television projects have been removed from eligibility.

== 2010s ==
Year	Nominees	Project	Ref
2019; 8th Canadian Screen Awards
2019; 8th Canadian Screen Awards	Angelica Lisk-Hann, Tally Rodin	Mary Kills People: "No Happy Endings Here"	
2019; 8th Canadian Screen Awards	Randy Butcher	Cardinal: "Helen"	
2019; 8th Canadian Screen Awards	Stéphane Lefebvre, Spencer Birman	Thicker Than Water	
2019; 8th Canadian Screen Awards	Dan Skene	Letterkenny: "In It to Win It"	

== 2020s ==
Year	Nominees	Project	Ref
2020; 9th Canadian Screen Awards
2020; 9th Canadian Screen Awards	Jean Frenette, Jean-François Lachapelle	Blood Quantum	
2020; 9th Canadian Screen Awards	Randy Butcher	Trickster	
2020; 9th Canadian Screen Awards	Tyler Hall	Goddess of the Fireflies (La déesse des mouches à feu)	
2020; 9th Canadian Screen Awards	Dan Skene	Letterkenny	
2021; 10th Canadian Screen Awards
2021; 10th Canadian Screen Awards	John Stead	Pretty Hard Cases: "Jellybeans"	
2021; 10th Canadian Screen Awards	Bill Ferguson	Dangerous	
2021; 10th Canadian Screen Awards	Angelica Lisk-Hann	The Retreat	
2021; 10th Canadian Screen Awards	George Tchortov	See for Me	
2022; 11th Canadian Screen Awards
2022; 11th Canadian Screen Awards	John Stead, Anita Nittoly, Dejah Dixon-Green, Nova Zatzman, George Tchortov	Pretty Hard Cases: "Crystal Ball"	
2022; 11th Canadian Screen Awards	Jean-François Lachapelle	Family Game (Arsenault et fils)	
2022; 11th Canadian Screen Awards	Paul Nigro	Auto Aficionado: "Drift Racing"	
2022; 11th Canadian Screen Awards	Dan Skene	Letterkenny: "King of Suckers"	
2022; 11th Canadian Screen Awards	Wayne Wells	The Fight Machine	
2023; 12th Canadian Screen Awards
2023; 12th Canadian Screen Awards	Sean Skene, Dan Skene, Cam Fergus	Shoresy: "Set the Tone"	
2023; 12th Canadian Screen Awards	Angelica Lisk-Hann, Kirpa Budwal, Victoria Goodman, Howard Green, Dillon Jagersky, Daniel Lavigne, Greg Leach, Yvette McKoy	Robyn Hood: "Outlaws"	
2023; 12th Canadian Screen Awards	Stéphane Lefebvre	Marry F*** Kill	
2023; 12th Canadian Screen Awards	Dan Skene	Letterkenny: "Degens"	
2023; 12th Canadian Screen Awards	John Stead	Pretty Hard Cases: "Always a Bridesmaid"	
2024; 13th Canadian Screen Awards
2024; 13th Canadian Screen Awards	Steven McMichael, Leslie McMichael	Wynonna Earp: Vengeance	
2024; 13th Canadian Screen Awards	James Binkley, Andrew Simpson	Out Come the Wolves	
2024; 13th Canadian Screen Awards	Jean Frenette	Dark Match	
2024; 13th Canadian Screen Awards	Sean Skene, Rick Skene	Deaner '89	
2024; 13th Canadian Screen Awards	John Stead	Law & Order Toronto: Criminal Intent: "The Key to the Castle"	
2025; 14th Canadian Screen Awards
2025; 14th Canadian Screen Awards	Angelica Lisk-Hann	40 Acres	
2025; 14th Canadian Screen Awards	Alex Chung, Tyler Williams	Deathstalker	
2025; 14th Canadian Screen Awards	Dan Iaboni	Whistle	
2025; 14th Canadian Screen Awards	Chris Mark, Carl Fortin	Honey Bunch	
2025; 14th Canadian Screen Awards	Sébastien Rouleau, Tom Eirikson, Jordan Dodds	In Cold Light	
