= Impossible Figures and Other Stories I =

- Directed by: Marta Pajek
- Written by: Marta Pajek
- Produced by: Piotr Szczepanowicz, Grzegorz Wacławek, Maral Mohammadian
- Production companies: National Film Board of Canada, Animoon
- Release date: September 2021
- Running time: 16mn
- Countries: Poland, Canada

Impossible Figures and Other Stories I is a 2021 Polish and Canadian short film and the third (but chronologically first) chapter of a trilogy of animated stories written and directed by Polish filmmaker Marta Pajek. The film has been critically acclaimed and featured in several festivals, such as Linoleum Festival, DOK Leipzig and the Paris International Animation Film Festival. The film qualified for the 95th Academy Awards in the eligible films under the category Best Animated Short Film, but was not selected as one of the final five nominees.

== Plot ==
An older woman explores the labyrinthine streets of a deserted city. During the walk, she recalls the memories of her loved ones in a melancholic monologue.

== Reception ==
Since its release, the film has been selected in various festivals and academies around the world:

Year	Award	Category	Status	Ref
2021	DOK Leipzig	Golden Dove Short Animated Film	Won	
2021	Animateka International Animation Film Festival	Grand Prix	Won	
2022	Paris International Animation Film Festival	Best Artistic Concept	Won	
2022	Animafest Zagreb	Special Mention	Won	
2023	Canadian Screen Awards	Best Animated Short	Pending	
