= Negar Nemati =

Iranian-Canadian costume designer

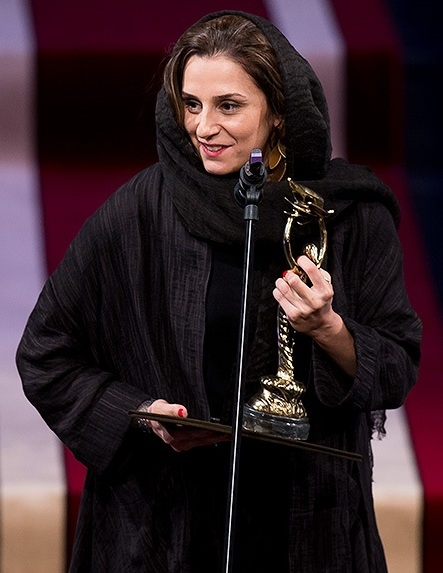
- Occupation: Costume designer
- Years active: 2010s–present

Negar Nemati is an Iranian-Canadian film and theatrical costume designer, most noted for her work on the films Pig (Khook), and Universal Language.

== Filmography ==
- Modest Reception (Paziraie sadeh) - 2012
- The Orange Suit (Narenji Poush) - 2012
- Ziba - 2012
- Bending the Rules (Ghaedeye tasadof) - 2013
- Koshk - 2014
- Ice Age (Asre Yakhbandan) - 2015
- A Dragon Arrives! (Ejhdeha Vared Mishavad!) - 2016
- 50 Kilos of Sour Cherries (50 Kilo Albaloo) - 2016
- Blockage (Sade ma'bar) - 2017
- Negar - 2017
- Pig (Khook) - 2018
- To Catch a Mouse - 2018
- Fault Line (Gosal) - 2018
- Samanthology - 2019
- One in Two People - 2019
- Merging with the Infinite - 2019
- A Hero (Qahremaan) - 2021
- Universal Language - 2024
- Seven Days - 2024
- Do Us Part - 2025

== Awards ==
| Award | Year | Category | Work | Result | Ref. |
|---|---|---|---|---|---|
| Fajr International Film Festival | 2016 | Crystal Simorgh for Best Costume Design | A Dragon Arrives! (Ejhdeha Vared Mishavad!) | Nominated | |
| Fajr International Film Festival | 2017 | Crystal Simorgh for Best Costume Design | Negar | Nominated | |
| Canadian Alliance of Film and Television Costume Arts and Design | 2022 | Best Costume Design in International Feature or TV | A Hero (Qahremaan) | Nominated | |
| Canadian Alliance of Film and Television Costume Arts and Design | 2025 | Best Costume Design in Film Sci-Fi/Fantasy | Universal Language | Won | |
| Canadian Screen Awards | 2025 | Best Costume Design | Universal Language | Won | |
