= Maral Mohammadian =

Iranian-Canadian film producer (born 1980)

- Born: November 15, 1980 (age 45); Tehran
- Citizenship: Iranian; Canadian
- Education: Carleton University
- Occupation: Film producer
- Known for: The Weatherman and the Shadowboxer

Maral Mohammadian is an Iranian Canadian film producer based in Montreal. She has been a producer at the English Films Unit of the National Film Board of Canada since 2014, and is also the producer of the NFB’s flagship mentorship program, Hothouse, developing Canada’s top rising talents. Mohammadian is mostly known for producing award-winning films The Weatherman and the Shadowboxer (2014) by Randall Okita, Deyzangeroo (2017) by Ehsan Gharib and for co-producing Maybe Elephants (2023) by Norwegian-Canadian director Torill Kove.

Maral is a member of the Academy of Canadian Cinema & Television. As of 2024, she is also a member of the Academy of Motion Picture Arts and Sciences.

== Career ==
Mohammadian studied at Carleton University, graduating in 2003 with a Bachelor of Arts in Film Studies with a minor in Music. After graduating, she lived in Ottawa for seven years, and worked at the Ottawa International Animation Festival (OIAF) before moving to Montreal in 2007 for a position as associate producer at the National Film Board of Canada. In 2014, she became a producer at their English Animation Studio and has produced or co-produced over 30 films at the NFB since then, including the award-winning shorts Freaks of Nurture by director Alexandra Lemay and the international coproductions Hide by UK-born director and animator Daniel Gray and Impossible Figures and other Stories I (2021) by Polish director Marta Pajek.

== Filmography ==
=== Animated films ===
- 2014: The Weatherman and the Shadowboxer (short film) - producer. Directed by Randall Lloyd Okita
- 2015: BAM (short film) - producer. Directed by Howie Shia
- 2016: I Am Here (short film) - co-producer. Directed by Eoin Duffy
- 2017: The Cannonball Woman (short film) - co-producer. Directed by Albertine Zullo and David Toutevoix
- 2017: Deyzangeroo (short film) - producer. Directed by Ehsan Gharib
- 2018: Freaks of Nurture (short film) - producer. Directed by Alexandra Lemay
- 2019: Shannon Amen (short film) - producer. Directed by Chris Dainty
- 2020: HIDE (short film) - co-producer. Directed by Daniel Gray
- 2021: Impossible Figures and other stories I (short film) - co-producer. Directed by Marta Pajek
- 2024: Inkwo for When the Starving Return (short film) - co-producer. Directed by Amanda Strong
- 2024: Maybe Elephants (short film) - co-producer. Directed by Torill Kove

=== Documentary ===
- 2015: Five Stories (short film) - producer. Directed by Aisling Chin-Yee
- 2017: Eleven Moving Moments with Evelyn Lambart (feature film) - producer. Directed by Donald McWilliams
- 2018: Andrew! Alexander! (short film) - co-producer. Directed by Josh Raskin
- 2023: The Kudelka Method (short film) - producer. Directed by Yung Chang

=== Other ===
- 2018: Museum of Symmetry (VR adventure game) - co-producer. Directed by Paloma Dawkins

== Recognition ==
Mohammadian has produced numerous films that have been internationally acclaimed, including Maybe Elephants (2024), which received the Canadian Film Award at the 2024 Spark Animation Festival, Impossible Figures & Other Stories I, which won the Golden Dove for Best Short Animated Film at DOK Leipzig and the Grand Prize at Animateka Animation International Film Festival, and Freaks of Nurture (2018), which won the Best Comedy Short at the NYC Short Film Festival.

The VR project Museum of Symmetry (2018), co-produced by Mohammadian, also received several awards, including the 2019 Canadian Screen Award for Best VR Game, the Kids Choice Awards at the 2019 Cinekid Festival, and the Gold Audience Awards for Best VR at the Fantasia International Film Festival.
