= Marilou Richer =

Canadian casting director

Marilou Richer is a Canadian casting director. She is most noted for her work on the films Red Rooms (Les Chambres rouges), for which she was a Prix Iris nominee for Best Casting at the 25th Quebec Cinema Awards in 2023, and Universal Language, for which she won the Canadian Screen Award for Best Casting in a Film at the 13th Canadian Screen Awards in 2025.

Her other credits have included the films Mothers and Monsters, Heat Spell (L'Été des chaleurs), Himalia and Black Dog.

She is married to actor Rémi-Pierre Paquin.
