= Christophe Lamarche-Ledoux =

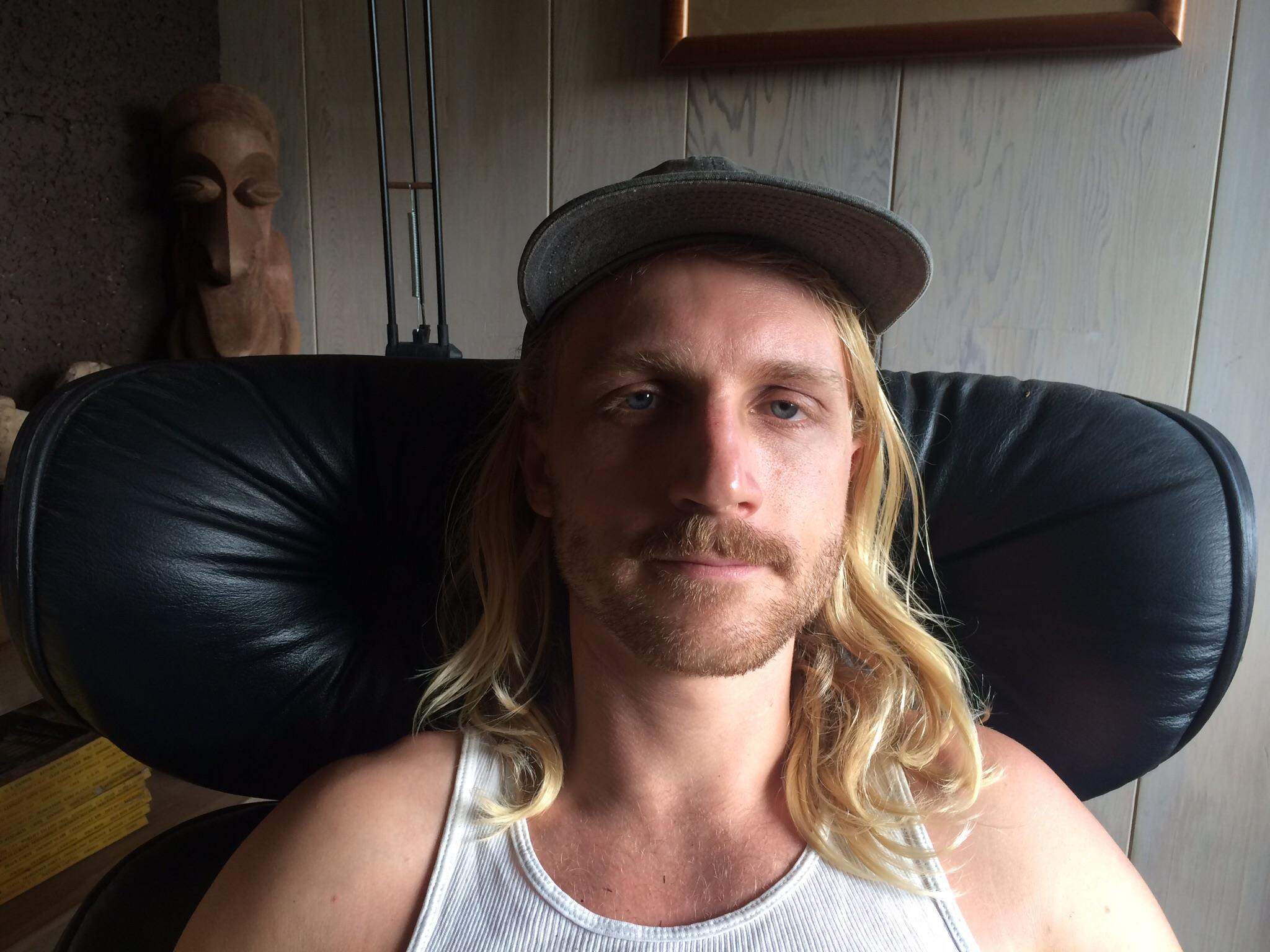
The Quebec composer and musician Christophe Lamarche-Ledoux

Christophe Lamarche-Ledoux is a Canadian musician and composer from Sherbrooke, Quebec.

He began his career as an indie rock and experimental music musician, performing with bands such as Sexyboy, Organ Mood, Chocolat and Rock Forest. He began composing film soundtracks in the 2010s.

He has also collaborated with Stéphane Lafleur on the instrumental electronic music project Feu Doux, and produced Warren Spicer's debut album with his side project Unessential Oils.

== Filmography ==
- You're Sleeping Nicole (Tu dors Nicole) - 2014
- Mutants - 2016
- Gulîstan, Land of Roses (Gulîstan, terre de roses) - 2016
- The Tesla World Light - 2017
- The Twentieth Century - 2019
- Wanted: Strong Woman - 2019
- Saint-Narcisse - 2020
- Chauffer le dehors - 2020
- Archipelago (Archipel) - 2021
- Like the Ones I Used to Know (Les grandes claques) - 2021
- Like a House on Fire - 2021
- Viking - 2022
- Universal Language - 2024
- Tout sur Margo - 2024
- Peak Everything (Amour Apocalypse) - 2025
- I Lost Sight of the Landscape (J'ai perdu de vue le paysage) - 2025
- The Mechanics of Borders (La Mécanique des frontières) - 2025
- A Fire There (Un feu au loin) - 2026
- Ladies and Gentlemen, Brian Mulroney (Mesdames et Messieurs, Brian Mulroney) - 2026

== Awards ==
Award	Year	Category	Work	Result	Ref.
SOCAN Songwriting Prize	2014	French Songwriter	"Nos corps" with Jimmy Hunt, Emmanuel Éthier	Nominated	
Prix Iris	2015	Best Original Music	You're Sleeping Nicole (Tu dors Nicole) with Rémy Nadeau-Aubin	Won	
Prix Iris	2022	Best Original Music in a Documentary	Archipelago (Archipel) with Stéphane Lafleur	Won	
Prix Iris	2023	Best Original Music	Viking with Mathieu Charbonneau	Nominated	
