= Isabelle Stachtchenko =

Canadian cinematographer

Isabelle Stachtchenko is a Canadian cinematographer, most noted for her work on the 2024 film Universal Language.

She began her career in the early 2010s, working on short films and music videos until gaining her first major feature film credit on Sophie Bédard Marcotte's Winter Claire (Claire l'hiver). Her subsequent credits have included The Greatest Country in the World (Le Meilleur pays du monde), L.A. Tea Time, This House (Cette maison), How to Get Your Parents to Divorce (Pas d'chicane dans ma cabane!), Summer of 2000 (Été 2000), Afterwards (Après-coups) and I Lost Sight of the Landscape (J'ai perdu de vue le paysage).

In 2020 she was one of the creators of Anthologie 2020, a short documentary "chain letter" film about the COVID-19 pandemic in Quebec which was screened at the 2021 Festival du nouveau cinéma.
