= Ila Firouzabadi =

Iranian Canadian interdisciplinary artist

Ila Firouzabadi is an Iranian Canadian interdisciplinary artist based in Montreal, Quebec. She is most noted as a cowriter with Matthew Rankin and Pirouz Nemati of the 2024 film Universal Language, for which they received a Canadian Screen Award nomination for Best Original Screenplay at the 13th Canadian Screen Awards in 2025.
