= Maybe Elephants =

2024 Canadian-Norwegian animated short film

- Norwegian: Kanskje det var elefanter
- Directed by: Torill Kove
- Written by: Torill Kove
- Produced by: Lise Fearnley; Maral Mohammadian; Tonje Skar Reiersen
- Narrated by: Torill Kove
- Production companies: National Film Board of Canada; Mikrofilm
- Release date: 2024
- Running time: 16 minutes
- Countries: Canada; Norway
- Languages: English; Swahili

Maybe Elephants (Norwegian: Kanskje det var elefanter) is a 2024 Canadian-Norwegian animated short film written and directed by Academy Award winner Torill Kove. The 16-minutes animated film about family and memories has been selected in various international film festivals, including Annecy International Animation Film Festival and Spark Animation Film Festival where the film won the Canadian Film Prize. The film is listed as part of the qualified shorts under consideration in the 2025 Academy Award Best Animated Short Film Category.

The film was named to TIFF's annual Canada's Top Ten list for 2024.

== Plot ==
Three teenage sisters find themselves uprooted from their small town in Norway when their mother decides to move to Nairobi, Kenya, in an attempt to escape the dark cloud that has been following her. The film is inspired by Kove's own experiences, in the same fashion as her previous short Me and My Moulton.

== Release ==
Since its release, the film has been selected in various festivals around the world:

Award	Date	Category	Recipient	Status	ref
Annecy International Animation Film Festival	2024	Cristal for Best Short Film	Torill Kove	Nominated	
Spark Animation Film Festival	2024	Canadian Film Prize	Torill Kove	Won	
Animation Is Film Festival	2024	Short Film Grand Prize	Torill Kove	Nominated	
American Film Institute Festival	2024	Shorts Program : Family Friendly	Torill Kove	Nominated	
London International Animation Festival	2024	Figures in Focus	Torill Kove	Nominated	
Bucheon International Animation Festival	2024	Audience Prize	Torill Kove	Won	
Vila do Conde International Short Film Festival	2024	International Competition	Torill Kove	Nominated	
Canadian Screen Awards	2025	Best Animated Short	Torill Kove, Lise Fearnley, Maral Mohammadian, Tonje Skar Reiersen	Won	
Quebec Cinema Awards	2025	Best Animated Short Film	Torill Kove, Lise Fearnley, Maral Mohammadian, Tonje Skar Reiersen	Won	
