= Pirouz Nemati =

Iranian Canadian actor and screenwriter

Pirouz Nemati (born 1987) is an Iranian Canadian actor and screenwriter based in Montreal, Quebec. He is most noted as a performer in, and cowriter with Matthew Rankin and Ila Firouzabadi, of the 2024 film Universal Language, for which he received Canadian Screen Award nominations for Best Lead Performance in a Comedy Film and Best Original Screenplay at the 13th Canadian Screen Awards in 2025.

In 2025, he appeared in Ryan McKenna's short film Solitudes, which premiered at the 78th Locarno Film Festival.

He has also had credits as a film editor and director. His documentary film Hemela, about Iranian Canadian restaurateur Hemela Pourafzal, premiered at the 2025 Vancouver International Film Festival.
