= Tonje Skar Reiersen =

Norwegian film producer

Tonje Skar Reiersen is a Norwegian producer of animated films. She is most noted as a producer of Torill Kove's 2024 short film Maybe Elephants, which won the Canadian Screen Award for Best Animated Short at the 13th Canadian Screen Awards, and was a Prix Iris nominee for Best Animated Short Film at the 27th Quebec Cinema Awards.

Her other credits have included Kove's 2017 short film Threads, and Kajsa Næss's 2022 feature film Titina.
