= Winter Claire =

- Directed by: Sophie Bédard Marcotte
- Written by: Sophie Bédard Marcotte
- Produced by: Sophie Bédard Marcotte; Caroline Galipeau
- Starring: Sophie Bédard Marcotte; Samuel Brassard; Alexa-Jeanne Dubé; Micheline Lanctôt
- Cinematography: Isabelle Stachtchenko
- Edited by: Joël Morin-ben Abdallah
- Music by: Gabrielle Guénette
- Production company: Les Films de l'Autre
- Release date: October 6, 2017 (FNC)
- Running time: 65 minutes
- Country: Canada
- Language: French

Winter Claire (French: Claire l'hiver) is a Canadian comedy film, directed by Sophie Bédard Marcotte and released in 2017. The film stars Bédard Marcotte as Claire, a young artist going through a difficult Winter while a cargo spaceship is threatening to crash to the Earth.

The film's cast also includes Samuel Brassard, Alexa-Jeanne Dubé, Micheline Lanctôt and Alex B. Martin.

The film premiered at the 2017 Festival du nouveau cinéma, before going into commercial release in March 2018.

The film was a shortlisted finalist for the Prix collégial du cinéma québécois in 2019.
