= Danielle Fichaud =

Canadian actress

Danielle Fichaud (born April 13, 1954) is a Canadian actress from Quebec. She is most noted for her performance in the 2021 film Aline, for which she was a César Award nominee for Best Supporting Actress at the 47th César Awards and a Prix Iris nominee for Best Actress at the 24th Quebec Cinema Awards.

== Filmography ==
=== Television ===
- Chez Denise
- Willie
- Fred-dy
- Tag
- Fortier
- Jasmine
- Musée Éden
- Miss Météo
- Vrak la Vie
- Bunker, le cirque
- Virginie
- District 31
- Les Crues

=== Film ===
- 1995 - The Confessional (Le Confessionnal)
- 1996 - Poverty and Other Delights (Joyeux calvaire)
- 2000 - Heaven (Le Petit ciel)
- 2006 - Deliver Me (Délivrez-moi)
- 2007 - Days of Darkness (L'Âge des ténèbres)
- 2009 - Vital Signs (Les Signes vitaux)
- 2009 - The Legacy (La Donation)
- 2010 - Piché: The Landing of a Man (Piché, entre ciel et terre)
- 2015 - The Passion of Augustine (La Passion d'Augustine)
- 2019 - Mon ami Walid
- 2021 - Aline
- 2023 - Testament
- 2024 - Universal Language (Une Langue universelle)
