= Arshia Shakiba =

Canadian filmmaker

Arshia Shakiba is a Canadian documentary filmmaker, cinematographer and editor.

He is most noted for his work on the feature documentary film Rojek, for which he and Nicolas Canniccioni received a Prix Iris nomination for Best Cinematography in a Documentary at the 25th Quebec Cinema Awards in 2023, and his short documentary film Who Loves the Sun, which won the award for Best Short Film in the Orizzonti competition at the 81st Venice International Film Festival.

== Filmography ==
- A Beautiful Day - 2003 (director, editor)
- Few Strands of Hair - 2005 (cinematographer)
- The Minima - 2010 (editor)
- Frame & Wall - 2014 (editor)
- Light and Sound - 2014 (editor)
- The Guests - 2018 (director, cinematographer)
- Rojek - 2023 (cinematographer)
- Who Loves the Sun - 2024 (director, cinematographer)
