= Denis Houle =

Canadian actor

Denis Houle is a Canadian film and television actor from Quebec. He is most noted for his performance in the film Viking, for which he received a Prix Iris nomination for Best Supporting Actor at the 25th Quebec Cinema Awards in 2023.
