= 19th Quebec Cinema Awards =

Awards show for Quebecois cinema in 2016

The 19th Quebec Cinema Awards ceremony was held on 4 June 2017, hosted by actors Guylaine Tremblay and Édith Cochrane, to recognize talent and achievement in the Cinema of Quebec. Formerly known as the Jutra Awards, the Prix Iris name was announced in October 2016. Several categories were also added this year, including for Casting, Visual Effects, Revelation and Documentary Editing and Cinematography, while the Billet d'or for straightforward box office performance was succeeded by the Prix du public (Public Prize), chosen by viewers' votes.

The first winners were announced at the Gala des artisans on 1 June, with producer Lyse Lafontaine also honoured with the Iris Hommage for 30 years of contributions to the province's film industry.

Xavier Dolan's It's Only the End of the World (Juste la fin du monde) led with twelve nominations and won five awards, including Best Film and Best Director. It also became the second film to win Best Film without a Best Screenplay nomination.

Two Lovers and a Bear also received twelve nominations and won two awards. Bad Seeds (Les mauvaises herbes) followed with nine nominations resulting in two awards: Best Supporting Actor for Luc Picard and Best Screenplay. Kiss Me Like a Lover (Embrasse-moi comme tu m'aimes) also received nine nominations and won Best Supporting Actress for Céline Bonnier. It became the fourth film to receive nine nominations without being nominated for Best Film.

Nelly won four awards from six nominations, including Best Actress for Mylène Mackay. Emmanuelle Lussier-Martinez became the second actress and fifth performer overall to receive multiple acting nominations during the same ceremony, although she didn't win either Best Actress or Best Supporting Actress.

Gabriel Arcand, Céline Bonnier and Luc Picard each won their third acting award during the ceremony. Arcand had previously won Best Actor for Post Mortem and Best Supporting Actor for Congorama, Bonnier had previously won Best Actress twice for Deliver Me (Délivrez-moi) and The Passion of Augustine (La passion d'Augustine) while Picard had previously won Best Actor for February 15, 1839 (15 février 1839) and Best Supporting Actor for The Collector (Le collectionneur).

== Winners and nominees ==
Nominees and winners are:

Best Film	Best Director
It's Only the End of the World (Juste la fin du monde) — Sylvain Corbeil, Nancy Grant, Xavier Dolan, Elisha Karmitz, Nathanaël Karmitz, Michel Merkt; Bad Seeds (Les mauvaises herbes) — Lorraine Dufour, Luc Vandal; Before the Streets (Avant les rues) — Chloé Leriche; Those Who Make Revolution Halfway Only Dig Their Own Graves (Ceux qui font les révolutions à moitié n'ont fait que se creuser un tombeau) — Hany Ouichou; Two Lovers and a Bear — Roger Frappier, Jonathan Bronfman, Ellen Hamilton	Xavier Dolan, It's Only the End of the World (Juste la fin du monde); Louis Bélanger, Bad Seeds (Les mauvaises herbes); Bachir Bensaddek, Montreal, White City (Montréal la blanche); Chloé Leriche, Before the Streets (Avant les rues); Kim Nguyen, Two Lovers and a Bear
Best Actor	Best Actress
Gabriel Arcand, A Kid (Le fils de Jean); Dane DeHaan, Two Lovers and a Bear; Antoine Olivier Pilon, 1:54; Émile Schneider, Where Atilla Passes (Là où Attila passe); Gaspard Ulliel, It's Only the End of the World (Juste la fin du monde)	Mylène Mackay, Nelly; Karina Aktouf, Montreal, White City (Montréal la blanche); Nathalie Baye, It's Only the End of the World (Juste la fin du monde); Emmanuelle Lussier-Martinez, Those Who Make Revolution Halfway Only Dig Their Own Graves (Ceux qui font les révolutions à moitié n'ont fait que se creuser un tombeau); Tatiana Maslany, Two Lovers and a Bear
Best Supporting Actor	Best Supporting Actress
Luc Picard, Bad Seeds (Les mauvaises herbes); Guillaume Cyr, The New Life of Paul Sneijder (La nouvelle vie de Paul Sneijder); Martin Dubreuil, Shambles (Maudite poutine); Tony Nardi, Kiss Me Like a Lover (Embrasse-moi comme tu m'aimes); Simon Pigeon, Prank	Céline Bonnier, Kiss Me Like a Lover (Embrasse-moi comme tu m'aimes); Marion Cotillard, It's Only the End of the World (Juste la fin du monde); Emmanuelle Lussier-Martinez, Bad Seeds (Les mauvaises herbes); Léa Seydoux, It's Only the End of the World (Juste la fin du monde); Cynthia Wu-Maheux, On My Mother's Side (L'origine des espèces)
Best Screenplay	Best Cinematography
Louis Bélanger and Alexis Martin, Bad Seeds (Les mauvaises herbes); Bachir Bensaddek, Montreal, White City (Montréal la blanche); André Forcier and Linda Pinet, Kiss Me Like a Lover (Embrasse-moi comme tu m'aimes); Chloé Leriche, Before the Streets (Avant les rues); Kim Nguyen, Two Lovers and a Bear	André Turpin, It's Only the End of the World (Juste la fin du monde); Glauco Bermudez, Before the Streets (Avant les rues); Nicolas Bolduc, Two Lovers and a Bear; Josée Deshaies, Nelly; Tobie Marier Robitaille, Nitro Rush
Best Art Direction	Best Sound
Éric Barbeau, Those Who Make Revolution Halfway Only Dig Their Own Graves (Ceux qui font les révolutions à moitié n'ont fait que se creuser un tombeau); Jean Babin, Wild Run: The Legend (Chasse-Galerie: La légende); Patrice Bengle, Kiss Me Like a Lover (Embrasse-moi comme tu m'aimes); Dominique Desrochers, Nitro Rush; David Brisbin, Isabelle Guay and Jean-Pierre Paquet, Race	Claude Beaugrand, Bernard Gariépy Strobl and Claude La Haye, Two Lovers and a Bear; Pierre-Jules Audet, Luc Boudrias and Claude La Haye, Race; Sylvain Bellemare, Stéphane Bergeron and Martyne Morin, Before the Streets (Avant les rues); Stéphane Bergeron, Martin Desmarais and Marie-Claude Gagné, Nitro Rush; Olivier Calvert, Stephen De Oliveira and Hans Laitres, Shambles (Maudite poutine)
Best Editing	Best Original Music
Richard Comeau, Two Lovers and a Bear; Jean-François Bergeron, The 3 L'il Pigs 2 (Les 3 p'tits cochons 2); Mathieu Denis, Those Who Make Revolution Halfway Only Dig Their Own Graves (Ceux qui font les révolutions à moitié n'ont fait que se creuser un tombeau); Chloé Leriche, Before the Streets (Avant les rues); Jules Saulnier, Split (Écartée)	Frannie Holder, Charles Lavoie and Vincent Legault, Nelly; Guy Bélanger, Bad Seeds (Les mauvaises herbes); Thierry Amar, David Bryant and Kevin Doria, Shambles (Maudite poutine); Martin Léon, Kiss Me Like a Lover (Embrasse-moi comme tu m'aimes); Robert Marcel Lepage, Before the Streets (Avant les rues)
Best Costume Design	Best Makeup
Francesca Chamberland, Wild Run: The Legend (Chasse-Galerie: La légende); Caroline Bodson, Boris Without Béatrice (Boris sans Béatrice); Mario Davignon, Race; Sophie Lefebvre, Bad Seeds (Les mauvaises herbes); Madeleine Tremblay, Kiss Me Like a Lover (Embrasse-moi comme tu m'aimes)	Djina Caron, Nelly; Claire De Ernst, Kiss Me Like a Lover (Embrasse-moi comme tu m'aimes); Nicole Lapierre, Wild Run: The Legend (Chasse-Galerie: La légende); Maïna Militza, It's Only the End of the World (Juste la fin du monde); Marlène Rouleau, Nitro Rush
Best Hairstyling	Best Visual Effects
Martin Lapointe, Nelly; Marie-France Cardinal and Véronique-Anne Leblanc, Wild Run: The Legend (Chasse-Galerie: La légende); Réjean Goderre, Race; Marcelo Padovani, Kiss Me Like a Lover (Embrasse-moi comme tu m'aimes); Denis Vidal, It's Only the End of the World (Juste la fin du monde)	Jean-Pierre Boies, Mathieu Jolicoeur, Jean-François Talbot, King Dave; Marc Hall, The Cyclotron (Le cyclotron); Martin Lipmann, Cynthia Mourou, Benoît Touchette, Race; Daniel Lavoie, André Montambeault, Two Lovers and a Bear; John Tate, Kiss Me Like a Lover (Embrasse-moi comme tu m'aimes)
Best Documentary	Best Cinematography in a Documentary
Manor (Manoir) — Martin Fournier, Pier-Luc Latulippe; Callshop Istanbul — Hind Benchekroun, Sami Mermer; Gulîstan, Land of Roses (Gulîstan, terre de roses) — Zaynê Akyol, Mehmet Aktaş, Nathalie Cloutier, Fanny Drew, Yanick Létourneau, Sarah Mannering, Denis McCready; Living With Giants (Chez les géants) — Aude Leroux-Lévesque, Sébastien Rist, Jean-Simon Chartier; Perfect (Parfaites) — Jérémie Battaglia, Sylvie Van Brabant	Étienne Roussy, Gulîstan, Land of Roses (Gulîstan, terre de roses); Jérémie Battaglia, Perfect (Parfaites); John Price, I Am the Blues; Sébastien Rist, Aude Leroux-Lévesque, Living With Giants (Chez les géants); Olivier Tétreault, Manor (Manoir)
Best Live Short	Best Animated Short
Mutants — Alexandre Dostie; Oh What a Wonderful Feeling — François Jaros; Plain and Simple (Tout simplement) — Raphaël Ouellet; The Voice (La voce) — David Uloth; Wild Skin (La peau sauvage) — Ariane Louis-Seize	Blind Vaysha — Theodore Ushev; Casino — Steven Woloshen; I Like Girls (J'aime les filles) — Diane Obomsawin; Mamie — Janice Nadeau; Oscar — Marie-Josée Saint-Pierre
Revelation of the Year	Best Casting
Rykko Bellemare, Before the Streets (Avant les rues); Étienne Galloy, Prank; Whitney Lafleur, Split (Écartée); Sasha Migliarese, My Friend Dino (Mon ami Dino); Kakki Peter, Two Lovers and a Bear	Xavier Dolan, It's Only the End of the World (Juste la fin du monde); Emanuelle Beaugrand-Champagne and Nathalie Boutrie, Bad Seeds (Les mauvaises herbes); Lucie Robitaille and Heidi Levitt, Two Lovers and a Bear
Most Successful Film Outside Quebec	Public Prize
It's Only the End of the World (Juste la fin du monde), Xavier Dolan; Boris Without Béatrice (Boris sans Béatrice), Denis Côté; Shambles (Maudite poutine), Karl Lemieux; Nelly, Anne Émond; Two Lovers and a Bear, Kim Nguyen	1:54; The 3 L'il Pigs 2 (Les 3 p'tits cochons 2); It's Only the End of the World (Juste la fin du monde); Bad Seeds (Les mauvaises herbes); Votez Bougon
Best Editing in a Documentary	Iris Tribute
Catherine Legault, Family Demolition (La démolition familiale); Mathieu Bouchard-Malo, Gulîstan, Land of Roses (Gulîstan, terre de roses); Jean-François Lord, Manor (Manoir); Sami Mermer, Callshop Istanbul; René Roberge, Living With Giants (Chez les géants)	Lyse Lafontaine

== Multiple wins and nominations ==
=== Films with multiple nominations ===
Nominations	Film
12	It's Only the End of the World (Juste la fin du monde)
12	Two Lovers and a Bear
9	Bad Seeds (Les mauvaises herbes)
9	Kiss Me Like a Lover (Embrasse-moi comme tu m'aimes)
8	Before the Streets (Avant les rues)
6	Nelly
5	Race
4	Nitro Rush
4	Shambles (Maudite poutine)
4	Those Who Make Revolution Halfway Only Dig Their Own Graves (Ceux qui font les révolutions à moitié n'ont fait que se creuser un tombeau)
4	Wild Run: The Legend (Chasse-Galerie: La légende)
3	Gulîstan, Land of Roses (Gulîstan, terre de roses)
3	Living With Giants (Chez les géants)
3	Manor (Manoir)
3	Montreal, White City (Montréal la blance)
2	1:54
2	The 3 L'il Pigs 2 (Les 3 p'tits cochons 2)
2	Boris Without Béatrice (Boris sans Béatrice)
2	Callshop Istanbul
2	Perfect (Parfaites)
2	Prank
2	Split (Écartée)

=== Films with multiple wins ===
Wins	Film
5	It's Only the End of the World (Juste la fin du monde)
4	Nelly
2	Bad Seeds (Les mauvaises herbes)
2	Two Lovers and a Bear
