= Prix Iris for Best Costume Design =

Annual film award presented by Québec Cinéma

The Prix Iris for Best Costume Design (French: Prix Iris des meilleurs costumes) is an annual film award, presented by Québec Cinéma as part of its Prix Iris awards program, to honour the year's best costume design in films made within the Cinema of Quebec.

The award was presented for the first time at the 6th Jutra Awards in 2004.

Until 2016, it was known as the Jutra Award for Best Costume Design in memory of influential Quebec film director Claude Jutra. Following the withdrawal of Jutra's name from the award, the 2016 award was presented under the name Québec Cinéma. The Prix Iris name was announced in October 2016.

Ginette Magny received the most nominations, ten, while Carmen Alie and Francesca Chamberland won the most awards, with three each, including consecutive wins: in 2013 and 2014 for Alie and in 2021 and 2022 for Chamberland. Xavier Dolan is the only costume designer to receive a nomination for a film he also directed with Mommy.

== 2000s ==
Year	Costume designer(s)	Film
2004; 6th Jutra Awards
2004; 6th Jutra Awards	Louise Gagné	Seducing Doctor Lewis (La Grande séduction)
2004; 6th Jutra Awards	Francesca Chamberland	Mambo Italiano
2004; 6th Jutra Awards	Brigitte Desroches	Immortals (Les immortels)
2004; 6th Jutra Awards	Sophie Lefebvre	Gaz Bar Blues
2005; 7th Jutra Awards
2005; 7th Jutra Awards	François Barbeau	Battle of the Brave (Nouvelle-France)
2005; 7th Jutra Awards	Mario Davignon	Head in the Clouds
2005; 7th Jutra Awards	Michèle Hamel	Machine Gun Molly (Monica la mitraille)
2005; 7th Jutra Awards	Denis Sperdouklis	Bittersweet Memories (Ma vie en cinémascope)
2006; 8th Jutra Awards
2006; 8th Jutra Awards	Ginette Magny	C.R.A.Z.Y
2006; 8th Jutra Awards	Carmen Alie	Audition (L'Audition)
2006; 8th Jutra Awards	Francesca Chamberland	The Rocket (Maurice Richard)
2006; 8th Jutra Awards	Ginette Magny	Les Boys IV
2007; 9th Jutra Awards
2007; 9th Jutra Awards	Michèle Hamel	A Sunday in Kigali (Un dimanche à Kigali)
2007; 9th Jutra Awards	Anne Duceppe	The Genius of Crime (Le génie du crime)
2007; 9th Jutra Awards	François Laplante	Black Eyed Dog
2007; 9th Jutra Awards	Ginette Magny	A Family Secret (Le secret de ma mère)
2008; 10th Jutra Awards
2008; 10th Jutra Awards	Carlo Poggioli, Kazuko Kurosawa	Silk
2008; 10th Jutra Awards	Brigitte Desroches	Twilight (La Brunante)
2008; 10th Jutra Awards	Monic Ferland	The 3 L'il Pigs (Les 3 p'tits cochons)
2008; 10th Jutra Awards	Ginette Magny	Surviving My Mother (Comment survivre à sa mère)
2009; 11th Jutra Awards
2009; 11th Jutra Awards	Carmen Alie	Babine
2009; 11th Jutra Awards	Michèle Hamel	Mommy Is at the Hairdresser's (Maman est chez le coiffeur)
2009; 11th Jutra Awards	Michèle Hamel	The American Trap (Le Piège américain)
2009; 11th Jutra Awards	Ginette Magny	Le Banquet

== 2010s ==
Year	Costume designer(s)	Film
2010; 12th Jutra Awards
2010; 12th Jutra Awards	Judy Jonker	Through the Mist (Dédé, à travers les brumes)
2010; 12th Jutra Awards	Carmen Alie	The Master Key (Grande Ourse, la clé des possibles)
2010; 12th Jutra Awards	Atuat Akkitirq, Micheline Ammaq	Before Tomorrow (Le jour avant le lendemain)
2010; 12th Jutra Awards	Sophie Lefebvre	The Timekeeper (L'Heure de vérité)
2010; 12th Jutra Awards	Ginette Magny	Sticky Fingers (Les doigts croches)
2011; 13th Jutra Awards
2011; 13th Jutra Awards	Sophie Lefebvre	Incendies
2011; 13th Jutra Awards	Carmen Alie	The Comeback (Cabotins)
2011; 13th Jutra Awards	Mariane Carter	City of Shadows (La Cité)
2011; 13th Jutra Awards	Francesca Chamberland	The Child Prodigy (L'Enfant prodige)
2011; 13th Jutra Awards	Julie-Anne Tremblay	Aurelie Laflamme's Diary (Le Journal d'Aurélie Laflamme)
2012; 14th Jutra Awards
2012; 14th Jutra Awards	François Barbeau	For the Love of God (Pour l'amour de Dieu)
2012; 14th Jutra Awards	Michèle Hamel	Thrill of the Hills (Frisson des collines)
2012; 14th Jutra Awards	Sophie Lefebvre	Coteau rouge
2012; 14th Jutra Awards	Ginette Magny	A Life Begins (Une vie qui commence)
2012; 14th Jutra Awards	Mireille Roy	Snow and Ashes
2013; 15th Jutra Awards
2013; 15th Jutra Awards	Carmen Alie	Ésimésac
2013; 15th Jutra Awards	Mariane Carter	Mars and April (Mars et Avril)
2013; 15th Jutra Awards	Monic Ferland	L'Affaire Dumont
2013; 15th Jutra Awards	Sophie Lefebvre	Inch'Allah
2013; 15th Jutra Awards	Éric Poirier	War Witch (Rebelle)
2014; 16th Jutra Awards
2014; 16th Jutra Awards	Carmen Alie	Louis Cyr
2014; 16th Jutra Awards	Caroline Bodson	Hunting the Northern Godard (Chasse au Godard d'Abbittibbi)
2014; 16th Jutra Awards	Judy Jonker	Triptych (Triptyque)
2014; 16th Jutra Awards	Nicoletta Massone	Upside Down
2014; 16th Jutra Awards	Madeleine Tremblay	The Storm Within (Rouge sang)
2015; 17th Jutra Awards
2015; 17th Jutra Awards	Valérie Lévesque	1987
2015; 17th Jutra Awards	Francesca Chamberland	Henri Henri
2015; 17th Jutra Awards	Xavier Dolan	Mommy
2015; 17th Jutra Awards	Véronique Marchessault	Maïna
2015; 17th Jutra Awards	Denis Sperdouklis	The Grand Seduction
2016; 18th Quebec Cinema Awards
2016; 18th Quebec Cinema Awards	Michèle Hamel	The Passion of Augustine (La passion d'Augustine)
2016; 18th Quebec Cinema Awards	Mario Davignon	After the Ball
2016; 18th Quebec Cinema Awards	Judy Jonker	Corbo
2016; 18th Quebec Cinema Awards	Ginette Magny	Elephant Song
2016; 18th Quebec Cinema Awards	Éric Poirier	Turbo Kid
2017; 19th Quebec Cinema Awards
2017; 19th Quebec Cinema Awards	Francesca Chamberland	Wild Run: The Legend (Chasse-Galerie: La Légende)
2017; 19th Quebec Cinema Awards	Caroline Bodson	Boris Without Béatrice (Boris sans Béatrice)
2017; 19th Quebec Cinema Awards	Mario Davignon	Race
2017; 19th Quebec Cinema Awards	Sophie Lefebvre	Bad Seeds (Les Mauvaises herbes)
2017; 19th Quebec Cinema Awards	Madeleine Tremblay	Kiss Me Like a Lover (Embrasse-moi comme tu m'aimes)
2018; 20th Quebec Cinema Awards
2018; 20th Quebec Cinema Awards	Mario Davignon	Hochelaga, Land of Souls (Hochelaga, terre des âmes)
2018; 20th Quebec Cinema Awards	Julie Bécotte	We Are the Others (Nous sommes les autres)
2018; 20th Quebec Cinema Awards	Josée Castonguay	Barefoot at Dawn (Pieds nus dans l'aube)
2018; 20th Quebec Cinema Awards	Francesca Chamberland	The Little Girl Who Was Too Fond of Matches (La petite fille qui aimait trop les allumettes)
2018; 20th Quebec Cinema Awards	Brigitte Desroches	Cross My Heart (Les rois mongols)
2019; 21st Quebec Cinema Awards
2019; 21st Quebec Cinema Awards	Mariane Carter	La Bolduc
2019; 21st Quebec Cinema Awards	Caroline Bodson	Ghost Town Anthology (Répertoire des villes disparues)
2019; 21st Quebec Cinema Awards	Mélanie Garcia	For Those Who Don't Read Me (À tous ceux qui ne me lisent pas)
2019; 21st Quebec Cinema Awards	Anne-Karine Gauthier	1991
2019; 21st Quebec Cinema Awards	Patricia McNeil	The Great Darkened Days (La grande noirceur)

== 2020s ==
Year	Costume designer(s)	Film	Ref
2020; 22nd Quebec Cinema Awards
2020; 22nd Quebec Cinema Awards	Patricia McNeil	The Twentieth Century	
2020; 22nd Quebec Cinema Awards	Valérie Lévesque	Mafia Inc.	
2020; 22nd Quebec Cinema Awards	Ginette Magny	Jouliks	
2020; 22nd Quebec Cinema Awards	Patricia McNeil	A Brother's Love (La femme de mon frère)	
2020; 22nd Quebec Cinema Awards	Caroline Poirier	And the Birds Rained Down (Il pleuvait des oiseaux)	
2021; 23rd Quebec Cinema Awards
2021; 23rd Quebec Cinema Awards	Francesca Chamberland	The Vinland Club (Le Club Vinland)	
2021; 23rd Quebec Cinema Awards	Caroline Bodson	Underground (Souterrain)	
2021; 23rd Quebec Cinema Awards	Patricia McNeil, Ann Roth	My Salinger Year (Mon année Salinger)	
2021; 23rd Quebec Cinema Awards	Noémi Poulin	Blood Quantum	
2021; 23rd Quebec Cinema Awards	Sharon Scott	My Very Own Circus (Mon cirque à moi)	
2022; 24th Quebec Cinema Awards
2022; 24th Quebec Cinema Awards	Francesca Chamberland	Maria Chapdelaine	
2022; 24th Quebec Cinema Awards	Josée Castonguay	The Time Thief (L'arracheuse de temps)	
2022; 24th Quebec Cinema Awards	Ginette Magny, Camille Janbon, Catherine Leterrier	Aline	
2022; 24th Quebec Cinema Awards	Patricia McNeil	Drunken Birds (Les oiseaux ivres)	
2022; 24th Quebec Cinema Awards	Éric Poirier	Beans	
2023; 25th Quebec Cinema Awards
2023; 25th Quebec Cinema Awards	Sophie Lefebvre	Viking	
2023; 25th Quebec Cinema Awards	Mariane Carter	Victoire (La Cordonnière)	
2023; 25th Quebec Cinema Awards	Guillaume Laflamme	Babysitter	
2023; 25th Quebec Cinema Awards	Sophie Lefebvre	A Respectable Woman (Une femme respectable)	
2023; 25th Quebec Cinema Awards	Annabelle Roy, Delphine Gagné	Farador	
2024; 26th Quebec Cinema Awards
2024; 26th Quebec Cinema Awards	Cédric Quenneville	Solo	
2024; 26th Quebec Cinema Awards	Kelly-Anne Bonieux	Humanist Vampire Seeking Consenting Suicidal Person (Vampire humaniste cherche suicidaire consentant)	
2024; 26th Quebec Cinema Awards	Francesca Chamberland	Sisters and Neighbors! (Nos belles-sœurs)	
2024; 26th Quebec Cinema Awards	Sophie Lefebvre	Tell Me Why These Things Are So Beautiful (Dis-moi pourquoi ces choses sont si belles)	
2024; 26th Quebec Cinema Awards	Madeleine Tremblay	Ababooned (Ababouiné)	
2025; 27th Quebec Cinema Awards
2025; 27th Quebec Cinema Awards	Gabrielle Lauzier	Vile & Miserable (Vil & Misérable)	
2025; 27th Quebec Cinema Awards	Patricia McNeil	Peak Everything (Amour apocalypse)	
2025; 27th Quebec Cinema Awards	Patricia McNeil	Two Women (Deux femmes en or)	
2025; 27th Quebec Cinema Awards	Negar Nemati	Universal Language (Une langue universelle)	
2025; 27th Quebec Cinema Awards	Sharon Scott	Miss Boots (Mlle Bottine)	

== Multiple wins and nominations ==
=== Multiple wins ===
Wins	Costume Designer
3	Carmen Alie
3	Francesca Chamberland
2	François Barbeau
2	Michèle Hamel
2	Sophie Lefebvre

=== Three or more nominations ===
Nominations	Costume Designer
10	Ginette Magny
9	Francesca Chamberland
9	Sophie Lefebvre
7	Patricia McNeil
6	Carmen Alie
6	Michèle Hamel
4	Caroline Bodson
4	Mariane Carter
4	Mario Davignon
3	Brigitte Desroches
3	Judy Jonker
3	Éric Poirier
3	Madeleine Tremblay

== See also ==
- Canadian Screen Award for Best Costume Design
