= 21st Quebec Cinema Awards =

2019 Canadian film awards ceremony

The 21st Quebec Cinema Awards, the 21st overall ceremony in the history of the Quebec Cinema Awards, were held on June 2, 2019, in Montreal. Cinematographer Pierre Mignot also received the Iris Tribute.

The ceremony marked the first time that four films received ten nominations or more, with 1991 receiving sixteen nominations, a new record. The film won five awards including Best Film, Best Director and Best Supporting Actress for Sandrine Bisson, who had previously won the same award for the same role for 1981.

For Those Who Don't Read Me (À tous ceux qui ne me lisent pas) followed with twelve nominations and won two competitive awards: Best Actor for Martin Dubreuil and Best Screenplay. It also won a third award for Best First Film which was announced during the ceremony. The category would become competitive with multiple nominees the following year.

La Bolduc received eleven nominations and won six awards, the most of the night, including Best Actress for Debbie Lynch-White. Ghost Town Anthology (Répertoire des villes disparues) was nominated for ten awards, but went home empty-handed.

A Colony (Une colonie) received nine nominations and won three awards, including two acting awards, becoming the first film to win both Best Supporting Actor for Robin Aubert and Revelation of the Year for Émilie Bierre. It also became the second film to receive three acting nominations in the same category, for Revelation of the Year, after Les Boys III received three nominations for Best Actor at the 4th Jutra Awards.

== Winners and nominees ==
Nominees and winners are:

Best Film	Best Director
1991 — Nicole Robert; La Bolduc — Valérie D'Auteuil, André Rouleau; A Colony (Une colonie) — Fanny Drew, Sarah Mannering; For Those Who Don't Read Me (À tous ceux qui ne me lisent pas) — Luc Déry, Élaine Hébert, Kim McCraw; Genesis (Genèse) — Galilé Marion-Gauvin; Ghost Town Anthology (Répertoire des villes disparues) — Ziad Touma; The Great Darkened Days (La grande noirceur) — Sylvain Corbeil, Nancy Grant	Ricardo Trogi, 1991; Denis Côté, Ghost Town Anthology (Répertoire des villes disparues); Geneviève Dulude-De Celles, A Colony (Une colonie); Maxime Giroux, The Great Darkened Days (La grande noirceur); Yan Giroux, For Those Who Don't Read Me (À tous ceux qui ne me lisent pas)
Best Actor	Best Actress
Martin Dubreuil, For Those Who Don't Read Me (À tous ceux qui ne me lisent pas); Jean-Carl Boucher, 1991; Pierre-Luc Brillant, The Fireflies Are Gone (La disparition des lucioles); Patrick Hivon, We Are Gold (Nous sommes Gold); Théodore Pellerin, Genesis (Genèse)	Debbie Lynch-White, La Bolduc; Josée Deschênes, Ghost Town Anthology (Répertoire des villes disparues); Brigitte Poupart, Les Salopes, or the Naturally Wanton Pleasure of Skin (Les salopes ou le sucre naturel de la peau); Karelle Tremblay, The Fireflies Are Gone (La disparition des lucioles); Carla Turcotte, Sashinka
Best Supporting Actor	Best Supporting Actress
Robin Aubert, A Colony (Une colonie); Pier-Luc Funk, Genesis (Genèse); Vincent Leclerc, The Fall of the American Empire (La chute de l'empire américain); Alexandre Nachi, 1991; Henri Picard, For Those Who Don't Read Me (À tous ceux qui ne me lisent pas)	Sandrine Bisson, 1991; Céline Bonnier, For Those Who Don't Read Me (À tous ceux qui ne me lisent pas); Larissa Corriveau, Ghost Town Anthology (Répertoire des villes disparues); Mélissa Désormeaux-Poulin, The Far Shore (Dérive); Natalia Dontcheva, Sashinka
Best Screenplay	Best Cinematography
Guillaume Corbeil and Yan Giroux, For Those Who Don't Read Me (À tous ceux qui ne me lisent pas); Geneviève Dulude-De Celles, A Colony (Une colonie); André Gulluni and Claude Lalonde, Origami; Eric K. Boulianne, Before We Explode (Avant qu'on explose); Ricardo Trogi, 1991	Sara Mishara, The Great Darkened Days (La grande noirceur); Steve Asselin, 1991; Ian Lagarde, For Those Who Don't Read Me (À tous ceux qui ne me lisent pas); François Messier-Rheault, Ghost Town Anthology (Répertoire des villes disparues); Ronald Plante, La Bolduc
Best Art Direction	Best Sound
Raymond Dupuis, La Bolduc; Sylvain Dion and Patricia McNeil, The Great Darkened Days (La grande noirceur); Marie-Pier Fortier, Ghost Town Anthology (Répertoire des villes disparues); Marie-Claude Gosselin, For Those Who Don't Read Me (À tous ceux qui ne me lisent pas); Christian Legaré, 1991	Claude Beaugrand, Michel B. Bordeleau, Luc Boudrias and Gilles Corbeil, La Bolduc; Mimi Allard, Sylvain Bellemare, Bernard Gariépy Strobl and Claude La Haye, Allure; Stéphane Bergeron, Olivier Calvert and Gilles Corbeil, The Fireflies Are Gone (La disparition des lucioles); Luc Boudrias, Frédéric Cloutier and Stephen De Oliveira, The Great Darkened Days (La grande noirceur); Sylvain Brassard and Michel Lecoufle, 1991
Best Editing	Best Original Music
Yvann Thibaudeau, 1991; Michel Arcand, La Bolduc; Mathieu Bouchard-Malo, Genesis (Genèse); Mathieu Bouchard-Malo, The Great Darkened Days (La grande noirceur); Elric Robichon, For Those Who Don't Read Me (À tous ceux qui ne me lisent pas)	Philippe Brault, The Fireflies Are Gone (La disparition des lucioles); Olivier Alary, The Great Darkened Days (La grande noirceur); Frédéric Bégin, 1991; Philippe Bergeron, We Are Gold (Nous sommes Gold); Peter Venne, Before We Explode (Avant qu'on explose)
Best Costume Design	Best Makeup
Mariane Carter, La Bolduc; Caroline Bodson, Ghost Town Anthology (Répertoire des villes disparues); Mélanie Garcia, For Those Who Don't Read Me (À tous ceux qui ne me lisent pas); Anne-Karine Gauthier, 1991; Patricia McNeil, The Great Darkened Days (La grande noirceur)	Nicole Lapierre, La Bolduc; Audrey Bitton, For Those Who Don't Read Me (À tous ceux qui ne me lisent pas); Virginie Boudreau, 1991; Léonie Lévesque-Robert, A Colony (Une colonie); Dominique T. Hasbani, Genesis (Genèse); Dominique T. Hasbani, Ghost Town Anthology (Répertoire des villes disparues)
Best Hairstyling	Best Visual Effects
Martin Lapointe, La Bolduc; Nathalie Dion, For Those Who Don't Read Me (À tous ceux qui ne me lisent pas); André Duval, The Fall of Sparta (La chute de Sparte); Daniel Jacob, 1991; Dominique T. Hasbani, Ghost Town Anthology (Répertoire des villes disparues)	Aurélia Abate, Delphine Lasserre, Bruno Maillard, Benoît Brière, Louis-Philippe Clavet, Valérie Garcia and Étienne Rodrigue, Just a Breath Away (Dans la brume); Jean-François Ferland and Marie-Claude Lafontaine, La Bolduc; Jean-Pierre Boies and Jean-François Talbot, 1991
Revelation of the Year	Best Casting
Émilie Bierre, A Colony (Une colonie); Irlande Côté, A Colony (Une colonie); Lévi Doré, The Fall of Sparta (La chute de Sparte); Maripier Morin, The Fall of the American Empire (La chute de l'empire américain); Jacob Whiteduck-Lavoie, A Colony (Une colonie)	Ariane Castellanos, A Colony (Une colonie); Nathalie Boutrie, The Fall of Sparta (La chute de Sparte); Chloé Cinq-Mars, The Far Shore (Dérive); Denis Côté, Ghost Town Anthology (Répertoire des villes disparues); Nolwenn Daste, Fanny Rainville and Kristina Wagenbauer, Sashinka
Best Documentary	Best Cinematography in a Documentary
Innu Nikamu: Resist and Sing (Innu Nikamu: Chanter la résistance); Anote's Ark; Cielo; The Other Rio (L'autre Rio); Pauline Julien, Intimate and Political (Pauline Julien, intime et politique)	Danae Elon and Itamar Mendes Flohr, A Sister's Song; Benjamín Echazarreta, Cielo; Sylvestre Guidi, New Memories; Alexandre Lampron, Des histoires inventées; Matthieu Rytz, Anote's Ark
Best Editing in a Documentary	Best Sound in a Documentary
René Roberge, Pauline Julien, Intimate and Political (Pauline Julien, intime et politique); Mila Aung-Thwin and Oana Suteu Khintirian, Anote's Ark; Natacha Dufaux, The Other Rio (L'autre Rio); Vincent Guignard and Alexandre Leblanc, A Sister's Song; Catherine Legault, My Mother's Letters (Les lettres de ma mère)	Cyril Bourseaux, Mélanie Gauthier, Simon Léveillé, Simon Plouffe, Lynne Trépanier, Jean Paul Vialard and Shikuan Shetush Vollant, Those Who Come, Will Hear (Ceux qui viendront, l'entendront); Claude Beaugrand, Luc Boudrias and Serge Giguère, My Mother's Letters (Les lettres de ma mère); Bruno Bélanger, Marie-Pierre Grenier and Francisco Heron De Alencar, The Other Rio (L'autre Rio); Olivier Calvert and Jean Paul Vialard, Pauline Julien, Intimate and Political (Pauline Julien, intime et politique); Andrés Carrasco, Miguel Hormazábal, Mauricio López, Alison McAlpine, Rodrigo Salvatierra, Carlo Sanchez Farías and Claudio Vargas, Cielo
Best Live Action Short Film	Best Animated Short Film
Brotherhood (Ikhwène) — Meryam Joobeur, Habib Attia, Sarra Ben-Hassen, Andreas Rocksén, Maria Gracia Turgeon; Fauve — Jérémy Comte, Maria Gracia Turgeon, Evren Boisjoli; Lunar-Orbit Rendezvous — Mélanie Charbonneau, Virginie Nolin; Milk — Santiago Menghini, Max Walker; My Boy (Mon Boy) — Sarah Pellerin, Fanny-Laure Malo, Annie-Claude Quirion	The Subject (Le sujet) — Patrick Bouchard; Bone Mother — Dale Hayward, Sylvie Trouvé; But One Bird Sang Not (Mais un oiseau ne chantait pas) — Pierre Hébert; Not Your Panda — Tigris Alt Sakda; The Sisters' Bedroom (La chambre des filles) — Claire Brognez
Most Successful Film Outside Quebec	Public Prize
The Fall of the American Empire (La chute de l'empire américain) — Denys Arcand; Cielo — Alison McAlpine; Eye on Juliet — Kim Nguyen; The Fireflies Are Gone (La disparition des lucioles) — Sébastien Pilote; Racetime (La course des tuques) — Benoît Godbout	1991; La Bolduc; The Fall of the American Empire (La chute de l'empire américain); The Fireflies Are Gone (La disparition des lucioles); Racetime (La course des tuques)
Best First Film	Tribute Award
For Those Who Don't Read Me (À tous ceux qui ne me lisent pas) — Yan Giroux	Pierre Mignot

== Multiple wins and nominations ==
=== Films with multiple nominations ===
Nominations	Film
16	1991
12	For Those Who Don't Read Me (À tous ceux qui ne me lisent pas)
11	La Bolduc
10	Ghost Town Anthology (Répertoire des villes disparues)
9	A Colony (Une colonie)
8	The Great Darkened Days (La grande noirceur)
6	The Fireflies Are Gone (La disparition des lucioles)
5	Genesis (Genèse)
4	Cielo
4	The Fall of the American Empire (La chute de l'empire américain)
3	Anote's Ark
3	The Fall of Sparta (La chute de Sparte)
3	The Other Rio (L'autre Rio)
3	Pauline Julien, Intimate and Political (Pauline Julien, intime et politique)
3	Sashinka
2	Before We Explode (Avant qu'on explose)
2	The Far Shore (Dérive)
2	My Mother's Letters (Les lettres de ma mère)
2	Racetime (La course des tuques)
2	A Sister's Song
2	We Are Gold (Nous sommes Gold)

=== Films with multiple wins ===
Wins	Film
6	La Bolduc
5	1991
3	A Colony (Une colonie)
3	For Those Who Don't Read Me (À tous ceux qui ne me lisent pas)
