= Chloé Cinq-Mars =

Canadian film director and screenwriter

Chloé Cinq-Mars is a Canadian film director and screenwriter from Quebec, most noted as writer of the 2018 film The Far Shore (Dérive).

The daughter of screenwriter Louise Pelletier, she was educated at the Université de Montréal. She has frequently collaborated with her husband, film director David Uloth, on many of his films, including as the writer of The Voice (La voce), which was a Prix Iris nominee for Best Live Action Short Film at the 19th Quebec Cinema Awards in 2017. In addition to writing The Far Shore, she served as the film's casting director, and received a Prix Iris nomination for Best Casting at the 21st Quebec Cinema Awards in 2019.

In 2019, she directed her own short film debut, The Cut (La Coupure).

Her feature debut as a director, Nesting (Peau à peau), completed production in September 2023 under the working title Oublier Charlotte. The film premiered at the 29th Fantasia International Film Festival in July 2025, where Cinq-Mars won the award for Best Canadian Director.
