= Hunting the Northern Godard =

- Film poster
- French: Chasse au Godard d'Abbittibbi
- Directed by: Éric Morin
- Written by: Éric Morin
- Produced by: David Pierrat
- Starring: Martin Dubreuil; Sophie Desmarais; Alexandre Castonguay
- Cinematography: Louis-Philippe Blain
- Edited by: Jonathan Tremblay
- Production company: Parce Que Films
- Release date: September 30, 2013 (Hamburg)
- Running time: 111 minutes
- Country: Canada
- Language: French

Hunting the Northern Godard (French: Chasse au Godard d'Abbittibbi) is a Canadian drama film, directed by Éric Morin and released in 2013. Inspired by influential film director Jean-Luc Godard's visit to the Abitibi-Témiscamingue region of Quebec in 1968, the film centres on the developing relationship between Paul (Martin Dubreuil), a musician from Montreal who accompanied Godard on the trip, and Marie (Sophie Desmarais), a young woman from Rouyn-Noranda who becomes drawn into a love triangle between Paul and her boyfriend Michel (Alexandre Castonguay).

The character of Paul was based on Pierre Harel of Offenbach.

Dubreuil's real-life garage rock band Les Breastfeeders appear in the film as Paul's band Les Tragédiens. Godard himself is a minor character in the film, portrayed by musician Jean-Philippe Goncalves, and the film includes narration by playwright René-Daniel Dubois.

The film received five Jutra Award nominations at the 16th Jutra Awards in 2014, for Best Art Direction (Marie-Hélène Lavoie), Best Costume Design (Caroline Bodson), Best Makeup (Maïna Militza), Best Hairstyling (Militza) and Best Sound (Yann Cleary and Martin Rouillard).
