= Cynthia Wu-Maheux =

Canadian actress

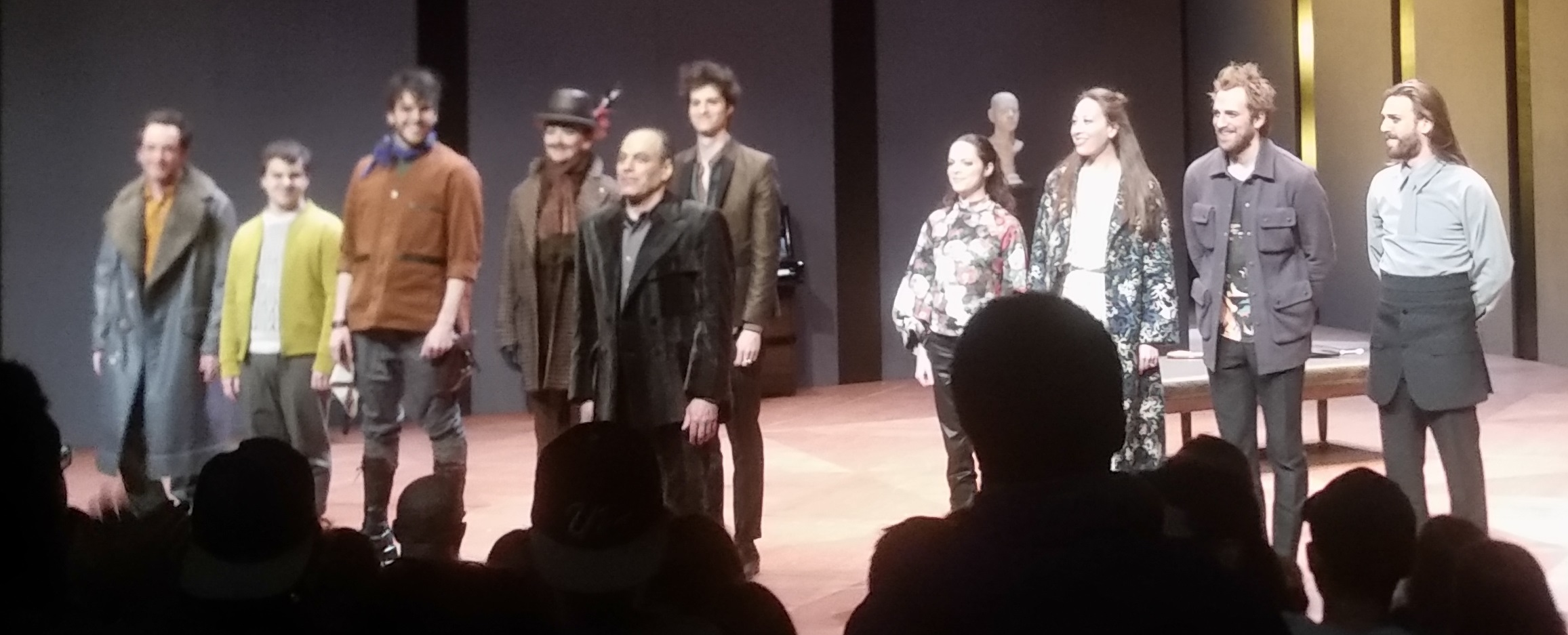

Cynthia Wu-Maheux is a Canadian actress from Trois-Rivières, Quebec. She is most noted for her performance in the film On My Mother's Side (L'Origine des espèces), for which she received a Prix Iris nomination for Best Supporting Actress at the 19th Quebec Cinema Awards in 2017.

She has also appeared in the films Honey, I'm in Love (Le Grand Départ), Polytechnique, The Bossé Empire (L'Empire Bo$$é), L'Affaire Dumont and Montreal, White City (Montréal la blanche), and the television series C.A, Les Hauts et les bas de Sophie Paquin, Tactik, Trauma, Plan B, District 31 and Classé secret (2022).
