= Lionel Groulx (disambiguation) =

Lionel Groulx (1878 – 1967), was a Roman Catholic priest, historian and Quebec nationalist.

Lionel Groulx or Lionel-Groulx may also refer to:

- Collège Lionel-Groulx, general and vocational college (CEGEP) in Sainte-Thérèse, Quebec
- Lionel-Groulx station a station of the Montreal Metro rapid transit system in Saint-Henri, south west of Montreal, Quebec
