= The Storm Within (2013 film) =

- Directed by: Martin Doepner
- Written by: Joseph Antaki; Martin Doepner; Jean Tourangeau
- Starring: Isabelle Guérard; Lothaire Bluteau; Anthony Lemke; Vincent Leclerc; Arthur Holden; Peter Miller
- Cinematography: Nathalie Moliavko-Visotzky
- Release date: 1 February 2013
- Running time: 93 minutes
- Country: Canada
- Languages: French; English

The Storm Within (French: Rouge sang) is a 2013 Canadian drama film. Directed by Martin Doepner, the film is set in 1799 and stars Isabelle Guérard as Espérance, a young mother who is forced to shelter five British soldiers from a snowstorm. The film also stars Lothaire Bluteau, Anthony Lemke, Vincent Leclerc, Arthur Holden and Peter Miller.

The film garnered three Canadian Screen Award nominations at the 2nd Canadian Screen Awards, including a Best Actress nod for Guérard and two nominations for the music of Michel Cusson, for Best Original Score and Best Original Song for "À la claire fontaine". It received two Jutra Award nominations at the 16th Jutra Awards in 2014, for Best Original Music (Cusson) and Best Costume Design (Madeleine Tremblay).
