= Kwena Bellemare-Boivin =

Indigenous actress

- Occupation: Actress; Musician
- Relatives: Rykko Bellemare

Kwena Bellemare-Boivin is an Indigenous film actress, who garnered a nomination for Best Supporting Actress at the 5th Canadian Screen Awards for her performance in Before the Streets (Avant les rues).

A member of the Atikamekw nation from Wemotaci, Quebec, she is the sister of Rykko Bellemare, who played the film's lead role. She also sings and dances with the Atikamekw traditional music group Northern Voice, and has appeared in the APTN television series Brigade des Nations and Le rythme.
