= The Voice (2015 film) =

2015 Canadian film

- Italian: La Voce
- Directed by: David Uloth
- Written by: Chloé Cinq-Mars
- Produced by: Galilé Marion-Gauvin; Dominique Noujeim; David Uloth
- Starring: Miro Lacasse; Catherine Ruel; Julie De Lafrenière; Harry Standjofski; Marc Labrèche
- Cinematography: Philippe Roy
- Edited by: Elisabeth Olga Tremblay; David Uloth
- Music by: Robert Marcel Lepage
- Production company: Sure Shot Productions
- Distributed by: Travelling Distribution
- Release date: September 1, 2015 (MWFF)
- Running time: 17 minutes
- Country: Canada

The Voice (Italian: La Voce) is a 2015 Canadian short drama film, directed by David Uloth. Inspired by the opera Lucia di Lammermoor and conceived as a film whose story would be carried by sound design rather than dialogue, the film stars Miro Lacasse as Edgar, an opera-loving employee at a pig slaughterhouse; one day, his plan to ask his girlfriend to marry him is derailed by the discovery that she is having an affair with his boss, leaving him in such a state of shock that he loses his voice and can communicate only by grunting and squealing like a pig.

The cast also includes Catherine Ruel, Julie De Lafrenière, Harry Standjofski and Marc Labrèche.

The film won the awards for Best Canadian Short Film at the 2016 Saguenay International Short Film Festival and the 2016 Quebec City Film Festival, and was a Prix Iris nominee for Best Live Action Short Film at the 19th Quebec Cinema Awards in 2017.
