= Shambles (film) =

- Theatrical release poster
- French: Maudite poutine
- Directed by: Karl Lemieux
- Written by: Karl Lemieux; Marie-Douce St-Jacques
- Produced by: Sylvain Corbeil; Nancy Grant
- Starring: Jean-Simon Leduc; Martin Dubreuil; François Aubin
- Cinematography: Mathieu Laverdière
- Edited by: Marc Boucrot
- Production company: Metafilms
- Release date: September 5, 2016
- Running time: 91 minutes
- Country: Canada
- Language: French

Shambles (French: Maudite poutine) is a Canadian drama film from Quebec. Directed by Karl Lemieux, the film premiered at the 2016 Venice Film Festival before going into theatrical release in Canada in 2017.

The film stars Jean-Simon Leduc as Vincent, a punk rock musician, who while on the run from the mob after stealing $10,000 worth of marijuana, reconnects with his estranged brother (Martin Dubreuil) whose life is also in a downward spiral. The film's original title is a standard Quebec French idiom which literally translates as "damned mess" or "shambles", and is not a reference to poutine in the culinary sense.

The film garnered four Prix Iris nominations at the 19th Quebec Cinema Awards in 2017.
