= Split (2016 Canadian film) =

Film by Lawrence Côté-Collins

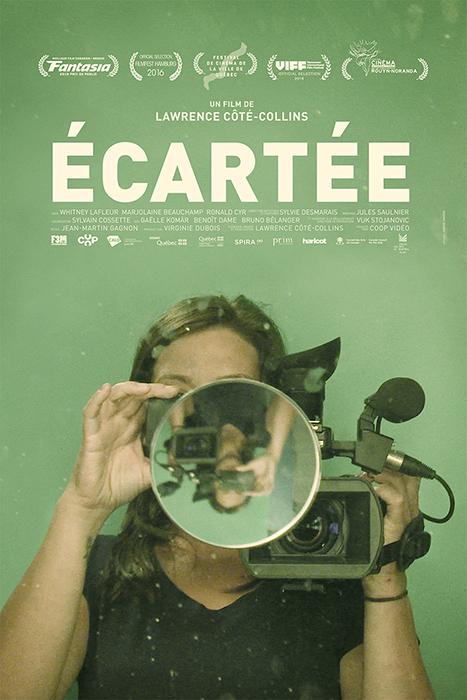
- Film poster
- French: Écartée
- Directed by: Lawrence Côté-Collins
- Written by: Lawrence Côté-Collins
- Produced by: Lawrence Côté-Collins; Virginie Dubois
- Starring: Marjolaine Beauchamp; Ronald Cyr; Whitney Lafleur
- Cinematography: Lawrence Côté-Collins
- Edited by: Jules Saulnier
- Music by: Eric Shaw
- Production company: Coop Vidéo de Montréal
- Release date: July 29, 2016 (Fantasia)
- Running time: 80 minutes
- Country: Canada
- Language: French

Split (French: Écartée) is a Canadian docufiction film, directed by Lawrence Côté-Collins and released in 2016. The film stars Marjolaine Beauchamp as Anick, a social worker making a film about criminal rehabilitation that centres on ex-convict Scott (Ronald Cyr) and his girlfriend Jessie (Whitney Lafleur).

== Cast ==
- Marjolaine Beauchamp
- Ronald Cyr
- Whitney Lafleur

== Distribution ==
The film premiered on July 29, 2016, at the Fantasia International Film Festival, before opening commercially in September.

== Critical response ==
Alex Rose of Cult MTL called it "a weird little mockumentary that clearly worships at the altar of Robert Morin."

== Awards ==
At Fantasia, the film received an honorable mention from the jury for the Barry Convex Award for best Canadian film.

The film received two Prix Iris nominations at the 19th Quebec Cinema Awards, for Best Editing (Jules Saulnier) and Revelation of the Year (Lafleur).
