= Rykko Bellemare =

Canadian actor and singer

- Born: 1991 (age 34–35); La Tuque, Quebec
- Citizenship: Atikamekw
- Occupation: Actor; Musician
- Relatives: Kwena Bellemare-Boivin

Rykko Bellemare (born 1991) is a Native Canadian film actor, best known for his lead role as Shawnouk in Before the Streets (Avant les rues). He won the Prix Iris for Revelation of the Year, its award for debut performances, at the 19th Quebec Cinema Awards for his work in the film.

A member of the Atikamekw nation from Wemotaci, Quebec, he is the brother of Kwena Bellemare-Boivin, who played his character's sister in the film. He is a dancer, drummer and singer with the Atikamekw traditional music group Northern Voice.
