= Isabelle Guérard =

Canadian actress

- Born: July 1, 1978 (age 46); Montreal, Quebec, Canada
- Occupation(s): film and television actor
- Known for: The Storm Within (Rouge sang)

Isabelle Guérard (born July 1, 1978) is a Canadian film and television actress. She garnered a Canadian Screen Award nomination as Best Actress at the 2nd Canadian Screen Awards in 2013 for The Storm Within (Rouge sang), and a Jutra Award nomination as Best Actress in 2010 for Detour (Détour).

Born in Montreal, Quebec, Guérard first came to prominence as a cast member on the teen drama series Watatatow, she also appeared in the films White Skin (La Peau blanche), Angel's Rage (La Rage de l'ange), Piché: The Landing of a Man (Piché: entre ciel et terre), French Kiss and The Guide to the Perfect Family (Le Guide de la famille parfaite), and the television series Le Négociateur, Mensonges and Motel Paradis (2022).

She was formerly living with her Watatatow castmate Hugo St-Cyr and later separated in 2008.
