= Jacques Newashish =

Canadian film actor, filmmaker, painter, and sculptor

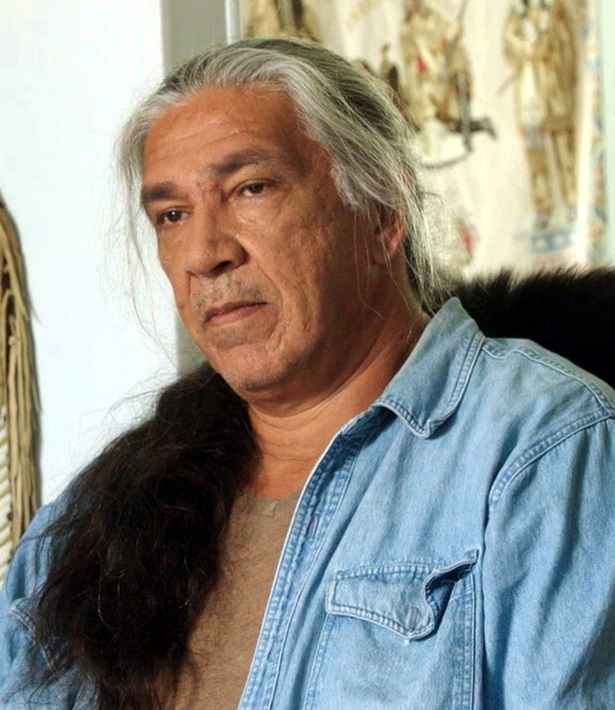
Jacques Newashish in Pow-Pow in 2017

Jacques Newashish (born 1958) is a Canadian film actor, filmmaker, painter, and sculptor. Newashish is a member of the Atikamekw nation and is from Wemotaci, Quebec. He was born in La Tuque, Quebec where he learned traditional values and ways of living. His father was a trapper and hunter and a teacher of the language and culture of the Atikamekw people. Newashish incorporates elements of Atikamekw culture into his artistic practice and is concerned with the preservation of the Atikamekw language and culture in the community.

As a multidisciplinary artist, Newashish works across a variety of mediums, including sculpture, painting, film, and storytelling. His work includes installations which frequently use natural materials which reflect Atikamekw culture.

Newashish garnered a Canadian Screen Award nomination for Best Supporting Actor at the 5th Canadian Screen Awards for his performance in Before the Streets (Avant les rues). In 2021 he appeared in the film Bootlegger, and in 2023 he appeared in Atikamekw Suns (Soleils Atikamekw).
