= On My Mother's Side =

- French: L'Origine des espèces
- Directed by: Dominic Goyer
- Written by: Dominic Goyer
- Produced by: Valérie d'Auteuil; André Rouleau
- Starring: Marc Paquet; Marc Béland; Élise Guilbault
- Cinematography: Mathieu Laverdière
- Edited by: Michel Grou
- Music by: Antoine Bédard
- Production company: Caramel Films
- Distributed by: Christal Films
- Release date: October 11, 2015 (FNC)
- Running time: 92 minutes
- Country: Canada
- Language: French

On My Mother's Side (French: L'Origine des espèces) is a Canadian psychological thriller film, directed by Dominic Goyer and released in 2015. The film stars Marc Paquet as David, an architect who discovers that his father Paul (Marc Béland) is not his real biological father, and undertakes an effort to uncover the truth of his origins.

The film's cast also includes Sylvie de Morais-Nogueira, Élise Guilbault, Germain Houde, David La Haye, Gilles Pelletier and Cynthia Wu-Maheux.

The film premiered at the 2015 Festival du nouveau cinéma, before going into commercial release in 2016.

Wu-Maheux received a Prix Iris nomination for Best Supporting Actress at the 19th Quebec Cinema Awards in 2017.
