= The Far Shore (2018 film) =

2018 Canadian film

- Film poster
- French: Dérive
- Directed by: David Uloth
- Written by: Chloé Cinq-Mars
- Produced by: Galilé Marion-Gauvin
- Starring: Éléonore Loiselle; Maèva Tremblay; Mélissa Désormeaux-Poulin
- Cinematography: Philippe Roy
- Edited by: Jean-François Bergeron; David Uloth
- Music by: Ramachandra Borcar
- Production company: Productions l'Unité Centrale
- Distributed by: Axia Films
- Release date: September 29, 2018 (VIFF)
- Running time: 104 minutes
- Country: Canada
- Language: French

The Far Shore (French: Dérive) is a Canadian drama film, directed by David Uloth and released in 2018. The film centres on teenage sisters Océane (Éléonore Loiselle) and Marine (Maèva Tremblay) Beauregard, who are coming of age in the aftermath of the death of their father André (Réal Bossé), while their mother Catherine (Mélissa Désormeaux-Poulin) is struggling to cope with the loss or properly take care of her daughters.

The film's cast also includes Emmanuel Schwartz, Émilie Bierre, Danielle Proulx and Isabelle Nélisse.

The film's screenplay was written by Chloé Cinq-Mars, Uloth's real-life wife, based in part on her own childhood. The film premiered on September 29, 2018 at the Vancouver International Film Festival, before opening commercially in March 2019.

The film received two Prix Iris nominations at the 21st Quebec Cinema Awards, for Best Supporting Actress (Désormeaux-Poulin) and Best Casting (Cinq-Mars).
