= Black Eyed Dog =

2006 Canadian drama film

- Directed by: Pierre Gang
- Written by: Jeremy John Bouchard
- Produced by: Sam Grana; Pierre Gang; Louise Jobin
- Starring: Sonya Salomaa; James Hyndman; David Boutin; Brendan Fletcher
- Cinematography: Daniel Vincelette
- Edited by: Aube Foglia
- Music by: Claude Fradette
- Production company: Sam Grana Productions
- Distributed by: TVA Films
- Release date: August 5, 2006 (Locarno)
- Running time: 115 minutes
- Country: Canada
- Language: English

Black Eyed Dog is a Canadian drama film, directed by Pierre Gang and released in 2006. The film stars Sonya Salomaa as Betty, a waitress in the small Miramichi-area town of Riverton, New Brunswick, who is going through a personal crisis around her failed dreams of becoming a singer, amid the context of a serial killer terrorizing the area.

The cast also includes James Hyndman, David Boutin, Brendan Fletcher, Anne-Marie Cadieux, Fred Ewanuick, Nadia Litz, Gabriel Gascon, Vlasta Vrana, Charlie Rhindress, Marguerite McNeil and Bronwen Mantel in supporting roles.

The film premiered on August 5, 2006, at the Locarno Film Festival, and had its Canadian premiere on August 26 at the Montreal World Film Festival.

Jason Anderson of The Globe and Mail wrote that the film was essentially a pale imitation of a David Adams Richards novel, faring especially poorly in comparison to the 2002 film adaptation of The Bay of Love and Sorrows.

François Laplante received two Jutra Award nominations at the 9th Jutra Awards in 2007, for Best Art Direction and Best Costume Design.
