= James Hyndman (actor) =

Canadian television, film and stage actor

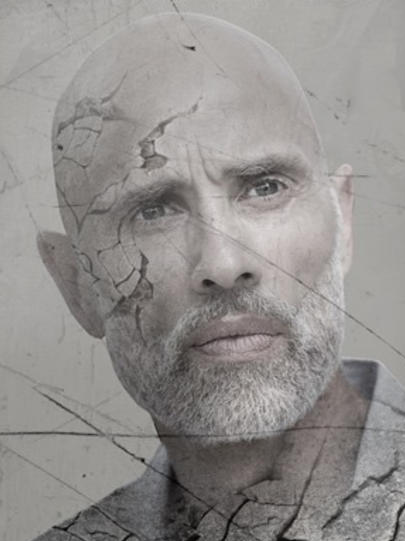
- James Hyndman in character as "Boris", Hyndman's role as seen on the poster of the 2016 film Boris Without Beatrice
- Born: April 23, 1962 (age 64); Bonn, West Germany
- Occupations: Film, television and stage actor

James Hyndman (born April 23, 1962, in Bonn, West Germany) is a Canadian television, film and stage actor. He is best known for his roles in the television series Rumeurs, for which he won a Gémeaux Award for Best Actor in a Comedy Series in 2003, and the film Rowing Through, for which he garnered a Genie Award nomination for Best Supporting Actor at the 17th Genie Awards in 1996.

His other credits have included the films Les Pots cassés, Eldorado, Polygraph, Memories Unlocked (Souvenirs intimes), The Marsh (Le Marais), Black Eyed Dog, Boris Without Béatrice (Boris sans Béatrice), Underground (Souterrain) and The Girl Who Cried Pearls (La jeune fille qui pleurait des perles), and the television series Diva, Les Hauts et les bas de Sophie Paquin, Le cœur a ses raisons and Trauma.
