= The Great Darkened Days =

- Film poster
- French: La grande noirceur
- Directed by: Maxime Giroux
- Written by: Simon Beaulieu; Maxime Giroux; Alexandre Laferrière
- Produced by: Sylvain Corbeil; Nancy Grant
- Starring: Martin Dubreuil; Sarah Gadon
- Cinematography: Sara Mishara
- Edited by: Mathieu Bouchard-Malo
- Music by: Olivier Alary; Johannes Malfatti
- Production company: Metafilms
- Release date: 8 September 2018 (TIFF)
- Running time: 95 minutes
- Country: Canada
- Languages: English; French

The Great Darkened Days (French: La grande noirceur) is a 2018 Canadian drama film, directed by Maxime Giroux. Set during World War II, the film centres on Philippe (Martin Dubreuil), a draft dodger from Quebec who is living as a drifter and Charlie Chaplin impersonator in the United States. Despite its setting, however, the film makes use of some deliberate anachronisms, including a scene where R.E.M.'s contemporary song "Everybody Hurts" plays on the radio.

The film's cast also includes Sarah Gadon, Cody Fern, Luzer Twersky, Romain Duris, Reda Kateb and Lise Roy.

The film premiered at the 2018 Toronto International Film Festival.

== Accolades ==
Award	Date of ceremony	Category	Recipient(s)	Result	Ref(s)
Canadian Screen Awards	31 March 2019	Best Motion Picture	Sylvain Corbeil, Nancy Grant	Nominated	
Canadian Screen Awards	31 March 2019	Best Director	Maxime Giroux	Nominated	
Canadian Screen Awards	31 March 2019	Best Actor	Martin Dubreuil	Nominated	
Canadian Screen Awards	31 March 2019	Best Supporting Actress	Sarah Gadon	Won	
Canadian Screen Awards	31 March 2019	Best Cinematography	Sara Mishara	Won	
Canadian Screen Awards	31 March 2019	Best Art Direction/Production Design	Patricia McNeil	Won	
Canadian Screen Awards	31 March 2019	Best Costume Design	Patricia McNeil	Won	
Canadian Screen Awards	31 March 2019	Best Sound Editing	Frédéric Cloutier	Won	
Prix Iris	2 June 2019	Best Film	Sylvain Corbeil, Nancy Grant	Nominated	
Prix Iris	2 June 2019	Best Director	Maxime Giroux	Nominated	
Prix Iris	2 June 2019	Best Art Direction	Sylvain Dion, Patricia McNeil	Nominated	
Prix Iris	2 June 2019	Best Cinematography	Sara Mishara	Won	
Prix Iris	2 June 2019	Best Sound	Luc Boudrias, Frédéric Cloutier, Stephen De Oliveira	Nominated	
Prix Iris	2 June 2019	Best Editing	Mathieu Bouchard-Malo	Nominated	
Prix Iris	2 June 2019	Best Music	Olivier Alary	Nominated	
Prix Iris	2 June 2019	Best Costumes	Patricia McNeil	Nominated	
