= Sashinka =

- Directed by: Kristina Wagenbauer
- Written by: Kristina Wagenbauer; Marie-Geneviève Simard
- Produced by: Nellie Carrier
- Starring: Carla Turcotte; Natalia Dontcheva
- Cinematography: Marie Davignon
- Edited by: Jules Saulnier
- Music by: Jean-Sébastien Williams
- Production companies: Art & Essai
- Release date: October 13, 2017
- Running time: 78 minutes
- Country: Canada
- Language: French

Sashinka is a Canadian drama film, directed by Kristina Wagenbauer and released in 2018. The film stars Carla Turcotte as Sasha, a musician who is preparing for her band's potential breakthrough concert when her estranged mother Elena (Natalia Dontcheva) shows up on her doorstep.

The film premiered at the Festival du Nouveau Cinéma de Montréal in 2017.

The film received three Canadian Screen Award nominations at the 7th Canadian Screen Awards in 2019, for Best Actress (Turcotte), Best Editing (Jules Saulnier) and Best Original Song (Jean-Sébastien Williams, "Help Is On the Way"). It received three Prix Iris nominations at the 21st Quebec Cinema Awards, for Best Actress (Turcotte), Best Supporting Actress (Dontcheva) and Best Casting (Wagenbauer, Nolwenn Daste, Fanny Rainville).
