= Wild Run: The Legend =

- Film poster
- French: Chasse-Galerie: La Légende
- Directed by: Jean-Philippe Duval
- Written by: Guillaume Vigneault
- Produced by: Christian Larouche; Réal Chabot
- Starring: Caroline Dhavernas; Francis Ducharme; François Papineau; Vincent-Guillaume Otis
- Cinematography: Mario Janelle
- Edited by: Myriam Poirier
- Music by: Jorane
- Production companies: Christal Films; Film du Boulevard
- Release date: 26 February 2016
- Running time: 109 minutes
- Country: Canada
- Language: French
- Budget: $7 million

Wild Run: The Legend (French: Chasse-Galerie: La Légende) is a 2016 Canadian fantasy film directed by Jean-Philippe Duval and starring Caroline Dhavernas, Francis Ducharme and François Papineau. The film's screenplay is written by Guillaume Vigneault, based on the French Canadian legend of Chasse-galerie.

== Plot ==
On New Year's Eve, 1863, Theodore Gilbert meets Jack Murphy, a suave man, while Theodore fears his pregnant wife may die during delivery. Murphy offers a solution, and Theodore dies. In 1888 in L'Ascension, Quebec, lumberjack Jos Lebel is in a romantic relationship with Theodore's grown daughter Liza Gilbert. Jos and a group of lumberjacks then set out to work in the Quebec wilderness. The group is eager to spend the holiday with their loved ones, when they meet Murphy, who is really the Devil. The men make a Faustian deal with Murphy to return home, employing a flying canoe.

== Cast ==
- Caroline Dhavernas as Liza Gilbert
- Francis Ducharme as Joe Lebel
- François Papineau as Jack Murphy
- Vincent-Guillaume Otis as Romain Boisjoli
- Fabien Cloutier as Michael McDuff

== Production ==
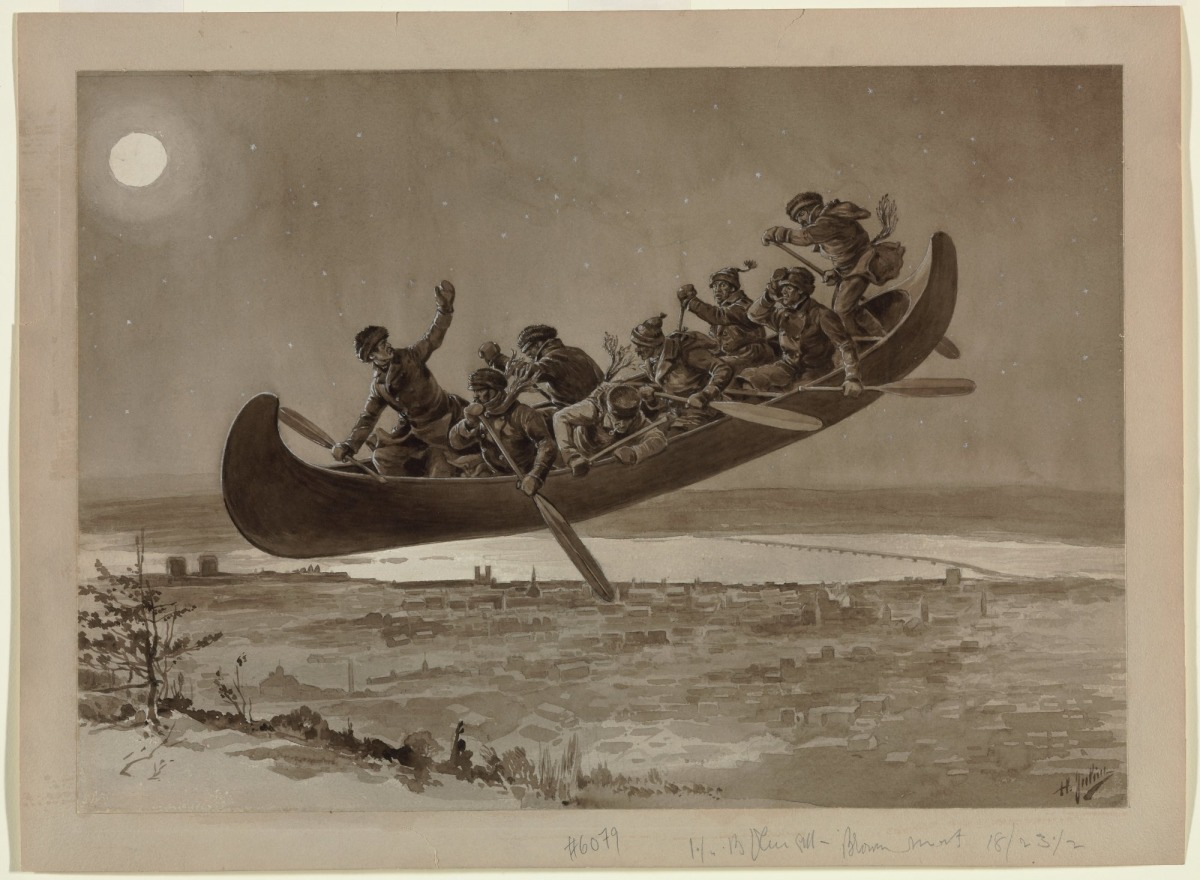
A 1906 depiction of the Chasse-galerie legend by Henri Julien.

The legend of Chasse-galerie was an oral tradition in Quebec for years before Honoré Beaugrand wrote a book on the subject, with Guillaume Vigneault's screenplay marking the first feature film adaptation. Jean-Philippe Duval became the director after agreeing to make a third film, following his Matroni and Me (Matroni et moi) and Through the Mist (Dédé, à travers les brumes). The budget was $7 million.

With a fascination in history, Duval approached the production from a historically realistic perspective, encouraged by the success of the 2015 film The Revenant. Challenges arose in post-production, one of the reasons the planned December 2015 release was cancelled.

== Reception ==
The film was released in Quebec on 26 February 2016. It debuted fourth at the Quebec box office, grossing $140,289 in its first weekend. For Halloween 2016, Alliance Francaise screened Wild Run: The Legend in Toronto. Les Films Séville also released it on DVD on 7 June 2016.

Reviews were generally positive. Brendan Kelly, writing for The Montreal Gazette, gave it two and a half stars, comparing the realism to the TV series Les Pays d'en haut, but said that the depiction of the Devil subtracted from the seriousness. In La Presse, Marc-André Lussier awarded it three and a half stars, saying the realism had great impact and made the winter setting feel real, and crediting Dhavernas and Ducharme for chemistry. Quebec fantasy writer Bryan Perro championed the belated adaptation, saying it was important for contemporary Quebec to reconnect with its heritage. Le Devoir's André Lavoie praised the film's visuals, aside from the fairy tale segments. Isabelle Laramée gave it three stars in Journal Metro, citing the artistic direction and cinematography.

=== Accolades ===
Award	Date of ceremony	Category	Recipient(s)	Result	Ref(s)
Prix Iris	4 June 2017	Best Art Direction	Jean Babin	Nominated	
Prix Iris	4 June 2017	Best Costume Design	Francesca Chamberland	Won	
Prix Iris	4 June 2017	Best Makeup	Nicole Lapierre	Nominated	
Prix Iris	4 June 2017	Best Hairstyling	Marie-France Cardinal and Véronique-Anne Leblan	Nominated	
