= Martin Dubreuil =

Canadian actor and musician from Quebec

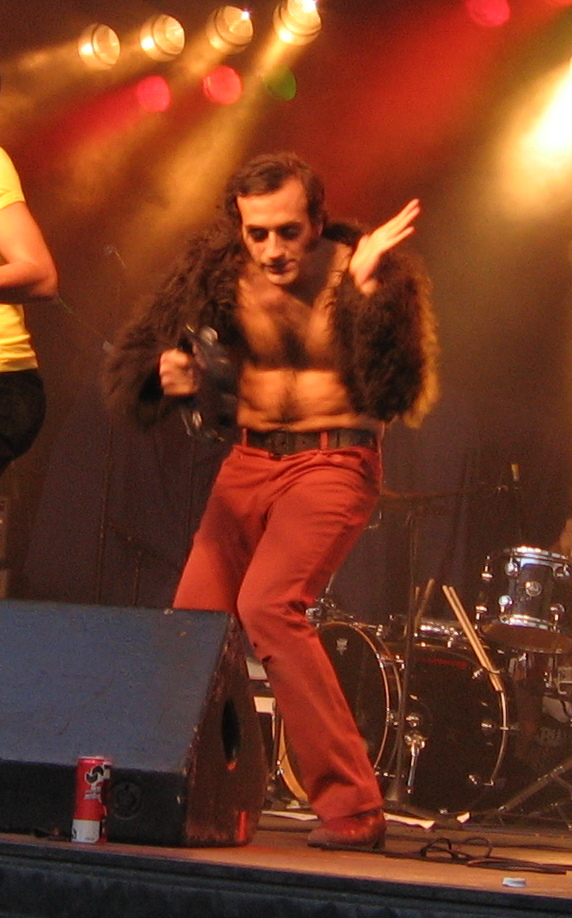
- Born: May 26, 1972 (age 54); Montreal, Quebec
- Occupations: Actor; Musician

Martin Dubreuil (born May 26, 1972) is a Canadian actor and musician from Quebec. He is most noted for his performance in the film For Those Who Don't Read Me (À tous ceux qui ne me lisent pas), for which he won the Prix Iris for Best Actor at the 21st Quebec Cinema Awards in 2019.

He has been a two-time Genie Award and Canadian Screen Award nominee, receiving nods for Best Supporting Actor at the 31st Genie Awards for 10½ and Best Actor at the 7th Canadian Screen Awards in 2019 for The Great Darkened Days (La grande noirceur), and a three-time Jutra/Iris nominee for Best Supporting Actor, with nods at the 13th Jutra Awards in 2011 for 7 Days (Les 7 Jours du Talion), the 19th Quebec Cinema Awards in 2017 for Shambles (Maudite poutine), and the 24th Quebec Cinema Awards in 2022 for Maria Chapdelaine.

As a musician he was a member of the band Les Breastfeeders, in which he used the stage name "Johnny Maldoror".

== Filmography ==
=== Film ===
Year	Title	Role	Notes
1999	Elvis Gratton II: Miracle à Memphis	Père punk Elvis	
1999	Urban Flesh	Kane	
2000	L'Idée noire		
2001	February 15, 1839 (15 février 1839)	François-Xavier Prieur	
2001	Bloody Mess	Poor guy	
2001	Tar Angel (L'Ange de goudron)	Claude	
2003	Evil Words (Sur le seuil)	Édouard Villeneuve	
2003	Corps étrangers	Daniel Fréchette	
2004	Elvis Gratton 3: Le Retour d'Elvis Wong	Technician	
2005	Le facteur poulpe	Man	
2005	Radio	Tom	
2005	Red (Le rouge au sol)	Christian	
2006	Petit dimanche	Martin	
2006	Clean	Bill	
2007	Quelque chose dans l'air	Martin	
2007	The 3 L'il Pigs (Les 3 p'tits cochons)	Deliveryman	
2007	Il faut que je parle à mon père	David	
2008	Everything Is Fine (Tout est parfait)	Réal	
2008	The Broken Line (La ligne brisée)	Client	
2008	Tomorrow (Demain)	Marcoux	
2009	Free Fall (Les pieds dans le vide)		
2009	The Dark Room (La chambre noire)	Security guard	
2010	7 Days (Les 7 jours du talion)	Anthony Lemaire	
2010	10½	Luc Lebeau	
2010	Sad Day (Jour sans joie)		
2010	La pilule		
2010	The Hair of the Beast (Le poil de la bête)	Légaré	
2010	Twice a Woman (Deux fois une femme)	Worker	
2010	Au milieu de nulle part ailleurs		
2011	Ce n'est rien		
2011	Gerry	Pierre Huet	
2011	La Run	The Rat	
2011	Fall, Finally (Enfin l'automne)	Sophie's boyfriend	
2012	L'Affaire Dumont	Paul Gélinas	
2012	Surveillant		
2012	Tabula Rasa	Fernand	
2013	Hunting the Northern Godard (La Chasse au Godard d'Abbittibbi)	Paul	
2013	Summer Crisis (La maison du pêcheur)	Le Zoo	
2013	Head Down (La tête en bas)		
2013	Riptide (Ressac)	Philippe	
2014	Felix and Meira (Félix et Meira)	Felix	
2014	Bunker	Tremblay	
2014	Tentacules 8, le retour de la chose		
2014	The Wolves (Les loups)	Maxime	
2015	Dogs Don't Breed Cats (Les chiens ne font pas les chats)	Jeff	
2015	Chelem	Borracho	
2015	Jusqu'à plus soif		
2016	Before the Streets (Avant les rues)	Thomas Dugré	
2016	Lost Face	Subienkow	
2016	Desert Cry (Déserts)	Marc's friend	
2016	Shambles (Maudite poutine)	Michel	
2017	Father and Guns 2 (De père en flic 2)	Édouard Lemire	
2017	Vieux jeu	Bernard	
2018	The Great Darkened Days (La grande noirceur)	Philippe	
2018	For Those Who Don't Read Me (À tous ceux qui ne me lisent pas)	Yves Boisvert	
2018	Night for Day	Marc	
2018	Heartburn		
2019	On the Other Side of the Well	Father	
2019	Be Yourself	Jacques	
2020	Flashwood	Marc	
2021	Maria Chapdelaine	Edwige Légaré	
2021	Heirdoms (Soumissions)	Joseph	
2021	La Contemplation du mystère		
2021	Cerceuil, tabarnak!	Editor in chief	
2021	Inès	Chaman	
2022	Montreal Girls	Wiseman	
2022	Promenades nocturnes	Jef	
2022	Joli jour		
2023	A Respectable Woman (Une femme respectable)	Paul-Émile Lemay	
2023	One Summer (Le temps d'un été)	Sam	
2023	The Eighth Floor (Le huitième étage, jours de révolte)	Jacques Lanctôt	
2023	Echo to Delta (Écho à Delta)	Steve	
2023	Kanaval	Albert	
2024	Ababooned (Ababouiné)	André Rochette	

=== Television ===
Year	Title	Role	Notes
2022	Motel Paradis	Patrick Nelson	
