= Harry Standjofski =

Canadian actor (1959–2025)

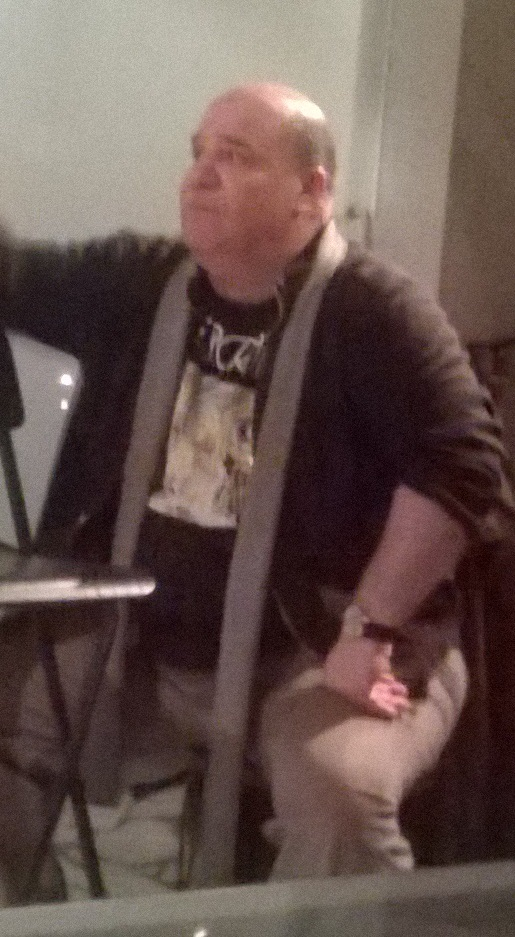
- Standjofski in 2019
- Born: May 22, 1959; Montreal, Quebec, Canada
- Died: July 18, 2025 (aged 66); Montreal, Quebec, Canada
- Occupations: Actor; playwright
- Years active: 1982–2025

Theoharis Alexandros "Harry" Standjofski (May 22, 1959 – July 18, 2025) was a Canadian actor and playwright. He appeared in films such as Guy X, The Aviator, Protection, X-Men: Days of Future Past and Hidden Agenda and voiced characters in video games such as Assassin's Creed, Prince of Persia: The Two Thrones, Splinter Cell: Chaos Theory, and Splinter Cell.

His plays Anton and No Cycle can be found in his book Urban Myths published by NuAge Editions. Standjofski taught theatre part-time at Concordia University, which he attended, beginning in 1986.

Standjofski died on July 18, 2025, at the age of 66.

== Filmography ==
=== Film roles ===
- Wild Thing (1987) – Sgt. Matty
- Ford: The Man and the Machine (1987, TV Movie) – Saboteur
- Falling Over Backwards (1990) – Club manager
- Moody Beach (1990) – Douanier
- Love and Human Remains (1993)
- The Neighbor (1993) – Morrie
- Mrs. Parker and the Vicious Circle (1994) – Home Movie Director
- Warriors (1994) – Chandler
- The Wrong Woman (1995) – Dept. Store Security Guard
- The Sleep Room (1998) – Stumpel
- Stardom (2000) – IMDb
- Artificial Lies (2000) – Detective Sgt. Joe Collins
- Café Olé (2000)
- Cause of Death (2001) – Dr. Earl Waxman
- Hidden Agenda (2001) – Kevin
- Protection (2001) – Angelo
- The Aviator (2004) – Crony of Louis B. Mayer
- Guy X (2005) – Chaplain Brank
- A Sentimental Capitalism (2008)
- Barney's Version (2010) – Dr. Morty
- Rose and Violet (2011, Short) – Igor
- The Young and Prodigious T.S. Spivet (2013) – Policeman
- X-Men: Days of Future Past (2014) – Groundskeeper
- Le Militaire (2014) – The barber
- The Voice (2015) – The Boss
- The Walk (2015) – Dock Foreman
- Where Atilla Passes (2015) – Restaurant owner
- Playmobil: The Movie (2019) – Security Guard
- Beau Is Afraid (2023) – Superintendent / Catering Manager
- Family Pack (2024) – Gilbert

=== Television roles ===
- Urban Angel (1991) – Lou-Barman
- Are You Afraid of the Dark? (1993–1999) – Phil / Mr. Kristoph
- Big Wolf on Campus (1999) – Soul Sucker

=== Animation roles ===
- A Bunch of Munsch (1991–1992) – Additional Voices
- Young Robin Hood (1991–1992) – Brother Tuck
- Arthur (1996) - Uncle Bud
- The Country Mouse and the City Mouse Adventures (1997–1998) – Additional Voices
- Ripley's Believe It or Not! (1999) – Additional Voices
- Mumble Bumble (1999) – Narrator
- Rotten Ralph (1999–2001) – Naughty Nathan
- Arthur's Perfect Christmas (2000, TV Movie) – Uncle Fred
- Pig City (2002) – V.P. Larden
- The Lost World (2003) – (English version)
- The Tofus (2004–2007) – Tidus Hubbub
- Tripping the Rift (2004–2007) – Additional Voice
- Tupu (2005)
- Winx Club (Cinélume's dub) 2005–2007) – Darkar / Avalon
- Yakari (2005–2014)
- Dragon Hunters (2006) – Lian-Chu
- The Girl Who Hated Books (2006) – Aardvark
- Gofrette (2007)
- Supernatural: The Anime Series (2011) – Bobby Singer (English version)
- Pinocchio (2012) – The Crow / The Green Fisherman (English version)
- The Legend of Sarila (2013) – Uliak

=== Video game roles ===
- Jagged Alliance 2 (1999)
- Wizardry 8 (2001)
- Evolution Worlds (2002) – Cortez / Edmund / Society Clerk
- Rainbow Six: Vegas 2 (2004) – Six
- Still Life (2005) – Vaclav Kolar / Otokar Kubina
- Prince of Persia: The Two Thrones (2005) – The Vizier / Zurvan
- Assassin's Creed (2007) – William of Montferrat
- Assassin's Creed II (2009) – Silvio Barbarigo Il Rosso
- Assassin's Creed: Brotherhood (2010) – Juan Borgia the Elder
- Assassin's Creed: Ascendance (2010) – Juan Borgia / Oliverotto da Fermo
- Deus Ex: Human Revolution (2011) – Lazarus / Grayson
- Assassin's Creed Rogue (2014) – Lawrence Washington
- Assassin's Creed Unity (2014) – Honoré Gabriel Riqueti, comte de Mirabeau
- Deus Ex: Mankind Divided (2016) – Lazarus
