= Natalia Dontcheva =

Bulgarian actress (1969–2026)

- Наталия Дончева
- Born: 31 December 1969; Sofia, Bulgaria
- Died: 1 August 2026 (aged 56)
- Occupation: Actress
- Known for: Performances as Madame de Joncquières in Lady J and as Elena in Sashinka

Natalia Dontcheva (Bulgarian: Наталия Дончева; 31 December 1969 – 1 August 2026) was a Bulgarian actress based in France. She is best known to international audiences for her performances as Madame de Joncquières in Lady J (Mademoiselle de Joncquières), and as Elena in Sashinka.

== Life and career ==
Born on 31 December 1969 in Sofia, she was the daughter of actor Plamen Donchev.

For Sashinka, she received a Prix Iris nomination for Best Supporting Actress at the 21st Quebec Cinema Awards in 2019.

Dontcheva died on 1 August 2026, at the age of 56.

== Filmography ==
=== Film ===
- 1987: Voyage dans le temps – Antonia
- 1989: Rio Adio (Adieu Rio) – fille de Vera
- 1999: Le Voyage à Paris – Natalia
- 2003: Mauvais Esprit – La nounou
- 2006: Un an – Victoire
- 2006: Premonition (Le Pressentiment) – Helena Jozic
- 2009: Le Siffleur – La traductrice russe
- 2009: A Man and His Dog (Un homme et son chien) – la guichetière SNCF
- 2010: Coursier – Iris
- 2018: Lady J (Mademoiselle de Joncquières) – Madame de Joncquières
- 2018: Sashinka – Elena

=== Television ===
- 2019: Infidèle – Ingrid
