= Collège Lionel-Groulx =

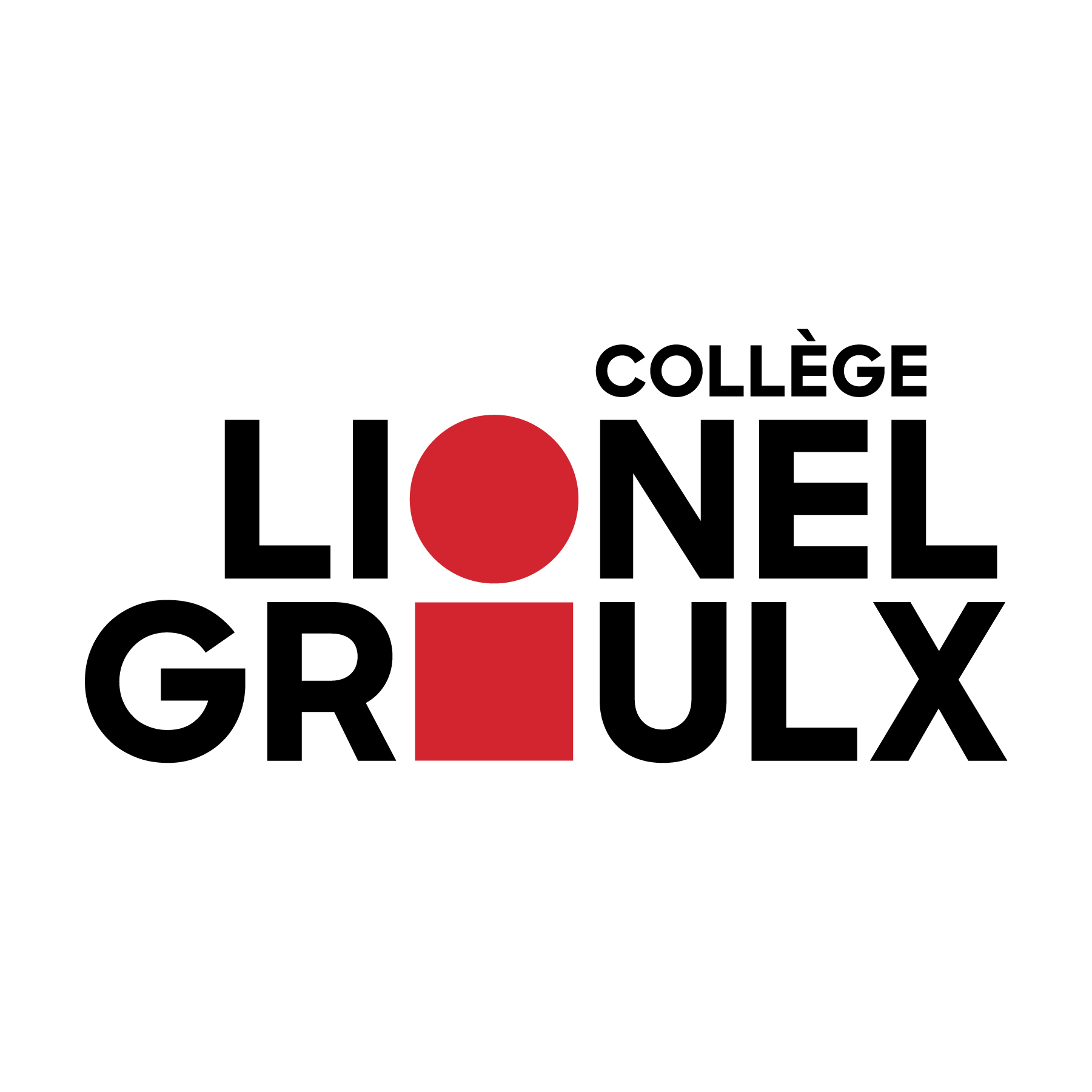

Location
- 100, rue Duquet; Sainte-Thérèse, Québec; Canada

Information
- Established: 1967
- Language: French
- Website: www.clg.qc.ca

Collège Lionel-Groulx is a general and professional education college (CEGEP) located in Sainte-Thérèse, Quebec, Canada. This college has around 6,000 students in regular training and around 2,000 in continuing education.

== Founding ==
The college was established on September 14, 1967, and named in honor of the Quebec historian, Canon Lionel Groulx, former student of the Séminaire de Sainte-Thérèse. Its foundation comes from the Sainte-Rose Business School, the Saint-Jérôme Normal School and the Seminary of Sainte-Thérèse. The first three programs to be authorized are computer science, administrative techniques and documentation techniques. In 1969, the college acquired all the movable and immovable property of Séminaire de Sainte-Thérèse.

The college's main facility occupies 1.8 million square feet of land. The college also has a sports center, a building complex made up of traditional residences and apartments capable of accommodating 280 students, a computer pavilion, as well as a college technology transfer center (college center for technology transfer). innovation in microelectronics from Quebec), a theater pavilion, a music pavilion, a science pavilion, a performance hall, an agricultural training center and horticulture greenhouses in Mirabel.

== History ==
On October 8, 1968, a strike began for the first time in a CEGEP. This event will act as the spearhead of the student mobilizations of October 1968.

== General directors ==
- Charles Valois (1967–1973)
- Desgroseilliers Pierre (1973–1978)
- Nicole Brodeur (1978–1981)
- Jean Ladouceur (1981–1984)
- André Turcotte (1987–1991)
- Marie-Hélène Desrosiers (1991–1995)
- Francine Sénecal (1995–2002)
- Monique Laurin (2002–2013)
- Michel-Louis Beauchamp (2013–2023)
- Philippe Nasr (2023- )

== Notable teachers ==
- André G. Bourassa
- Élie Fallu
- Jean-Claude St-Onge
- Johanne Fontaine
- Suzanne Garceau
- Marie-France Marcotte
- Catherine Bégin
- Luc Bourgeois
- Daniel Paquette
- Alice Ronfard
- Frédéric Dubois
- Claude Poissant
- France Boisvert
- Agnès Grimaud

== Notable alumni ==
- Normand Brathwaite
- Francis Ducharme
- Patrice L'Écuyer
- Pauline Martin
- Les Denis Drolet
- Hélène Bourgeois Leclerc
- France D'Amour
- Geneviève Néron
- Mélanie Pilon
- Charline Labonté
- Jacques Nantel
- Marie-Chantal Perron
- Martin Laroche
- Marianne Moisan
- Guy Jodoin
- Francis Ducharme
- Sophie Desmarais
- Francis Reddy
- Frédérique Dufort

== Student association ==
The Association générale des étudiantes et étudiants du Collège Lionel-Groulx (AGEECLG) is the student association of the student community of Collège Lionel-Groulx. This association is a member of Association pour une solidarité syndicale étudiante (ASSÉ).

== Athletics ==
The Collège Lionel-Groulx sports teams are named “Nordiques”.

== See also ==
- Liste des cégeps du Québec
- Séminaire de Sainte-Thérèse
