= Whitney Lafleur =

Canadian actress

Whitney Lafleur is a Canadian actress from Rouyn-Noranda, Quebec. She is most noted for her performance in the 2016 film Split (Écartée), for which she received a Prix Iris nomination for Revelation of the Year at the 19th Quebec Cinema Awards in 2017.

In 2020 she appeared in Ariane Louis-Seize's short film Shooting Star (Comme une comète). In 2022 she appeared in Joëlle Desjardins Paquette's feature film Rodeo (Rodéo).
