= Before the Streets =

2016 film directed by Chloé Leriche

- French: Avant les rues
- Directed by: Chloé Leriche
- Produced by: Chloé Leriche
- Starring: Rykko Bellemare; Kwena Bellemare-Boivin; Jacques Newashish
- Cinematography: Glauco Bermudez
- Edited by: Chloé Leriche
- Music by: Robert Marcel Lepage
- Production companies: Les films de l'autre Telefilm Canada
- Distributed by: Funfilm Distribution
- Release dates: February 18, 2016 (Berlinale); April 15, 2016
- Running time: 97 minutes
- Country: Canada
- Language: Atikamekw

Before the Streets (French: Avant les rues) is a 2016 Canadian drama film directed by Chloé Leriche. Set among the Atikamekw people of northern Quebec, the film stars Rykko Bellemare as Shawnouk, a man undertaking the process of restorative justice after accidentally killing someone in the process of committing a crime.

The film's cast also includes Martin Dubreuil, Kwena Bellemare-Boivin and Jacques Newashish.

== Accolades ==
The film won the award for best picture, and Leriche won the award for best director, at the 2016 Whistler Film Festival. At the 2016 Directors Guild of Canada awards, Leriche won the DGC Discovery Award.

The film garnered six nominations at the 5th Canadian Screen Awards in 2017, including Best Motion Picture.

Award	Date of ceremony	Category	Recipient(s)	Result	Ref(s)
Canadian Screen Awards	12 March 2017	Best Motion Picture	Chloé Leriche	Nominated	
Canadian Screen Awards	12 March 2017	Best Director	Chloé Leriche	Nominated	
Canadian Screen Awards	12 March 2017	Best Supporting Actor	Jacques Newashish	Nominated	
Canadian Screen Awards	12 March 2017	Best Supporting Actress	Kwena Bellemare-Boivin	Nominated	
Canadian Screen Awards	12 March 2017	Best Cinematography	Glauco Bermudez	Nominated	
Canadian Screen Awards	12 March 2017	Best Original Song	Nikan Boivin for "Sokecimyekw"	Nominated	
Directors Guild of Canada	22 October 2016	DGC Discovery Award	Chloé Leriche	Won	
Prix collégial du cinéma québécois	2017	Best Film	Before the Streets	Nominated	
Prix Iris	4 June 2017	Best Film	Chloé Leriche	Nominated	
Prix Iris	4 June 2017	Best Director	Chloé Leriche	Nominated	
Prix Iris	4 June 2017	Best Screenplay	Chloé Leriche	Nominated	
Prix Iris	4 June 2017	Revelation of the Year	Rykko Bellemare	Won	
Prix Iris	4 June 2017	Best Cinematography	Glauco Bermudez	Nominated	
Prix Iris	4 June 2017	Best Sound	Sylvain Bellemare, Stéphane Bergeron and Martyne Morin	Nominated	
Prix Iris	4 June 2017	Best Editing	Chloé Leriche	Nominated	
Prix Iris	4 June 2017	Best Original Music	Robert Marcel Lepage	Nominated	
Whistler Film Festival	2016	Best Canadian Feature Film	Chloé Leriche	Won	
Whistler Film Festival	2016	Best Director	Chloé Leriche	Won	
