= Boris Without Béatrice =

2016 film

- Film poster
- French: Boris sans Béatrice
- Directed by: Denis Côté
- Written by: Denis Côté
- Produced by: Sylvain Corbeil; Nancy Grant
- Starring: James Hyndman; Simone-Élise Girard; Denis Lavant
- Cinematography: Jessica Lee Gagné
- Edited by: Nicolas Roy
- Music by: Ghislain Poirier
- Production company: Metafilms
- Distributed by: K-Films America
- Release dates: 12 February 2016 (Berlin); 4 March 2016 (Canada)
- Running time: 93 minutes
- Country: Canada
- Language: French

Boris Without Béatrice (French: Boris sans Béatrice) is a 2016 Canadian drama film written and directed by Denis Côté. Starring James Hyndman, Simone-Élise Girard and Denis Lavant, the film follows a wealthy entrepreneur and his bedridden wife. It was selected for Competition at the 66th Berlin International Film Festival, where it had its world premiere.

== Synopsis ==
Boris Malinovsky is a wealthy entrepreneur whose wife, Béatrice, a government minister, has become bedridden after a nervous breakdown. During Béatrice’s illness, Boris has affairs with Helga and with her caretaker Klara. After meeting a mysterious stranger, Boris is told that he may be responsible for Béatrice’s condition.

== Cast ==
The cast includes:

- James Hyndman as Boris
- Simone-Élise Girard as Beatrice
- Denis Lavant as a mysterious stranger
- Dounia Sichov as Helga
- Isolda Dychauk as Klara

== Production ==
The film was produced by Metafilms, with financial participation from Telefilm Canada and SODEC. It was written and directed by Denis Côté. Filming took place from 22 July to 24 August 2015 in the Montreal region and the Eastern Townships.

== Release ==
The film was selected for Competition at the 66th Berlin International Film Festival, where it had its world premiere in February 2016. It had its Quebec premiere at the Rendez-vous du cinéma québécois on 18 February 2016, and was released theatrically in Quebec on 4 March 2016. It was later released on DVD by K-Films America on 14 June 2016.

== Reception ==
=== Critical response ===
Guy Lodge of Variety described the film as a "brittle, no-joke comedy of unchecked privilege". He wrote that although the film withheld moral judgment from its characters, its portrait of Boris remained difficult to engage with because of the character’s rigidity and the low stakes of his story.

David Rooney of The Hollywood Reporter described it as a "painfully mannered fable" about entitlement, wealth and complacency. He praised James Hyndman’s performance and the film’s visual elegance, but wrote that it was "a laborious film that dulls the human drama at its core".

The New York Times wrote that the film appeared to address "the hubris of the modern business tycoon", but found that it "never coalesces into more than a self-amused goof".

=== Awards and nominations ===
Award	Date of ceremony	Category	Recipient(s)	Result	Ref(s)
Prix Iris	June 4, 2017	Best Costume Design	Caroline Bodson	Nominated	
Prix Iris	June 4, 2017	Most Successful Film Outside Quebec	Boris Without Béatrice	Nominated	
