= Caroline Bodson =

Canadian costume designer

Caroline Bodson is a Canadian costume designer.

She is a four-time Prix Iris nominee for Best Costume Design, receiving nominations at the 16th Jutra Awards in 2014 for Hunting the Northern Godard (Chasse au Godard d'Abbittibbi), the 19th Quebec Cinema Awards in 2017 for Boris Without Béatrice (Boris sans Béatrice), the 21st Quebec Cinema Awards in 2019 for Ghost Town Anthology (Répertoire des villes disparues), and the 23rd Quebec Cinema Awards in 2021 for Underground (Souterrain).
