= Sticky Fingers (2009 film) =

- DVD Cover
- Directed by: Ken Scott
- Written by: Ken Scott
- Produced by: André Rouleau
- Starring: Roy Dupuis; Patrice Robitaille; Aure Atika
- Cinematography: Allen Smith
- Edited by: Monica Coleman
- Music by: Nicolas Errèra
- Production companies: Caramel Films; Area 54 Films
- Distributed by: Alliance Films
- Release date: August 8, 2009
- Running time: 108 minutes
- Country: Canada
- Language: French

Sticky Fingers (French: Les Doigts croches) is a 2009 Canadian film written and directed by Ken Scott.

== Plot ==
In 1964, Donald Quintal (Patrice Robitaille) meets Father Padre Carmet (Jorge Sabate) and recounts his story.

He had belonged to The Panet Street Gang, a group of six Montreal gangsters. While they were in prison, they planned a bank heist. When the heist went awry, they all voted to give Jimmy the $2 million from the heist, seeing as he had devoted his life to God, on the condition of promising to share it when they all met again.

Jimmy hid under the floor while the other five were taken away. When the five were released from prison, they met at a parish chapel near the Franco-Spanish border. Donald explained to the group that he had received a letter from Jimmy that they were to walk 830 km of the Camino pilgrimage to Santiago to get their share of the money, with a condition, that they needed to prove that they had changed their character as proof of doing the pilgrimage.

They learn that they need pilgrim passports to be able to stay at hostels along the way. They tell the Customs women the truth about themselves and they get their passes. Donald Quintal begins a relationship with Maddy (Aure Atika), the girlfriend of Charles (Roy Dupuis) the de facto leader of the group.

They arrive in a village and are directed by a boy on his bike to a church and find the grave marker of Jimmy, who had died of his heroin addiction while staying at Carmet's missionary while the others were incarcerated.

Cutting back to the conversation between Quintal and Carmet, Quintal is given the money by being given the location of where it is buried. The gang is arrested in Santiago and while the police are going through their bags looking for the money, it is shown that Maddy has it. The members leave prison and get back to their lives.

Maddy distributes the money to each member as she sees fit, leaving Charles a plane ticket to come and find her in Venice.

== Cast ==
- Patrice Robitaille as Donald Quintal
- Jorge Sabate as Father Padre Carmet
- Roy Dupuis as Charles Favreau
- Aure Atika as Maddy
- Gabriel Sabourin as Jimmy
- Jean-Pierre Bergeron as Isidore
- Andrea Bonelli as Passport Agent
- Harry Havilio as Old Man
- Claude Legault as Conrad
- Paolo Noël as Eddy
- Donny Quinn as Police officer (as Donny Falsetti)

== Critical response ==
Brendan Kelly of the Montreal Gazette wrote that "this wry tale of five rather hapless crooks on a pilgrimage in Spain in the mid-1960s is often very funny, never predictable and, in the end, quite touching. The first half-hour is a tad hyper and unfocused but once Scott settles things down, it turns into an appealing little road movie that is refreshingly different from most recent local flicks. "

== Awards ==
Award	Year	Category	Recipient	Result	Ref(s)
Genie Awards	2010	Best Cinematography	Allen Smith	Nominated	
Jutra Awards	2010	Best Screenplay	Ken Scott	Nominated	
Jutra Awards	2010	Best Art Direction	Danielle Labrie	Nominated	
Jutra Awards	2010	Best Costume Design	Ginette Magny	Nominated	
