= Karina Aktouf =

Algerian Canadian actress

- Occupation: Actress
- Known for: Prix Iris nomination for Best Actress
- Notable work: Montreal, White City

Karina Aktouf is an Algerian Canadian actress. She is most noted for her role in the film Montreal, White City (Montréal la blanche), for which she garnered a nomination for Best Actress at the 19th Quebec Cinema Awards in 2017.

She also appeared in the television series Les héritiers Duval, Jasmine, Ramdam and Med, and the film Mon ami Walid.
