= Detour (2009 Canadian film) =

2009 Canadian film directed by Sylvain Guy

- French: Détour
- Directed by: Sylvain Guy
- Written by: Sylvain Guy
- Produced by: Marcel Giroux; Sam Grana; Christian Larouche
- Starring: Luc Picard; Isabelle Guérard; Guillaume Lemay-Thivierge
- Cinematography: Nathalie Moliavko-Visotzky
- Edited by: Jean-François Bergeron
- Music by: Jorane
- Production companies: GPA Films; Grana Productions
- Distributed by: Les Films Séville
- Release date: September 18, 2009
- Running time: 95 minutes
- Country: Canada
- Language: French

Detour (French: Détour) is a Canadian thriller film, directed by Sylvain Guy and released in 2009. The film stars Luc Picard as Léo Huff, an assistant to a wealthy businesswoman who is travelling to Le Bic, Quebec to attend a meeting on his employer's proposal to build a tourist attraction in Bic National Park. There he meets Lou (Isabelle Guérard), a young woman who needs his help liberating herself from her abusive boyfriend Roch (Guillaume Lemay-Thivierge).

The film opened commercially on September 18, 2009.

Guérard received a Jutra Award nomination for Best Actress at the 12th Jutra Awards in 2010.

== Cast ==
- Luc Picard as Léo Huff
- Isabelle Guérard as Lou
- Guillaume Lemay-Thivierge as Roch
- Suzanne Champagne as Maryse Huff
- Sylvie Boucher as Lyne Ventura
- Louison Danis as Mayoress Pauline Courchesne
