= David Uloth =

David Uloth is a Canadian film director and screenwriter from Quebec, most noted for his 2018 film The Far Shore (Dérive).

The brother of filmmaker Geoffrey Uloth and actress Holly Uloth, he was educated at Concordia University. He directed a number of short films in his early career, most notably The Voice (La voce), which was a Prix Iris nominee for Best Live Action Short Film at the 19th Quebec Cinema Awards in 2017.

The Far Shore, his feature debut, was written by his wife, filmmaker Chloé Cinq-Mars. Fluently bilingual, Uloth has worked on both English-language and French-language productions.
