= Henri Picard (actor) =

Canadian actor

Henri Picard, sometimes credited as Henri Richer-Picard, is a Canadian actor from Quebec. He is most noted for his supporting role as Marc in the film For Those Who Don't Read Me (À tous ceux qui ne me lisent pas), for which he was a Prix Iris nominee for Best Supporting Actor at the 21st Quebec Cinema Awards in 2019.

The son of actors Luc Picard and Isabel Richer, he has also appeared in the television series Trauma, Jenny, Cerebrum, District 31, Chaos and Toute la vie, and the films Audition (L'Audition), Ésimésac, Cross My Heart (Les Rois mongols), My Boy (Mon Boy), Mafia Inc., Maria Chapdelaine, Victoire (La Cordonnière), Youngblood and Redemptions (Rédemptions).

In 2023 he starred in The Dishwasher (Le Plongeur), his first leading role in a feature film, for which he received a Prix Iris nomination for Best Actor at the 25th Quebec Cinema Awards.
