= Madeleine Tremblay =

Canadian costume designer

Madeleine Tremblay is a Canadian costume designer from Quebec. She is most noted as a three-time Prix Iris nominee for Best Costume Design, receiving nods at the 16th Jutra Awards in 2014 for The Storm Within (Rouge sang), the 19th Quebec Cinema Awards in 2017 for Kiss Me Like a Lover (Embrasse-moi comme tu m'aimes), and at the 26th Quebec Cinema Awards in 2024 for Ababooned (Ababouiné).
