= Francis Ducharme =

Canadian actor and dancer (born 1981)

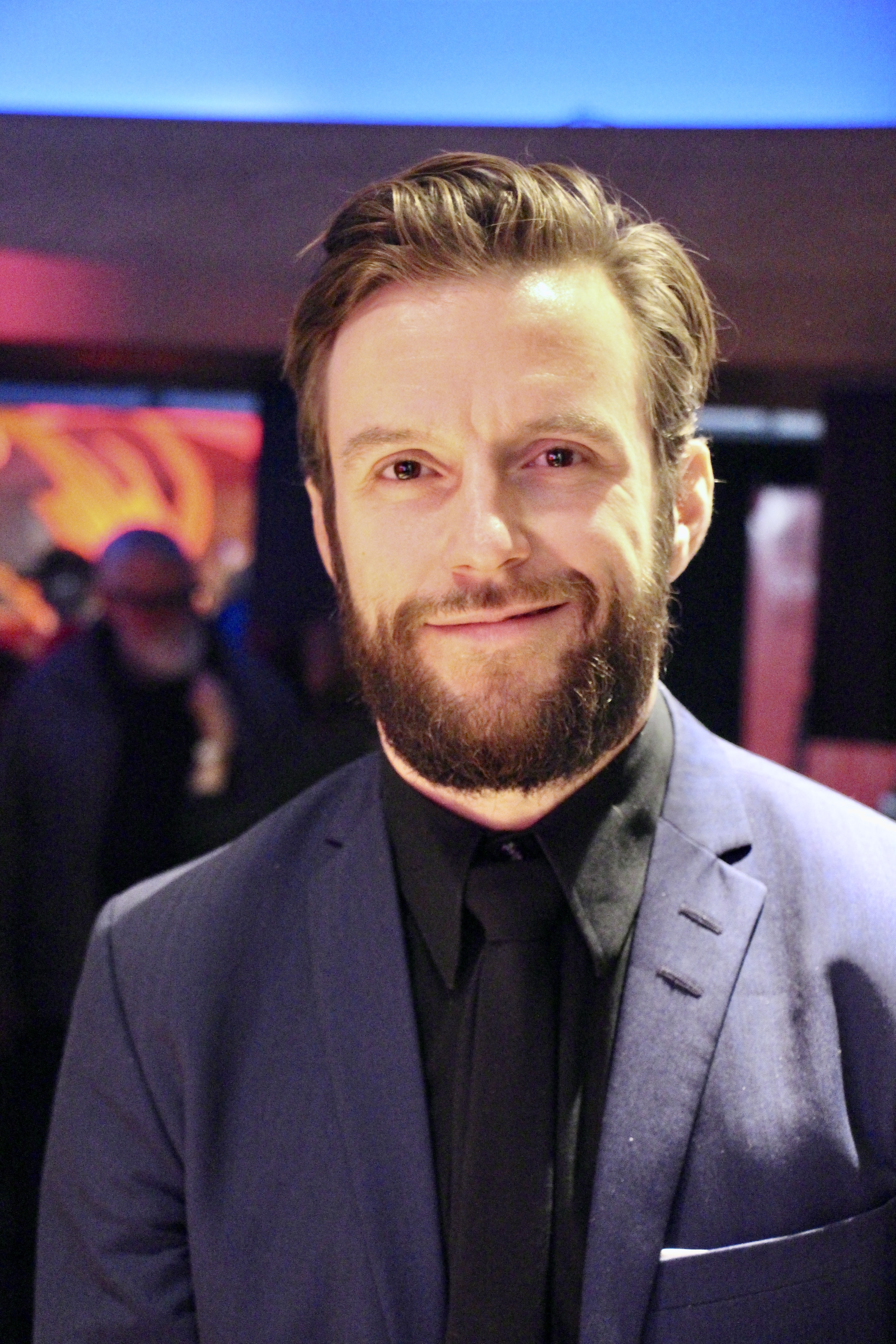
- Ducharme in 2023
- Born: 1981 (age 44–45); Rouyn-Noranda, Quebec, Canada
- Occupations: Actor; dancer

Francis Ducharme (born 1981) is a Canadian actor and dancer, first known for his role in the 2005 coming-of-age film C.R.A.Z.Y.

== Early life and career ==
Ducharme was born in Rouyn-Noranda, Quebec, in 1981. His parents separated when he was four years old and his mother moved to Quebec City. Ducharme split his time between Rouyn-Noranda and Quebec, returning to live with his father, who worked as a waiter, for two years during his high school years. Just after graduation, Ducharme was accepted into an acting program at Collège Lionel-Groulx and also developed a passion for dancing, working with renowned choreographers, including Sidi Larbi Cherkaoui. Following his graduation in theatre in 2002, Ducharme began a stage career, appearing in venues like Théâtre d'Aujourd'hui and Théâtre du Nouveau Monde in Montreal.

His breakthrough role in Quebecois cinema came in 2004 with the film The Five of Us and rose to more prominence the next year with the film C.R.A.Z.Y., which gained critical acclaim. In 2009, Ducharme took over a role in The Master Key, a fantasy thriller film by Patrice Sauvé and had a minor participation in Xavier Dolan's breakthrough work as a filmmaker in I Killed My Mother. Other roles in Canadian cinema include Vital Signs, Corbo, Endorphine, Wild Run: The Legend, Nelly and Tell Me Why These Things Are So Beautiful. In television, Ducharme made his debut in 2002 in the children and youth series Watatatow.

== Personal life ==
In February 2021, La Presse interviewed several actors in Quebec asking about what they thought of straight men playing the characters of gay men in film and TV series, citing the example of Pillow Talk, where the two gay protagonists are interpreted by heterosexual actors Simon Pigeon and Antoine Pilon. Ducharme stated that he is not an activist for "rigid laws about who can play what." However, he added that it is not right that gay actors are not allowed to portray heterosexual roles and urged addressing the elephant in the room.

Ducharme did not make a public coming out, but it became known over time that he is gay. In 2021, Ducharme said that he thought that he was alone in the world when he finished theatre school in the early 2000s, adding that on the set of C.R.A.Z.Y. he overheard a homophobic comment by a technician, which made him decide to continue hiding his sexual orientation.
