= Ginette Magny =

Canadian costume designer

Ginette Magny is a Canadian costume designer from Quebec. She is most noted for her work on the film C.R.A.Z.Y., for which she won both the Genie Award for Best Costume Design and the Jutra Award for Best Costume Design in 2006.

== Awards ==
Award	Date	Category	Work	Result	Ref(s)
Genie Awards	2006	Best Costume Design	C.R.A.Z.Y.	Won	
Genie Awards	2012	Best Costume Design	Café de Flore with Emmanuelle Youchnovski	Nominated	
Quebec Cinema Awards	2006	Best Costume Design	C.R.A.Z.Y.	Won	
Quebec Cinema Awards	2006	Best Costume Design	Les Boys IV	Nominated	
Quebec Cinema Awards	2007	Best Costume Design	A Family Secret (Le secret de ma mère)	Nominated	
Quebec Cinema Awards	2008	Best Costume Design	Surviving My Mother (Comment survivre à sa mère)	Nominated	
Quebec Cinema Awards	2009	Best Costume Design	Le Banquet	Nominated	
Quebec Cinema Awards	2010	Best Costume Design	Sticky Fingers (Les doigts croches)	Nominated	
Quebec Cinema Awards	2012	Best Costume Design	A Life Begins (Une vie qui commence)	Nominated	
Quebec Cinema Awards	2016	Best Costume Design	Elephant Song	Nominated	
Quebec Cinema Awards	2020	Best Costume Design	Jouliks	Nominated	
Quebec Cinema Awards	2022	Best Costume Design	Aline with Camille Janbon, Catherine Leterrier	Nominated	
