= Maïna Militza =

Canadian make-up artist

- Occupation: Make-up artist
- Organization(s): Folio Montreal, B Agency
- Awards: Canadian Screen Award for Best Make-Up
- Website: www.mainamilitza.com

Maïna Militza is a Canadian make-up artist. She is known for working with filmmaker Xavier Dolan.

Militza is affiliated with the agency Folio Montreal and B Agency Paris. She worked for Dolan on the 2014 film Mommy, for which she won the Canadian Screen Award for Best Makeup. With Denis Vidal, Militza worked on the make-up for Dolan's 2016 film It's Only the End of the World, and shared the Canadian Screen Award with hair stylist Denis Vidal. In April 2017, she also received a Prix Iris nomination for Best Make-Up for It's Only the End of the World. In 2018 she worked with American rapper Tierra Whack for her 15 min. short film “Whack World” . The same year she was doing makeup and hair on Billy Eilish in her music video “Hostage . Since then she’s working with various international artists, directors, musicians and actress and her work has been published in prestigious magaziner like Vogue, Numero, ID, Harper's Bazaar, Dazed, Wonderland and Nylon to name a few. In september 2024 she was nominated for makeup-artist of the year at the CAFA awards. She is now based in Paris.
