= Patricia McNeil =

Canadian costume designer and production designer

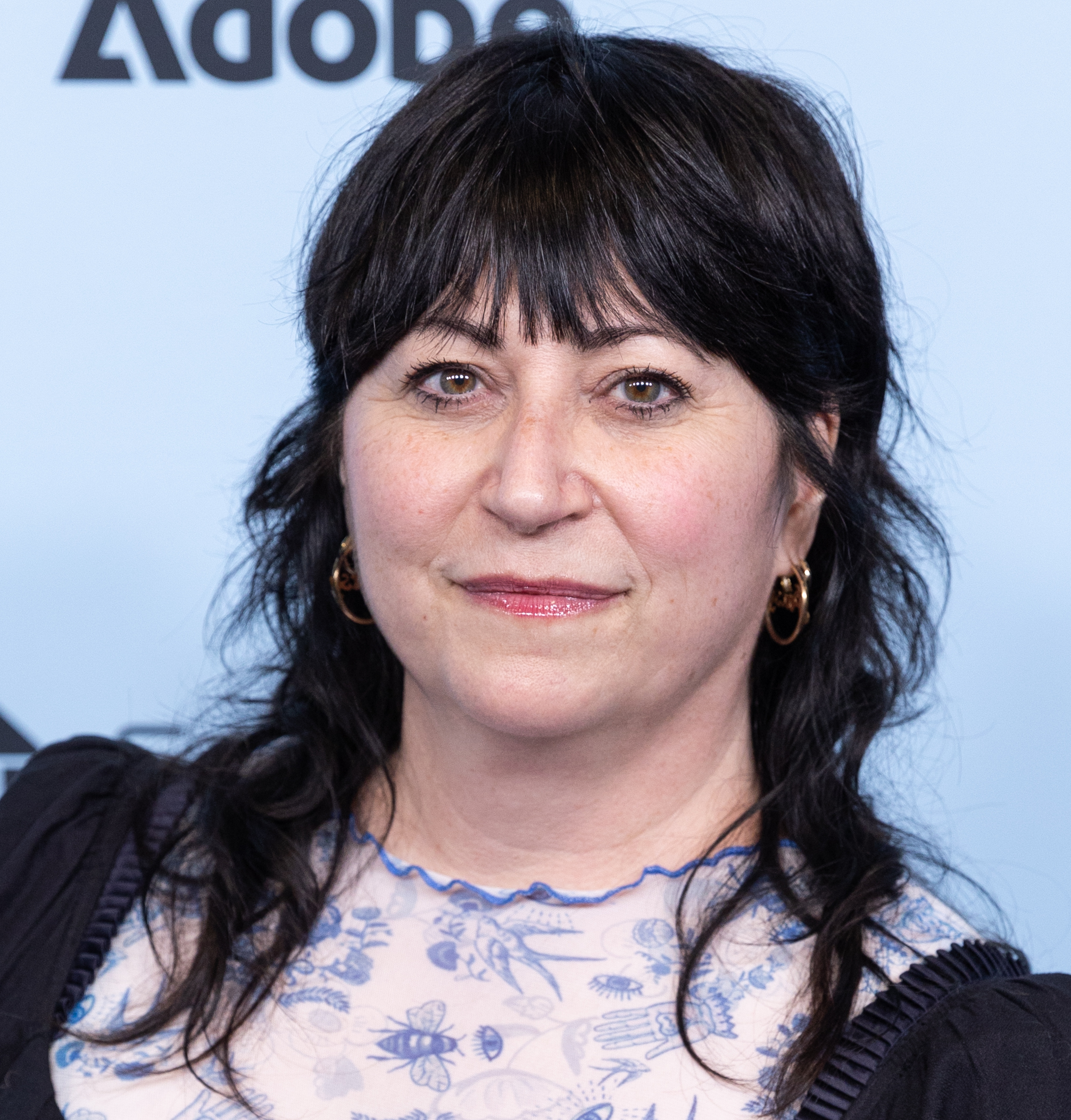
- McNeil in 2025
- Occupations: Costume designer Production designer
- Awards: Canadian Screen Award for Best Costume Design

Patricia McNeil is a Canadian costume designer and production designer. She is a three-time winner of the Canadian Screen Award for Best Costume Design, for the films Nelly, The Great Darkened Days (La grande noirceur) and The Twentieth Century, and a winner of the Canadian Screen Award for Best Art Direction/Production Design for The Great Darkened Days.

In 2011, she was nominated for the Genie Award for Costume Design for The Wild Hunt. McNeil designed the costumes for Anne Émond's 2015 film Our Loved Ones, with The Hollywood Reporter reviewing the costuming as "thankfully not too obsessed with aging and getting the period right". McNeil worked for Émond again on Nelly. She collaborated with Simon Bélanger and José Manuel St-Jacques of UNTTLD on the film, drawing inspiration from Marilyn Monroe.

In addition to designing the costumes, McNeil served as production designer for The Great Darkened Days.

== Awards and nominations ==
Film	Year	Award	Result	Ref(s)
The Wild Hunt	2011	Genie Award for Best Costume Design	Nominated	
Nelly	2017	Canadian Screen Award for Best Costume Design	Won	
The Great Darkened Days	2019	Canadian Screen Award for Best Costume Design	Won	
The Great Darkened Days	2019	Canadian Screen Award for Best Art Direction/Production Design	Won	
The Great Darkened Days	2019	Prix Iris for Best Art Direction	Nominated	
The Twentieth Century	2020	Canadian Screen Award for Best Costume Design	Won	
The Twentieth Century	2020	Prix Iris for Best Costume Design	Won	
A Brother's Love	2020	Prix Iris for Best Costume Design	Nominated	
A Brother's Love	2020	Canadian Screen Award for Best Costume Design	Nominated	
My Salinger Year	2021	Canadian Screen Award for Best Costume Design	Nominated	
My Salinger Year	2021	Prix Iris for Best Costume Design	Nominated	
