= Luc Picard =

Canadian actor and comedian (born 1961)

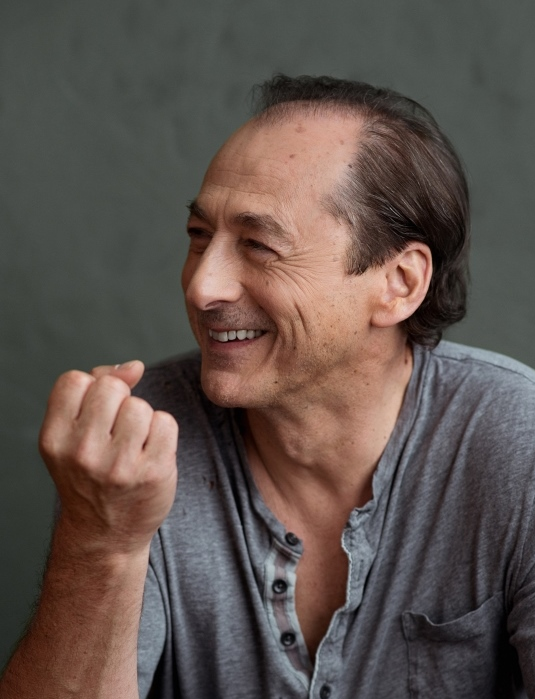
- Portrait
- Born: 24 September 1961 (age 64); Lachine, Quebec, Canada
- Occupations: Actor, director, screenwriter
- Years active: 1989–present

Luc Picard (born 24 September 1961) is a French Canadian actor, director and comedian.

== Early life and education ==
Picard was born on 24 September 1961, in Lachine, Quebec, Canada. He trained at the Conservatoire d'art dramatique de Montréal, and quickly became a favourite with Quebec audiences with his frequent appearances on television.

== Career ==
During the 1990s, following his debut performance in Letters of Transit (Les Sauf-conduits) he slowly developed as a film star with character roles in a variety of films, especially those by Pierre Falardeau. In 2002, Picard scored a double triumph with a Genie Award for his performance as the psychotic cult leader in Savage Messiah and a Prix Jutra for The Collector, directed by Jean Beaudin. In 2005, he directed his first feature, Audition, which was followed by Babine in 2008, Ésimésac in 2012, 9 in 2016, and Cross My Heart in 2017.

He is most commonly known for his portrayal of the infamous Michel Chartrand in the biographical TV series Simmone et Chartrand, where he was nominated for Gemini Awards. His acting film credits also include A Sunday in Kigali (Un dimanche a Kigali), Cap Tourmente, The Woman Who Drinks (La Femme qui boit), The Last Breath (Le Dernier souffle), Detour (Détour), Night Song, Isla Blanca and Bad Seeds (Les Mauvaises herbes).

In 2016, he directed a segment of the collective film 9.

He both directed and stars in the 2021 film Confessions of a Hitman about Canadian contract killer Gerald Gallant. He received a Prix Iris nomination for Best Actor at the 25th Quebec Cinema Awards in 2023.

== Personal life ==
He was formerly married to actress Isabel Richer, until they announced their split in 2013. Their son Henri Picard is an actor.

== Filmography ==
=== Film ===
Year	Title	Role	Notes
1989	How to Make Love to a Negro Without Getting Tired	Policier #2	
1990	Ding et Dong	Livreur Ding	
1991	Nelligan	Gonzalgue Deslauriers	
1991	Letters of Transit (Les sauf-conduits)	Marc	
1992	The Saracen Woman (La Sarrasine)	Adrien	
1992	La fenêtre	Raphaël	
1993	The Sex of the Stars (Le Sexe des étoiles)	J. Boulet	
1993	Cap Tourmente	Wilfrid Bourgault	
1994	Octobre	Felquiste	
1994	Si belles	Mario	
1996	Mistaken Identity	Richard	
1996	Remue-ménage	Maurice	
1998	Streetheart (Le Cœur au poing)	Lézard	
1999	The Last Breath (Le Dernier souffle)	Lauren Vaillancourt	
1999	Elvis Gratton II: Miracle à Memphis	Sikh Elvis	
2000	Holiday	Paul Delperée	
2001	February 15, 1839 (15 février 1839)	François-Marie-Thomas de Lorimier	
2001	The Woman Who Drinks (La Femme qui boit)	Frank	
2002	The Collector (Le Collectionneur)	Michel Rochon	
2002	Savage Messiah	Roch Thériault	
2003	8:17 p.m. Darling Street	Gérard	
2005	Audition	Louis Tremblay	
2006	A Sunday in Kigali	Bernard Valcourt	
2008	Babine	Toussaint Brodeur	
2009	Detour	Léo Huff	
2011	Wetlands (Marécages)	Jean	
2012	Ésimésac	Toussaint Brodeur	
2013	La maison du pêcheur	Duguay	
2016	Bad Seeds (Les Mauvaises herbes)	Patenaude	
2016	Night Song	Daniel Dussault	
2018	Isla Blanca	Pierre	
2018	The Fireflies Are Gone (La disparition des lucioles)	Sylvain, père de Léo	
2021	Confessions of a Hitman (Confessions)	Gerald Gallant	Also director
2022	Family Game (Arsenault et fils)	André Arsenault	
2026	Redemptions (Rédemptions)	Marcel	Also director

=== Television ===
Year	Title	Role	Notes
1992	Shehaweh	Elizabeth's Man	Episode #1.4
1993	Scoop II	Bertrand Gagnon	3 episodes
1993	Blanche	Émilien Pronovost	2 episodes
1993	Les grands procès	M. Castonguay	Episode: "Ginette Couture-Marchand"
1994	Scoop III	Bertrand Gagnon	Episode #3.5
1996	Omerta	François Pelletier	11 episodes
1996	La Petite Vie	Guy	Episode: "Rénald gai"
1997	Omertà II - La loi du silence	François Pelletier	14 episodes
1998	Traces d'étoiles	Henry	Television film
2000–2003	Chartrand et Simonne	Michel Chartrand	12 episodes
2006	Vice caché	Michel Champagne	18 episodes
2010	En audition avec Simon	Luc Picard	Episode: "Luc Picard"
2011	Malenfant	Raymond Malenfant	4 episodes
2012	Les Boys	Pidz	Episode: "Vedettes de la pub!"
2014–2015	Les Jeunes Loups	Marc Quenneville	20 episodes
2016	Blue Moon	Benoit Lebel	11 episodes
2017	Sur-Vie	Charles Grisé	6 episodes
2017–2018	District 31	Geoffroy Morin	130 episodes
2022	Aller simple	Denis Théberge	6 episodes
