= Bachir Bensaddek =

Canadian television director

- Born: Algeria
- Occupations: Film director, producer, screenwriter
- Years active: 2001–present

Bachir Bensaddek is a Canadian television director of Algerian Berber descent, best known for his co-direction of 2002 Emmy Award-winning TV series Cirque du Soleil: Fire Within.

Born in Algeria in the year 1972, Bensaddek came to Montreal, Quebec, Canada in 1992 as a student before immigrating to Canada. Bensaddek wrote a play in 2004 entitled Montréal la blanche about Algerian immigrants in Quebec.

In May 2011, he released his documentary film Rap arabe, an ORBI-XXI production, covering the rap scene in three countries (Morocco, Lebanon, Syria) with a number of rappers including Malikah, Ashekman, Lil Zac and Don Bigg. It had its premiere at the 27th Festival international de cinéma Vues d'Afrique, and was rebroadcast on RDI, TV5 and Al Jazeera's Documentary channel.

== Filmography ==
- 2001: L'eau à la bouche (TV)
- 2001: Cirque du Soleil: Fire Within (TV series)
- 2005: Le Dernier cycle (web, short film)
- 2005: The girl who sleeps (film)
- 2006: Enfants de la balle (TV)
- 2007: Portrait de dame par un groupe (Documentary)
- 2008: Seules (TV)
- 2009: Pachamama (TV series)
- 2011: Rap arabe
- 2016: Montreal, White City (Montréal la blanche) (film)
- 2024: La femme cachée
- 2026: You Will Be Free (Ma fille tu seras libre)

== Awards ==
- In 2003, the series he co-directed, Cirque du Soleil: Fire Within, won an Emmy Award.
- In 2007, his film Portrait de dame par un groupe won the "Prix AQCC" (Association québécoise des critiques de cinéma) for "2007 Best Documentary Short".
- In 2011, his film Rap arabe won the "Prix ACIC / ONF" (National Film Board of Canada) for "Best Independent Production" in the section Regards d'ici.
