= Montreal, White City =

- Film poster
- French: Montréal la blanche
- Directed by: Bachir Bensaddek
- Written by: Bachir Bensaddek; Louis-François Grenier
- Produced by: Cédric Bourdeau; Stéphane Tanguay
- Starring: Karina Aktouf; Rabah Aït Ouyahia
- Cinematography: Alex Margineanu
- Edited by: Patrick Demers
- Music by: Nedjim Bouizzoul
- Production company: Productions Kinésis
- Distributed by: K-Films Amérique
- Release date: January 2016 (Rotterdam)
- Running time: 87 minutes
- Country: Canada
- Languages: French; Arabic

Montreal, White City (French: Montréal la blanche) is a Canadian drama film, released in 2016. The narrative feature film debut of documentarian and television director Bachir Bensaddek, the film was based on his own earlier theatrical play.

The film centres on Kahina (Karina Aktouf), a former Algerian pop star who abandoned the country during the Algerian Civil War and emigrated to Canada to live in peace and privacy. One Christmas Eve, however, she gets into a taxi driven by Amokrane (Rabah Aït Ouyahia), a more recent Algerian immigrant who recognizes her, forcing each to confront questions of personal identity and cultural assimilation as their personal stories and dramas collide.

== Accolades ==
At the 5th Canadian Screen Awards in 2017, Bensaddek received a nomination for Best Adapted Screenplay.

Award	Date of ceremony	Category	Recipient(s)	Result	Ref(s)
Canadian Screen Awards	12 March 2017	Best Adapted Screenplay	Bachir Bensaddek	Nominated	
Prix Iris	4 June 2017	Best Director	Bachir Bensaddek	Nominated	
Prix Iris	4 June 2017	Best Actress	Karina Aktouf	Nominated	
Prix Iris	4 June 2017	Best Screenplay	Bachir Bensaddek	Nominated	
