= Living With Giants =

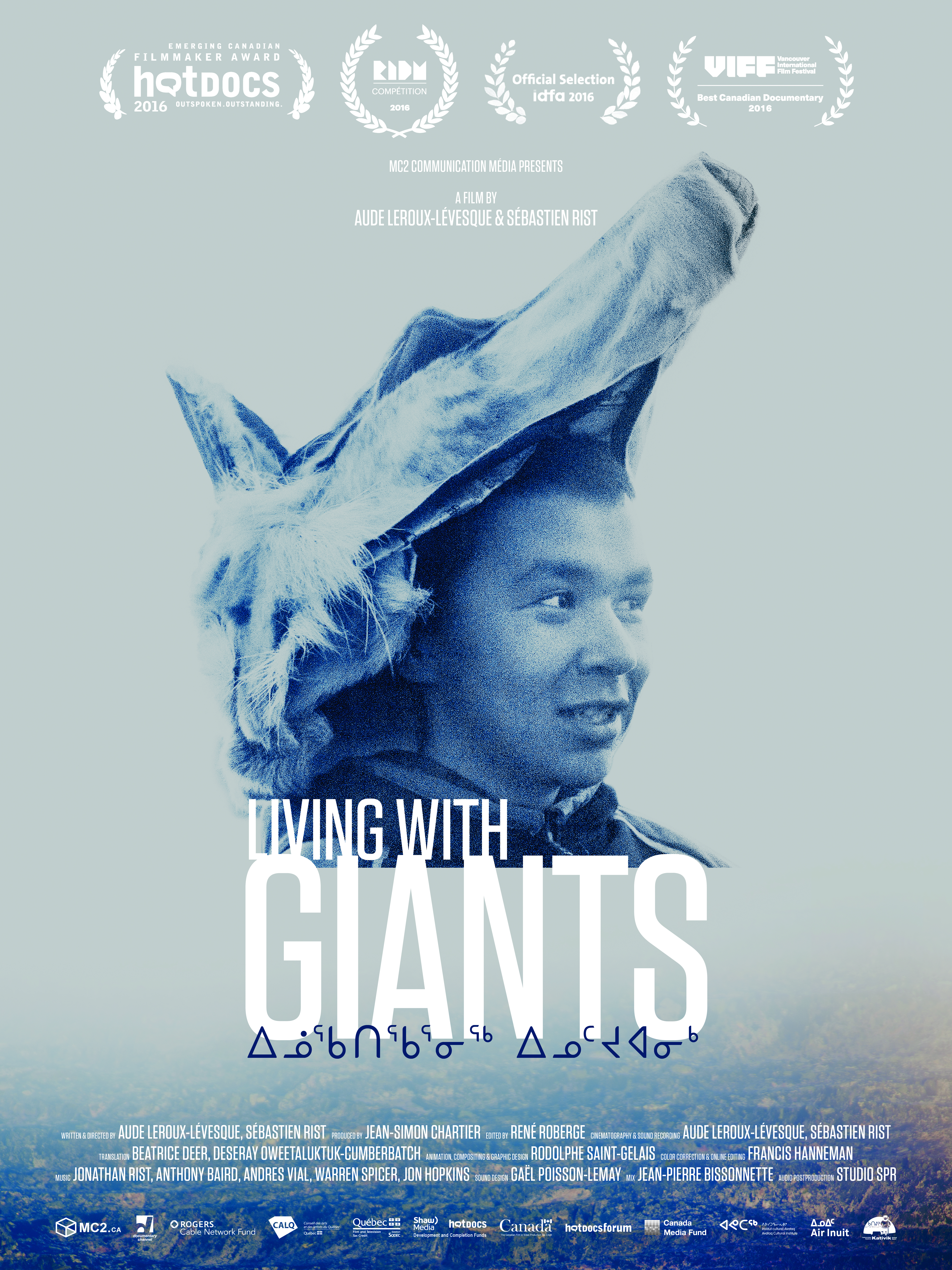
- Theatrical release poster
- French: Chez les géants
- Directed by: Aude Leroux-Lévesques; Sébastien Rist
- Produced by: MC2 Communication Média
- Cinematography: Sébastien Rist
- Edited by: René Roberge
- Release date: May 4, 2016 (Hot Docs)
- Running time: 78 minutes
- Country: Canada
- Languages: English; Inuktitut

Living With Giants (French: Chez les géants) is a feature-length documentary directed by Aude Leroux-Lévesque and Sébastien Rist and produced by MC2 Communication Média in 2016. The filmmakers capture the tragic reality of a young Inuit in the Arctic landscapes of Nunavik.

== Plot ==
Paulusie, is an innocent teenager, a caring son, and a romantic boyfriend. His only wish is to build a quiet family, and his only joys are hunting and taking care of his loved ones. But for this young inuk, facing the responsibilities that come with adulthood appears less easy as he would imagine. One day Paulusie makes a big mistake heavy of consequences. The young man struggles with guilt and ultimately takes the dramatic decision of taking his own life.

== Awards and nominations ==
Organisme	Année	Récompense	Gagnant
Hot Docs Canadian International Documentary Festival	2016	Emerging Canadian Filmmaker Award (won)	Aude Leroux-Lévesque; Sébastien Rist; MC2 Communication Média
Vancouver International Film Festival	2016	Best Canadian Documentary (won)	Aude Leroux-Lévesque Sébastien Rist MC2 Communication Média
Amsterdam International Documentary Film Festival	2016	Audience Award (nominated)	Aude Leroux-Lévesque; Sébastien Rist; MC2 Communication Média
Rencontres internationales du documentaire de Montréal	2016	Audience Award (nominated) Grand Prize (nominated) Quebec/Canada Best Hope Award (nominated)	Aude Leroux-Lévesque Sébastien Rist MC2 Communication Média
