= For Those Who Don't Read Me =

- Film poster
- French: À tous ceux qui ne me lisent pas
- Directed by: Yan Giroux
- Screenplay by: Guillaume Corbeil; Yan Giroux
- Story by: Yan Giroux
- Produced by: Luc Déry; Élaine Hébert; Kim McCraw
- Starring: Martin Dubreuil; Céline Bonnier; Henri Picard
- Cinematography: Ian Lagarde
- Edited by: Elric Robichon
- Music by: Jocelyn Tellier
- Release date: November 23, 2018
- Running time: 107 minutes
- Country: Canada
- Language: French

For Those Who Don't Read Me (French: À tous ceux qui ne me lisent pas) is a Canadian drama film, directed by Yan Giroux and released in 2018. Loosely inspired by the life of Québécois poet Yves Boisvert, the film stars Martin Dubreuil as Boisvert and depicts the effect that his life as a struggling writer has on his relationship with his girlfriend Dyane Gagnon (Céline Bonnier) and her son Marc (Henri Picard).

The film received three Canadian Screen Award nominations at the 7th Canadian Screen Awards, and 12 Prix Iris nominations at the 21st Quebec Cinema Awards.

== Accolades ==
Award	Date of ceremony	Category	Recipient(s)	Result	Ref(s)
Canadian Screen Awards	March 31, 2019	Best Art Direction/Production Design	Marie-Claude Gosselin	Nominated	
Canadian Screen Awards	March 31, 2019	Best Cinematography	Ian Lagarde	Nominated	
Canadian Screen Awards	March 31, 2019	Best Editing	Elric Robichon	Nominated	
Prix Iris	June 2, 2019	Best Film	Luc Déry, Élaine Hébert, Kim McCraw	Nominated	
Prix Iris	June 2, 2019	Best Director	Yan Giroux	Nominated	
Prix Iris	June 2, 2019	Best Actor	Martin Dubreuil	Won	
Prix Iris	June 2, 2019	Best Supporting Actor	Henri Picard	Nominated	
Prix Iris	June 2, 2019	Best Supporting Actress	Céline Bonnier	Nominated	
Prix Iris	June 2, 2019	Best Screenplay	Guillaume Corbeil, Yan Giroux	Won	
Prix Iris	June 2, 2019	Best Cinematography	Ian Lagarde	Nominated	
Prix Iris	June 2, 2019	Best Art Direction	Marie-Claude Gosselin	Nominated	
Prix Iris	June 2, 2019	Best Editing	Elric Robichon	Nominated	
Prix Iris	June 2, 2019	Best Costume Design	Mélanie Garcia	Nominated	
Prix Iris	June 2, 2019	Best Make-Up	Audrey Bitton	Nominated	
Prix Iris	June 2, 2019	Best Hairstyling	Nathalie Dion	Nominated	
