= Francesca Chamberland =

Canadian costume designer

- Occupation: Costume designer
- Awards: Genie Award for Best Costume Design

Francesca Chamberland is a Canadian costume designer. She began her career working in the wardrobe department on films including Some Girls (1988) and In Love and War (1996), eventually becoming wardrobe master for the 1997 film In the Presence of Mine Enemies.

She won the 2007 Genie Award for Best Costume Design for her work in the film The Rocket: The Maurice Richard Story. She had been nominated four times in the same category (including twice at the Genie Awards of 2006). She has also earned two Jutra Award nominations, winning the Prix Iris for Costume Design for the 2016 film Wild Run: The Legend (Chasse-Galerie: La Légende).
