= Green Party of Quebec candidates in the 1989 Quebec provincial election =

The Green Party of Quebec fielded forty-six candidates in the 1989 Quebec provincial election, none of whom were elected. Information about these candidates may be found on this page.

== List of candidates (incomplete) ==
Riding	Candidate's Name	Notes	Gender	Residence	Occupation	Votes	%	Rank
Dorion	Agnès Grimaud		F			878	3.85	3rd
Nicolet-Yamaska	Jean-Léon Deschênes		M			1,111	4.11	3rd
Richmond	Jack Kugelmass	Kugelmass later ran for Montreal city council in the 2013 municipal election as a Projet Montréal candidate in Verdun.	M			555	2.30	3rd
