= Mario Davignon =

Canadian costume designer

Mario Davignon is a Canadian costume designer, who won the Genie Award for Best Costume Design at the 25th Genie Awards in 2005 for the film Head in the Clouds. He was a nominee for the award on five other occasions, at the 23rd Genie Awards in 2003 for Savage Messiah, at the 27th Genie Awards in 2007 for Tideland, at the 31st Genie Awards in 2011 for The Trotsky, at the 5th Canadian Screen Awards in 2017 for Race, and at the 6th Canadian Screen Awards in 2018 for Hochelaga, Land of Souls (Hochelaga, terre des âmes).

He won a Costume Designers Guild Award at the 10th Costume Designers Guild Awards, and was a finalist for the Primetime Emmy Award for Outstanding Costumes for a Miniseries, Movie, or Special, for his work on Bury My Heart at Wounded Knee.

In 2015, Davignon collaborated with clothing retailer Le Château to produce and sell a line of clothing based on his designs for the film After the Ball.
