= Toronto Raptors =

National Basketball Association team in Toronto, Ontario

- 2026–27 Toronto Raptors season
- Conference: Eastern
- Division: Atlantic
- Founded: 1995
- History: Toronto Raptors; 1995–present
- Arena: Scotiabank Arena
- Location: Toronto, Ontario
- Team colours: Red, black, purple, gold, white
- Main sponsor: Sun Life Financial
- President: Vacant
- General manager: Bobby Webster
- Head coach: Darko Rajaković
- Ownership: Maple Leaf Sports & Entertainment
- Affiliation: Raptors 905
- Championships: 1 (2019)
- Conference titles: 1 (2019)
- Division titles: 7 (2007, 2014, 2015, 2016, 2018, 2019, 2020)
- Retired numbers: 1 (15)
- Website: nba.com/raptors
Association	Icon	Statement

The Toronto Raptors are a Canadian professional basketball team based in Toronto. The Raptors compete in the National Basketball Association (NBA) as a member of the Atlantic Division of the Eastern Conference. The team plays its home games at Scotiabank Arena, which it shares with the Toronto Maple Leafs of the National Hockey League (NHL). The team was founded in 1995 as part of the NBA's expansion into Canada, along with the Vancouver Grizzlies. The Raptors have been the only Canadian team in the league since the 2001–02 season, when the Grizzlies moved from Vancouver to Memphis, Tennessee.

As with most expansion teams, the Raptors struggled in their early years, but after the acquisition of Vince Carter through a draft-day trade in 1998, the franchise set league-attendance records and made the NBA playoffs in 2000, 2001, and 2002. Carter was instrumental in leading the team to their first playoff series win in 2001, where they advanced to the Eastern Conference semifinals. During the 2002–03 and 2003–04 seasons, they failed to make progress, and Carter was traded in 2004 to the New Jersey Nets.

After Carter left, Chris Bosh emerged as the team leader. For the 2006–07 season, Bryan Colangelo was appointed as general manager, and through a combination of Bosh, 2006 first overall draft pick Andrea Bargnani, and a revamp of the roster, the Raptors qualified for their first playoff berth in five years, capturing the Atlantic Division title. In the 2007–08 season, they also advanced to the playoffs but failed to reach the postseason in each of the next five seasons. Colangelo overhauled the team's roster for the 2009–10 season in a bid to persuade pending free agent Bosh to stay, but Bosh departed to sign with the Miami Heat in July 2010, ushering in yet another era of rebuilding for the Raptors.

Masai Ujiri replaced Colangelo in 2013 and helped herald a new era of success, led by a backcourt duo of DeMar DeRozan and Kyle Lowry. The Raptors returned to the playoffs the following year and became a consistent playoff team in every year of Ujiri's tenure. Under Ujiri, the team also won five Division titles and registered their most successful regular season in 2018. However, the team's failure to reach the NBA Finals prompted Ujiri to fire head coach Dwane Casey after the 2018 playoffs concluded and to trade DeRozan for Kawhi Leonard and Danny Green later that summer, as well as to acquire Marc Gasol before the trade deadline. Toronto also saw the break-out of Pascal Siakam, the 27th overall pick in the 2016 NBA draft, who won the NBA Most Improved Player that year. In the 2019 playoffs, the Raptors won their first Eastern Conference title and advanced to their first NBA Finals, where they won their first NBA championship.

After the Raptors won their first championship, Leonard left in free agency. After Lowry's departure via trade in 2021, Siakam became the face of the franchise until 2024 when Siakam was traded to the Indiana Pacers, leaving Scottie Barnes as the new face of the franchise.

== History ==
=== Background ===
On November 1, 1946, the Toronto Huskies hosted the New York Knickerbockers at Maple Leaf Gardens in Toronto, in what was the first game played in NBA history (as the Basketball Association of America). However, the Huskies folded after the initial 1946–47 season. Toronto did not host another NBA game until the 1970s, when the Buffalo Braves (predecessor to the Los Angeles Clippers) played a total of 16 regular season games at Maple Leaf Gardens from 1971 to 1975.

Interest to move or expand an NBA franchise to Toronto grew during the late-1980s; with former NBA commissioner David Stern later describing the expansion to Toronto as a "safe step", given the market size and the likelihood of success in the city. The NBA organized two exhibition games in 1989 and 1992 with an attendance of over 25,000 people each, both in the newly built SkyDome.

The NBA began to seriously consider expansion into Toronto after they received an unsolicited application fee from the Palestra Group, headed by Larry Tanenbaum. The Palestra Group was one of several seeking an NBA franchise, with Professional Basketball Franchise (Canada) Inc. (PBF) formally submitting an application for a Toronto-based team on April 23, 1993. Later that year, in July, the NBA Expansion Committee visited various existing and proposed stadium sites along with the bid contenders. On September 30, 1993, the committee recommended conditionally awarding PBF the franchise.

=== Creation ===
The team was formalized on November 4, 1993, when the NBA Board of Governors endorsed the decision of Expansion Committee and awarded its 28th franchise to a group headed by Toronto businessman John Bitove for a then-record expansion fee of US$125 million. Bitove and Allan Slaight of Slaight Communications each owned 44 per cent, with the Bank of Nova Scotia (10 per cent), David Peterson (1 per cent), and Phil Granovsky (1 per cent) being minority partners. Wagering on NBA games in Ontario nearly cost Toronto the expansion franchise, due to strict league rules at the time that prohibited gambling. However, an agreement was reached whereby the Ontario Lottery and Gaming Corporation (OLG), which is the provincial lottery corporation that regulates gambling in Ontario, agreed to stop offering wagering on all NBA games in exchange for a donation by the Raptors of $5 million in its first three years and $1 million annually afterwards to its charitable foundation to compensate OLG for its loss of revenue. The Raptors, along with the Vancouver Grizzlies, played their first game on November 3, 1995.

==== Naming the team ====
Initial sentiment was in favour of reviving the Huskies nickname, but team management realized it would be nearly impossible to design a logo that did not substantially resemble that of the Minnesota Timberwolves to avoid confusion with that team. As a result, a nationwide contest was held to help name the team and develop their colours and logo. Over 2,000 entries were narrowed down to ten prospects: Beavers, Bobcats, Dragons, Grizzlies, Hogs, Raptors, Scorpions, T-Rex, Tarantulas, and Terriers. The final selection—Toronto Raptors—was unveiled on Canadian national television on May 15, 1994: the choice was influenced by the popularity of the 1993 film adaption of the 1990 science fiction novel Jurassic Park by Michael Crichton; The name "Raptor" is a common informal name for the Velociraptor, a species of dinosaur featured in the film. On May 24, 1994, the team's logo and first general manager, Isiah Thomas, were revealed at a press conference. As part of the deal, Thomas received an option to purchase part of the team, reportedly for under market value. He would purchase 4.5 per cent in May 1995 and a further 4.5 per cent in December 1995, half each from Bitove and Slaight, decreasing their share to 39.5 per cent. The team's colours of bright red, purple, black, and silver were also revealed; "Naismith" silver was chosen to honour Canadian James Naismith, the inventor of basketball. The team originally competed in the Central Division, and before the inaugural season began, sales of Raptors merchandise ranked seventh in the league, marking a successful return of professional basketball to Canada.

=== 1995–1999: Struggles of a new franchise ===
As general manager, Isiah Thomas quickly staffed the management positions with his own personnel, naming long-time Detroit Pistons assistant Brendan Malone as the Raptors' head coach. The team's roster was then filled as a result of an expansion draft in 1995. Following a coin flip, Toronto was given first choice and selected Chicago Bulls point guard and three-point specialist B. J. Armstrong. Armstrong refused to report to the club, and Thomas promptly traded him to the Golden State Warriors for power forwards Carlos Rogers and Victor Alexander. Thomas then selected a wide range of players in the expansion draft, including veterans Jerome Kersey, Willie Anderson and his former Pistons teammate John Salley.

Subsequent to the expansion draft, the Raptors landed the seventh pick in the NBA draft lottery, behind their fellow 1995 expansion club, the Vancouver Grizzlies. Thomas selected Damon Stoudamire, a point guard out of Arizona, around whom the franchise would seek to construct its near future. However, the selection of Stoudamire was met with boos from fans at the 1995 NBA draft at the SkyDome in Toronto, many of whom wanted Ed O'Bannon of UCLA, an NCAA Final Four Most Valuable Player.

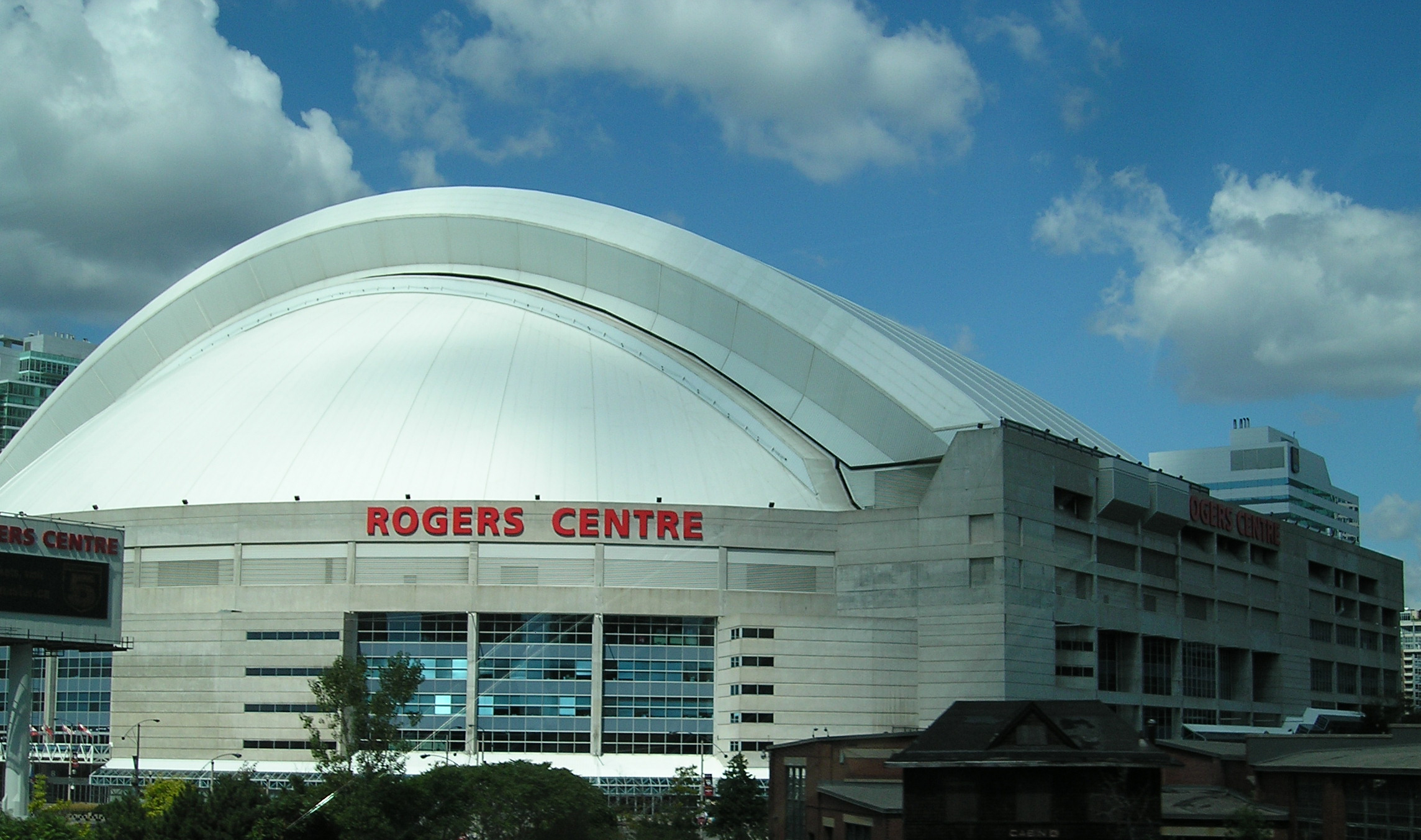
SkyDome, known as Rogers Centre since 2005, was the original venue for Raptors home games from 1995 to 1999

In the team's first official NBA game, Alvin Robertson scored the first NBA points in Raptors history, while Stoudamire recorded 10 points and 10 assists in a 94–79 victory over the New Jersey Nets. The Raptors concluded their inaugural season with a 21–61 win–loss record, although they were one of the few teams to defeat the Chicago Bulls, who set a then all-time NBA best 72–10 win–loss regular season record. With averages of 19.0 points and 9.3 assists per game, Stoudamire also won the 1995–96 Rookie of the Year Award.

In November of the 1996–97 season, Bitove sold his ownership interest in the team to Slaight for $65 million after Slaight had activated a shotgun clause in their partnership agreement, giving Slaight 79 per cent control of the team, and remaining minority partner of the Bank of Nova Scotia (10 per cent), Thomas (9 per cent) Peterson (1 per cent) and Granovsky (1 per cent). Slaight subsequently acquired the 1 per cent, which had been owned by both Peterson and Granovsky, who had died a year earlier. In their second season the team put up a 30–52 record and selected centre Marcus Camby with the second overall pick in the 1996 NBA draft. By the end of the season, Camby earned a berth on the NBA's All-Rookie Team, while Stoudamire continued to play well, averaging 20.2 points and 8.8 assists per game. As in the previous season, the Raptors were one of only 11 teams to topple the eventual 1997 champions, the Chicago Bulls. The Raptors also defeated the Houston Rockets, Utah Jazz and Miami Heat, all of which were eventual Conference finalists. However, the Raptors struggled against teams who were not of championship calibre, including three losses to the 15–67 Boston Celtics.

In the 1997–98 season, the team suffered numerous injuries and slid into a 17-game losing streak. After Thomas' attempts to execute a letter of intent with Slaight to purchase the team failed, he resigned his position with the team in November and sold his 9 per cent stake in the team to Slaight. This left Slaight with 90 per cent and the Bank of Nova Scotia with 10 per cent. Thomas was replaced by Glen Grunwald as general manager. With Thomas gone, Stoudamire immediately sought a trade. On February 13, 1998, he was shipped to the Portland Trail Blazers along with Walt Williams and Carlos Rogers for Kenny Anderson, Alvin Williams, Gary Trent, two first-round draft choices, a second-round draft choice and cash. Anderson refused to report to Toronto and was traded to the Celtics with Žan Tabak and Popeye Jones for Chauncey Billups, Dee Brown, Roy Rogers and John Thomas. When the trading deadline was over, the Raptors became the youngest team in the league with an average age of 24.6 years. They had five rookies on their roster, including the 18-year-old Tracy McGrady, who at the time was the youngest player in the NBA. The inexperienced Raptors struggled throughout the season and their regular season record regressed to 16–66.

On February 12, 1998, Maple Leaf Gardens Ltd., the owners of the Toronto Maple Leafs, purchased 100 per cent of the Raptors and the arena the team was building, Air Canada Centre, from Slaight and the Bank of Nova Scotia; Maple Leaf Gardens Ltd. later renamed itself Maple Leaf Sports & Entertainment (MLSE). MLSE paid a reported $467 million, made up of $179 million for the team and $288 million for the arena. During the 1998 NBA draft, in what became a defining move for the franchise, Grunwald traded the team's fourth overall pick Antawn Jamison to the Golden State Warriors for Vince Carter, who was selected fifth overall, and cash. To bring further credibility to the Raptors, Grunwald traded Marcus Camby to the New York Knicks for Charles Oakley, a veteran with playoff experience. Kevin Willis, another veteran acquired from the trade, solidified the centre position, while the coaching staff temporarily rotated Brown, Williams and Doug Christie to play point guard. Both Christie and Williams became talented players in their own right; Christie developed into one of the elite defenders in the NBA, while Williams improved his play on the offensive end. New coach Butch Carter was also credited with much of the team's turnaround during the lockout-shortened 1998–99 season. Although the team did not make the playoffs, many were optimistic with the impressive performances of Rookie of the Year Carter and a much improved McGrady.

=== 1999–2002: Success during the Vince Carter era ===
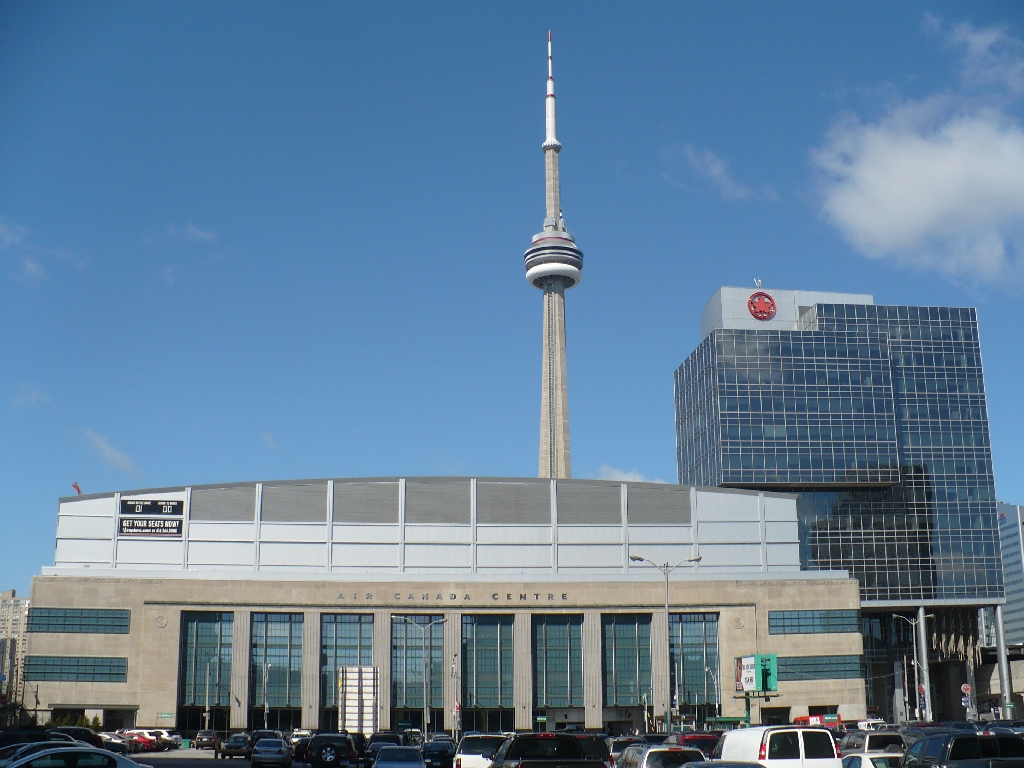
The Raptors moved to Scotiabank Arena (then known as Air Canada Centre) in 1999

During the 1999 NBA draft, believing that the Raptors still lacked a strong frontcourt presence, Grunwald traded first-round draft pick Jonathan Bender for a power forward, Antonio Davis of the Indiana Pacers. Davis quickly entered the Raptors starting line-up and he would develop into an All-Star in the coming years. Conversely, Bender would only play nine seasons and would be out of the league by age 29. In the backcourt, Carter, Christie, and Dell Curry played at the shooting guard position and Alvin Williams and Muggsy Bogues at point guard. The rotation of Davis, Oakley, and Willis in the frontcourt and Carter's and McGrady's improvement helped the team make its first-ever playoff appearance, fulfilling a promise Carter had made to fans in the previous season. Lacking significant postseason experience, Toronto was defeated 3–0 by the New York Knicks in the first round. Nonetheless, team improvements and the rise of Carter—who emphatically won the 2000 NBA Slam Dunk Contest—attracted many fans around Toronto, many of whom were previously not basketball fans. The season was also the first full year played at the Air Canada Centre, after having played four years at the cavernous SkyDome, which was better suited to baseball and Canadian football. Overall, the Raptors concluded the season with a 45–37 record.

Still, playoff failures and Butch Carter's media altercations surrounding Camby led Grunwald to replace Carter before the 2000–01 season with Lenny Wilkens, a Hall of Fame coach and player with more than 30 years of coaching experience. The team roster was also largely revamped, including the signing of veteran playmaker Mark Jackson on a four-year contract. When Alvin Williams later emerged as a clutch performer, Jackson was traded to allow Williams more playing time. In the 2000 off-season, free-agent McGrady opted to leave the Raptors in a sign-and-trade deal worth $67.5 million over six years, while giving a conditional draft pick as part of the agreement to the Orlando Magic for a first-round draft pick.

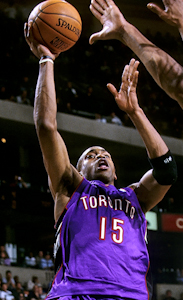
Vince Carter, drafted fifth in the 1998 NBA draft, played his first six seasons in the NBA with the Raptors

As predicted by analysts, the team easily secured a berth in the 2001 NBA playoffs with a franchise-high 47 wins. The Raptors won their first-ever playoff series as they defeated New York 3–2, advancing to the Eastern Conference semifinals for the first time in franchise history. Wilkens was praised for having Williams defend shooting guard Allan Houston and Carter defend small forward Latrell Sprewell, the two major Knicks offensive threats. The series with Philadelphia 76ers was a landmark for the Raptors in terms of performance and entertainment value. The Sixers relied on Allen Iverson and Dikembe Mutombo for their respective offensive and defensive abilities, along with steady help from Aaron McKie. Toronto was the more balanced team with Carter, Alvin Williams and Davis providing much of the offensive game and Chris Childs and Jerome Williams on defence. The series came down to the last few seconds of Game 7, when Carter's potential series-winning shot rolled off the rim. Carter was later widely criticized for attending his graduation ceremony at the University of North Carolina on the morning of Game 7, as he scored only 20 points on 6-for-18 shooting after a 39-point performance in Game 6. Despite the loss, the season is generally considered a watermark for the franchise, given the Raptors' franchise high of 47 wins and advancing beyond the first round of the playoffs.

The Vancouver Grizzlies' move to Memphis, Tennessee in 2001 left Toronto as the NBA's only Canadian team. In the summer of 2001, long-term contracts were given to Alvin Williams, Jerome Williams and Davis, while former NBA MVP centre Hakeem Olajuwon was signed to provide Carter with good support. The Raptors appeared to be on their way to another competitive season with a 29–21 record going into the All-Star break and with Carter the top vote-getter for the All-Star game for the third consecutive year. Carter then suffered a bout of patellar tendinitis (also known as "jumper's knee"), forcing him to miss the All-Star game and the rest of the season, and without their franchise player, Toronto lost 13 consecutive games. However, they were able to win 12 of their last 14 games, clinching a playoff spot on the last day of the regular season. The comeback featured some of the Raptors' best defence of the season, along with inspired performances by Davis and Keon Clark.

Despite Toronto's improved defensive performances, Carter's offence was sorely missed in the first-round series against the second-seeded Detroit Pistons. In the first game, Detroit overwhelmed Toronto 83–65, largely due to Ben Wallace's strong performance of 19 points, 20 rebounds, 3 blocks and 3 steals. Detroit also won Game 2, but Toronto won the next two games at home to force a deciding and tightly contested Game 5 in Detroit. With 10.7 seconds left in the game, and the Raptors down 85–82 with possession of the ball, Childs raced down the court and shot a three-pointer that missed badly, apparently trying to draw a foul on the play, instead of passing to a wide-open Curry. In a post-game locker room interview, Childs repeatedly insisted that the Raptors had been down four points, not three. The Raptors' late-season surge was thus marred by a disappointing playoff exit; the Olajuwon experiment was also a bust, with the 39-year-old averaging career lows in minutes, points and rebounds. Furthermore, Childs, Clark and Curry left the team, ensuring a new-look team for the next season.

=== 2002–2006: Another period of struggle ===
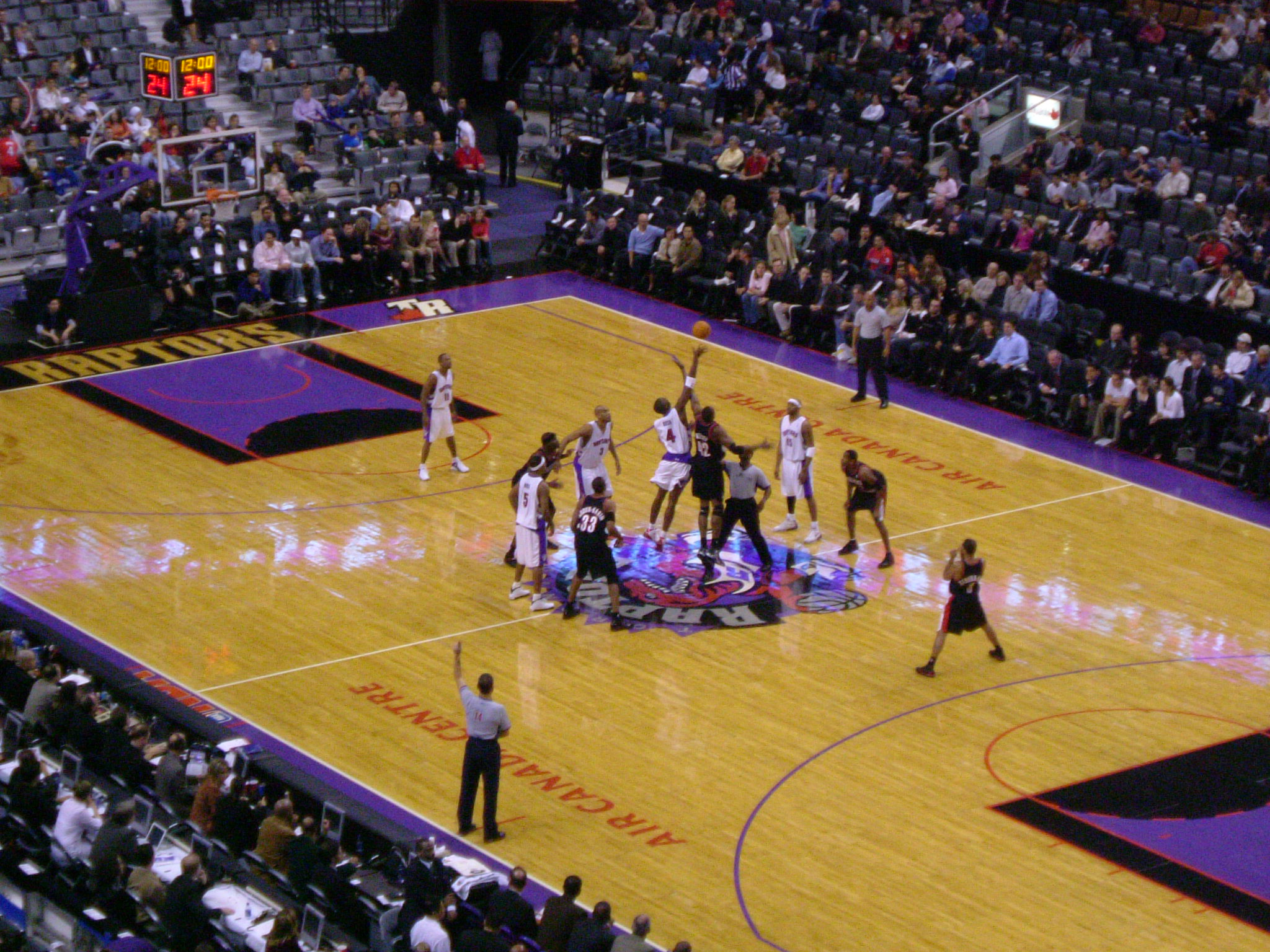
A game between the Raptors and the Portland Trail Blazers during the 2004–05 season, the first for the Raptors in the NBA's Atlantic Division

The 2002–03 season began with the same optimism that the Raptors exhibited in three consecutive playoff seasons, although it faded early. Carter, while voted as a starter in the 2003 All-Star Game, suffered a knee injury, while Davis expressed disinterest in Toronto and Wilkens' laissez-faire attitude created a team that lacked the motivation and spirit of the previous years' teams. The team was ravaged with injuries, losing an NBA record number of player games due to injury. Furthermore, the Raptors recorded the dubious honour of being the only team in NBA history not to dress 12 players for a single game in a season. Wilkens was criticized heavily by the Toronto media for his inability to clamp down on his players when necessary, especially given this was the year that Wilkens overtook Bill Fitch for the most losses by an NBA coach, with his loss total getting dangerously close to his win total. The Raptors ended the season with a 24–58 record and Wilkens was fired. This turned out to be a blessing in disguise, when the Raptors were given the fourth overall pick in the 2003 NBA draft and brought another star to Toronto in Chris Bosh.

Canadian country singer Shania Twain helped launch the new red Raptors alternate road uniform at the start of the 2003–04 season, and the jerseys made their debut in a 90–87 season-opening victory on October 29, 2003, against the defending Eastern Conference champions, the New Jersey Nets. Davis and Jerome Williams were traded early in the season for Jalen Rose and Donyell Marshall. After 50 games, Toronto was 25–25 and in a position to make the playoffs, but injuries to key players sent the Raptors plummeting down the standings. Rose, Carter and Alvin Williams all suffered injuries as the Raptors struggled to a record of 8–24 in their remaining games. The notable individual season performances were Carter's 22.5 ppg, Marshall's 10.7 rpg, and rookie Bosh, a 6 ft 10 in (2.08 m) forward-centre, averaging 11.5 ppg and 7.4 rpg and being named to the NBA All-Rookie Team. Williams' knee injury turned out to be career-ending.

For the 2004–05 season, the team moved into the Atlantic Division and the Raptors decided to revamp the team. Raptors' President and CEO of Maple Leaf Sports & Entertainment Richard Peddie fired Grunwald on April 1, 2004, after the team ended the season three games short of the eighth and final playoff spot in the previous season. Head coach Kevin O'Neill and his four assistant coaches were also dismissed immediately after Grunwald's termination. Toronto interim manager Jack McCloskey said: "While the blame for that certainly does not rest on O'Neill and his staff alone, we need a change." Rob Babcock was named general manager on June 7, 2004, alongside the appointments of Wayne Embry as senior advisor and Alex English as director of player development. Sam Mitchell, a former NBA forward and assistant coach of the Milwaukee Bucks, was hired as new head coach of the Raptors.

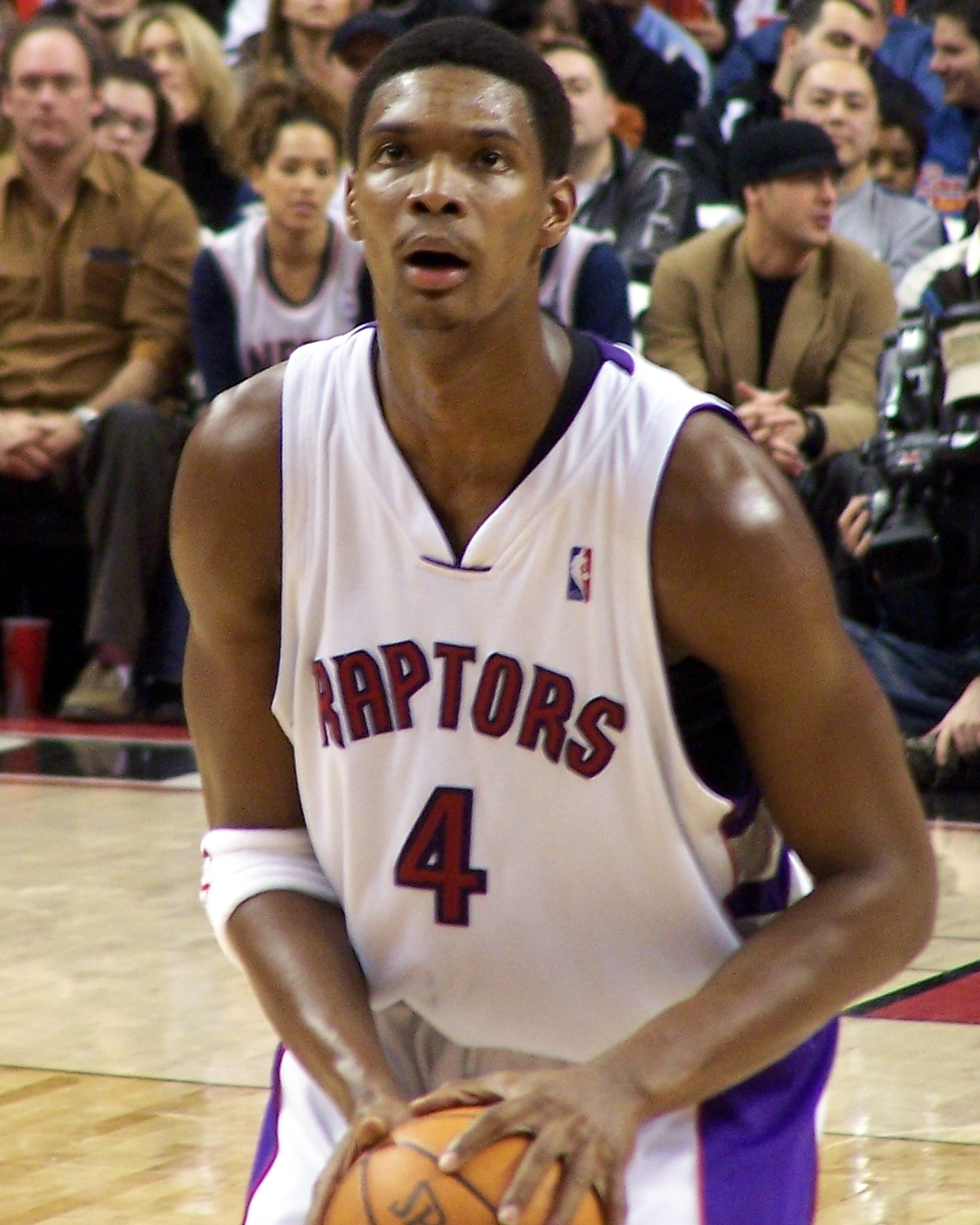
After the trade of Vince Carter in 2004, Chris Bosh became the face of the Raptors franchise until 2010

Babcock's first move as general manager was drafting centre Rafael Araújo—selected eighth overall—in the 2004 NBA draft, in a move that was criticized by fans and analysts, considering highly touted swingman Andre Iguodala was drafted with the next pick. Babcock signed point guard Rafer Alston to a five-year deal. After Vince Carter's annual charity game, Babcock implicitly revealed to the media that Carter's agent had asked for a trade, confirming Carter's discontent. The Toronto Sun reported that Carter felt he was being misled by the Raptors' hierarchy during the general manager search and had concluded that as long as the managerial structure at Maple Leaf Sports and Entertainment Ltd. remained intact, the Raptors would never be an elite team. Carter was finally traded mid-season, ending his six-year tenure. Toronto received Alonzo Mourning, forwards Eric Williams and Aaron Williams and two mid-to-late future first-round picks from the New Jersey Nets. Mourning chose not to report to Toronto, forcing Babcock to buy out the remainder of his contract at a reported $10 million, leaving him free to sign with the Miami Heat. Eric and Aaron Williams were supposed to add defensive toughness and rebounding, but were generally under-utilized for the entire season. Analysts had predicted Babcock got the bad end of the deal, and the trade eventually cost him his job.

Carter's departure heralded a new era for Toronto. Bosh stepped up to the role of franchise player and performed well in his sophomore campaign, ranking tenth in the league in defensive rebounds. In contrast to Bosh's emergence, Araújo struggled to keep a spot in the line-up, and became unpopular with fans and local media. Although the ACC was often well-attended due to the Raptors' 22–19 home record, their inability to win on the road (11–30) and a poor defensive record made Mitchell's first year as head coach unimpressive. Additionally, Mitchell had problems dealing with Alston, who openly expressed his unhappiness with Mitchell in a post-game interview. Later in the season, Alston was suspended two games for "conduct detrimental to the team" for reportedly walking out of a scrimmage during practice. Notwithstanding the unrest, in their first season competing in the Atlantic Division, Toronto maintained the same regular season record of 33–49 as the previous season.

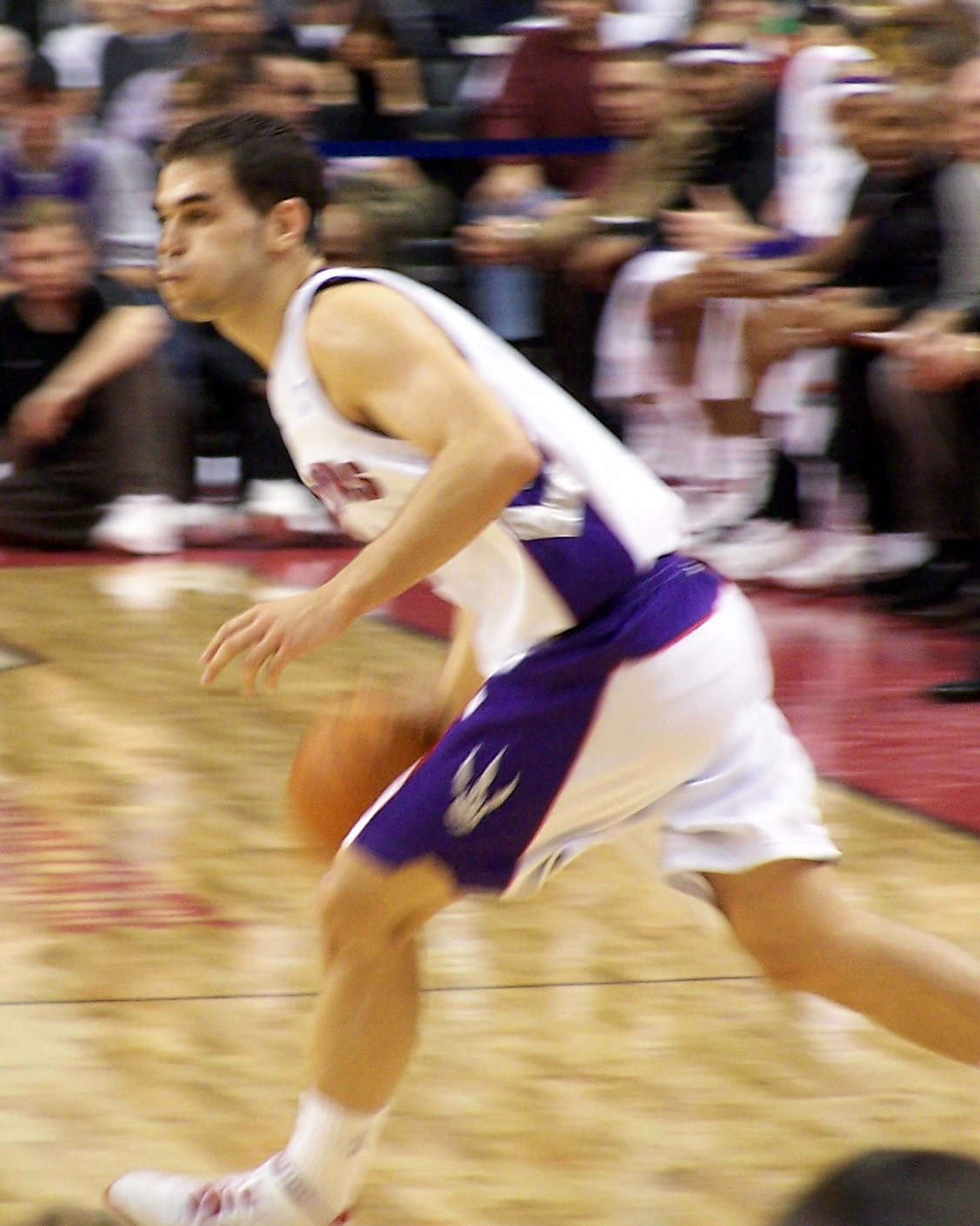
Jose Calderon with the Raptors during the 2005–06 season. The Raptors signed Calderon as a free agent in the 2005 off-season as a backup for Mike James.

The Raptors continued to rebuild during the 2005 NBA draft, selecting Charlie Villanueva, Joey Graham, Roko Ukić and Uroš Slokar, with Villanueva's selection being very controversial amongst basketball pundits and Raptors fans alike. The Raptors started their training camp by trading Alston to the Houston Rockets for Mike James and signing free agent José Calderón as a backup for James. Despite the infusion of new players, Toronto's overall 2005–06 season was a disappointment; they set a franchise record by losing their first nine games and 15 out of their first 16 games. With losses mounting and media scrutiny intensifying, the Raptors hired ex-Purdue coach Gene Keady as an assistant off the bench to help develop the young Raptors team and establish a defensive persona for the team. On January 15, 2006, the Raptors set a franchise points record in a 129–103 win over the Knicks when Villanueva hit a three-pointer late in the game. But less than a week later, the Raptors gave up an 18-point lead against the Los Angeles Lakers and allowed Lakers star Kobe Bryant to score 81 points, the second-highest single-game total in NBA history. With media scrutiny intensifying once more and the Raptors entrenched at the bottom of the league in defensive field goal percentage, CEO Richard Peddie fired Babcock.

The 2005–06 season was not a total disaster. Villanueva's play impressed both fans and former critics as he came in second in NBA Rookie of the Year and recorded 48 points in an overtime loss to Milwaukee Bucks, the most points scored by any rookie in franchise history and the most by a rookie in the NBA since 1997. Bosh was also named a reserve forward for the Eastern All-Star Team in the 2006 game, becoming the third Raptor after Vince Carter and Antonio Davis to appear in an All-Star Game. On February 27, 2006, the team named Bryan Colangelo, the 2004–05 NBA Executive of the Year, the president and general manager of the Raptors. Known for his success in transforming a lottery Phoenix team into a 62-win offensive juggernaut, his hiring gave hope to many fans. Still, Toronto ended the season weakly when Bosh suffered a season-ending thumb injury. The Raptors lost ten consecutive games after Bosh's injury and finished the season with the fifth worst record (27–55) in the NBA.

=== 2006–2010: Chris Bosh era ===
The 2006–07 season represented a watershed year for the Raptors franchise. The roster was overhauled, including the selection of 2006 NBA draft number one pick Andrea Bargnani, the acquisition of point guard T. J. Ford in exchange for Villanueva, and the signing of shooting guard Anthony Parker and small forward Jorge Garbajosa. Bosh was given a three-year contract extension, while Maurizio Gherardini of Benetton Treviso was hired as the club's vice-president and assistant general manager.

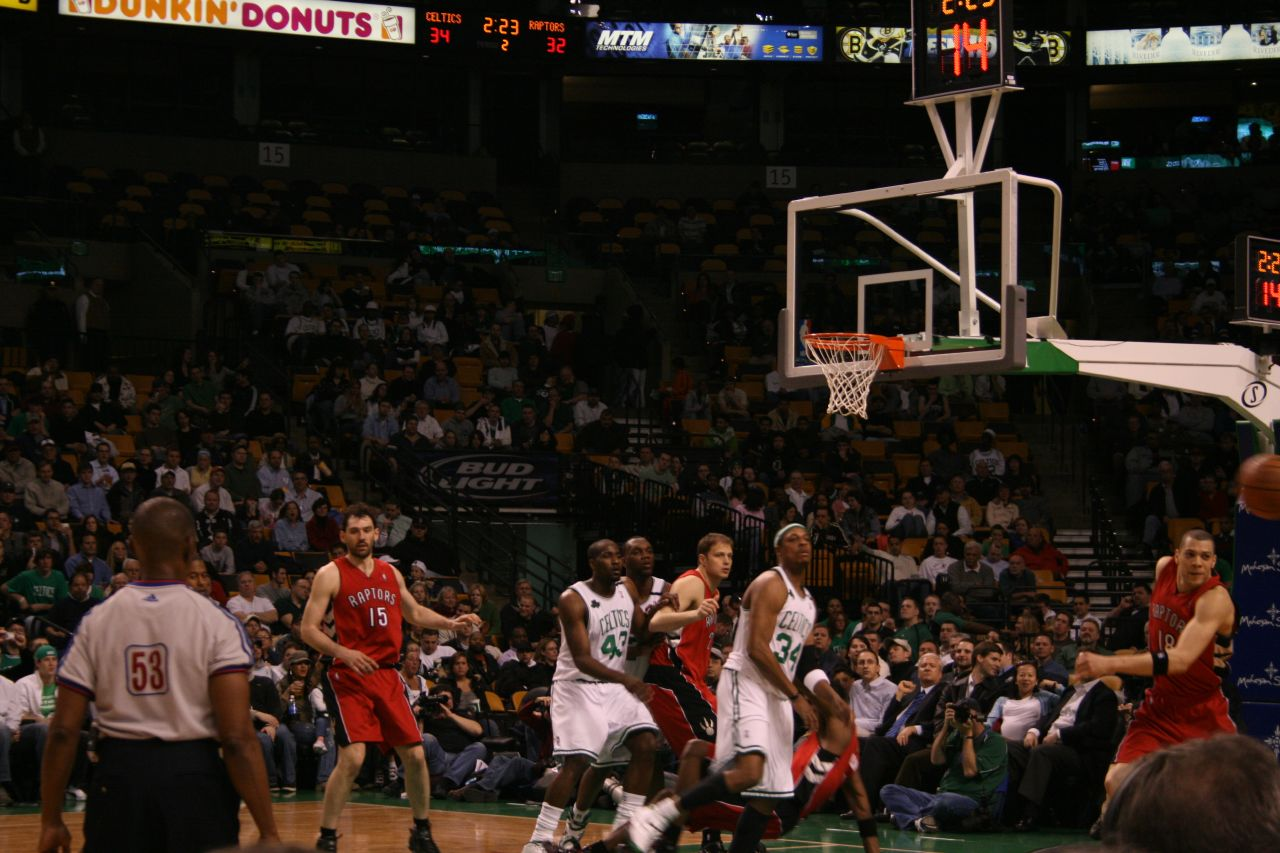
Anthony Parker (No. 18) and Jorge Garbajosa (No. 15) with the Raptors during the 2006–07 season. Parker and Garbajosa were signed by the Raptors in the 2006 off-season.

The first half of the season produced mixed results as Toronto struggled towards the .500 mark. After the All-Star break, Bargnani continued to work on his defence and shooting (averaging 14.3 points per game and 3.9 rebounds per game in 12 games for the month of February 2007), and he was selected as the Eastern Conference Rookie of the Month for the second straight time on March 1, 2007. Bargnani became the third Raptor ever to win the award twice, joining Vince Carter and Damon Stoudamire. Toronto ended the regular season with a 47–35 record, securing the third seed in the Eastern Conference for the 2007 NBA playoffs along with the Atlantic Division title, as well as homecourt advantage for the first time in franchise history. Bosh was voted to start in the 2007 NBA All-Star Game. The Raptors were also praised for their improved defence, ball-sharing and tremendous team chemistry. Colangelo, Gherardini and Mitchell were credited with Toronto's turnaround this season, which was one of the best in NBA history in terms of league standing and defensive ranking. Mitchell was subsequently named the 2006–07 NBA Coach of the Year, the first coach in Raptors history to receive the honour, while Colangelo was named 2006–07 Executive of the Year.

On April 24, 2007, the Raptors won their first playoff game in five seasons, with an 89–83 victory over the New Jersey Nets, but lost the series 4–2. The series was notable for pitting ex-Raptor Vince Carter against his former team. The Nets took home court advantage in Game 1, holding off a late Raptors rally in the fourth quarter. The Raptors pulled away in another tight game to even the series at one game apiece. When the series shifted to New Jersey, the Nets took charge of the series, winning Games 3 and 4 in routs. New Jersey had a chance to win the series in game 5 in Toronto, but the Raptors took a 20-point lead after one quarter. Still, New Jersey chipped away and had a chance to win the game, but Boštjan Nachbar's three-pointer missed at the buzzer. Needing to win in New Jersey to force a game 7, Toronto held a one-point lead with under a minute to play in game 6, but Richard Jefferson hit a layup with eight seconds left to play. Toronto attempted to try for the game-winning shot, but Jefferson intercepted a pass to seal the series for the Nets.

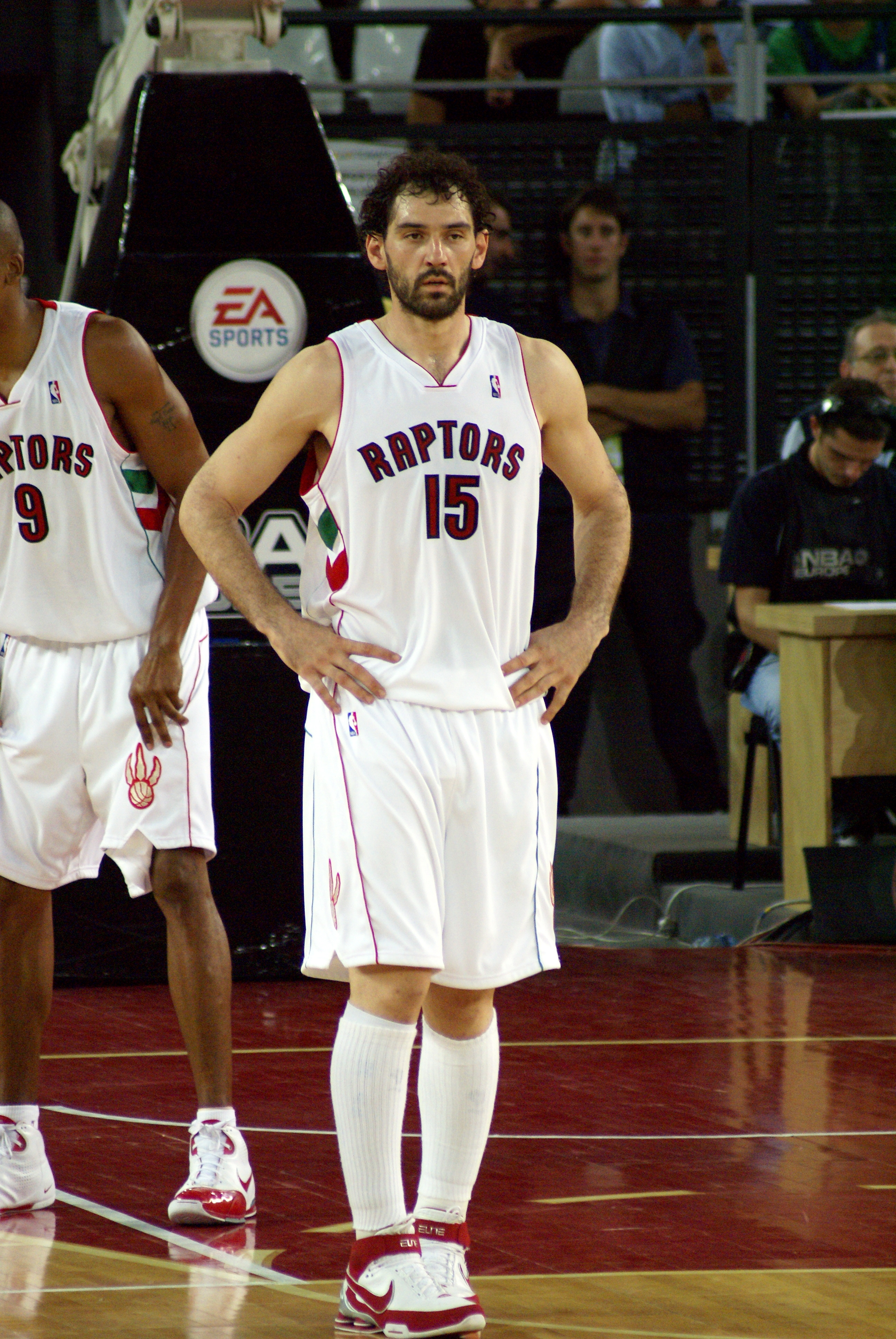
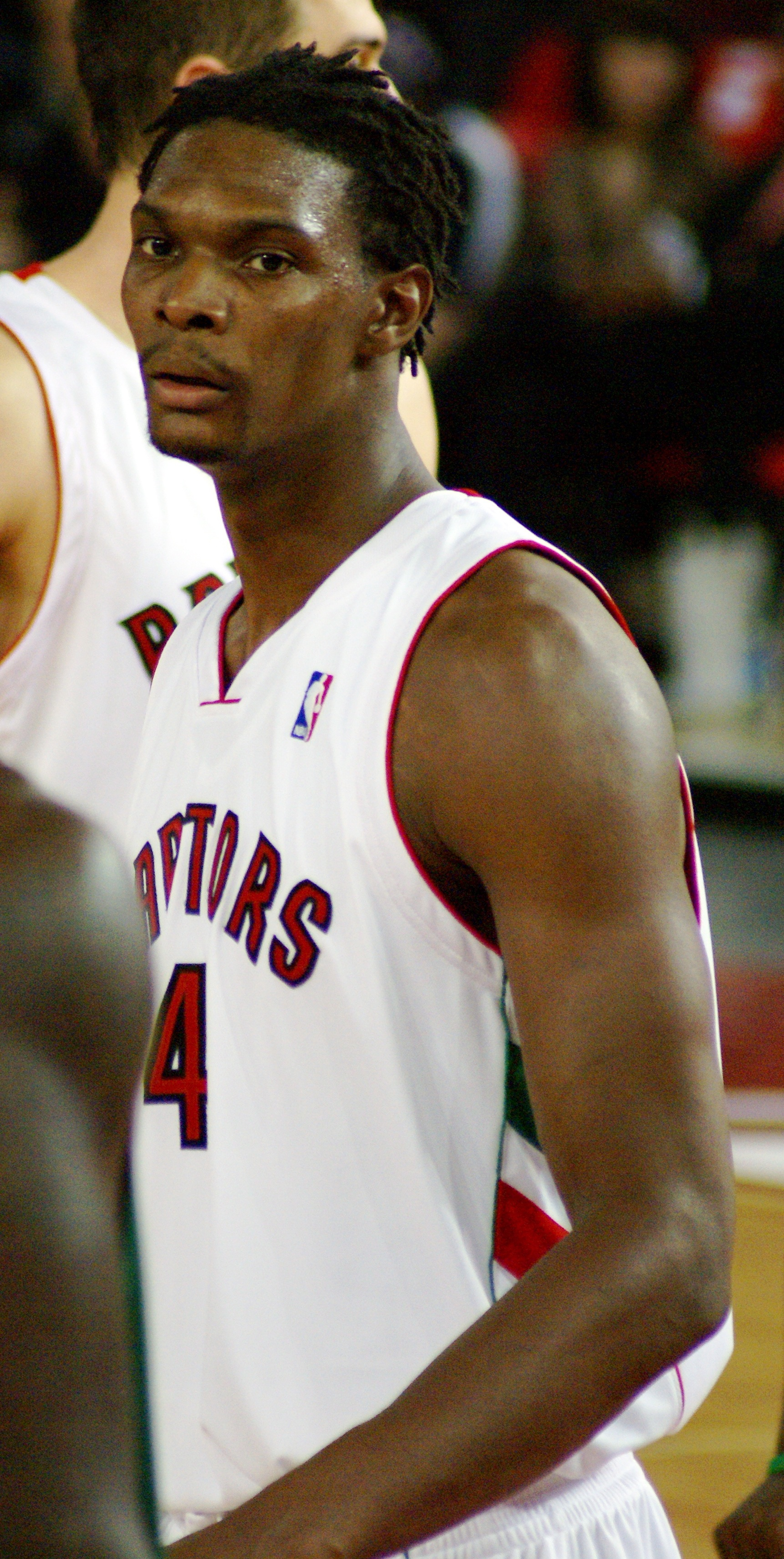
Jorge Garbajosa (left) and Chris Bosh (right) during the 2007–08 season. Injuries to both players during the season derailed the possibility for the Raptors to defend their 2007 Atlantic Division title.

Several changes to the roster were made before the 2007–08 campaign as Toronto sought to reproduce the same form as the previous campaign. Most notably, the Raptors acquired Carlos Delfino in a trade with Detroit for two second-round draft picks, and signed Jamario Moon and three-point specialist Jason Kapono as free agents. On the other hand, veteran swingman Morris Peterson joined the New Orleans Hornets. Despite being defending division champions, the Raptors were widely tipped as outside contenders for the division and conference titles. However, Toronto quickly fell behind Boston in the division, as Bargnani's inability to play well consistently, along with injuries to Garbajosa (75 games), Bosh (15 games) and Ford (31 games), derailed the possibility of a smooth campaign.

The Raptors finished 41–41, six fewer wins than the previous season, but still good enough for a playoff spot as the sixth seed. They were pitted against Dwight Howard and the resurgent Orlando Magic. In Game 1, Dwight Howard gave the Magic their first playoff win since 2003 as they practically led the entire game. Howard would put up a 29–20 in Game 2, as Hedo Türkoğlu scored the final four go-ahead points to give the Magic a 2–0 lead. The Raptors would respond with a strong Game 3 victory keyed by great point guard play from Ford and José Calderon. However, Jameer Nelson, Rashard Lewis and Keith Bogans keyed strong three-point shooting in Game 4 and overcame Bosh's 39 points and 15 rebounds to bring the Magic out of Toronto with a 3–1 lead. Howard would finish off the series in Game 5 as impressively as he started: 21 points, 21 rebounds, 3 blocks. Whereas the preceding season was considered a success, the 2007–08 campaign was considered a disappointment. Weaknesses in Toronto's game—rebounding, defence, and a lack of a swingman—were brought into sharp focus during the playoffs, and changes were expected to be made to the roster.

As it turned out, a blockbuster trade was agreed in principle before the 2008–09 campaign: six-time All-Star Jermaine O'Neal was acquired from the Indiana Pacers in exchange for Ford (who had become expendable with the emergence of Calderón), Rasho Nesterović, Maceo Baston, and Roy Hibbert, the 17th pick in the 2008 NBA draft, giving the Raptors a potential boost in the frontcourt. Meanwhile, Bargnani, who had spent the summer working on his interior game, was projected to come off the bench. The Raptors also introduced a black alternate road jersey for the season similar to the earlier purple design that was dropped a few seasons ago. It had a maple leaf featured on the back neck of the jersey, symbolizing the Raptors as "Canada's team". Despite the introduction of O'Neal, who brought home the rebounds and the blocks, and a much improved Bargnani, the Raptors were too inconsistent. Following an 8–9 start to the season, Mitchell was fired and replaced by long-time assistant Jay Triano. Triano tweaked the starting line-up to no avail as the Raptors fell to 21–34 by the All-Star break. O'Neal and Moon were then traded to Miami for Shawn Marion and Marcus Banks, but with the losses mounting, the Raptors soon fell out of the playoffs picture and were eliminated from contention with seven games of the regular season remaining. The Raptors eventually finished with a 33–49 record and headed into the next season with a potential overhaul of the core: Marion could become a free agent; Bosh could become one after 2009–10; Parker would soon turn 35; and Bargnani had his breakthrough season. On May 12, 2009, Triano was given a three-year term for the position of head coach.

The inevitable roster shakeup for the 2009–10 season began when Kapono was traded to the Philadelphia 76ers for the aggressive veteran forward Reggie Evans. Toronto then drafted DeMar DeRozan with the ninth pick, enabling them to fill a spot on the wings. This was followed by the signing of free agent Hedo Türkoğlu, which in turn led to a sign-and-trade agreement involving four teams, with Toronto landing wing players Devean George (later traded for Marco Belinelli) and Antoine Wright, while releasing Marion, Kris Humphries and Nathan Jawai. Around the same time, Parker headed for the Cleveland Cavaliers, while Indiana point guard Jarrett Jack was added and Nesterovič brought back to provide cover for the big men. Finally, Delfino and Ukić were moved to the Milwaukee Bucks for Amir Johnson and Sonny Weems. It became increasingly clear that Colangelo, in securing a credible nucleus for the future, was doing this to persuade Bosh to stay beyond 2010. While the Raptors were off to a sluggish start, they picked up the pace around the All-Star break, reaching a season-high seven games above .500 and standing fifth in the Eastern Conference. Bosh was recording career-highs in points and rebounds per game. However, a season-ending injury to Bosh after the break coincided with Toronto's descent down the standings from the fifth seed to the eighth, and they ultimately relinquished their spot to Chicago a few games before the regular season ended.

=== 2010–2013: Rebuilding ===
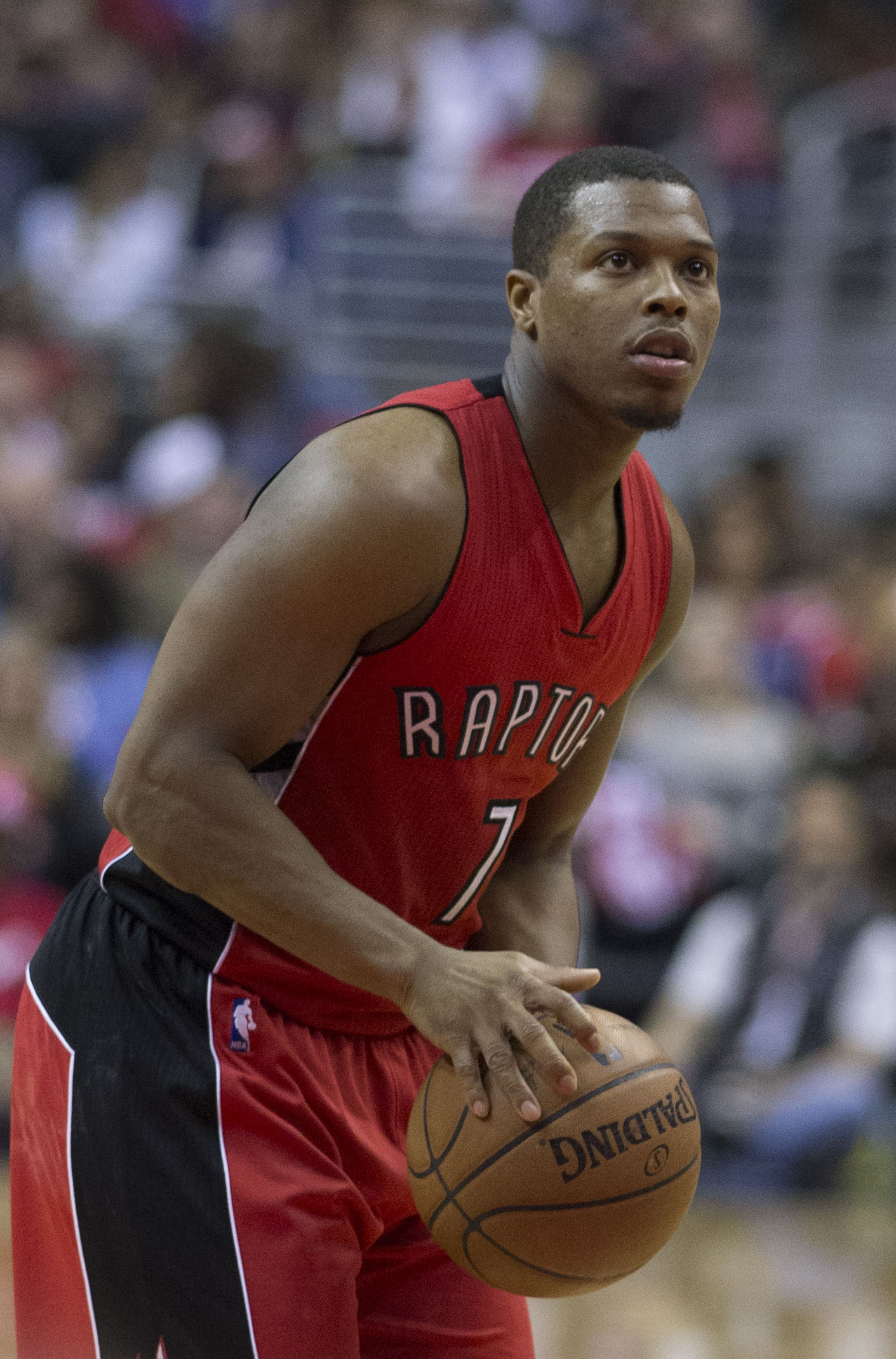
Kyle Lowry was acquired by the Raptors in a trade with the Houston Rockets during the 2012 off-season

Before the 2010–11 season began, there was much anticipation around the league over the fates of an elite pack of free agents, featuring the likes of Bosh, Dwyane Wade, LeBron James, and Amar'e Stoudemire. Bosh and James eventually chose to join Wade in Miami, and the sign-and-trade transaction that ensued resulted in the Raptors receiving two first-round draft picks and a trade exception from Miami. Before that, Toronto had drafted Ed Davis, also a left-handed power forward like Bosh. After Bosh left, Colangelo sought to trade Calderón, Evans and the disenchanted Türkoğlu for Tyson Chandler, Leandro Barbosa, and Boris Diaw, but the trade involving Chandler collapsed at the last minute, as Chandler was traded to the Dallas Mavericks instead. Belinelli was then traded to New Orleans Hornets for Julian Wright, and 13 games into the season, Jack, David Andersen, and Marcus Banks to New Orleans for Peja Stojaković and Jerryd Bayless. Bosh's first return to Toronto was received to a chorus of boos, but not as nearly as harsh as what former Raptors Tracy McGrady and Vince Carter received upon their respective returns. Without Bosh, Toronto as a team regressed and were only able to secure 22 wins in the regular season.

Dwane Casey, an assistant coach with the Mavericks, was hired as the new head coach of Toronto before the 2011–12 season. The Raptors used their number five pick to select Jonas Valančiūnas, a centre from Lithuania in the 2011 NBA draft. The season was shortened by 16 regular season games due to the 2011 NBA lockout, and the Raptors finished the season with a 23–43 record. During the 2012 off-season, Colangelo tried to lure Canadian free agent and two-time MVP Steve Nash, who had become a free agent after playing for the Phoenix Suns, to play for the Raptors. When Nash joined the Los Angeles Lakers instead, the Raptors acquired point guard Kyle Lowry from the Houston Rockets for a future first-round pick. Lowry, combined with Valančiūnas and the eighth pick in the 2012 draft Terrence Ross, represented the next phase of the re-building process. On January 30, 2013, the Raptors acquired Memphis Grizzlies star Rudy Gay and centre Hamed Haddadi as well as Pistons player Austin Daye in a three-way deal that sent Calderón to the Detroit Pistons and Davis, along with Pistons veteran Tayshaun Prince and a second-round pick to the Grizzlies. Haddadi was later traded, along with a second-round pick, to Phoenix in exchange for guard Sebastian Telfair. The 2012–13 season was the first season since 2009–10 that the Raptors finished the season with a winning home record (21–20), despite their overall losing record (34–48).

=== 2013–2025: The Masai Ujiri era ===
==== 2013–2018: The DeRozan and Lowry era ====
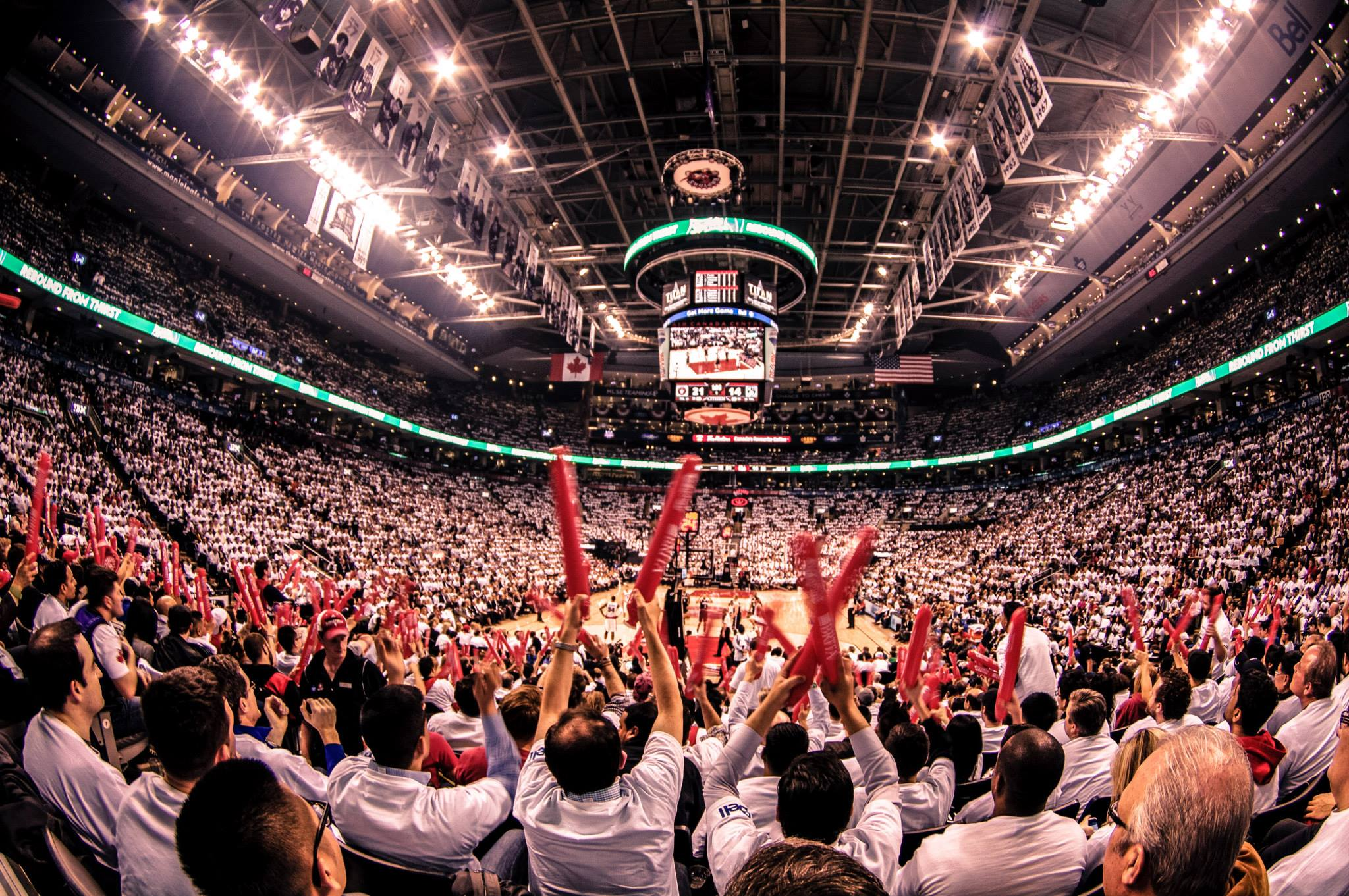
The Air Canada Centre during the 2014 first-round playoffs between the Raptors and the Brooklyn Nets

During the 2013 off-season, new general manager Masai Ujiri traded Bargnani to the New York Knicks for Marcus Camby, Steve Novak, Quentin Richardson, a future first-round draft pick, and two future second-round picks; Camby and Richardson were both waived shortly after the trade. The Raptors also added Tyler Hansbrough, D. J. Augustin, Dwight Buycks, and Austin Daye via free agency. On December 9, 2013, the Raptors traded Rudy Gay, Quincy Acy, and Aaron Gray to the Sacramento Kings for John Salmons, Greivis Vásquez, Patrick Patterson, and Chuck Hayes, and waived Augustin.

During the 2013–14 season, the Raptors were 6–12 before the Rudy Gay trade; after the trade they went on a 10–3 run, as they maintained their lead in the division and rose above the .500 mark for the first time in almost three years. The Raptors entered the All-Star break with a 28–24 record, and DeRozan was also selected to play in the All-Star game, being only the fourth ever Raptor to do so. On March 28, 2014, the Raptors clinched a playoff berth for the first time since 2008 after beating the Boston Celtics, 105–103. On April 11, 2014, the Raptors lost to the New York Knicks, 108–100, but since the division rival Brooklyn Nets lost to the Atlanta Hawks the same night, the Raptors became Atlantic Division champions for the first time since 2007. They finished the regular season with a franchise-high 48 wins (.585), going 42–22 (.656) after the Gay trade, the third-best record in the Eastern Conference. The Raptors faced the Nets in the first round of the playoffs for the first time since 2007, when the Nets were located in New Jersey. Toronto nearly advanced to the next round, but Paul Pierce blocked a potential game-winner by Lowry in Game 7.

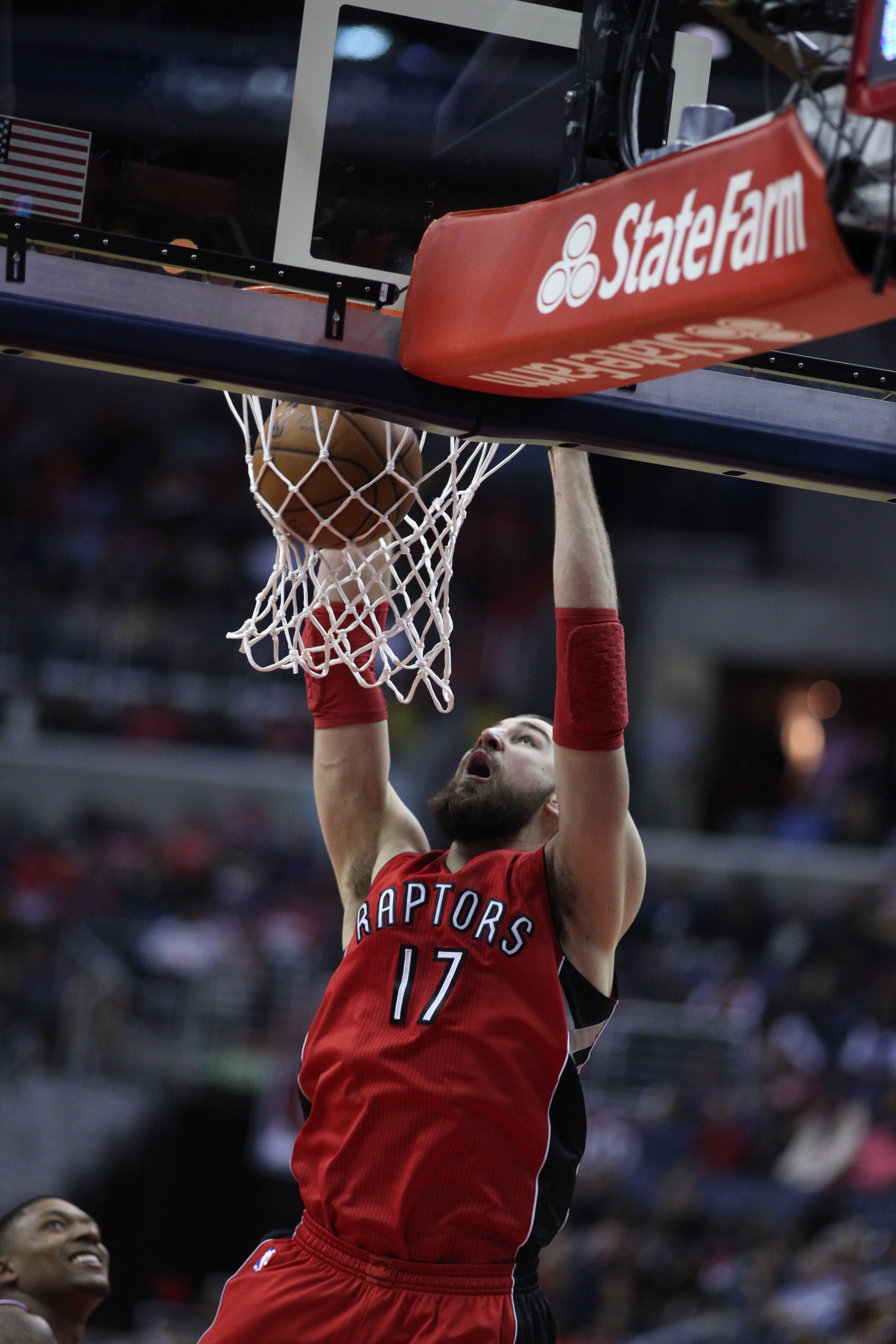
Jonas Valančiūnas with the Raptors in the first round of the 2015 playoffs against the Washington Wizards

During the 2014–15 season, the Raptors were off to their best start in franchise history: a then-Eastern Conference-leading 24–8 record by the end of 2014. On March 27, 2015, the Raptors clinched the Atlantic division title with a 94–83 win over the Los Angeles Lakers. This was the second consecutive year that the Raptors clinched the Atlantic Division title. On April 11, 2015, the Raptors beat the Miami Heat, Toronto's first road win over the Heat since November 19, 2008, ending a ten-game slide on Miami's home floor. The win was Toronto's 48th of the season and 22nd on the road, both tying franchise records. Four days later, the Raptors broke their franchise record with their 49th win of the season. After the 2014–15 season, Louis Williams won the NBA Sixth Man of the Year Award, becoming the first Raptor to do so. The Raptors faced the Washington Wizards in the first round of the 2015 playoffs and lost four straight games as the Wizards swept the Raptors.

On June 25, 2015, the Raptors selected Delon Wright with their first-round pick in the 2015 NBA draft, along with Norman Powell in the second round. On June 29, the Raptors announced their new NBA G League (then known as the NBA D-League) team, the Mississauga-based Raptors 905, which began play in the 2015–16 season; the team is named after the area code the team represents. The Raptors added DeMarre Carroll, Cory Joseph, Bismack Biyombo, and Luis Scola via free agency.

The Raptors opened a new practice facility, the OVO Athletic Centre, originally known as the BioSteel Centre, in Exhibition Place, on February 10, 2016. The Raptors hosted the 2016 NBA All-Star Game on February 14, 2016, and its associated weekend for the first time in its history. With a 105–97 win at home against the Atlanta Hawks on March 30, 2016, the Raptors attained their first-ever 50-win season. The following day the Raptors clinched the Atlantic Division title for the third consecutive season as a result of a Boston Celtics loss against the Portland Trail Blazers. The 56–26 record became the best Raptors regular season ever, fourth overall in the league and second only to the Cleveland Cavaliers in the Eastern Conference. Entering the 2016 playoffs as the East's second seed, the Raptors were pushed to seven games by the Indiana Pacers, but won their first playoff series in 15 years. Another seven-game series against the Miami Heat ensued, which Toronto also won. The Raptors, who were one of the four teams that never reached the NBA Conference Finals in their histories, appeared in the third round for the first time in their twenty-first season, facing the Cleveland Cavaliers, in which they ultimately lost the series 4–2. The Cavaliers advanced to the NBA Finals and became champions.

In preparation for their title push, the Raptors conducted a series of trades, including on February 14, 2017, when Terrence Ross and a first-round pick were traded for Serge Ibaka from the Orlando Magic, and on February 23, 2017, when Jared Sullinger and two second-round picks were traded for PJ Tucker. During the 2017 NBA playoffs, the third-seeded Raptors defeated the Milwaukee Bucks during the first round 4–2, but lost to the defending champions Cavaliers in the second round 4–0.

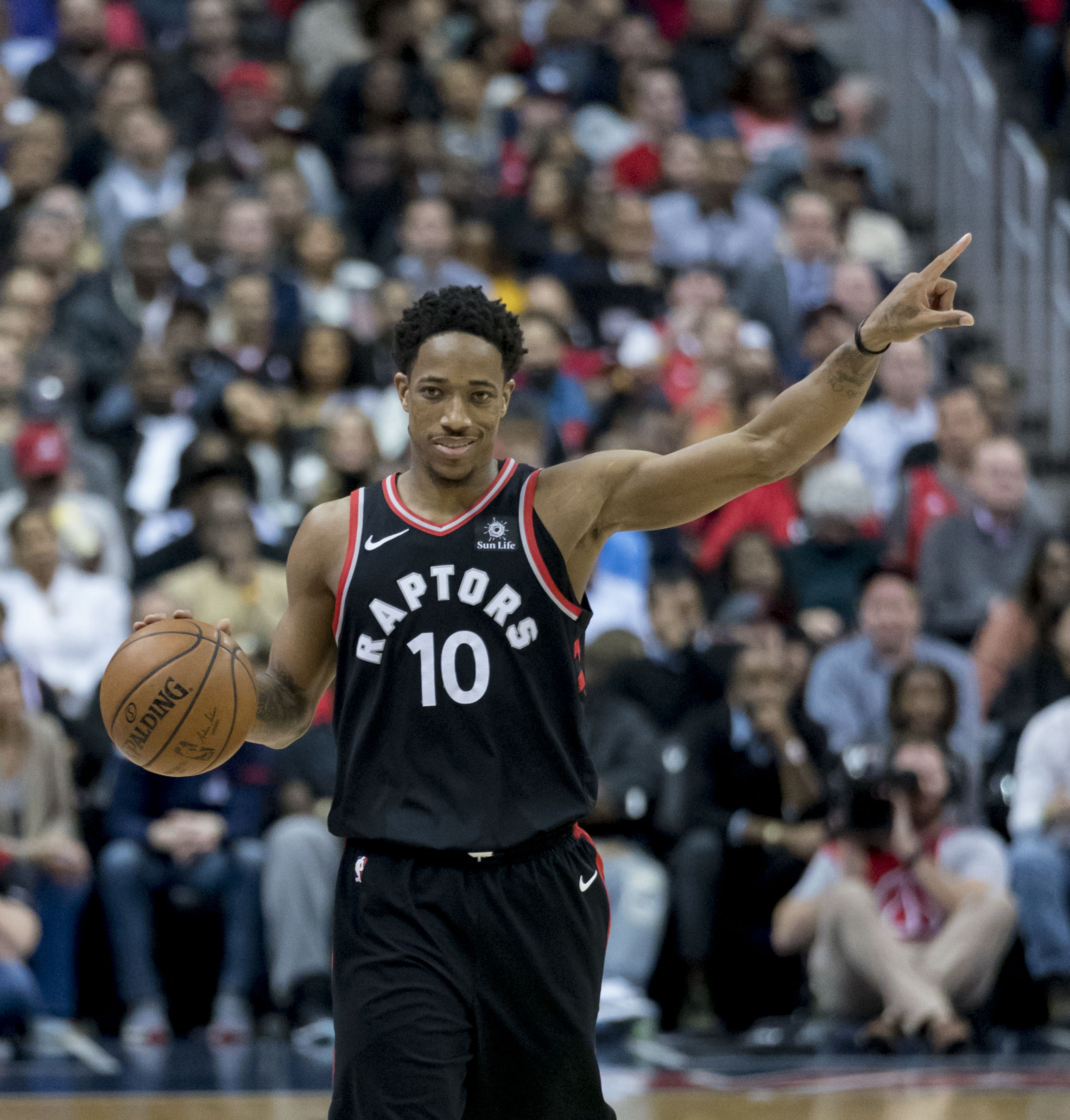
On January 1, 2018, DeMar DeRozan scored a franchise-record 52 points against the Milwaukee Bucks.

On January 1, 2018, DeMar DeRozan scored a franchise-record 52 points to help the Raptors beat the Milwaukee Bucks 131–127 in overtime, matching the team record with their 12th consecutive home victory. DeRozan became the third player in Raptors history to score 50 or more in a single game—the others being Vince Carter and Terrence Ross, who each had 51. On March 7, 2018, Toronto became the first team in the league to clinch a playoff spot in the 2017–18 season, with a 121–119 overtime win over the Detroit Pistons in Detroit, and set a new franchise record in earliest playoff qualification, doing so in only their 64th game of the season. On April 6, 2018, the Raptors became Eastern Conference regular season champions, securing the number one seed for the first time in franchise history with a 92–73 win over the Indiana Pacers, in the process also setting new records for single-season wins at 57 and home wins with 33, with three games remaining on the schedule. The Raptors finished the regular season with a franchise-record 59 wins, which was the second-best overall in the league behind only the Houston Rockets.

The Raptors faced off the Washington Wizards in the first round of the 2018 NBA playoffs, a rematch of the 2015 playoffs. The Raptors defeated the Wizards 4–2. The Raptors were swept by the Cleveland Cavaliers in the second round, becoming the first number one seed to get swept before the Conference Finals since 1969. Despite winning Coach of the Year, Casey was subsequently fired as coach on May 11. Nick Nurse was promoted to replace Casey as head coach on June 14.

==== 2018–2019: First championship season ====
Toronto's roster underwent two major changes during the 2018–19 season. First, on July 18, DeRozan was traded, along with Jakob Pöltl and a protected 2019 first-round draft pick, to the San Antonio Spurs in exchange for Kawhi Leonard and Danny Green. Leonard was a two-time All-Star and two-time Defensive Player of the Year, but owing to the short length of his contract, there was uncertainty over his longer-term future with the franchise. Secondly, during the trade deadline, the Raptors traded Jonas Valančiūnas, Delon Wright, C. J. Miles, and a 2024 second-round draft pick to the Memphis Grizzlies for Marc Gasol—another multiple All-Star and former Defensive Player of the Year—and signed Jeremy Lin shortly thereafter. The Raptors got off to a 6–0 start, a franchise record. Winning their 16th game on November 23, the Raptors broke their franchise record for the best start through 20 games with a 16–4 record. They reached the 20-win mark quicker than any time in their history when they won the 24th game of their season on December 1 against the Cleveland Cavaliers in Cleveland. On January 13, 2019, the Toronto Raptors broke the record for most points scored in franchise history after beating the Washington Wizards in Washington 140–138 points after double overtime.

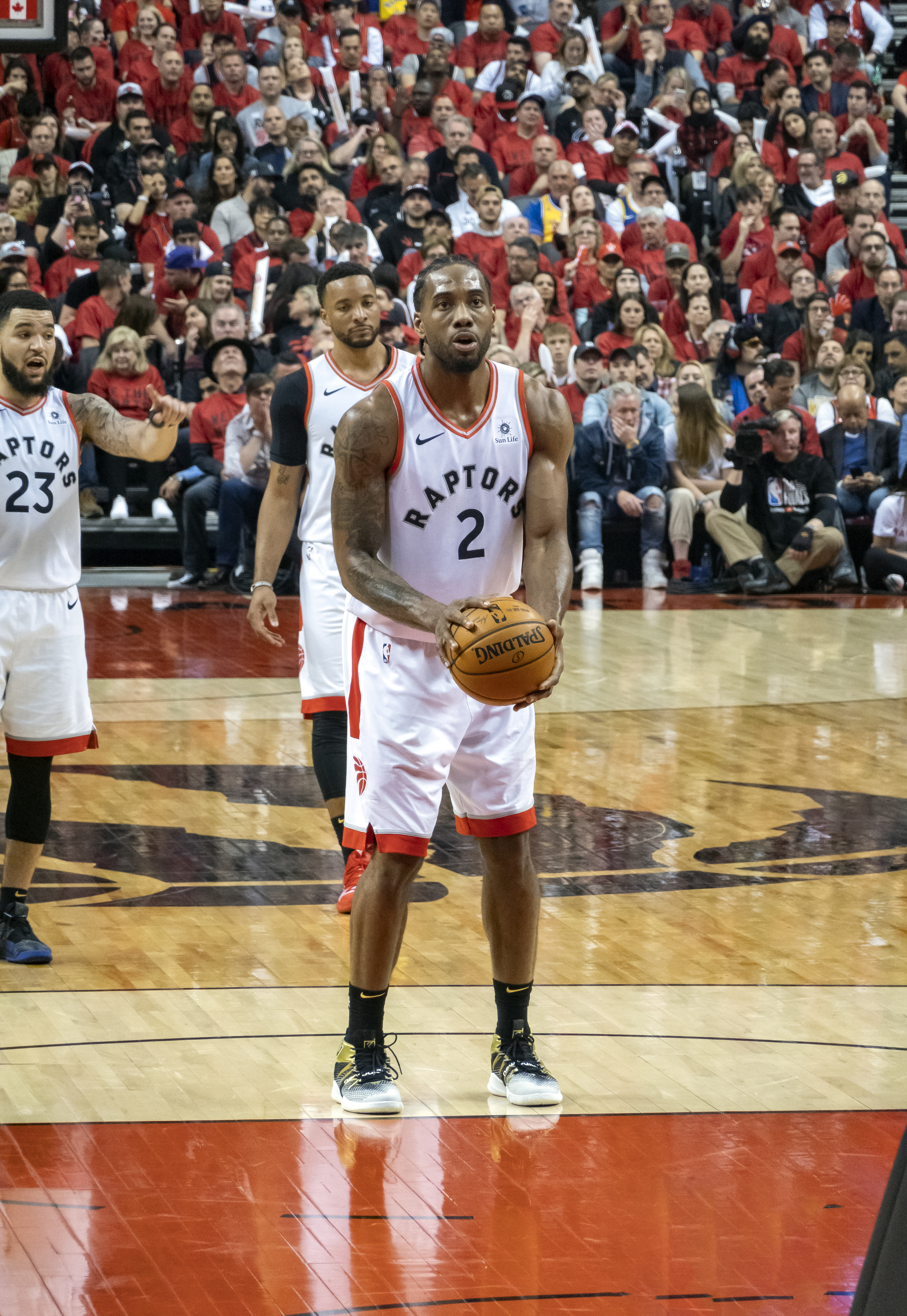
Kawhi Leonard prepares to take a free throw during Game 2 of the 2019 Finals; Leonard would later return to the Raptors in 2026 via trade with the Clippers

Despite resting Leonard for more than 20 games due to his injury from the previous season, the Raptors finished the regular season with the second seed in the East, and the second-best record in the league behind the Milwaukee Bucks. The Raptors faced the Orlando Magic in the first round of the 2019 playoffs, defeating them in five games. In the following round, the Raptors defeated the Philadelphia 76ers in a tightly contested seven-game series. In the closing seconds of Game 7 with the game tied, Leonard hit the game-winning 15-foot buzzer-beater to lift the Raptors to a 92–90 victory—the first Game 7 buzzer beater in NBA playoff history. They went on to face the Bucks in the Eastern Conference Finals. After losing the first two games in Milwaukee, Toronto won the next four, advancing to the NBA Finals for the first time in franchise history, and their opponents were the two-time defending champions Golden State Warriors. The Warriors, which were making their fifth consecutive finals appearance and featured multiple All-Stars, including the Splash Brothers Stephen Curry (son of former Raptor Dell Curry) and Klay Thompson, were favourites to win. However, the Raptors earned their first championship by defeating the Warriors 4–2, with Leonard being named Finals MVP. In doing so, the Raptors became the first team based outside the United States to win the NBA title (and the Larry O'Brien Championship Trophy) and the first team based outside the United States to win a championship in any of the four major North American sports leagues since the Toronto Blue Jays won the World Series in 1993, ending a 25-year-long drought from Canada-based major professional sports teams.

==== 2019–2021: Pandemic-shortened seasons ====
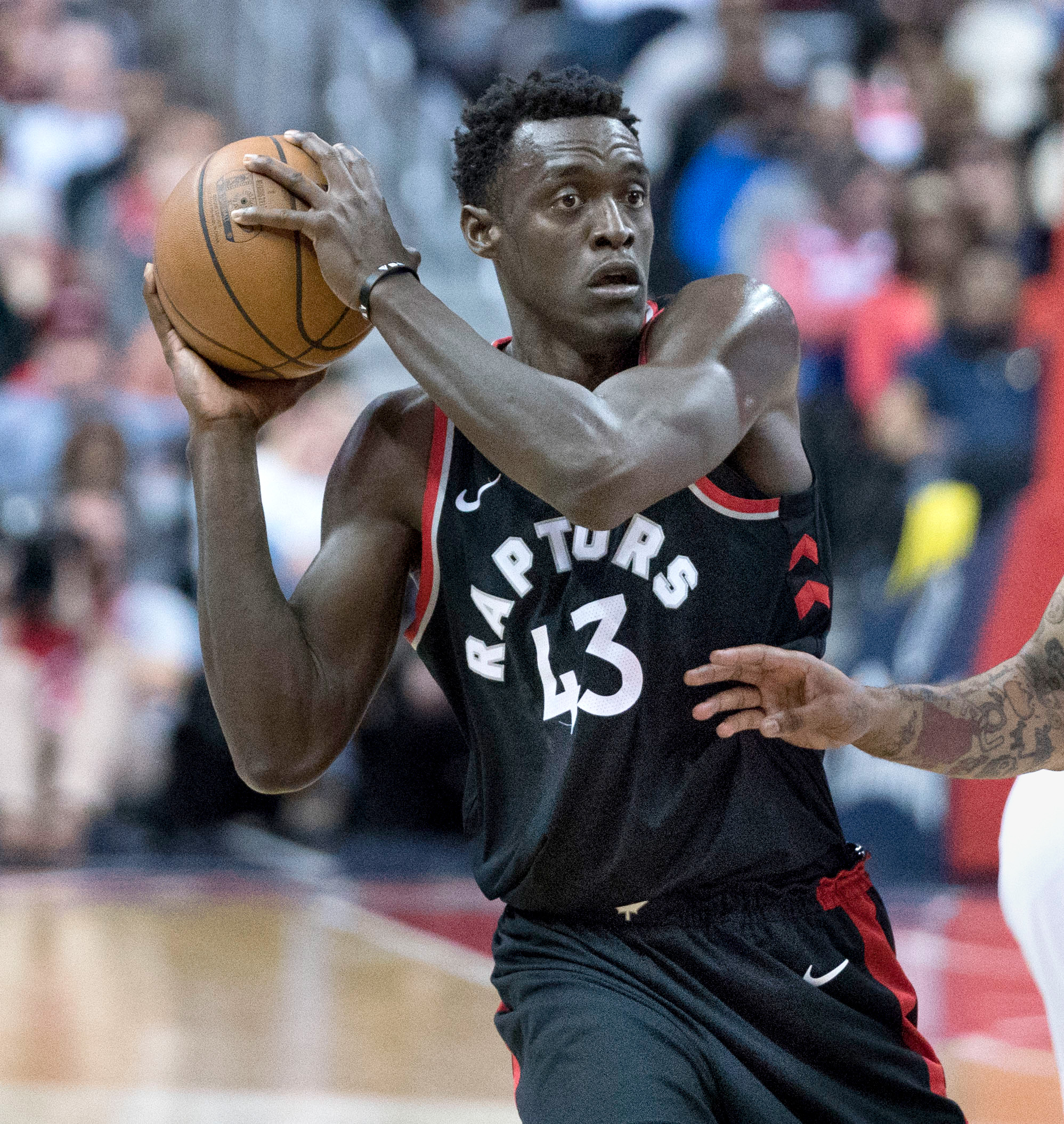
In the 2019–20 NBA season, Pascal Siakam was named as a starter in the 2020 NBA All-Star Game and a part of the All-NBA Second Team.

The fear that Leonard would depart after only one season materialized when he signed with the Los Angeles Clippers. Nonetheless, the Raptors managed to win 53 games in a season shortened by the COVID-19 pandemic to secure the second seed and the second best record in the league. Their winning percentage (73.6 per cent) was the best in franchise history, with the season also seeing Nurse being named as Coach of the Year; additionally, Pascal Siakam made his first All-NBA Second Team, as well as being a starter in the 2020 NBA All-Star Game as well as Kyle Lowry making his sixth consecutive all-star selection. In the playoffs—which began later than usual in August, at the "Bubble" in Walt Disney World in Bay Lake, Florida near Orlando—the Raptors defeated the Brooklyn Nets 4–0 in the first round. They went down 0–2 against the Boston Celtics in the next round, before OG Anunoby scored a buzzer-beater to win Toronto the third game. The series eventually went to seven games, with Boston prevailing.

Due to travel restrictions imposed by the Canadian government in response to the COVID-19 pandemic, the Raptors were unable to host games in Toronto and played their home games for the 2020–21 season at Amalie Arena in Tampa, Florida. On February 28, 2021, due to NBA's COVID-19 Health and Safety Protocols, the Raptors suffered their first postponement, in a scheduled game versus the Chicago Bulls, At the time, the Raptors were fourth in the East. They did not play again until March 3, but with five players missing due to the safety protocols, including Siakam, Anunoby, Lowry and Fred VanVleet, as well as head coach Nurse, resulting the Raptors to tank, Toronto lost 129–105 to the Detroit Pistons. The Raptors ultimately missed the playoffs for the first time in eight years. For the 2021 NBA draft, the Raptors jumped up to the fourth pick after having the seventh-best odds in the 2021 NBA draft lottery. With the fourth pick in the 2021 NBA draft, the Raptors selected guard/forward Scottie Barnes from Florida State.

==== 2021–2024: The Pascal Siakam era ====
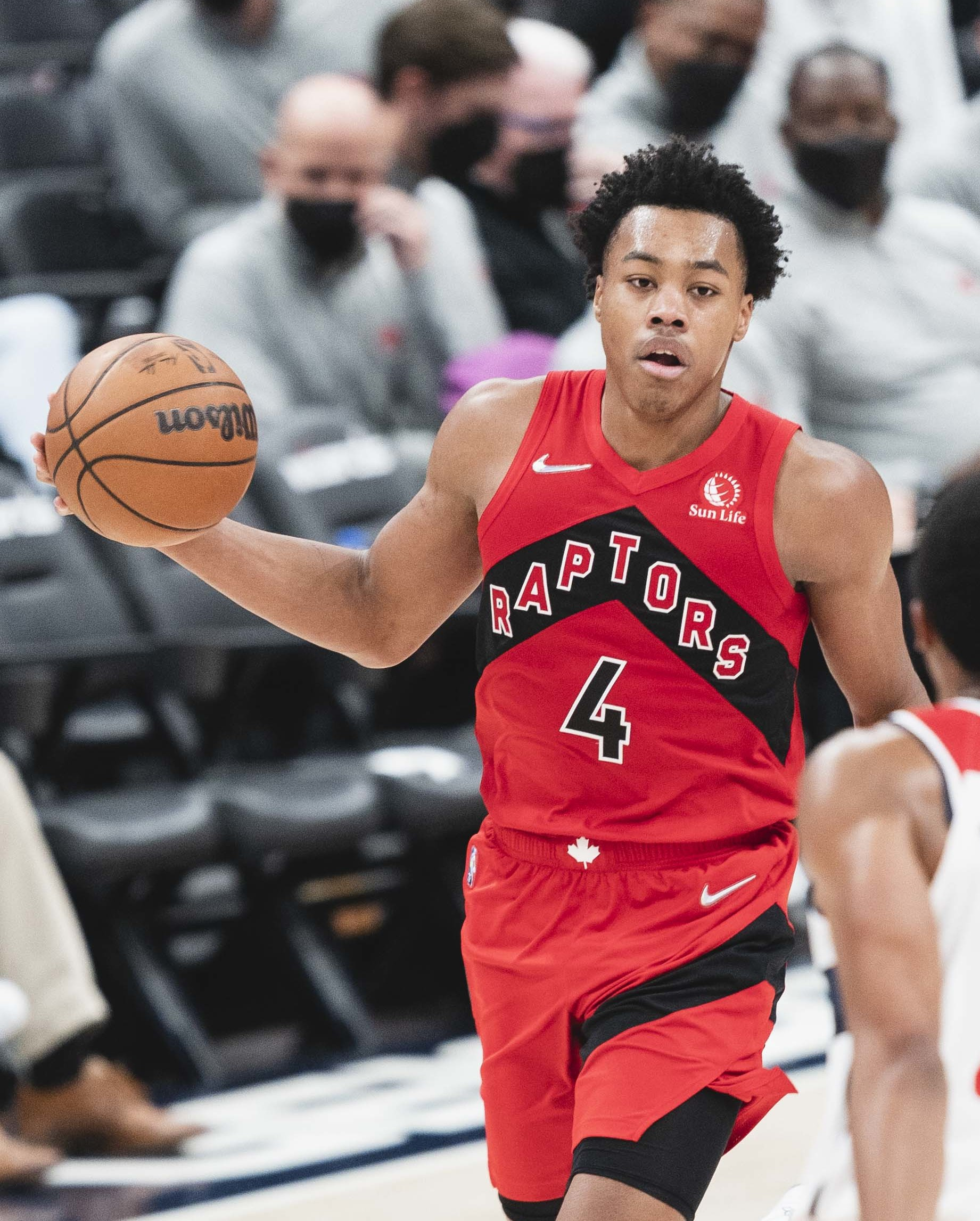
Scottie Barnes, selected fourth overall in the 2021 NBA draft, was named the 2022 NBA Rookie of the Year and became the face of the franchise in 2024.

Before the 2021–22 season, the Raptors signed and traded Lowry to the Miami Heat for Goran Dragić and Precious Achiuwa. On September 10, 2021, the Canadian government allowed the Raptors to return to Scotiabank Arena for the first time since March 2020, requiring spectators to show a proof of COVID-19 vaccination to attend. Despite a multitude of injuries to key players, the Raptors won 48 games to return to the postseason, entering the 2022 NBA playoffs as the fifth seed in the Eastern Conference. However, the Raptors would lose to the Philadelphia 76ers in the first round in six games, after going down 0–3 to start the series. Siakam was named to his second All-NBA Team, tying Vince Carter and Demar DeRozan for the most All-NBA selections in Raptors history. Scottie Barnes, whom the Raptors had selected fourth overall in the 2021 NBA draft, was named the 2022 NBA Rookie of the Year.

On April 21, 2023, after the Raptors were eliminated from the Play-in tournament by the Chicago Bulls, the Raptors fired head coach Nurse. The rest of Nurse's coaching staff were also fired. On June 13, 2023, Darko Rajaković, a former Memphis Grizzlies assistant coach, was hired as the Raptors head coach, replacing Nurse.

On December 30, 2023, the Raptors traded OG Anunoby, along with Precious Achiuwa and Malachi Flynn to the New York Knicks in exchange for RJ Barrett, Immanuel Quickley and a 2024 2nd-round pick.

==== 2024–present: The Scottie Barnes era ====
On January 17, 2024, the Raptors traded Pascal Siakam to the Indiana Pacers for Bruce Brown, Jordan Nwora, Kira Lewis Jr. and three first-round picks. Injuries to Scottie Barnes and other key players saw the Raptors tank for the remainder of the year, ultimately finishing at the bottom of the Atlantic Division and 12th in the Eastern Conference. Despite the injuries, Scottie Barnes represented Toronto in the All-Star Game.

On February 6, 2025, the Raptors acquired forward Brandon Ingram from the New Orleans Pelicans in exchange for Kelly Olynyk, Bruce Brown, a 2026 first-round pick, and a 2031 second-round pick.

Shortly after the 2025 NBA Finals, the Raptors did not re-sign Ujiri. His basketball duties were subsequently transferred to Raptors general Bobby Webster, who also was promoted to head of basketball operations.

During the 2026 trade deadline, the Raptors traded for Chris Paul, who would retire soon after the trade, allowing the Raptors to have greater roster flexibility. The Raptors reached the first round of the 2026 NBA playoffs but lost a close series in seven games to the Cleveland Cavaliers.

On June 30, 2026, it was reported that the Raptors and Los Angeles Clippers had agreed to a potential trade involving Kawhi Leonard. The Raptors indicated on July 9, that it would await the conclusion of the salary cap investigation involving Leonard and the Clippers before proceeding with the trade. On September 2, the NBA concluded its investigation and levied multiple penalties, including a $700,000 fine for Leonard. On September 14, Leonard's trade back to the Raptors was finalized under the original terms. Shortly after the trade, Leonard signed a contract extension with the Raptors.

== Season-by-season record ==
List of the last five seasons completed by the Raptors. For the full season-by-season history, see List of Toronto Raptors seasons.

Note: GP = Games played, W = Wins, L = Losses, W–L% = Winning percentage

Season	GP	W	L	W–L%	Finish	Playoffs
2021–22	82	48	34	.585	3rd, Atlantic	Lost in first round, 2–4 (76ers)
2022–23	82	41	41	.500	5th, Atlantic	Did not qualify
2023–24	82	25	57	.305	5th, Atlantic	Did not qualify
2024–25	82	30	52	.366	3rd, Atlantic	Did not qualify
2025–26	82	46	36	.561	3rd, Atlantic	Lost in first round, 3–4 (Cavaliers)

== Logos and uniforms ==
=== Logos ===
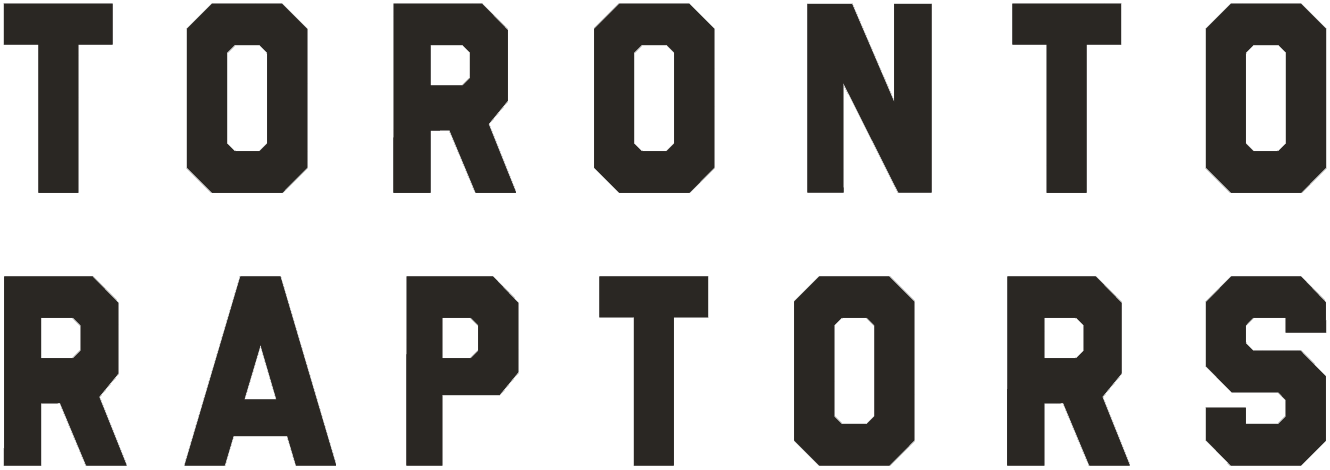
Wordmark logo for the Raptors (2015–present)

Fueled by the success of the Jurassic Park film and the popularity of non-avian dinosaurs with younger audiences, who would grow up to be fans of the franchise, the team's first logo originally featured an aggressive-looking, featherless red Velociraptor wearing white sneakers with exposed toe-claws dribbling a silver-coloured basketball. The team's original colours were purple, bright red, black and "Naismith silver" (in honour of the Canadian inventor of basketball, James Naismith). The logo proved to be very popular among fans, as by the end of 1994, the Raptors were seventh in the league in merchandise sales. For the 2008−09 season, the franchise dropped the colour purple from the original logo, making bright red the predominant colour in both the logo and the team's jerseys.

On December 19, 2014, the Toronto Raptors unveiled a new primary logo, which the team described as "a circular shield with a ball torn by the unmistakable attack of a Raptor".

==== Court art ====
The Toronto Raptors used various court art over the team's existence. For retro games, the Raptors used the Toronto Huskies logo, given that the Raptors are among the newest NBA teams and the Huskies are the Raptors' unofficial geographical predecessor. Beginning in early 2018, in some games, the Raptors use the Welcome Toronto logo, as the Raptors have strong connections with Toronto-based rapper Drake, as well as the 3D Raptors logo. Scotiabank subsidiary Tangerine Bank's name and logo are printed on the court as well (Tangerine Bank was formerly ING Direct Canada, until Scotiabank purchased the company in 2012 and re-branded it in 2013).

The Raptors have their own court art specifically for the NBA Cup games.

=== Uniforms ===
==== Uniform evolution ====
The uniforms the Raptors unveiled before the 1995–96 season, and wore until 1999, had black and white tears as pinstripes, edgy asymmetric lettering, a raptor claw on one side of the shorts, a raptor biting the 'T' of the 'TR' franchise acronym on the other side; and featured a red giant and aggressive Velociraptor dribbling a basketball (as depicted on the franchise logo) in the middle of the jersey. The Raptors unveiled these new jerseys in 1999−2000, launching a unique road jersey that had a purple front and a black back. In 2003−04, the Raptors introduced a solid red alternate that would become the main road jersey in 2006−07 onward as purple was dropped from the team's colour scheme. From the 2008−09 season through the 2014−15 season, the Raptors unveiled their alternate black road uniforms, which were actually worn as often as the primary red ones.

1995−1998

Home	Road

Source: jerseymuseum.org

1999−2006

Home	Road	2003–05 Alt.

Source: jerseymuseum.org

2006−2015

Home	Road	2008 Road Alt.

Source: jerseymuseum.org

==== 2015 redesign ====
On August 3, 2015, the Toronto Raptors unveiled four new uniforms. The uniforms were released in partnership with 2K Sports' NBA 2K16 video game. The team said in a press release that the new uniform designs were intended to pay tribute to the city of Toronto and to Canada as a whole, noting that the Raptors were the sole Canadian club in the NBA since the Grizzlies' move from Vancouver to Memphis. The main colours would remain centred on Canada's national colours of red and white, whereas black and silver will continue to be used for trim on the white home and red road uniforms. The uniforms themselves underwent changes. Most notably, the chevrons on the side panels now point up, which the team said aligns with its current slogan of "We The North". Since being introduced as a uniform accent in 1999, the chevrons had pointed downward, the team said. In addition, at the waist-level hem of the jersey is an upside-down tag with the team's "We The North" slogan. The team said the slogan on the tag will be visible to players when they tuck in their jerseys. Additionally, the shorts now feature a maple leaf logo on the front of the waistband, and the letter "T" is now on the sides of the shorts with the Raptors' basketball claw logo below it. This is a reference to the city of Toronto's "T-Dot" nickname. The Raptors also have an alternate road uniform based on Drake's October's Very Own (OVO) Sound record label.

2015−2017

Home	Road	Road Alt.	Road (OVO)

Source: jerseymuseum.org

==== 2017 onward ====
In 2017, as part of the NBA's partnership with Nike, each team was allotted four primary uniforms, classified as "editions". The Raptors made small changes to their regular home (now called "Association edition") and road (now the "Icon edition") uniforms, as well as their alternate ("Statement edition") uniforms. In addition, each franchise was also given new "City edition" uniforms, conceived by Nike as a way of commemorating each of the NBA teams' city history and pride. For the 2018–19 season, the Raptors were one of the franchises awarded "Earned edition" uniforms, by virtue of qualifying in the 2018 playoffs. The 2021−22 version of the "City edition" brought back the original Velociraptor, albeit in black and gold and facing the opposite direction.

Primary uniforms

(2017−2020)

Association	Icon	Statement

Source: jerseymuseum.org

(2020−)

Association	Icon	Statement

Source: jerseymuseum.org

City editions (2017−)

2017−18	2018−19	2019−20	2020−21	2021−22

Source: jerseymuseum.org

Earned editions (2018−)

2018−19	2020−21

Source: jerseymuseum.org

==== Jersey sponsors ====
In the 2017 off-season, the Raptors announced that Toronto-based Sun Life Financial is the team's jersey sponsor starting in the 2017–18 season.

==== Throwback and other jerseys ====
On December 8, 2009, the Raptors introduced a blue-and-white throwback jersey to commemorate the Toronto Huskies of the Basketball Association of America (BAA), regarded by many as the unofficial, geographical predecessor of the Raptors. The uniforms were the same as those worn by the Huskies during the 1946–47 season, with the exception of the nickname and length of the shorts. These uniforms were worn in six games in the 2009–10 season and have since been used as "retro" jerseys, worn during special "Huskies Nights".

In the 2016–17 NBA season, the Raptors not only unveiled the season's "retro" uniforms in commemoration of the 70th anniversary of the Toronto Huskies, but also revealed a Huskies-themed throwback court. The franchise also launched a special red Chinese New Year jersey in celebration of the event. The Chinese New Year jersey features a stylized rendering of "Toronto" in white traditional Chinese characters (多倫多, Pinyin: Duōlúnduō, Wade–Giles: To^{1}-lun^{2}-to^{1}) with the head of a leftward-facing (viewer's perspective) Chinese dragon replacing the upper half of the first 多 character and the Raptors slashed basketball logo replacing much of the bottom half of the 倫 character.

Other jerseys worn by the Raptors include a green uniform worn from the 2007−08 season through to the 2011−12 season on St. Patrick's Day.

The Raptors also wear a camouflage uniform based on the temperate variant of CADPAT (Canadian Disruptive Pattern) during special events involving the Canadian Armed Forces (CAF), as well as jerseys themed by Drake, such as Welcome Toronto jerseys, which are black with gold text.

Special

Huskies Night (2016–17)	Chinese New Year (2016–17)	Saint Patrick's Day (2007–12)	CAF Appr'n (2012)

Source: jerseymuseum.org

== Arenas ==
Arenas
Arena	Games played	Tenure
SkyDome	117	1995–1999
Maple Leaf Gardens	6	1995–1999
Copps Coliseum	3	1995–1999
Scotiabank Arena	710	1999–2020, 2021–present
Amalie Arena	37	2020–2021

- OVO Athletic Centre (Practice facility: 2016–present)

== Personnel ==
=== Current roster ===
Toronto Raptors roster
Players

Pos.	No.	Player	Height	Weight	DOB	From
G/F	13	Kyle Anderson	6 ft 8 in (2.03 m)	230 lb (104 kg)	1993-09-20	UCLA
G/F	4	Scottie Barnes	6 ft 8 in (2.03 m)	237 lb (108 kg)	2001-08-01	Florida State
G/F	9	RJ Barrett	6 ft 6 in (1.98 m)	214 lb (97 kg)	2000-06-14	Duke
F	77	Jamison Battle	6 ft 7 in (2.01 m)	220 lb (100 kg)	2001-05-10	Ohio State
C	12	Nate Bittle (TW)	7 ft 0 in (2.13 m)	215 lb (98 kg)	2003-06-03	Oregon
G	8	Jaden Bradley	6 ft 3 in (1.91 m)	200 lb (91 kg)	2003-09-14	Arizona
F	22	Allen Graves	6 ft 8 in (2.03 m)	225 lb (102 kg)	2006-07-28	Santa Clara
F	32	Trayce Jackson-Davis	6 ft 9 in (2.06 m)	245 lb (111 kg)	2000-02-22	Indiana
F	2	Kawhi Leonard (injured)	6 ft 7 in (2.01 m)	225 lb (102 kg)	1991-06-29	San Diego State
G	55	Alijah Martin	6 ft 2 in (1.88 m)	210 lb (95 kg)	2001-12-06	Florida
G	11	Kevin McCullar Jr. (TW)	6 ft 6 in (1.98 m)	210 lb (95 kg)	2001-03-15	Kansas
F	30	Collin Murray-Boyles	6 ft 7 in (2.01 m)	245 lb (111 kg)	2005-06-10	South Carolina
C	19	Jakob Pöltl	7 ft 0 in (2.13 m)	253 lb (115 kg)	1995-10-15	Utah
G	5	Immanuel Quickley	6 ft 3 in (1.91 m)	190 lb (86 kg)	1999-06-17	Kentucky
G	1	Jamal Shead	6 ft 1 in (1.85 m)	200 lb (91 kg)	2002-07-24	Houston
G	18	Malachi Smith (TW)	6 ft 4 in (1.93 m)	205 lb (93 kg)	1999-12-06	Gonzaga
G	14	Ja'Kobe Walter	6 ft 5 in (1.96 m)	180 lb (82 kg)	2004-09-04	Baylor

Coaches
Head coach
- Darko Rajaković
Assistant(s)
- Mery Andrade
- Michael Batiste
- Vin Bhavnani
- Pat Delany
- Eric Khoury
- Jama Mahlalela
- Jim Sann
- Ivo Simović
- James Wade

Legend
- (DP) Unsigned draft pick
- (FA) Free agent
- (S) Suspended
- (GL) On assignment to G League affiliate
- (TW) Two-way affiliate player
- Injured

Roster
Updated: November 5, 2026

=== Retained draft rights ===
The Raptors hold the draft rights to the following unsigned draft picks who have been playing outside the NBA. A drafted player, either an international draftee or a college draftee who is not signed by the team that drafted him, is allowed to sign with any non-NBA team. In this case, the team retains the player's draft rights in the NBA until one year after the player's contract with the non-NBA team ends. This list includes draft rights that were acquired from trades with other teams.

Draft	Round	Pick	Player	Pos.	Nationality	Current team	Note(s)	Ref

=== Retired numbers ===
All retired numbers hang from the rafters at Scotiabank Arena.

Toronto Raptors retired numbers
No.	Player	Position	Tenure	Date
15	Vince Carter	G/F	1998–2004	November 2, 2024

- The team announced that Kyle Lowry's No. 7 will be retired after a game against the Philadelphia 76ers on January 10, 2027.
- The NBA retired Bill Russell's No. 6 for all its member teams on August 11, 2022.

=== Basketball Hall of Famers ===
Toronto Raptors Hall of Famers
Players
No.	Name	Position	Tenure	Inducted
34	Hakeem Olajuwon	C	2001–2002	2008
1	Tracy McGrady	G/F	1997–2000	2017
4	Chris Bosh^{2}	C/F	2003–2010	2021
3	Chauncey Billups	G	1998	2024
15	Vince Carter	G/F	1998–2004	2024
Coaches
Name		Position	Tenure	Inducted
Lenny Wilkens^{1}		Head coach	2000–2003	1998
Gene Keady		Assistant coach	2005–2006	2023
Contributors
Name		Position	Tenure	Inducted
Wayne Embry		General manager	2006	1999

Notes:

- ^{1} Wilkens was inducted into the Hall of Fame thrice — as player, as coach and as a member of the 1992 Olympic team.
- ^{2} Bosh was inducted into the Hall of Fame twice — as player and as a member of the 2008 Olympic team.

=== FIBA Hall of Famers ===
Toronto Raptors Hall of Famers
Players
No.	Name	Position	Tenure	Inducted
34	Hakeem Olajuwon	C	2001–2002	2016
16	Peja Stojaković	F	2010–2011	2024
26	Hedo Türkoğlu	F	2009–2010	2026

== Management ==
General managers

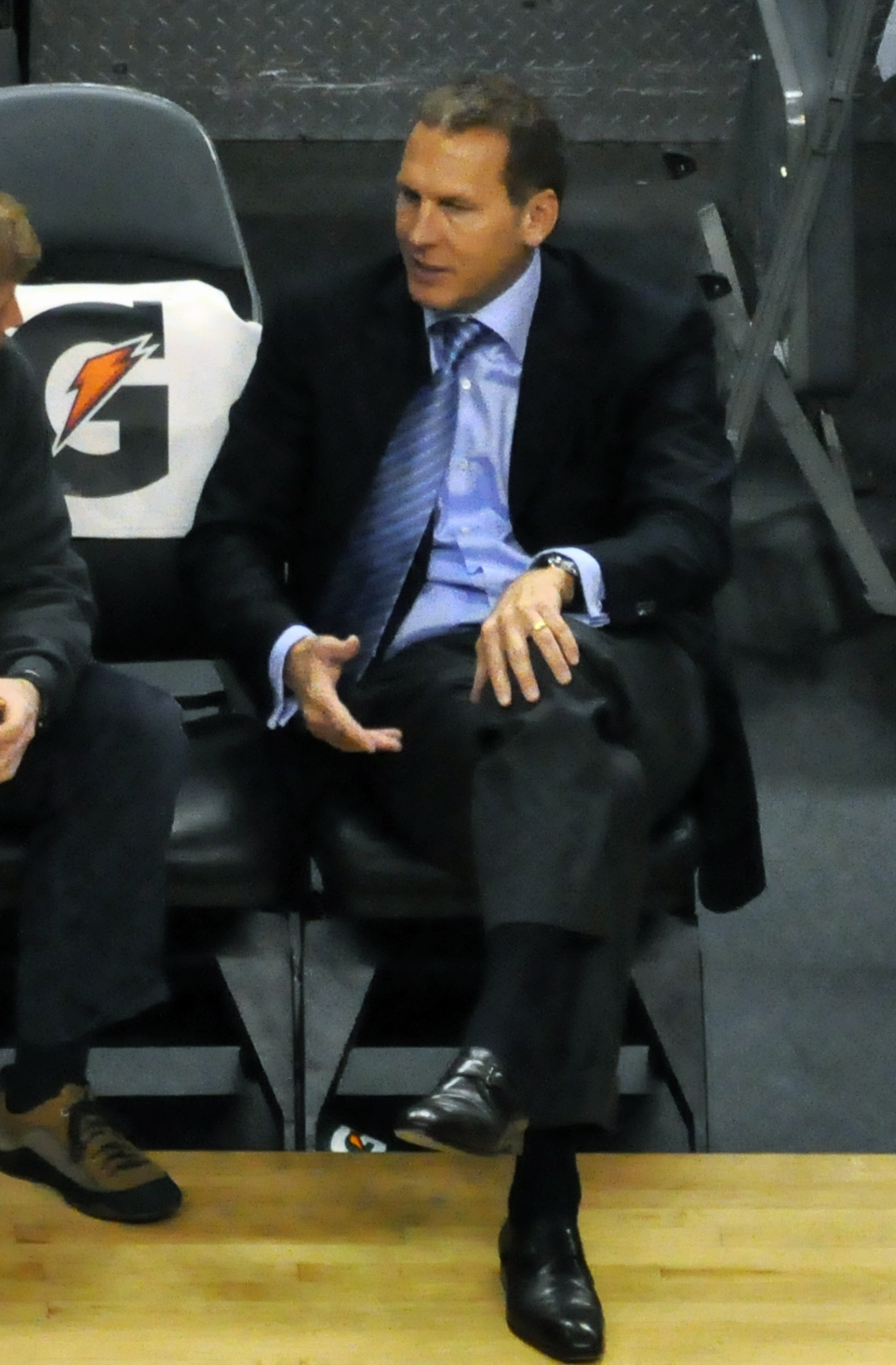
Bryan Colangelo (right) at a Raptors game in 2009. He was the team's general manager, and president of basketball operations from February 2006 to May 2013.

GM history
Name	Tenure
Isiah Thomas	1995–March 1998
Glen Grunwald	March 1998–April 2004
Jack McCloskey	April 2004–June 2004 (Interim)
Rob Babcock	June 2004–January 2006
Wayne Embry	January 2006–February 2006 (Interim)
Bryan Colangelo	February 2006–May 2013
Masai Ujiri	May 2013–September 2016
Jeff Weltman	September 2016–May 2017
Bobby Webster	June 2017–present

Presidents of basketball operations

Presidents of basketball operations history
President	Tenure
Richard Peddie	1999–February 2006
Bryan Colangelo	February 2006–May 2013
Masai Ujiri	May 2013–June 2025

Owners

Ownership history
Owner	Tenure
John Bitove, Allan Slaight, Isiah Thomas	1995–1998
Maple Leaf Sports & Entertainment	1998–present

== Awards and records ==
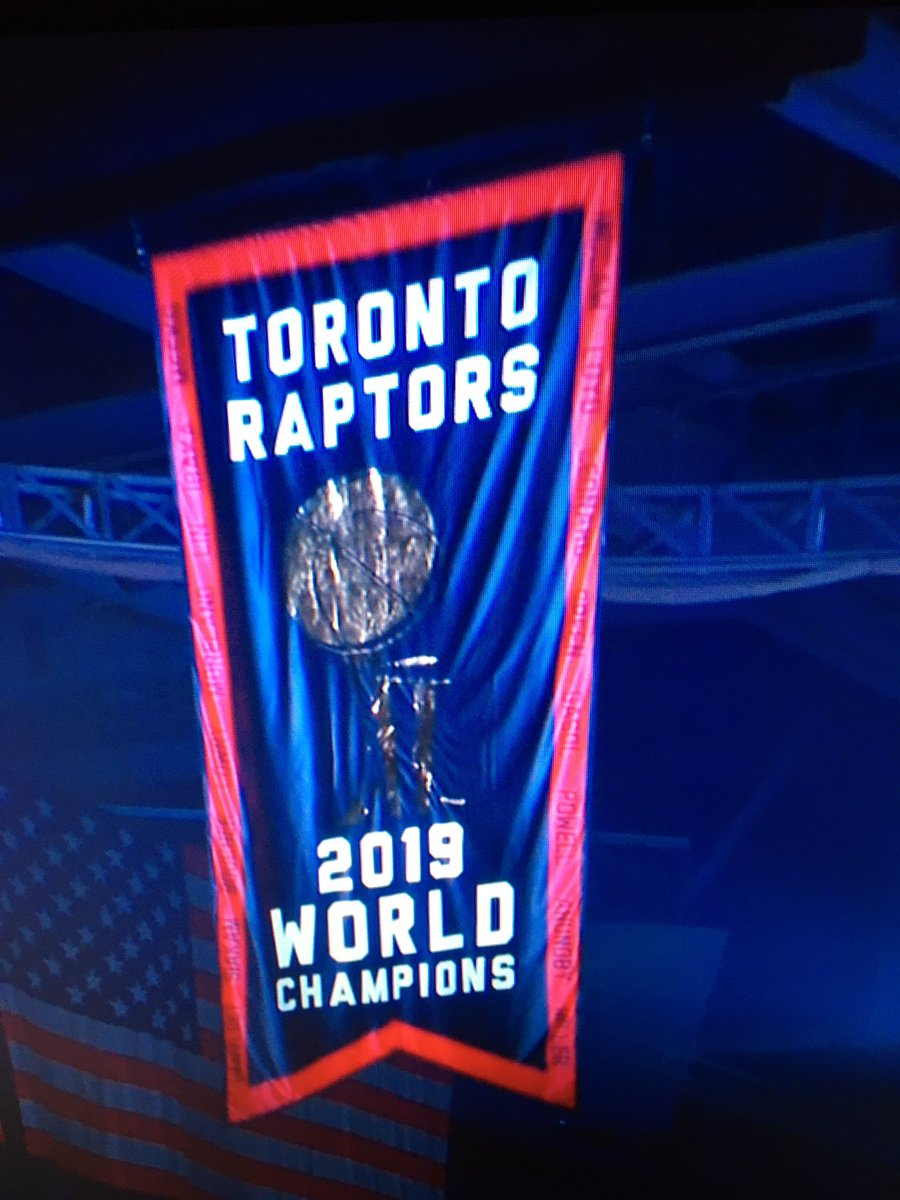
Championship banner for the 2019 NBA Finals, depicting the Larry O'Brien Championship Trophy

Since their inception in 1995, the Raptors have made the playoffs thirteen times (2000–2002, 2007, 2008, 2014–2020 and 2022), advancing past the first round six times (2001 and 2016–2020). The Raptors have won the Atlantic Division seven times (2007, 2014–2016, and 2018–2020), and the franchise record number of wins in the regular season is 59 (2018). The Raptors advanced to the Eastern Conference Finals twice (2016 and 2019). Only once did the Raptors reach and win the NBA Finals (2019). Nine Raptors have been selected to play in the All-Star game: Vince Carter, Antonio Davis, Chris Bosh, DeMar DeRozan, Kyle Lowry, Kawhi Leonard, Pascal Siakam, Fred VanVleet and Scottie Barnes. With the exception of Davis, VanVleet and Barnes, these players also made All-NBA teams, while Leonard has also made the All-NBA Defensive team. Two Raptors coaches have also made the All-Star game: Dwane Casey in 2018 and Nick Nurse in 2020. In 2020, the Raptors went on a 15-game winning streak and set a new record for the longest winning streak by a Canadian-based professional sports franchise.

== Broadcasters ==
Raptors games are primarily broadcast on television by Canadian sports channels TSN and Sportsnet, owned by Bell Media and Rogers Communications, respectively. Through MLSE, the Raptors also operate the Canadian version of NBA TV (formerly known as Raptors NBA TV), which airs reruns of Raptors telecasts along with other news and analysis programs focusing on the team and the rest of the NBA. During the 2019 NBA Finals, for simultaneous substitution purposes, Citytv (for games aired by Sportsnet) and CTV 2 (for games aired by TSN) aired the ABC feed.

=== Television ===
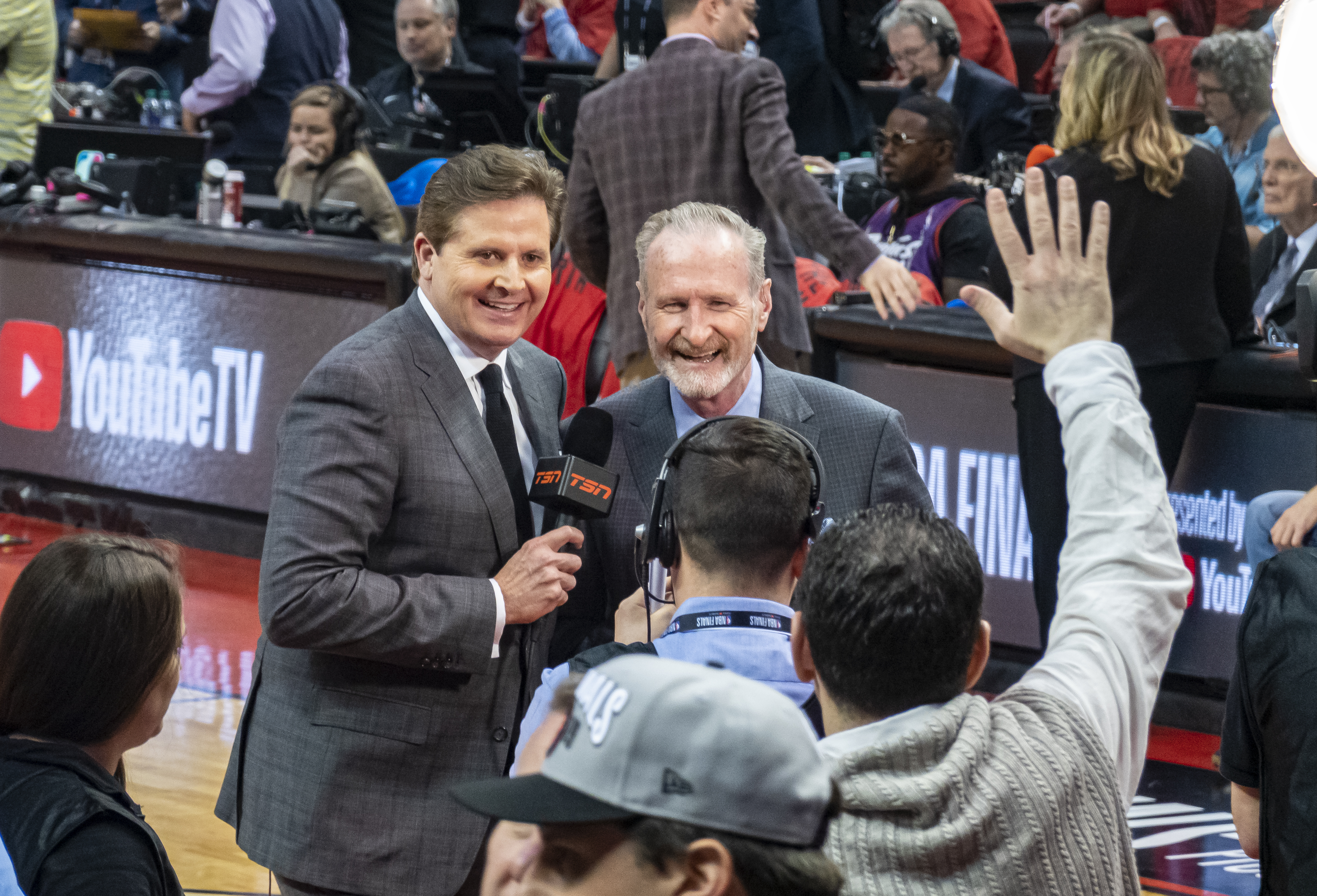
Matt Devlin and Jack Armstrong covering Game 2 of the 2019 NBA Finals

- John Saunders (Play-by-play, 1995–98, Citytv, The New VR; 1998–2001 Sportsnet)
- Dan Shulman (Play-by-play, 1995–2001, TSN)
- Rod Black (Play-by-play, 1995–2005, CTV, and TSN, 2014–2021)
- Chuck Swirsky (Play-by-play, 2001–2008, Sportsnet, and TSN)
- Jack Armstrong (Colour, 1998–present, TSN)
- Leo Rautins (Colour, 1995–present, Sportsnet; 2007–2010 CBC)
- Matt Devlin (Play-by-play, 2008–present, TSN, Sportsnet; 2007–2010, CBC)
- Sherman Hamilton (Colour, 2008–present, NBA TV Canada)

=== Radio ===
- Mike Inglis (Play-by-play, 1995–1998, CFRB 1010)
- Earl Cureton (Colour, 1997–1998, CFRB 1010)
- Chuck Swirsky (Play-by-play, 1998–2001, Fan 590; TV simulcast of play-by-play, 2001–2004)
- Jack Armstrong (Colour, 1998–2001, Fan 590; 2013–present, TSN Radio 1050)
- Leo Rautins (TV simulcast of colour, 2001–2004, Fan 590)
- Paul Romanuk (Play-by-play, 2004–2005, Fan 590)
- Paul Jones (Colour, 1995–1997, CFRB 1010; 2004–2005, 2015–present, Fan 590; Play-by-play, 2005–2015, Fan 590; 2013–present, TSN Radio 1050)
- Eric Smith (Colour, 2005–2015, Fan 590; Play-by-play, 2015–present, Fan 590)
- Matt Devlin (TV simulcast of play-by-play, 2013–present, TSN Radio 1050)
- Sherman Hamilton (Colour, 2013–present, TSN Radio 1050)

== Fanbase and marketing ==
The Raptors have enjoyed a consistent fanbase throughout their history. They set NBA attendance records in their 2000, 2001, and 2002 seasons when they made the playoffs. Attendance dipped slightly between 2003 and 2006. This improved during the 2006–07 regular season to an average of 18,258 fans (13th in the league), 92.2 per cent of capacity at the Air Canada Centre. Following the success of the 2006–07 season, Toronto became one of the league leaders in season ticket sales for the 2007–08 season.

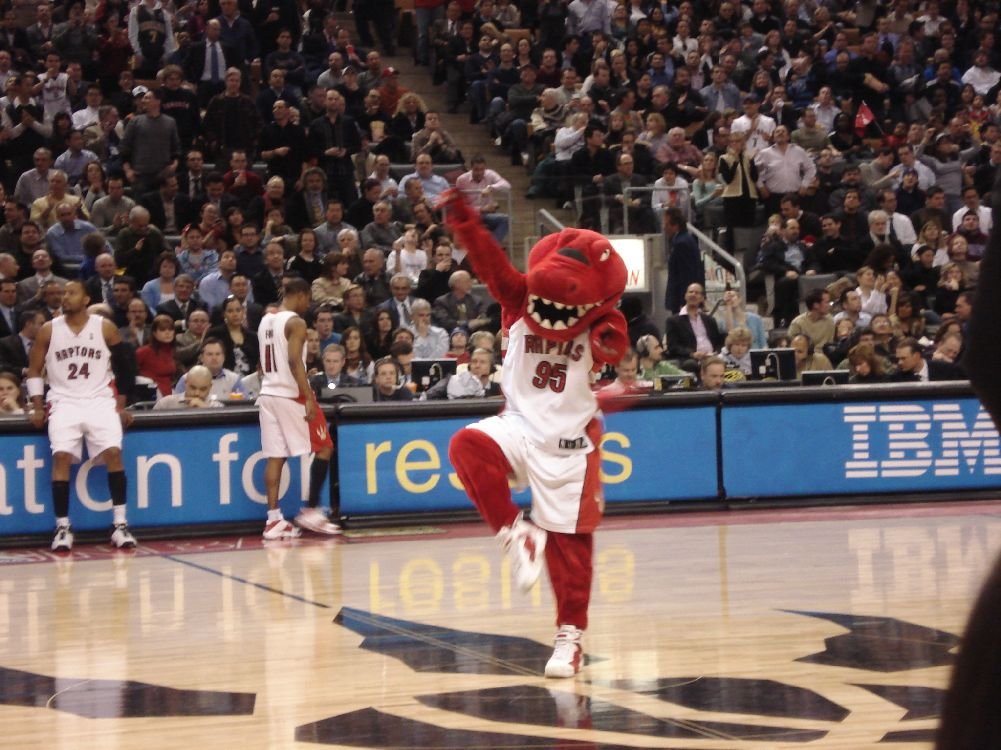
The Raptor mascot, a red featherless Velociraptor donning basketball shoes and a jersey numbered 95, after the last two digits of the year of the Raptors' establishment, rallying the crowd during a game.

Another successful run starting in 2013–14 led to a spike in the Raptors' support. For the 2014–15 season, the team sold out the 12,500 season tickets, the first time it occurred since 2011. Public watchings of the Raptors games, particularly during the playoffs, started being held in 2014 at Maple Leaf Square, which the fans nicknamed "Jurassic Park". MLSE decided to endorse this practice by setting up concession stands and branded sponsorships at the square with naming rights sold to Ford Motor Company's Canadian operations, along with increased security. At times, footage from the square is broadcast to the Raptors locker room. The victorious Game 7 against the Indiana Pacers on the 2016 playoffs was the most-watched Raptors broadcast ever and the biggest television audience in Canada that day, averaging 1.53 million viewers with a peak of 2.63 million. This record has since been broken during the Raptors' victorious 2019 playoff run, averaging 7.7 million viewers with a peak of 10 million in the NBA Finals.

The value of the Raptors franchise has risen over the years. In 1998, the franchise was bought for US$125 million. With the continued popularity of the Raptors, the value of the franchise doubled from US$148 million in 2000 to $297 million in 2004. The value of the franchise grew again from $315 million in 2006 to $373 million in 2007, and $400 million in 2008. By 2018, Forbes estimated the Raptors were worth $1.4 billion, 12th in the NBA.

The Raptor mascot, the North Side Crew, and DJ 4 Korners provide in-arena entertainment at Scotiabank Arena during game day. During the 2013–14 season, a new "Drake Zone" was created in the lower bowl. Limited edition shirts were given away to fans sitting in the Drake Zone. Giveaways are sometimes bundled with tickets to encourage attendance. Further, whenever Toronto scores more than 100 points in a home game and wins, fans can redeem their ticket for a cheese or pepperoni pizza slice at standalone Pizza Pizza locations throughout Ontario for the business day after the game that was played. This is part of a promotion made by the Raptors' official pizza sponsor. However, beginning in the 2018–19 season, the promotion added an extra requirement of purchasing a first slice before receiving the free second slice, though it requires using the Pizza Pizza mobile app instead of using a Raptors ticket, allowing Raptors fans who did not attend the game to receive a free second slice after purchasing a first slice. Beginning in the same NBA season, McDonald's Canadian operations also offer fans in Ontario using the McDonald's Canada mobile app, regardless of game attendance, a free medium-sized serving of French fries with a minimum C$1 purchase of another item the next day after when the Raptors make at least a dozen successful three-pointers in home or away games regardless of outcome. The promotion was then expanded to include McDonald's locations throughout the rest of Canada the following season, but excluded McDonald's restaurants located in Quebec because the chain was already running a similar promotion with the Montreal Canadiens NHL team in that province.

=== Partnership with Drake ===
==== "We The North" re-branding ====
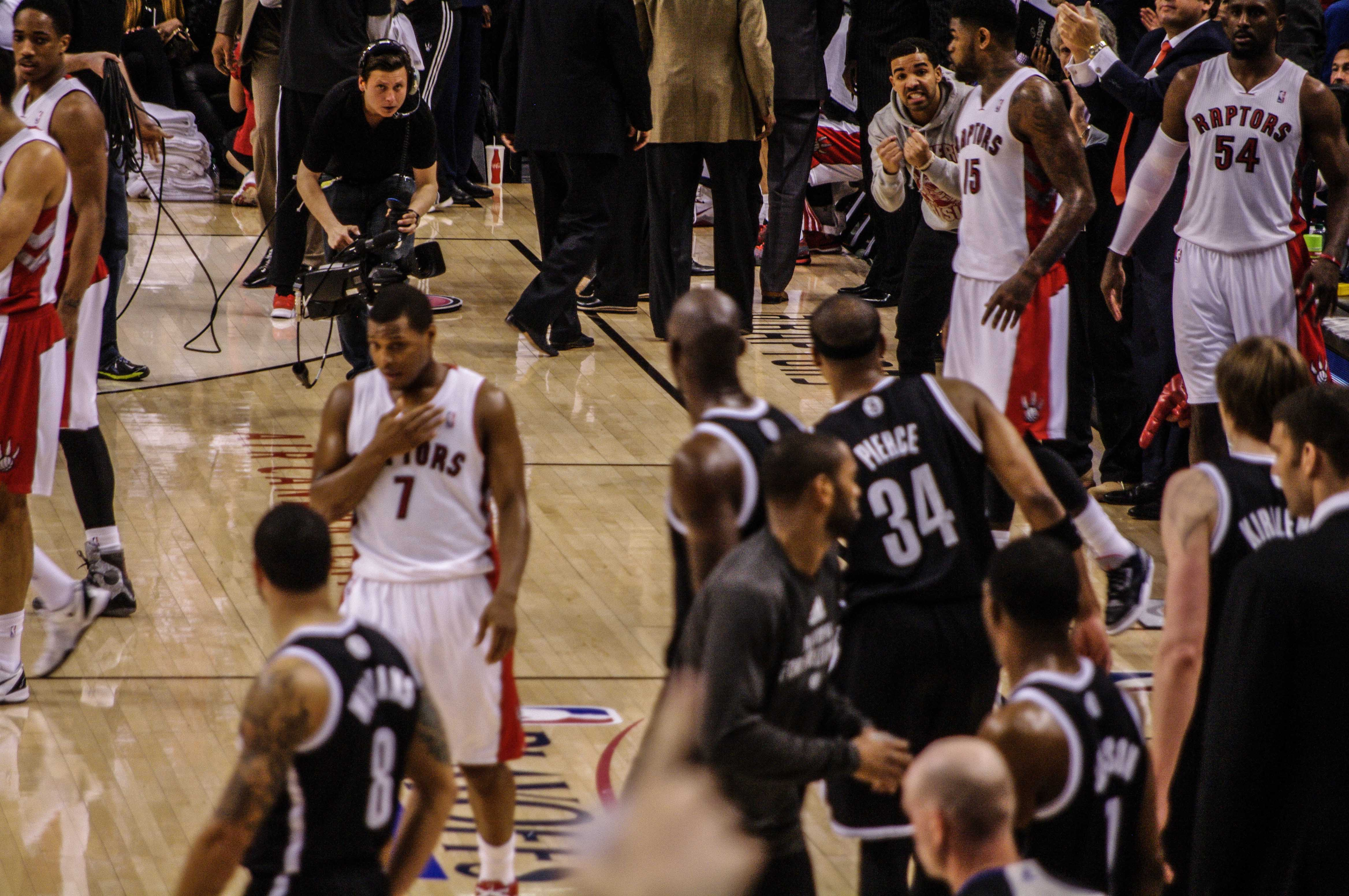
Toronto-based hip-hop musician Drake stands courtside during the first round of the 2014 playoffs. Drake was named the "global ambassador" for the Raptors in September 2013.

In the lead-up to the team's 20th anniversary season in 2015 and its hosting of the 2016 All-Star Game, the Raptors began the process of re-branding itself. On September 30, 2013, Toronto-based rapper Drake was announced as the new "global ambassador" for the Toronto Raptors, thereby joining the executive committee of his hometown's NBA team. In April 2014, the Raptors unveiled a new imaging campaign developed by the agency Sid Lee, "We The North", built around a manifesto that was meant to embrace the team's trait of being an "outsider" from the "north side", and the accompanying feelings of players and fans.

The "We The North" campaign was originally to be launched during the 2015–16 season; however, the launch was hastened so it would be ready in time for the 2014 playoffs, taking into account the poor performance of Canada's other pro sports teams at the time. An introductory commercial was quickly filmed, which featured the manifesto as narration, scenes of local basketball players in various outdoor locations around the city, and ended with a scene displaying a black, waving flag with the motto written on it. The campaign was immediately embraced by fans during the playoffs and following season; the launch commercial was viewed over 500,000 times in the two days following its release, "We The North"-branded shirts and flags became a common sight at games, while Ryerson University (now Toronto Metropolitan University) sports marketing professor Cheri Bradish compared the campaign to Molson's former "I Am Canadian" alcohol advertising campaign in how it resonated with the country.

On December 19, 2014, the Raptors soft-launched a new logo also designed by Sid Lee, which features a basketball with claw marks. The new logo was officially implemented during the 2015–16 season. The logo's introduction was marred by a disorganized launch, which saw a black and white version initially shown before the eventual unveiling of coloured versions later in the day, mixed reviews for the design itself, with some (especially on the black and white version) comparing it to that of the Brooklyn Nets, and despite teasing merchandise with the new logo, not releasing any until at least mid-2015. There were also alleged tensions between MLSE staff and Drake surrounding the new design—in particular, the performer had pushed for the team to change its primary colour from red to gold (a colour seen in one of the official variants of the logo unveiled that day). In a response on Twitter, Drake distanced himself from the "execution" of the new logo.

==== Welcome Toronto ====
In 2018, Drake unveiled the Welcome Toronto program with the Raptors. As a part of the program, the Raptors wore "city edition" uniforms for six home games throughout the 2017–18 season. As a salute to the earlier We the North campaign, the uniforms feature a gold chevron with "NORTH" written across it. The six Welcome Toronto home games also featured an OVO-themed black-and-gold home court, with chevrons pointing north. In addition to the Welcome Toronto home games, it was also announced that the Raptors and OVO would donate $1 million in order to refurbish local community basketball courts, as well as another $2 million to Canada Basketball.

==== 2025 commentating ban ====
In January 2025, Drake was banned from commentating on Toronto Raptors game broadcasts for one year for disparaging former Raptors player DeMar DeRozan.

=== Community service ===
The Raptors Foundation was the charitable arm of the Raptors, dedicated to assisting Ontario's registered charities that support programs and sports initiatives for at-risk children and youth. The Foundation strove to lift spirits and change lives for young people by supporting local and provincial organizations that provide recreational, educational and other youth-oriented activities. Through its community ties and with the help of its corporate partners, donors, Raptors players and volunteers, the Foundation had successfully raised more than $14 million between 1995 and 2007, and reached out to thousands of other charities. In 2009, the Raptors Foundation merged with the other charitable arms of MLSE's other sports franchises to form the MLSE Team Up Foundation.

In 2018, the Raptors, in partnership with Drake, announced the Welcome Toronto program. The program will see the Raptors and OVO contribute $2 million to Canada Basketball over the next four years. In addition, the Raptors and OVO also announced a donation of $1 million over the next three years in order to refurbish four community basketball courts within Toronto city limits. The four courts are located at Flemingdon Community Centre in the North York district in the north end of the city, Malvern Community Recreation Centre in the Scarborough district in the east end of the city, Matty Eckler Community Centre in the Riverdale neighbourhood of the Old Toronto district just to the east of downtown, and Thistletown Community Centre in the Etobicoke district in the west end of the city.

== Rivalries ==
The Toronto Raptors have a rivalry with both the New York Knicks and the Brooklyn Nets.

=== New Jersey/Brooklyn Nets ===
The New Jersey/Brooklyn Nets and the Raptors have been minor rivals since the trade of Vince Carter during the 2004–05 season. The rivalry began to heat up as the two teams faced each other in the opening round of the 2007 NBA Playoffs, with the Nets winning the series, 4–2, after a go-ahead shot by Richard Jefferson with 8 seconds left in Game 6 ensuring a 98–97 defeat for the Raptors. The rivalry was rekindled during the 2013–14 season when the Nets and Raptors battled for the Atlantic Division. The Raptors won the division final but then faced the Nets in the opening round of the 2014 NBA Playoffs. Before Game 1 of the series, Raptors' general manager Masai Ujiri spoke at a Raptors rally outside Air Canada Centre's Maple Leaf Square. During the rally, Ujiri yelled "Fuck Brooklyn!" which found its way onto various social media platforms within minutes. Masai was fined $25,000 by the NBA for the quote and later apologized for the excessive language. The hard-fought series lasted seven games, and was decided in the final seconds when Paul Pierce blocked Kyle Lowry's shot giving the Nets the 104–103 victory. The two teams met again in the first round of 2020 NBA Playoffs, this time with the Raptors sweeping the Nets in four games, which was the first playoff series that the Raptors swept.

=== New York Knicks ===
The New York Knicks and the Raptors are divisional rivals. The Raptors made their first-ever playoff appearance during the 1999–2000 season, in which they were swept by the Knicks in the first round, 3–0. The following season, the Raptors redeemed themselves, defeating the Knicks in the first round 3–2; this effectively ended the Knicks' run as perennial NBA championship contenders, which began in the early 1990s.

== See also ==
- Basketball in Canada
- Sports in Toronto
- Toronto Tempo of the Women's National Basketball Association (WNBA)

Preceded by Golden State Warriors	NBA champions 2018–19	Succeeded by Los Angeles Lakers
