= Eric Smith (sportscaster) =

Canadian sportscaster (born 1975)

- Born: 2 April 1975 (age 51)
- Sports commentary career
- Teams: Toronto Raptors, Toronto Blue Jays
- Genre: color commentary/sports commentator
- Sport: Basketball

Eric Smith (born 2 April 1975) is a Canadian sportscaster on Fan 590 in Toronto and Sportsnet TV. He is the radio play by play voice of the Toronto Raptors and the alternate radio play by play voice of the Toronto Blue Jays.

Smith has been working at Sportsnet and Sportsnet 590 the FAN, covering the Raptors and Blue Jays in some capacity, for more than 20 years. He has also done work for Global TV sports, as their Raptors/NBA analyst, and he has appeared on CNN, NBA TV, CBC Newsworld and more. He is the radio voice for Toronto Raptors radio broadcasts as well as a full-time sports talk radio host.

Smith also serves as the host of the pre-game, half-time, and post-game shows on the Raptors radio broadcasts. When he is not working on the radio, Smith jumps over to TV, working the sidelines and hosting the pre-game and halftime shows for the Raptors broadcasts on Sportsnet.

Since 2005, Smith has worked alongside Paul Jones during the radio broadcasts. From 2005 to 2014, Smith served as the colour commentator while Jones handled the play-by-play. From 2014 onwards, Smith moved to the play-by-play role while Jones switched to colour analyst. On June 15, 2020, Smith and Jones became co-hosts of a new afternoon sports talk show on Sportsnet 590, Smith & Jones.

In addition to those duties, Smith hosts a weekly basketball show on the Fan 590, Hoops, which used to be simulcast on NBA TV Canada. Additionally, Smith is a columnist for Sportsnet.ca.

Smith currently serves as one of the tennis play by play voices for the Rogers Cup (2015–present). He used to host Blue Jays Xpress, a Sportsnet 360 TV program that followed each Toronto Blue Jays' game. He is now the alternate play by play for the Blue Jays, filling in for Ben Shulman on Fan 590 during the latter's TV assignments.

In 2012, Smith was the TV play-by-play voice for men's boxing on the Canadian Olympic Broadcast, at the London Summer Games.
