= Paul Jones (sportscaster) =

Canadian sportscaster (born 1958)

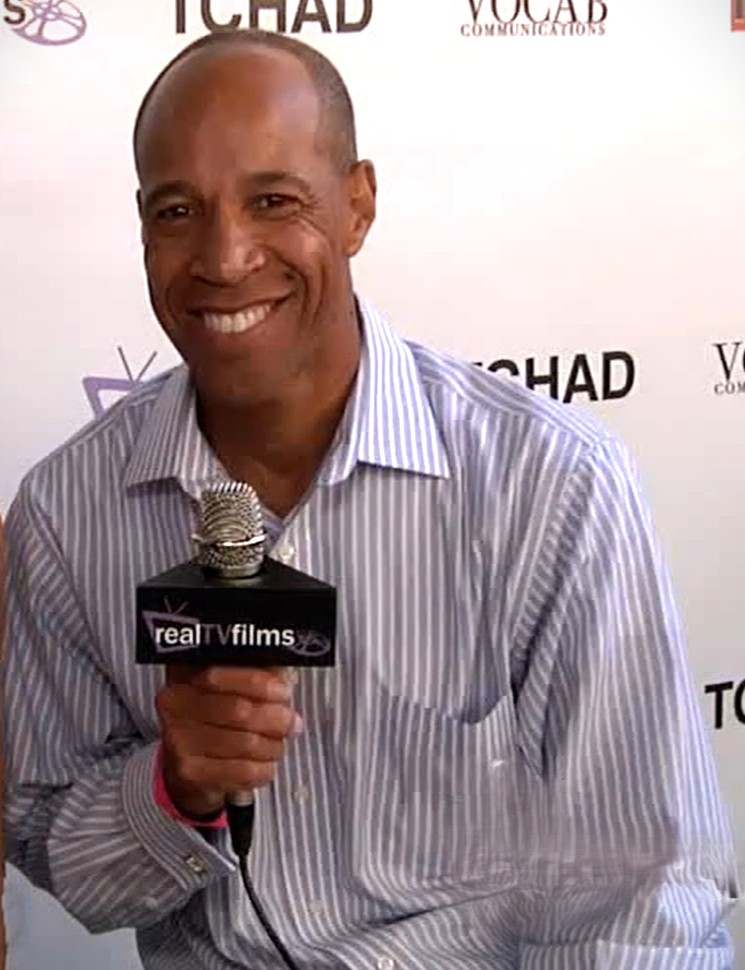
Jones in 2011

Paul Jones (born 1958) is a Canadian sportscaster. He previously served as the colour analyst on Raptors radio broadcasts, a role he had during the Raptors' inaugural season in 1995, with play-by-play man Mike Inglis on CFRB 1010. Currently, he serves as the Raptors' colour analyst on Fan 590, alongside play by play announcer Eric Smith.

In addition to those duties, Jones appears on a weekly basketball show hosted by Smith on the Fan 590, Hoops, which is simulcast on Raptors NBA TV. Jones and Smith also appeared together on another show on Raptors NBA TV, Double Dribble.

Jones has also served as studio analyst and sideline reporter for the Raptors on TSN, CTV, and Rogers Sportsnet. He can now be seen regularly throughout Canada on various programs and networks such as The Grill Room (SUN TV), Off the Record (TSN), and Full Court Press (Raptors NBA TV).

As a basketball player, Jones won three provincial titles (1978, 1980–81) as a member of York University's basketball team. He was a two-time conference All-Star, and was awarded the Kitch McPherson Trophy as Most Valuable Player of the Ontario championship game in 1981. A two-time Ontario All-Star (1980–81), he participated in the CIAU national championship tournament four times and won two bronze medals (1978–79). In 1983, he won a silver medal as a member of the team that represented Canada in the Commonwealth Basketball Tournament in New Zealand. He also coached at the high school and provincial team levels, and served as an assistant coach with the University of Western Ontario for three years.

Jones' migrated with his parents from Jamaica to Canada when he was four months old. He also worked with the Toronto District School Board for 22 years, eventually working his way up to become a school principal for Walter Scott Public School and Roselawn Public School in Richmond Hill. He left this position in 2004 to join the Raptors' radio broadcast team on the Fan 590.

Jones' younger brother is Mark Jones, a sportscaster with ESPN and ABC.

On June 15, 2020, Jones & Eric Smith became co-hosts of a new afternoon sports talk show on Sportsnet 590, Smith & Jones.
