= Louis Saia =

Canadian film director (1950–2026)

- Born: May 25, 1950
- Died: April 1, 2026 (aged 75)
- Partner: Lise Plouffe Mauffette

Louis Saia (May 25, 1950 – April 1, 2026) was a Canadian screenwriter and film director, most noted for the Les Boys franchise of hockey comedy films.

== Film career ==
Saia began his career as a theatrical director, becoming best known for the comedic show Broue, co-created with Jean-Pierre Plante, Francine Ruel, Michel Côté, Marcel Gauthier, Marc Messier, and Claude Meunier, in the early 1980s. In 1984 they received a Floyd S. Chalmers Canadian Play Award for the show's English translation, Brew. In this era he also wrote film screenplays, including the theatrical films Voyage de nuit and A Childhood Friend (Une amie d'enfance), and the television film Appelez-moi Stéphane, an adaptation of his own earlier stage play.

Beginning in 1993 he was one of the writers of the popular Quebec television sitcom La Petite Vie, alongside Meunier.

In 1995 he released his debut film as a director, The Sphinx (Le Sphinx). He followed up in 1997 with Les Boys, which became his popular breakthrough and spawned several sequel films.

After three films in the Les Boys franchise he followed up with the film Dangerous People (Les Dangereux) in 2002, but afterwards worked predominantly in television, including on the television series Radio Enfer, Histoire de filles, Max Inc. and Vice cachée.

== Death ==
Saia died in Montreal on April 1, 2026, at the age of 75. His partner of 40 years, Lise Plouffe Mauffette, died 18 days later, on April 19, at the age of 83.
