= List of most watched Canadian television broadcasts of 2011 =

The following is a list of most watched Canadian television broadcasts of 2011 (single-network only) according to BBM Canada.

== Most watched by week ==
English (national)
Week of	Title	Network	Viewers (in millions)	Ref.
January 3	2011 WJC (Semifinals; United States vs. Canada); (Gold medal game; Canada. vs. Russia)	TSN	5.13	
January 10	68th Golden Globe Awards	CTV	3.31	
January 17	The Big Bang Theory	CTV	3.19	
January 24	American Idol (Wed)	CTV	3.10	
January 31	Super Bowl XLV	CTV	6.54	
February 7	53rd Annual Grammy Awards	Global	3.26	
February 14	The Big Bang Theory	CTV	3.46	
February 21	83rd Academy Awards	CTV	6.11	
February 28	The Amazing Race	CTV	2.79	
March 7	The Big Bang Theory	CTV	3.13	
March 14	American Idol (Wed)	CTV	2.78	
March 21	American Idol (Thurs)	CTV	3.04	
March 28	The Big Bang Theory	CTV	3.22	
April 4	The Big Bang Theory	CTV	3.22	
April 11	The Amazing Race	CTV	2.60	
April 18	American Idol (Wed)	CTV	2.58	
