= Serge Thériault =

Canadian comedian and actor from Quebec (born 1948)

- Born: April 23, 1948 (age 78); Quebec City, Quebec, Canada
- Occupations: Comedian, actor
- Years active: 1970s–present
- Known for: Ding et Dong La Petite Vie (as Môman)
- Partner: Claude Meunier (comedy duo)

Serge Thériault (born April 23, 1948 in Quebec City) is a Canadian comedian and actor from Quebec. He is best known for his collaborations with Claude Meunier, including the Ding et Dong comedy duo and the spinoff television series La Petite Vie, in which he played the role of Môman.

One of his first noted roles was in the television series Jamais deux sans toi as Bernie Lacasse, one of the first gay characters ever depicted in a Quebec television series.

He also appeared in the films The Flower Between the Teeth (La fleur aux dents), The Sphinx (Le Sphinx), You Are Warm, You Are Warm (Tu brûles... tu brûles...), Voyage de nuit, Gaz Bar Blues, Les Boys, Ice Cream, Chocolate and Other Consolations (Crème glacée, chocolat et autres consolations) and August 32nd on Earth (Un 32 août sur terre), and TV series such as Les Voisins, Le Négociateur and Omertà : La loi du silence.

In recent years, Thériault has suffered from serious clinical depression, confining himself to his own home. The efforts of his friends and family to guide him toward treatment and healing were profiled in the 2021 documentary film Dehors Serge dehors.
