= Matt Devlin (sportscaster) =

American basketball announcer

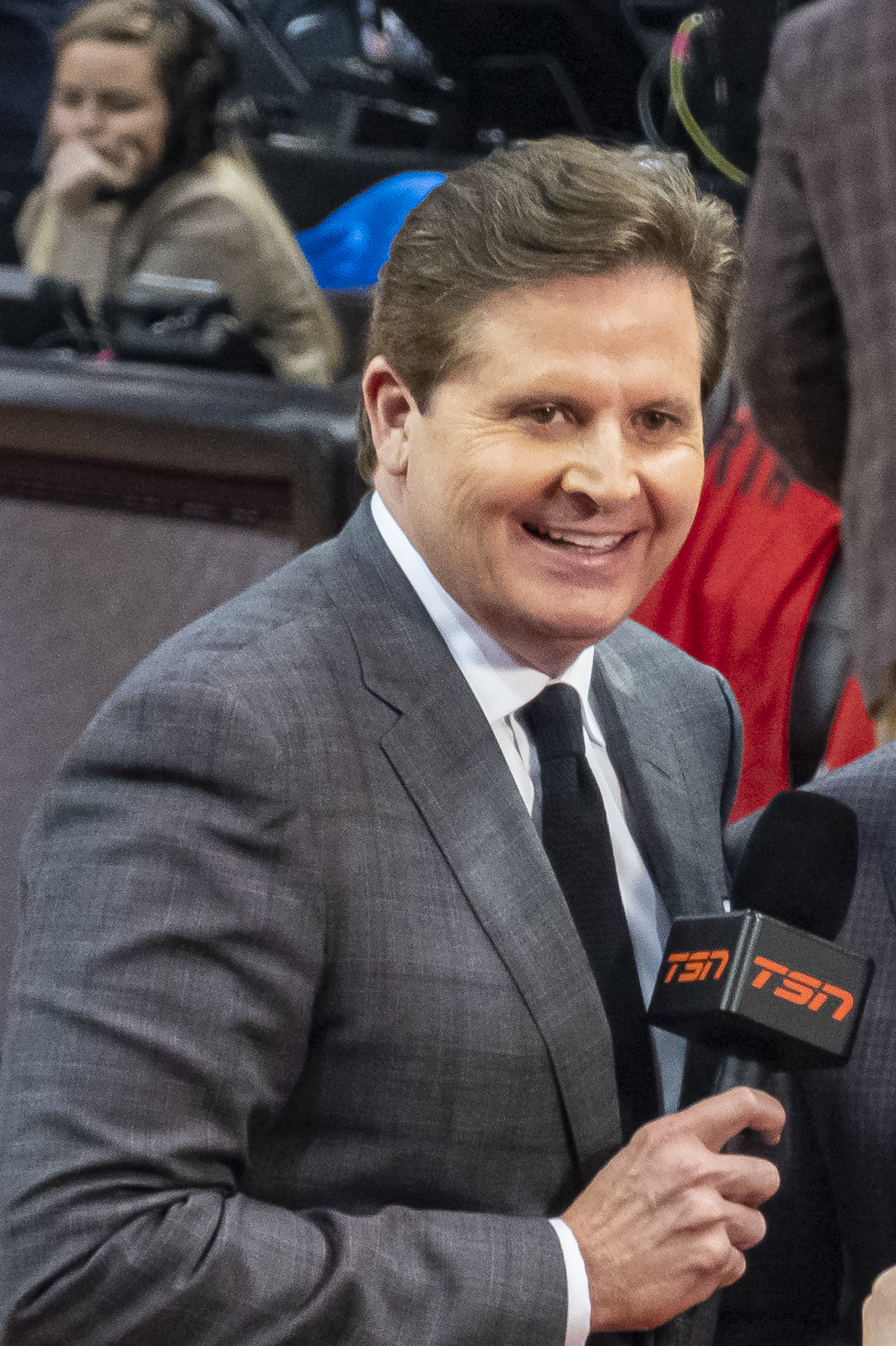
- Devlin at Game 2 of the 2019 NBA Finals
- Born: 1969 (age 56–57); Syracuse, New York, U.S.
- Citizenship: United States (1969–present); Canada (2019–present)
- Education: Boston College
- Occupation: Sportscaster
- Children: 3
- Sports commentary career
- Team: Toronto Raptors
- Genre: Play-by-play announcer
- Sport: Basketball

Matt Devlin (born 1969) is an American-Canadian play-by-play TV announcer currently employed mainly by the Toronto Raptors of the NBA, having replaced Chuck Swirsky in 2008. His current on-air colour commentator partners are Alvin Williams and Jack Armstrong.

== Broadcasting career ==
Devlin started with NBA TV during its first season in 1999. He then spent three years (2001–2004) as the lead play-by-play voice of the NBA's Memphis Grizzlies, and three years for the Charlotte Bobcats. He has also done play-by-play for the NBA on TNT and football and men's college basketball for Big Ten Network. For many years, he has provided commentary during the NBA Playoffs in the early rounds of the Western Conference. Also working for the NFL on Fox for play by play. Devlin worked 1st round NBA Playoff games with Greg Anthony and Taylor Rooks for the 1st round of the 2025 NBA Playoffs for TNT and NBA TV. Devlin served as the play-by-play man for NBC Sports' coverage of Wrestling at the 2008 Summer Olympics.

In 2008, Devlin joined the Toronto Raptors as the team's play-by-play television announcer.

Although employed by the Raptors organization, during the offseason he has occasionally served as a fill-in play-by-play announcer for both of the Raptors' broadcast partners, TSN and Sportsnet. This has included play-by-play for the CFL on TSN and for Sportsnet's coverage of the Rogers Cup (both in 2012), and for Sportsnet's Toronto Blue Jays coverage in 2013, 2014, 2016, 2017, 2022, and 2023. In addition, in the fall of 2011, during the NBA lockout, Devlin hosted the pre-game and post-game shows for Toronto Maple Leafs games on Leafs TV. (The Raptors and the Leafs are both owned by Maple Leaf Sports & Entertainment, which in turn is primarily owned by the parent companies of TSN and Sportsnet.)

Devlin is known for his catchphrase of describing 3-point shots as coming not from "downtown" but from the suburbs of Toronto, e.g. "He hits it from Mississauga!", "Drains it from Pickering!", "Banks it in from Burlington!" When Raptors fever swept across Canada during the team's run to the 2019 NBA championship, the shots started coming from the entire country: "From Edmonton!", "From Halifax!", "From Iqaluit!"

== Personal life ==
A native of Syracuse, New York, Devlin graduated from Boston College with a communication major in 1990. He has three sons, Jack, Ian and Luke, with his wife Erin. Jack Devlin, who has special needs, served as a student manager for the Iowa Hawkeyes men's basketball team from 2018 to 2022. He gained national attention when draining a shot from half-court in his final game at Carver-Hawkeye Arena. Luke is a collegiate ice hockey player at Cornell and was drafted by the Pittsburgh Penguins in the sixth round of the 2022 NHL Draft.

In 2019, Devlin became a Canadian citizen during the Raptors' NBA Finals run.
