= 2019 NBA Finals =

2019 basketball championship series

Team	Coach	Wins
Toronto Raptors	Nick Nurse	4
Golden State Warriors	Steve Kerr	2
- Dates: May 30 – June 13
- MVP: Kawhi Leonard (Toronto Raptors)
- Eastern finals: Raptors defeated Bucks, 4–2
- Western finals: Warriors defeated Trail Blazers, 4–0

The 2019 NBA Finals was the championship series of the National Basketball Association's (NBA) 2018–19 season and conclusion of the season's playoffs. In the best-of-seven playoff series, the Eastern Conference champion Toronto Raptors defeated the two-time defending NBA champion and Western Conference champion Golden State Warriors in six games to win their first NBA championship. The Raptors' victory made the team the first NBA team based outside the United States to win an NBA championship. Raptors forward Kawhi Leonard was named the NBA Finals Most Valuable Player (MVP) for the second time in his career. This was the first NBA Finals appearance for the Raptors and the first NBA Finals with games played outside of the United States.

The Warriors were favored heading into the Finals, but the Raptors had home-court advantage due to their better regular-season record. This was the first Finals since 2010 not to feature LeBron James, who had played in the past eight consecutive Finals.

The Raptors opened the series with a dominant Game One victory. After the Warriors tied the series in Game Two, the Raptors won the next two games on the road. Back in Toronto, Warriors star Kevin Durant returned from an injury-related absence, but tore his Achilles tendon. Nonetheless, the Warriors won Game Five on the road, sending the series to a Game Six in the Oracle Arena. Game Six was marred by an ACL tear suffered by star Warriors guard Klay Thompson. The Raptors won Game Six, 114–110, to win their first NBA championship.

As of 2026, this remains the most recent championship in the four major North American sports leagues won by a Canadian team.

== Background ==
=== Golden State Warriors ===
During the off-season, Golden State acquired DeMarcus Cousins, who was recovering from a ruptured left Achilles. He gave the Warriors a true, top-flight center for the first time under head coach Steve Kerr. During an overtime loss to the Los Angeles Clippers in November 2018, Draymond Green cursed out teammate Kevin Durant over his upcoming free agency status after the season, and he was suspended for the much-publicized blowup. In January 2019, Cousins returned, and the Warriors became the first team in 42 years with a starting lineup of five NBA All-Stars from the previous season. The team finished the regular season with a 57–25 record, winning the Pacific Division and securing the 1st seed in the Western Conference.

In the playoffs, Golden State defeated the Clippers in six games in the first round, despite blowing leads at home in Games 2 and 5. Cousins tore his left quadriceps in Game 2, and was initially thought to be out for the remainder of the postseason. With an increased urgency and in a sign of respect towards their opponent, Kerr opened the following round against the Houston Rockets by moving Andre Iguodala from the bench and starting the Hamptons Five for the first time in the season. With the Splash Brothers—Warriors guards Stephen Curry and Klay Thompson—struggling with their shooting, Durant had been the team's best player in the playoffs, averaging a team-leading 35.4 points entering Game 5. However, Durant left the game late in the third quarter after suffering a strained right calf; he was later ruled out indefinitely. Led by Curry and Thompson, Golden State pulled out Game 5 without Durant, and won the series in six games thanks to Stephen Curry's 33-point second half. In the Western Conference finals, Golden State swept the Portland Trail Blazers 4–0, with three of the wins including comebacks of 15 points or more. After starting nine consecutive games, Iguodala missed the deciding Game 4 with a sore left calf injury from Game 3. Curry averaged a series career-high 36.5 points, the highest average by a player in a four-game sweep in NBA history. This was Golden State's fifth consecutive trip to the NBA Finals, and they were aiming to be the first since the Shaq and Kobe-led Los Angeles Lakers to win 3-peat titles. After losing the Finals to the Raptors, they became the second team not to earn a 3-peat, joining the Miami Heat who lost their quest in 2014 to the San Antonio Spurs, who ended their own seven-year title drought. They were the second team in NBA history to achieve the feat of appearing in at least five consecutive Finals, joining the Boston Celtics, who played in ten straight Finals (1957–1966). (Note: The Celtics advanced 10 straight times, winning nine, including eight consecutive.)

=== Toronto Raptors ===
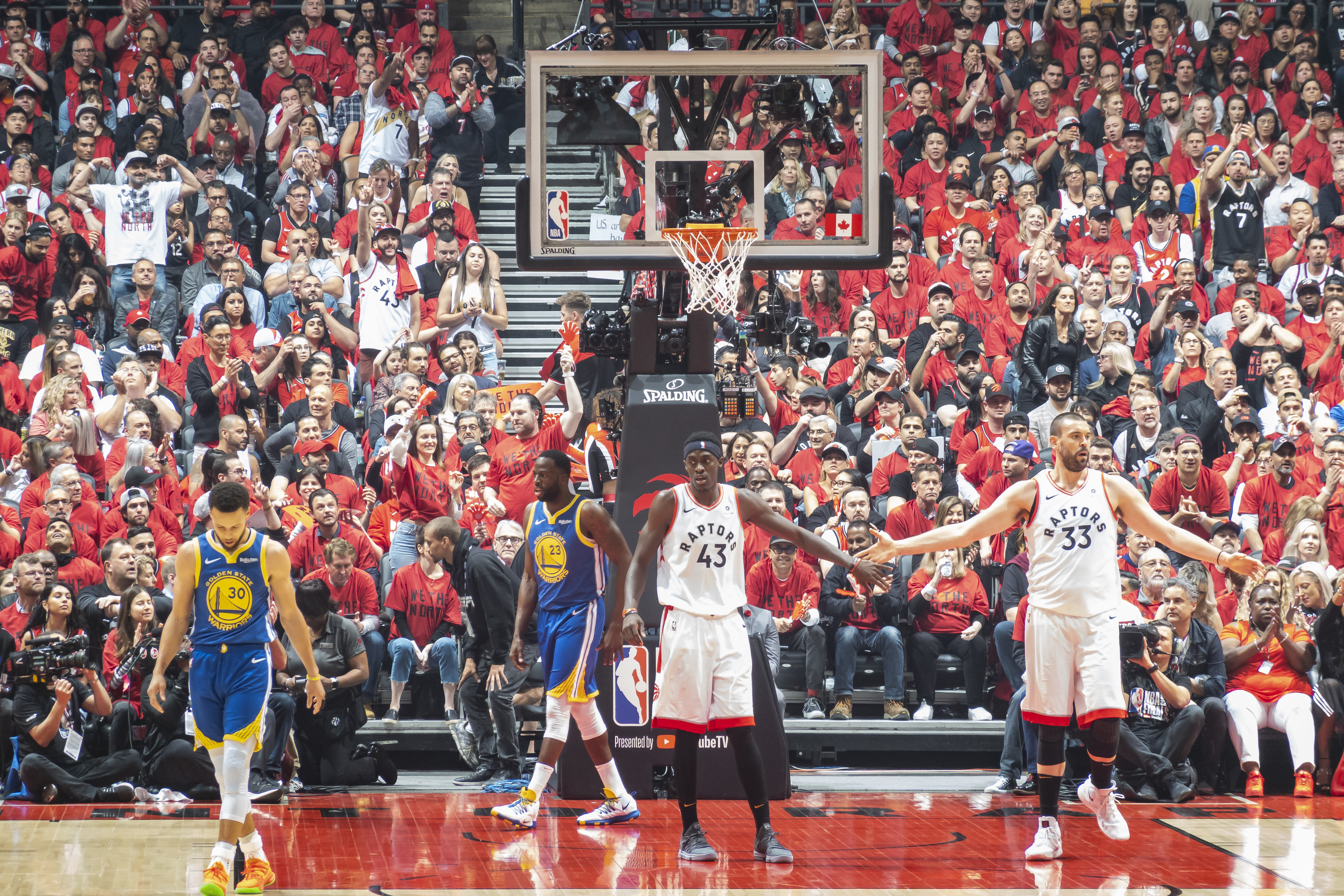
Game 2 at Scotiabank Arena in Toronto, which Golden State won

During the off-season, the Raptors fired coach Dwane Casey, who was named the 2018 NBA Coach of the Year weeks later, and replaced him with assistant coach Nick Nurse. They also traded DeMar DeRozan and Jakob Pöltl to the San Antonio Spurs in exchange for Kawhi Leonard and Danny Green. The move stunned the All-Star DeRozan, who had become a fan favorite in his nine seasons in Toronto. It was a risky move for the Raptors and their president, Masai Ujiri, as Leonard was one year away from becoming a free agent, and he wanted to leave the Spurs after playing in just nine games in 2017–18 due to tendinopathy in his left quadriceps, however the 2014 NBA Finals MVP made it through the season healthy while being systematically rested for 22 games. During the season, Toronto also traded a package that included Jonas Valančiūnas to the Memphis Grizzlies in exchange for one of the league's elite post-defenders, Marc Gasol.

The Raptors lost Game 1 of the first round to the Orlando Magic, but then won the next four games in a row to win the series in five games. After trailing 2–1 against the Philadelphia 76ers in the Eastern Conference semifinals, they defeated them in seven games, with Leonard hitting the game-winner at the buzzer as the ball bounced four times on the rim before falling in, the first buzzer beater in a Game 7 in NBA playoff history. Toronto advanced to the Eastern Conference finals to face the Milwaukee Bucks. Despite trailing 2–0, the Raptors won the next four games to advance to the Finals in six games, as Leonard outplayed the Bucks' Giannis Antetokounmpo, who won league MVP that season. This was their first trip to the NBA Finals in franchise history, breaking a 25-year drought for Toronto-based teams appearing in the championship round of any of the four major North American professional sports leagues since Major League Baseball's Toronto Blue Jays won the 1993 World Series.

=== Road to the Finals ===
Toronto Raptors (Eastern Conference champion)		Golden State Warriors (Western Conference champion)
Eastern Conference: # / Team / W / L / PCT / GB / GP; 1 / z – Milwaukee Bucks * / 60 / 22 / .732 / – / 82; 2 / y – Toronto Raptors * / 58 / 24 / .707 / 2.0 / 82; 3 / x – Philadelphia 76ers / 51 / 31 / .622 / 9.0 / 82; 4 / x – Boston Celtics / 49 / 33 / .598 / 11.0 / 82; 5 / x – Indiana Pacers / 48 / 34 / .585 / 12.0 / 82; 6 / x – Brooklyn Nets / 42 / 40 / .512 / 18.0 / 82; 7 / y – Orlando Magic * / 42 / 40 / .512 / 18.0 / 82; 8 / x – Detroit Pistons / 41 / 41 / .500 / 19.0 / 82; 9 / Charlotte Hornets / 39 / 43 / .476 / 21.0 / 82; 10 / Miami Heat / 39 / 43 / .476 / 21.0 / 82; 11 / Washington Wizards / 32 / 50 / .390 / 28.0 / 82; 12 / Atlanta Hawks / 29 / 53 / .354 / 31.0 / 82; 13 / Chicago Bulls / 22 / 60 / .268 / 38.0 / 82; 14 / Cleveland Cavaliers / 19 / 63 / .232 / 41.0 / 82; 15 / New York Knicks / 17 / 65 / .207 / 43.0 / 82; 2nd seed in the East, 2nd best league record	Regular season	Western Conference: # / Team / W / L / PCT / GB / GP; 1 / c – Golden State Warriors * / 57 / 25 / .695 / – / 82; 2 / y – Denver Nuggets * / 54 / 28 / .659 / 3.0 / 82; 3 / x – Portland Trail Blazers / 53 / 29 / .646 / 4.0 / 82; 4 / y – Houston Rockets * / 53 / 29 / .646 / 4.0 / 82; 5 / x – Utah Jazz / 50 / 32 / .610 / 7.0 / 82; 6 / x – Oklahoma City Thunder / 49 / 33 / .598 / 8.0 / 82; 7 / x – San Antonio Spurs / 48 / 34 / .585 / 9.0 / 82; 8 / x – Los Angeles Clippers / 48 / 34 / .585 / 9.0 / 82; 9 / Sacramento Kings / 39 / 43 / .476 / 18.0 / 82; 10 / Los Angeles Lakers / 37 / 45 / .451 / 20.0 / 82; 11 / Minnesota Timberwolves / 36 / 46 / .439 / 21.0 / 82; 12 / Memphis Grizzlies / 33 / 49 / .402 / 24.0 / 82; 13 / New Orleans Pelicans / 33 / 49 / .402 / 24.0 / 82; 14 / Dallas Mavericks / 33 / 49 / .402 / 24.0 / 82; 15 / Phoenix Suns / 19 / 63 / .232 / 38.0 / 82; 1st seed in the West, 3rd best league record
Defeated the 7th seeded Orlando Magic, 4–1	First round	Defeated the 8th seeded Los Angeles Clippers, 4–2
Defeated the 3rd seeded Philadelphia 76ers, 4–3	Conference semifinals	Defeated the 4th seeded Houston Rockets, 4–2
Defeated the 1st seeded Milwaukee Bucks, 4–2	Conference finals	Defeated the 3rd seeded Portland Trail Blazers, 4–0

=== Regular season series ===
The Raptors won the regular season series 2–0.

November 29, 2018

Recap

Golden State Warriors 128, Toronto Raptors 131 (OT)

Scotiabank Arena, Toronto, Ontario

December 12, 2018

Recap

Toronto Raptors 113, Golden State Warriors 93

Oracle Arena, Oakland, California

== Series summary ==
Winning team in bold.

Game	Date	Road team	Result	Home team
Game 1	May 30	Golden State Warriors	109–118 (0–1)	**Toronto Raptors**
Game 2	June 2	**Golden State Warriors**	109–104 (1–1)	Toronto Raptors
Game 3	June 5	**Toronto Raptors**	123–109 (2–1)	Golden State Warriors
Game 4	June 7	**Toronto Raptors**	105–92 (3–1)	Golden State Warriors
Game 5	June 10	**Golden State Warriors**	106–105 (2–3)	Toronto Raptors
Game 6	June 13	**Toronto Raptors**	114–110 (4–2)	Golden State Warriors

== Game summaries ==
=== Game 1 ===
SN, RDS, ABC

May 30
9:00 pm

Box score

Golden State Warriors 109, **Toronto Raptors** **118**
Scoring by quarter: 21–**25**, 28–**34**, **32**–29, 28–**30**
Pts: Stephen Curry 34; Rebs: Draymond Green 10; Asts: Draymond Green 10	Pts: Pascal Siakam 32; Rebs: Leonard, Siakam 8 each Asts: Kyle Lowry 9
**Toronto lead series, 1–0**

Scotiabank Arena, Toronto, Ontario
Attendance: 19,983
Referees:
- No. 19 James Capers
- No. 23 Jason Phillips
- No. 30 John Goble

Pascal Siakam scored a playoff career-high 32 points on 14-of-17 shooting to lead Toronto to a 118–109 win over Golden State in the first-ever NBA Finals game played outside the United States. The Raptors had a 10-point lead at the half. Siakam, the NBA Most Improved Player that season, shot 6-for-6 in the third quarter to keep the Warriors at bay. Toronto maintained a double-digit lead for most of the fourth quarter, countering every rally by Golden State.

Leonard had 23 points, eight rebounds and five assists in his first NBA Finals game since he was named the Finals MVP in 2014. Gasol added 20 for the Raptors. Curry scored 34 and Thompson had 21 for Golden State, which had won Game 1 of the Finals in each of the last four years. Draymond Green had a triple-double with 10 points, 10 rebounds, and 10 assists. Cousins returned from a quadriceps injury to come off the bench in his first NBA Finals game. After missing Game 4 of the Western Conference finals with a left calf injury, Iguodala left near the end of this game after limping and favoring his right leg. Durant, the MVP of the last two NBA Finals, traveled with the team to Toronto, but remained sidelined. This was the only game in the entire series with the home team victorious.

=== Game 2 ===
TSN/CTV 2, RDS, ABC

June 2
8:00 pm

Box score

**Golden State Warriors** **109**, Toronto Raptors 104
Scoring by quarter: 26–**27**, 28–**32**, **34**–21, 21–**24**
Pts: Klay Thompson 25; Rebs: Cousins, Green 10 each Asts: Draymond Green 9	Pts: Kawhi Leonard 34; Rebs: Kawhi Leonard 14; Asts: Pascal Siakam 4
**Series tied, 1–1**

Scotiabank Arena, Toronto, Ontario
Attendance: 20,014
Referees:
- No. 48 Scott Foster
- No. 25 Tony Brothers
- No. 14 Ed Malloy

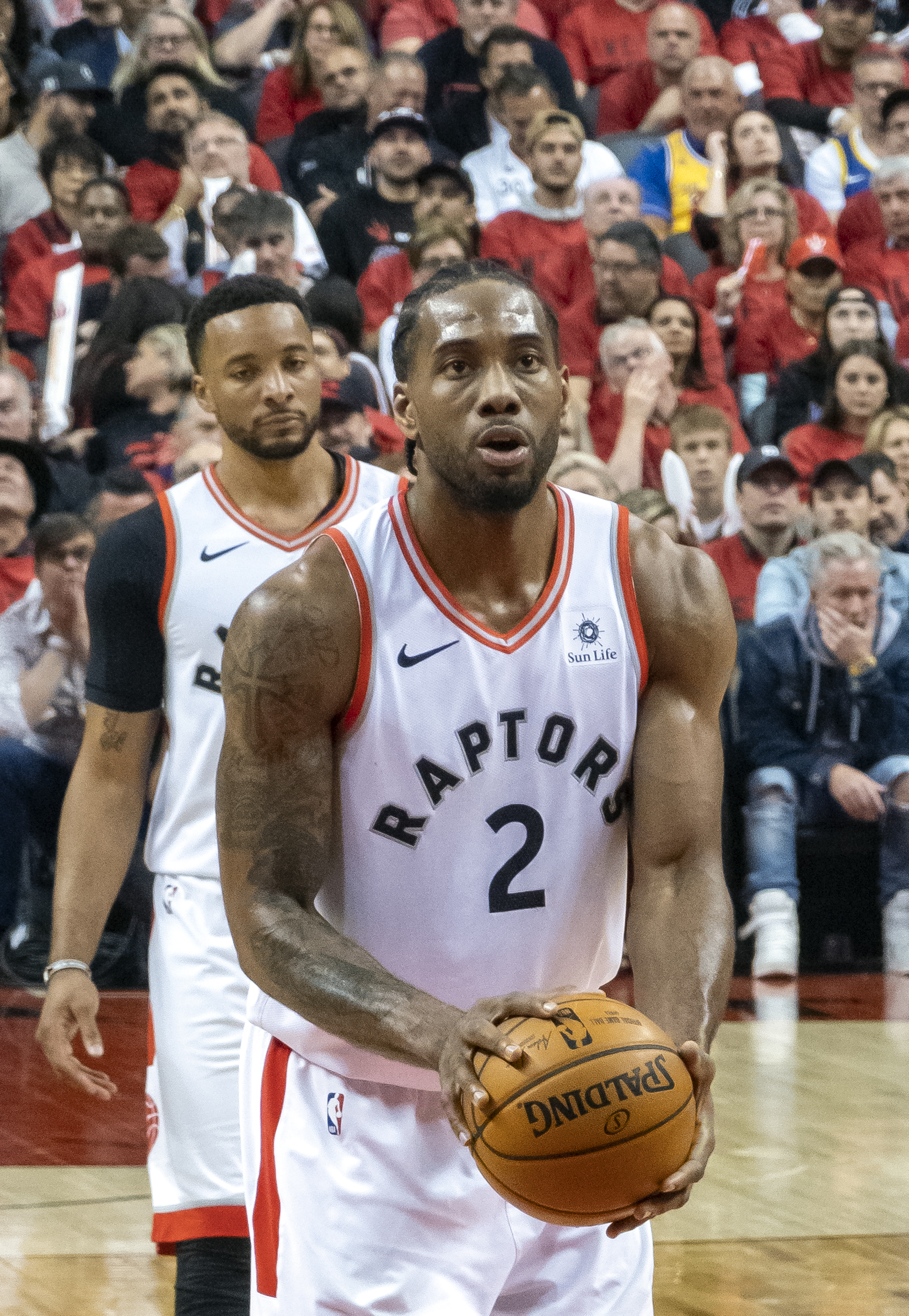
Kawhi Leonard shooting a free throw in Game 2

Thompson scored a team-high 25 points, and the Warriors outscored the Raptors 18–0 to start the second half before holding off a late Toronto rally to win 109–104. Thompson had 18 points in the first half to keep Golden State in the game. They trailed by 11 with almost two minutes left until halftime before cutting it to 59–54 at the half. The Warriors' 18 unanswered points to begin the second half were the most in NBA Finals history to start a half. Thompson left the game in the fourth quarter with a left hamstring injury after landing awkwardly on a three-point field goal attempt. Toronto scored 10 straight points to pull within two points at 106–104, but Andre Iguodala cemented the win with a three-pointer with 5.9 seconds remaining in the game.

Curry finished the game with 23 points after missing his first six shots of the game. Cousins, who was moved into the starting lineup, had 11 points, 10 rebounds and six assists, and Draymond Green had 17 points, 10 rebounds and nine assists to fall one assist short of his fourth straight triple-double. Warriors backup center Kevon Looney missed the second half with a chest contusion. Leonard led the Raptors with 34 points and 14 rebounds, and Fred VanVleet added 17 points. Game 1 star Siakam scored just 12 points on 5-for-18 shooting. Toronto was held to 37.2 percent shooting for the game.

=== Game 3 ===
SN/Citytv, RDS, ABC

June 5
9:00 pm (6:00 pm PDT)

Box score

**Toronto Raptors** **123**, Golden State Warriors 109
Scoring by quarter: **36**–29, **24**–23, **36**–31, **27**–26
Pts: Kawhi Leonard 30; Rebs: Pascal Siakam 9 Asts: Kyle Lowry 9	Pts: Stephen Curry 47; Rebs: Stephen Curry 8 Asts: Stephen Curry 7
**Toronto lead series, 2–1**

Oracle Arena, Oakland, California
Attendance: 19,596
Referees:
- No. 8 Marc Davis
- No. 16 David Guthrie
- No. 5 Kane Fitzgerald

Leonard scored 30 points and the Raptors shot 52.4 percent and made 17 three-pointers to win 123–109 on the road over the short-handed Warriors. Curry scored a playoff career-high 47 points, shooting 14 for 31 including 6 of 14 on 3-pointers, while his teammates totaled 62 points on 36.7 percent shooting. Golden State played without injured starters Thompson and Durant, and backup big man Looney. Toronto's Kyle Lowry had 23 points and five 3-pointers, and Danny Green added 18 points on 6 made 3s, as all five of their starters scored in double figures. VanVleet contributed 11 points off the bench.

Thompson practiced earlier in the day but did not warm up for the game. Kerr had said that the Warriors were not going to play him if there was risk of further damage. Looney was out with a cartilage fracture near his right collarbone.

The game was not without controversy, however, when Warriors investor Mark Stevens pushed Kyle Lowry while attempting to dive for a loose ball, a gesture for which Stevens was banned from attending Warriors games for one year.

=== Game 4 ===
TSN/CTV 2, RDS, ABC

June 7
9:00 pm (6:00 pm PDT)

Box score

**Toronto Raptors** **105**, Golden State Warriors 92
Scoring by quarter: 17–**23**, **25**–23, **37**–21, **26**–25
Pts: Kawhi Leonard 36; Rebs: Kawhi Leonard 12; Asts: Kyle Lowry 7	Pts: Klay Thompson 28; Rebs: Draymond Green 9 Asts: Draymond Green 12
**Toronto lead series, 3–1**

Oracle Arena, Oakland, California
Attendance: 19,596
Referees:
- No. 24 Mike Callahan
- No. 15 Zach Zarba
- No. 42 Eric Lewis

Toronto took a 3–1 lead in the series after Leonard scored 36 points and had 12 rebounds in a 105–92 road win over Golden State. The Raptors struggled early, falling behind by 11 early in the contest and only scoring 17 points in the opening period, before trailing 46–42 at halftime. They outscored the Warriors 37–21 in the third quarter, when Leonard scored 17 of his points, and led by as many as 16 in the final quarter. Serge Ibaka scored 20 points for Toronto, shooting 9 for 12 in 22 minutes off the bench. Thompson returned from injury to lead Golden State with 28 points, including six 3-pointers.

Siakam added 19 points for the Raptors. VanVleet needed seven stitches in the fourth quarter after the Warriors' Shaun Livingston inadvertently elbowed him in the face. The only other player to score over 10 points for Golden State, Curry, had 27 points, but shot just 9 for 22 and missed 7 of his 9 three-point attempts. Looney returned to score 10 points after Kerr initially declared him out for the series following his Game 2 injury.

=== Game 5 ===
SN/Citytv, RDS, ABC

June 10
9:00pm

Box score

**Golden State Warriors** **106**, Toronto Raptors 105
Scoring by quarter: **34**–28, 28–28, 22–22, 22–**27**
Pts: Stephen Curry 31; Rebs: Draymond Green 10; Asts: Draymond Green 8	Pts: Kawhi Leonard 26; Rebs: Kawhi Leonard 12; Asts: Leonard, Lowry 6 each
**Toronto lead series, 3–2**

Scotiabank Arena, Toronto, Ontario
Attendance: 20,144
Referees:
- No. 19 James Capers
- No. 23 Jason Phillips
- No. 14 Ed Malloy

Curry scored 31 points and Thompson had 26 to help the Warriors stave off elimination with a 106–105 win at Toronto. They combined for three straight 3-pointers after the Raptors led by six points with 3 1/2 minutes left in the game. Durant returned after missing the previous nine games with his right calf injury, and scored 11 points in the first quarter. However, he was lost for the game two minutes into the second quarter when he tried to drive by Ibaka and suffered a ruptured Achilles tendon, falling and grabbing his lower right calf. He limped off the court and was helped to the locker room. Leonard scored 10 straight points in the fourth quarter to erase Golden State's 14-point lead. Lowry's potential championship-winning, 3-point shot at the buzzer fell short after it was partially blocked by Draymond Green.

Golden State made 20 three-pointers, the second most in NBA Finals history behind Cleveland's 24 against the Warriors in Game 4 in 2017. Cousins, who did not enter the game until Durant's injury, had 14 points and six rebounds for the Warriors, and Green added 10 points, 10 rebounds and eight assists. Leonard had 26 points for the Raptors, while Lowry added 18 and Gasol 17 to lead six Raptors in double figures. Golden State played most of the second half without Looney, who aggravated his cartilage fracture after colliding with Lowry while battling for a rebound.

Durant left the arena on crutches and in a walking boot. "I don't believe there's anybody to blame [for Durant's injury], but I understand in this world, and if you have to, you can blame me," said Bob Myers, the Warriors' president of basketball operations. Durant underwent surgery to repair the tendon and was at risk of missing all of the following season. Originally expected to become a free agent after the 2018–19 season, he had a $31.5 million option to remain with Golden State for another season, but it was ultimately his last appearance with the Warriors, after a sign-and-trade to the Nets the following month.

Nurse was criticized for calling a timeout with Toronto up 103–97 after going on a 12–2 run; the Splash Brothers' three 3-pointers came after the break. In its Last Two Minutes report, the NBA stated that Cousins should have been called for a shooting foul on Gasol with 49 seconds left in the game, which would have given Gasol two free throws with the Raptors trailing 106–103 at the time.

=== Game 6 ===
TSN/CTV, RDS, ABC

June 13
9:00pm (6:00 pm PDT)

Box score

**Toronto Raptors** **114**, Golden State Warriors 110
Scoring by quarter: **33**–32, **27**–25, 26–**31**, **28**–22
Pts: Siakam, Lowry 26 each Rebs: Pascal Siakam 10; Asts: Kyle Lowry 10	Pts: Klay Thompson 30; Rebs: Draymond Green 19; Asts: Draymond Green 13
**Toronto wins NBA Finals, 4–2**

Oracle Arena, Oakland, California
Attendance: 19,596
Referees:
- No. 8 Marc Davis
- No. 16 David Guthrie
- No. 30 John Goble

External videos
- Full game broadcast by ABC on YouTube

Leonard scored 22 points and had six rebounds and was named the NBA Finals MVP after Toronto won 114–110 over Golden State to claim its first championship in franchise history. Thompson scored a game-high 30 points for the Warriors, but was lost for the game with 2:22 remaining in the third quarter after landing awkwardly and suffering a torn anterior cruciate ligament (ACL) in his left knee on a drive to the basket contested by Danny Green. With the Raptors leading 111–110, the Warriors managed to force a turnover with 9.6 seconds left in the game, but Curry missed a three-pointer that would have forced a Game 7. Trying to secure the ball after the miss, Iguodala called a timeout, but the Warriors did not have any left, and were assessed a technical foul. It was academic, as time would have otherwise expired had they not attempted to stop the clock. Leonard was awarded three free throws to seal the Raptors' first-ever NBA championship title.

Lowry and Siakam led Toronto with 26 points each. Lowry scored 11 of his points in the first two-plus minutes of the contest. Van Vleet finished with 22 points, including 12 in the final period, and made five of the team's 13 three-pointers. Siakam added 10 rebounds. Curry had 21 points for Golden State, but he was hounded by the Raptors in the fourth quarter without Durant or Thompson available. Draymond Green had a triple-double with 11 points, 19 rebounds and 13 assists, but committed eight turnovers. Iguodala had 22 points despite shooting only 1 of 5 on free throws.

Leonard averaged 28.5 points per game in the series, and joined Kareem Abdul-Jabbar and LeBron James as the only players to be named Finals MVP with two different teams. Toronto was the first Canadian team to win the NBA title and the first non-American team to win any of the Big Four North American sports titles since the Toronto Blue Jays of Major League Baseball won the World Series in October of 1993. This was the Warriors' last game ever at Oracle Arena, as they moved to the new Chase Center across the bay in San Francisco at the beginning of the 2019–20 season. They finished 0–3 at home in the series. The road team won the last five games of the series, the longest string of road wins in one Finals.

==== Incident between Raptors president and law enforcement ====
Moments after the game's conclusion, Raptors executive Masai Ujiri was barred by an Alameda County Sheriff deputy from walking onto the floor for the team's trophy presentation, leading to an altercation between the two men.

Body camera footage eventually released to the public revealed that Dep. Alan Strickland had shoved Ujiri twice in the chest after the executive had tried to access the court, prompting Ujiri to shove him back. The two men appeared to stare each other down for several seconds before the Raptors' Kyle Lowry arrived, embracing Ujiri and escorting him onto the floor for the celebration.

While the footage does not display Ujiri wearing the credentials that would have allowed him to walk onto the floor, he is heard identifying himself as "president of the Raptors" while holding up the credentials he did have.

Following the incident, Sheriff Greg Ahearn said he would recommend battery charges against Ujiri. However, after privately meeting with Ujiri and his lawyers, representatives from the county District Attorney's office announced there would be no criminal charges filed against him.

Strickland separately sued Ujiri for $75,000, claiming to have suffered a concussion during the altercation. Ujiri countersued, and the two men later dropped their filings.

== Rosters ==
=== Toronto Raptors ===
2018–19 Toronto Raptors roster
Players

Pos.	No.	Player	Height	Weight	DOB	From
F	3	OG Anunoby	6 ft 8 in (2.03 m)	232 lb (105 kg)	1997–07–17	Indiana
F	25	Chris Boucher	6 ft 10 in (2.08 m)	200 lb (91 kg)	1993–01–11	Oregon
C	33	Marc Gasol	7 ft 1 in (2.16 m)	255 lb (116 kg)	1985–01–29	Spain
G/F	14	Danny Green	6 ft 6 in (1.98 m)	215 lb (98 kg)	1987–06–22	North Carolina
F/C	9	Serge Ibaka	6 ft 10 in (2.08 m)	235 lb (107 kg)	1989–09–18	Republic of the Congo
F	2	Kawhi Leonard	6 ft 7 in (2.01 m)	230 lb (104 kg)	1991–06–29	San Diego State
G	17	Jeremy Lin	6 ft 3 in (1.91 m)	200 lb (91 kg)	1988–08–23	Harvard
G	7	Kyle Lowry	6 ft 0 in (1.83 m)	196 lb (89 kg)	1986–03–25	Villanova
G	8	Jordan Loyd (TW)	6 ft 4 in (1.93 m)	210 lb (95 kg)	1993–07–27	Indianapolis
G	1	Patrick McCaw	6 ft 7 in (2.01 m)	185 lb (84 kg)	1995–10–25	UNLV
SG	20	Jodie Meeks	6 ft 4 in (1.93 m)	210 lb (95 kg)	1987–08–21	Kentucky
F	13	Malcolm Miller	6 ft 7 in (2.01 m)	210 lb (95 kg)	1993–03–06	Holy Cross
F/C	15	Eric Moreland	6 ft 10 in (2.08 m)	238 lb (108 kg)	1991–12–24	Oregon State
G/F	24	Norman Powell	6 ft 4 in (1.93 m)	215 lb (98 kg)	1993–05–25	UCLA
F	43	Pascal Siakam	6 ft 9 in (2.06 m)	230 lb (104 kg)	1994–04–02	New Mexico State
G	23	Fred VanVleet	6 ft 0 in (1.83 m)	195 lb (88 kg)	1994–02–25	Wichita State

Coaches
**Head coach**
- Nick Nurse
**Assistant(s)**
- Nate Bjorkgren
- Adrian Griffin
- Phil Handy
- Eric Khoury
- Alex McKechnie
- Patrick Mutombo
- Jim Sann
- Sergio Scariolo

**Legend**
- **(DP)** Unsigned draft pick
- **(FA)** Free agent
- **(S)** Suspended
- **(GL)** On assignment to G League affiliate
- **(TW)** Two-way affiliate player
- Injured

Roster

=== Golden State Warriors ===
2018–19 Golden State Warriors roster
Players

Pos.	No.	Player	Height	Weight	DOB	From
F	2	Jordan Bell	6 ft 9 in (2.06 m)	224 lb (102 kg)	1995–01–07	Oregon
C	12	Andrew Bogut	7 ft 0 in (2.13 m)	260 lb (118 kg)	1984–11–28	Utah
G	4	Quinn Cook	6 ft 2 in (1.88 m)	179 lb (81 kg)	1993–03–23	Duke
C	0	DeMarcus Cousins	6 ft 11 in (2.11 m)	270 lb (122 kg)	1990–08–13	Kentucky
G	30	Stephen Curry	6 ft 3 in (1.91 m)	190 lb (86 kg)	1988–03–14	Davidson
F	32	Marcus Derrickson (TW)	6 ft 7 in (2.01 m)	249 lb (113 kg)	1996–02–01	Georgetown
F	35	Kevin Durant	6 ft 9 in (2.06 m)	240 lb (109 kg)	1988–09–29	Texas
G	10	Jacob Evans	6 ft 6 in (1.98 m)	210 lb (95 kg)	1997–06–18	Cincinnati
F	23	Draymond Green	6 ft 7 in (2.01 m)	230 lb (104 kg)	1990–03–04	Michigan State
G/F	9	Andre Iguodala	6 ft 6 in (1.98 m)	215 lb (98 kg)	1984–01–28	Arizona
F	21	Jonas Jerebko	6 ft 10 in (2.08 m)	231 lb (105 kg)	1987–03–02	Sweden
C	15	Damian Jones	7 ft 0 in (2.13 m)	245 lb (111 kg)	1995–06–30	Vanderbilt
G	1	Damion Lee (TW)	6 ft 6 in (1.98 m)	210 lb (95 kg)	1992–10–21	Louisville
G	34	Shaun Livingston	6 ft 7 in (2.01 m)	192 lb (87 kg)	1985–09–11	Peoria HS (IL)
F/C	5	Kevon Looney	6 ft 9 in (2.06 m)	220 lb (100 kg)	1996–02–06	UCLA
F	28	Alfonzo McKinnie	6 ft 8 in (2.03 m)	215 lb (98 kg)	1992–09–17	Green Bay
G	11	Klay Thompson	6 ft 7 in (2.01 m)	215 lb (98 kg)	1990–02–08	Washington State

Coaches
**Head coach**
- Steve Kerr
**Assistant(s)**
- Mike Brown
- Bruce Fraser
- Ron Adams
- Jarron Collins
- Chris DeMarco (assistant coach &
  director of player development)
- Willie Green (player development)

**Legend**
- **(DP)** Unsigned draft pick
- **(FA)** Free agent
- **(S)** Suspended
- **(GL)** On assignment to G League affiliate
- **(TW)** Two-way affiliate player
- Injured

Roster

== Player statistics ==
Legend
GP	Games played	GS	Games started	MPG	Minutes per game
FG%	Field-goal percentage	3P%	3-point field-goal percentage	FT%	Free-throw percentage
RPG	Rebounds per game	APG	Assists per game	SPG	Steals per game
BPG	Blocks per game	PPG	Points per game

Golden State Warriors

Golden State Warriors statistics
Player	GP	GS	MPG	FG%	3P%	FT%	RPG	APG	SPG	BPG	PPG
Stephen Curry	6	6	**41.7**	.414	.343	.947	5.2	6.0	1.5	0.2	**30.5**
Klay Thompson	5	5	37.6	.541	.585	.875	4.8	2.4	0.8	0.0	26.0
Draymond Green	6	6	41.2	.433	.263	.857	**10.8**	**9.3**	**1.7**	1.0	12.5
Kevin Durant	1	1	12.0	.600	**1.000**	**1.000**	2.0	0.0	0.0	1.0	11.0
Andre Iguodala	6	6	31.4	.431	.308	.333	4.5	4.0	1.0	**1.5**	9.2
DeMarcus Cousins	6	3	18.0	.425	.222	.609	4.7	2.3	0.7	1.0	8.3
Kevon Looney	5	1	20.8	.583	.000	.250	3.2	1.2	0.4	0.2	5.8
Quinn Cook	6	0	14.7	.379	.313	**1.000**	0.8	0.8	0.2	0.2	4.8
Shaun Livingston	6	1	16.3	.417	.000	**1.000**	1.5	1.5	0.7	0.2	4.7
Jonas Jerebko	4	0	6.5	.286	.375	.750	1.3	0.3	0.0	0.0	3.5
Andrew Bogut	5	0	8.9	**.750**	.000	.000	3.0	0.6	0.2	0.2	2.4
Alfonzo McKinnie	6	0	9.6	.313	.300	.000	1.7	0.3	0.0	0.0	2.2
Jordan Bell	4	1	6.3	.750	.000	.000	1.3	0.3	0.0	0.5	1.5
Jacob Evans	3	0	0.6	.000	.000	.000	0.0	0.0	0.0	0.0	0.0
Damian Jones	1	0	1.6	.000	.000	.000	0.0	0.0	0.0	0.0	0.0

Toronto Raptors

Toronto Raptors statistics
Player	GP	GS	MPG	FG%	3P%	FT%	RPG	APG	SPG	BPG	PPG
Kawhi Leonard	6	6	**40.5**	.434	.357	.906	**9.8**	4.2	**2.0**	1.5	**29.5**
Pascal Siakam	6	6	40.1	.505	.238	.762	7.3	3.7	0.5	0.7	19.8
Kyle Lowry	6	6	38.1	.425	.368	.789	4.0	**7.2**	1.7	0.5	16.2
Fred VanVleet	6	0	32.4	.444	.400	.857	2.7	2.2	1.2	0.0	14.0
Marc Gasol	6	6	28.8	.447	.316	.923	7.3	2.7	0.5	0.3	12.0
Serge Ibaka	6	0	19.3	**.560**	.333	.769	5.2	1.0	0.8	**1.7**	11.3
Danny Green	6	6	27.2	.390	.364	.000	3.5	1.2	1.2	0.5	7.3
Norman Powell	6	0	11.0	.308	.167	**1.000**	1.0	0.7	0.3	0.0	1.8
Patrick McCaw	4	0	3.1	.500	**1.000**	.000	0.0	0.5	0.0	0.0	0.8
Jeremy Lin	1	0	0.9	.000	.000	.000	0.0	0.0	0.0	0.0	0.0
Jodie Meeks	1	0	0.9	.000	.000	.000	0.0	0.0	0.0	0.0	0.0
Malcolm Miller	1	0	0.9	.000	.000	.000	0.0	0.0	0.0	0.0	0.0

- Bold: team high

== Sponsorship ==
As part of a multiyear partnership that began in 2018, the internet television service YouTube TV was the presenting sponsor of the series, even in Canada despite its lack of legal availability there at the time, which was officially named the NBA Finals 2019 presented by YouTube TV.

== Media coverage ==
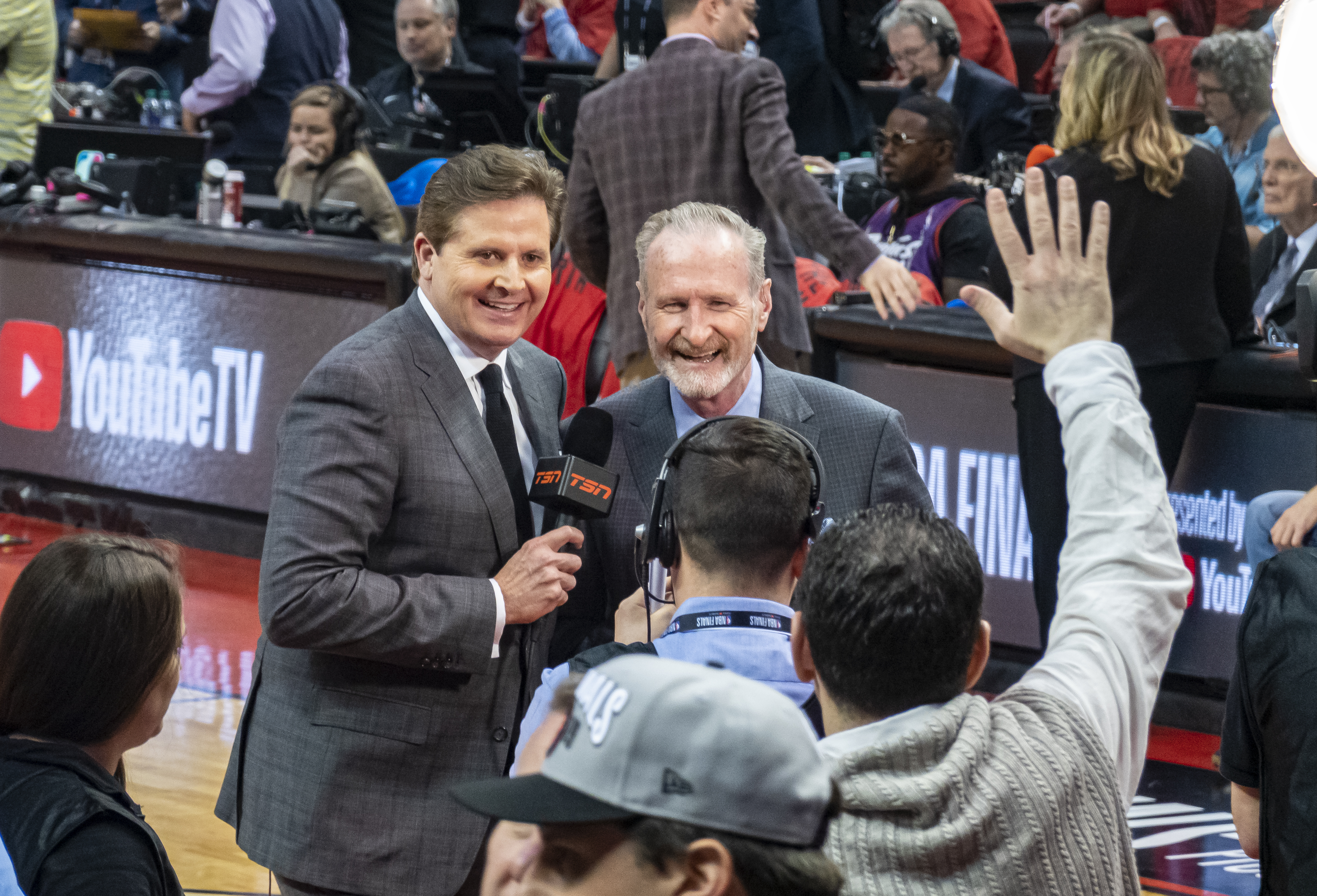
Toronto Raptors commentary team members Matt Devlin and Jack Armstrong in the Scotiabank Arena during Game 2; note the advertisement of YouTube TV (despite its lack of legal availability there at the time) behind the announcers

In the United States, the Finals was televised by ABC in English (including local station KGO-TV in San Francisco) and ESPN Deportes in Spanish. Play-by-play commentator Mike Breen, and analysts Mark Jackson and Jeff Van Gundy called the series on ABC, while Álvaro Martín (play-by-play) and Carlos Morales (analyst) were on ESPN Deportes. This was also the last Finals to feature Doris Burke as a television sideline reporter, before moving to ESPN Radio as an analyst.

In Canada, the Raptors' and the NBA's main local rightsholders, Sportsnet (which aired games 1, 3, and 5, and would have aired game 7) and TSN (games 2, 4, and 6) aired separate, local telecasts with the Raptors' commentary team of Matt Devlin on play-by-play, and Leo Rautins (Sportsnet) or Jack Armstrong (TSN) as analysts. TSN sister broadcast television network CTV 2 aired simulcasts of ABC's feed for games 2 and 4 in order to enforce simultaneous substitution rights on ABC stations carried on pay television, while game 6 was simulcast on CTV. Sportsnet's sister broadcast network Citytv similarly simulcast games 3 and 5. RDS broadcast all six games in French.

As the NBA's sole Canadian franchise, the Raptors' parent company Maple Leaf Sports & Entertainment (which was majority owned at the time between a partnership of Sportsnet and TSN's respective owners, Rogers Communications and BCE Inc.) managed the league's national media rights in Canada. The series marked the first time that a team's regional broadcaster has produced its own coverage of games during the NBA Finals; these local broadcasts had access to ABC's camera feeds, along with additional cameras that were part of its own production resources.

=== Viewership ===
In Canada, Game 1 recorded an average of 3.3 million viewers on Sportsnet, making it the highest-rated NBA game in Canadian history. By contrast, with 10.77 million U.S. viewers, Game 1 was the second lowest-rated NBA Finals game in the U.S. after the 2020 NBA Finals. Analysts cited both the presence of a Canadian team (Canadian viewership does not count towards U.S. Nielsen ratings, leading to only one U.S. home market being reflected in viewership, being the San Francisco Bay Area market), and being the first NBA Finals not to feature a team with LeBron James since 2011, as factors in the drop. In the Warriors' home market, ratings were also lower in comparison to its past Game 1 appearances.

The Canadian record would be surpassed by Game 2, with an average of 4.3 million across TSN, the French-language broadcast on RDS, and CTV2's simulcast of ABC's broadcast, and an estimate that the game was seen at any point by at least 10 million viewers. The game also had a 68 percent ratings share in the Toronto–Hamilton market. Game 3 was seen by 3.8 million viewers across Sportsnet and Citytv. The downward trend of U.S. viewership continued on Game 4, with a 9.8 share for the Friday-night game (a 12.5 percent year-over-year decline over Game 4 in 2018). TSN reported average viewership of 4.631 million, surpassing Canadian NBA viewership records for the third time in the series.

U.S. Game 5 viewership was 37% higher over Game 4, at 18.22 million, while Sportsnet reported an average of 6.4 million viewers across Sportsnet and the Citytv simulcast of ABC coverage—surpassing the series finale of The Big Bang Theory (4.33 million), Super Bowl LIII (4.34 million), and the 91st Academy Awards (5.21 million) as the most-watched television broadcast of 2019 in Canada, and once again the most-watched NBA telecast in Canada. The NBA itself estimated 6.9 million viewers when accounting for the French-language feed on RDS and estimated viewership on out-of-market stations.

Game 6 further exceeded these numbers with an average of 7.7 million. TSN publicized that a total of 15.9 million unique viewers watched some point of the telecast, and 9.99 million were watching during the final minute. TSN also reported that Game 6 had an 82 percent share of viewers in the Toronto–Hamilton market—which it stated to be the highest in the region for a sports broadcast outside of the Olympic Games, summer or winter. Game 6's ratings in the United States were slightly higher over Game 5, with 18.34 million.

Game	Ratings (American households)	American audience (in millions)	Canadian average audience (in millions)	Ref
1	7.9	13.31	3.3	
2	8.0	13.88	4.3	
3	7.8	13.10	3.8	
4	7.6	12.79	4.6	
5	10.6	18.22	6.4	
6	10.7	18.34	7.7	
Avg	8.77	14.94	5.021	

== Victory parade ==
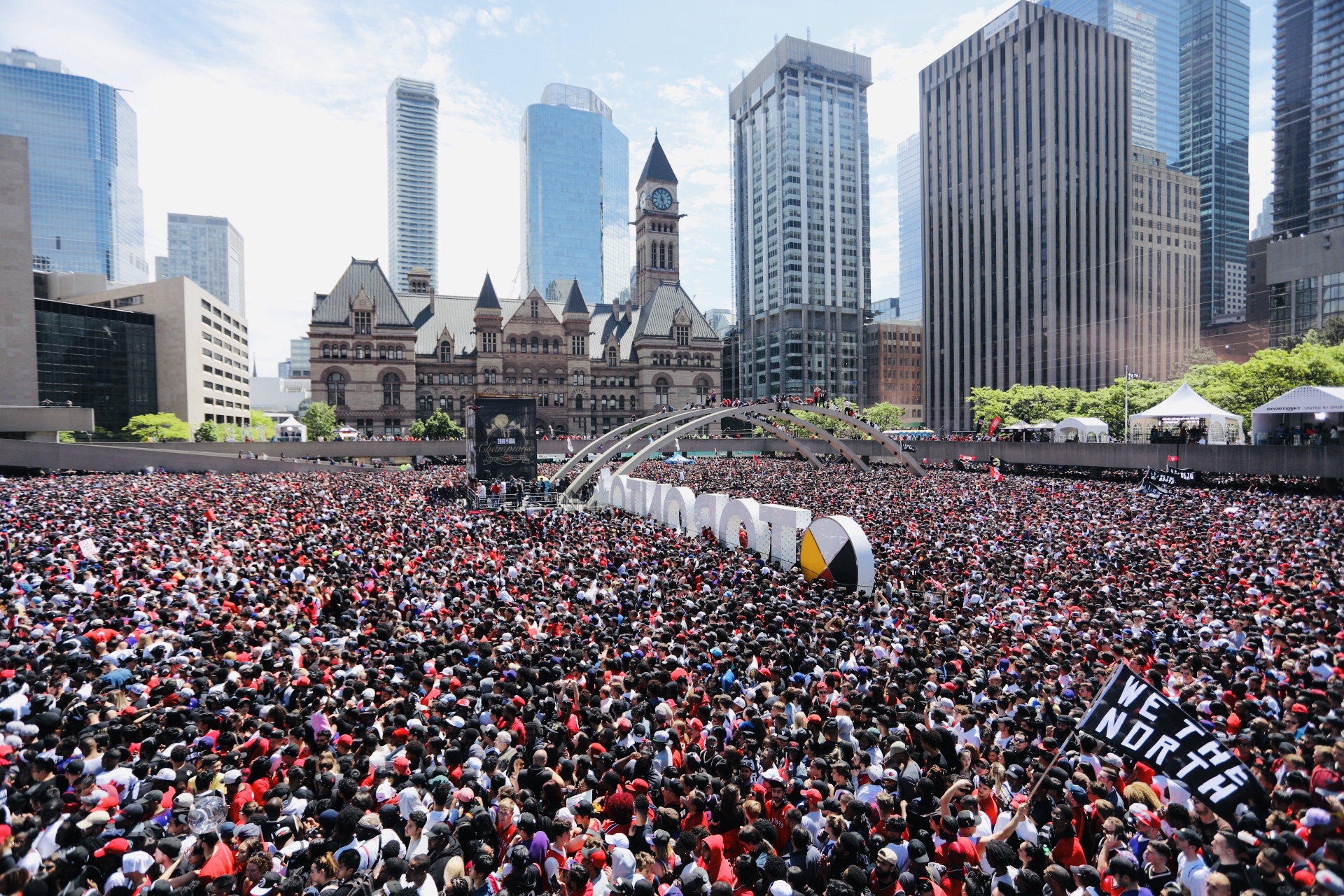
Toronto's Nathan Phillips Square on June 17, 2019, with crowds surrounding the Toronto Sign during the victory parade

On June 17, the Raptors held a victory parade in Downtown Toronto, which began at the Princes' Gates at the east end of Exhibition Place, traveled east along Lake Shore Boulevard West, north along York Street and University Avenue, east along Queen Street West, and finished at Nathan Phillips Square next to Toronto City Hall. The parade was attended by an estimated crowd of two million fans, making this the largest public gathering in one place for one event in Canadian history, peacetime or wartime. However, due to this overcrowding, the parade was delayed an additional three hours as numerous fans bypassed the barricades, blocking the parade route. In addition, excessive crowds delayed emergency services from attending to people in the crowd falling ill from heat exhaustion and dehydration, which resulted in the death of an infant. Later on, the parade was marred by shootings, which occurred during the victory speeches. The shootings wounded four people, though did not inflict life-threatening injuries, and caused a stampede. Three suspects were arrested and two guns were recovered. 2 Toronto Transit Events Support buses along with a few bus shelters and police cars were destroyed.

== Aftermath ==
=== Warriors ===
In the offseason, Kevin Durant left to join the Brooklyn Nets, but did not play until the 2020–21 season due to the Achilles injury he suffered in the Finals. Meanwhile, Klay Thompson did not play for the next two seasons due to the ACL injury he suffered in the Finals, and an Achilles tear he suffered in the succeeding offseason.

Without Thompson and Stephen Curry for most of the pandemic-shortened 2019–20 season, the Warriors finished with a conference-worst and league-worst 15–50 record, and did not qualify for the Orlando bubble in the summer. In the 72-game 2020–21 season, they finished eighth in the conference with 39 wins and qualified for the play-in tournament, but lost to the Los Angeles Lakers and the Memphis Grizzlies in the first and second phases, respectively. However, with Thompson and Curry back and healthy, the Warriors finished the 2021–22 season third in the conference with 53 wins, and eventually defeated the Boston Celtics in six games of the 2022 NBA Finals, with Curry winning his first NBA Finals MVP.

=== Raptors ===
In the 2019 offseason, Kawhi Leonard signed with the Los Angeles Clippers after only one season in Toronto. Nevertheless, the Raptors still finished the 2019–20 season 53–19 and were invited to the Orlando bubble during the summer. However, they lost in seven games to the Boston Celtics in the second round of the playoffs. The following season, the Raptors were forced to play all of their home games at Amalie Arena in Tampa due to Canadian travel restrictions brought on by the pandemic. The team finished the season out of the playoffs with 27 wins. Later, general manager Masai Ujiri would say this temporary move set the franchise back years. In the 2021–22 season, the Raptors resumed playing home games in Toronto and ended with 48 wins; however, they lost in the opening round to the Philadelphia 76ers. Toronto missed the playoffs for the next 3 seasons, finishing with a losing record in each year. In addition, with Chris Boucher's departure to the Boston Celtics in the 2025 offseason, the 2018-19 Raptors are the most recent NBA champion to not have a championship player remaining on their team up to the 2025-26 NBA season. The Raptors would become the last team to win the NBA championship on their debut appearance until the Denver Nuggets in 2023.

Kawhi Leonard's playoff run in 2019 is considered one of the best ever for a star player, as he averaged 30.5 points, 9.1 rebounds and 3.9 assists across 24 games.
