= List of most watched television broadcasts in Canada =

The following is a list of most watched television broadcasts in Canada based on average viewership of the broadcasts. In recent years, the Super Bowl has frequently been the most-watched television broadcast of the year in Canada. The most-watched television broadcast in Canadian history was the gold medal game of the men's hockey tournament at the 2010 Winter Olympics, played between the United States and Canada in Vancouver, with an average minute audience of 16.6 million Canadians watching the game, roughly one-half of Canada's population in 2010.

== Criteria for inclusion ==
The lists below include programs that were broadcast in Canada, regardless of their country of origin. Where applicable, these lists also factor in simultaneous substitution of American programs airing on Canadian networks (such as The Big Bang Theory on CTV). These lists also aggregate the English and French language broadcasts of sports programming (such as Super Bowl LIV on CTV, TSN, RDS).

These lists do not combine the viewership of major events that have been individually covered by multiple Canadian broadcasters simultaneously (such as the September 11th attacks). Where applicable, sporting event pre-game and post-game shows (as identified in Numeris data) are also excluded entirely, as they benefit from the strong lead-in or lead-out of the live sports broadcast, and otherwise would not be aired. Viewership obtained through reruns is not combined into the figures for the original broadcast, as reruns are considered separate airings of the same program.

The viewership figures listed are based on live plus seven day average minute audience data from Numeris (which includes DVR viewing up to seven days after broadcast). Peak audience and total reach figures are not listed. Since 2022, Numeris has limited public access to its data, where available, additional publicly accessible sources may be listed for individual broadcasts. The viewership figures listed on these publicly available sources may differ slightly from the viewership listed here, as not all public disclosures of viewership data include French language simulcasts, not all are based on the final published live plus seven day averages, and some may only include preliminary data based on one day of viewing and instead of seven.

== Legend ==
- Indicates broadcast from an Olympic Games.
- Indicates broadcast unrelated to sports.

== Most watched broadcasts ==
The following is a list of the twenty most watched television broadcasts in Canada by average minute audience from at least 2024–2025, with primary audience measurement according to Numeris.

Seven of the twenty most watched broadcasts took place during the 2010 Winter Olympics which were hosted by the Canadian city of Vancouver. During these Olympics, a new consortium was formed by some of Canada's major private broadcasting companies to simulcast many Olympic events. As such, many of the top twenty broadcasts listed below aired on multiple participating networks of the Olympic consortium, which is referred to as the National Olympic Network on Numeris ratings reports.

No.	Show	Viewership (millions)	Date	Network(s)	Ref.
1	2010 Winter Olympics: Men's hockey - gold medal game: Canada vs. United States	16.67	February 28, 2010	Canada's Olympic Broadcast Media Consortium	
2	2010 Winter Olympics closing ceremony	14.44	February 28, 2010	Canada's Olympic Broadcast Media Consortium	
3	2010 Winter Olympics opening ceremony	13.50	February 12, 2010	Canada's Olympic Broadcast Media Consortium	
4	2025 World Series – Game 7: LA Dodgers vs. Toronto	11.6	November 1, 2025	Sportsnet, TVA Sports, Citytv	
5	2010 Winter Olympics: Men's hockey – preliminary round game: Canada vs. United States	10.68	February 21, 2010	Canada's Olympic Broadcast Media Consortium	
6	2010 Winter Olympics: Men's hockey – quarterfinal game: Russia vs. Canada	10.56	February 24, 2010	Canada's Olympic Broadcast Media Consortium	
7	2002 Winter Olympics: Men's hockey – gold medal game: United States vs. Canada	10.30	February 22, 2002	CBC, Radio-Canada	
8	2025 World Series – Game 6: LA Dodgers vs. Toronto	10.2	October 31, 2025	Sportsnet, Citytv, TVA Sports	
9	Super Bowl LVIII: San Francisco vs. Kansas City	10.1	February 11, 2024	CTV, TSN, RDS	
10	2010 Winter Olympics: Men's hockey – semifinal game: Canada vs. Slovakia	9.87	February 26, 2010	Canada's Olympic Broadcast Media Consortium	
11	2011 Stanley Cup Final – Game 7: Boston vs. Vancouver	9.69	June 15, 2011	CBC, RDS	
12	Super Bowl LIV: San Francisco vs. Kansas City	9.6	February 2, 2020	CTV, TSN, RDS	
13	Super Bowl XLIX: New England vs. Seattle	9.16	February 1, 2015	CTV, RDS	
14	Super Bowl LV: Kansas City vs. Tampa	8.92	February 7, 2021	CTV, TSN, RDS	
15	Super Bowl LVII: Kansas City vs. Philadelphia	8.7	February 12, 2023	CTV, TSN, RDS	
16	2026 Winter Olympics: Men's hockey - gold medal game: United States vs. Canada	8.5	February 22, 2026	CBC Sports	
17	2014 Winter Olympics: Men's hockey - gold medal game: Sweden vs. Canada	8.5	February 23, 2014	CBC Sports	
18	Super Bowl LIX: Kansas City vs. Philadelphia	8.4	February 9, 2025	CTV, TSN, RDS	
19	Super Bowl 50: Carolina vs. Denver	8.32	February 7, 2016	CTV, RDS	
20	Super Bowl XLVI: NY Giants vs. New England	8.178	February 5, 2012	CTV, RDS	

== Most watched television broadcasts by year ==
Each list below contains the top ten most watched television broadcasts in Canada within a calendar year, according to Numeris live plus seven day average minute audience measurement figures (which includes DVR viewing up to seven days after broadcast).

=== 2025 ===
The following is a list of the most watched television broadcasts of 2025.

No.	Show	Viewership (in millions)	Date	Network(s)
1	2025 World Series - Game 7: LA Dodgers vs. Toronto	11.6	November 1, 2025	Sportsnet, Citytv, TVA Sports
2	2025 World Series - Game 6: LA Dodgers vs. Toronto	10.2	October 31, 2025	Sportsnet, Citytv, TVA Sports
3	Super Bowl LIX: Kansas City vs. Philadelphia	8.4	February 9, 2025	CTV, TSN, RDS
4	2025 World Series - Game 5: LA Dodgers vs. Toronto	7.8	October 29, 2025	Sportsnet, Citytv, TVA Sports
5	2025 World Series - Game 1: LA Dodgers vs. Toronto	7.5	October 24, 2025	Sportsnet, Citytv, TVA Sports
6	4 Nations Face-Off - Final: Canada vs. United States	6.9	February 20, 2025	Sportsnet, TVA Sports
7	2025 World Series - Game 2: LA Dodgers vs. Toronto	6.89	October 25, 2025	Sportsnet, Citytv, TVA Sports
8	2025 World Series - Game 4: LA Dodgers vs. Toronto	6.6	October 28, 2025	Sportsnet, Citytv, TVA Sports
9	2025 American League Championship Series - Game 7: Seattle vs. Toronto	6.29	October 20, 2025	Sportsnet, TVA Sports
10	2025 World Series - Game 3: LA Dodgers vs. Toronto	6.26	October 27, 2025	Sportsnet, Citytv, TVA Sports

=== 2024 ===
The following is a list of the most watched television broadcasts of 2024.

No.	Show	Viewership (in millions)	Date	Network(s)
1	Super Bowl LVIII: San Francisco vs. Kansas City	10.1	February 11, 2024	CTV, TSN, RDS
2	Stanley Cup Final - Game 7: Edmonton vs. Florida	7.59	June 24, 2024	CBC, Sportsnet, TVA Sports
3	Stanley Cup Playoffs - Round 1 - Game 7: Boston vs. Toronto	5.27	May 4, 2024	CBC, Sportsnet, TVA Sports
4	Stanley Cup Final - Game 6: Edmonton vs. Florida	4.92	June 21, 2024	CBC, Sportsnet, TVA Sports
5	Bye Bye 2024	4.29	December 31, 2024	Ici Radio-Canada Télé
6	Stanley Cup Final - Game 5: Edmonton vs. Florida	4.03	June 18, 2024	CBC, Sportsnet, TVA Sports
7	Stanley Cup Playoffs - Round 1 - Game 6: Boston vs. Toronto	3.83	May 2, 2024	CBC, Sportsnet, TVA Sports
8	96th Academy Awards	3.72	Mar 10, 2024	CTV
9	2024 Summer Olympics closing ceremony	3.71	August 11, 2024	CBC consortium
10	Stanley Cup Final - Game 4: Edmonton vs. Florida	3.69	June 15, 2024	CBC, Sportsnet, TVA Sports

=== 2023 ===
The following is a list of the most watched television broadcasts of 2023.

No.	Show	Viewership (in millions)	Date	Network(s)
1	Super Bowl LVII: Kansas City vs. Philadelphia	8.7	February 12, 2023	CTV, TSN, RDS
2	2023 IIHF World Junior Championship Gold Medal Game: Czechia vs. Canada	4.777	January 5, 2023	TSN, RDS
3	Stanley Cup Playoffs - Round 1 - Game 6: Tampa Bay vs. Toronto	4.775	April 29, 2023	CBC, Sportsnet, TVA Sports
4	Stanley Cup Playoffs - Round 2 - Game 5: Florida vs. Toronto	4.2	May 12, 2023	CBC, Sportsnet, TVA Sports
5	2023 IIHF World Junior Championship semifinal game: United States vs. Canada	4.0	January 4, 2023	TSN, RDS
6	Stanley Cup Playoffs - Round 2 - Game 3: Florida vs. Toronto	3.8	May 7, 2023	CBC, Sportsnet, TVA Sports
7	Stanley Cup Playoffs - Round 2 - Game 2: Florida vs. Toronto	3.638	May 4, 2023	CBC, Sportsnet, TVA Sports
8	95th Academy Awards	3.636	Mar 12, 2023	CTV
9	Stanley Cup Playoffs - Round 2 - Game 1: Florida vs. Toronto	3.624	May 2, 2023	CBC, Sportsnet, TVA Sports
10	110th Grey Cup: Winnipeg vs. Montreal	3.59	Nov 19, 2023	TSN, RDS

=== 2022 ===
The following is a list of the most watched television broadcasts of 2022.

No.	Show	Viewership (in millions)	Date	Network(s)
1	Super Bowl LVI: Los Angeles Rams vs. Cincinnati	8.2	February 13, 2022	CTV, TSN, RDS
2	2022 FIFA World Cup Final: Argentina vs. France	4.8	December 18, 2022	CTV, TSN, RDS, Noovo
3	Bye Bye 2022	4.39	December 31, 2022	Ici Radio-Canada Télé
4	2022 FIFA World Cup Group Stage: Croatia vs. Canada	4.38	November 27, 2022	CTV, TSN, RDS
5	Stanley Cup Playoffs - Round 1 - Game 7: Tampa Bay vs. Toronto	4.1	May 14, 2022	CBC, Sportsnet, TVA Sports
6	2022 FIFA World Cup Group Stage: Belgium vs. Canada	3.73	November 23, 2022	CTV, TSN, RDS
7	Stanley Cup Playoffs - Round 1 - Game 6: Tampa Bay vs. Toronto	3.66	May 12, 2022	CBC, Sportsnet, TVA Sports
8	109th Grey Cup: Toronto vs. Winnipeg	3.35	November 20, 2022	TSN, RDS
9	94th Academy Awards	3.27	March 27, 2022	CTV
10	Infoman (New Years Eve special)	3.0	December 31, 2022	Ici Radio-Canada Télé

=== 2021 ===
The following is a list of the most watched television broadcasts of 2021.

No.	Show	Viewership (in millions)	Date	Network(s)
1	Super Bowl LV: Kansas City vs. Tampa Bay	8.9	February 7, 2021	CTV, TSN, RDS
2	Stanley Cup Playoffs - Round 1 - Game 7: Montreal vs. Toronto	7.4	May 31, 2021	CBC, Sportsnet, SN One, TVA Sports
3	Stanley Cup Playoffs - Round 1 - Game 6: Montreal vs. Toronto	7.3	May 29, 2021	CBC, Sportsnet, SN One, TVA Sports
4	Stanley Cup Final - Game 5: Montreal vs. Tampa Bay	6.5	July 7, 2021	CBC, Sportsnet, SN One, TVA Sports
5	Stanley Cup Final - Game 4: Montreal vs. Tampa Bay	6.0	July 5, 2021	CBC, Sportsnet, SN One, TVA Sports
6	Stanley Cup Final - Game 1: Montreal vs. Tampa Bay	5.8	June 28, 2021	CBC, Sportsnet, SN One, TVA Sports
7	Stanley Cup Playoffs - Round 3 - Game 6: Las Vegas vs. Montreal	5.4	June 24, 2021	CBC, Sportsnet, TVA Sports
8	Bye Bye 2021	5.2	December 31, 2021	Ici Radio-Canada Télé
9	Stanley Cup Final - Game 2: Montreal vs. Tampa Bay	4.7	June 30, 2021	CBC, Sportsnet, SN One, TVA Sports
10	Stanley Cup Playoffs - Round 1 - Game 1: Montreal vs. Toronto	4.5	May 20, 2021	CBC, Sportsnet, TVA Sports

=== 2020 ===
The following is a list of the most watched television broadcasts of 2020.

No.	Show	Viewership (in millions)	Date	Network(s)
1	Super Bowl LIV: San Francisco vs. Kansas City	9.6	February 2, 2020	CTV, TSN, RDS
2	Stronger Together, Tous Ensemble	5.9	April 26, 2020	CTV, Global, CBC, Citytv, V, CTV 2, OMNI, NTV, and 37 discretionary services
3	One World: Together at Home	5.1	April 18, 2020	CTV, Global, CBC, Citytv, CTV 2, and 7 discretionary services
4	Bye Bye 2020	4.9	December 31, 2020	Ici Radio-Canada Télé
5	92nd Academy Awards	4.8	February 9, 2020	CTV
6	2020 IIHF World Junior Championship Gold Medal Game: Canada vs. Russia	4.2	January 5, 2020	TSN, RDS
7	Infoman (New Years Eve special)	3.6	December 31, 2020	Ici Radio-Canada Télé
8	The Good Doctor ("I Love You") (season finale)	3.03	March 30, 2020	CTV
9	77th Golden Globe Awards	3.01	January 5, 2020	CTV
10	NBA Conference Semifinals - Game 7: Toronto vs Boston	2.7	September 11, 2020	TSN, RDS

=== 2019 ===
The following is a list of the most watched television broadcasts of 2019.

No.	Show	Viewership (in millions)	Date	Network(s)
1	NBA Finals - Game 6: Toronto vs. Golden State	7.9	June 13, 2019	TSN, CTV^{1}, RDS
2	NBA Finals - Game 5: Toronto vs. Golden State	6.4	June 10, 2019	Sportsnet, Citytv^{1}, RDS
3	The Big Bang Theory ("The Change Constant"/"The Stockholm Syndrome") (series finale)	5.8	May 16, 2019	CTV
4	Super Bowl LIII: New England vs. Los Angeles Rams	5.3 (Note: From 2017-2019, Bell Media's CTV was not permitted to perform simultaneous substitution for the Super Bowl as per a 2015 CRTC regulatory policy. Therefore, figures shown in these years only include viewership from Bell Media properties and do not include Canadian viewership of the American broadcast affiliates of Fox, NBC, or CBS, as US affiliate viewership is not included in CTV's average by Numeris. This process was overturned by the Supreme Court of Canada ahead of Super Bowl LIV in 2020.)	February 3, 2019	CTV, CTV2, TSN, RDS
5	91st Academy Awards	5.2	February 24, 2019	CTV
6	NBA Finals - Game 4: Toronto vs. Golden State	4.7	June 7, 2019	TSN, CTV 2, RDS
7	Bye Bye 2019	4.5	December 31, 2019	Ici Radio-Canada Télé
8	Stanley Cup Final - Game 7: St. Louis vs. Boston	4.2	June 12, 2019	CBC, Sportsnet, TVA Sports
9	NBA Finals - Game 3: Toronto vs. Golden State	4.0	June 5, 2019	Sportsnet, Citytv, RDS
10	107th Grey Cup: Hamilton vs. Winnipeg	3.9	November 24, 2019	TSN, RDS

^{1}CTV & Citytv simultaneously substituted ABC's coverage of the games, while TSN, Sportsnet, and RDS aired the Canadian produced broadcasts.

=== 2018 ===
The following is a list of the most watched television broadcasts of 2018.

No.	Show	Viewership (in millions)	Date	Network(s)
1	2018 Winter Olympics: Ice dance final	5.7	February 20, 2018	CBC consortium
2	Super Bowl LII: Philadelphia vs. New England	5.42	February 4, 2018	CTV, RDS
3	2018 Winter Olympics: Women's hockey gold medal game: Canada vs. United States	4.8	February 22, 2018	CBC consortium
4	Stanley Cup Playoffs - Round 1 - Game 7: Toronto vs. Boston	4.3	April 25, 2018	Sportsnet, CBC, TVA Sports
5	90th Academy Awards	4.73	March 4, 2018	CTV
6	Bye Bye 2018	4.5	December 31, 2018	Ici Radio-Canada Télé
7	2018 IIHF World Junior Championship Gold Medal Game: Sweden vs. Canada	4.2	January 5, 2018	TSN, RDS
8	The Big Bang Theory ("The Imitation Perturbation")	4.0	October 25, 2018	CTV
9	The Big Bang Theory ("The Bow Tie Asymmetry")	3.93	May 10, 2018	CTV
10	The Big Bang Theory ("The Solo Oscillation")	3.8	January 11, 2018	CTV

=== 2017 ===
The following is a list of the most watched television broadcasts of 2017.

No.	Show	Viewership (in millions)	Date	Network(s)
1	89th Academy Awards	5.80	February 26, 2017	CTV
2	Super Bowl LI: New England vs. Atlanta	5.5	February 5, 2017	CTV, CTV2, TSN, RDS
3	Stanley Cup Playoffs - Eastern Conference Final - Game 7: Ottawa vs. Pittsburgh	5.2	May 25, 2017	Sportsnet, CBC, TVA Sports
4	2017 IIHF World Junior Championship Gold Medal Game: Canada vs. USA	4.8	January 5, 2017	TSN, RDS
5	105th Grey Cup: Toronto vs. Calgary	4.3	November 26, 2017	TSN, RDS
6	Bye Bye 2017	4.1	December 31, 2017	Ici Radio-Canada Télé
7	The Big Bang Theory ("The Comic-Con Condundrum")	3.977	February 23, 2017	CTV
8	The Big Bang Theory ("The Holiday Summation")	3.976	January 5, 2017	CTV
9	Stanley Cup Playoffs - First Round - Game 2: Toronto vs. Washington	3.94	April 15, 2017	CBC, TVA Sports
10	The Big Bang Theory ("The Locomotion Reverberation")	3.9	February 9, 2017	CTV

=== 2016 ===
The following is a list of the most watched television broadcasts of 2016.

No.	Show	Viewership (in millions)	Date	Network(s)
1	Super Bowl 50: Carolina vs. Denver	8.3	February 7, 2016	CTV, RDS
2	2016 Summer Olympics: Men's 100 metres final	6.9	August 14, 2016	CBC consortium, Ici Radio-Canada Télé
3	88th Academy Awards	5.7	February 28, 2016	CTV
4	2016 American League Division Series: Game 3 - Toronto vs. Texas	5.0	October 9, 2016	Sportsnet, TVAS
5	The Big Bang Theory ("The Sales Call Sublimation")	4.6	January 7, 2016	CTV
6	The Big Bang Theory ("The Empathy Optimization")	4.5	January 14, 2016	CTV
7	The Big Bang Theory ("The Meemaw Materialization")	4.4	February 4, 2016	CTV
8	The Tragically Hip: A National Celebration (farewell concert)	4.3	August 20, 2016	CBC
9	The Big Bang Theory ("The Valentino Submergence")	4.27	February 11, 2016	CTV
10	The Big Bang Theory ("The Celebration Experimentation")	4.26	February 25, 2016	CTV

=== 2015 ===
The following is a list of the ten most watched television broadcasts of 2015.

No.	Show	Viewership (in millions)	Date	Network(s)
1	Super Bowl XLIX: New England vs. Seattle	9.2	February 1, 2015	CTV, RDS
2	2015 IIHF World Junior Championship gold medal game: Canada vs. Russia	7.0	January 5, 2015	TSN, RDS
3	87th Academy Awards	5.5	February 22, 2015	CTV
4	2015 American League Championship Series: Game 6 - Toronto vs. Kansas City	5.3	October 23, 2015	Sportsnet, RDS2, RDS^{1}
5	2015 American League Division Series: Game 5 - Toronto vs. Texas	5.3	October 14, 2015	Sportsnet, RDS
6	The Big Bang Theory ("The Opening Night Excitation")	5.1	December 17, 2015	CTV
7	The Big Bang Theory ("The Colonization Application")	4.5	March 5, 2015	CTV
8	2015 American League Division Series: Game 4 - Toronto vs. Texas	4.45	October 12, 2015	Sportsnet, RDS
9	The Big Bang Theory ("The Anxiety Optimization")	4.36	January 29, 2015	CTV
10	103rd Grey Cup: Ottawa vs. Edmonton	4.29	November 29, 2015	TSN, RDS

^{1}RDS joined the broadcast in-progress at 9:45 PM.

=== 2014 ===
The following is a list of the ten most watched television broadcasts of 2014.

No.	Show	Viewership (in millions)	Date	Network(s)
1	2014 Winter Olympics: Men's hockey - gold medal game: Canada vs. Sweden	8.5	February 23, 2014	CBC consortium, Ici Radio-Canada Télé
2	Super Bowl XLVIII: Seattle vs. Denver	7.9	February 2, 2014	CTV, RDS
3	Stanley Cup Playoffs - Second Round - Game 7: Montreal vs. Boston	7.2	May 14, 2014	CBC, RDS
4	86th Academy Awards	6.4	March 2, 2014	CTV
5	Stanley Cup Eastern Conference Final - Game 6: Montreal vs. New York Rangers	6.2	May 29, 2014	CBC, RDS
6	Stanley Cup Eastern Conference Final - Game 4: Montreal vs. New York Rangers	6.1	May 25, 2014	CBC, RDS
7	Stanley Cup Playoffs - Second Round - Game 6: Montreal vs. Boston	6.04	May 12, 2014	CBC, RDS
8	Stanley Cup Eastern Conference Final - Game 5: Montreal vs. New York Rangers	6.0	May 27, 2014	CBC, RDS
9	2014 FIFA World Cup final - Germany vs. Argentina	5.8	July 13, 2014	CBC, Ici Radio-Canada Télé
10	Stanley Cup Eastern Conference Final - Game 3: Montreal vs. New York Rangers	5.5	May 22, 2014	CBC, RDS

=== 2013 ===
The following is a list of the ten most watched television broadcasts of 2013.

No.	Show	Viewership (in millions)	Date	Network(s)
1	Super Bowl XLVII Baltimore vs. San Francisco	7.3	February 3, 2013	CTV, RDS
2	85th Academy Awards	6.3	February 24, 2013	CTV
3	Stanley Cup round 1 - Game 7: Toronto vs. Boston	5.7	May 13, 2013	CBC, RDS
4	The Big Bang Theory ("The Deception Verification")	5.3	September 26, 2013	CTV
5	The Big Bang Theory ("The Hofstadter Insufficiency")	5.1	September 26, 2013	CTV
6	Stanley Cup round 1 - Game 6: Toronto vs. Boston	4.89	May 12, 2013	CBC, RDS
7	The Big Bang Theory ("The Bakersfield Expedition")	4.85	January 10, 2013	CTV
8	101st Grey Cup: Hamilton vs. Saskatchewan	4.5	November 24, 2013	TSN, RDS
9	The Big Bang Theory ("The Thanksgiving Decoupling")	4.72	November 21, 2013	CTV
10	The Big Bang Theory ("The Egg Salad Equivalency")	4.69	January 3, 2013	CTV

=== 2012 ===
The following is a list of the ten most watched television broadcasts of 2012.

No.	Show	Viewership (in millions)	Date	Network(s)
1	Super Bowl XLVI: New York Giants vs. New England	8.2	February 5, 2012	CTV, RDS
2	2012 Summer Olympics closing ceremony	7.5	August 12, 2012	Canada's Olympic Broadcast Media Consortium
3	84th Academy Awards	6.5	February 26, 2012	CTV
4	2012 Summer Olympics opening ceremony	6.4	July 27, 2012	Canada's Olympic Broadcast Media Consortium
5	2012 Summer Olympics: Men's 100 metres final	6.2	August 5, 2012	Canada's Olympic Broadcast Media Consortium
6	100th Grey Cup: Calgary vs. Toronto	5.8	November 25, 2012	TSN, RDS
7	The Big Bang Theory ("The Re-Entry Minimization")	5.3	October 18, 2012	CTV
8	54th Annual Grammy Awards	4.95	February 12, 2012	Global
9	The Big Bang Theory ("The Holographic Excitation")	4.90	October 25, 2012	CTV
10	The Big Bang Theory ("The Extract Obliteration")	4.87	November 1, 2012	CTV

=== 2011 ===
The following is a list of the ten most watched television broadcasts of 2011.

No.	Show	Viewership (in millions)	Date	Network(s)
1	Stanley Cup Final – Game 7: Boston vs. Vancouver	9.7	June 15, 2011	CBC, RDS
2	Stanley Cup Final – Game 6: Boston vs. Vancouver	7.5	June 13, 2011	CBC, RDS
3	Super Bowl XLV: Pittsburgh vs. Green Bay	7.3	February 6, 2011	CTV, RDS
4	Stanley Cup Final – Game 5: Boston vs. Vancouver	6.8	June 10, 2011	CBC, RDS
5	2011 IIHF World Junior Championship Gold Medal Game Russia vs. Canada	6.7	January 5, 2011	TSN, RDS
6	Stanley Cup Final – Game 2: Boston vs. Vancouver	6.3	June 4, 2011	CBC, RDS
7	83rd Academy Awards	6.28	February 27, 2011	CTV
8	Stanley Cup Final – Game 1: Boston vs. Vancouver	6.24	June 1, 2011	CBC, RDS
9	Stanley Cup Final – Game 3: Boston vs. Vancouver	6.1	June 6, 2011	CBC, RDS
10	Stanley Cup Final – Game 4: Boston vs. Vancouver	5.8	June 8, 2011	CBC, RDS

=== 2010 ===
The Canadian city of Vancouver hosted the 2010 Winter Olympics, which was highly watched among Canadians on the participating networks of Canada's Olympic Broadcast Media Consortium. The consortium was formed specifically for the 2010 and 2012 Olympic Games, with primary coverage appearing on CTV and V, in English and French respectively. Many of the top broadcasts in Canadian history occurred during these Olympics, as such the top broadcasts from 2010 are broken down into three lists: overall, Olympics, and non-Olympics.

==== Top 10 most watched television broadcasts of 2010 ====
No.	Show	Viewership (in millions)	Date	Network(s)
1	Vancouver 2010: Men's hockey – Canada vs. USA gold medal game	16.67	February 28, 2010	Canada's Olympic Broadcast Media Consortium
2	Vancouver 2010: Closing Ceremony	14.44	February 28, 2010	Canada's Olympic Broadcast Media Consortium
3	Vancouver 2010: Opening Ceremony	13.50	February 12, 2010	Canada's Olympic Broadcast Media Consortium
4	Vancouver 2010: Men's hockey – Canada vs. USA preliminary round game	10.68	February 21, 2010	Canada's Olympic Broadcast Media Consortium
5	Vancouver 2010: Men's hockey – Canada vs. Russia quarterfinal game	10.56	February 24, 2010	Canada's Olympic Broadcast Media Consortium
6	Vancouver 2010: Men's hockey – Canada vs. Slovakia semifinal game	9.87	February 26, 2010	Canada's Olympic Broadcast Media Consortium
7	Vancouver 2010: Women's hockey – Canada vs. USA gold medal game	7.50	February 25, 2010	Canada's Olympic Broadcast Media Consortium
8	Vancouver 2010: Men's hockey – Canada vs. Germany qualification playoff game	7.43	February 23, 2010	Canada's Olympic Broadcast Media Consortium
9	Vancouver 2010: Short track speed skating – Men's 1000 metres finals	7.23	February 20, 2010	Canada's Olympic Broadcast Media Consortium
10	Super Bowl XLIV: New Orleans vs. Indianapolis	6.92	February 7, 2010	CTV, RDS

==== Top 10 most watched television broadcasts of the 2010 Winter Olympics ====
No.	Show	Viewership (in millions)	Date	Network(s)
1	Men's hockey – Canada vs. USA gold medal game	16.67	February 28, 2010	Canada's Olympic Broadcast Media Consortium
2	Closing Ceremony	14.44	February 28, 2010	Canada's Olympic Broadcast Media Consortium
3	Opening Ceremony	13.50	February 12, 2010	Canada's Olympic Broadcast Media Consortium
4	Men's hockey – Canada vs. USA preliminary round game	10.68	February 21, 2010	Canada's Olympic Broadcast Media Consortium
5	Men's hockey – Canada vs. Russia quarterfinal game	10.56	February 24, 2010	Canada's Olympic Broadcast Media Consortium
6	Men's hockey – Canada vs. Slovakia semifinal game	9.87	February 26, 2010	Canada's Olympic Broadcast Media Consortium
7	Women's hockey – Canada vs. USA gold medal game	7.50	February 25, 2010	Canada's Olympic Broadcast Media Consortium
8	Men's hockey – Canada vs. Germany qualification playoff game	7.43	February 23, 2010	Canada's Olympic Broadcast Media Consortium
9	Short track speed skating – Men's 1000 metres finals	7.23	February 20, 2010	Canada's Olympic Broadcast Media Consortium
10	Men's hockey – Canada vs. Switzerland preliminary round game	6.89	February 18, 2010	Canada's Olympic Broadcast Media Consortium

==== Top 10 most watched television broadcasts of 2010, excluding broadcasts from the 2010 Winter Olympics ====
No.	Show	Viewership (in millions)	Date	Network(s)
1	Super Bowl XLIV: New Orleans vs. Indianapolis	6.92	February 7, 2010	CTV, RDS
2	Stanley Cup round 2 – Game 7: Montreal vs. Pittsburgh	6.90	May 12, 2010	CBC, RDS
3	82nd Academy Awards	6.2	March 7, 2010	CTV
4	98th Grey Cup: Montreal vs. Saskatchewan	6.2	November 28, 2010	TSN, RDS
5	2010 IIHF World Junior Championship Gold Medal Game: Canada vs. USA	5.8	January 5, 2010	TSN, RDS
6	2010 FIFA World Cup Final: Netherlands vs. Spain	5.5	July 11, 2010	CBC, Ici Radio-Canada Télé
7	Stanley Cup round 2 – Game 6: Montreal vs. Pittsburgh	5.1	May 10, 2010	CBC, RDS
8	Stanley Cup Final – Game 6: Chicago vs. Philadelphia	5.1	June 9, 2010	CBC, RDS
9	Stanley Cup round 3 – Game 3: Montreal vs. Philadelphia	4.9	May 10, 2010	CBC, RDS
10	Stanley Cup round 1 – Game 7: Washington vs. Montreal	4.9	May 10, 2010	TSN, RDS
