= Bye Bye (TV series) =

Annual New Year's Eve television sketch comedy special in Quebec, Canada

- Genre: Comedy
- Country of origin: Canada
- Original language: French

Production
- Running time: 1980 (25 min); 2000 (50 min); 2010 (75 minutes)
- Production company: A Media

Original release
- Network: Ici Radio-Canada Télé
- Release: 1968 – present

Bye Bye is a Canadian sketch comedy special, broadcast annually by Ici Radio-Canada Télé on New Year's Eve. The yearly program features sketches satirizing the past year's events, followed by a countdown to the next year itself. Originally beginning in 1968, Bye Bye '98 was the final edition of its first run, until the show was revived by other artists including the comedy troupe Rock et Belles Oreilles, who produced the 2006 and 2007 editions of the show.

In 2008, it was announced that Véronique Cloutier and Louis Morissette would take over the program for its 2008 edition. However, this edition provoked controversy over certain sketches that viewers found to be derogatory and racist; such as a sketch about the assassination of then-American president-elect Barack Obama, and a sketch making fun of anglophones. The network received 1,300 complaints from viewers about the content in the special, which led to Cloutier making a public apology stating that the sketches were supposed to criticize racism rather than promote it.

As a result of the controversy, a 2009 edition was not produced, but despite the controversy surrounding their edition, Cloutier and Morissette announced that they would return to produce a 2010 edition of Bye Bye.

In 2018, the special began to achieve record viewership, with that year's edition overtaking an episode of La Petite Vie as the highest-rated Quebecois television program of all-time—with 4.471 million viewers. In 2020, due to restrictions on gatherings due to the COVID-19 pandemic in Quebec, Bye Bye 2020 (which featured several sketches lampooning the provincial and federal government's responses) achieved a record 3.8 million live viewers—a 93% market share. The 2021 special—which included a cameo appearance by recently fired Montreal Canadiens manager Marc Bergevin in a parody of Uber Eats' commercials—once again broke records due to strict COVID-19 restrictions. With 4.862 million viewers, it was reported to be the highest-rated Quebecois television program of all-time (and in turn, among the top television broadcasts nationwide of 2021). The only other program among the top five is the aforementioned La Petite Vie.

== See also ==
- List of Quebec television series
- Culture of Quebec
- Royal Canadian Air Farce, who presented a similar comedy special for CBC Television
- This Hour Has 22 Minutes, another similar comedy special for CBC Television
- Scotch and Wry, a similar Scottish series
