= Voyage de nuit =

- Directed by: Roger Frappier
- Written by: Roger Frappier; Claude Meunier; Louis Saia
- Produced by: Roger Frappier; Carole Mondello
- Starring: Serge Thériault; Johanne Fontaine; Markita Boies
- Cinematography: Guy Dufaux
- Edited by: François Gill
- Music by: Yves Laferrière
- Production company: Cinémax
- Release date: 1981
- Running time: 27 minutes
- Country: Canada
- Language: French

Voyage de nuit is a Canadian comedy short film, directed by Roger Frappier and released in 1981. The film stars Serge Thériault and Johanne Fontaine as a man and a woman who meet and spend the night doing drugs and having sex.

The cast also includes Markita Boies, Jean Mathieu and Jérôme Thiberghien.

The film was a Genie Award nominee for Best Theatrical Short Film at the 3rd Genie Awards in 1982.
