= Les Boys =

- Home video cover art
- Directed by: Louis Saia
- Written by: Christian Fournier; Louis Saïa
- Produced by: Richard Goudreau; Jeffrey Tinnell
- Starring: Marc Messier; Rémy Girard; Patrick Huard; Serge Thériault
- Cinematography: Sylvain Brault
- Edited by: Yvann Thibaudeau
- Music by: Normand Corbeil
- Distributed by: CFP International
- Release date: 1997
- Running time: 107 minutes
- Country: Canada
- Language: French
- Budget: CAD$3 million
- Box office: $10.6 million

Les Boys is a 1997 Quebec-made comedy film directed by Louis Saia. It has spawned three sequels and by any measure (profit, box office or attendance) is the most successful Quebec made film series of all time, and one of the most successful Canadian-made film series of all time.

== Plot ==
The story follows the players on a hockey team ("Les Boys") that play in a low level amateur hockey league. They are made up of a wide variety of professions and personalities, including a police officer, a barely competent doctor, a mechanic, an unemployed hockey trivia buff who has lost his confidence as a goaltender, a shifty real estate salesman and a closeted gay lawyer. The team is sponsored by a pub owner, whose son desperately wants to play hockey with the older men. The film starts at the time of the league championship, at which time the team is soundly thrashed in the final.

Meanwhile, the pub owner is losing at poker to the head of the local organized crime syndicate, to the tune of $50,000. Given the opportunity to pay him back, the owner can only raise $25,000. After threatening to break his leg, the crime boss proposes another wager - a game between Les Boys and his own team. If Les Boys win, the debt is settled, but if they lose, the crime boss gets the pub.

In the week leading up to the big game, a number of sub plots emerge. Chief among them is the fact that most of the partners of the hockey players are starved for affection and intimacy, including the effeminate partner of the gay lawyer. Their primary complaint is that their men are either consumed by work or hockey to the exclusion of their relationships. Meanwhile, the doctor is attempting to get the pub's attractive waitress to notice him, but she only has eyes for the team's best player, the hunky, but married, mechanic.

When game day arrives, the waitress has waylaid the mechanic on the pretext that her car needs work. The rest of the players arrive (including the goalie, who had previously vowed retirement) to find they are up against a lineup of ringers, including players they recognize from various minor leagues. Bewildered by the competition and handicapped by the lack of their best player, they quickly fall behind until the pub owner finally discloses the wager, and the mechanic shows up when he learns from his teammates that his wife is looking for him at the rink. Naturally, they overcome all obstacles and triumph. The gay lawyer is publicly outed when he joyfully reunites with his lover. The waitress, seeing the doctor without his cheap toupee, realizes she is attracted to him after all.

== English translation of title ==
Translating "Les Boys" to English poses obvious difficulties as the word "Boys" is borrowed directly from English. As with most examples of English words borrowed into Quebec French, it is treated grammatically as a French noun, and given the proper plural, definite article. Literally, the title could be translated as "The 'Boys'", and this is the title used for English versions on videotape or DVD.

== Film as part of Quebec culture ==
Surprisingly, this is one of very few Quebec made feature films to deal with ice hockey, a near obsession for many in Quebec since the beginning of the 20th century. Outsiders often underestimate the importance of hockey to Canadian culture, and particularly to Quebec culture. A film about aging immature men pursuing their sport on a serious amateur level is not a new one (see The Longest Yard, Mystery, Alaska, etc.), but it struck a responsive chord with Quebec audiences, many of whom obviously saw a piece of themselves in the characters.

== Box office success ==
Les Boys cost about $3,300,000 (CAD) to make, and took in domestic box office of over $6,000,000 CAD and another $4,000,000 USD in the United States. Given the size of the Québec market (the film saw limited release in English Canada), a $6 million box office is the approximate equivalent of over $250 million for a domestic U.S. release, assuming a population ratio of about 1:40. Its three sequels were also the best performing films at the Québec box office in the years they were released.

== Reception ==
French audiences generally enjoy the film far more than English audiences. This is no doubt partially because most English versions of the film have a badly dubbed dialogue, whereas the French dialogue is far more realistic.

== Sequels ==
Due to the success of the movie at the Quebec box office, Louis Saïa directed two additional sequels, Les Boys II and Les Boys III. The third sequel, Les Boys IV, was directed by George Mihalka.

The second movie is about the team playing in a tournament in Chamonix, France. During the movie, the team's equipment is stolen in Chamonix. They manage to get their equipment back and to win the tournament in a shootout. Daniel Russo join the cast of the movie. It grossed $6 million in the United States and Canada, including $3.8 million in Canada.

The third one is more complex, as Stan's team members are demoted to a team managed by one of Stan's friends. During a matchup between the remaining Boys members and former Boys members, it is revealed that Stan's friend wants to use land around Stan's bar to build condos. The former Boys turn against their new team and Stan takes over his friend's bar. In this movie, the Boys play a game against the Canada women's Olympic team consisting mainly of players from Quebec (Kim St-Pierre, Caroline Ouellette, Danielle Goyette, Gina Kingsbury and others). The Boys are easily defeated by the girls.

The fourth movie is again a tournament in which the Boys' team ends up in a game against the French Legends Team (les Légendes du Hockey). Some of the legends in the movie include Guy Lafleur, Mike Bossy, Ray Bourque and Martin Brodeur. Also during the movie, after a bad game, Stan takes his Boys into a wooded location and nearly gets them lost in the area.

== Television series ==
A spin-off TV series titled Les Boys: La série debuted on October 1, 2007 on Télévision de Radio-Canada. Most of the regulars have returned to reprise their original roles, including Rémy Girard, Marc Messier, Paul Houde, Michel Charette, Yvan Ponton, Patrick Labbé and Pierre Lebeau.

A second season debuted in January 2009. Pierre Verville and Patrice Belanger joined Les Boys as new players. Paul Houde will not be back as the Boys goalie Fernand Rivest, as he is killed off in the season premiere.

The show ran a total of 5 seasons and ended its run in 2012.

== Prequel ==
There was also the prequel to the saga called il était une fois les Boys released in 2013.

== See also ==
- List of films about ice hockey
