= Honey, I'm in Love =

2008 film

- French: Le Grand départ
- Directed by: Claude Meunier
- Written by: Claude Meunier
- Produced by: Daniel Louis; Denise Robert
- Starring: Marc Messier; Guylaine Tremblay; Hélène Bourgeois Leclerc
- Cinematography: Bruce Chun
- Edited by: Jean-François Bergeron
- Music by: Michel Corriveau
- Production company: Cinémaginaire
- Distributed by: Alliance Vivafilm
- Release date: October 18, 2008 (CIFF)
- Running time: 100 minutes
- Country: Canada
- Language: French

Honey, I'm in Love (French: Le Grand départ) is a Canadian comedy-drama film, directed by Claude Meunier and released in 2008. The film stars Marc Messier as Jean-Paul Cardin, a successful surgeon who, following the breakup of his marriage to Céline Demers (Guylaine Tremblay), must juggle his commitments to his children and his new relationship with younger artist Nathalie (Hélène Bourgeois Leclerc).

The film's cast also includes Patrick Drolet and Sophie Desmarais as Jean-Paul's children Guylain and Myriam, as well as Rémy Girard, Louis-José Houde, Catherine Trudeau and Cynthia Wu-Maheux in supporting roles.

Meunier wrote the screenplay in part based on his own experience following the breakdown of his first marriage.

The film premiered at the Chicago International Film Festival in October 2008, before opening commercially in December.

The film received two Jutra Award nominations at the 11th Jutra Awards in 2009, for Best Actress (Tremblay) and Best Sound (Patrick Rousseau, Marie-Claude Gagne, Louis Gignac).
