= Radio Enfer =

Quebec television series

- Created by: François Jobin; Louis Saia
- Country of origin: Canada
- Original language: French
- No. of seasons: 6
- No. of episodes: 143

Production
- Producers: Claudio Luca; Pierre Olivier
- Running time: 30 min.
- Production company: Ciné Télé Action Inc.

Original release
- Network: Canal Famille / Vrak.TV
- Release: September 7, 1995 – March 28, 2001

Radio Enfer (French for Hell Radio) is a Québécois sitcom broadcast on Canal Famille and its later incarnation, Vrak.TV, about a group of students at an unidentified high school managing their own high school radio station.

Radio Enfer had a total of 143 episodes and six seasons dating from 1995 to 2001.

== Cast and characters ==
=== Main cast ===
- François Chénier: Carl "Le Cat" Charest (student radio music director)
- Robin Aubert: Léo Rivard (technical director)
- Rachel Fontaine: Maria Lopez (finance director)
- Anne-Claude Chénier: Camille Bergeron (content director)
- Michel Charette: Jean-Lou "Le Hot-Dog" Duval (radio staffer)
- Vincent Magnat: Germain St-Germain (radio staffer)
- Guillaume Lemay-Thivierge: Jean-David Vézina (radio staffer)
- Joël Marin: Vincent Gélinas (editor in chief of the school newspaper and staffer at the radio station) (season 3)
- Isabelle Drainville: Dominique Vachon (newspaper staffer)
- Micheline Bernard: Jocelyne Letendre (school psychologist, also in charge of the school's extracurricular activities) (season 2)
- Pierre Claveau: Rodolphe Giroux (principal)
- Alexis Martin: Firmin Laplante (head of mathematics department)
- Bruno Blanchet: Gontrand Galgouri (head of science department)

=== Supporting cast ===
- Serge Thériault: André Dufresne (head of history department)
- Luc Bourgeois: Hervé Duguay (head of history department)
- Sylvie Potvin: Madame Champoux (school cook)
- Jean-Nicolas Verreault: Fred (student)
- Sylvie Choquette: Élisabeth Trave (student and bassist in a band with Carl, Mr. Giroux and Jean-Lou)
- Chantal Francke: Carole Péloquin (inspector for the Ministry of Education)
- Louis-Georges Girard: Monsieur Charest (Carl's father and owner of the bowling alley)
- Sophie Faucher: Lucienne Pitzikini (Owner of the boutique Chic Madame)
- Richard Lalancette: Gilbert (Jocelyne's husband)
- Jean-François Baril: Carol Giroux (Mr. Giroux's nephew)

== Broadcast history ==
Radio Enfer was seen in first-run on Canal Famille from September 1995 to January 2001, and on the rebranded Vrak.TV from January to March 2001; it was also seen on Ontario's francophone broadcaster TFO from 1995 to 1996.

Repeats of the series continued on Vrak.TV through 2004. Reruns returned to the channel in August 2009, and was broadcast since then. Currently, Prise 2 airs re-runs of the series.

Unis TV aired all 6 seasons starting September 8, 2017.

== Home video releases ==
All six seasons of Radio Enfer were released on DVD in season sets between November 2006 and October 2010.

Three VHS tapes were also released in the late-1990s, each featuring three random episodes of the series.

== See also ==
- Radio Active (TV series) -- YTV series based on Radio Enfer
