= Marc Messier =

Canadian actor (1947–2026)

Marc Messier OC MSC
- Born: August 16, 1947; Granby, Quebec, Canada
- Died: July 7, 2026 (aged 78); Quebec, Canada
- Occupations: Actor; writer
- Years active: 1972–2026

Marc Messier, OC MSC (August 16, 1947 – July 7, 2026) was a Canadian actor.

== Life and career ==
Messier was born in Granby, Quebec on August 16, 1947.

After finishing his studies and developed his acting skills in college, he played in various theatrical shows across the province of Quebec plays including "Broue". It was in 1972, that he debuted his acting career in La Vie Rêvée and would make his first appearance in a television series in 1974 in Avec le temps.

Messier's most extensive role was in the two-decade old television series Lance et Compte in which he played the role of Marc Gagnon, a hockey player for the fictional National Hockey League team, the Quebec National. After his retirement as a player, Gagnon went on to coach the team on during the second and again fourth seasons of the series, Lance et Compte: Nouvelle Generation. Messier played the role of Gagnon for six seasons starting in 1986, and finally in 2015 in Lance et Compte: La finale.

Messier also played the role of Bob in all four chapters of the popular Quebec film Les Boys, the story of a hockey team from a senior's league.

He also played roles in other important films such as Jesus of Montreal and Le Sphinx, and television series such as Les Voisins, La Petite Vie, Omertà and Urgence.

In addition to playing a role in the film Le Sphinx, which was released in 1995, he had also co-wrote it with Les Boys producer Louis Saia. Messier played in several other films that were produced by Saia during the course of his lengthy career.

Messier died on July 7, 2026, at the age of 78.

== Awards ==
Messier's most productive year was in 1988 in which he won two Gemini Awards for Best Lead Male Role and Best Male Supporting Role for his participation in Lance et Compte and Les Voisins. His role in Les Boys also earned him nominations for Best Male Actor at the Jutra Awards in 1999 and 2002.

Messier was awarded the Meritorious Service Cross with the Canada Day honours list of 2017. The citation reads "Having earned a Guinness World Record in 2006 for the longest-running theatrical play with the same cast, Michel Côté, Marcel Gauthier and Marc Messier are undisputed ambassadors of Quebec theatre. With over 3,300 performances of Broue, a one-of-a-kind play reflecting Quebec popular culture, they have made us laugh and have introduced an entire generation to the wonderful world of theatre."

He was appointed to the Order of Canada in June 2023 with the rank of Officer.

== Selected filmography ==
=== Film ===
Year	Film	Role	Notes
1986	Sonia	Psychiatrist	
1989	Looking for Eternity (Portion d'éternité)	Pierre Lemieux	
1989	Jesus of Montreal	John Lambert	
1994	The Wind from Wyoming (Le Vent du Wyoming)	Marcel	
1995	The Sphinx (Le Sphinx)	Réal Prescott	
2001	On Your Head (Le Ciel sur la tête)	Gaby	
2007	Bluff	Patrice	
2008	Honey, I'm in Love (Le Grand départ)	Jean-Paul Cardin	
2009	The Master Key (Grande Ourse, la clé des possibles)	Louis-Bernard	
2021	The Time Thief (L'Arracheuse de temps)		
2023	My Mother's Men (Les Hommes de ma mère)	Jacques-Antoine	
2026	L'Autre		

=== Television ===
Year	Film	Role	Notes
1986	Lance et Compte	Marc Gagnon	
1987	Les voisins	Bernard	
1997	Omertà	Paul Spencer	
1997	Les Boys	Bob	
2019	La Faille	Jules Ricard	
