= La Petite Vie =

1993 Canadian TV sitcom

- Created by: Claude Meunier
- Directed by: Pierre Seguin
- Country of origin: Canada
- Original language: French
- No. of episodes: 59

Production
- Running time: 23 minutes

Original release
- Network: Radio-Canada
- Release: 1993 – 1999

La petite vie is first a stage sketch of the comedy duo Ding et Dong, formed by Claude Meunier and Serge Thériault, and later a hit Quebec television sitcom aired by Radio-Canada from 1993 to 1999. In total, 59 episodes were created plus 3 specials, two for Christmas and one for New Year's 2000.

Widely considered a classic of the Quebec television, it was the first Canadian TV show (of either English or French language) to ever gather more than 4 million viewers, a performance it achieved twice in 1995 (since surpassed by Bye Bye 2018 with 4.41 million).

A new 6-episode series was aired in early 2024 featuring nearly all the main actors except Serge Thériault, who made a cameo appearance at the end of the final episode.

== Synopsis ==
The stories of La petite vie, sketch and television show, revolve around the strange couple simply known as Pôpa and Môman (Quebec Joual for pa and ma). The sketch was memorable for the pillow talk scenes with the beds comically placed straight up so the actors, seemingly laid on the bed but still standing (a pun with the French saying «histoire à dormir debout» "story to sleep standing-up", a story that doesn't make sense), would be clearly visible to the theater public. This would be kept in the sitcom, where the context made it even more surreal.

While the sketch usually featured only the couple, the sitcom introduced a vast array of relatives. This created bizarre caricatures of a Québécois working class family.

== Characters ==
=== Paré family ===
- Aimé "Ti-Mé" Paré (Claude Meunier)
- Jacqueline "Moman" Paré (Serge Thériault)
- Réjean Pinard (Marc Messier)
- Thérèse Paré (Diane Lavallée)
- Rénald "Pinson" Paré (Marc Labrèche)
- Lison "Creton" Paré (Josée Deschênes)
- Caro Paré (Guylaine Tremblay)
- Rodrigue "Rod" Paré (Bernard Fortin)
- Stimé (Stéphane Rousseau)

=== Friends ===
- Paul "Pogo" Gauthier (Rémy Girard)
- Linda Gaudette (Sylvie Potvin)
- Jean-Lou (Michel Côté)
- Bobby (Gilles Renaud)
- Agathe "Bobonne" (Véronique Le Flaguais)
- Momo (Benoît Brière)
- Paul & Pogo Junior (François P. Forcier)

=== Noël Story ===
- Animé Guy Jodoin
- Mélodie Valérie Blais

== See also ==
- List of Quebec television series
- Television of Quebec
- Culture of Quebec
