= Claude Meunier =

Canadian actor and film director

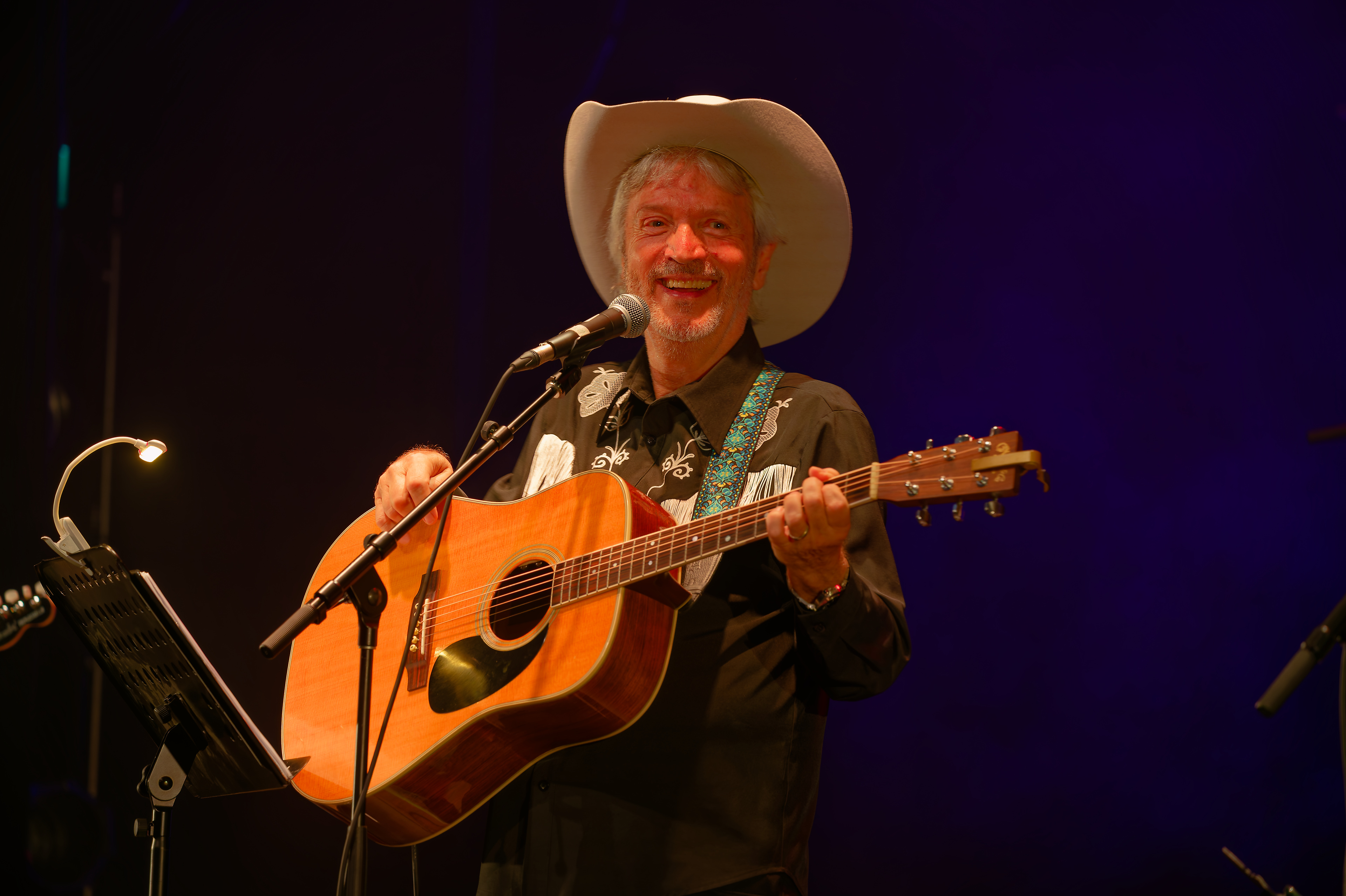
- Gilbert Rozon and Claude Meunier at Théâtre Saint-Denis at the Just for Laughs festival in 2010.
- Born: September 4, 1951 (age 74); Montreal, Quebec, Canada
- Occupations: Actor, dramaturge, comedian and film director.
- Years active: 1976-present
- Notable work: La Fricassée, Bye Bye 76, Bonne année Roger

Claude Meunier OC (born September 4, 1951) is a Canadian actor, dramaturge, comedian and film director.

Meunier was born September 4, 1951 in Montreal, Quebec and studied law at the Université de Montréal.

== Career ==
=== Writer ===
He was the co-writer of two successful plays: Broue and Appelez-moi, Stéphane (1978), and Les Voisins (1979). and was the creator of Canadian sitcom television series La Petite Vie.

=== Actor ===
He has starred in La Petite Vie for 30 years, from 1993 to 2023. Other credits include Bye Bye (TV series) Les Lundis des Ha! Ha!, Ding et Dong, Détect.inc., La petite séduction.

== Filmography ==
=== Author ===
==== Television ====
- 1976 - La Fricassée
- 1976 - Bye Bye 76
- 1981 - Bonne année Roger
- 1982 - Le Bye Bye
- 1983 - Les Lundis des Ha! Ha!
- 1987 - Les Voisins
- 1992 - Le monde merveilleux de Ding et Dong
- 1993 to 1998 - La Petite Vie
- 1999 - La Petite Vie : Le Bogue de l'an 2000
- 2002 - La Petite Vie : Noël chez les Paré
- 2005 - Détect.inc.
- 2009 - La Petite Vie : Noël Story
- 2012 - Adam & Ève (TV series)

==== Cinema ====
- 1981 - Voyage de nuit
- 1990 - Ding et Dong, le film d'Alain Chartrand
- 2008 - Honey, I'm in Love (Le Grand Départ) de Claude Meunier

=== Actor ===
==== Television ====
- 1981 - Bonne année Roger : multiple roles
- 1982 - Le Bye Bye : multiple roles
- 1983 - Les Lundis des Ha! Ha! : Dong
- 1992 - Le monde merveilleux de Ding et Dong : Dong
- 1993 to 1998 - La Petite Vie : Aimé (or « Ti-Mé ») Popa Paré
- 1995 - Bye Bye 95 : multiple roles
- 1999 - La Petite Vie : Le Bogue de l'an 2000 : Aimé (ou « Ti-Mé ») Popa Paré
- 2002 - La Petite Vie : Noël chez les Paré : Aimé (ou « Ti-Mé ») Popa Paré
- 2005 - Détect.inc. : Bob Marlow
- 2009 - La Petite Vie : Noël Story : Aimé (ou « Ti-Mé ») Popa Paré
- 2011 - La petite séduction : invited artist (visit of Sainte-Flore in Shawinigan)

==== Cinema ====
- 1990 - Ding et Dong, le film d'Alain Chartrand : Dong
- 2008 - Honey, I'm in Love (Le Grand Départ) de Claude Meunier : le voisin senteux

=== Film director ===
==== Cinéma ====
- 2008 - Honey, I'm in Love (Le Grand Départ)

== Theatre (author) ==
- 1974 - Les Nerfs à l'air
- 1979 - Broue
- 1981 - Appelez-moi Stéphane
- 1982 - Les Voisins
- 1982 - Monogamy
- 2003 - Les Noces de tôle

== Bibliography ==
- 1982 - Les Voisins, Leméac
- 1998 - Le Monde de La Petite Vie, Leméac
- 2000 - Journal d'un Ti-Mé : propos et réflexions, Leméac
- 2003 - Les Noces de tôle, Leméac
- 2009 - La bande à Ti-Paul, Glénat Québec (comic book)
- 2011 - Les aventures de Fonck et Ponck : Les Voyageurs du Graal de Luca Jalbert, Cabro* Productions (comic book) (cameo of characters from the La Petite Vie television series)
