= Jack Armstrong (basketball) =

American sportscaster (born 1963)

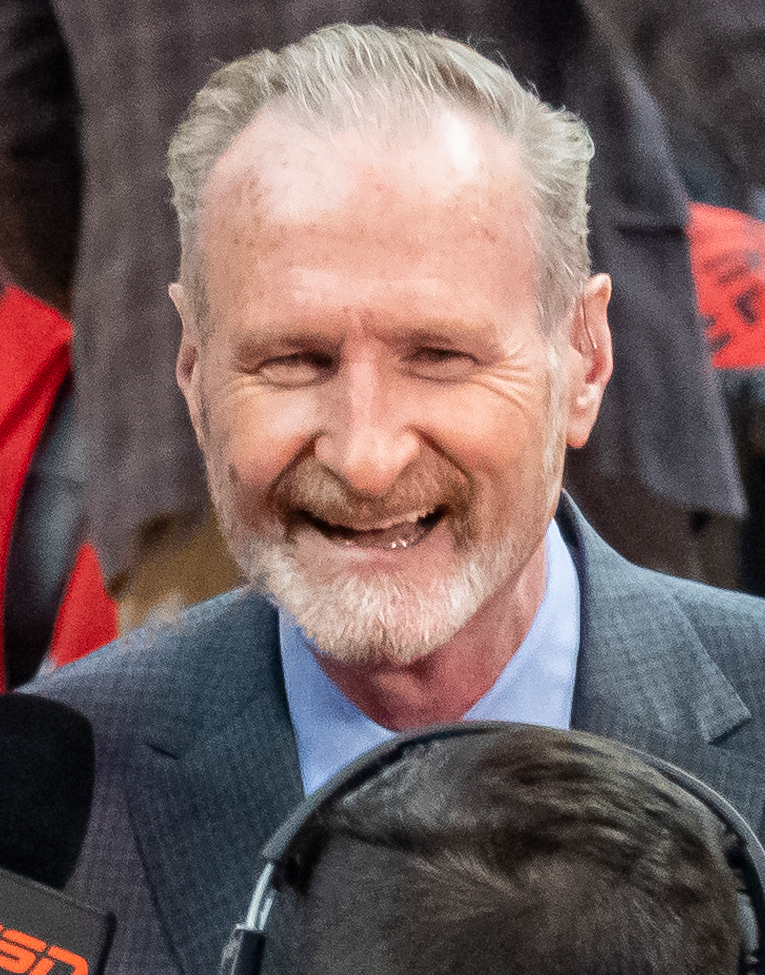
- Armstrong at Game 2 of the 2019 NBA Finals
- Born: John Joseph Armstrong; January 3, 1963 (age 63); Brooklyn, New York, U.S.
- Education: Fordham University
- Occupation: Sportscaster
- Employer(s): Bell Media, MLSE
- Spouse: Dena Armstrong
- Children: Brian Armstrong, Kevin Armstrong, Tim Armstrong

John Joseph Armstrong (born January 3, 1963) is an American sportscaster, working primarily for the Toronto Raptors on TSN and NBA TV Canada. Armstrong is also the college basketball analyst for TSN and a former college basketball coach.

== Personal ==
Armstrong is the son of Irish immigrants and was raised Catholic. His father, who was from Castlebar, County Mayo, died when Jack was age seven and his mother Mary raised him alone. Armstrong graduated from Fordham University in 1988 with a master's in Communication. He has three brothers: William, James and Brendan.

Jack is married to Dena Armstrong, who was the women's soccer coach at Niagara University. They met at Niagara University, when they were both coaches. They are the parents of three adopted sons. They live in Lewiston, New York just across the Niagara River from Ontario.

Armstrong is a fan of the Buffalo Bills, Buffalo Sabres, New York Yankees and the Toronto Raptors.

== Coaching career ==
From 1989 to 1998, Armstrong was the lead basketball coach of Niagara University. In the 1992–93 season, he led the Niagara Purple Eagles to a 23–7 record and was named the New York State Division I Coach of the Year. His overall record with the team was 100–154.

== Broadcast career ==
Armstrong is currently an NBA analyst for TSN and the on-air in-game broadcaster for the Toronto Raptors NBA team. He has been a part of the broadcast team since 1998. Armstrong has two catch-phrases that he uses during game broadcasts: "Helloooo" and "Get that garbage outta here". The "get that garbage outta here" phrase was also used by Armstrong in commercials for the City of Toronto government to encourage keeping garbage out of recycling materials. Most recently, following the Raptors’ signings of Montreal natives Chris Boucher and Khem Birch, he would use “Bonjour” instead of "Helloooo" whenever a big play such as a block or dunk would be made by those players.

Armstrong is a 3-time winner of the Canadian Screen Award for Best Sports Analyst in a Sports Program or Series.

On Thursday, July 31, 2008, it was announced that Jack Armstrong would take over The Chuck Swirsky Show effective August 18, 2008, alongside Doug MacLean on the Toronto, Ontario AM sports talk radio station The Fan 590. The show's name was later changed to The Game Plan. In 2009, Doug MacLean left the show and was replaced by Eric Smith.
