= Ding et Dong =

- Directed by: Alain Chartrand
- Written by: Claude Meunier
- Produced by: Roger Frappier; Pierre Gendron
- Starring: Claude Meunier; Serge Thériault
- Cinematography: Karol Ike
- Edited by: François Gill
- Music by: Jean-Marie Benoît; Yves Lapierre
- Production company: Max Films
- Distributed by: Cineplex Odeon
- Release date: September 5, 1990
- Running time: 96 minutes
- Country: Canada
- Language: French

Ding et Dong was a Canadian comedy duo from Quebec, consisting of Serge Thériault as "Ding" and Claude Meunier as "Dong". They are most noted for their eponymous 1990 comedy film, which was based on their prior stage show.

In the film, Ding and Dong are aspiring comedians, who begin performing door-to-door comedy shows but find their collaboration threatened when a wealthy dying man names them as the heirs in his will, leaving them $30 million toward the creation of their own theatre company and thus sparking creative disagreements between the two as to their future direction. The film's cast also includes Raymond Bouchard, Jean Lapointe, Yves Pelletier, Linda Sorgini, Jean-Pierre Bergeron and Anne Dorval.

At the 12th Genie Awards, the film won the Golden Reel Award as the top-grossing Canadian film of the year.
