= Numeris =

Canadian audience measurement organization

Numeris (formerly the Bureau of Broadcast Measurement, or BBM Canada) is a Canadian audience measurement organization. Established on May 11, 1944 as a division of the Canadian Association of Broadcasters, Numeris is the sole provider of viewership numbers for television and radio broadcasters in Canada.

== History ==
Numeris was founded by the Canadian Association of Broadcasters on May 11, 1944 as the Bureau of Broadcast Measurement.

In 1964, it became the first ratings service in the world to introduce computerized sample selection. In 2004, the organization began a joint venture with Nielsen Media Research to adopt its Portable People Meter system for television audience measurement.

The organization officially shortened its name to BBM Canada in 2001; despite this, many outlets still referred to the organization under its previous name. In late December 2011, BBM sued Canadian technology company Research in Motion for trademark infringement, as it uses the "BBM" acronym to refer to its BlackBerry Messenger service. The organization alleged that it had received phone calls from users who believed that they were affiliated with RIM. RIM objected to the lawsuit, arguing that both companies were in unrelated industries. The suit was dismissed in 2012 by Canadian federal courts as being without merit. BBM Canada ultimately chose to adopt a different name.

On June 19, 2014, BBM Canada re-branded as Numeris, unveiling a new logo designed by the agency Cundari, along with a new slogan, "Audiences Count". The company felt that the BBM name, especially given the continued use of its full name by media outlets, evoked visions of "surveys and bureaucracy" that were inconsistent with its modern operation.

On August 28, 2022, Numeris ceased publication of TV Topline Reports.

== Radio ==
In radio, Numeris is the main provider of ratings services. The company has traditionally used a diary-based system for tracking radio audience habits and this system is still used in most markets. In Montreal, Toronto, Vancouver, Edmonton and Calgary ratings are now measured using the Portable People Meter (PPM) technology.

== Television ==
In television, Numeris is partnered with the American company Nielsen in a joint venture which measures the Toronto, Vancouver, Calgary, Edmonton, Montreal Anglo and Montreal Franco markets, the Ontario region and national ratings figures via Portable People Meters.

== See also ==
- List of most watched television broadcasts in Canada
- List of most-watched television broadcasts
