= Jordi Fernández =

Spanish basketball coach (born 1982)

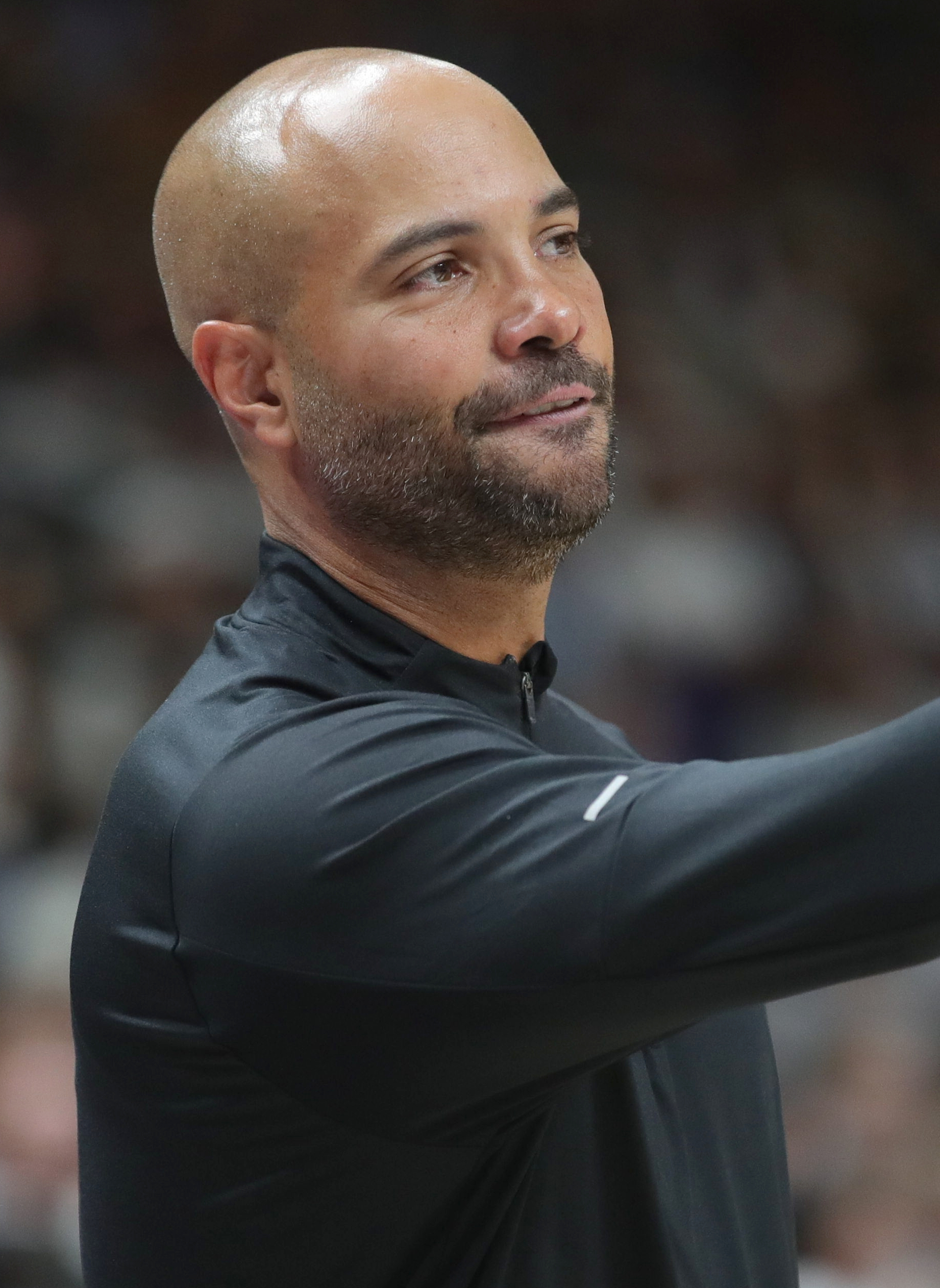
- Fernández in 2023

Brooklyn Nets
- Position: Head coach
- League: NBA

Personal information
- Born: December 27, 1982 (age 43) Badalona, Spain

Career information
- College: University of Barcelona; Hogeschool van Amsterdam
- Coaching career: 2006–present

Career history

Coaching
- 2006–2009: Impact Basketball Academy (players development)
- 2009–2013: Cleveland Cavaliers (player development)
- 2013–2014: Canton Charge (assistant)
- 2014–2016: Canton Charge
- 2016–2022: Denver Nuggets (assistant)
- 2022–2024: Sacramento Kings (associate HC)
- 2024–present: Brooklyn Nets
- 2023–2024: Canada
Medals
Men's basketball
Head Coach for Canada
FIBA World Cup
Bronze medal – third place	2023 Philippines–Japan–Indonesia

Jordi Fernández Torres (born December 27, 1982) is a Spanish professional basketball coach who is the head coach for the Brooklyn Nets of the National Basketball Association (NBA).

== Coaching career ==
In his native Spain, Fernández started his coaching career at age 15, working in the youth setup of clubs like CB Sant Josep de Badalona and CB Sant Boi. At Club Bàsquet l'Hospitalet he also served as athletic trainer of the LEB Plata side. He spent some time abroad, coaching in Norway and the Netherlands and attended a summer camp at the University of Oklahoma.

In the summer of 2006, Fernández moved to Las Vegas, where he joined the coaching staff of the Impact Basketball Academy.

=== Cleveland Cavaliers (2009–2013) ===
Fernández began his National Basketball Association (NBA) coaching career in 2009 when Mike Brown, then head coach of the Cleveland Cavaliers, hired Fernández to be a player development coach with the team. There, he tutored Kyrie Irving, Tristan Thompson, Dion Waiters, Matthew Dellavedova and other players. Mike Gansey, the Cavaliers assistant general manager, spoke highly of Fernández during his tenure with the Cavaliers: "Whoever walks through that door, [Fernández] can relate to them... he's either watched it, lived it or seen it. That's why he's so valuable." Fernández also worked with LeBron James and Shaquille O'Neal during his time with the Cavaliers. He was also on the coaching staff during the Cavaliers' 2016 NBA Championship.

=== Canton Charge (2013–2016) ===
In 2013, Fernández took an opportunity to join the Canton Charge in the NBA Development League as the top assistant coach. One year later he became the head coach.

=== Denver Nuggets (2016–2022) ===
To start the 2016–17 season, the Denver Nuggets added Fernández to their coaching staff as an assistant coach.

Fernández was referenced in ESPN's annual report on potential coaching candidates to watch in April 2018. Players on the Nuggets’ roster spoke highly of Fernández. Monté Morris said, "He's an all about business guy."

=== Sacramento Kings (2022–2024) ===
On August 12, 2022, Fernández was hired as the associate head coach of the Sacramento Kings. After being hired as associate head coach, Fernández served as the head coach of the Kings' Summer League team in 2022. He helped the fourth overall pick in the 2022 NBA draft, Keegan Murray, win the 2022 Summer League MVP award. On December 14, 2022, Fernández took over as acting head coach after the Kings' head coach, Mike Brown, was ejected mid-game. He assumed the same role for back-to-back games against the Denver Nuggets on December 27 and 28, with Brown entering health and safety protocols. Before the game on December 27, Nuggets' head coach, Michael Malone, whom Fernández worked under in his previous coaching stop, said, "I think one day Jordi will be a head coach in this league. He's been a head coach in the G League. He's got great international experience. This team is on the right path with the right coaches, so I'm really happy for them."

=== Brooklyn Nets (2024–present) ===
On April 22, 2024, Fernández was hired as the head coach of the Brooklyn Nets. Fernández is the first Spanish head coach in NBA history, and only the third to be born, raised, and trained outside North America, after Igor Kokoškov and Darko Rajaković.

On April 20, 2026, Fernández and the Nets agreed to a multi-year contract extension.

== National team career ==
In 2013, Fernández served as an assistant coach for Spain's U19 men's national team. From 2017 until 2019, he worked as an assistant coach on the Spanish men's national team.

Fernández was an assistant coach for the Nigeria national team under Mike Brown at the 2020 Summer Olympics in Tokyo, Japan. The two had first met when Fernández worked at the Impact Basketball Academy.

On June 27, 2023, Fernández replaced Nick Nurse as the head coach of Team Canada's men's basketball team. On February 6, 2025, Fernandez left his position as head coach of the senior national team of Canada.

== Education ==
Fernandez's background in academia provides him with a unique perspective on coaching. His college degree is in sports sciences, and is one completed academic article away from his PhD in sports psychology. He has extensively studied and researched the observation of human behavior. In 2009, Fernandez co-authored an academic article titled Identifying and analyzing the construction and effectiveness of offensive plays in basketball by using systematic observation.

== Head coaching record ==
=== NBA ===
Legend
Regular season	G	Games coached	W	Games won	L	Games lost	W–L %	Win–loss %
Playoffs	PG	Playoff games	PW	Playoff wins	PL	Playoff losses	PW–L %	Playoff win–loss %

Team	Year	G	W	L	W–L%	Finish	PG	PW	PL	PW–L%	Result
Brooklyn	2024–25	82	26	56	.317	4th in Atlantic	—	—	—	—	Missed playoffs
Brooklyn	2025–26	82	20	62	.244	5th in Atlantic	—	—	—	—	Missed playoffs
Career		164	46	118	.280		—	—	—	—	

=== NBA D-League ===
Legend
Regular season	G	Games coached	W	Games won	L	Games lost	W–L %	Win–loss %
Playoffs	PG	Playoff games	PW	Playoff wins	PL	Playoff losses	PW–L %	Playoff win–loss %

Team	Year	G	W	L	W–L%	Finish	PG	PW	PL	PW–L%	Result
Canton	2014–15	50	31	19	.620	2nd in East	5	2	3	.400	Lost in semifinals
Canton	2015–16	50	31	19	.620	2nd in Central	4	2	2	.500	Lost in semifinals
Career		100	62	38	.620		9	4	5	.444	

=== International ===
National team head coaching record
Team	Year	G	W	L	W–L%	Tournament	TG	TW	TL	PW–L%	Result
Canada	2023	13	9	4	.692	World Cup	8	6	2	.750	Won bronze medal
Canada	2024	7	5	2	.714	Olympics	4	3	1	.750	5th place
Career		20	14	6	.700		12	9	3	.750	

== Awards and honours ==
- 2023: Bronze medal winner at the FIBA World Cup (as a head coach of Canada men's national team)

== See also ==
- List of foreign NBA coaches
