= Jama Mahlalela =

Swazi-Canadian basketball coach (born 1980)

- Mahlalela in 2023

Toronto Raptors
- Position: Assistant coach
- League: NBA

Personal information
- Born: April 24, 1980 (age 46) Mbabane, Swaziland
- Listed height: 6 ft 3 in (1.91 m)

Career information
- College: UBC (1999–2004)
- Coaching career: 2004–present

Career history

Coaching
- 2004–2008: University of Toronto (assistant)
- 2013–2018: Toronto Raptors (assistant)
- 2018–2020: Raptors 905
- 2020–2021: Toronto Raptors (assistant)
- 2021–2023: Golden State Warriors (assistant)
- 2023–present: Toronto Raptors (assistant)

Career highlights
- As player: Canada West champion (2003); As assistant coach: NBA champion (2022)

Jama George Mahlalela (born April 24, 1980) is a Swazi-Canadian basketball coach, currently an assistant coach for the Toronto Raptors of the National Basketball Association (NBA). Previously he has served as the head coach of Raptors 905 of the NBA G League and an assistant coach for the Golden State Warriors.

== Career ==
=== University of British Columbia ===
Mahlalela played basketball for the UBC Thunderbirds. He played for five years, served as a team captain, and helped the team win a Canada West title in 2003. Mahlalela graduated in 2004 with a Bachelor of Kinesiology degree from UBC and the Jama Mahlalela Award was created in his honour.

=== Toronto Raptors (2013–2021) ===
Mahlalela started with the Toronto Raptors in 2006 as a member of the community development staff, leading the Raptors Basketball Academy and various clinics throughout Canada. He was named director of basketball operations for NBA Asia in 2009 and oversaw the League's clinics, youth programs and elite-level development from his base in Hong Kong. Mahlalela began his tenure as an assistant coach in the 2013–14 NBA season.

On June 19, 2018, Mahlalela was named as the new head coach for the Raptors' affiliated Raptors 905 of the NBA G League.

On December 4, 2020, it was announced that Mahlalela had rejoined the Toronto Raptors coaching staff as an assistant behind head coach Nick Nurse.

=== Golden State Warriors (2021–2023) ===
On August 13, 2021, the Golden State Warriors hired Mahlalela as an assistant coach and director of player development. In Mahlalela's first season, the Warriors won the 2022 NBA Finals against the Boston Celtics in 6 games.

=== Toronto Raptors (2023–present) ===
On June 15, 2023, it was announced Mahlalela would return to the Toronto Raptors as one of Darko Rajaković's top assistant coaches.

== Personal life ==
Mahlalela ran many youth basketball organizations while he was with the Raptors. He has also worked for NBA Cares.

== See also ==
- List of foreign NBA coaches
