= List of Toronto Raptors head coaches =

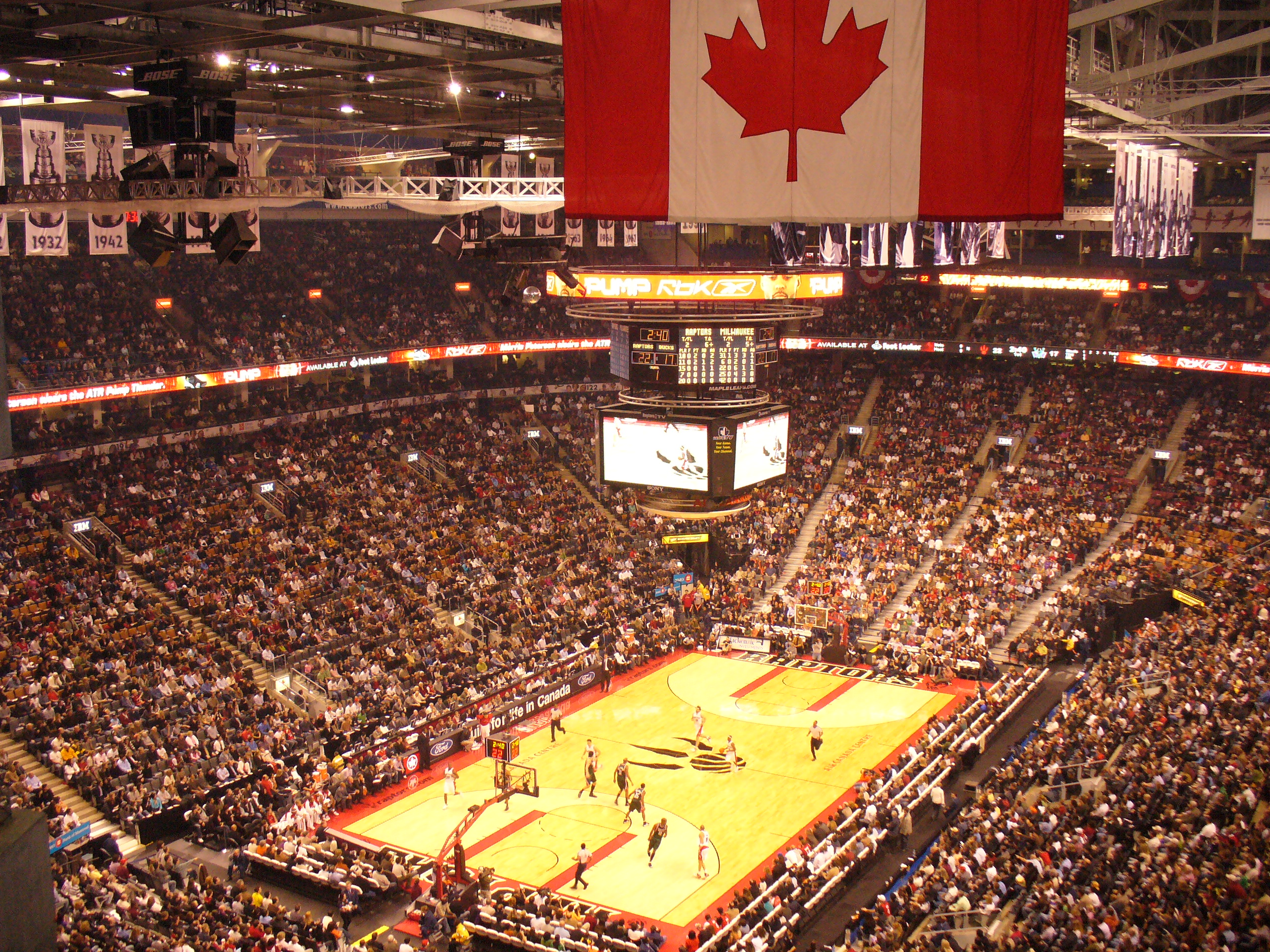
The Toronto Raptors have played their home games at Scotiabank Arena (formerly the Air Canada Centre) since 1999.

The Toronto Raptors are a Canadian professional basketball team based in Toronto, Ontario. They play in the Atlantic Division of the Eastern Conference in the National Basketball Association (NBA). The Raptors are the only Canadian-based NBA team. The team joined the NBA in 1995 as an expansion team with the Vancouver Grizzlies (which relocated to Memphis, Tennessee in 2001). The Raptors first played their home games at the SkyDome (now known as the Rogers Centre), before moving to Scotiabank Arena (formerly the Air Canada Centre) in 1999, where they have played since. The Raptors are owned by Maple Leaf Sports & Entertainment and Bobby Webster is their general manager.

There have been ten head coaches for the Raptors franchise. The franchise's first head coach was Brendan Malone, who coached for one season. Dwane Casey is the franchise's all-time leader for the most regular-season games coached (397) and the most regular-season game wins (210). Casey is the franchise's all-time leader for the most playoff games coached (51), as well as the most playoff-game wins (21).

Lenny Wilkens is the only Raptors coach to have been elected into the Basketball Hall of Fame as a coach.

Sam Mitchell, Dwane Casey and Nick Nurse are the only Raptors coaches to have won the NBA Coach of the Year Award, having won it in the 2006–07 season, 2017–18 season, and 2019–20 season respectively.

Butch Carter and Kevin O'Neill have spent their entire NBA head coaching careers with the Raptors. Jay Triano was the interim head coach of the Raptors since Mitchell was fired. Triano is the first Canadian head coach in NBA history.

Nick Nurse is the only Raptors coach to have won an NBA Championship with the team (2018–19 NBA season) and holds the franchise's highest winning percentage in the regular season (.707) and playoffs (.667).

== Key ==
GC	Games coached
W	Wins
L	Losses
Win%	Winning percentage
#	Number of coaches^{[a]}
*	Spent entire NBA head coaching career with the Raptors
†	Elected into the Basketball Hall of Fame as a coach

== Coaches ==
Note: Statistics are correct through the end of the 2025–26 season.

#	Name	Term^{[b]}	GC	W	L	Win%	GC	W	L	Win%	Achievements	Reference
#	Name	Term^{[b]}	Regular season				Playoffs				Achievements	Reference
1	Brendan Malone	1995–1996	82	21	61	.256	—	—	—	—		
2	Darrell Walker	1996–1997	131	41	90	.313	—	—	—	—		
3	Butch Carter*	1997–2000	165	73	92	.442	3	0	3	.000		
4	Lenny Wilkens†	2000–2003	246	113	133	.459	17	8	9	.471	One of the top 10 coaches in NBA history	
5	Kevin O'Neill*	2003–2004	82	33	49	.402	—	—	—	—		
6	Sam Mitchell	2004–2008	345	156	189	.452	11	3	8	.273	2006–07 NBA Coach of the Year	
7	Jay Triano	2009–2011	229	87	142	.380	—	—	—			
8	Dwane Casey	2011–2018	558	320	238	.573	51	21	30	.412	2017–18 NBA Coach of the Year	
9	Nick Nurse	2018–2023	390	227	163	.582	41	25	16	.610	NBA champion (2019); 2019–20 NBA Coach of the Year	
10	Darko Rajaković	2023–present	246	101	145	.411						

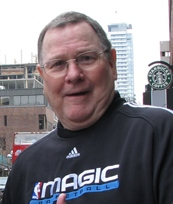
Brendan Malone was the first head coach of the Raptors from 1995 to 1996.

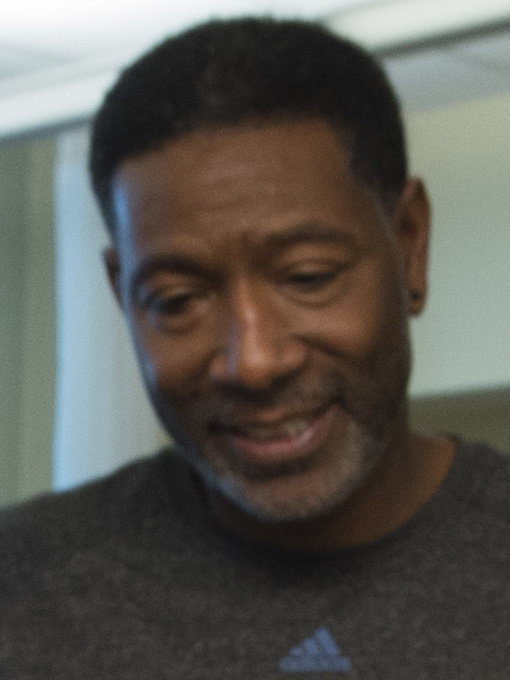
Sam Mitchell was the head coach for the Raptors from 2004 to 2008.

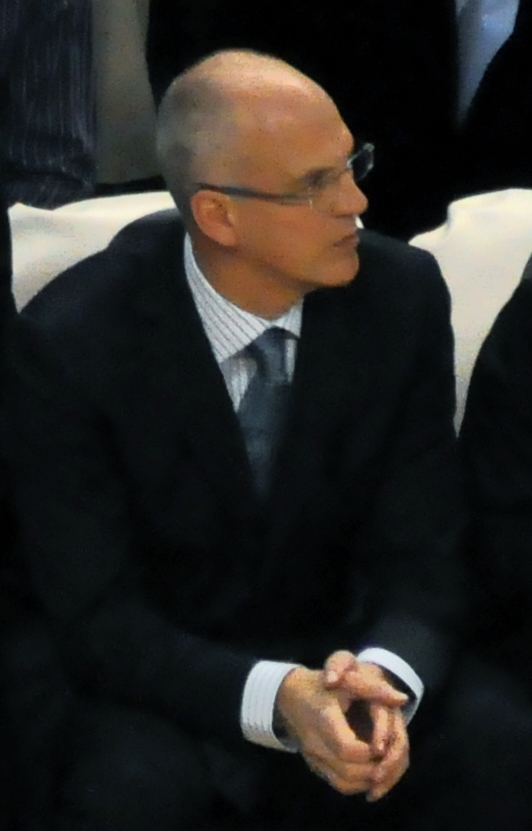
Jay Triano was the head coach from 2009 to 2011.

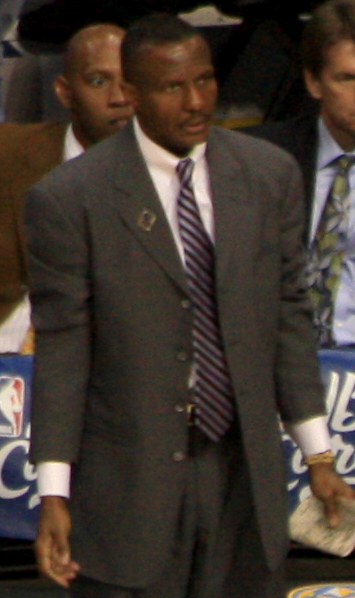
Dwane Casey was the longest-serving head coach from 2011 to 2018.

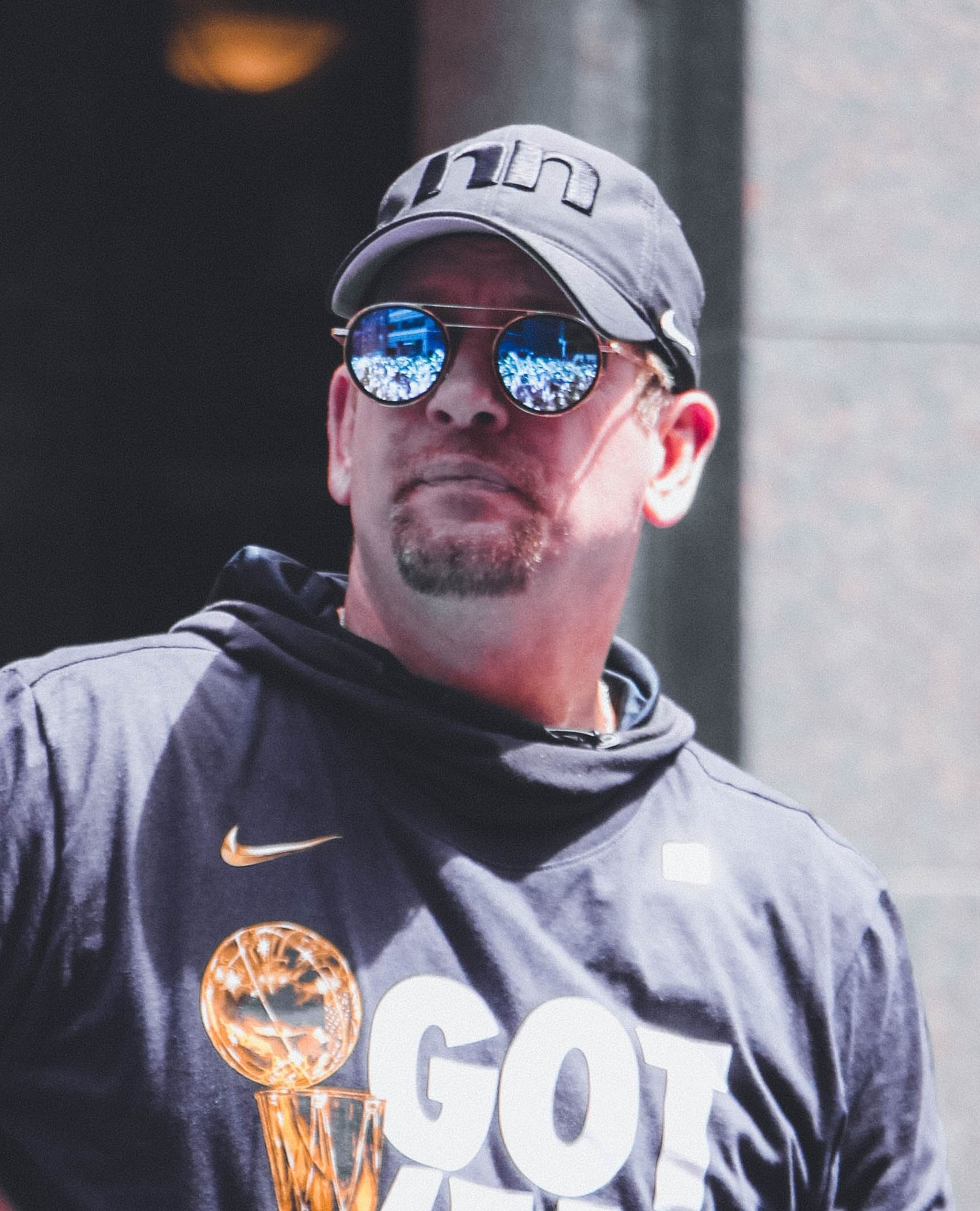
Nick Nurse was the coach of the Raptors from 2018 to 2023. The Raptors won the 2019 NBA Finals under his tenure.

== Notes ==
- ^{a} A running total of the number of coaches of the Raptors. Thus, any coach who has two or more separate terms as head coach is only counted once.
- ^{b} Each year is linked to an article about that particular NBA season.
