= Ivo Simović =

Serbian basketball coach (born 1979)

Toronto Raptors
- Position: Assistant coach
- League: NBA

Personal information
- Born: January 5, 1979 (age 47) Gornji Milanovac, SFR Yugoslavia
- Coaching career: 2001–present

Career history

Coaching
- 2001–2007: Crvena zvezda (youth)
- 2015–2017: Hartford (assistant)
- 2017–2018: Charlotte (assistant)
- 2018–2022: Loyola (Maryland) (assistant)
- 2022–2023: UCLA (assistant)
- 2023–present: Toronto Raptors (assistant)

Career highlights
- As assistant coach: Pac-12 regular season (2023)

Ivo Simović (Serbian Cyrillic: Иво Симовић; born January 5, 1979) is a Serbian professional basketball coach who is an assistant coach for the Toronto Raptors of the National Basketball Association (NBA).

== Coaching career ==
Simović began his coaching career in 2001 with the Crvena zvezda youth system in Belgrade. During his time at the Zvezda, they won the 2004 National Championship and were runner-up in his final season in 2007.

Simović spent two summers working as an assistant coach with the San Antonio Spurs during 2013 NBA Summer League and 2014 NBA Summer League season. He earned an NBA Championship ring from the team after the Spurs won the 2014 title.

=== NCAA assistant coach (2015–2023) ===
Simović joined the Hartford Hawks coaching staff prior to the 2015–16 season as an assistant coach. He was promoted to associate head coach in November 2016.

On June 5, 2017, Simović was named an assistant coach for the Charlotte 49ers of the Conference USA.

On June 10, 2022, Simović was named an assistant coach for UCLA Bruins of the Pac-12 Conference, under head coach Mick Cronin, for the 2022–23 season.

=== NBA assistant coach (2023–present) ===
In June 2023, Simović was named assistant coach of the Toronto Raptors, under Darko Rajaković.

== Executive career ==
Simović served as the sports director for CB Espacio Torrelodones of the Spanish EBA League (level 4) from 2007 to 2015, where he landed some of the top players in Madrid throughout his time there. They were the runner-up in the Primera Division – Community of Madrid Group during the 2011–12 season and were the fifth-best program in all of Spain in his final season. The club showed tremendous technical growth under Simović, and he mentored such coaches as Darko Rajaković.

== Personal life ==
Simović and his wife, Jelena, have two children, Ema and Marko.

== See also ==
- List of Serbian NBA coaches
- List of foreign NBA coaches
