= Alex McKechnie =

Scottish-Canadian physiotherapist

Toronto Raptors
- Positions: Vice President, Player Health and Performance
- League: NBA

Personal information
- Born: c. 1952 Glasgow, Scotland
- Coaching career: 2013–present

Career history

Coaching
- 2000–2011: Los Angeles Lakers (athletic)
- 2013–2020: Toronto Raptors (assistant)

Career highlights
- 6× NBA champion (2000–2002, 2009, 2010, 2019)

Alex McKechnie (born in Glasgow, Scotland) is a Scottish-Canadian physiotherapist who works as the Vice President, Player Health and Performance for the Toronto Raptors of the National Basketball Association. He was inducted into the British Columbia Sports Hall of Fame in 2018.

== Early life ==
McKechnie was born in Glasgow, Scotland. He earned his bachelor's degree in physiotherapy from the Leeds School of Physiotherapy in Leeds, England.

== Professional career ==
McKechnie started his career as a head physiotherapist for Simon Fraser University in 1974. The Vancouver Whitecaps brought him on board in 1988. Over the next few decades, McKechnie continued to work with the Whitecaps and 86ers, as well as the Vancouver Canucks and the Canada men's national soccer team. He was a staff member of the Canadian soccer team that won the gold medal at the 2000 CONCACAF Gold Cup in the United States. At the same time, McKechnie operated his own private sports medicine practice in Burnaby and helped thousands of everyday athletes.

Retired American tennis legend Jimmy Connors regularly used McKechnie's services during his career in the 1970s and 1980s. Also, McKechnie worked with a Canadian Hall of Famer Steve Nash and a former English footballer Owen Hargreaves.

McKechnie worked with Shaquille O'Neal in the late 1990s. In 2000, the Los Angeles Lakers made McKechnie a full-time member of their staff and he earned five NBA championship rings in 11 seasons. McKechnie joined the Toronto Raptors in the 2011–12 NBA season as a director of sports science. McKechnie won his 6th championship when the Raptors defeated the Golden State Warriors in 6 games of the 2019 NBA Finals.

== See also ==
- List of foreign NBA coaches
