= 2023 NBA G League expansion draft =

General information
- Sport: Basketball
- Date(s): June 8, 2023
- Location: New York, New York

Overview
- League: NBA
- Expansion teams: Rip City Remix

The 2023 NBA G League expansion draft was the 13th expansion draft of the NBA G League. The draft was held on June 8, 2023, so that the newly founded Rip City Remix could acquire players for the upcoming 2023–24 season. The 14 players were chosen from a pool of unprotected players among the league's teams. Each returning G-League team could protect up to 12 of their players from being selected.

== Key ==
Pos.	G	F	C
Position	Guard	Forward	Center

†	Denotes player who was also selected in an NBA Draft

== Draft ==
Pick	Player	Pos.	Nationality	Team	College
1	Chudier Bile	F	South Sudan	Rip City Remix	Georgetown
2	Michael Devoe	G	United States	Rip City Remix	Georgia Tech
3	Jawun Evans	G	United States	Rip City Remix	Oklahoma State
4	Deng Geu	F/C	Uganda	Rip City Remix	North Texas
5	Kyle Guy	G	United States	Rip City Remix	Virginia
6	Justin Jackson	F	United States	Rip City Remix	Maryland
7	Matt Mooney	G	United States	Rip City Remix	Texas Tech
8	EJ Onu	F/C	United States	Rip City Remix	Shawnee State
9	Elijah Pemberton	G	United States	Rip City Remix	Hofstra
10	Quinton Rose	G/F	United States	Rip City Remix	Temple Owls
11	Aamir Simms	F	United States	Rip City Remix	Clemson
12	Jeremiah Tilmon	C	United States	Rip City Remix	Missouri
13	Romeo Weems	F	United States	Rip City Remix	DePaul
14	Donovan Williams	G	United States	Rip City Remix	UNLV
