= Sergi Oliva =

Spanish basketball coach (born 1984)

Atlanta Hawks
- Position: Assistant coach
- League: NBA

Personal information
- Born: 1984 (age 41–42) Gelida, Barcelona, Spain
- Coaching career: 2020–present

Career history

Coaching
- 2020–2022: Utah Jazz (assistant)
- 2024–2026: Rip City Remix
- 2026–present: Atlanta Hawks (assistant)

Sergi Oliva (Catalan: [ˈsɛɾʒi uˈliβə], Spanish: [ˈseɾxi oˈliβa]; born 1984) is a Spanish professional basketball executive and coach who currently serves as an assistant coach for the Atlanta Hawks of the National Basketball Association (NBA).

== Education ==
Oliva had earned multiple degrees from Polytechnic University of Catalonia, including a PhD in computational complexity in 2013 and both master's and bachelor's degrees in computer science. As a researcher, Oliva worked at Polytechnic University of Catalonia between 2007 and 2013.

== Executive career ==
Oliva joined the Philadelphia 76ers in 2014 as a basketball operations analyst. Through years he got multiple promotions, most recently as vice president of strategy in 2019. He parted ways with the 76ers in October 2020.

On 9 June 2022, Oliva was named an assistant general manager for the Portland Trail Blazers.

== Coaching career ==
While in Catalonia, Oliva spent 12 years as a head coach at the youth level at Club Esportiu Gelida and at the senior level at Club Bàsquet Hortonenc.

On 16 October 2020, Oliva was named an assistant coach for the Utah Jazz under Quin Snyder. In March 2022, The Athletic named him to their 40 under 40 list for NBA executives, coaches and agents shaping the future of the basketball world.

On 27 August 2024, Oliva was named head coach of the Rip City Remix.

On 16 September 2026, Oliva was hired as an assistant coach for the Atlanta Hawks under head coach Quin Snyder.

== See also ==
- List of foreign NBA coaches
