= Michelle F. Mottola =

Canadian anatomist and exercise physiologist

- Born: September 1, 1955 (age 71); Niagara Falls, Ontario, Canada
- Spouse: Gordon Marchiori (m. 1984)

Academic background
- Education: BSc, physical education, University of Western Ontario; MSc, 1980, PhD, Anatomy, 1984, University of Alberta
- Thesis: Effects of Three Intensities of Maternal Exercise on the Material Rat and Development of the Fetuses (1984)

Academic work
- Institutions: University of Western Ontario; University of Alberta
- Main interests: exercise and pregnancy

Michelle Frances Mottola FCAHS (born September 1, 1955) is a Canadian anatomist and exercise physiologist. She is a Distinguished University Professor at University of Western Ontario.

== Early life and education ==
Mottola was born on September 1, 1955 in Niagara Falls, Ontario, Canada, to parents Stephanie and Guy Mottola. Growing up, she attended St. Gabriel Lalemant Catholic Elementary School, Georges P. Vanier Senior Elementary School, and A. N. Myer Secondary School. Mottola earned her Bachelor of Science degree at the University of Western Ontario and her Master of Science degree and PhD at the University of Alberta.

== Career ==
Mottola remained at the University of Alberta after earning her PhD in 1984 as an assistant professor of anatomy. She left in 1985 to join the Department of Anatomy and the Faculty of Kinesiology at the University of Western Ontario (UWO). In 1994, Mottola became the founding director of the Exercise and Pregnancy Lab at UWO. Shortly after opening her lab, Mottola and colleague Larry Wolfe developed the first guidelines on mild and moderate excersies for pregnant women. Her lab began the Nutrition and Exercise Lifestyle Intervention Program (NELIP), which was selected for the Canadian Best Practice Portal by the Public Health Agency of Canada. In 2019, she was co-lead author on the updated Canadian Guideline for Physical Activity throughout Pregnancy. She also sat as the founding chair on the American College of Sports Medicine's Special Interest Group in Pregnancy and Postpartum research.

In 2020, Mottola was appointed Chair of the Division of Maternal, Fetal, and Newborn Health at the Children's Health Research Institute. In this role, she helped develop the Get Active Questionnaire for Pregnancy and an associated Health Care Provider Consultation Form for Prenatal Physical Activity. As a result of her work, Mottola was elected a Fellow of the Canadian Society for Exercise Physiology in 2020. The following year, she was elected a Fellow of the Canadian Academy of Health Sciences for "shaping the importance of exercise and physical activity for pregnant and postpartum women." In 2024, Mottola was named a Distinguished University Professor.

== Personal life ==
Mottola married Gordon Marchiori in 1984.
