= List of foreign NBA coaches =

In the National Basketball Association (NBA), foreign coaches—also known as international coaches—are those who were born outside the United States.

This list includes all international coaches who have been assistant and/or head coach in the NBA and also includes all coaches who were born in the United States but have represented other countries in international basketball competition.

In 2000, Igor Kokoškov from Serbia became the first non-American to hold a full-time assistant coach position in the NBA. In 2004, he became the first non-American assistant coach to win an NBA championship, and the first to serve on an NBA All-Star Game coaching staff. In 2018, he became the first fully European head coach in the NBA.

== List ==
Note: These lists are correct through the start of the 2023–24 season.

Yrs	Number of seasons coached in the NBA
*	Denotes head or assistant coach who is still active in the NBA

=== List of head coaches ===
Nationality^{[A]}	Birthplace^{[B]}	Head coach	Career^{[C]}	Yrs	Notes	Ref.
Brazil	—	Tiago Splitter*	2025–present	0	Named interim head coach on October 23, 2025	
Canada	South Africa	Steve Nash	2020–2022	3	—	
Canada	—	Jay Triano	2008–2011; 2017–2018	4	—	
Finland	Finland	Tuomas Iisalo*	2025–present	0	—	
Israel	United States	David Blatt	2014–2016	2	Born in the United States to Jewish parents, has dual U.S. and Israeli citizenship.	
Italy	United States	Mike D'Antoni	1998–1999; 2003–2014; 2016–2020	16	Born in the United States to Italian parents, has dual U.S. and Italian citizenship.	
Nigeria	United States	Ime Udoka*	2021–2022; 2023–present	3	Born in the United States to Nigerian parents, has dual U.S. and Nigerian citizenship. Suspended for the 2022–23 season.	
Serbia	SFR Yugoslavia^{[D]} (now Serbia)	Igor Kokoškov	2018–2019	1	Also holds U.S. citizenship as of 2010.	
Serbia	SFR Yugoslavia^{[D]} (now Serbia)	Darko Rajaković*	2023–present	2	—	
Spain	—	Jordi Fernández*	2024–present	1	—	
United States	Lebanon	Steve Kerr*	2014–present	9	Born in Lebanon to Malcolm H. Kerr, a Lebanese-born American citizen.	
United States	Russian Empire^{[E]} (now Ukraine)	Eddie Gottlieb	1946–1955	9	Born in the Russian Empire, moved to the United States as a child, became a naturalized U.S. citizen.	
United States	West Germany	Kiki VanDeWeghe	2009–2010	1	Born in West Germany^{[F]} to a Canadian father and an American mother. Holds both American and Canadian passports.	

=== List of assistant coaches ===
Nationality^{[A]}	Birthplace^{[B]}	Assistant coach	Career^{[C]}	Yrs	Notes	Ref.
Argentina	—	Pablo Prigioni*	2018–present	5	Also holds Italian citizenship.	
Australia	—	Adam Caporn*	2022–present	1	—	
Australia	—	Damian Cotter*	2020–present	3	—	
Australia	—	Trevor Gleeson*	2021–present	2	—	
Australia	—	Matthew Nielsen*	2021–present	2	—	
Belize	United States	Marlon Garnett*	2015–present	8	Born in the United States to Belizean parents, has dual U.S. and Belize citizenship.	
Brazil	—	Leandro Barbosa*	2022–present	1	—	
Brazil	—	Tiago Splitter	2019–2023	4	—	
Canada	—	Gordon Herbert	2008–2009	1	Also holds Finnish citizenship.	
Canada	—	Jamaal Magloire	2013–2016	3	—	
Canada	—	Scott Morrison*	2017–2021; 2023–present	4	—	
Canada	Great Britain; England	Roy Rana	2019–2022	3	—	
Canada	—	Jay Triano*	2002–2008; 2012–2017; 2018–present	16	—	
Democratic Republic of the Congo	Zaire (now Democratic Republic of the Congo)	Patrick Mutombo	2012–2015; 2016–2020; 2022–present	9	Also holds Belgian citizenship.	
Croatia	SFR Yugoslavia^{[D]} (now Croatia)	Neven Spahija	2014–2017; 2019–2020	4	—	
Eswatini	—	Jama Mahlalela*	2012–2018; 2020–present	9	Also holds Canadian citizenship.	
Finland	Finland	Tuomas Iisalo*	2024–2025	1		
France	United States	James Wade*	2023–present	0	Born in the United States, became a naturalized French citizen.	
Germany	West Germany^{[F]} (now Germany)	Detlef Schrempf	2005–2007	2	—	
Georgia	United States	Tyrone Ellis	2017–2018	1	Born in the United States, became a naturalized Georgian citizen.	
Great Britain; Scotland	—	Alex McKechnie	2013–2020	7	—	
Great Britain; England	United States	Nate Reinking*	2021–present	1	—	
Greece	—	Fotios Katsikaris	2018–2019	1	—	<
Ireland	United States	Jay Larrañaga*	2012–present	11	Born in the United States to Irish parents, has dual U.S. and Irish citizenship.	
Ireland	United States	Jim Moran	2015–2023	8	Born in the United States to Irish parents, has dual U.S. and Irish citizenship.	
Israel	United States	Josh Oppenheimer*	2013–2017; 2020–present	8	Born in the United States, has dual U.S. and Israeli citizenship.	
Italy	United States	Mike D'Antoni	1997–1998; 2000–2001; 2002–2003; 2015–2016; 2020–2021	5	Born in the United States to Italian parents, has dual U.S. and Italian citizenship.	
Italy	United States	Tony Dobbins*	2018–present	5	Born in the United States, became a naturalized Italian citizen.	
Italy	—	Riccardo Fois*	2019–present	4	—	
Italy	—	Ettore Messina	2014–2019	5	—	
Italy	—	Sergio Scariolo	2018–2021	3	—	
Jordan	United States	Maz Trakh	2010–2014; 2016–2019	7	Born in the United States, has dual U.S. and Jordanian citizenship.	
Lithuania	Soviet Union^{[G]} (now Lithuania)	Darius Songaila*	2019–present	4	—	
Nigeria	United States	Ekpe Udoh*	2023–present	0	Born in the United States to Nigerian parents, has dual U.S. and Nigerian citizenship.	
Nigeria	United States	Ime Udoka	2012–2021	9	Born in the United States to Nigerian parents, has dual U.S. and Nigerian citizenship.	
North Macedonia	United States	Shayne Whittington*	2023–present	0	Born in the United States, became a naturalized Macedonian citizen.	
Palestine	—	Mahmoud Abdelfattah	2022–2023	1	Also holds U.S. citizenship.	
Philippines	United States	Chip Engelland*	1999–2000; 2003–present	21	Born in the United States, became a naturalized Filipino citizen.	
Poland	—	Marcin Gortat*	2022–present	1	—	
Russia	United States	Becky Hammon	2014–2022	8	Born in the United States, became a naturalized Russian citizen.	
Senegal	—	DeSagana Diop	2016–2022	6	—	
Serbia	SFR Yugoslavia^{[D]} (now Serbia)	Aleksandar Džikić	2005–2007	2	—	
Serbia	SFR Yugoslavia^{[D]} (now Serbia)	Igor Kokoškov*	2000–2018; 2019–2020; 2021–present	21	Also holds U.S. citizenship as of 2010.	
Serbia	SFR Yugoslavia^{[D]} (now Serbia)	Dejan Milojević	2021–2024	3	Died during the 2023–24 season.	
Serbia	SFR Yugoslavia^{[D]} (now Serbia)	Darko Rajaković	2014–2023	9	—	
Serbia	SFR Yugoslavia^{[D]} (now Serbia)	Ivo Simović*	2023–present	0	—	
Serbia	SFR Yugoslavia^{[D]} (now Serbia)	Ognjen Stojaković*	2016–present	7	—	
Serbia	SFR Yugoslavia^{[D]} (now Serbia)	Nenad Trajković	2010–2011	1	—	
Slovakia	United States	Kristi Toliver*	2018–present	5	Born in the United States, became a naturalized Slovak citizen.	
Slovenia	SFR Yugoslavia^{[D]} (now Slovenia)	Marko Milič*	2022–present	1	—	
Spain	—	Jordi Fernández	2016–2024	7	—	
Spain	—	Sergi Oliva	2020–2022	2	—	
Turkey	—	Erdem Can	2021–2022	1	—	
Turkey	—	Mehmet Okur	2016–2017	1	—	
Ukraine	Soviet Union^{[G]} (now Ukraine)	Vitaly Potapenko*	2010–2011; 2013–2017; 2018–present	10	—	
United States	Cuba	Octavio De La Grana*	2010–2012; 2016–present	9	Born in Cuba, moved to the United States at the age of 6, became a naturalized U.S. citizen.	
United States	Jamaica	Patrick Ewing	2002–2017	15	Born in Jamaica, moved to the United States at the age of 11, became a naturalized U.S. citizen.	
United States	Romania	Ernie Grunfeld	1989–1991	2	Born in Romania, moved to the United States at the age of 8, became a naturalized U.S. citizen.	
United States	U.S. Virgin Islands	Tim Duncan	2019–2020	1	—	
U.S. Virgin Islands	United States	David Vanterpool	2012–2022	10	Born on the United States mainland, represented U.S. Virgin Islands internationally.	

== See also ==
- List of Serbian NBA coaches
- List of foreign NBA players
- Race and ethnicity in the NBA
- List of current NBA head coaches
- List of NBA head coaches with 400 games coached

== Notes ==
- ^{A} Nationality indicates a coach's representative nationality.
- ^{B} Birthplace indicates a coach's country of birth. A blank column indicates that the coach's birth country is the same to his nationality.
- ^{C} Career in the NBA
- ^{D} SFR Yugoslavia dissolved in 1992 into five independent countries, Bosnia and Herzegovina, Croatia, Macedonia, Slovenia, and the Federal Republic of Yugoslavia. FR Yugoslavia was renamed into Serbia and Montenegro in February 2003 and dissolved in June 2006 into two independent countries, Montenegro and Serbia.
- ^{E} The Russian Empire was overthrown during the Russian Revolution in 1917; the resulting areas would eventually lead to being involved with 22 different modern-day countries.
- ^{F} Germany was previously divided into two independent countries, the Federal Republic of Germany (West Germany) and German Democratic Republic (East Germany), from 1949 to 1990.
- ^{G} The Soviet Union dissolved in December 1991 into 15 independent countries: Armenia, Azerbaijan, Belarus, Estonia, Georgia, Kazakhstan, Kyrgyzstan, Latvia, Lithuania, Moldova, Russia, Tajikistan, Turkmenistan, Ukraine and Uzbekistan.
