= Neven Spahija =

Croatian professional basketball coach (born 1962)

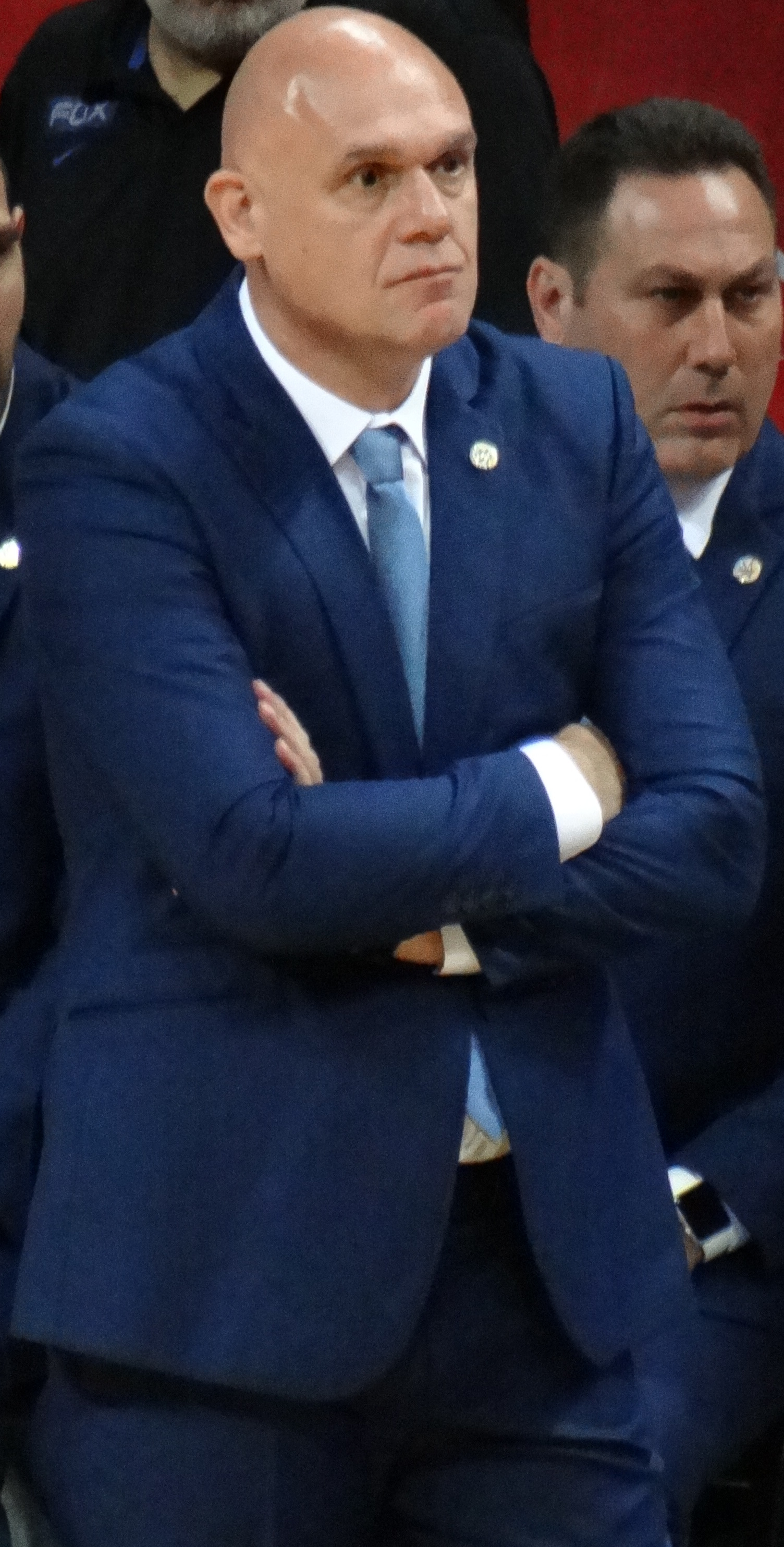
- Spahija while coaching Maccabi Tel Aviv in 2018

Umana Reyer Venezia
- Position: Head coach
- League: LBA; EuroCup

Personal information
- Born: 6 November 1962 (age 64) Šibenik, PR Croatia, Yugoslavia
- Coaching career: 1986–present

Career history

Coaching
- 1986–1987: Elemes Šibenik (assistant)
- 1994–1996: Zrinjevac (assistant)
- 1996–1997: Gradine Pula
- 1999–2000: Union Olimpija (assistant)
- 2000–2001: Cibona
- 2001–2003: Krka
- 2003: Avtodor Saratov
- 2004–2005: Roseto Sharks
- 2005–2006: Lietuvos rytas
- 2006–2007: Maccabi Tel Aviv
- 2007–2008: Tau Cerámica
- 2008–2010: Valencia
- 2010–2012: Fenerbahçe Ülker
- 2013: Cibona
- 2014–2017: Atlanta Hawks (assistant)
- 2017–2018: Maccabi Tel Aviv
- 2019–2020: Memphis Grizzlies (assistant)
- 2020–2021: Shanghai Sharks
- 2021–2022: Bitci Baskonia
- 2023–present: Reyer Venezia

Career highlights
- As head coach: EuroCup champion (2010); 2× Croatian League champion (2000, 2001); 2× Croatian Cup winner (2000, 2001); ULEB Cup finalist (2003); Slovenian League champion (2003); Lithuanian League champion (2006); Baltic League champion (2006); 2× Israeli League champion (2007, 2018); Spanish League champion (2008); Spanish Supercup winner (2007); Turkish League champion (2011); Turkish Cup winner (2011)

Neven Spahija (born 6 November 1962) is a Croatian professional basketball coach, who is currently the head coach for Reyer Venezia of the Italian Lega Basket Serie A (LBA) and the EuroCup. He spent four years in the NBA as an assistant coach with the Atlanta Hawks and Memphis Grizzlies.

== Coaching career ==
=== Club career ===
Spahija started his basketball coaching career with Gradine Pula from Croatia and Olimpija Ljubljana from Slovenia, working as an assistant coach. He started his head coaching career with Cibona from Croatia, where he won his first league championship in 2001. He then worked with Krka Novo Mesto from Slovenia, Avtodor Saratov from Russia, Lietuvos rytas from Lithuania, Maccabi Tel Aviv from Israel, and Baskonia and Valencia from Spain.

From 2010 to 2012, he was the head coach of Turkish team Fenerbahçe Ülker. In June 2013, he was named the head coach of Cibona, for the next four years. In November 2013, he parted ways with Cibona.

On 4 August 2014, Spahija was hired by the Atlanta Hawks, to be their assistant coach.

On 26 June 2017, Spahija returned to Maccabi Tel Aviv for a second stint, signing a 2+1-year contract. In the 2017–18 season, Spahija led Maccabi to win the 2017–18 Israeli League championship. On 18 November 2018, he parted ways with the club after four consecutive losses and a 1–6 start to the 2018–19 EuroLeague season.

In August 2019, Spahija was hired by the Memphis Grizzlies, to be their assistant coach, where he spent the 2019–20 season. On 13 September 2020, Spahija left the Grizzlies to coach overseas. On 20 September, he signed as head coach of the Shanghai Sharks of the Chinese Basketball Association (CBA).

=== National team career ===
Spahija led the senior Croatian national basketball team between 2001 and 2005, coaching them at the 2003 and 2005 European Championship tournaments.

== Coaching record ==
Legend
G	Games coached	W	Games won	L	Games lost	W–L %	Win-loss %

Note: The EuroLeague is not the only competition in which the team played during the season. He also coached in domestic competition, and regional competition if applicable.

=== EuroLeague ===
Team	Year	G	W	L	W–L%	Result
Cibona Zagreb	2000–01	12	3	9	.250	Eliminated in Top 16 stage
Cibona Zagreb	2001–02	6	2	4	.333	Fired
Krka	2001–02	5	4	1	.800	Eliminated in regular season
Lietuvos rytas	2005–06	20	11	9	.550	Eliminated in Top 16 stage
Maccabi Tel Aviv	2006–07	23	13	10	.565	Eliminated in quarterfinals
Tau Cerámica	2007–08	25	16	9	.640	Lost in 3rd place game
Fenerbahçe Ülker	2010–11	16	10	6	.625	Eliminated in Top 16 stage
Fenerbahçe Ülker	2011–12	16	8	8	.500	Eliminated in Top 16 stage
Maccabi Tel Aviv	2017–18	30	13	17	.433	Eliminated in Top 16 stage
Maccabi Tel Aviv	2018–19	7	1	6	.143	Fired
Career		160	81	79	.523	

== See also ==
- List of foreign NBA coaches
