= Rip City Remix =

American professional basketball team of the NBA G League

- Conference: Western
- League: NBA G League
- Founded: 2023
- History: Rip City Remix; 2023–present
- Arena: Chiles Center
- Location: North Portland, Oregon
- Team colors: Red, natural, black, maroon
- Head coach: Jonah Herscu
- Ownership: Portland Trail Blazers
- Affiliation: Portland Trail Blazers
- Website: Official website

The Rip City Remix are an American professional basketball team in the NBA G League based in North Portland, Oregon. They are affiliated with the Portland Trail Blazers, and play their home games at the Chiles Center.

== Franchise history ==
On April 26, 2023, the Portland Trail Blazers announced that they would be launching an NBA G League team for the 2023–24 season and on June 15, they hired Jim Moran to be their first head coach. On June 8 they held an expansion draft and selected 14 players. On June 26, the team's logo and name were unveiled as the Rip City Remix.

== Current roster ==
Rip City Remix roster
Players

| Pos. | No. | Player | Height | Weight | DOB | From |
|---|---|---|---|---|---|---|
| F | 29 | Jayson Kent (TW) | 6 ft 8 in (2.03 m) | 215 lb (98 kg) | 2002-02-03 | Texas |
| F | 55 | Jaylen Martin | 6 ft 6 in (1.98 m) | 216 lb (98 kg) | 2004-01-28 | Overtime Elite |
| G | 19 | Jamiya Neal | 6 ft 5 in (1.96 m) | 195 lb (88 kg) | 2003-04-04 | Creighton |
| G | – | John Tonje (TW) | 6 ft 4 in (1.93 m) | 218 lb (99 kg) | 2001-04-23 | Wisconsin |
| F | 10 | Romeo Weems | 6 ft 7 in (2.01 m) | 215 lb (98 kg) | 2001-06-09 | DePaul |
| G | 3 | Chris Youngblood (TW) | 6 ft 4 in (1.93 m) | 200 lb (91 kg) | 2002-02-09 | Alabama |

Coaches
Head coach
- Jonah Herscu
Assistant(s)
- Charles Klask
- Nshan Kenjoian

Legend
- (DP) Unsigned draft pick
- (FA) Free agent
- (S) Suspended
- (P) Prospects
- (NBA) On assignment from NBA affiliate
- (TW) Two-way affiliate player
- Injured

Roster
Updated: July 2, 2026

== Head coaches ==
| # | Head coach | Term | Regular season | | | | Playoffs | | | | Achievements |
| # | Head coach | Term | G | W | L | Win% | G | W | L | Win% | Achievements |
|---|---|---|---|---|---|---|---|---|---|---|---|
| 1 | Jim Moran | 2023–2024 | 34 | 18 | 16 | .529 | — | — | — | — | |
| 2 | Sergi Oliva | 2024–2025 | 34 | 14 | 20 | .412 | — | — | — | — | |
| 3 | Jonah Herscu | 2025–2026 | 22 | 13 | 9 | .591 | — | — | — | — | |
| 4 | Ameer Bahhur | 2026–present | | | | – | — | — | — | — | |

== List of seasons ==
| Season | Conference | Regular season | | | | Playoffs |
| Season | Conference | Finish | Wins | Losses | Pct. | Playoffs |
|---|---|---|---|---|---|---|
Rip City Remix
| 2023–24 | Western | 10th | 18 | 16 | .529 | |
| 2024–25 | Western | 12th | 14 | 20 | .412 | |
| Regular season record | | | 32 | 36 | .471 | |
| Playoff record | | | 0 | 0 | – | |

== NBA affiliates ==
- Portland Trail Blazers (2023–present)
