= A. N. Myer Secondary School =

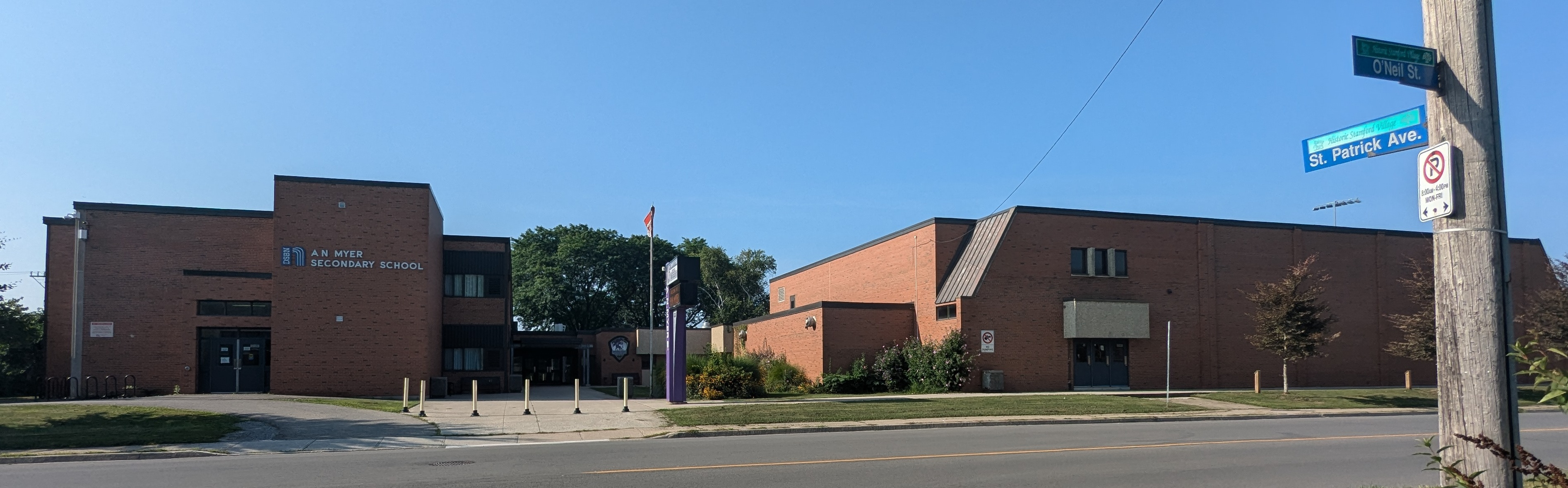
- The school in 2024

Location
- 6338 O'Neil Street; Niagara Falls, Ontario, L2J 1M7; Canada; 43°07′18″N 79°06′11″W

Information
- School type: Public, high school
- Motto: Nulli Secundus "second to none"
- Opened: September 1957
- School board: District School Board of Niagara
- Principal: Mrs. R. Lakeit
- Grades: 9–12
- Enrollment: 1213 (2019-2020)
- Language: English, French
- Campus: Suburban
- Colours: Purple and White
- Mascot: The A.N. Myer Marauder
- Team name: Myer Marauders
- Website: anmyer.dsbn.org

A. N. Myer Secondary School is a public high school located in Niagara Falls, Ontario, Canada. It is located on O'Neil Street and is part of the District School Board of Niagara. As of the 2019–2020 school year, 1213 students were enrolled. It is the only high school in the city of Niagara Falls to offer the French immersion program.

== History ==
A. N. Myer was named after Albert Nicholas Myer, who was the principal of Stamford Collegiate from 1908 to 1933. He lived in Chippawa, near Niagara, until his death in 1963. A. N. Myer Secondary School opened on September 3, 1957. An official opening ceremony was held nearly 2 months later on October 25, 1957. A reunion for the fiftieth anniversary of the school was held in 2007.

In 2021, a crotchet club was formed to create and donate blankets to local homeless shelters. In 2023, the school was used as a temporary location for the Niagara Falls Public Library while the Stamford Centre community branch was undergoing renovations. That same year, it hosted a Relay for Life event to fundraise for cancer research.

== Athletics ==
From 2014 to 2016, the senior boys football team won 3 straight OFSAA championships. Along with the OFSAA championship in 2016, the team also finished the season ranked 2nd in Canada, and finished those past 3 seasons with a combined record of 24–1. The seniors lost to Notre Dame College School in 2017, 2019, and 2021 and one match to St Paul Catholic High School in 2018. Those 3 teams would all end up making runs to OFSAA. The juniors have also made recent runs to the Niagara bowl in 2017, 2018, and 2021. They lost in 2018 and 2021 to Notre Dame College School, but in 2017 they defeated Blessed Trinity Catholic Secondary School. The junior team played in the Metrobowl playoffs, losing to Huron Heights Secondary School in the semi-finals. The Marauders 2023 season saw them win their first OFSAA banner since 2016, as the senior team went undefeated on their way to winning the OFSAA Central Bowl, defeating Ursuline College Chatham 38-21 in the championship. The juniors reached the Metrobowl quarterfinals where they had a 14-13 loss against Brantford Collegiate Institute.

In 2023, the city included eleven graduates from the school in its hall of fame.

== Controversies ==
A 31-year-old male teacher at A. N. Myer was charged in 2016 for inappropriate sexualized behaviour with two students under the age of 18. The teacher pled guilty and was sentenced to 90 days in jail, to be served on weekends. In addition to the jail term, he was placed on probation for three years and his name will appear on the National Sex Offender Registry for 10 years.

== Notable alumni ==
- John MacBain, Canadian businessman and philanthropist
- Jay Triano, basketball player, current assistant coach of the Dallas Mavericks
- Greg Newton, basketball player
- Tre Ford, CFL player with the Edmonton Elks
- Tyrell Ford, CFL player with the Edmonton Elks
- Mary Ellen Turpel-Lafond, Canadian lawyer
- Tim Hicks, country singer-songwriter
- Michelle F. Mottola, anatomist and exercise physiologist

== See also ==
- Education in Ontario
- List of secondary schools in Ontario
