= Jay Triano =

Canadian basketball coach (born 1958)

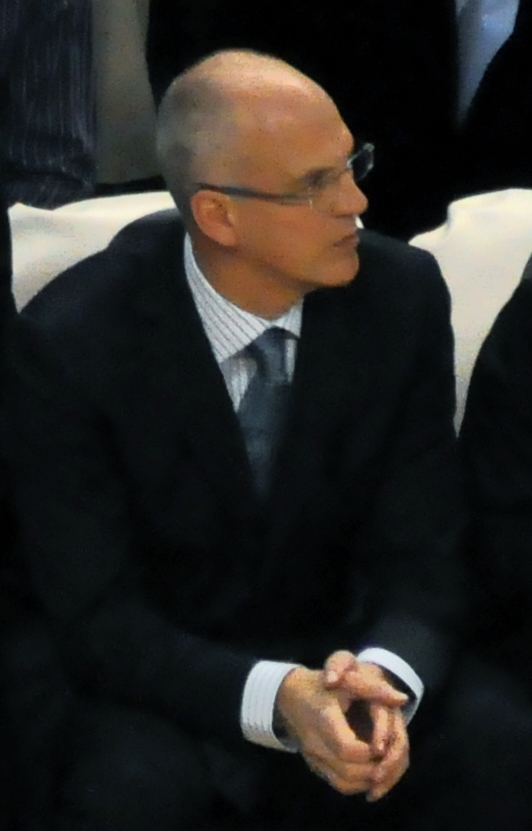
- Triano with the Raptors' coaching staff in 2009

Portland Trail Blazers
- Title: Assistant coach
- League: NBA

Personal information
- Born: September 21, 1958 (age 68) Tillsonburg, Ontario, Canada
- Listed height: 6 ft 4 in (1.93 m)
- Listed weight: 194 lb (88 kg)

Career information
- High school: A. N. Myer (Niagara Falls, Ontario)
- College: Simon Fraser (1977–1981)
- NBA draft: 1981: 8th round, 179th overall pick
- Drafted by: Los Angeles Lakers
- Playing career: 1981–1988
- Position: Guard
- Coaching career: 1988–present

Career history

Coaching
- 1988–1995: Simon Fraser
- 2002–2008: Toronto Raptors (assistant)
- 2008–2011: Toronto Raptors
- 2012–2016: Portland Trail Blazers (assistant)
- 2016–2017: Phoenix Suns (associate HC)
- 2017–2018: Phoenix Suns (interim HC)
- 2018–2022: Charlotte Hornets (assistant)
- 2022–2024: Sacramento Kings (assistant)
- 2024–2025: Sacramento Kings (associate HC)
- 2025–2026: Dallas Mavericks (assistant)
- 2026–present: Portland Trail Blazers (assistant)
- Stats at Basketball Reference

Howard James "Jay" Triano (born September 21, 1958) is a Canadian basketball coach and former professional player who is an assistant coach for the Portland Trail Blazers of the National Basketball Association (NBA). He previously served as the associate head coach of the Sacramento Kings, and as the head coach of the NBA's Toronto Raptors and Phoenix Suns. A former Canada national team player who competed in two Olympics, he has also had two stints as head coach of the national team.

== Early life and family ==
Triano was born in Tillsonburg, Ontario and raised in Niagara Falls, Ontario, where he attended A. N. Myer Secondary School. He is of Italian descent through his great-grandfather, who landed on Ellis Island, then made his way to Welland, Ontario. His younger brother Jeff was a draft pick of the Toronto Maple Leafs in the 1982 NHL entry draft, after playing OHL hockey for the Toronto Marlboros. Brady Heslip, his nephew and son of his sister Jody, played basketball at Baylor University and as of 2016 played for the Canada national team.

== Playing career ==
As a student at Simon Fraser University, the 6-foot-4-inch (1.93 m), 194-pound (88 kg) Triano broke or equalled eleven school men's basketball records, including having the most career points with 2,616. At Simon Fraser, he befriended Canadian athlete and activist Terry Fox. He was drafted in the eighth round of the 1981 NBA draft by the Los Angeles Lakers, but was cut during training camp and never played in the NBA. The same year, he was also drafted by the Calgary Stampeders in the sixth round of the 1981 CFL draft.

Triano was a national team player from 1977 to 1988, captained the team from 1981 to 1988, and played in the 1984 and 1988 Olympics. He led the Canadian team that won Gold at the 1983 World University Games in Edmonton, Alberta, defeating the United States in the semi-finals, which was led by Karl Malone and Charles Barkley, and Yugoslavia in the final, led by Dražen Petrović. He played three seasons of professional basketball, two in Mexico and one (1985–86 season for Fenerbahçe Istanbul) in Turkey.

== Coaching career ==
After retiring as a player in 1988, Triano became head coach at his alma mater, Simon Fraser. He attempted to recruit high school star Steve Nash and later served as his mentor. In 1995, when the nearby Vancouver Grizzlies debuted, he became team director of community relations and worked as the colour commentator for their radio broadcasts. In 1998, Triano became the head coach of the Canadian men's national basketball team. He coached the Nash-led team to a 5–2 record and a seventh-place finish in the 2000 Sydney Olympics, losing to France by five points in the quarter-finals. Two years later, he became an assistant coach for the Toronto Raptors, becoming the second Canadian-born coach in the NBA. He served under Lenny Wilkens, Kevin O'Neill, and Sam Mitchell.

In 2004, Triano was fired as national team head coach, and replaced by Leo Rautins the following year.

In 2008, Triano was named an assistant coach for United States national team. On February 13, 2008, Triano served as head coach of the Toronto Raptors in their 109–91 victory over the New Jersey Nets, in place of head coach Sam Mitchell, who was absent from the team as a result of the death of his father-in-law, making history as the first Canadian to serve as head coach for a regular-season NBA game.

On December 3, 2008, Triano was named interim head coach of the Raptors after Mitchell was relieved of his coaching duties. He became the first Canadian-born head coach in NBA history and first Canadian head coach in NBA history. Triano guided the Raptors to a 25–40 mark.

On May 12, 2009, Triano was given a three-year deal to remain head coach of the Raptors.

In Triano's first full season as the Raptors head coach in the 2009–10 season, Toronto missed making the playoffs by one game to the Chicago Bulls, going 2–5 in their final 7 games. The team finished 40–42.

In the 2010–11 season, without All-Star Chris Bosh on the roster, Triano led the Raptors to a dismal 22–60 record.

On June 1, 2011, the Raptors announced they would not be picking up the option on Triano's contract, but gave him another position within the organization, the vice-president of pro scouting.

On August 17, 2012, Triano was named as an assistant coach for the Portland Trail Blazers. The following week, Triano was also named head coach of Canada's national team for the second time in his career.

On July 27, 2016, Triano was hired by the Phoenix Suns as associate head coach.

On October 22, 2017, after a 0–3 start to the season, including one of the worst losses in Suns history and the worst loss to open up a regular season in league history, Triano was promoted to interim head coach of the Suns after the firing of Earl Watson. In his first game as head coach since 2011, Triano guided the team, which had suffered 40-plus-point losses earlier in the year, to leads as much as 22 points before winning 117–115 on October 23, against the Sacramento Kings for their first win of the season. On December 26, 2017, Triano became the first foreign-born head coach in NBA history to win 100 games in the league with a 99–97 win over the Memphis Grizzlies. However, the Suns finished the season with a 21–58 record under his tenure, and he did not return as head coach after that season. On July 2, 2018, Triano was hired by the Charlotte Hornets as an assistant coach.

On August 12, 2022, Triano was hired by the Sacramento Kings as an assistant coach. He was promoted to associate head coach after the 2023–24 season, following the departure of Jordi Fernández, who was hired as head coach of the Brooklyn Nets. On May 3, 2025, Triano was fired as the associate head coach of the Kings.

On June 14, 2025, Triano was added to the Dallas Mavericks' coaching staff under head coach Jason Kidd. He left in July 2026. The Portland Trail Blazers announced they had hired Triano as assistant coach on September 10, 2026, marking his second stint with the Blazers. Triano last served as an assistant coach for Portland from 2012-16.

== Head coaching record ==
Legend
Regular season	G	Games coached	W	Games won	L	Games lost	W–L %	Win–loss %
Playoffs	PG	Playoff games	PW	Playoff wins	PL	Playoff losses	PW–L %	Playoff win–loss %

Team	Year	G	W	L	W–L%	Finish	PG	PW	PL	PW–L%	Result
Toronto	2008–09	65	25	40	.385	4th in Atlantic	—	—	—	—	Missed playoffs
Toronto	2009–10	82	40	42	.488	2nd in Atlantic	—	—	—	—	Missed playoffs
Toronto	2010–11	82	22	60	.268	5th in Atlantic	—	—	—	—	Missed playoffs
Phoenix	2017–18	79	21	58	.266	5th in Pacific	—	—	—	—	Missed playoffs
Career		308	108	200	.351		—	—	—	—	

== See also ==
- List of foreign NBA coaches
