= List of Serbian NBA coaches =

List of Serbian coaches

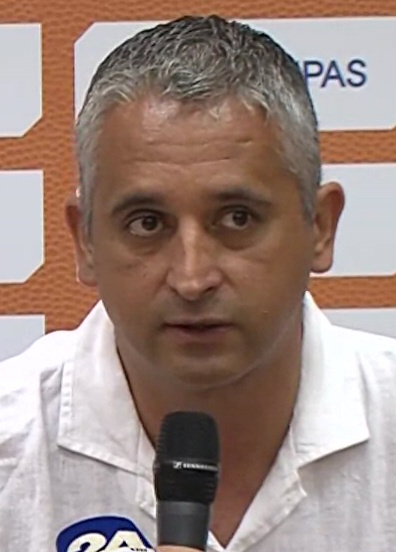
Igor Kokoškov was the first Serbian head coach in the NBA.

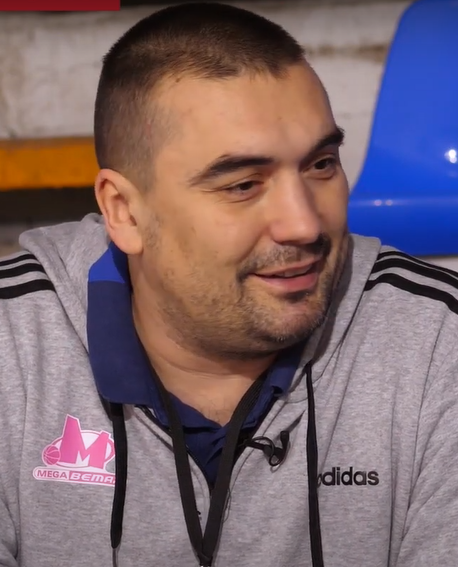
Dejan Milojević was assistant coach of the Golden State Warriors.

The following is a list of Serbian basketball coaches who have been assistant or head coaches in the National Basketball Association (NBA).

In 2000, Igor Kokoškov became the first non-American to hold a full-time assistant coach position in the NBA. In 2004, he became the first non-American assistant coach to win an NBA championship, and in 2006, he became the first to serve on an NBA All-Star Game coaching staff. In 2018, he became the first fully European head coach in the NBA.

In 2004, Igor Kokoškov won the NBA championship as an assistant coach of the Detroit Pistons. Since then, Dejan Milojević won the league in 2022 as an assistant coach of the Golden State Warriors.

== Key ==
*	Denotes coach who is still active in the NBA

Note: Both lists are correct through the start of the 2023–24 season.

== Serbian coaches ==
Coach	NBA Career	Se.	Honours (Note: This section doesn't include overseas honours, NBA finals entry and various types of records)	Ref.
Aleksandar Džikić	Minnesota Timberwolves assistant coach (2005–2007)	2	—	
Igor Kokoškov (Note: Also holds the United States citizenship) *	10 teams, 2 positions: Los Angeles Clippers assistant coach (2000–2003); Detroit Pistons assistant coach (2003–2008); Phoenix Suns assistant coach (2008–2013); Cleveland Cavaliers assistant coach (2013–2014); Orlando Magic assistant coach (2014–2015); Utah Jazz assistant coach (2015–2018); Phoenix Suns head coach (2018–2019) (Note: Phoenix Suns finished the season with a 19–63 record, tied for the second-worst record in the league.); Sacramento Kings assistant coach (2019–2020); Dallas Mavericks assistant coach (2021–2022); Brooklyn Nets assistant coach (2022–2023); Atlanta Hawks assistant coach (2023–present)	23	2 honours: NBA champion (2004); All-Star Game (2006)	
Dejan Milojević	Golden State Warriors assistant coach (2021–2024)	3	NBA champion (2022)	
Darko Rajaković *	4 teams, 2 positions: Oklahoma City Thunder assistant coach (2014–2019); Phoenix Suns assistant coach (2019–2020); Memphis Grizzlies assistant coach (2020–2023); Toronto Raptors head coach (2023–present)	10	All-Star Game (2014)	
Ivo Simović *	Toronto Raptors assistant coach (2023–present)	1	—	
Ognjen Stojaković *	1 team, 3 positions: Denver Nuggets video coordinator (2013–2016); Denver Nuggets assistant coach (2016–2018); Denver Nuggets player development (2018–2022) (Note: Prior to the 2019–20 NBA season, he was promoted to the director of player development.); Denver Nuggets assistant coach (2022–present)	11	2 honours: NBA champion (2023); All-Star Game (2023)	
Nenad Trajković	Phoenix Suns assistant coach (2010–2011)	1	—	

== Coaches with Serbian citizenship or parentage ==
The following is a list of coaches, who are or have been assistant or head coaches in NBA, who have citizenship of Serbia or Serbian parentage or who are Serbs of former Yugoslav republics (Bosnia and Herzegovina, Croatia, Montenegro, North Macedonia, Slovenia).

Nationality	Relation	Coach	NBA Career	Se.	Honours	Ref.
United States	Serbian father	Gregg Popovich *	2 teams, 2 positions: San Antonio Spurs assistant coach (1988–1992); Golden State Warriors assistant coach (1992–1994); San Antonio Spurs head coach (1996–2025)	35	30 honours: 5× NBA champion (1999, 2003, 2005, 2007, 2014); 3× NBA Coach of the Year (2003, 2012, 2014); 4× NBA All-Star Game head coach (2005, 2011, 2013, 2016); Top 15 Coaches in NBA History; 17× Coach of the Month	
Slovenia	Serbian father	Marko Milić *	Dallas Mavericks assistant coach (2022–2025)	2	—	

== See also ==
- List of foreign NBA coaches
- List of Serbian NBA players
- List of Serbian WNBA players

== Notes ==
Details

Other nationalities, ethnic groups, native-language
