= Canada national basketball team =

Canada national basketball team may refer to:

- Canada men's national basketball team
- Canada women's national basketball team
- Canada men's national under-19 basketball team
- Canada men's national under-17 basketball team
- Canada women's national under-19 basketball team
- Canada women's national under-17 basketball team
