= Darko Rajaković =

Serbian basketball coach (born 1979)

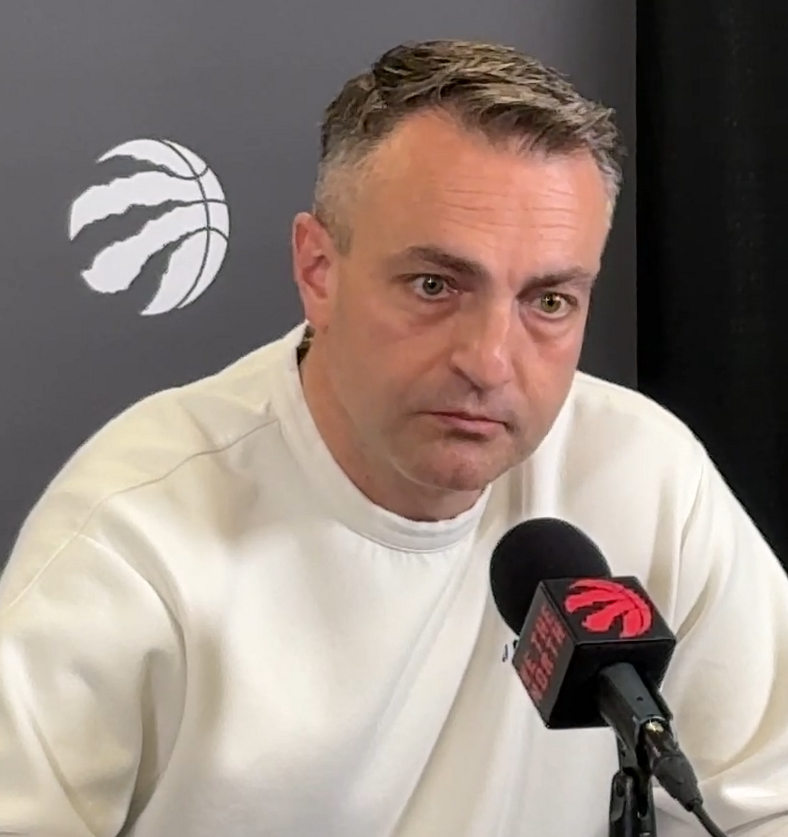
- Rajaković in 2026

Toronto Raptors
- Position: Head coach
- League: NBA

Personal information
- Born: 22 February 1979 (age 47) Čačak, SR Serbia, Yugoslavia

Career information
- Coaching career: 1996–present

Career history

Coaching
- 1996–1999: Borac Čačak (youth)
- 1999–2007: Crvena zvezda (youth)
- 2009–2012: Espacio Torrelodones
- 2012–2014: Tulsa 66ers
- 2014–2019: Oklahoma City Thunder (assistant)
- 2019–2020: Phoenix Suns (assistant)
- 2020–2023: Memphis Grizzlies (assistant)
- 2023–present: Toronto Raptors

Career highlights
- As head coach: NBA All-Star Game head coach (2026); As assistant coach: NBA All-Star Game (2014)

Darko Rajaković (Serbian Cyrillic: Дарко Рајаковић; born 22 February 1979) is a Serbian professional basketball coach who is the head coach for the Toronto Raptors of the National Basketball Association (NBA).

Rajaković was the head coach of the Tulsa 66ers of the NBA G League for two seasons and the first head coach in NBA G League history born outside of North America. Rajaković went on to become an assistant coach for the Oklahoma City Thunder, Phoenix Suns and Memphis Grizzlies prior to becoming the head coach of the Toronto Raptors.

== Education ==
Rajaković earned his degree in basketball coaching from the Belgrade Basketball Academy in 2004 and earned his degree in sports management from Alfa BK University in 2006.

== Coaching career ==
=== Early career ===
Rajaković began his coaching career at 16 years old with Borac Čačak in Čačak, Serbia. Following his three-year stint in Čačak, Rajaković was named the head coach for the Crvena zvezda youth system in Belgrade. During his eight years in Belgrade, Rajaković led Crvena zvezda to two Serbian Youth championships. To increase his basketball coaching acumen and knowledge, Rajaković spent time with Lute Olson at the University of Arizona (2003) and Mike Krzyzewski at Duke University (2007) and attended team practices and meetings at both universities.

From 2004 to 2011, Rajaković served as a scouting consultant and NBA Summer League assistant coach for the San Antonio Spurs.

=== Espacio Torrelodones (2009–2012) ===
In 2009, Rajaković become the head coach of Espacio Torrelodones of the Spanish EBA League (4th-tier). Rajaković excelled in both recruiting and developing players. In his first season, Rajaković led the Torrelodones to the Primera Division – Community of Madrid Group (5th-tier) title, promoting the team to the Liga EBA. In the 2010–11 Liga EBA season, the Torrelodones finished 7th in Group B with a 16–14 record. In the next season and his last as their coach, the Torrelodones finished 8th in Group B with the same record as in the season before.

=== Tulsa 66ers (2012–2014) ===
In 2012, Rajaković became the head coach of the Tulsa 66ers of the NBA Development League. Rajaković led Tulsa to a combined 51–49 record over two seasons, including a 27–23 record and NBA D-League Semifinals appearance in 2012–13. During his time with the 66ers, Tulsa was assigned seven players from Oklahoma City a total of 50 times (the most in the league during that stretch), including Oklahoma City players such as Reggie Jackson, Perry Jones, Jeremy Lamb and André Roberson. Rajaković witnessed five of his Tulsa players receive call-ups to the NBA, including four to the Oklahoma City Thunder (Grant Jerrett, Daniel Orton, Mustafa Shakur and Reggie Williams). He coached 11 Tulsa players over the two years who were on an NBA roster in the 2013–14 season.

=== NBA assistant (2014–2023) ===
On 5 July 2014, Rajaković was named assistant coach of the Oklahoma City Thunder. During his time with the Thunder, Rajaković helped develop many players, including Steven Adams, Andre Roberson, Terrance Ferguson, Victor Oladipo, Dennis Schröder and Alex Abrines. Rajaković served as the Thunder's head coach at NBA Summer League in 2014 and 2015. He was on the Western Conference All-Star Team coaching staff in 2014. Rajaković helped lead the Thunder to the playoffs four consecutive seasons (2016, 2017, 2018 and 2019), making it to the 2016 NBA Western Conference Finals.

On 26 June 2019, Rajaković was hired as an assistant coach for the Phoenix Suns.

On 13 September 2020, Rajaković was hired as an assistant coach for the Memphis Grizzlies. On 11 January 2022, Rajaković as the interim head coach led the Grizzlies to a 116–108 win over the Golden State Warriors. It was his head coaching debut in NBA. After his fellow Serbian countryman Igor Kokoškov, he is the second European who led an NBA team in a regular season game. Rajaković finished his stint as the interim head coach with a 4–1 record.

In May 2022, Rajaković was featured in ESPN's annual report on potential coaching candidates to watch. The article stated:

People all over the coaching world, as well as players who have benefited from his grasp of the game, rave about Darko Rajakovic. That makes a lot of sense when you consider he has been poached twice—Phoenix and Memphis—over the past couple of years by incoming head coaches assembling a staff from scratch. A European head coach has yet to break through with a sustained career in the NBA, but Rajakovic (Serbia) has the intellect and passion for the craft that makes him the current morning-line favorite to become the first. The man has authored academic-journal style articles about the evolution of the pick-and-roll, but he's anything but academic in his warmth with players and fellow coaches.

=== Toronto Raptors (2023–present) ===
On 13 June 2023, Rajaković was hired by the Toronto Raptors as the 10th head coach in franchise history. Rajaković was fined $25,000 after he used his post-game press conference to speak out against the NBA's officiating in a 132–131 loss to the Los Angeles Lakers on 10 January 2024, which he felt was biased towards the Lakers and giving the Raptors unfair disadvantages.

On 2 July 2026, Rajaković and the Raptors agreed to a multiyear contract extension.

== National team coaching career ==
On July 18, 2019, Rajaković was hired as an assistant coach for the Serbia men's national basketball team under Aleksandar Đorđević. He made his debut at the 2019 FIBA Basketball World Cup where Serbia came in fifth place.

== Personal life ==
On 9 May 2024, Rajaković and his wife Gaga donated US$46,700 to Sick Kids hospital in Toronto, St. Jude Research Hospital in Memphis and to the University Children Hospital in Belgrade. The donation was a result of a commitment of Rajaković and his family to donate US$20 for every assist the Raptors made. Rajaković and his wife both officially became naturalized US citizens on April 14, 2023.

== Head coaching record ==
=== NBA Development League ===
Legend
| Regular season | G | Games coached | W | Games won | L | Games lost | W–L % | Win–loss % |
| Playoffs | PG | Playoff games | PW | Playoff wins | PL | Playoff losses | PW–L % | Playoff win–loss % |

| Team | Year | G | W | L | W–L% | Finish | PG | PW | PL | PW–L% | Result |
|---|---|---|---|---|---|---|---|---|---|---|---|
| Tulsa | 2012–13 | 50 | 27 | 23 | .540 | 3rd in Central | 5 | 2 | 3 | .400 | Lost Semifinals |
| Tulsa | 2013–14 | 50 | 24 | 26 | .480 | 5th in Central | | | | – | Missed playoffs |
| Career | | 100 | 51 | 49 | .510 | | 5 | 2 | 3 | .400 | |

=== NBA ===
Legend
| Regular season | G | Games coached | W | Games won | L | Games lost | W–L % | Win–loss % |
| Playoffs | PG | Playoff games | PW | Playoff wins | PL | Playoff losses | PW–L % | Playoff win–loss % |

| Team | Year | G | W | L | W–L% | Finish | PG | PW | PL | PW–L% | Result |
|---|---|---|---|---|---|---|---|---|---|---|---|
| Toronto | 2023–24 | 82 | 25 | 57 | .305 | 5th in Atlantic | — | — | — | — | Missed playoffs |
| Toronto | 2024–25 | 82 | 30 | 52 | .366 | 3rd in Atlantic | — | — | — | — | Missed playoffs |
| Toronto | 2025–26 | 82 | 46 | 36 | .561 | 3rd in Atlantic | 7 | 3 | 4 | .429 | Lost in first round |
| Career | | 246 | 101 | 145 | .411 | | 7 | 3 | 4 | .429 | |

== See also ==
- List of Serbian NBA coaches
- List of foreign NBA coaches
- List of Toronto Raptors head coaches
